= 2013 BWF season =

Badminton season

2013 BWF Season
Details
- Duration: January 8, 2013 – December 28, 2013

Achievements (singles)

Awards
- Player of the year: (Malaysia) Lee Chong Wei (Male) (China) Li Xuerui (Female)

The 2013 BWF Season was the overall badminton circuit organized by the Badminton World Federation (BWF) for the 2013 badminton season to publish and promote the sport. Besides the BWF World Championships, BWF promotes the sport of badminton through an extensive worldwide programme of events in four structure levels. They were the individual tournaments called Super Series, Grand Prix Events, International Challenge and International Series. Besides the individual tournaments, team events such as Thomas Cup & Uber Cup and Sudirman Cup are held every other year.

The 2013 BWF season calendar comprised the World Championships tournaments, the Sudirman Cup, the BWF Super Series (Super Series, Super Series Premier, Super Series Finals), the Grand Prix (Grand Prix Gold and Grand Prix), the International Series (International Series and International Challenge), and Future Series.

== Schedule ==
This is the complete schedule of events on the 2013 calendar, with the Champions and Runners-up documented.

Key

World Championships
Super Series Finals
Super Series Premier
Super Series
Grand Prix Gold
Grand Prix
International Challenge
International Series
Future Series
Team events

=== January ===
| Week of | Tournament | Champions | Runners-up |
|---|---|---|---|
| January 7 | Korea Open; Seoul, South Korea; Super Series Premier $1,000,000 – 32MS/32WS/32MD/32WD/32XD; Draw | (Malaysia) Lee Chong Wei; 21-12, 21-15 | (China) Du Pengyu |
| January 7 | Korea Open; Seoul, South Korea; Super Series Premier $1,000,000 – 32MS/32WS/32MD/32WD/32XD; Draw | (South Korea) Sung Ji-hyun; 21–12, 22-20 | (China) Wang Shixian |
| January 7 | Korea Open; Seoul, South Korea; Super Series Premier $1,000,000 – 32MS/32WS/32MD/32WD/32XD; Draw | (South Korea) Ko Sung-hyun (South Korea) Lee Yong-dae; 19-21, 21–13, 21-10 | (Denmark) Mathias Boe (Denmark) Carsten Mogensen |
| January 7 | Korea Open; Seoul, South Korea; Super Series Premier $1,000,000 – 32MS/32WS/32MD/32WD/32XD; Draw | (China) Wang Xiaoli (China) Yu Yang; 21–17, 21–13 | (China) Ma Jin (China) Tang Jinhua |
| January 7 | Korea Open; Seoul, South Korea; Super Series Premier $1,000,000 – 32MS/32WS/32MD/32WD/32XD; Draw | (China) Zhang Nan (China) Zhao Yunlei; 13-21, 21–16, 21-13 | (China) Xu Chen (China) Ma Jin |
| January 7 | Estonian International; Tallinn, Estonia; International Series $5,000 – 32MS/32WS/32MD/16WD/16XD | (Japan) Kento Momota; 20-22, 21–15, 21-15 | (Finland) Eetu Heino |
| January 7 | Estonian International; Tallinn, Estonia; International Series $5,000 – 32MS/32WS/32MD/16WD/16XD | (Denmark) Line Kjærsfeldt; 13-21, 21–18, 21-18 | (Russia) Natalia Perminova |
| January 7 | Estonian International; Tallinn, Estonia; International Series $5,000 – 32MS/32WS/32MD/16WD/16XD | (France) Laurent Constantin (France) Matthieu Lo Ying Ping; 21-11, 22-20 | (Finland) Iikka Heino (Finland) Mika Köngäs |
| January 7 | Estonian International; Tallinn, Estonia; International Series $5,000 – 32MS/32WS/32MD/16WD/16XD | (Russia) Irina Khlebko (Russia) Ksenia Polikarpova; 15-21 21-19 22-20 | (Denmark) Julie Finne-Ipsen (Denmark) Rikke Søby Hansen |
| January 7 | Estonian International; Tallinn, Estonia; International Series $5,000 – 32MS/32WS/32MD/16WD/16XD | (Finland) Anton Kaisti (Finland) Jenny Nyström; 21-18, 21-10 | (France) Bastian Kersaudy (France) Anne Tran |
| January 14 | Malaysia Open; Kuala Lumpur, Malaysia; Super Series $400,000 – 32MS/32WS/32MD/32WD/32XD; Draw | (Malaysia) Lee Chong Wei; 21–7, 21-8 | (Indonesia) Sony Dwi Kuncoro |
| January 14 | Malaysia Open; Kuala Lumpur, Malaysia; Super Series $400,000 – 32MS/32WS/32MD/32WD/32XD; Draw | (Chinese Taipei) Tai Tzu-ying; 21–17, 21-14 | (China) Yao Xue |
| January 14 | Malaysia Open; Kuala Lumpur, Malaysia; Super Series $400,000 – 32MS/32WS/32MD/32WD/32XD; Draw | (Indonesia) Mohammad Ahsan (Indonesia) Hendra Setiawan; 21-15, 21-13 | (South Korea) Ko Sung-hyun (South Korea) Lee Yong-dae |
| January 14 | Malaysia Open; Kuala Lumpur, Malaysia; Super Series $400,000 – 32MS/32WS/32MD/32WD/32XD; Draw | (China) Bao Yixin (China) Tian Qing; 21-16, 21-14 | (Japan) Misaki Matsutomo (Japan) Ayaka Takahashi |
| January 14 | Malaysia Open; Kuala Lumpur, Malaysia; Super Series $400,000 – 32MS/32WS/32MD/32WD/32XD; Draw | (Denmark) Joachim Fischer Nielsen (Denmark) Christinna Pedersen; 21-13, 21-18 | (Malaysia) Chan Peng Soon (Malaysia) Goh Liu Ying |
| January 14 | Swedish Masters; Stockholm, Sweden; International Challenge $15,000 – 32MS/32WS/32MD/32WD/32XD | (Japan) Kento Momota; 21-9, 16–21, 21-18 | (Netherlands) Eric Pang |
| January 14 | Swedish Masters; Stockholm, Sweden; International Challenge $15,000 – 32MS/32WS/32MD/32WD/32XD | (Spain) Carolina Marín; 21-6, 21-10 | (Switzerland) Nicole Schaller |
| January 14 | Swedish Masters; Stockholm, Sweden; International Challenge $15,000 – 32MS/32WS/32MD/32WD/32XD | (Netherlands) Jacco Arends (Netherlands) Jelle Maas; 16-21, 21–16, 21-13 | (Netherlands) Ruud Bosch (Netherlands) Koen Ridder |
| January 14 | Swedish Masters; Stockholm, Sweden; International Challenge $15,000 – 32MS/32WS/32MD/32WD/32XD | (Netherlands) Selena Piek (Netherlands) Iris Tabeling; 21–15, 21–16 | (Sweden) Emelie Lennartsson (Sweden) Emma Wengberg |
| January 14 | Swedish Masters; Stockholm, Sweden; International Challenge $15,000 – 32MS/32WS/32MD/32WD/32XD | (Germany) Peter Käsbauer (Germany) Isabel Herttrich; 21-17, 21-14 | (Netherlands) Jelle Maas (Netherlands) Iris Tabeling |
| January 21 | Cyprus International; Nicosia, Cyprus; International Series $5,000 – 32MS/16WS/16MD/8WD/8XD | (Republic of Ireland) Scott Evans; 21-17, 21-11 | (England) Andrew Smith |
| January 21 | Cyprus International; Nicosia, Cyprus; International Series $5,000 – 32MS/16WS/16MD/8WD/8XD | (Bulgaria) Linda Zetchiri; 21–15, 21-19 | (Wales) Carissa Turner |
| January 21 | Cyprus International; Nicosia, Cyprus; International Series $5,000 – 32MS/16WS/16MD/8WD/8XD | (Wales) Joe Morgan (Wales) Nic Strange; 24-22, 19–21, 21-14 | (England) Sam Parsons (England) Rhys Walker |
| January 21 | Cyprus International; Nicosia, Cyprus; International Series $5,000 – 32MS/16WS/16MD/8WD/8XD | (Wales) Sarah Thomas (Wales) Carissa Turner; 21-14, 21–13 | (Cyprus) Maria Avraamidou (Cyprus) Stella Knekna |
| January 21 | Cyprus International; Nicosia, Cyprus; International Series $5,000 – 32MS/16WS/16MD/8WD/8XD | (Wales) Oliver Gwilt (Wales) Sarah Thomas; 21-10, 21-17 | (Belgium) Nathan Vervaeke (Belgium) Sabine Devooght |

=== February ===
| Week of | Tournament | Champions | Runners-up |
|---|---|---|---|
| February 11 | European Mixed Team Badminton Championships; Moscow, Russia; Continental Championships; 29 Team | Germany; 3-0 | Denmark |
| February 11 | Iran Fajr International; Tehran, Iran; International Challenge $15,000 – 32MS/32WS/32MD/16WD | (Indonesia) Riyanto Subagja; 21–17, 15–21, 21–15 | (Indonesia) Arif Gifar Ramadhan |
| February 11 | Iran Fajr International; Tehran, Iran; International Challenge $15,000 – 32MS/32WS/32MD/16WD | (Turkey) Neslihan Yiğit; 21-15, 21-14 | (Indonesia) Febby Angguni |
| February 11 | Iran Fajr International; Tehran, Iran; International Challenge $15,000 – 32MS/32WS/32MD/16WD | (Indonesia) Wahyu Nayaka (Indonesia) Ade Yusuf; 21–19, 13–21, 22–20 | (Indonesia) Ronald Alexander (Indonesia) Selvanus Geh |
| February 11 | Iran Fajr International; Tehran, Iran; International Challenge $15,000 – 32MS/32WS/32MD/16WD | (Malaysia) Amelia Alicia Anscelly (Malaysia) Soong Fie Cho; 21-18, 21-15 | (Canada) Nicole Grether (Canada) Charmaine Reid |
| February 18 | Austrian International; Vienna, Austria; International Challenge $15,000 – 32MS/32WS/32MD/32WD/32XD | (Japan) Kento Momota; 21-19, 21-12 | (Japan) Riichi Takeshita |
| February 18 | Austrian International; Vienna, Austria; International Challenge $15,000 – 32MS/32WS/32MD/32WD/32XD | (Japan) Yui Hashimoto; 21-11, 21-3 | (Bulgaria) Petya Nedelcheva |
| February 18 | Austrian International; Vienna, Austria; International Challenge $15,000 – 32MS/32WS/32MD/32WD/32XD | (Japan) Hiroyuki Saeki (Japan) Ryota Taohata; 21-18 15-21 21-18 | (Japan) Takeshi Kamura (Japan) Keigo Sonoda |
| February 18 | Austrian International; Vienna, Austria; International Challenge $15,000 – 32MS/32WS/32MD/32WD/32XD | (Japan) Misato Aratama (Japan) Megumi Taruno; 21-14, 22-20 | (Malaysia) Chow Mei Kuan (Malaysia) Lee Meng Yean |
| February 18 | Austrian International; Vienna, Austria; International Challenge $15,000 – 32MS/32WS/32MD/32WD/32XD | (Hong Kong) Chan Yun Lung (Hong Kong) Tse Ying Suet; 15-21 21-16 21-16 | (Hong Kong) Lee Chun Hei (Hong Kong) Chau Hoi Wah |
| February 18 | Uganda International; Lugogo, Uganda; International Series $5,000 – 32MS/32WS/16MD/16WD/32XD | (Sri Lanka) Dinuka Karunaratne; 21-16, 21-17 | (India) Subhankar Dey |
| February 18 | Uganda International; Lugogo, Uganda; International Series $5,000 – 32MS/32WS/16MD/16WD/32XD | (India) Saili Rane; 21-21, 21-12 | (Egypt) Hadia Hosny |
| February 18 | Uganda International; Lugogo, Uganda; International Series $5,000 – 32MS/32WS/16MD/16WD/32XD | (Italy) Giovanni Greco (Italy) Daniel Messersi; 21-18, 21-18 | (Egypt) Mahmoud El Sayad (Egypt) Abdelrahman Kashkal |
| February 18 | Uganda International; Lugogo, Uganda; International Series $5,000 – 32MS/32WS/16MD/16WD/32XD | (Mauritius) Shama Aboobakar (Nigeria) Grace Gabriel; 21-13, 18–21, 21-12 | (Uganda) Shamim Bangi (Uganda) Margaret Nankabirwa |
| February 18 | Uganda International; Lugogo, Uganda; International Series $5,000 – 32MS/32WS/16MD/16WD/32XD | (Egypt) Mahmoud El Sayad (Egypt) Nadine Ashraf; 14-21, 21–15, 21-19 | (Egypt) Abdelrahman Kashkal (Egypt) Hadia Hosny |
| February 25 | German Open; Mülheim, Germany; Grand Prix Gold $120,000 – 64MS/32WS/32MD/32WD/32XD; Draw | (China) Chen Long; 21–17, 21–11 | (Indonesia) Tommy Sugiarto |
| February 25 | German Open; Mülheim, Germany; Grand Prix Gold $120,000 – 64MS/32WS/32MD/32WD/32XD; Draw | (China) Wang Yihan; 21–14, 21–13 | (Germany) Juliane Schenk |
| February 25 | German Open; Mülheim, Germany; Grand Prix Gold $120,000 – 64MS/32WS/32MD/32WD/32XD; Draw | (China) Chai Biao (China) Hong Wei; 21–10, 21–14 | (China) Liu Xiaolong (China) Qiu Zihan |
| February 25 | German Open; Mülheim, Germany; Grand Prix Gold $120,000 – 64MS/32WS/32MD/32WD/32XD; Draw | (South Korea) Jung Kyung-eun (South Korea) Kim Ha-na; 11–21, 21–14, 21–13 | (China) Ma Jin (China) Tang Jinhua |
| February 25 | German Open; Mülheim, Germany; Grand Prix Gold $120,000 – 64MS/32WS/32MD/32WD/32XD; Draw | (South Korea) Shin Baek-choel (South Korea) Jang Ye-na; 21–19, 19–21, 24–22 | (Denmark) Anders Kristiansen (Denmark) Julie Houmann |

=== March ===
| Week of | Tournament | Champions | Runners-up |
|---|---|---|---|
| March 4 | All England Open; Birmingham, England; Super Series Premier $400,000 – 32MS/32WS/32MD/32WD/32XD; Draw | (China) Chen Long; 21–17, 21–18 | (Malaysia) Lee Chong Wei |
| March 4 | All England Open; Birmingham, England; Super Series Premier $400,000 – 32MS/32WS/32MD/32WD/32XD; Draw | (Denmark) Tine Baun; 21-14, 16–21, 21–10 | (Thailand) Ratchanok Intanon |
| March 4 | All England Open; Birmingham, England; Super Series Premier $400,000 – 32MS/32WS/32MD/32WD/32XD; Draw | (China) Liu Xiaolong (China) Qiu Zihan; 21–11, 21–9 | (Japan) Hiroyuki Endo (Japan) Kenichi Hayakawa |
| March 4 | All England Open; Birmingham, England; Super Series Premier $400,000 – 32MS/32WS/32MD/32WD/32XD; Draw | (China) Wang Xiaoli (China) Yu Yang; 21–18, 21–10 | (China) Cheng Shu (China) Zhao Yunlei |
| March 4 | All England Open; Birmingham, England; Super Series Premier $400,000 – 32MS/32WS/32MD/32WD/32XD; Draw | (Indonesia) Tontowi Ahmad (Indonesia) Liliyana Natsir; 21–13, 21–17 | (China) Zhang Nan (China) Zhao Yunlei |
| March 11 | Swiss Open; Basel, Switzerland; Grand Prix Gold $125,000 – 64MS/32WS/32MD/32WD/32XD; Draw | (China) Wang Zhengming; 21-18, 21-18 | (China) Du Pengyu |
| March 11 | Swiss Open; Basel, Switzerland; Grand Prix Gold $125,000 – 64MS/32WS/32MD/32WD/32XD; Draw | (China) Wang Shixian; 21–16, 21–12 | (Thailand) Ratchanok Intanon |
| March 11 | Swiss Open; Basel, Switzerland; Grand Prix Gold $125,000 – 64MS/32WS/32MD/32WD/32XD; Draw | (China) Chai Biao (China) Hong Wei; 21–14, 18–21, 21–14 | (South Korea) Ko Sung-hyun (South Korea) Lee Yong-dae |
| March 11 | Swiss Open; Basel, Switzerland; Grand Prix Gold $125,000 – 64MS/32WS/32MD/32WD/32XD; Draw | (South Korea) Jung Kyung-eun (South Korea) Kim Ha-na; 23–21, 21–16 | (South Korea) Lee So-hee (South Korea) Shin Seung-chan |
| March 11 | Swiss Open; Basel, Switzerland; Grand Prix Gold $125,000 – 64MS/32WS/32MD/32WD/32XD; Draw | (Denmark) Joachim Fischer Nielsen (Denmark) Christinna Pedersen; 22–20, 21–19 | (China) Zhang Nan (China) Tang Jinhua |
| March 11 | Romanian International; Timișoara, Romania; International Series $5,000 – 32MS/32WS/32MD/16WD/32XD | (Japan) Takuto Inoue; 10-21, 21–17, 21-15 | (France) Lucas Corvee |
| March 11 | Romanian International; Timișoara, Romania; International Series $5,000 – 32MS/32WS/32MD/16WD/32XD | (Spain) Beatriz Corrales; 15-21, 21–6, 21-15 | (South Korea) Kim Na-young |
| March 11 | Romanian International; Timișoara, Romania; International Series $5,000 – 32MS/32WS/32MD/16WD/32XD | (Japan) Takuto Inoue (Japan) Yuki Kaneko; 21-10, 21-10 | (France) Quentin Vincent (France) Sebastien Vincent |
| March 11 | Romanian International; Timișoara, Romania; International Series $5,000 – 32MS/32WS/32MD/16WD/32XD | (Russia) Irina Khlebko (Russia) Ksenia Polikarpova; 21-18, 23-21 | (Ukraine) Natalya Voytsekh (Ukraine) Yelyzaveta Zharka |
| March 11 | Romanian International; Timișoara, Romania; International Series $5,000 – 32MS/32WS/32MD/16WD/32XD | (South Korea) Choi Sol-kyu (South Korea) Kim Hye-rin; 21-16, 21-13 | (Turkey) Ramazan Ozturk (Turkey) Neslihan Kilic |
| March 18 | Giraldilla International; Havana, Cuba; Future Series; 32MS/32WS/16MD/16WD/32XD | (Cuba) Osleni Guerrero; 21–19, 21–3 | (Czech Republic) Jan Frohlich |
| March 18 | Giraldilla International; Havana, Cuba; Future Series; 32MS/32WS/16MD/16WD/32XD | (Peru) Camilla Garcia; 21–15, 18–21, 21-12 | (Peru) Daniela Macias |
| March 18 | Giraldilla International; Havana, Cuba; Future Series; 32MS/32WS/16MD/16WD/32XD | (Czech Republic) Jan Frohlich (Czech Republic) Svata Zdenek; 21–8, 21–14 | (Dominican Republic) Nelson Javier (Dominican Republic) Freddy Lopez |
| March 18 | Giraldilla International; Havana, Cuba; Future Series; 32MS/32WS/16MD/16WD/32XD | (Peru) Camilla Garcia (Peru) Danica Nishimura; 17-21, 21–18, 22-20 | (Peru) Daniela Macias (Peru) Luz Maria Zornoza |
| March 18 | Giraldilla International; Havana, Cuba; Future Series; 32MS/32WS/16MD/16WD/32XD | (Mexico) Lino Munoz (Mexico) Cynthia Gonzalez; 21-19, 25–27, 21-12 | (Dominican Republic) Nelson Javier (Dominican Republic) Beronica Vibieca |
| March 18 | Polish Open; Warsaw, Poland; International Challenge $15,000 – 32MS/32WS/32MD/16WD/32XD | (Russia) Vladimir Malkov; 21–12, 20–22, 21-18 | (Chinese Taipei) Hsu Jen-hao |
| March 18 | Polish Open; Warsaw, Poland; International Challenge $15,000 – 32MS/32WS/32MD/16WD/32XD | (Japan) Shizuka Uchida; Walkover | (Chinese Taipei) Pai Hsiao-ma |
| March 18 | Polish Open; Warsaw, Poland; International Challenge $15,000 – 32MS/32WS/32MD/16WD/32XD | (Poland) Adam Cwalina (Poland) Przemyslaw Wacha; 21-19, 22–24, 21-17 | (Japan) Yuya Komatsuzaki (Japan) Hiroki Takeuchi |
| March 18 | Polish Open; Warsaw, Poland; International Challenge $15,000 – 32MS/32WS/32MD/16WD/32XD | (Japan) Rie Eto (Japan) Yu Wakita; 21–11, 21-7 | (Japan) Yuki Anai (Japan) Yumi Murayama |
| March 18 | Polish Open; Warsaw, Poland; International Challenge $15,000 – 32MS/32WS/32MD/16WD/32XD | (Poland) Robert Mateusiak (Poland) Nadiezda Zieba; 15-21, 21–16, 21-14 | (Poland) Wojciech Szkudlarczyk (Poland) Agnieszka Wojtkowska |
| March 25 | Vietnam International; Hanoi, Vietnam; International Challenge $15,000 – 64MS/32WS/32MD/32WD/32XD | (Malaysia) Chan Kwong Beng; 21–11, 22–20 | (Hong Kong) Ng Ka Long |
| March 25 | Vietnam International; Hanoi, Vietnam; International Challenge $15,000 – 64MS/32WS/32MD/32WD/32XD | (Indonesia) Hana Ramadhini; 21-14, 21-19 | (Thailand) Chochuwong Pornpawee |
| March 25 | Vietnam International; Hanoi, Vietnam; International Challenge $15,000 – 64MS/32WS/32MD/32WD/32XD | (Chinese Taipei) Liao Min-chun (Chinese Taipei) Yang Po-han; 30-28, 21-14 | (Hong Kong) Chan Yun Lung (Hong Kong) Wong Wai Hong |
| March 25 | Vietnam International; Hanoi, Vietnam; International Challenge $15,000 – 64MS/32WS/32MD/32WD/32XD | (Thailand) Narissapat Lam (Thailand) Puttita Supajirakul; 21-18, 17–21, 21-11 | (Hong Kong) Poon Lok Yan (Hong Kong) Tse Ying Suet |
| March 25 | Vietnam International; Hanoi, Vietnam; International Challenge $15,000 – 64MS/32WS/32MD/32WD/32XD | (Hong Kong) Chan Yun Lung (Hong Kong) Tse Ying Suet; 21-4, 17–21, 21-17 | (Hong Kong) Lee Chun Hei (Hong Kong) Chau Hoi Wah |
| March 25 | French International; Orléans, France; International Challenge $15,000 – 32MS/32WS/32MD/32WD/32XD | (England) Rajiv Ouseph; 21–15, 21–15 | (Denmark) Flemming Quach |
| March 25 | French International; Orléans, France; International Challenge $15,000 – 32MS/32WS/32MD/32WD/32XD | (Spain) Beatriz Corrales; 21–18, 21–15 | (Germany) Olga Konon |
| March 25 | French International; Orléans, France; International Challenge $15,000 – 32MS/32WS/32MD/32WD/32XD | (Poland) Adam Cwalina (Poland) Przemysław Wacha; 21–18, 21–16 | (France) Baptiste Careme (France) Gaetan Mittelheisser |
| March 25 | French International; Orléans, France; International Challenge $15,000 – 32MS/32WS/32MD/32WD/32XD | (Japan) Rie Eto (Japan) Yu Wakita; 21-17, 21-17 | (Malaysia) Amelia Alicia Anscelly (Malaysia) Soong Fie Cho |
| March 25 | French International; Orléans, France; International Challenge $15,000 – 32MS/32WS/32MD/32WD/32XD | (Scotland) Robert Blair (Scotland) Imogen Bankier; 21-17, 21-17 | (England) Marcus Ellis (England) Alyssa Lim |

=== April ===
| Week of | Tournament | Champions | Runners-up |
|---|---|---|---|
| April 1 | Australian Open; Sydney, Australia; Grand Prix Gold $120,000 – 64MS/32WS/32MD/32WD/32XD; Draw | (China) Tian Houwei; 20-22, 21–13, 21-12 | (China) Xue Song |
| April 1 | Australian Open; Sydney, Australia; Grand Prix Gold $120,000 – 64MS/32WS/32MD/32WD/32XD; Draw | (Japan) Sayaka Takahashi; 24–20, 21–10 | (Thailand) Nitchaon Jindapol |
| April 1 | Australian Open; Sydney, Australia; Grand Prix Gold $120,000 – 64MS/32WS/32MD/32WD/32XD; Draw | (Indonesia) Angga Pratama (Indonesia) Rian Agung Saputro; 20-22, 21–13, 21-12 | (Indonesia) Mohammad Ahsan (Indonesia) Hendra Setiawan |
| April 1 | Australian Open; Sydney, Australia; Grand Prix Gold $120,000 – 64MS/32WS/32MD/32WD/32XD; Draw | (Indonesia) Aprilsasi Putri Lejarsar Variella (Indonesia) Vita Marissa; 21–19, 21-15 | (Thailand) Sapsiree Taerattanachai (Thailand) Savitree Amitrapai |
| April 1 | Australian Open; Sydney, Australia; Grand Prix Gold $120,000 – 64MS/32WS/32MD/32WD/32XD; Draw | (Indonesia) Irfan Fadhilah (Indonesia) Weni Anggraini; 21-14, 22–24, 21-16 | (South Korea) Shin Baek-cheol (South Korea) Jang Ye-na |
| April 1 | Osaka International; Osaka, Japan; International Challenge $15,000 – 32MS/32WS/32MD/32WD/32XD | (Japan) Kazuteru Kozai; 21-15, 21-15 | (Japan) Jun Takemura |
| April 1 | Osaka International; Osaka, Japan; International Challenge $15,000 – 32MS/32WS/32MD/32WD/32XD | (Japan) Kaori Imabeppu; 22-20, 21-16 | (Japan) Akane Yamaguchi |
| April 1 | Osaka International; Osaka, Japan; International Challenge $15,000 – 32MS/32WS/32MD/32WD/32XD | (Japan) Kenta Kazuno (Japan) Kazushi Yamada; 21–14, 21–11 | (Japan) Takatoshi Kurose (Japan) Sho Zeniya |
| April 1 | Osaka International; Osaka, Japan; International Challenge $15,000 – 32MS/32WS/32MD/32WD/32XD | (Japan) Rie Eto (Japan) Yu Wakita; 21–10, 21-13 | (Japan) Yuriko Miki (Japan) Koharu Yonemoto |
| April 1 | Osaka International; Osaka, Japan; International Challenge $15,000 – 32MS/32WS/32MD/32WD/32XD | (Indonesia) Lukhi Apri Nugroho (Indonesia) Annisa Saufika; 21–16, 21-19 | (Chinese Taipei) Lin Chia-yu (Chinese Taipei) Wang Pei-rong |
| April 1 | Finnish Open; Vantaa, Finland; International Challenge $15,000 – 32MS/32WS/32MD/16WD/32XD | (England) Rajiv Ouseph; 21-16, 21-12 | (Ukraine) Dmytro Zavadsky |
| April 1 | Finnish Open; Vantaa, Finland; International Challenge $15,000 – 32MS/32WS/32MD/16WD/32XD | (Spain) Carolina Marín; 21–10, 21–15 | (Spain) Beatriz Corrales |
| April 1 | Finnish Open; Vantaa, Finland; International Challenge $15,000 – 32MS/32WS/32MD/16WD/32XD | (Malaysia) Nelson Heg (Malaysia) Teo Ee Yi; 21–14, 21–12 | (Malaysia) Mohd Lutfi Zaim Abdul Khalid (Malaysia) Tan Wee Gieen |
| April 1 | Finnish Open; Vantaa, Finland; International Challenge $15,000 – 32MS/32WS/32MD/16WD/32XD | (Scotland) Imogen Bankier (Bulgaria) Petya Nedelcheva; 21–10, 21–24 | (Denmark) Lena Grebak (Denmark) Maria Helsbøl |
| April 1 | Finnish Open; Vantaa, Finland; International Challenge $15,000 – 32MS/32WS/32MD/16WD/32XD | (Denmark) Anders Skaarup Rasmussen (Denmark) Lena Grebak; 31-21, 21–15, 21-11 | (Ukraine) Valeriy Atrashchenkov (Ukraine) Anna Kobceva |
| April 8 | Peru International; Lima, Peru; International Challenge $15,000 – 32MS/32WS/32MD/16WD/32XD | (Cuba) Osleni Guerrero; 17,21, 21–13, 21-11 | (Israel) Misha Zilbermann |
| April 8 | Peru International; Lima, Peru; International Challenge $15,000 – 32MS/32WS/32MD/16WD/32XD | (Canada) Christin Tsai; 21–11, 21–12 | (Canada) Nicole Grether |
| April 8 | Peru International; Lima, Peru; International Challenge $15,000 – 32MS/32WS/32MD/16WD/32XD | (Netherlands) Ruud Bosch (Netherlands) Koen Ridder; 21–18, 21–11 | (United States) Phillip Chew (United States) Sattawat Pongnairat |
| April 8 | Peru International; Lima, Peru; International Challenge $15,000 – 32MS/32WS/32MD/16WD/32XD | (Canada) Grace Gao (Canada) Michelle Li; 21–15, 21–18 | (Canada) Joycelin Ko (Canada) Christin Tsai |
| April 8 | Peru International; Lima, Peru; International Challenge $15,000 – 32MS/32WS/32MD/16WD/32XD | (Canada) Toby Ng (Canada) Grace Gao; 21–12, 23–25, 21–17 | (United States) Phillip Chew (United States) Jamie Subandhi |
| April 8 | New Zealand Open; Auckland, New Zealand; Grand Prix $50,000 – 64MS/32WS/32MD/32WD/32XD; Draw | (Japan) Riichi Takeshita; 21-16, 16–21, 21-17 | (China) Xue Song |
| April 8 | New Zealand Open; Auckland, New Zealand; Grand Prix $50,000 – 64MS/32WS/32MD/32WD/32XD; Draw | (China) Deng Xuan; 21-17, 18–21, 22-20 | (Japan) Akane Yamaguchi |
| April 8 | New Zealand Open; Auckland, New Zealand; Grand Prix $50,000 – 64MS/32WS/32MD/32WD/32XD; Draw | (Indonesia) Angga Pratama (Indonesia) Rian Agung Saputro; 21-6, 22-20 | (China) Li Junhui (China) Liu Yuchen |
| April 8 | New Zealand Open; Auckland, New Zealand; Grand Prix $50,000 – 64MS/32WS/32MD/32WD/32XD; Draw | (China) Ou Dongni (China) Tang Yuanting; 21-15, 11–21, 21-19 | (Malaysia) Vivian Hoo (Malaysia) Woon Khe Wei |
| April 8 | New Zealand Open; Auckland, New Zealand; Grand Prix $50,000 – 64MS/32WS/32MD/32WD/32XD; Draw | (Indonesia) Praveen Jordan (Indonesia) Vita Marissa; 21–18, 21–8 | (Indonesia) Riky Widianto (Indonesia) Richi Puspita Dili |
| April 8 | Croatian International; Zagreb, Croatia; International Series $5,000 – 32MS/32WS/32MD/16WD/32XD | (Italy) Wisnu Haryo Putro; 19-21,21-18,25-23 | (Sweden) Mathias Borg |
| April 8 | Croatian International; Zagreb, Croatia; International Series $5,000 – 32MS/32WS/32MD/16WD/32XD | (Russia) Natalia Perminova; 21–14, 21–15 | (Denmark) Sandra-Maria Jensen |
| April 8 | Croatian International; Zagreb, Croatia; International Series $5,000 – 32MS/32WS/32MD/16WD/32XD | (Indonesia) Christopher Rusdianto (Indonesia) Trikusuma Wardhana; 21–14, 22-20 | (Croatia) Zvonimir Đurkinjak (Croatia) Zvonimir Hölbling |
| April 8 | Croatian International; Zagreb, Croatia; International Series $5,000 – 32MS/32WS/32MD/16WD/32XD | (Russia) Irina Khlebko (Russia) Ksenia Polikarpova; 21–19, 21–19 | (Denmark) Julie Finne-Ipsen (Denmark) Rikke Søby Hansen |
| April 8 | Croatian International; Zagreb, Croatia; International Series $5,000 – 32MS/32WS/32MD/16WD/32XD | (Denmark) Niclas Nøhr (Denmark) Rikke Søby Hansen; 12-21, 21–12, 21-9 | (Denmark) Frederik Colberg (Denmark) Sara Thygesen |
| April 15 | Badminton Asia Championships; Taipei, Chinese Taipei; Continental Championships $200,000 – 64MS/32WS/32MD/32WD/32XD; Draw | (China) Du Pengyu; 21–17, 21–19 | (China) Chen Long |
| April 15 | Badminton Asia Championships; Taipei, Chinese Taipei; Continental Championships $200,000 – 64MS/32WS/32MD/32WD/32XD; Draw | (China) Wang Yihan; 21-15, 21-13 | (China) Li Xuerui |
| April 15 | Badminton Asia Championships; Taipei, Chinese Taipei; Continental Championships $200,000 – 64MS/32WS/32MD/32WD/32XD; Draw | (South Korea) Ko Sung-hyun (South Korea) Lee Yong-dae; 21-13, 22-20 | (South Korea) Kim Sa-rang (South Korea) Kim Gi-jung |
| April 15 | Badminton Asia Championships; Taipei, Chinese Taipei; Continental Championships $200,000 – 64MS/32WS/32MD/32WD/32XD; Draw | (China) Wang Xiaoli (China) Yu Yang; 21-15, 14–21, 21-15 | (China) Ma Jin (China) Tang Jinhua |
| April 15 | Badminton Asia Championships; Taipei, Chinese Taipei; Continental Championships $200,000 – 64MS/32WS/32MD/32WD/32XD; Draw | (South Korea) Ko Sung-hyun (South Korea) Kim Ha-na; 22-20, 21-17 | (China) Zhang Nan (China) Zhao Yunlei |
| April 15 | Tahiti International; Punaauia, Tahiti; International Challenge $15,000 – 32MS/32WS/16MD/16WD/32XD | (France) Brice Leverdez; 21–14, 21–6 | (France) Matthieu Lo Ying Ping |
| April 15 | Tahiti International; Punaauia, Tahiti; International Challenge $15,000 – 32MS/32WS/16MD/16WD/32XD | (Thailand) Salakjit Ponsana; 16-21, 21–12, 21-19 | (France) Sashina Vignes Waran |
| April 15 | Tahiti International; Punaauia, Tahiti; International Challenge $15,000 – 32MS/32WS/16MD/16WD/32XD | (Netherlands) Ruud Bosch (Netherlands) Koen Ridder; 21-13, 21-10 | (France) Laurent Constantin (France) Matthieu Lo Ying Ping |
| April 15 | Tahiti International; Punaauia, Tahiti; International Challenge $15,000 – 32MS/32WS/16MD/16WD/32XD | (Canada) Nicole Grether (Canada) Charmaine Reid; 21-4, 21-11 | (New Zealand) Amanda Brown (New Zealand) Kritteka Gregory |
| April 15 | Tahiti International; Punaauia, Tahiti; International Challenge $15,000 – 32MS/32WS/16MD/16WD/32XD | (Netherlands) Ruud Bosch (Thailand) Salakjit Ponsana; 21-18, 21-15 | (France) Laurent Constantin (France) Teshana Vignes Waran |
| April 15 | Dutch International; Wateringen, Netherland; International Challenge $15,000 – 32MS/32WS/32MD/32WD/32XD | (Denmark) Viktor Axelsen; 24-22, 21-12 | (Netherlands) Eric Pang |
| April 15 | Dutch International; Wateringen, Netherland; International Challenge $15,000 – 32MS/32WS/32MD/32WD/32XD | (Spain) Beatriz Corrales; 21–16, 21-18 | (Germany) Karin Schnaase |
| April 15 | Dutch International; Wateringen, Netherland; International Challenge $15,000 – 32MS/32WS/32MD/32WD/32XD | (Poland) Łukasz Moreń (Poland) Wojciech Szkudlarczyk; 21–13, 18–21, 21-9 | (England) Christopher Coles (England) Matthew Nottingham |
| April 15 | Dutch International; Wateringen, Netherland; International Challenge $15,000 – 32MS/32WS/32MD/32WD/32XD | (Japan) Rie Eto (Japan) Yu Wakita; 14-21, 21–18, 21-12 | (Scotland) Imogen Bankier (Bulgaria) Petya Nedelcheva |
| April 15 | Dutch International; Wateringen, Netherland; International Challenge $15,000 – 32MS/32WS/32MD/32WD/32XD | (Germany) Michael Fuchs (Germany) Birgit Michels; 21–14, 18–21, 21–17 | (Republic of Ireland) Sam Magee (Republic of Ireland) Chloe Magee |
| April 22 | India Open; New Delhi, India; Super Series $200,000 – 32MS/32WS/32MD/32WD/32XD; Draw | (Malaysia) Lee Chong Wei; 21–15, 18–21, 21-17 | (Japan) Kenichi Tago |
| April 22 | India Open; New Delhi, India; Super Series $200,000 – 32MS/32WS/32MD/32WD/32XD; Draw | (Thailand) Ratchanok Intanon; 22-20, 21–14 | (Germany) Juliane Schenk |
| April 22 | India Open; New Delhi, India; Super Series $200,000 – 32MS/32WS/32MD/32WD/32XD; Draw | (China) Liu Xiaolong (China) Qiu Zihan; 22–20, 21–18 | (South Korea) Ko Sung-hyun (South Korea) Lee Yong-dae |
| April 22 | India Open; New Delhi, India; Super Series $200,000 – 32MS/32WS/32MD/32WD/32XD; Draw | (Japan) Miyuki Maeda (Japan) Satoko Suetsuna; 12-21, 23–21, 21–18 | (Denmark) Christinna Pedersen (Denmark) Kamilla Rytter Juhl |
| April 22 | India Open; New Delhi, India; Super Series $200,000 – 32MS/32WS/32MD/32WD/32XD; Draw | (Indonesia) Tontowi Ahmad (Indonesia) Liliyana Natsir; 21–16, 21–13 | (South Korea) Ko Sung-hyun (South Korea) Kim Ha-na |
| April 22 | Portugal International; Caldas da Rainha, Portugal; International Series $5,000 – 32MS/32WS/32MD/32WD/32XD | (Malaysia) Misbun Ramdan Misbun; 21–8, 21-9 | (Spain) Pablo Abián |
| April 22 | Portugal International; Caldas da Rainha, Portugal; International Series $5,000 – 32MS/32WS/32MD/32WD/32XD | (Russia) Ella Diehl; 16-21, 21–16, 21-19 | (Russia) Ksenia Polikarpova |
| April 22 | Portugal International; Caldas da Rainha, Portugal; International Series $5,000 – 32MS/32WS/32MD/32WD/32XD | (Denmark) Kim Astrup (Denmark) Anders Skaarup Rasmussen; 21–18, 21–14 | (England) Peter Briggs (England) Harley Towler |
| April 22 | Portugal International; Caldas da Rainha, Portugal; International Series $5,000 – 32MS/32WS/32MD/32WD/32XD | (Denmark) Lena Grebak (Denmark) Maria Helsbøl; 21–19, 15–21, 21-17 | (Indonesia) Keshya Nurvita Hanadia (Indonesia) Devi Tika Permatasari |
| April 22 | Portugal International; Caldas da Rainha, Portugal; International Series $5,000 – 32MS/32WS/32MD/32WD/32XD | (Germany) Jones Ralfy Jansen (Indonesia) Keshya Nurvita Hanadia; 21–16, -18-21, 21-16 | (Denmark) Anders Skaarup Rasmussen (Denmark) Lena Grebak |
| April 29 | Malaysia Masters; Kuala Lumpur, Malaysia; Grand Prix Gold $120,000 – 64MS/32WS/32MD/32WD/32XD; Draw | (Indonesia) Alamsyah Yunus; 10-21, 21–9, 21-19 | (Malaysia) Goh Soon Huat |
| April 29 | Malaysia Masters; Kuala Lumpur, Malaysia; Grand Prix Gold $120,000 – 64MS/32WS/32MD/32WD/32XD; Draw | (India) P. V. Sindhu; 21-17, 17–21, 21-19 | (Singapore) Gu Juan |
| April 29 | Malaysia Masters; Kuala Lumpur, Malaysia; Grand Prix Gold $120,000 – 64MS/32WS/32MD/32WD/32XD; Draw | (Malaysia) Goh V Shem (Malaysia) Lim Khim Wah; 22-20, 21-15 | (Malaysia) Koo Kien Keat (Malaysia) Tan Boon Heong |
| April 29 | Malaysia Masters; Kuala Lumpur, Malaysia; Grand Prix Gold $120,000 – 64MS/32WS/32MD/32WD/32XD; Draw | (Indonesia) Pia Zebadiah Bernadet (Indonesia) Rizki Amelia Pradipta; 21-17, 16–21, 21-17 | (Indonesia) Aprilsasi Putri Lejarsar Variella (Indonesia) Vita Marissa |
| April 29 | Malaysia Masters; Kuala Lumpur, Malaysia; Grand Prix Gold $120,000 – 64MS/32WS/32MD/32WD/32XD; Draw | (Indonesia) Praveen Jordan (Indonesia) Vita Marissa; 20-22, 21–13, 21-17 | (Malaysia) Tan Aik Quan (Malaysia) Lai Pei Jing |
| April 29 | Smiling Fish International; Trang, Thailand; International Series $5,000 – 32MS/32WS/32MD/32WD/32XD | (Thailand) Sitthikom Thammasin; 21-11, 21-16 | (Thailand) Parinyawat Thongnuam |
| April 29 | Smiling Fish International; Trang, Thailand; International Series $5,000 – 32MS/32WS/32MD/32WD/32XD | (Thailand) Rawinda Prajongjai; 21–9, 21–19 | (Malaysia) Ho Yen Mei |
| April 29 | Smiling Fish International; Trang, Thailand; International Series $5,000 – 32MS/32WS/32MD/32WD/32XD | (Thailand) Wannawat Ampunsuwan (Thailand) Patiphat Chalardchaleam; 22-20, 16–21, 21-15 | (Thailand) Vasin Nilyoke (Thailand) Suwat Phaisansomsuk |
| April 29 | Smiling Fish International; Trang, Thailand; International Series $5,000 – 32MS/32WS/32MD/32WD/32XD | (Thailand) Narissapat Lam (Thailand) Puttita Supajirakul; 21–17, 21–10 | (Thailand) Rodjana Chuthabunditkul (Thailand) Jongkolphan Kititharakul |
| April 29 | Smiling Fish International; Trang, Thailand; International Series $5,000 – 32MS/32WS/32MD/32WD/32XD | (Thailand) Patiphat Chalardchaleam (Thailand) Jongkolphan Kititharakul; 21–12, 21–11 | (Thailand) Wannawat Ampunsuwan (Thailand) Rodjana Chuthabunditkul |
| April 29 | Denmark International; Frederikshavn, Denmark; International Challenge $15,000 – 32MS/32WS/32MD/32WD/32XD | (Denmark) Viktor Axelsen; 21–17, 21-8 | (Finland) Ville Lång |
| April 29 | Denmark International; Frederikshavn, Denmark; International Challenge $15,000 – 32MS/32WS/32MD/32WD/32XD | (Germany) Olga Konon; 21–15, 21–10 | (Denmark) Mette Poulsen |
| April 29 | Denmark International; Frederikshavn, Denmark; International Challenge $15,000 – 32MS/32WS/32MD/32WD/32XD | (England) Marcus Ellis (Scotland) Paul van Rietvelde; 25-23, 16–21, 21-19 | (Denmark) Kim Astrup (Denmark) Anders Skaarup Rasmussen |
| April 29 | Denmark International; Frederikshavn, Denmark; International Challenge $15,000 – 32MS/32WS/32MD/32WD/32XD | (Denmark) Line Damkjær Kruse (Denmark) Marie Røpke; 22-20, 21–11 | (Sweden) Emelie Lennartsson (Sweden) Emma Wengberg |
| April 29 | Denmark International; Frederikshavn, Denmark; International Challenge $15,000 – 32MS/32WS/32MD/32WD/32XD | (Denmark) Anders Skaarup Rasmussen (Denmark) Lena Grebak; 21–16, 21–8 | (Denmark) Kim Astrup (Denmark) Maria Helsbøl |

=== May ===
| Week of | Tournament | Champions | Runners-up |
|---|---|---|---|
| May 6 | European University Championships; Uppsala, Sweden; Multi-sports events (University); 15XT/32MS/32WS/32MD/32WD/32XD | (Finland) University of Helsinki; 3–1 | (France) University of Rouen |
| May 6 | European University Championships; Uppsala, Sweden; Multi-sports events (University); 15XT/32MS/32WS/32MD/32WD/32XD | (Germany) Sven Eric Kastens; Saarland University | (Germany) Alexander Roovers; University of Duisburg-Essen |
| May 6 | European University Championships; Uppsala, Sweden; Multi-sports events (University); 15XT/32MS/32WS/32MD/32WD/32XD | (Germany) Anika Dörr; University of Duisburg-Essen | (Germany) Mona Lea Reich; University of Mainz |
| May 6 | European University Championships; Uppsala, Sweden; Multi-sports events (University); 15XT/32MS/32WS/32MD/32WD/32XD | (Russia) Mikhail Loktev (Russia) Vadim Novoselov; Saratov State University | (Sweden) Sebastian Gransbo (Sweden) Peder Nordin; Stockholm University |
| May 6 | European University Championships; Uppsala, Sweden; Multi-sports events (University); 15XT/32MS/32WS/32MD/32WD/32XD | (Germany) Anika Dörr (Germany) Laura Wich; University of Duisburg-Essen | (Russia) Anastasia Dobrynina (Russia) Viktoriia Vorobeva; Volga Region State Academy |
| May 6 | European University Championships; Uppsala, Sweden; Multi-sports events (University); 15XT/32MS/32WS/32MD/32WD/32XD | (Finland) Anton Kaisti (Finland) Sanna Rautala; University of Helsinki | (Russia) Ryhor Varabyou (Russia) Viktoriia Vorobeva; Volga Region State Academy |
| May 6 | Slovenia International; Medvode, Slovenia; International Series $5,000 – 32MS/32WS/32MD/32WD/32XD | (Malaysia) Misbun Ramdan Mohmed Misbun; 21-11,21-12 | (France) Lucas Corvee |
| May 6 | Slovenia International; Medvode, Slovenia; International Series $5,000 – 32MS/32WS/32MD/32WD/32XD | (Ukraine) Marija Ulitina; 21–11, 21–12 | (Denmark) Lene Clausen |
| May 6 | Slovenia International; Medvode, Slovenia; International Series $5,000 – 32MS/32WS/32MD/32WD/32XD | (Russia) Nikita Khakimov (Russia) Vasily Kuznetsov; 21–19, 21-16 | (England) Christopher Coles (England) Matthew Nottingham |
| May 6 | Slovenia International; Medvode, Slovenia; International Series $5,000 – 32MS/32WS/32MD/32WD/32XD | (Netherlands) Alida Chen (Netherlands) Soraya De Visch Eijbergen; 11-21, 21–14, 21-14 | (Ukraine) Natalya Voytsekh (Ukraine) Yelyzaveta Zharka |
| May 6 | Slovenia International; Medvode, Slovenia; International Series $5,000 – 32MS/32WS/32MD/32WD/32XD | (Croatia) Zvonimir Durkinjak (Croatia) Stasa Poznanovic; 21–12, 21–18 | (Germany) Jones Rafli Jansen (Germany) Cisita Joity Jansen |
| May 6 | Hellas International; Loutraki, Greece; International Series $5,000 – 32MS/32WS/32MD/16WD/32XD | (Malaysia) Misbun Ramdan Mohmed Misbun; 21-14, 21-13 | (Czech Republic) Jan Frohlich |
| May 6 | Hellas International; Loutraki, Greece; International Series $5,000 – 32MS/32WS/32MD/16WD/32XD | (Bulgaria) Linda Zetchiri; 21-14, 21-19 | (Switzerland) Nicole Schaller |
| May 6 | Hellas International; Loutraki, Greece; International Series $5,000 – 32MS/32WS/32MD/16WD/32XD | (Russia) Nikolaj Nikolaenko (Russia) Nikolai Ukk; 21-14, 21-16 | (Vietnam) Tuan Duc Do (Vietnam) Hong Nam Pham |
| May 6 | Hellas International; Loutraki, Greece; International Series $5,000 – 32MS/32WS/32MD/16WD/32XD | (Turkey) Cemre Fere (Turkey) Neslihan Kilic; Walkover | (Netherlands) Alida Chen (Netherlands) Soraya De Visch Eijbergen |
| May 6 | Hellas International; Loutraki, Greece; International Series $5,000 – 32MS/32WS/32MD/16WD/32XD | (Denmark) Rene Mattisson (Denmark) Tilde Iversen; 21-18, 21-16 | (Turkey) Sİnan Zorlu (Turkey) Neslihan Kilic |
| May 20 | Sudirman Cup; Bukit Jalil, Kuala Lumpur, Malaysia; BWF Mixed Team Championships; Draw | China; 3–0 | South Korea |
| May 20 | Spanish Open; Madrid, Spain; International Challenge $15,000 – 32MS/32WS/32MD/32WD/32XD | (Denmark) Hans-Kristian Vittinghus; 21-9, 21-16 | (Denmark) Joachim Persson |
| May 20 | Spanish Open; Madrid, Spain; International Challenge $15,000 – 32MS/32WS/32MD/32WD/32XD | (Spain) Beatriz Corrales; 21-19, 21-18 | (Spain) Carolina Marín |
| May 20 | Spanish Open; Madrid, Spain; International Challenge $15,000 – 32MS/32WS/32MD/32WD/32XD | (Poland) Adam Cwalina (Poland) Przemyslaw Wacha; 21-10, 18–21, 21-19 | (Poland) Michal Logosz (Poland) Lukasz Moren |
| May 20 | Spanish Open; Madrid, Spain; International Challenge $15,000 – 32MS/32WS/32MD/32WD/32XD | (England) Heather Olver (England) Kate Robertshaw; 18-21, 21–13, 22-20 | (Denmark) Maiken Fruergaard (Denmark) Sara Thygesen |
| May 20 | Spanish Open; Madrid, Spain; International Challenge $15,000 – 32MS/32WS/32MD/32WD/32XD | (Denmark) Anders Skaarup Rasmussen (Denmark) Lena Grebak; 21–14, 21-18 | (Poland) Wojciech Szkudlarczyk (Poland) Agnieszka Wojtkowska |
| May 27 | European Club Championships; Beauvais, France; CC Team Championships; 19 teams | (Russia) Primorye Vladivostok; 4–1 | (Denmark) Team Skælskør-Slagelse |
| May 27 | Mercosul International; Foz do Iguaçu, Brazil; International Series $5,000 – 32MS/32WS/32MD/8WD/32XD | (Czech Republic) Jan Frohlich; 21-15, 21-16 | (Israel) Misha Zilberman |
| May 27 | Mercosul International; Foz do Iguaçu, Brazil; International Series $5,000 – 32MS/32WS/32MD/8WD/32XD | (Slovenia) Maja Tvrdy; 21-11, 21-13 | (Brazil) Lohaynny Vicente |
| May 27 | Mercosul International; Foz do Iguaçu, Brazil; International Series $5,000 – 32MS/32WS/32MD/8WD/32XD | (Brazil) Hugo Arthuso (Brazil) Alex Yuwan Tjong; 22-20, 21-15 | (Czech Republic) Jan Frohlich (Czech Republic) Svata Zdenek |
| May 27 | Mercosul International; Foz do Iguaçu, Brazil; International Series $5,000 – 32MS/32WS/32MD/8WD/32XD | (Brazil) Paula Pereira (Brazil) Lohaynny Vicente; 21–10, 21-12 | (Chile) Tingting Chou (Chile) Camila Macaya |
| May 27 | Mercosul International; Foz do Iguaçu, Brazil; International Series $5,000 – 32MS/32WS/32MD/8WD/32XD | (Mexico) Lino Munoz (Mexico) Cynthia Gonzalez; 21-16, 21-16 | (Brazil) Hugo Arthuso (Brazil) Fabiana Silva |

=== June ===
| Week of | Tournament | Champions | Runners-up |
|---|---|---|---|
| June 3 | Thailand Open; Bangkok, Thailand; Grand Prix Gold $120,000 – 64MS/32WS/32MD/32WD/32XD; Draw | (India) Srikanth Kidambi; 21–16, 21-12 | (Thailand) Boonsak Ponsana |
| June 3 | Thailand Open; Bangkok, Thailand; Grand Prix Gold $120,000 – 64MS/32WS/32MD/32WD/32XD; Draw | (Thailand) Ratchanok Intanon; 20-22, 21–19, 21-13 | (Thailand) Busanan Ongbamrungphan |
| June 3 | Thailand Open; Bangkok, Thailand; Grand Prix Gold $120,000 – 64MS/32WS/32MD/32WD/32XD; Draw | (South Korea) Shin Baek-cheol (South Korea) Yoo Yeon-seong; 18-21, 21–15, 21-14 | (Russia) Vladimir Ivanov (Russia) Ivan Sozonov |
| June 3 | Thailand Open; Bangkok, Thailand; Grand Prix Gold $120,000 – 64MS/32WS/32MD/32WD/32XD; Draw | (Indonesia) Nitya Krishinda Maheswari (Indonesia) Greysia Polii; 21-7, 21-13 | (Japan) Yuriko Miki (Japan) Koharu Yonemoto |
| June 3 | Thailand Open; Bangkok, Thailand; Grand Prix Gold $120,000 – 64MS/32WS/32MD/32WD/32XD; Draw | (Indonesia) Markis Kido (Indonesia) Pia Zebadiah Bernadet; 18-21, 21–15, 21-15 | (Indonesia) Riky Widianto (Indonesia) Richi Puspita Dili |
| June 3 | Maldives International; Malé, Maldives; International Challenge $15,000 – 64MS/32WS/32MD/32WD/32XD | (Indonesia) Fikri Ikhsandi Hadmadi; 21–16, 23-21 | (Indonesia) Muhammad Bayu Pangisthu |
| June 3 | Maldives International; Malé, Maldives; International Challenge $15,000 – 64MS/32WS/32MD/32WD/32XD | (Canada) Michelle Li; 21-8, 21-13 | (Indonesia) Hanna Ramadini |
| June 3 | Maldives International; Malé, Maldives; International Challenge $15,000 – 64MS/32WS/32MD/32WD/32XD | (Chinese Taipei) Tien Tzu-chieh (Chinese Taipei) Wang Chi-lin; 21-15, 21-17 | (Indonesia) Arya Maulana Aldiartama (Indonesia) Alfian Eko Prasetya |
| June 3 | Maldives International; Malé, Maldives; International Challenge $15,000 – 64MS/32WS/32MD/32WD/32XD | (Indonesia) Maretha Dea Giovani (Indonesia) Melvira Oklamona; 21-15, 21-15 | (Indonesia) Melati Daeva Oktavianti (Indonesia) Rosyita Eka Putri Sari |
| June 3 | Maldives International; Malé, Maldives; International Challenge $15,000 – 64MS/32WS/32MD/32WD/32XD | (India) K. Nandagopal (India) K. Maneesha; 21-16, 23-21 | (South Korea) Kim Dae-sung (South Korea) Oh Bo-kyung |
| June 3 | Argentina International; Buenos Aires, Argentina; Future Series $5,000 – 64MS/32WS/16MD/8WD/32XD | (France) Arnaud Génin; 18-21, 21–19, 21-17 | (Czech Republic) Jan Fröhlich |
| June 3 | Argentina International; Buenos Aires, Argentina; Future Series $5,000 – 64MS/32WS/16MD/8WD/32XD | (Brazil) Lohaynny Vicente; 21-12, 21-4 | (Mexico) Cynthia González |
| June 3 | Argentina International; Buenos Aires, Argentina; Future Series $5,000 – 64MS/32WS/16MD/8WD/32XD | (Brazil) Hugo Arthuso (Brazil) Alex Yuwan Tjong; 21-18, 21-19 | (Peru) Andres Corpancho (Peru) Gonzalo Duany |
| June 3 | Argentina International; Buenos Aires, Argentina; Future Series $5,000 – 64MS/32WS/16MD/8WD/32XD | (Brazil) Paula Pereira (Brazil) Lohaynny Vicente; 21-11, 21-11 | (Peru) Daniela Macias (Peru) Luz María Zornoza |
| June 3 | Argentina International; Buenos Aires, Argentina; Future Series $5,000 – 64MS/32WS/16MD/8WD/32XD | (Mexico) Lino Muñoz (Mexico) Cynthia González; 21-18, 9-21, 21-16 | (Brazil) Hugo Arthuso (Brazil) Fabiana Silva |
| June 3 | Lithuanian International; Kaunas, Lithuania; Future Series; 32MS/32WS/32MD/16WD/32XD | (Poland) Adrian Dziółko; 23-21, 21-13 | (Estonia) Raul Must |
| June 3 | Lithuanian International; Kaunas, Lithuania; Future Series; 32MS/32WS/32MD/16WD/32XD | (Lithuania) Akvilė Stapušaitytė; 21-18, 21-15 | (Denmark) Anne Hald Jensen |
| June 3 | Lithuanian International; Kaunas, Lithuania; Future Series; 32MS/32WS/32MD/16WD/32XD | (Russia) Andrey Ashmarin (Russia) Anatoliy Yartsev; 21-18, 21-16 | (Russia) Konstantin Abramov (Russia) Yaroslav Egerev |
| June 3 | Lithuanian International; Kaunas, Lithuania; Future Series; 32MS/32WS/32MD/16WD/32XD | (Russia) Irina Khlebko (Russia) Ksenia Polikarpova; 21-10, 21-13 | (Netherlands) Alida Chen (Netherlands) Gayle Mahulette |
| June 3 | Lithuanian International; Kaunas, Lithuania; Future Series; 32MS/32WS/32MD/16WD/32XD | (Russia) Andrey Ashmarin (Russia) Ekaterina Bolotova; 21-15, 21-14 | (Russia) Yaroslav Egerev (Russia) Irina Khlebko |
| June 10 | Indonesia Open; Jakarta, Indonesia; Super Series Premier $700,000 – 32MS/32WS/32MD/32WD/32XD; Draw | (Malaysia) Lee Chong Wei; 21-15, 21-14 | (Germany) Marc Zwiebler |
| June 10 | Indonesia Open; Jakarta, Indonesia; Super Series Premier $700,000 – 32MS/32WS/32MD/32WD/32XD; Draw | (China) Li Xuerui; 21-16, 18–21, 21-17 | (Germany) Juliane Schenk |
| June 10 | Indonesia Open; Jakarta, Indonesia; Super Series Premier $700,000 – 32MS/32WS/32MD/32WD/32XD; Draw | (Indonesia) Mohammad Ahsan (Indonesia) Hendra Setiawan; 21-14, 21-18 | (South Korea) Ko Sung-hyun (South Korea) Lee Yong-dae |
| June 10 | Indonesia Open; Jakarta, Indonesia; Super Series Premier $700,000 – 32MS/32WS/32MD/32WD/32XD; Draw | (China) Bao Yixin (China) Cheng Shu; 15,21, 21–18, 21-18 | (China) Wang Xiaoli (China) Yu Yang |
| June 10 | Indonesia Open; Jakarta, Indonesia; Super Series Premier $700,000 – 32MS/32WS/32MD/32WD/32XD; Draw | (China) Zhang Nan (China) Zhao Yunlei; 24-22, 20–22, 21-12 | (Denmark) Joachim Fischer Nielsen (Denmark) Christinna Pedersen |
| June 17 | Singapore Open; Singapore; Super Series $200,000 – 32MS/32WS/32MD/32WD/32XD; Draw | (Indonesia) Tommy Sugiarto; 20-22, 21–5, 21-17 | (Thailand) Boonsak Ponsana |
| June 17 | Singapore Open; Singapore; Super Series $200,000 – 32MS/32WS/32MD/32WD/32XD; Draw | (China) Wang Yihan; 21-18, 21-12 | (China) Li Xuerui |
| June 17 | Singapore Open; Singapore; Super Series $200,000 – 32MS/32WS/32MD/32WD/32XD; Draw | (Indonesia) Mohammad Ahsan (Indonesia) Hendra Setiawan; 21-15, 21-18 | (South Korea) Ko Sung-hyun (South Korea) Lee Yong-dae |
| June 17 | Singapore Open; Singapore; Super Series $200,000 – 32MS/32WS/32MD/32WD/32XD; Draw | (China) Tian Qing (China) Zhao Yunlei; 21-19, 21-16 | (Japan) Misaki Matsutomo (Japan) Ayaka Takahashi |
| June 17 | Singapore Open; Singapore; Super Series $200,000 – 32MS/32WS/32MD/32WD/32XD; Draw | (Indonesia) Tontowi Ahmad (Indonesia) Liliyana Natsir; 21-12, 21-12 | (South Korea) Yoo Yeon-seong (South Korea) Eom Hye-won |
| June 17 | Auckland International; Auckland, New Zealand; International Series $5,000 – 64MS/32WS/32MD/16WD/32XD | (New Zealand) Joe Wu; 21–16, 22-20 | (Malaysia) Yogendran Khrishnan |
| June 17 | Auckland International; Auckland, New Zealand; International Series $5,000 – 64MS/32WS/32MD/16WD/32XD | (England) Tracey Hallam; 21–15, 21–16 | (England) Fontaine Mica Chapman |
| June 17 | Auckland International; Auckland, New Zealand; International Series $5,000 – 64MS/32WS/32MD/16WD/32XD | (Australia) Robin Middleton (Australia) Ross Smith; 21–16, 21–8 | (Australia) Raymond Tam (Australia) Glenn Warfe |
| June 17 | Auckland International; Auckland, New Zealand; International Series $5,000 – 64MS/32WS/32MD/16WD/32XD | (England) Tracey Hallam (Australia) Renuga Veeran; 21–14, 21–9 | (Vietnam) Lê Thu Huyền (Vietnam) Phạm Như Thảo |
| June 17 | Auckland International; Auckland, New Zealand; International Series $5,000 – 64MS/32WS/32MD/16WD/32XD | (Australia) Ross Smith (Australia) Renuga Veeran; 21–16, 21–12 | (Australia) Raymond Tam (Australia) Gronya Somerville |
| June 14 | Canadian International; Ottawa, Ontario, Canada; International Challenge $15,000 – 64MS/32WS/32MD/16WD/32XD | (Netherlands) Eric Pang; 24-22, 21-16 | (Denmark) Joachim Persson |
| June 14 | Canadian International; Ottawa, Ontario, Canada; International Challenge $15,000 – 64MS/32WS/32MD/16WD/32XD | (Canada) Michelle Li; 21-14, 21-19 | (Canada) Christin Tsai |
| June 14 | Canadian International; Ottawa, Ontario, Canada; International Challenge $15,000 – 64MS/32WS/32MD/16WD/32XD | (Chinese Taipei) Hsu Jui-ting (Chinese Taipei) Tien Jen-chieh; 21-14, 17–21, 21-16 | (Canada) Adrian Liu (Canada) Derrick Ng |
| June 14 | Canadian International; Ottawa, Ontario, Canada; International Challenge $15,000 – 64MS/32WS/32MD/16WD/32XD | (United States) Eva Lee (United States) Paula Lynn Obañana; 21-15, 21-14 | (Canada) Alex Bruce (Canada) Phyllis Chan |
| June 14 | Canadian International; Ottawa, Ontario, Canada; International Challenge $15,000 – 64MS/32WS/32MD/16WD/32XD | (England) Nathan Robertson (England) Jenny Wallwork; 21-9, 21-12 | (Canada) Toby Ng (Canada) Alex Bruce |
| June 14 | Kenya International; Nairobi, Kenya; Future Series; 32MS/32WS/16MD/8WD/8XD | (India) Subhankar Dey; 21-19, 21-19 | (Nigeria) Gideon Babalola |
| June 14 | Kenya International; Nairobi, Kenya; Future Series; 32MS/32WS/16MD/8WD/8XD | (Nigeria) Grace Gabriel; 21-8, 15–21, 21-18 | (Uganda) Bridget Shamim Bangi |
| June 14 | Kenya International; Nairobi, Kenya; Future Series; 32MS/32WS/16MD/8WD/8XD | (Nigeria) Enejoh Abah (Nigeria) Victor Makanju; 21-17, 21-15 | (Nigeria) Adamu J (India) Siddhrath Saboo |
| June 14 | Kenya International; Nairobi, Kenya; Future Series; 32MS/32WS/16MD/8WD/8XD | (Nigeria) Dorcas Ajoke Adesokan (Nigeria) Grace Gabriel; 21-18, 21-9 | (Uganda) Bridget Shamim Bangi (Uganda) Margaret Nankabirwa |
| June 14 | Kenya International; Nairobi, Kenya; Future Series; 32MS/32WS/16MD/8WD/8XD | (Kenya) Patrick Kinyua Mbogo (Kenya) Mercy Joseph; 21-8, 21-19 | (Kenya) Matheri Joseph Githitu (Kenya) Lavina Martins |
| June 14 | Victorian International; Melbourne, Australia; International Series $5,000 – 64MS/32WS/32MD/32WD/32XD | (Thailand) Pisit Poodchalat; 21–5,21-5 | (Chinese Taipei) Yu Chun-hsien |
| June 14 | Victorian International; Melbourne, Australia; International Series $5,000 – 64MS/32WS/32MD/32WD/32XD | (Thailand) Ruethaichanok Laisuan; 21-16, 22-20 | (Thailand) Hemrachatanun Mattana |
| June 14 | Victorian International; Melbourne, Australia; International Series $5,000 – 64MS/32WS/32MD/32WD/32XD | (Australia) Robin Middleton (Australia) Ross Smith; 21–19, 19–21, 21-17 | (Australia) Raymond Tam (Australia) Glenn Warfe |
| June 14 | Victorian International; Melbourne, Australia; International Series $5,000 – 64MS/32WS/32MD/32WD/32XD | (Thailand) Ruethaichanok Laisuan (Thailand) Narissapat Lam; 21–15, 21-14 | (Malaysia) Sannatasah Saniru (Australia) Renuga Veeran |
| June 14 | Victorian International; Melbourne, Australia; International Series $5,000 – 64MS/32WS/32MD/32WD/32XD | (Australia) Robin Middleton (Australia) He Tian Tang; 21–19, 19–21, 21-19 | (Australia) Ross Smith (Australia) Renuga Veeran |

=== July ===
| Week of | Tournament | Champions | Runners-up |
|---|---|---|---|
| July 1 | Indonesia International; Surabaya, Indonesia; International Challenge $15,000 – 64MS/32WS/32MD/32WD/32XD | (Indonesia) Jonatan Christie; 21-17, 21-10 | (Indonesia) Alamsyah Yunus |
| July 1 | Indonesia International; Surabaya, Indonesia; International Challenge $15,000 – 64MS/32WS/32MD/32WD/32XD | (Indonesia) Dinar Dyah Ayustine; 13-21, 21–15, 21-12 | (Bulgaria) Stefani Stoeva |
| July 1 | Indonesia International; Surabaya, Indonesia; International Challenge $15,000 – 64MS/32WS/32MD/32WD/32XD | (Indonesia) Praveen Jordan (Indonesia) Didit Juang; 17–21, 21–16, 23–21 | (Indonesia) Hardianto (Indonesia) Agripina Prima Rahmanto Putra |
| July 1 | Indonesia International; Surabaya, Indonesia; International Challenge $15,000 – 64MS/32WS/32MD/32WD/32XD | (Indonesia) Maretha Dea Giovani (Indonesia) Melvira Oklamona; 21–12, 21-18 | (Indonesia) Shella Devi Aulia (Indonesia) Anggia Shitta Awanda |
| July 1 | Indonesia International; Surabaya, Indonesia; International Challenge $15,000 – 64MS/32WS/32MD/32WD/32XD | (Indonesia) Ardiansyah (Indonesia) Devi Tika Permatasari; 19-21, 21–18, 21-19 | (Indonesia) Yodhi Satrio (Indonesia) Ni Ketut Mahadewi Istirani |
| July 1 | White Nights; Gatchina, Russia; International Challenge $15,000 – 64MS/32WS/32MD/32WD/32XD | (Finland) Eetu Heino; 21–14, 17–21, 21-9 | (Finland) Ville Lang |
| July 1 | White Nights; Gatchina, Russia; International Challenge $15,000 – 64MS/32WS/32MD/32WD/32XD | (Germany) Olga Konon; 21–17, 21–14 | (Russia) Ella Diehl |
| July 1 | White Nights; Gatchina, Russia; International Challenge $15,000 – 64MS/32WS/32MD/32WD/32XD | (France) Baptiste Careme (France) Ronan Labar; 21–17, 21–16 | (Russia) Andrej Ashmarin (Russia) Sergey Shumilkin |
| July 1 | White Nights; Gatchina, Russia; International Challenge $15,000 – 64MS/32WS/32MD/32WD/32XD | (Germany) Isabel Herttrich (Germany) Carla Nelte; 22-20, 21-12 | (France) Audrey Fontaine (France) Émilie Lefel |
| July 1 | White Nights; Gatchina, Russia; International Challenge $15,000 – 64MS/32WS/32MD/32WD/32XD | (Germany) Peter Kaesbauer (Germany) Isabel Herttrich; 24-22, 21-15 | (Russia) Sergey Shumilkin (Russia) Viktoriia Vorobeva |
| July 8 | U.S. Open; Orange County, California, United States; Grand Prix Gold $120,000 – 64MS/32WS/32MD/32WD/32XD; Draw | (Vietnam) Nguyen Tien Minh; 18-21, 21–17, 21-18 | (Hong Kong) Wong Wing Ki |
| July 8 | U.S. Open; Orange County, California, United States; Grand Prix Gold $120,000 – 64MS/32WS/32MD/32WD/32XD; Draw | (Thailand) Sapsiree Taerattanachai; 21-12, 21-13 | (Japan) Yuka Kusunose |
| July 8 | U.S. Open; Orange County, California, United States; Grand Prix Gold $120,000 – 64MS/32WS/32MD/32WD/32XD; Draw | (Japan) Takeshi Kamura (Japan) Keigo Sonoda; 21–16, 27–25 | (Chinese Taipei) Liang Jui-wei (Chinese Taipei) Liao Kuan-hao |
| July 8 | U.S. Open; Orange County, California, United States; Grand Prix Gold $120,000 – 64MS/32WS/32MD/32WD/32XD; Draw | (China) Bao Yixin (China) Zhong Qianxin; 21-17, 24-22 | (China) Yu Xiaohan (China) Huang Yaqiong |
| July 8 | U.S. Open; Orange County, California, United States; Grand Prix Gold $120,000 – 64MS/32WS/32MD/32WD/32XD; Draw | (Hong Kong) Lee Chun Hei (Hong Kong) Chau Hoi Wah; 21-8, 21-14 | (China) Wang Yilu (China) Huang Yaqiong |
| July 8 | New Caledonia International; Noumea, New Caledonia; Future Series; 32MS/16WS/16MD/8WD/16XD | (Australia) Wesley Caulkett; 21-13, 21–23, 21-12 | (New Zealand) Luke Charlesworth |
| July 8 | New Caledonia International; Noumea, New Caledonia; Future Series; 32MS/16WS/16MD/8WD/16XD | (New Zealand) Kelly Stern; 9-21, 21–10, 21-13 | (New Caledonia) Magali Bravo |
| July 8 | New Caledonia International; Noumea, New Caledonia; Future Series; 32MS/16WS/16MD/8WD/16XD | (New Zealand) Luke Charlesworth (New Zealand) Asher Richardson; 21-19, 19–21, 21-11 | (Australia) Wesley Caulkett (New Caledonia) Julien Pactat |
| July 8 | New Caledonia International; Noumea, New Caledonia; Future Series; 32MS/16WS/16MD/8WD/16XD | (New Caledonia) Magali Bravo (New Zealand) Kelly Stern; 21-8, 21-10 | (New Caledonia) Natacha Offlaville (New Caledonia) Lorinda Sautes |
| July 8 | New Caledonia International; Noumea, New Caledonia; Future Series; 32MS/16WS/16MD/8WD/16XD | (New Zealand) Asher Richardson (New Caledonia) Magali Bravo; 21-11, 21-16 | (New Caledonia) Thommy Sargito (New Caledonia) Cathy Camerota |
| July 15 | Canada Open; Richmond, British Columbia, Canada; Grand Prix $50,000 – 64MS/32WS/32MD/32WD/32XD; Draw | (Malaysia) Tan Chun Seang; 15-21, 21–11, 21-16 | (Netherlands) Eric Pang |
| July 15 | Canada Open; Richmond, British Columbia, Canada; Grand Prix $50,000 – 64MS/32WS/32MD/32WD/32XD; Draw | (Thailand) Nichaon Jindapon; 21–8, 21-16 | (Hong Kong) Yip Pui Yin |
| July 15 | Canada Open; Richmond, British Columbia, Canada; Grand Prix $50,000 – 64MS/32WS/32MD/32WD/32XD; Draw | (Thailand) Maneepong Jongjit (Thailand) Nipitphon Puangpuapech; 21-12, Disqualified | (Thailand) Bodin Issara (Thailand) Pakkawat Vilailak |
| July 15 | Canada Open; Richmond, British Columbia, Canada; Grand Prix $50,000 – 64MS/32WS/32MD/32WD/32XD; Draw | (China) Yu Xiaohan (China) Huang Yaqiong; 13-21, 21–11, 21-13 | (Netherlands) Eefje Muskens (Netherlands) Selena Piek |
| July 15 | Canada Open; Richmond, British Columbia, Canada; Grand Prix $50,000 – 64MS/32WS/32MD/32WD/32XD; Draw | (Hong Kong) Lee Chun Hei (Hong Kong) Chau Hoi Wah; 21-13, 21-10 | (Netherlands) Jorrit de Ruiter (Netherlands) Samantha Barning |

=== August ===
| Week of | Tournament | Champions | Runners-up |
|---|---|---|---|
| August 5 | World Championships; Guangzhou, China; BWF Major Event; 64MS/64WS/64MD/64WD/64XD; Draw | (China) Lin Dan; 6-21 21-13 20-17 Retired | (Malaysia) Lee Chong Wei |
| August 5 | World Championships; Guangzhou, China; BWF Major Event; 64MS/64WS/64MD/64WD/64XD; Draw | (Thailand) Ratchanok Intanon; 22-20 18-21 21-14 | (China) Li Xuerui |
| August 5 | World Championships; Guangzhou, China; BWF Major Event; 64MS/64WS/64MD/64WD/64XD; Draw | (Indonesia) Mohammad Ahsan (Indonesia) Hendra Setiawan; 21-13 23-21 | (Denmark) Mathias Boe (Denmark) Carsten Mogensen |
| August 5 | World Championships; Guangzhou, China; BWF Major Event; 64MS/64WS/64MD/64WD/64XD; Draw | (China) Wang Xiaoli (China) Yu Yang; 21-14 18-21 21-8 | (South Korea) Eom Hye-won (South Korea) Jang Ye-na |
| August 5 | World Championships; Guangzhou, China; BWF Major Event; 64MS/64WS/64MD/64WD/64XD; Draw | (Indonesia) Tontowi Ahmad (Indonesia) Liliyana Natsir; 21-13 16-21 22-20 | (China) Xu Chen (China) Ma Jin |
| August 12 | African Badminton Championships Team & Individual; Beau-Bassin Rose-Hill, Mauritius; Continental Championships | South Africa; 3–0 | Nigeria |
| August 12 | African Badminton Championships Team & Individual; Beau-Bassin Rose-Hill, Mauritius; Continental Championships | (South Africa) Jacob Maliekal; 21–13, 21–12 | (South Africa) Prakash Vijayanath |
| August 12 | African Badminton Championships Team & Individual; Beau-Bassin Rose-Hill, Mauritius; Continental Championships | (Nigeria) Grace Gabriel; 25-23, 21-12 | (Mauritius) Kate Foo Kune |
| August 12 | African Badminton Championships Team & Individual; Beau-Bassin Rose-Hill, Mauritius; Continental Championships | (South Africa) Andries Malan (South Africa) Willem Viljoen; 21–11, 21–12 | (Nigeria) Enejoh Abah (Nigeria) Victor Makanju |
| August 12 | African Badminton Championships Team & Individual; Beau-Bassin Rose-Hill, Mauritius; Continental Championships | (Seychelles) Juliette Ah-Wan (Seychelles) Allisen Camille; 18-21, 21–16, 21-14 | (Mauritius) Shama Aboobakar (Mauritius) Yeldy Louison |
| August 12 | African Badminton Championships Team & Individual; Beau-Bassin Rose-Hill, Mauritius; Continental Championships | (South Africa) Willem Viljoen (South Africa) Michelle Butler-Emmett; 21-18, 20–22, 21-9 | (South Africa) Andries Malan (South Africa) Jennifer Fry |
| August 12 | Colombia International; Armenia, Colombia; Future Series; 2MS/3WS | (Colombia) Raúl Pineda; 21–18, 21–17 | (Colombia) Stiven Pulgarin |
| August 12 | Colombia International; Armenia, Colombia; Future Series; 2MS/3WS | (Colombia) Lesly Moncayo; 21–15, 21-17 | (Colombia) Luisa Valero |
| August 19 | Bulgaria Eurasia Open; Sofia, Bulgaria; International Series $5,000 – 32MS/32WS/32MD/32WD/32XD | (Poland) Michal Rogalski; 18-21, 21–11, 21-12 | (Slovenia) Iztok Utrosa |
| August 19 | Bulgaria Eurasia Open; Sofia, Bulgaria; International Series $5,000 – 32MS/32WS/32MD/32WD/32XD | (Bulgaria) Stefani Stoeva; 21–16, 21-18 | (Bulgaria) Linda Zetchiri |
| August 19 | Bulgaria Eurasia Open; Sofia, Bulgaria; International Series $5,000 – 32MS/32WS/32MD/32WD/32XD | (Scotland) Martin Campbell (Scotland) Patrick Machugh; 25–13, 21–10 | (Wales) Joe Morgan (Wales) Nic Strange |
| August 19 | Bulgaria Eurasia Open; Sofia, Bulgaria; International Series $5,000 – 32MS/32WS/32MD/32WD/32XD | (Bulgaria) Petya Nedelcheva (Bulgaria) Dimitria Popstoikova; 21–11, 21–8 | (Bulgaria) Gabriela Stoeva (Bulgaria) Stefani Stoeva |
| August 19 | Bulgaria Eurasia Open; Sofia, Bulgaria; International Series $5,000 – 32MS/32WS/32MD/32WD/32XD | (Finland) Anton Kaisti (Bulgaria) Gabriela Stoeva; 19-21, 21–9, 21-18 | (Germany) Marvin Emil Seidel (Germany) Yvonne Li |
| August 19 | Singapore International; Singapore; International Series $5,000 – 64MS/32WS/32MD/32WD/32XD | (Singapore) Zi Liang Derek Wong; 21–18, 21-14 | (Chinese Taipei) Lin Yu-hsien |
| August 19 | Singapore International; Singapore; International Series $5,000 – 64MS/32WS/32MD/32WD/32XD | (Thailand) Rawinda Prajongjai; 21-12, 21-14 | (Thailand) Chochuwong Pornpawee |
| August 19 | Singapore International; Singapore; International Series $5,000 – 64MS/32WS/32MD/32WD/32XD | (Chinese Taipei) Chen Chung-jen (Chinese Taipei) Wang Chi-lin; 21-12,25-27, 21-16 | (Malaysia) Jagdish Singh (Malaysia) Roni Tan Wee Long |
| August 19 | Singapore International; Singapore; International Series $5,000 – 64MS/32WS/32MD/32WD/32XD | (Singapore) Shinta Mulia Sari (Singapore) Yao Lei; 19-21, 21–15, 21-13 | (Singapore) Fu Mingtian (Singapore) Yu Yan Vanessa Neo |
| August 19 | Singapore International; Singapore; International Series $5,000 – 64MS/32WS/32MD/32WD/32XD | (Thailand) Vasin Nilyoke (Thailand) Chaladchalam Chayanit; 21–14, 21–13 | (Chinese Taipei) Wang Chi-lin (Chinese Taipei) Chen Szu-yu |
| August 19 | Mauritius International; Beau-Bassin Rose-Hill, Mauritius; Future Series; 64MS/64WS/64MD/32WD/32XD | (India) P. Vinay Kumar Reddy; 12-21, 21–16, 21-14 | (Nigeria) Jinkan Ifraimu Bulus |
| August 19 | Mauritius International; Beau-Bassin Rose-Hill, Mauritius; Future Series; 64MS/64WS/64MD/32WD/32XD | (Mauritius) Kate Foo Kune; 21-18, 16–21, 24-22 | (Nigeria) Grace Gabriel |
| August 19 | Mauritius International; Beau-Bassin Rose-Hill, Mauritius; Future Series; 64MS/64WS/64MD/32WD/32XD | (South Africa) Andries Malan (South Africa) Willem Viljoen; 21–11, 21–17 | (Mauritius) Denneshsing Baboolall (Mauritius) Julien Paul |
| August 19 | Mauritius International; Beau-Bassin Rose-Hill, Mauritius; Future Series; 64MS/64WS/64MD/32WD/32XD | (South Africa) Elme De Villiers (South Africa) Sandra Le Grange; 21-15, 21–16 | (Nigeria) Dorcas Ajoke Adesokan (Nigeria) Grace Gabriel |
| August 19 | Mauritius International; Beau-Bassin Rose-Hill, Mauritius; Future Series; 64MS/64WS/64MD/32WD/32XD | (South Africa) Willem Viljoen (South Africa) Michelle Butler-Emmett; 21–12, 21–13 | (Seychelles) Georgie Cupidon (Seychelles) Allisen Camille |
| August 19 | Venezuela International; Estado Aragua, Venezuela; International Series $5,000 –32MS/32WS/16MD/16WD/32XD | (Cuba) Osleni Guerrero; 21–14, 21–16 | (Guatemala) Humblers Heymard |
| August 19 | Venezuela International; Estado Aragua, Venezuela; International Series $5,000 –32MS/32WS/16MD/16WD/32XD | (Trinidad and Tobago) Solangel Guzman; 21–14, 21–4 | (Guatemala) Ana Lucia De Leon |
| August 19 | Venezuela International; Estado Aragua, Venezuela; International Series $5,000 –32MS/32WS/16MD/16WD/32XD | (Guatemala) Humblers Heymard (Guatemala) Anibal Marroquin; 21–17, 21–14 | (Cuba) Leodannis Martinez (Cuba) Ernesto Reyes |
| August 19 | Venezuela International; Estado Aragua, Venezuela; International Series $5,000 –32MS/32WS/16MD/16WD/32XD | (Guatemala) Ana Lucia De Leon (Guatemala) Nikté Sotomayor; 24–22, 21–18 | (Dominican Republic) Beronica Vibieca (Dominican Republic) Daigenis Mercedes Saturria |
| August 19 | Venezuela International; Estado Aragua, Venezuela; International Series $5,000 –32MS/32WS/16MD/16WD/32XD | (Guatemala) Humblers Heymard (Guatemala) Nikté Sotomayor; 22-20, 17–21, 21–18 | (Dominican Republic) Nelson Javier (Dominican Republic) Beronica Vibieca |
| August 26 | Slovak Open; Prešov, Slovakia; Future Series; 32MS/32WS/32MD/16WD/32XD | (Ukraine) Vitaly Konov; 21–18, 25-23 | (Poland) Michal Rogalski |
| August 26 | Slovak Open; Prešov, Slovakia; Future Series; 32MS/32WS/32MD/16WD/32XD | (England) Panuga Riou; 21–16, 21–11 | (Netherlands) Kirsten van der Valk |
| August 26 | Slovak Open; Prešov, Slovakia; Future Series; 32MS/32WS/32MD/16WD/32XD | (Russia) Nikita Khakimov (Russia) Vasily Kuznetsov; 21-9, 20–22, 21-18 | (Switzerland) Oliver Schaller (Malaysia) Tan Bin Shen |
| August 26 | Slovak Open; Prešov, Slovakia; Future Series; 32MS/32WS/32MD/16WD/32XD | (Ukraine) Anastasiya Dmytryshyn (Ukraine) Darya Samarchants; 17-21, 22–20, 21-15 | (Czech Republic) Sarka Krizkova (Czech Republic) Katerina Tomalova |
| August 26 | Slovak Open; Prešov, Slovakia; Future Series; 32MS/32WS/32MD/16WD/32XD | (Czech Republic) Jakub Bitman (Czech Republic) Alzbeta Basova; 21–16, 22-20 | (Ukraine) Mykola Dmitrishin (Ukraine) Yelyzaveta Zharka |

=== September ===
| Week of | Tournament | Champions | Runners-up |
|---|---|---|---|
| September 2 | Chinese Taipei Open; Taipei, Chinese Taipei; Grand Prix Gold $200,000 – 64MS/32WS/32MD/32WD/32XD; Draw | (South Korea) Son Wan-ho; 19-21, 21–9, 21-18 | (Vietnam) Nguyễn Tiến Minh |
| September 2 | Chinese Taipei Open; Taipei, Chinese Taipei; Grand Prix Gold $200,000 – 64MS/32WS/32MD/32WD/32XD; Draw | (South Korea) Sung Ji-hyun; 21–16, 21–9 | (Chinese Taipei) Tai Tzu-ying |
| September 2 | Chinese Taipei Open; Taipei, Chinese Taipei; Grand Prix Gold $200,000 – 64MS/32WS/32MD/32WD/32XD; Draw | (South Korea) Kim Gi-jung (South Korea) Kim Sa-rang; 21–11, 21–11 | (Chinese Taipei) Lee Sheng-mu (Chinese Taipei) Tsai Chia-hsin |
| September 2 | Chinese Taipei Open; Taipei, Chinese Taipei; Grand Prix Gold $200,000 – 64MS/32WS/32MD/32WD/32XD; Draw | (South Korea) Jung Kyung-eun (South Korea) Kim Ha-na; Walkover | (South Korea) Lee So-hee (South Korea) Shin Seung-chan |
| September 2 | Chinese Taipei Open; Taipei, Chinese Taipei; Grand Prix Gold $200,000 – 64MS/32WS/32MD/32WD/32XD; Draw | (South Korea) Shin Baek-cheol (South Korea) Jang Ye-na; 22-20, 12–21, 21-16 | (South Korea) Yoo Yeon-seong (South Korea) Eom Hye-won |
| September 2 | Kharkiv International; Kharkiv, Ukraine; International Challenge $15,000 – 32MS/32WS/32MD/32WD/32XD | (Ukraine) Dmytro Zavadsky; 21–14, 21–17 | (Sweden) Mathias Borg |
| September 2 | Kharkiv International; Kharkiv, Ukraine; International Challenge $15,000 – 32MS/32WS/32MD/32WD/32XD | (Indonesia) Febby Angguni; 22-20, 21–14 | (Indonesia) Ana Rovita |
| September 2 | Kharkiv International; Kharkiv, Ukraine; International Challenge $15,000 – 32MS/32WS/32MD/32WD/32XD | (Poland) Adam Cwalina (Poland) Przemysław Wacha; 22–20, 15–21, 21-12 | (Denmark) Anders Skaarup Rasmussen (Denmark) Kim Astrup |
| September 2 | Kharkiv International; Kharkiv, Ukraine; International Challenge $15,000 – 32MS/32WS/32MD/32WD/32XD | (Scotland) Imogen Bankier (Bulgaria) Petya Nedelcheva; 21–11, 21–12 | (Denmark) Lena Grebak (Denmark) Maria Helsbol |
| September 2 | Kharkiv International; Kharkiv, Ukraine; International Challenge $15,000 – 32MS/32WS/32MD/32WD/32XD | (Scotland) Robert Blair (Scotland) Imogen Bankier; 20-22, 21–9, 21-18 | (Denmark) Kim Astrup (Denmark) Maria Helsbol |
| September 2 | Guatemala International; Guatemala City, Guatemala; International Series $5,000 – 32MS/16WS/16MD/8WD/16XD | (Guatemala) Rodolfo Ramirez; 21–10, 25–23 | (Cuba) Osleni Guerrero |
| September 2 | Guatemala International; Guatemala City, Guatemala; International Series $5,000 – 32MS/16WS/16MD/8WD/16XD | (Dominican Republic) Beronica Vibieca; 21–17, 21–15 | (Peru) Daniela Macias |
| September 2 | Guatemala International; Guatemala City, Guatemala; International Series $5,000 – 32MS/16WS/16MD/8WD/16XD | (Guatemala) Solis Jonathan (Guatemala) Rodolfo Ramirez; 21–13, 21–18 | (Dominican Republic) Nelson Javier (Dominican Republic) Alberto Raposo |
| September 2 | Guatemala International; Guatemala City, Guatemala; International Series $5,000 – 32MS/16WS/16MD/8WD/16XD | (Guatemala) Krisley López (Guatemala) Nikté Sotomayor; 21–18, 21-19 | (Dominican Republic) Beronica Vibieca (Dominican Republic) Daigenis Saturria |
| September 2 | Guatemala International; Guatemala City, Guatemala; International Series $5,000 – 32MS/16WS/16MD/8WD/16XD | (Guatemala) Solis Jonathan (Guatemala) Nikté Sotomayor; 21–11, 19–21, 21–19 | (Dominican Republic) Nelson Javier (Dominican Republic) Beronica Vibieca |
| September 9 | China Masters; Changzhou, China; Superseries $250,000 – 32MS/16WS/32MD/32WD/32XD; Draw | (China) Wang Zhengming; 11-21, 21–14, 24-22 | (South Korea) Son Wan-ho |
| September 9 | China Masters; Changzhou, China; Superseries $250,000 – 32MS/16WS/32MD/32WD/32XD; Draw | (China) Liu Xin; 21-4, 13–21, 21-12 | (Thailand) Porntip Buranaprasertsuk |
| September 9 | China Masters; Changzhou, China; Superseries $250,000 – 32MS/16WS/32MD/32WD/32XD; Draw | (South Korea) Ko Sung-hyun (South Korea) Lee Yong-dae; 25-23, 21-19 | (Japan) Hiroyuki Endo (Japan) Kenichi Hayakawa |
| September 9 | China Masters; Changzhou, China; Superseries $250,000 – 32MS/16WS/32MD/32WD/32XD; Draw | (China) Wang Xiaoli (China) Yu Yang; 21–17, 21–16 | (China) Ma Jin (China) Tang Jinhua |
| September 9 | China Masters; Changzhou, China; Superseries $250,000 – 32MS/16WS/32MD/32WD/32XD; Draw | (China) Zhang Nan (China) Zhao Yunlei; 21–18, 21–12 | (South Korea) Yoo Yeon-seong (South Korea) Eom Hye-won |
| September 9 | Belgian International; Leuven, Belgium; International Challenge $15,000 – 32MS/32WS/32MD/32WD/32XD | (Indonesia) Andre Kurniawan Tedjono; 21-17, 21-11 | (Netherlands) Eric Pang |
| September 9 | Belgian International; Leuven, Belgium; International Challenge $15,000 – 32MS/32WS/32MD/32WD/32XD | (Indonesia) Febby Angguni; 22-20, 21-11 | (Chinese Taipei) Cheng Chi-ya |
| September 9 | Belgian International; Leuven, Belgium; International Challenge $15,000 – 32MS/32WS/32MD/32WD/32XD | (Denmark) Anders Skaarup Rasmussen (Denmark) Kim Astrup; 28-26, 21-18 | (England) Chris Langridge (England) Peter Mills |
| September 9 | Belgian International; Leuven, Belgium; International Challenge $15,000 – 32MS/32WS/32MD/32WD/32XD | (Scotland) Imogen Bankier (Bulgaria) Petya Nedelcheva; 13-21, 21–11, 21-18 | (Bulgaria) Gabriela Stoeva (Bulgaria) Stefani Stoeva |
| September 9 | Belgian International; Leuven, Belgium; International Challenge $15,000 – 32MS/32WS/32MD/32WD/32XD | (Denmark) Anders Skaarup Rasmussen (Denmark) Lena Grebak; 21-18, 9-21, 21-15 | (Netherlands) Jacco Arends (Netherlands) Selena Piek |
| September 9 | Carebaco International; San Juan, Puerto Rico; Future Series; 64MS/32WS/16MD/16WD/32XD | (Italy) Rosario Maddaloni; 21-14, 21-12 | (United States) Bjorn Seguin |
| September 9 | Carebaco International; San Juan, Puerto Rico; Future Series; 64MS/32WS/16MD/16WD/32XD | (Guatemala) Nikté Sotomayor; 21–10, 21–16 | (Guatemala) Ana Lucia De Leon |
| September 9 | Carebaco International; San Juan, Puerto Rico; Future Series; 64MS/32WS/16MD/16WD/32XD | (Jamaica) Gareth Henry (United States) Bjorn Seguin; 21–19, 21–17 | (Dominican Republic) Nelson Javier (Dominican Republic) Alberto Raposo |
| September 9 | Carebaco International; San Juan, Puerto Rico; Future Series; 64MS/32WS/16MD/16WD/32XD | (Dominican Republic) Beronica Vibieca (Dominican Republic) Daigenis Saturria; 21-18, 21-12 | (Puerto Rico) Saribel Caceres Ramos (Puerto Rico) Genesis Valentin Suarez |
| September 9 | Carebaco International; San Juan, Puerto Rico; Future Series; 64MS/32WS/16MD/16WD/32XD | (Guatemala) Anibal Marroquin (Guatemala) Krisley López; 21-16, 21-19 | (Jamaica) Gareth Henry (Jamaica) Henry Geordine |
| September 16 | Japan Open; Tokyo, Japan; Super Series $200,000 – 32MS/32WS/32MD/32WD/32XD; Draw | (Malaysia) Lee Chong Wei; 23–21, 21–17 | (Japan) Kenichi Tago |
| September 16 | Japan Open; Tokyo, Japan; Super Series $200,000 – 32MS/32WS/32MD/32WD/32XD; Draw | (Japan) Akane Yamaguchi; 21–15, 21–19 | (Japan) Shizuka Uchida |
| September 16 | Japan Open; Tokyo, Japan; Super Series $200,000 – 32MS/32WS/32MD/32WD/32XD; Draw | (Indonesia) Mohammad Ahsan (Indonesia) Hendra Setiawan; 22–20, 21-16 | (China) Chai Biao (China) Hong Wei |
| September 16 | Japan Open; Tokyo, Japan; Super Series $200,000 – 32MS/32WS/32MD/32WD/32XD; Draw | (China) Ma Jin (China) Tang Jinhua; 21–11, 21–14 | (Denmark) Christinna Pedersen (Denmark) Kamilla Rytter Juhl |
| September 16 | Japan Open; Tokyo, Japan; Super Series $200,000 – 32MS/32WS/32MD/32WD/32XD; Draw | (China) Zhang Nan (China) Zhao Yunlei; Walkover | (China) Xu Chen (China) Ma Jin |
| September 16 | Polish International; Lubin, Poland; International Series $5,000 – 32MS/32WS/32MD/16WD/32XD | (Chinese Taipei) Lin Yu-hsien; 21–19, 21–16 | (Chinese Taipei) Wang Tzu-wei |
| September 16 | Polish International; Lubin, Poland; International Series $5,000 – 32MS/32WS/32MD/16WD/32XD | (Chinese Taipei) Cheng Chi-ya; 21-18, 14–21, 21-17 | (Chinese Taipei) Hsu Ya-ching |
| September 16 | Polish International; Lubin, Poland; International Series $5,000 – 32MS/32WS/32MD/16WD/32XD | (Chinese Taipei) Chen Chung-jen (Chinese Taipei) Wang Chi-lin; 22-24, 21–14, 21-14 | (Indonesia) Christopher Rusdianto (Indonesia) Trikusuma Wardhana |
| September 16 | Polish International; Lubin, Poland; International Series $5,000 – 32MS/32WS/32MD/16WD/32XD | (Chinese Taipei) Lee Chia-hsin (Chinese Taipei) Wu Ti-jung; 21-10, 21-16 | (Chinese Taipei) Chiang Mei-hui (Chinese Taipei) Hsu Ya-ching |
| September 16 | Polish International; Lubin, Poland; International Series $5,000 – 32MS/32WS/32MD/16WD/32XD | (Chinese Taipei) Lin Chia-hsuan (Chinese Taipei) Hsu Ya-ching; 12-21, 21–16, 21-18 | (Chinese Taipei) Lu Ching-yao (Chinese Taipei) Pai Yu-po |
| September 23 | Russian Open; Vladivostok, Russia; Grand Prix $50,000 – 64MS/32WS/16MD/16WD/32XD; Draw | (Russia) Vladimir Ivanov; 21–17, 15–21, 21-14 | (Japan) Kenta Nishimoto |
| September 23 | Russian Open; Vladivostok, Russia; Grand Prix $50,000 – 64MS/32WS/16MD/16WD/32XD; Draw | (Japan) Aya Ohori; 21-5, 21-10 | (Russia) Ksenia Polikarpova |
| September 23 | Russian Open; Vladivostok, Russia; Grand Prix $50,000 – 64MS/32WS/16MD/16WD/32XD; Draw | (Russia) Vladimir Ivanov (Russia) Ivan Sozonov; 21–16, 21–19 | (Russia) Andrej Ashmarin (Russia) Vitalij Durkin |
| September 23 | Russian Open; Vladivostok, Russia; Grand Prix $50,000 – 64MS/32WS/16MD/16WD/32XD; Draw | (Russia) Anastasia Chervaykova (Russia) Nina Vislova; 21–16, 21–18 | (Russia) Irina Khlebko (Russia) Ksenia Polikarpova |
| September 23 | Russian Open; Vladivostok, Russia; Grand Prix $50,000 – 64MS/32WS/16MD/16WD/32XD; Draw | (Russia) Ivan Sozonov (Russia) Tatjana Bibik; 21–17, 24-22 | (Russia) Vitalij Durkin (Russia) Nina Vislova |
| September 23 | Indonesian Masters; Yogyakarta Indonesia; Grand Prix Gold $120,000 – 64MS/32WS/32MD/32WD/32XD; Draw | (Indonesia) Simon Santoso; 21–17, 21–11 | (Indonesia) Dionysius Hayom Rumbaka |
| September 23 | Indonesian Masters; Yogyakarta Indonesia; Grand Prix Gold $120,000 – 64MS/32WS/32MD/32WD/32XD; Draw | (China) Suo Di; 21–12, 22-20 | (China) Yao Xue |
| September 23 | Indonesian Masters; Yogyakarta Indonesia; Grand Prix Gold $120,000 – 64MS/32WS/32MD/32WD/32XD; Draw | (Indonesia) Angga Pratama (Indonesia) Rian Agung Saputro; 17-21, 21–15, 21-16 | (Indonesia) Ronald Alexander (Indonesia) Selvanus Geh |
| September 23 | Indonesian Masters; Yogyakarta Indonesia; Grand Prix Gold $120,000 – 64MS/32WS/32MD/32WD/32XD; Draw | (China) Luo Ying (China) Luo Yu; 19–21, 21–15, 21-18 | (China) Huang Dongping (China) Jia Yifan |
| September 23 | Indonesian Masters; Yogyakarta Indonesia; Grand Prix Gold $120,000 – 64MS/32WS/32MD/32WD/32XD; Draw | (Indonesia) Praveen Jordan (Indonesia) Vita Marissa; 22–20, 9–21, 21-14 | (Indonesia) Tontowi Ahmad (Indonesia) Liliyana Natsir |
| September 23 | Czech International; Brno, Czech Republic; International Challenge $15,000 – 32MS/32WS/32MD/32WD/32XD | (India) Anup Sridhar; 21-11, 21-16 | (Italy) Indra Bagus Ade Chandra |
| September 23 | Czech International; Brno, Czech Republic; International Challenge $15,000 – 32MS/32WS/32MD/32WD/32XD | (Scotland) Kirsty Gilmour; 21-18, 21-10 | (Chinese Taipei) Cheng Chi-ya |
| September 23 | Czech International; Brno, Czech Republic; International Challenge $15,000 – 32MS/32WS/32MD/32WD/32XD | (Poland) Adam Cwalina (Poland) Przemysław Wacha; 20-22, 22–20, 21-12 | (Chinese Taipei) Chen Chung-jen (Chinese Taipei) Wang Chi-lin |
| September 23 | Czech International; Brno, Czech Republic; International Challenge $15,000 – 32MS/32WS/32MD/32WD/32XD | (Scotland) Imogen Bankier (Bulgaria) Petya Nedelcheva; 21-6, 21-14 | (Scotland) Jillie Cooper (Scotland) Kirsty Gilmour |
| September 23 | Czech International; Brno, Czech Republic; International Challenge $15,000 – 32MS/32WS/32MD/32WD/32XD | (Chinese Taipei) Wang Chi-lin (Chinese Taipei) Wu Ti-jung; 21-19, 21-13 | (Czech Republic) Jakub Bitman (Czech Republic) Alzbeta Basova |

=== October ===
| Week of | Tournament | Champions | Runners-up |
|---|---|---|---|
| October 1 | London Grand Prix Gold; London, England; Grand Prix Gold $120,000 – 64MS/32WS/32MD/32WD/32XD; Draw | (China) Tian Houwei; 22–20, 21–16 | (Denmark) Hans-Kristian Vittinghus |
| October 1 | London Grand Prix Gold; London, England; Grand Prix Gold $120,000 – 64MS/32WS/32MD/32WD/32XD; Draw | (Spain) Carolina Marín; 21–19, 21–9 | (Scotland) Kirsty Gilmour |
| October 1 | London Grand Prix Gold; London, England; Grand Prix Gold $120,000 – 64MS/32WS/32MD/32WD/32XD; Draw | (Denmark) Mathias Boe (Denmark) Carsten Mogensen; 21–13, 21–16 | (Indonesia) Berry Angriawan (Indonesia) Ricky Karanda Suwardi |
| October 1 | London Grand Prix Gold; London, England; Grand Prix Gold $120,000 – 64MS/32WS/32MD/32WD/32XD; Draw | (Denmark) Christinna Pedersen (Denmark) Kamilla Rytter Juhl; 12–21, 21–17, 21–15 | (Denmark) Line Damkjær Kruse (Denmark) Marie Røpke |
| October 1 | London Grand Prix Gold; London, England; Grand Prix Gold $120,000 – 64MS/32WS/32MD/32WD/32XD; Draw | (Germany) Michael Fuchs (Germany) Birgit Michels; 21–19, 21–14 | (England) Chris Langridge (England) Heather Olver |
| October 1 | Brazil International; São Paulo, Brazil; International Challenge $15,000 – 32MS/32WS/32MD/16WD/32XD | (Chinese Taipei) Yang Chih-hsun; 8-21, 21–18, 21-18 | (Cuba) Osleni Guerrero |
| October 1 | Brazil International; São Paulo, Brazil; International Challenge $15,000 – 32MS/32WS/32MD/16WD/32XD | (Canada) Michelle Li; 16-21, 21–15, 21-8 | (Brazil) Lohaynny Vicente |
| October 1 | Brazil International; São Paulo, Brazil; International Challenge $15,000 – 32MS/32WS/32MD/16WD/32XD | (United States) Phillip Chew (United States) Sattawat Pongnairat; 12-21, 21–13, 21-15 | (Brazil) Hugo Arthuso (Brazil) Alex Yuwan Tjong |
| October 1 | Brazil International; São Paulo, Brazil; International Challenge $15,000 – 32MS/32WS/32MD/16WD/32XD | (Canada) Nicole Grether (Canada) Charmaine Reid; 21-11, 21-11 | (Brazil) Thalita Correa (Brazil) Mariana Pedrol Freitas |
| October 1 | Brazil International; São Paulo, Brazil; International Challenge $15,000 – 32MS/32WS/32MD/16WD/32XD | (United States) Phillip Chew (United States) Jamie Subandhi; 21-13, 21-19 | (Chinese Taipei) Yang Chih-hsun (Canada) Michelle Li |
| October 1 | Bulgarian International; Sofia, Bulgaria; International Challenge $15,000 – 32MS/32WS/32MD/32WD/32XD | (Denmark) Emil Holst; 21-16, 21-16 | (Chinese Taipei) Wan Chia-hsin |
| October 1 | Bulgarian International; Sofia, Bulgaria; International Challenge $15,000 – 32MS/32WS/32MD/32WD/32XD | (Spain) Beatriz Corrales; 21-19, 21-14 | (Bulgaria) Petya Nedelcheva |
| October 1 | Bulgarian International; Sofia, Bulgaria; International Challenge $15,000 – 32MS/32WS/32MD/32WD/32XD | (Poland) Łukasz Moreń (Poland) Wojciech Szkudlarczyk; 21-16, 13–21, 24-22 | (Poland) Adam Cwalina (Poland) Przemysław Wacha |
| October 1 | Bulgarian International; Sofia, Bulgaria; International Challenge $15,000 – 32MS/32WS/32MD/32WD/32XD | (Bulgaria) Gabriela Stoeva (Bulgaria) Stefani Stoeva; 21-15, 21-10 | (United States) Eva Lee (United States) Paula Lynn Obañana |
| October 1 | Bulgarian International; Sofia, Bulgaria; International Challenge $15,000 – 32MS/32WS/32MD/32WD/32XD | (Scotland) Robert Blair (Scotland) Imogen Bankier; 21-17, 21-15 | (Poland) Robert Mateusiak (Poland) Agnieszka Wojtkowska |
| October 7 | Dutch Open; Almere, Netherlands; Grand Prix $50,000 – 64MS/32WS/32MD/32WD/32XD; Draw | (Hong Kong) Wei Nan; 21–15, 21–18 | (Hong Kong) Chan Yan Kit |
| October 7 | Dutch Open; Almere, Netherlands; Grand Prix $50,000 – 64MS/32WS/32MD/32WD/32XD; Draw | (Thailand) Busanan Ongbamrungphan; 21–12, 21–12 | (Singapore) Gu Juan |
| October 7 | Dutch Open; Almere, Netherlands; Grand Prix $50,000 – 64MS/32WS/32MD/32WD/32XD; Draw | (Indonesia) Wahyu Nayaka (Indonesia) Ade Yusuf; 14–21, 21–18, 21–17 | (Indonesia) Berry Angriawan (Indonesia) Ricky Karanda Suwardi |
| October 7 | Dutch Open; Almere, Netherlands; Grand Prix $50,000 – 64MS/32WS/32MD/32WD/32XD; Draw | (China) Bao Yixin (China) Tang Jinhua; 21–15, 21–7 | (Indonesia) Anggia Shitta Awanda (Indonesia) Della Destiara Haris |
| October 7 | Dutch Open; Almere, Netherlands; Grand Prix $50,000 – 64MS/32WS/32MD/32WD/32XD; Draw | (Singapore) Danny Bawa Chrisnanta (Singapore) Vanessa Neo; 21–19, 25–23 | (Indonesia) Muhammad Rijal (Indonesia) Debby Susanto |
| October 7 | Irish International; Dublin, Ireland; Future Series; 32MS/32WS/32MD/32WD/32XD | (Denmark) Kian Andersen; 21-17, 21-17 | (Finland) Anton Kaisti |
| October 7 | Irish International; Dublin, Ireland; Future Series; 32MS/32WS/32MD/32WD/32XD | (France) Delphine Lansac; 21–16, 21-17 | (Hungary) Laura Sárosi |
| October 7 | Irish International; Dublin, Ireland; Future Series; 32MS/32WS/32MD/32WD/32XD | (Republic of Ireland) Jonathan Dolan (Republic of Ireland) Sam Magee; 21–12, 21–9 | (Slovenia) Kek Jamnik (Slovenia) Alen Roj |
| October 7 | Irish International; Dublin, Ireland; Future Series; 32MS/32WS/32MD/32WD/32XD | (Denmark) Louise Hansen (Denmark) Louise Seiersen; 21-17, 21-14 | (Scotland) Rebekka Findlay (Scotland) Caitlin Pringle |
| October 7 | Irish International; Dublin, Ireland; Future Series; 32MS/32WS/32MD/32WD/32XD | (Finland) Anton Kaisti (Finland) Jenny Nyström; 20-22, 21–17, 21-13 | (France) Jordan Corvée (France) Marie Batomene |
| October 14 | Denmark Open; Odense, Denmark; Super Series Premier $400,000 – 32MS/32WS/32MD/32WD/32XD; Draw | (China) Chen Long; 24-22, 21-19 | (Malaysia) Lee Chong Wei |
| October 14 | Denmark Open; Odense, Denmark; Super Series Premier $400,000 – 32MS/32WS/32MD/32WD/32XD; Draw | (China) Wang Yihan; 16-21, 21–18, 22–20 | (South Korea) Sung Ji-hyun |
| October 14 | Denmark Open; Odense, Denmark; Super Series Premier $400,000 – 32MS/32WS/32MD/32WD/32XD; Draw | (South Korea) Lee Yong-dae (South Korea) Yoo Yeon-seong; 21–19, 21–16 | (Indonesia) Mohammad Ahsan (Indonesia) Hendra Setiawan |
| October 14 | Denmark Open; Odense, Denmark; Super Series Premier $400,000 – 32MS/32WS/32MD/32WD/32XD; Draw | (China) Bao Yixin (China) Tang Jinhua; 21-16, 21-13 | (Denmark) Christinna Pedersen (Denmark) Kamilla Rytter Juhl |
| October 14 | Denmark Open; Odense, Denmark; Super Series Premier $400,000 – 32MS/32WS/32MD/32WD/32XD; Draw | (China) Zhang Nan (China) Zhao Yunlei; 21-11, 22-20 | (Indonesia) Tontowi Ahmad (Indonesia) Liliyana Natsir |
| October 14 | Ethiopia International; Arat Kilo, Ethiopia; Future Series; 16MS/16WS/8MD/8WD/8XD | (Zambia) Chongo Mulenga; 12-21, 21–19, 21-18 | (Egypt) Adham Hatem Elgamal |
| October 14 | Ethiopia International; Arat Kilo, Ethiopia; Future Series; 16MS/16WS/8MD/8WD/8XD | (Egypt) Doha Hany; 21-9, 22-20 | (Ethiopia) Yerusksew Legssey Tura |
| October 14 | Ethiopia International; Arat Kilo, Ethiopia; Future Series; 16MS/16WS/8MD/8WD/8XD | (Egypt) Huessin Abdelrahman (Egypt) Adham Hatem Elgamal; 21-17, 24-22 | (Ethiopia) Mekonen Gebrelu (Ethiopia) Asrar Seid |
| October 14 | Ethiopia International; Arat Kilo, Ethiopia; Future Series; 16MS/16WS/8MD/8WD/8XD | (Ethiopia) Getachew Firehiwot (Ethiopia) Yerusksew Legssey Tura; 21-15, 21-19 | (Egypt) Doha Hany (Egypt) Naja Mohamed |
| October 14 | Ethiopia International; Arat Kilo, Ethiopia; Future Series; 16MS/16WS/8MD/8WD/8XD | (Egypt) Huessin Abdelrahman (Egypt) Doha Hany; 21-14, 21-11 | (Egypt) Adham Hatem Elgamal (Egypt) Naja Mohamed |
| October 14 | Swiss International; Yverdon-les-Bains, Switzerland; International Challenge $15,000 – 32MS/32WS/32MD/32WD/32XD | (France) Brice Leverdez; 22-20, 21-14 | (Russia) Vladimir Malkov |
| October 14 | Swiss International; Yverdon-les-Bains, Switzerland; International Challenge $15,000 – 32MS/32WS/32MD/32WD/32XD | (United States) Beiwen Zhang; 21-12, 21-12 | (India) Tanvi Lad |
| October 14 | Swiss International; Yverdon-les-Bains, Switzerland; International Challenge $15,000 – 32MS/32WS/32MD/32WD/32XD | (Germany) Daniel Benz (Malaysia) Chan Kwong Beng; 21-16, 21-16 | (France) Lucas Corvée (France) Brice Leverdez |
| October 14 | Swiss International; Yverdon-les-Bains, Switzerland; International Challenge $15,000 – 32MS/32WS/32MD/32WD/32XD | (Russia) Anastasia Chervaykova (Russia) Nina Vislova; 21-18, 18–21, 21-13 | (Sweden) Emelie Lennartsson (Sweden) Emma Wengberg |
| October 14 | Swiss International; Yverdon-les-Bains, Switzerland; International Challenge $15,000 – 32MS/32WS/32MD/32WD/32XD | (Russia) Vitalij Durkin (Russia) Nina Vislova; 21-14, 17–21, 21-18 | (France) Ronan Labar (France) Émilie Lefel |
| October 21 | Pan Am Badminton Championships; Santo Domingo, Dominican Republic; Continental Championships; 8 teams/64MS/32WS/32MD/16WD/32XD | Canada; 3–1 | United States |
| October 21 | Pan Am Badminton Championships; Santo Domingo, Dominican Republic; Continental Championships; 8 teams/64MS/32WS/32MD/16WD/32XD | (Cuba) Osleni Guerrero; 17-21, 21–6, 21-16 | (United States) Sattawat Pongnairat |
| October 21 | Pan Am Badminton Championships; Santo Domingo, Dominican Republic; Continental Championships; 8 teams/64MS/32WS/32MD/16WD/32XD | (Canada) Michelle Li; 21-8, 21-6 | (United States) Jamie Subandhi |
| October 21 | Pan Am Badminton Championships; Santo Domingo, Dominican Republic; Continental Championships; 8 teams/64MS/32WS/32MD/16WD/32XD | (Canada) Adrian Liu (Canada) Derrick Ng; 17-21, 21–6, 21-16 | (Canada) Kevin Li (Canada) Nyl Yakura |
| October 21 | Pan Am Badminton Championships; Santo Domingo, Dominican Republic; Continental Championships; 8 teams/64MS/32WS/32MD/16WD/32XD | (United States) Eva Lee (United States) Paula Lynn Obañana; 21-15, 21-13 | (Canada) Alex Bruce (Canada) Phyllis Chan |
| October 21 | Pan Am Badminton Championships; Santo Domingo, Dominican Republic; Continental Championships; 8 teams/64MS/32WS/32MD/16WD/32XD | (Canada) Toby Ng (Canada) Alex Bruce; 21-12, 23-21 | (United States) Howard Shu (United States) Eva Lee |
| October 21 | French Open; Paris, France; Super Series $200,000 – 32MS/32WS/32MD/32WD/32XD; Draw | (Denmark) Jan Ø. Jørgensen; 21-19, 23-21 | (Japan) Kenichi Tago |
| October 21 | French Open; Paris, France; Super Series $200,000 – 32MS/32WS/32MD/32WD/32XD; Draw | (China) Wang Shixian; 21-18, 21-18 | (Thailand) Porntip Buranaprasertsuk |
| October 21 | French Open; Paris, France; Super Series $200,000 – 32MS/32WS/32MD/32WD/32XD; Draw | (Indonesia) Marcus Fernaldi Gideon (Indonesia) Markis Kido; 21-16, 21-18 | (Malaysia) Koo Kien Keat (Malaysia) Tan Boon Heong |
| October 21 | French Open; Paris, France; Super Series $200,000 – 32MS/32WS/32MD/32WD/32XD; Draw | (China) Bao Yixin (China) Tang Jinhua; 21-13, 21-17 | (China) Tian Qing (China) Zhao Yunlei |
| October 21 | French Open; Paris, France; Super Series $200,000 – 32MS/32WS/32MD/32WD/32XD; Draw | (China) Zhang Nan (China) Zhao Yunlei; 28-26, 21-18 | (China) Xu Chen (China) Ma Jin |
| October 21 | Hatzor International; Hatzor, Israel; International Series $5,000; 32MS/16WS/16MD/8WD/8XD | (Russia) Vladimir Malkov; 17-21, 24–22, 21-10 | (Israel) Misha Zilberman |
| October 21 | Hatzor International; Hatzor, Israel; International Series $5,000; 32MS/16WS/16MD/8WD/8XD | (Portugal) Telma Santos; 21-16, 21-19 | (Russia) Olga Golovanova |
| October 21 | Hatzor International; Hatzor, Israel; International Series $5,000; 32MS/16WS/16MD/8WD/8XD | (Russia) Vladimir Malkov (Russia) Vadim Novoselov; 21-18, 19–21, 27-25 | (Wales) Joe Morgan (Wales) Nic Strange |
| October 21 | Hatzor International; Hatzor, Israel; International Series $5,000; 32MS/16WS/16MD/8WD/8XD | (Russia) Olga Golovanova (Russia) Viktoriia Vorobeva; 21-19, 21-7 | (Croatia) Maja Pavlinić (Croatia) Dorotea Sutara |
| October 21 | Hatzor International; Hatzor, Israel; International Series $5,000; 32MS/16WS/16MD/8WD/8XD | (Russia) Vladimir Malkov (Russia) Viktoriia Vorobeva; 21-19, 21-7 | (Czech Republic) Jan Fröhlich (Russia) Katerina Zvereva |
| October 21 | World Junior Championships; Bangkok, Thailand; BWF Major Event; 128MS/128WS/64MD/64WD/128XD; Draw | (South Korea) Heo Kwang-hee; 21-11, 21-12 | (Chinese Taipei) Wang Tzu-wei |
| October 21 | World Junior Championships; Bangkok, Thailand; BWF Major Event; 128MS/128WS/64MD/64WD/128XD; Draw | (Japan) Akane Yamaguchi; 21-11, 21-13 | (Japan) Aya Ohori |
| October 21 | World Junior Championships; Bangkok, Thailand; BWF Major Event; 128MS/128WS/64MD/64WD/128XD; Draw | (China) Li Junhui (China) Liu Yuchen; 14-21, 21–13, 22-20 | (China) Huang Kaixiang (China) Zheng Siwei |
| October 21 | World Junior Championships; Bangkok, Thailand; BWF Major Event; 128MS/128WS/64MD/64WD/128XD; Draw | (South Korea) Chae Yoo-jung (South Korea) Kim Ji-won; 21-19, 21-15 | (China) He Jiaxin (China) Chen Qingchen |
| October 21 | World Junior Championships; Bangkok, Thailand; BWF Major Event; 128MS/128WS/64MD/64WD/128XD; Draw | (China) Huang Kaixiang (China) Chen Qingchen; 21-18, 20–22, 23-21 | (Indonesia) Kevin Sanjaya Sukamuljo (Indonesia) Masita Mahmudin |
| October 21 | Nigeria International; Abuja, Nigeria; International Series $5,000 – 32MS/16WS/16MD/8WD/16XD | (Nigeria) Jinkan Ifraimu; 21-17, 21-18 | (Nigeria) Enejoh Abah |
| October 21 | Nigeria International; Abuja, Nigeria; International Series $5,000 – 32MS/16WS/16MD/8WD/16XD | (Nigeria) Fatima Azeez; 21-16, 15–21, 22-20 | (Nigeria) Tosin Damilola Atolagbe |
| October 21 | Nigeria International; Abuja, Nigeria; International Series $5,000 – 32MS/16WS/16MD/8WD/16XD | (Nigeria) Jinkan Ifraimu (Nigeria) Ola Fagbemi; 22-20, 21-19 | (Nigeria) Enejoh Abahe (Nigeria) Victor Makanju |
| October 21 | Nigeria International; Abuja, Nigeria; International Series $5,000 – 32MS/16WS/16MD/8WD/16XD | (Nigeria) Augustina Ebhomien Sunday (Nigeria) Uchechukwu Deborah Ukeh; 21-18, 21-13 | (Nigeria) Tosin Damilola Atolagbe (Nigeria) Fatima Azeez |
| October 21 | Nigeria International; Abuja, Nigeria; International Series $5,000 – 32MS/16WS/16MD/8WD/16XD | (Nigeria) Ola Fagbemi (Nigeria) Dorcas Ajoke Adesokan; 21-12, 21-17 | (Nigeria) Enejoh Abah (Nigeria) Tosin Damilola Atolagbe |
| October 28 | Santo Domingo Open; Santo Domingo, Dominican Republic; Future Series; 32MS/32WS/16MD/16WD/32XD | (Cuba) Osleni Guerrero; 21–16, 21-6 | (United States) Howard Shu |
| October 28 | Santo Domingo Open; Santo Domingo, Dominican Republic; Future Series; 32MS/32WS/16MD/16WD/32XD | (United States) Iris Wang; 21–18, 21-6 | (Brazil) Lohaynny Vicente |
| October 28 | Santo Domingo Open; Santo Domingo, Dominican Republic; Future Series; 32MS/32WS/16MD/16WD/32XD | (Jamaica) Gareth Henry (Jamaica) Samuel Ricketts; 19-21, 21–16, 21-15 | (Brazil) Hugo Arthuso (Brazil) Alex Yuwan Tjong |
| October 28 | Santo Domingo Open; Santo Domingo, Dominican Republic; Future Series; 32MS/32WS/16MD/16WD/32XD | (Brazil) Paula Pereira (Brazil) Lohaynny Vicente; 21-14, 21-9 | (Brazil) Ana Paula Campos (Brazil) Yasmin Cury |
| October 28 | Santo Domingo Open; Santo Domingo, Dominican Republic; Future Series; 32MS/32WS/16MD/16WD/32XD | (Brazil) Alex Yuwan Tjong (Brazil) Lohaynny Vicente; 21-9, 21-13 | (Brazil) Hugo Arthuso (Brazil) Fabiana Silva |
| October 28 | Bitburger Open; Saarbrücken, Germany; Grand Prix Gold $120,000 – 64MS/32WS/32MD/32WD/32XD; Draw | (Chinese Taipei) Chou Tien-chen; 13–21, 21–18, 21–15 | (Germany) Marc Zwiebler |
| October 28 | Bitburger Open; Saarbrücken, Germany; Grand Prix Gold $120,000 – 64MS/32WS/32MD/32WD/32XD; Draw | (Thailand) Nitchaon Jindapol; 21–13, 21–13 | (Bulgaria) Linda Zetchiri |
| October 28 | Bitburger Open; Saarbrücken, Germany; Grand Prix Gold $120,000 – 64MS/32WS/32MD/32WD/32XD; Draw | (Denmark) Mads Conrad-Petersen (Denmark) Mads Pieler Kolding; 21–11, 21–16 | (Denmark) Kim Astrup (Denmark) Anders Skaarup Rasmussen |
| October 28 | Bitburger Open; Saarbrücken, Germany; Grand Prix Gold $120,000 – 64MS/32WS/32MD/32WD/32XD; Draw | (Netherlands) Eefje Muskens (Netherlands) Selena Piek; 22–20, 21–15 | (Malaysia) Ng Hui Ern (Malaysia) Ng Hui Lin |
| October 28 | Bitburger Open; Saarbrücken, Germany; Grand Prix Gold $120,000 – 64MS/32WS/32MD/32WD/32XD; Draw | (Germany) Michael Fuchs (Germany) Birgit Michels; 21–19, 21–15 | (England) Chris Adcock (England) Gabrielle White |
| October 28 | Bahrain International; Manama, Bahrain; International Series $5,000 – 64MS/32WS/16MD/16WD/32XD | (India) Sameer Verma; 21-11, 18–21, 21-13 | (Sri Lanka) Dinuka Karunaratna |
| October 28 | Bahrain International; Manama, Bahrain; International Series $5,000 – 64MS/32WS/16MD/16WD/32XD | (India) Saili Rane; 14-21, 21–19, 21-17 | (Malaysia) Sannatasah Saniru |
| October 28 | Bahrain International; Manama, Bahrain; International Series $5,000 – 64MS/32WS/16MD/16WD/32XD | (India) K. Nandagopal (India) V. Diju; 21-17, 12–21, 21-19 | (India) K. T. Rupesh Kumar (India) Sanave Thomas |
| October 28 | Bahrain International; Manama, Bahrain; International Series $5,000 – 64MS/32WS/16MD/16WD/32XD | (India) Prajakta Sawant (India) Arathi Sara Sunil; 18-21, 21–18, 21-16 | (India) Aparna Balan (India) Sanyogita Ghorpade |
| October 28 | Bahrain International; Manama, Bahrain; International Series $5,000 – 64MS/32WS/16MD/16WD/32XD | (India) Arun Vishnu (India) Aparna Balan; 21-14, 25-23 | (India) V. Diju (India) N. Siki Reddy |
| October 28 | Hungarian International; Budaörs, Budapest, Hungary; International Series $5,000 – 32MS/32WS/32MD/32WD/32XD | (Spain) Ernesto Velázquez; 21-14, 21-17 | (Estonia) Raul Must |
| October 28 | Hungarian International; Budaörs, Budapest, Hungary; International Series $5,000 – 32MS/32WS/32MD/32WD/32XD | (Russia) Olga Golovanova; 21-15, 18–21, 21-15 | (Netherlands) Soraya de Visch Eijbergen |
| October 28 | Hungarian International; Budaörs, Budapest, Hungary; International Series $5,000 – 32MS/32WS/32MD/32WD/32XD | (Indonesia) Albert Saputra (Indonesia) Indra Viki Okvana; 21-16, 23-21 | (Denmark) Frederik Colberg (Denmark) Mikkel Mikkelsen |
| October 28 | Hungarian International; Budaörs, Budapest, Hungary; International Series $5,000 – 32MS/32WS/32MD/32WD/32XD | (Russia) Olga Golovanova (Russia) Viktoriia Vorobeva; 21-17, 19–21, 21-11 | (Denmark) Celine Juel (Denmark) Josephine van Zaane |
| October 28 | Hungarian International; Budaörs, Budapest, Hungary; International Series $5,000 – 32MS/32WS/32MD/32WD/32XD | (Netherlands) Robin Tabeling (Netherlands) Myke Halkema; 21-17, 21-17 | (Indonesia) Indra Viki Okvana (Indonesia) Megawati Gustiani |

=== November ===
| Week of | Tournament | Champions | Runners-up |
|---|---|---|---|
| November 4 | Bahrain International Challenge; Manama, Bahrain; International Challenge $15,000 – 64MS/32WS/32MD/16WD/32XD | (India) Sameer Verma; 19-21, 21–14, 21-12 | (India) Subhankar Dey |
| November 4 | Bahrain International Challenge; Manama, Bahrain; International Challenge $15,000 – 64MS/32WS/32MD/16WD/32XD | (India) Tanvi Lad; 21-12, 21-18 | (India) Saili Rane |
| November 4 | Bahrain International Challenge; Manama, Bahrain; International Challenge $15,000 – 64MS/32WS/32MD/16WD/32XD | (India) K. T. Rupesh Kumar (India) Sanave Thomas; Walkover | (India) K. Nandagopal (India) V. Diju |
| November 4 | Bahrain International Challenge; Manama, Bahrain; International Challenge $15,000 – 64MS/32WS/32MD/16WD/32XD | (India) Pradnya Gadre (India) N. Sikki Reddy; 21-13, 19–21, 21-5 | (India) Aparna Balan (India) Sanyogita Ghorpade |
| November 4 | Bahrain International Challenge; Manama, Bahrain; International Challenge $15,000 – 64MS/32WS/32MD/16WD/32XD | (India) Sanave Thomas (India) Prajakta Sawant; 19-21, 21–14, 23-23 Retired | (India) V. Diju (India) N. Sikki Reddy |
| November 4 | Korea Masters; Jeonju, South Korea; Grand Prix Gold $120,000 – 64MS/32WS/32MD/32WD/32XD; Draw | (South Korea) Lee Hyun-il; 21–18, 21-12 | (South Korea) Hong Ji-hoon |
| November 4 | Korea Masters; Jeonju, South Korea; Grand Prix Gold $120,000 – 64MS/32WS/32MD/32WD/32XD; Draw | (South Korea) Bae Yeon-ju; 21-19, 15–21, 21-9 | (South Korea) Sung Ji-hyun |
| November 4 | Korea Masters; Jeonju, South Korea; Grand Prix Gold $120,000 – 64MS/32WS/32MD/32WD/32XD; Draw | (South Korea) Kim Gi-jung (South Korea) Kim Sa-rang; 21-15, 18–21, 25-23 | (South Korea) Ko Sung-hyun (South Korea) Shin Baek-cheol |
| November 4 | Korea Masters; Jeonju, South Korea; Grand Prix Gold $120,000 – 64MS/32WS/32MD/32WD/32XD; Draw | (South Korea) Jang Ye-na (South Korea) Kim So-young; 21-15, 21-12 | (South Korea) Go Ah-ra (South Korea) Yoo Hae-won |
| November 4 | Korea Masters; Jeonju, South Korea; Grand Prix Gold $120,000 – 64MS/32WS/32MD/32WD/32XD; Draw | (South Korea) Yoo Yeon-seong (South Korea) Jang Ye-na; 21-13, 21-11 | (South Korea) Kang Ji-wook (South Korea) Choi Hye-in |
| November 4 | USA International; Orlando, Florida, United States; International Challenge $15,000 – 64MS/32WS/32MD/16WD/32XD | (United States) Hock Lai Lee; 21-19, 21-14 | (Japan) Tatsuya Watanabe |
| November 4 | USA International; Orlando, Florida, United States; International Challenge $15,000 – 64MS/32WS/32MD/16WD/32XD | (United States) Beiwen Zhang; 21-10, 21-12 | (United States) Iris Wang |
| November 4 | USA International; Orlando, Florida, United States; International Challenge $15,000 – 64MS/32WS/32MD/16WD/32XD | (United States) Christian Yahya Christianto (United States) Hock Lai Lee; 21-9, 21-14 | (Canada) Andrew D'Souza (Canada) Sergiy Shatenko |
| November 4 | USA International; Orlando, Florida, United States; International Challenge $15,000 – 64MS/32WS/32MD/16WD/32XD | (United States) Hong Jingyu (United States) Beiwen Zhang; 21-7, 21-14 | (Brazil) Paula Pereira (Brazil) Lohaynny Vicente |
| November 4 | USA International; Orlando, Florida, United States; International Challenge $15,000 – 64MS/32WS/32MD/16WD/32XD | (Canada) Toby Ng (Canada) Michelle Li; 21-16, 21-15 | (United States) Halim Haryanto Ho (United States) Hong Jingyu |
| November 4 | Morocco International; Casablanca, Morocco; International Series $5,000 – 32MS/16WS/8MD/4WD/8XD | (Netherlands) Vincent de Vries; 21-11, 21-18 | (India) Kirtesh Dhindhwal |
| November 4 | Morocco International; Casablanca, Morocco; International Series $5,000 – 32MS/16WS/8MD/4WD/8XD | (Portugal) Telma Santos; 21-12, 21-10 | (Netherlands) Gayle Mahulette |
| November 4 | Morocco International; Casablanca, Morocco; International Series $5,000 – 32MS/16WS/8MD/4WD/8XD | (India) Vineeth Manuel (India) Arjun Reddy Pochana; 21-12, 21-17 | (Egypt) Abdelrahman Abdelhakim (Egypt) Adham Hatem Elgamal |
| November 4 | Morocco International; Casablanca, Morocco; International Series $5,000 – 32MS/16WS/8MD/4WD/8XD | (Egypt) Doha Hany (Egypt) Naja Mohamed; 21-14, 21-13 | (Morocco) Harag Nazik (Morocco) Rajae Rochdy |
| November 4 | Morocco International; Casablanca, Morocco; International Series $5,000 – 32MS/16WS/8MD/4WD/8XD | (Netherlands) Vincent de Vries (Netherlands) Gayle Mahulette; 21-10, 21-7 | (Egypt) Adham Hatem Elgamal (Egypt) Naja Mohamed |
| November 11 | Malaysia International; Kuching, Sarawak, Malaysia; International Challenge $15,000 – 64MS/32WS/32MD/32WD/32XD | (Malaysia) Mohamad Arif Abdul Latif; 21-12, 21-13 | (Indonesia) Ivanudin Rifan Fauzin |
| November 11 | Malaysia International; Kuching, Sarawak, Malaysia; International Challenge $15,000 – 64MS/32WS/32MD/32WD/32XD | (Chinese Taipei) Hsu Ya-ching; 21-6, 21-13 | (Chinese Taipei) Pai Yu-po |
| November 11 | Malaysia International; Kuching, Sarawak, Malaysia; International Challenge $15,000 – 64MS/32WS/32MD/32WD/32XD | (Indonesia) Selvanus Geh (Indonesia) Alfian Eko Prasetya; 21-15, 21-13 | (Malaysia) Chooi Kah Ming (Malaysia) Teo Ee Yi |
| November 11 | Malaysia International; Kuching, Sarawak, Malaysia; International Challenge $15,000 – 64MS/32WS/32MD/32WD/32XD | (Japan) Kugo Asumi (Japan) Yui Miyauchi; 21-17, 21-14 | (Malaysia) Amelia Alicia Anscelly (Malaysia) Soong Fie Cho |
| November 11 | Malaysia International; Kuching, Sarawak, Malaysia; International Challenge $15,000 – 64MS/32WS/32MD/32WD/32XD | (Indonesia) Alfian Eko Prasetya (Indonesia) Shendy Puspa Irawati; 21-15, 21-16 | (Chinese Taipei) Wang Chi-lin (Chinese Taipei) Wu Ti-jung |
| November 11 | China Open; Shanghai, China; Super Series Premier $450,000 – 32MS/32WS/32MD/32WD/32XD; Draw | (China) Chen Long; 19–21, 21–8, 21–14 | (China) Wang Zhengming |
| November 11 | China Open; Shanghai, China; Super Series Premier $450,000 – 32MS/32WS/32MD/32WD/32XD; Draw | (China) Li Xuerui; 16–21, 21–17, 21–19 | (China) Wang Shixian |
| November 11 | China Open; Shanghai, China; Super Series Premier $450,000 – 32MS/32WS/32MD/32WD/32XD; Draw | (South Korea) Lee Yong-dae (South Korea) Yoo Yeon-seong; 21–13, 21–12 | (Malaysia) Hoon Thien How (Malaysia) Tan Wee Kiong |
| November 11 | China Open; Shanghai, China; Super Series Premier $450,000 – 32MS/32WS/32MD/32WD/32XD; Draw | (China) Wang Xiaoli (China) Yu Yang; 21–13, 21–7 | (China) Bao Yixin (China) Zhong Qianxin |
| November 11 | China Open; Shanghai, China; Super Series Premier $450,000 – 32MS/32WS/32MD/32WD/32XD; Draw | (Indonesia) Tontowi Ahmad (Indonesia) Liliyana Natsir; 21–10, 5–21, 21–17 | (Denmark) Joachim Fischer Nielsen (Denmark) Christinna Pedersen |
| November 11 | Suriname International; Paramaribo, Suriname; International Series $5,000 – 32MS/16WS/16MD/16WD/16XD | (Cuba) Osleni Guerrero; 21-11, 21-18 | (Czech Republic) Jan Fröhlich |
| November 11 | Suriname International; Paramaribo, Suriname; International Series $5,000 – 32MS/16WS/16MD/16WD/16XD | (Trinidad and Tobago) Solángel Guzmán; 21-19, 20–22, 21-19 | (Mexico) Haramara Gaitán |
| November 11 | Suriname International; Paramaribo, Suriname; International Series $5,000 – 32MS/16WS/16MD/16WD/16XD | (Netherlands) Dave Khodabux (Netherlands) Joris van Soerland; 21-14, 21-18 | (Italy) Giovanni Greco (Italy) Rosario Maddaloni |
| November 11 | Suriname International; Paramaribo, Suriname; International Series $5,000 – 32MS/16WS/16MD/16WD/16XD | (Suriname) Crystal Leefmans (Suriname) Priscila Tjitrodipo; 23-21, 21-16 | (Trinidad and Tobago) Virginia Chariandy (Trinidad and Tobago) Solángel Guzmán |
| November 11 | Suriname International; Paramaribo, Suriname; International Series $5,000 – 32MS/16WS/16MD/16WD/16XD | (Netherlands) Dave Khodabux (Netherlands) Elisa Piek; 21-17, 18–21, 21-19 | (Suriname) Mitchel Wongsodikromo (Suriname) Crystal Leefmans |
| November 11 | Norwegian International; Sandefjord, Norway; International Series $5,000 – 32MS/32WS/32MD/16WD/16XD | (Finland) Kasper Lehikoinen; 21-17, 21-16 | (Netherlands) Mark Caljouw |
| November 11 | Norwegian International; Sandefjord, Norway; International Series $5,000 – 32MS/32WS/32MD/16WD/16XD | (Denmark) Mia Blichfeldt; 19-21, 21–16, 21-16 | (Russia) Olga Golovanova |
| November 11 | Norwegian International; Sandefjord, Norway; International Series $5,000 – 32MS/32WS/32MD/16WD/16XD | (Russia) Nikita Khakimov (Russia) Vasily Kuznetsov; 23-21,21-15 | (Denmark) Alexander Bond (Denmark) Mathias Weber Estrup |
| November 11 | Norwegian International; Sandefjord, Norway; International Series $5,000 – 32MS/32WS/32MD/16WD/16XD | (Denmark) Julie Finne-Ipsen (Denmark) Rikke Søby Hansen; 21-14, 24-22 | (Russia) Olga Golovanova (Russia) Viktoriia Vorobeva |
| November 11 | Norwegian International; Sandefjord, Norway; International Series $5,000 – 32MS/32WS/32MD/16WD/16XD | (Russia) Vasily Kuznetsov (Russia) Viktoriia Vorobeva; 21-19, 21-7 | (Denmark) Alexander Bond (Denmark) Rikke Søby Hansen |
| November 18 | Hong Kong Open; Kowloon, Hong Kong; Super Series $350,000 – 32MS/32WS/32MD/32WD/32XD; Draw | (Malaysia) Lee Chong Wei; 21–13, 21–19 | (Indonesia) Sony Dwi Kuncoro |
| November 18 | Hong Kong Open; Kowloon, Hong Kong; Super Series $350,000 – 32MS/32WS/32MD/32WD/32XD; Draw | (China) Wang Yihan; 21–13, 16–21, 21–15 | (China) Wang Shixian |
| November 18 | Hong Kong Open; Kowloon, Hong Kong; Super Series $350,000 – 32MS/32WS/32MD/32WD/32XD; Draw | (South Korea) Lee Yong-dae (South Korea) Yoo Yeon-seong; 12–21, 21–15, 21–18 | (South Korea) Kim Gi-jung (South Korea) Kim Sa-rang |
| November 18 | Hong Kong Open; Kowloon, Hong Kong; Super Series $350,000 – 32MS/32WS/32MD/32WD/32XD; Draw | (China) Bao Yixin (China) Tang Jinhua; 18–21, 21–16, 21–15 | (China) Ou Dongni (China) Tang Yuanting |
| November 18 | Hong Kong Open; Kowloon, Hong Kong; Super Series $350,000 – 32MS/32WS/32MD/32WD/32XD; Draw | (England) Chris Adcock (England) Gabrielle White; 21–14, 24–22 | (China) Liu Cheng (China) Bao Yixin |
| November 18 | Scottish Open; Glasgow, Scotland; Grand Prix $50,000 – 64MS/32WS/32MD/32WD/32XD; Draw | (France) Brice Leverdez; 21–8, 16–21, 21–16 | (Sweden) Henri Hurskainen |
| November 18 | Scottish Open; Glasgow, Scotland; Grand Prix $50,000 – 64MS/32WS/32MD/32WD/32XD; Draw | (Spain) Carolina Marín; 21–14, 11–21, 21–13 | (Scotland) Kirsty Gilmour |
| November 18 | Scottish Open; Glasgow, Scotland; Grand Prix $50,000 – 64MS/32WS/32MD/32WD/32XD; Draw | (Denmark) Mads Conrad-Petersen (Denmark) Mads Pieler Kolding; Walkover | (Denmark) Kim Astrup (Denmark) Anders Skaarup Rasmussen |
| November 18 | Scottish Open; Glasgow, Scotland; Grand Prix $50,000 – 64MS/32WS/32MD/32WD/32XD; Draw | (Netherlands) Eefje Muskens (Netherlands) Selena Piek; 25–23, 15–21, 21–16 | (Malaysia) Ng Hui Ern (Malaysia) Ng Hui Lin |
| November 18 | Scottish Open; Glasgow, Scotland; Grand Prix $50,000 – 64MS/32WS/32MD/32WD/32XD; Draw | (Scotland) Robert Blair (Scotland) Imogen Bankier; 21–16, 21–14 | (England) Chris Langridge (England) Heather Olver |
| November 18 | Internacional Mexicano; Guadalajara, Mexico; International Series $5,000 – 32MS/32WS/16MD/8WD/16XD | (Cuba) Osleni Guerrero; 21-16, 21-17 | (Brazil) Daniel Paiola |
| November 18 | Internacional Mexicano; Guadalajara, Mexico; International Series $5,000 – 32MS/32WS/16MD/8WD/16XD | (Brazil) Lohaynny Vicente; 18-21, 21–17, 21-12 | (Brazil) Fabiana Silva |
| November 18 | Internacional Mexicano; Guadalajara, Mexico; International Series $5,000 – 32MS/32WS/16MD/8WD/16XD | (New Zealand) Kevin Dennerly-Minturn (New Zealand) Oliver Leydon-Davis; 17-21, 21–12,21-6 | (Mexico) Job Castillo (Mexico) Antonio Ocegueda |
| November 18 | Internacional Mexicano; Guadalajara, Mexico; International Series $5,000 – 32MS/32WS/16MD/8WD/16XD | (Brazil) Paula Pereira (Brazil) Lohaynny Vicente; 21-18, 17–21, 21-11 | (Mexico) Cynthia González (Mexico) Victoria Montero |
| November 18 | Internacional Mexicano; Guadalajara, Mexico; International Series $5,000 – 32MS/32WS/16MD/8WD/16XD | (Brazil) Daniel Paiola (Brazil) Paula Pereira; 13-21, 21–13, 21-19 | (Brazil) Hugo Arthuso (Brazil) Fabiana Silva |
| November 25 | Macau Open; Macau; Grand Prix Gold $120,000 – 64MS/32WS/32MD/32WD/32XD; Draw | (South Korea) Son Wan-ho; 21-11, 21-15 | (Chinese Taipei) Hsueh Hsuan-yi |
| November 25 | Macau Open; Macau; Grand Prix Gold $120,000 – 64MS/32WS/32MD/32WD/32XD; Draw | (India) P. V. Sindhu; 21-15, 21-12 | (Canada) Michelle Li |
| November 25 | Macau Open; Macau; Grand Prix Gold $120,000 – 64MS/32WS/32MD/32WD/32XD; Draw | (Malaysia) Hoon Thien How (Malaysia) Tan Wee Kiong; 21-16, 21-19 | (Chinese Taipei) Lee Sheng-mu (Chinese Taipei) Tsai Chia-hsin |
| November 25 | Macau Open; Macau; Grand Prix Gold $120,000 – 64MS/32WS/32MD/32WD/32XD; Draw | (China) Bao Yixin (China) Tang Jinhua; 21-17, 21-15 | (China) Huang Yaqiong (China) Yu Xiaohan |
| November 25 | Macau Open; Macau; Grand Prix Gold $120,000 – 64MS/32WS/32MD/32WD/32XD; Draw | (China) Lu Kai (China) Huang Yaqiong; 17-21, 21–18, 21-17 | (South Korea) Choi Sol-gyu (South Korea) Chae Yoo-jung |
| November 25 | Welsh International; Cardiff, Wales; International Challenge $15,000 – 32MS/32WS/32MD/32WD/32XD | (Spain) Pablo Abián; 21-12, 21-13 | (Denmark) Flemming Quach |
| November 25 | Welsh International; Cardiff, Wales; International Challenge $15,000 – 32MS/32WS/32MD/32WD/32XD | (United States) Beiwen Zhang; 21-12, 21-15 | (Spain) Beatriz Corrales |
| November 25 | Welsh International; Cardiff, Wales; International Challenge $15,000 – 32MS/32WS/32MD/32WD/32XD | (England) Christopher Coles (England) Matthew Nottingham; 21-17, 21-15 | (Australia) Robin Middleton (Australia) Ross Smith |
| November 25 | Welsh International; Cardiff, Wales; International Challenge $15,000 – 32MS/32WS/32MD/32WD/32XD | (Australia) He Tian Tang (Australia) Renuga Veeran; 21-15, 21-12 | (Indonesia) Keshya Nurvita Hanadia (Indonesia) Devi Tika Permatasari |
| November 25 | Welsh International; Cardiff, Wales; International Challenge $15,000 – 32MS/32WS/32MD/32WD/32XD | (England) Chris Langridge (England) Heather Olver; 21-17, 10–21, 21-13 | (Russia) Vitalij Durkin (Russia) Nina Vislova |

=== December ===
| Week of | Tournament | Champions | Runners-up |
|---|---|---|---|
| December 2 | Vietnam Open; Ho Chi Minh City, Vietnam; Grand Prix $50,000 – 64MS/32WS/32MD/32WD/32XD; Draw | (South Korea) Son Wan-ho; 21-14, 21-9 | (Malaysia) Tan Chun Seang |
| December 2 | Vietnam Open; Ho Chi Minh City, Vietnam; Grand Prix $50,000 – 64MS/32WS/32MD/32WD/32XD; Draw | (China) He Bingjiao; 21-10, 21-6 | (Indonesia) Hera Desi |
| December 2 | Vietnam Open; Ho Chi Minh City, Vietnam; Grand Prix $50,000 – 64MS/32WS/32MD/32WD/32XD; Draw | (Indonesia) Fran Kurniawan (Indonesia) Bona Septano; 18-21, 21–18, 21-18 | (Chinese Taipei) Lin Chia-yu (Chinese Taipei) Wu Hsiao-lin |
| December 2 | Vietnam Open; Ho Chi Minh City, Vietnam; Grand Prix $50,000 – 64MS/32WS/32MD/32WD/32XD; Draw | (South Korea) Go A-ra (South Korea) Yoo Hae-won; 12-21, 21–10, 21-9 | (Malaysia) Amelia Alicia Anscelly (Malaysia) Soong Fie Cho |
| December 2 | Vietnam Open; Ho Chi Minh City, Vietnam; Grand Prix $50,000 – 64MS/32WS/32MD/32WD/32XD; Draw | (South Korea) Choi Sol-gyu (South Korea) Chae Yoo-jung; 22-20, 19–21, 21-14 | (Chinese Taipei) Liao Min-chun (Chinese Taipei) Chen Hsiao-huan |
| December 2 | Bangladesh International; Dhaka, Bangladesh; International Challenge $15,000 – 64MS/32WS/32MD/8WD/16XD | (Malaysia) Yogendran Khrishnan; 23-21, 21-14 | (Chinese Taipei) Hsu Jen-hao |
| December 2 | Bangladesh International; Dhaka, Bangladesh; International Challenge $15,000 – 64MS/32WS/32MD/8WD/16XD | (Chinese Taipei) Pai Hsiao-ma; 21-10, 21-13 | (India) Saili Rane |
| December 2 | Bangladesh International; Dhaka, Bangladesh; International Challenge $15,000 – 64MS/32WS/32MD/8WD/16XD | (Chinese Taipei) Liang Jui-wei (Chinese Taipei) Liao Kuan-hao; 21-13, 21-14 | (Chinese Taipei) Hung Ying-yuan (Chinese Taipei) Su Cheng-heng |
| December 2 | Bangladesh International; Dhaka, Bangladesh; International Challenge $15,000 – 64MS/32WS/32MD/8WD/16XD | (India) Prajakta Sawant (India) Arathi Sara Sunil; 22-20, 15-4 Retired | (India) Dhanya Nair (India) Mohita Sahdev |
| December 2 | Bangladesh International; Dhaka, Bangladesh; International Challenge $15,000 – 64MS/32WS/32MD/8WD/16XD | (Malaysia) Muhammad Adib Haiqal Nurizwan (Malaysia) Sannatasah Saniru; 21-10, 21-11 | (India) Abhishek Ahlawat (India) Sanskriti Chhabra |
| December 2 | Irish Open; Dublin, Ireland; International Challenge $15,000 – 32MS/32WS/32MD/32WD/32XD | (Malaysia) Misbun Ramdan Misbun; 21-13, 21-18 | (Germany) Dieter Domke |
| December 2 | Irish Open; Dublin, Ireland; International Challenge $15,000 – 32MS/32WS/32MD/32WD/32XD | (United States) Beiwen Zhang; 21-9, 17–21, 21-10 | (Spain) Beatriz Corrales |
| December 2 | Irish Open; Dublin, Ireland; International Challenge $15,000 – 32MS/32WS/32MD/32WD/32XD | (Poland) Adam Cwalina (Poland) Przemysław Wacha; 21-9, 21-6 | (Netherlands) Jacco Arends (Netherlands) Jelle Maas |
| December 2 | Irish Open; Dublin, Ireland; International Challenge $15,000 – 32MS/32WS/32MD/32WD/32XD | (Netherlands) Eefje Muskens (Netherlands) Selena Piek; 21-17, 21-10 | (Malaysia) Ng Hui Ern (Malaysia) Ng Hui Lin |
| December 2 | Irish Open; Dublin, Ireland; International Challenge $15,000 – 32MS/32WS/32MD/32WD/32XD | (Netherlands) Jacco Arends (Netherlands) Selena Piek; 9-21, 21–19, 21-13 | (Scotland) Robert Blair (Scotland) Imogen Bankier |
| December 2 | Puerto Rico International; San Juan, Puerto Rico; International Challenge $15,000 – 32MS/8WS/8MD/2WD/16XD | (France) Brice Leverdez; 21-17, 21-14 | (Brazil) Daniel Paiola |
| December 2 | Puerto Rico International; San Juan, Puerto Rico; International Challenge $15,000 – 32MS/8WS/8MD/2WD/16XD | (Brazil) Lohaynny Vicente; 19-21, 21–13, 21-18 | (Poland) Aleksandra Wałaszek |
| December 2 | Puerto Rico International; San Juan, Puerto Rico; International Challenge $15,000 – 32MS/8WS/8MD/2WD/16XD | (France) Lucas Corvée (France) Brice Leverdez; 21-14, 21-12 | (France) Laurent Constantin (France) Matthieu Lo Ying Ping |
| December 2 | Puerto Rico International; San Juan, Puerto Rico; International Challenge $15,000 – 32MS/8WS/8MD/2WD/16XD | (Brazil) Paula Pereira (Brazil) Lohaynny Vicente; 21-10, 21-12 | (Brazil) Ana Paula Campos (Brazil) Yasmin Cury |
| December 2 | Puerto Rico International; San Juan, Puerto Rico; International Challenge $15,000 – 32MS/8WS/8MD/2WD/16XD | (Poland) Robert Mateusiak (Poland) Agnieszka Wojtkowska; 21-13, 21-8 | (France) Laurent Constantin (France) Laura Choinet |
| December 2 | Botswana International; Lobatse, Botswana; International Series $5,000 – 32MS/32WS/32MD/16WD/16XD | (South Africa) Jacob Maliekal; 22-20, 21-15 | (Slovenia) Alen Roj |
| December 2 | Botswana International; Lobatse, Botswana; International Series $5,000 – 32MS/32WS/32MD/16WD/16XD | (Portugal) Telma Santos; 21-4,21-11 | (South Africa) Elme de Villiers |
| December 2 | Botswana International; Lobatse, Botswana; International Series $5,000 – 32MS/32WS/32MD/16WD/16XD | (Slovenia) Alen Roj (Slovenia) Kek Jamnik; 14-21,21-15,21-14 | (South Africa) Andries Malan (Serbia) Jovica Rujević |
| December 2 | Botswana International; Lobatse, Botswana; International Series $5,000 – 32MS/32WS/32MD/16WD/16XD | (South Africa) Elme de Villiers (Serbia) Sandra Halilović; 21-13, 21-16 | (Nigeria) Grace Gabriel (Mauritius) Yeldie Louison |
| December 2 | Botswana International; Lobatse, Botswana; International Series $5,000 – 32MS/32WS/32MD/16WD/16XD | (Egypt) Abdelrahman Kashkal (Egypt) Hadia Hosny; 15-21, 21–14, 21-17 | (Mauritius) Sahir Edoo (Mauritius) Yeldie Louison |
| December 9 | Italian International; Rome, Italy; International Challenge $15,000 – 32MS/32WS/32MD/32WD/32XD | (Italy) Indra Bagus Ade Chandra; 19-21, 21–15, 21-12 | (Indonesia) Andre Kurniawan Tedjono |
| December 9 | Italian International; Rome, Italy; International Challenge $15,000 – 32MS/32WS/32MD/32WD/32XD | (Spain) Carolina Marín; 21-15, 21-14 | (Switzerland) Sabrina Jaquet |
| December 9 | Italian International; Rome, Italy; International Challenge $15,000 – 32MS/32WS/32MD/32WD/32XD | (Poland) Adam Cwalina (Poland) Przemysław Wacha; 23-21, 21-17 | (Poland) Łukasz Moreń (Poland) Wojciech Szkudlarczyk |
| December 9 | Italian International; Rome, Italy; International Challenge $15,000 – 32MS/32WS/32MD/32WD/32XD | (Netherlands) Eefje Muskens (Netherlands) Selena Piek; 21-10, 21-8 | (Australia) He Tian Tang (Australia) Renuga Veeran |
| December 9 | Italian International; Rome, Italy; International Challenge $15,000 – 32MS/32WS/32MD/32WD/32XD | (Croatia) Zvonimir Đurkinjak (United States) Eva Lee; 23-21, 21-18 | (Netherlands) Jacco Arends (Netherlands) Selena Piek |
| December 9 | India International; Mumbai, India; International Challenge $15,000 – 32MS/32WS/16MD/16WD/16XD | (India) Sourabh Varma; 21-12, 21-17 | (India) H.S. Prannoy |
| December 9 | India International; Mumbai, India; International Challenge $15,000 – 32MS/32WS/16MD/16WD/16XD | (Indonesia) Febby Angguni; 20-22, 21–14, 21-19 | (Indonesia) Ana Rovita |
| December 9 | India International; Mumbai, India; International Challenge $15,000 – 32MS/32WS/16MD/16WD/16XD | (India) Manu Attri (India) B. Sumeeth Reddy; 21-16, 21-13 | (Chinese Taipei) Tien Tzu-chieh (Chinese Taipei) Wang Chi-lin |
| December 9 | India International; Mumbai, India; International Challenge $15,000 – 32MS/32WS/16MD/16WD/16XD | (India) Pradnya Gadre (India) N. Sikki Reddy; 21-19, 21-19 | (India) Jwala Gutta (India) Ashwini Ponnappa |
| December 9 | India International; Mumbai, India; International Challenge $15,000 – 32MS/32WS/16MD/16WD/16XD | (India) Akshay Dewalkar (India) Pradnya Gadre; 21-17, 18–21, 21-18 | (India) Tarun Kona (India) Ashwini Ponnappa |
| December 9 | Masters Finals; Kuala Lumpur, Malaysia; BWF Super Series Finals $500,000 – 8MS (RR)/8WS (RR)/8MD (RR)/8WD (RR)/8XD (RR); Draw | (Malaysia) Lee Chong Wei; 21-10, 21-12 | (Indonesia) Tommy Sugiarto |
| December 9 | Masters Finals; Kuala Lumpur, Malaysia; BWF Super Series Finals $500,000 – 8MS (RR)/8WS (RR)/8MD (RR)/8WD (RR)/8XD (RR); Draw | (China) Li Xuerui; 21-8, 21-14 | (Chinese Taipei) Tai Tzu-ying |
| December 9 | Masters Finals; Kuala Lumpur, Malaysia; BWF Super Series Finals $500,000 – 8MS (RR)/8WS (RR)/8MD (RR)/8WD (RR)/8XD (RR); Draw | (Indonesia) Mohammad Ahsan (Indonesia) Hendra Setiawan; 21-14, 21-16 | (South Korea) Kim Gi-jung (South Korea) Kim Sa-rang |
| December 9 | Masters Finals; Kuala Lumpur, Malaysia; BWF Super Series Finals $500,000 – 8MS (RR)/8WS (RR)/8MD (RR)/8WD (RR)/8XD (RR); Draw | (Denmark) Christinna Pedersen (Denmark) Kamilla Rytter Juhl; 21-19, 21-12 | (China) Ma Jin (China) Tang Jinhua |
| December 9 | Masters Finals; Kuala Lumpur, Malaysia; BWF Super Series Finals $500,000 – 8MS (RR)/8WS (RR)/8MD (RR)/8WD (RR)/8XD (RR); Draw | (Denmark) Joachim Fischer Nielsen (Denmark) Christinna Pedersen; 12-21, 21–19, 21-10 | (China) Zhang Nan (China) Zhao Yunlei |
| December 9 | South Africa International; Pretoria, South Africa; Future Series; 32MS/32WS/16MD/16WD/16XD | (South Africa) Jacob Maliekal; 20-22, 21–15, 21-10 | (Slovenia) Alen Roj |
| December 9 | South Africa International; Pretoria, South Africa; Future Series; 32MS/32WS/16MD/16WD/16XD | (Portugal) Telma Santos; 21-6, 2-10 | (Egypt) Hadia Hosny |
| December 9 | South Africa International; Pretoria, South Africa; Future Series; 32MS/32WS/16MD/16WD/16XD | (Mauritius) Aatish Lubah (Mauritius) Julien Paul; 22-20, 20–22, 22-20 | (Slovenia) Alen Roj (Slovenia) Kek Jamnik |
| December 9 | South Africa International; Pretoria, South Africa; Future Series; 32MS/32WS/16MD/16WD/16XD | (South Africa) Elme de Villiers (Serbia) Sandra Halilović; 21-14, 21-13 | (South Africa) Michelle Butler-Emmett (South Africa) Sandra le Grange |
| December 9 | South Africa International; Pretoria, South Africa; Future Series; 32MS/32WS/16MD/16WD/16XD | (Egypt) Abdelrahman Kashkal (Egypt) Hadia Hosny; 21-12, 21-19 | (Mauritius) Sahir Edoo (Mauritius) Yeldie Louison |
| December 16 | Turkey International; Istanbul, Turkey; International Series $5,000 – 32MS/32WS/32MD/32WD/32XD | (Belgium) Yuhan Tan; 21-11, 21-12 | (Slovenia) Iztok Utroša |
| December 16 | Turkey International; Istanbul, Turkey; International Series $5,000 – 32MS/32WS/32MD/32WD/32XD | (Bulgaria) Stefani Stoeva; 14-21, 21–16, 21-19 | (Turkey) Neslihan Yiğit |
| December 16 | Turkey International; Istanbul, Turkey; International Series $5,000 – 32MS/32WS/32MD/32WD/32XD | (Russia) Nikita Khakimov (Russia) Vasily Kuznetsov; 22-20, 21-19 | (Russia) Gordey Kosenko (Russia) Aleksandr Nikolaenko |
| December 16 | Turkey International; Istanbul, Turkey; International Series $5,000 – 32MS/32WS/32MD/32WD/32XD | (Bulgaria) Gabriela Stoeva (Bulgaria) Stefani Stoeva; 21-15, 21-8 | (Turkey) Özge Bayrak (Turkey) Neslihan Yiğit |
| December 16 | Turkey International; Istanbul, Turkey; International Series $5,000 – 32MS/32WS/32MD/32WD/32XD | (Finland) Anton Kaisti (Bulgaria) Gabriela Stoeva; 21-9, 21-15 | (Russia) Vasily Kuznetsov (Russia) Viktoriia Vorobeva |
| December 23 | Copenhagen Masters; Frederiksberg, Copenhagen Denmark; Others (Invitation); 4MS/4MD/4XD | (Denmark) Viktor Axelsen; 21-13, 21-16 | (South Korea) Lee Hyun-il |
| December 23 | Copenhagen Masters; Frederiksberg, Copenhagen Denmark; Others (Invitation); 4MS/4MD/4XD | (Denmark) Mathias Boe (Denmark) Carsten Mogensen; 21-18, 21-14 | (Denmark) Mads Conrad-Petersen (Denmark) Mads Pieler Kolding |
| December 23 | Copenhagen Masters; Frederiksberg, Copenhagen Denmark; Others (Invitation); 4MS/4MD/4XD | (Denmark) Joachim Fischer Nielsen (Denmark) Christinna Pedersen; 21-18, 19–21, 21-18 | (Denmark) Mads Pieler Kolding (Denmark) Kamilla Rytter Juhl |
