= 2016 European Badminton Championships =

Tournament details
- Dates: 26 April–1 May 2016
- Venue: Vendéspace
- Location: La Roche-sur-Yon, France

Champions
- Men's singles: (Denmark) Viktor Axelsen
- Women's singles: (Spain) Carolina Marín
- Men's doubles: (Denmark) Mads Conrad-Petersen (Denmark) Mads Pieler Kolding
- Women's doubles: (Denmark) Christinna Pedersen (Denmark) Kamilla Rytter Juhl
- Mixed doubles: (Denmark) Joachim Fischer Nielsen (Denmark) Christinna Pedersen

The 2016 European Badminton Championships were the 25th tournament of the European Badminton Championships. They were held in La Roche-sur-Yon, France, from 26 April–1 May 2016. The competitions were held in the Vendéspace.

== Medalists ==
Event	Gold	Silver	Bronze
Men's singles	Viktor Axelsen (DEN)	Jan Ø. Jørgensen (DEN)	Rajiv Ouseph (ENG)
Men's singles	Viktor Axelsen (DEN)	Jan Ø. Jørgensen (DEN)	Marc Zwiebler (GER)
Women's singles	Carolina Marín (ESP)	Kirsty Gilmour (SCO)	Line Kjaersfeldt (DEN)
Women's singles	Carolina Marín (ESP)	Kirsty Gilmour (SCO)	Anna Thea Madsen (DEN)
Men's doubles	Mads Conrad-Petersen (DEN); Mads Pieler Kolding (DEN)	Kim Astrup (DEN); Anders Skaarup Rasmussen (DEN)	Vladimir Ivanov (RUS); Ivan Sozonov (RUS)
Men's doubles	Mads Conrad-Petersen (DEN); Mads Pieler Kolding (DEN)	Kim Astrup (DEN); Anders Skaarup Rasmussen (DEN)	Marcus Ellis (ENG); Chris Langridge (ENG)
Women's doubles	Christinna Pedersen (DEN); Kamilla Rytter Juhl (DEN)	Eefje Muskens (NED); Selena Piek (NED)	Samantha Barning (NED); Iris Tabeling (NED)
Women's doubles	Christinna Pedersen (DEN); Kamilla Rytter Juhl (DEN)	Eefje Muskens (NED); Selena Piek (NED)	Maiken Fruergaard (DEN); Sara Thygesen (DEN)
Mixed doubles	Joachim Fischer Nielsen (DEN); Christinna Pedersen (DEN)	Niclas Nohr (DEN); Sara Thygesen (DEN)	Mathias Christiansen (DEN); Lena Grebak (DEN)
Mixed doubles	Joachim Fischer Nielsen (DEN); Christinna Pedersen (DEN)	Niclas Nohr (DEN); Sara Thygesen (DEN)	Jacco Arends (NED); Selena Piek (NED)

=== Medal table ===
Rank	Nation	Gold	Silver	Bronze	Total
1	Denmark	4	3	4	11
2	Spain	1	0	0	1
3	Netherlands	0	1	2	3
4	Scotland	0	1	0	1
5	England	0	0	2	2
6	Germany	0	0	1	1
6	Russia	0	0	1	1
Totals (7 entries)		5	5	10	20

== Men's singles ==
=== Seeds ===
1. (Denmark) Jan Ø. Jørgensen (final)
2. (Denmark) Viktor Axelsen (champion)
3. (Germany) Marc Zwiebler (semifinals)
4. (Denmark) Hans-Kristian Vittinghus (quarterfinals)
5. (England) Rajiv Ouseph (semifinals)
6. (France) Brice Leverdez (quarterfinals)
7. (Spain) Pablo Abian (quarterfinals)
8. (Estonia) Raul Must (second round)

=== Section 1 ===
First round
(Bulgaria) B Kisyov	21	21
(Latvia) N Podosinoviks	11	13
(Finland) V Lång	13	6
(Republic of Ireland) S Evans	21	21
(Germany) D Domke
(Iceland) K Gunnarsson	w	/	o
(Israel) M Zilberman	21	21
(Italy) R Maddaloni	11	15

Second round
1	(Denmark) J Ø Jørgensen	21	21
(Bulgaria) B Kisyov	8	14
(Netherlands) N Fransman	21	21
(Republic of Ireland) S Evans	16	13
6	(France) B Leverdez	21	21
(Iceland) K Gunnarsson	7	12
(Austria) L Wraber	14	16
(Israel) M Zilberman	21	21

Third round
1	(Denmark) J Ø Jørgensen	21	21
(Netherlands) N Fransman	10	12
6	(France) B Leverdez	21	21
(Israel) M Zilberman	12	11

Quarterfinals
1	(Denmark) J Ø Jørgensen	21	21
6	(France) B Leverdez	18	11

=== Section 2 ===
First round
(Czech Republic) M Ludík	21	21	15
(Switzerland) M Bonny	9	23	21
(Belgium) M Moreels	16	18
(Sweden) H Hurskainen	21	21
(Ukraine) D Zavadsky	21	21
(Azerbaijan) O Qalandarov	11	6
(Russia) V Malkov	16	21	21
(Poland) M Rogalski	21	12	16

Second round
4	(Denmark) H-K Vittinghus	21	21
(Switzerland) M Bonny	16	9
(Wales) D Font	15	6
(Sweden) H Hurskainen	21	21
5	(England) R Ouseph	21	21
(Ukraine) D Zavadsky	7	9
(France) L Corvée	21	21
(Russia) V Malkov	17	16

Third round
4	(Denmark) H-K Vittinghus	21	22
(Sweden) H Hurskainen	13	20
5	(England) R Ouseph	23	21
(France) L Corvée	21	15

Quarterfinals
4	(Denmark) H-K Vittinghus	21	12	19
5	(England) R Ouseph	19	21	21

=== Section 3 ===
First round
(Denmark) E Holst	9	19
(Belgium) Y Tan	21	21
(Austria) D Obernosterer	8	18
(Czech Republic) P Koukal	21	21
(Slovenia) I Utroša	21	22
(Lithuania) K Navickas	17	20
(Sweden) M Borg	19	21	21
(Finland) E Heino	21	10	13

Second round
(Belgium) Y Tan	21	21
(Hungary) G Krausz	19	19
(Czech Republic) P Koukal	13	21	21
8	(Estonia) R Must	21	18	16
(Slovenia) I Utroša	21	17	20
(Croatia) Z Đurkinjak	17	21	22
(Sweden) M Borg	8	17
3	(Germany) M Zwiebler	21	21

Third round
(Belgium) Y Tan	21	21
(Czech Republic) P Koukal	18	15
(Croatia) Z Đurkinjak	21	12	14
3	(Germany) M Zwiebler	19	21	21

Quarterfinals
(Belgium) Y Tan	11	15
3	(Germany) M Zwiebler	21	21

=== Section 4 ===
First round
(Slovakia) J Vícen	18	15
(Scotland) K Merrilees	21	21
(England) T Penty	21	21
(Ukraine) A Pochtarov	10	14
(Poland) A Dziolko	22	21
(Portugal) P Martins	20	14
(Netherlands) E Meijs	18	16
WC	(France) L Claerbout	21	21

Second round
(Scotland) K Merrilees	20	21	21
(Norway) M Myhre	22	10	14
(England) T Penty	21	21	11
7	(Spain) P Abián	23	18	21
(Poland) A Dziolko	12	21	21
(France) T Rouxel	21	17	18
WC	(France) L Claerbout	21	21	20
2	(Denmark) V Axelsen	23	16	22

Third round
(Scotland) K Merrilees	15	15
7	(Spain) P Abián	21	21
(Poland) A Dziolko	14	14
2	(Denmark) V Axelsen	21	21

Quarterfinals
7	(Spain) P Abián	11	21	13
2	(Denmark) V Axelsen	21	16	21

=== Finals ===
Quarterfinals
1	(Denmark) Jan Ø. Jørgensen	21	21
6	(France) Brice Leverdez	18	11
4	(Denmark) Hans-Kristian Vittinghus	21	12	19
5	(England) Rajiv Ouseph	19	21	21
(Belgium) Yuhan Tan	11	15
3	(Germany) Marc Zwiebler	21	21
7	(Spain) Pablo Abián	11	21	13
2	(Denmark) Viktor Axelsen	21	16	21

Semifinals
1	(Denmark) Jan Ø. Jørgensen	21	21
5	(England) Rajiv Ouseph	11	16
3	(Germany) Marc Zwiebler	10	21
2	(Denmark) Viktor Axelsen	21	23

Final
1	(Denmark) Jan Ø. Jørgensen	11	16
2	(Denmark) Viktor Axelsen	21	21

== Women's singles ==
=== Seeds ===
1. (Spain) Carolina Marín (champion)
2. (Scotland) Kirsty Gilmour (final)
3. (Denmark) Line Kjaersfeldt (semifinals)
4. (Germany) Karin Schnaase (quarterfinals)
5. (Germany) Olga Konon (second round)
6. (Spain) Beatriz Corrales (quarterfinals)
7. (Czech Republic) Kristína Gavnholt (third round)
8. (Bulgaria) Linda Zetchiri (quarterfinals)

=== Section 1 ===
First round
(Slovakia) J Ciznarova	9	7
(Belarus) A Zaitsava	21	21
(Russia) K Polikarpova	16	9
(Estonia) K Tolmoff	21	21
(Italy) J Cicognini	10	15
(Finland) N Vainio	21	21

Second round
1	(Spain) C Marín	21	20	21
(Lithuania) A Stapušaitytė	14	22	9
(Slovenia) K Stankovic	13	17
(Belarus) A Zaitsava	21	21
5	(Germany) O Konon	21	11	17
(Estonia) K Tolmoff	16	21	21
(Greece) I Tenta	6	13
(Finland) N Vainio	21	21

Third round
1	(Spain) C Marín	21	21
(Belarus) A Zaitsava	6	12
(Estonia) K Tolmoff	21	15	19
(Finland) N Vainio	13	21	21

Quarterfinals
1	(Spain) C Marín	21	21
(Finland) N Vainio	11	7

=== Section 2 ===
First round
(France) D Lansac	6
(Czech Republic) Z Pavelkova	1^{r}
(England) C Birch	19	21	12
(Republic of Ireland) C Magee	21	18	21
(Switzerland) S Jaquet	21	21
(Wales) C Turner	11	11
(Ukraine) M Ulitina	21	21
(Norway) V Espeseth	7	16

Second round
3	(Denmark) L Kjaersfeldt	26	22	21
(France) D Lansac	28	20	8
(Portugal) T Santos	8	9
(Republic of Ireland) C Magee	21	21
8	(Bulgaria) L Zetchiri	21	21
(Switzerland) S Jaquet	16	15
(Turkey) O Bayrak	11	21	21
(Ukraine) M Ulitina	21	18	16

Third round
3	(Denmark) L Kjaersfeldt	21	21
(Republic of Ireland) C Magee	11	7
8	(Bulgaria) L Zetchiri	21	15	21
(Turkey) O Bayrak	16	21	14

Quarterfinals
3	(Denmark) L Kjaersfeldt	21	21
8	(Bulgaria) L Zetchiri	10	10

=== Section 3 ===
First round
(Denmark) A T Madsen	21	21
(Iceland) S Hognadottir	9	9
WC	(France) Y Hoyaux	26	21
(Austria) E Baldauf	24	14
(Belgium) L Tan	17	11
(Denmark) N K Rohde	21	21
(Hungary) L Sarosi	21	21
(Croatia) D Sutara	8	5

Second round
(Denmark) A T Madsen	21	14	21
(Finland) A Mikkela	13	21	15
WC	(France) Y Hoyaux	10	11
7	(Czech Republic) K Gavnholt	21	21
(Denmark) N K Rohde	21	13	12
(England) F M Chapman	15	21	21
(Hungary) L Sarosi	21	14	18
4	(Germany) K Schnaase	16	21	21

Third round
(Denmark) A T Madsen	21	21
7	(Czech Republic) K Gavnholt	14	12
(England) F M Chapman	18	21	12
4	(Germany) K Schnaase	21	19	21

Quarterfinals
(Denmark) A T Madsen	21	21
4	(Germany) K Schnaase	19	19

=== Section 4 ===
First round
(Latvia) K Sefere	18	21	21
(Armenia) L Poghosyan	21	13	13
(Israel) D Kugel	10	5
(Bulgaria) P Nedelcheva	21	21
(Russia) N Perminova	21	21
(Poland) A Narel	16	11

Second round
(Latvia) K Sefere	21	21
(Malta) F M Sadowski	10	4
(Bulgaria) P Nedelcheva	21	13	11
6	(Spain) B Corrales	10	21	21
(Russia) N Perminova	21	21
(Netherlands) G Mahulette	16	12
(Turkey) N Yigit	9	11
2	(Scotland) K Gilmour	21	21

Third round
(Latvia) K Sefere	19	12
6	(Spain) B Corrales	21	21
(Russia) N Perminova	14	21	10
2	(Scotland) K Gilmour	21	13	21

Quarterfinals
6	(Spain) B Corrales	19	20
2	(Scotland) K Gilmour	21	22

=== Finals ===
Quarterfinals
1	(Spain) Carolina Marín	21	21
(Finland) Nanna Vainio	11	7
3	(Denmark) Line Kjaersfeldt	21	21
8	(Bulgaria) Linda Zetchiri	10	10
(Denmark) Anna Thea Madsen	21	21
4	(Germany) Karin Schnaase	19	19
6	(Spain) Beatriz Corrales	19	20
2	(Scotland) Kirsty Gilmour	21	22

Semifinals
1	(Spain) Carolina Marín	23	21
3	(Denmark) Line Kjaersfeldt	21	15
(Denmark) Anna Thea Madsen	21	18	19
2	(Scotland) Kirsty Gilmour	17	21	21

Final
1	(Spain) Carolina Marín	21	21
2	(Scotland) Kirsty Gilmour	12	18

== Men's doubles ==
=== Seeds ===
1. (Russia) Vladimir Ivanov / Ivan Sozonov (semifinals)
2. (Denmark) Mads Conrad-Petersen / Mads Pieler Kolding (champion)
3. (England) Marcus Ellis / Chris Langridge (semifinals)
4. (Denmark) Kim Astrup / Anders Skaarup Rasmussen (final)
5. (Denmark) Mathias Boe / Mathias Christiansen (withdrew)
6. (Poland) Adam Cwalina / Przemyslaw Wacha (quarterfinals)
7. (Germany) Michael Fuchs / Johannes Schoettler (quarterfinals)
8. (France) Baptiste Careme / Ronan Labar (quarterfinals)

=== Top half ===
First round

Second round

Quarterfinals

Semifinals

1
- (Russia) V Ivanov
- (Russia) I Sozonov
15
21
21

- (Netherlands) R Jille
- (Netherlands) R Tabeling
21
17
12

1
- (Russia) V Ivanov
- (Russia) I Sozonov
21
21

- (Lithuania) P Bartusis
- (Lithuania) A Plavin
13
9

- (Germany) R Beck
- (Germany) P Käsbauer
16
13

- (Germany) R Beck
- (Germany) P Käsbauer
21
21

1
- (Russia) V Ivanov
- (Russia) I Sozonov
15
21
21

6
- (Poland) A Cwalina
- (Poland) P Wacha
21
21

6
- (Poland) A Cwalina
- (Poland) P Wacha
21
14
12

- (Scotland) M Campbell
- (Scotland) P MacHugh
14
17

6
- (Poland) A Cwalina
- (Poland) P Wacha
21
21

- (Greece) G Galvas
- (Greece) P Skarlatos
12
13

- (Austria) D Stipsits
- (Austria) R Zirnwald
13
6

- (Austria) D Stipsits
- (Austria) R Zirnwald
21
21

1
- (Russia) V Ivanov
- (Russia) I Sozonov
19
21
16^{r}

4
- (Denmark) K Astrup
- (Denmark) A S Rasmussen
21
30

4
- (Denmark) K Astrup
- (Denmark) A S Rasmussen
21
15
17

- (Republic of Ireland) J Magee
- (Republic of Ireland) S Magee
9
28

4
- (Denmark) K Astrup
- (Denmark) A S Rasmussen
21
21

- (Bulgaria) D Nikolov
- (Bulgaria) I Rusev
w
/
o

- (Bulgaria) D Nikolov
- (Bulgaria) I Rusev
11
6

- (Germany) M Lamsfuß
- (Germany) M E Seidel

4
- (Denmark) K Astrup
- (Denmark) A S Rasmussen
21
21

8
- (France) B Careme
- (France) R Labar
21
21

8
- (France) B Careme
- (France) R Labar
8
8

- (England) P Briggs
- (England) T Wolfenden
19
19

8
- (France) B Careme
- (France) R Labar
21
21

- (Israel) A Bass
- (Israel) S Geffen
15
12

- (Estonia) K Kaljurand
- (Estonia) R Käsner
16
15

- (Estonia) K Kaljurand
- (Estonia) R Käsner
21
21

=== Bottom half ===
First round

Second round

Quarterfinals

Semifinals

- (Ukraine) G Natarov
- (Ukraine) A Pochtarov
12
12^{r}

- (Scotland) R Blair
- (Scotland) A Hall
21
19

- (Scotland) R Blair
- (Scotland) A Hall
21
21

- (England) M Nottingham
- (England) H Towler
w
/
o

- (England) M Nottingham
- (England) H Towler
14
18

5
- (Denmark) M Boe
- (Denmark) M Christiansen

- (Scotland) R Blair
- (Scotland) A Hall
19
13

- (Norway) F Kristensen
- (Norway) J Kristensen
8
12

3
- (England) M Ellis
- (England) C Langridge
21
21

- (Croatia) Z Durkinjak
- (Croatia) Z Hoelbling
21
21

- (Croatia) Z Durkinjak
- (Croatia) Z Hoelbling
14
10

- (Poland) M Bochat
- (Poland) L Moren
12
11

3
- (England) M Ellis
- (England) C Langridge
21
21

3
- (England) M Ellis
- (England) C Langridge
21
21

3
- (England) M Ellis
- (England) C Langridge
19
14

- (Belgium) M Dierickx
- (Belgium) F Golinski
21
21

2
- (Denmark) M P Kolding
- (Denmark) M C Petersen
21
21

- (Azerbaijan) O Qalandarov
- (Azerbaijan) K Rzayev
10
6

- (Belgium) M Dierickx
- (Belgium) F Golinski
17
12

- (France) B Kersaudy
- (France) G Mittelheisser
18
12

7
- (Germany) M Fuchs
- (Germany) J Schoettler
21
21

7
- (Germany) M Fuchs
- (Germany) J Schoettler
21
21

7
- (Germany) M Fuchs
- (Germany) J Schoettler
18
14

- (Switzerland) P Deschenaux
- (Switzerland) O Schaller
22
21

2
- (Denmark) M P Kolding
- (Denmark) M C Petersen
21
21

- (Italy) G Greco
- (Italy) R Maddaloni
20
12

- (Switzerland) P Deschenaux
- (Switzerland) O Schaller
10
10

- (Russia) N Khakimov
- (Russia) V Kuznetsov
10
6

2
- (Denmark) M P Kolding
- (Denmark) M C Petersen
21
21

2
- (Denmark) M P Kolding
- (Denmark) M C Petersen
21
21

=== Finals ===
Semifinals

Final

1
- (Russia) Vladimir Ivanov
- (Russia) Ivan Sozonov
19
21
16^{r}

4
- (Denmark) Kim Astrup
- (Denmark) Anders Skaarup Rasmussen
21
15
17

4
- (Denmark) Kim Astrup
- (Denmark) Anders Skaarup Rasmussen
21
18
13

2
- (Denmark) Mads Pieler Kolding
- (Denmark) Mads Conrad-Petersen
14
21
21

3
- (England) Marcus Ellis
- (England) Chris Langridge
19
14

2
- (Denmark) Mads Pieler Kolding
- (Denmark) Mads Conrad-Petersen
21
21

== Women's doubles ==
=== Seeds ===
1. (Denmark) Christinna Pedersen / Kamilla Rytter Juhl (champion)
2. (Netherlands) Eefje Muskens / Selena Piek (final)
3. (Bulgaria) Gabriela Stoeva / Stefani Stoeva (quarterfinals)
4. (Germany) Johanna Goliszewski / Carla Nelte (quarterfinals)

=== Top half ===
First round

Second round

Quarterfinals

Semifinals

1
- (Denmark) K R Juhl
- (Denmark) C Pedersen
21
21

- (Estonia) K Kuuba
- (Estonia) H Rüütel
21
21

- (Estonia) K Kuuba
- (Estonia) H Rüütel
12
12

- (Czech Republic) M Lajdova
- (Czech Republic) D Sikalova
12
10

1
- (Denmark) K R Juhl
- (Denmark) C Pedersen
21
21

- (Latvia) I Pope
- (Latvia) K Šefere
9
12

- (Russia) E Bolotova
- (Russia) E Kosetskaya
15
10

- (Russia) E Bolotova
- (Russia) E Kosetskaya
21
21

- (Russia) E Bolotova
- (Russia) E Kosetskaya
21
21

- (Republic of Ireland) S Boyle
- (Republic of Ireland) R Darragh
8
21
15

- (France) M Batomene
- (France) É Lefel
15
12

- (France) M Batomene
- (France) É Lefel
21
17
21

1
- (Denmark) K R Juhl
- (Denmark) C Pedersen
21
21

4
- (Germany) J Goliszewski
- (Germany) C Nelte
21
21

- (Netherlands) S Barning
- (Netherlands) I Tabeling
9
13

- (Slovenia) A M Šetina
- (Slovenia) K Stanković
10
12

4
- (Germany) J Goliszewski
- (Germany) C Nelte
21
21

- (England) J Pugh
- (England) S Walker
21
21

- (England) J Pugh
- (England) S Walker
16
11

- (Sweden) C Nistad
- (Sweden) E Wengberg
18
16

4
- (Germany) J Goliszewski
- (Germany) C Nelte
21
20
19

- (Switzerland) C Burkart
- (Switzerland) T Girona
21
17
15

- (Netherlands) S Barning
- (Netherlands) I Tabeling
17
22
21

- (Lithuania) V Fomkinaite
- (Lithuania) G Voitechovskaja
17
21
21

- (Lithuania) V Fomkinaite
- (Lithuania) G Voitechovskaja
10
7

- (Germany) L Efler
- (Germany) L Käpplein
15
7

- (Netherlands) S Barning
- (Netherlands) I Tabeling
21
21

- (Netherlands) S Barning
- (Netherlands) I Tabeling
21
21

=== Bottom half ===
First round

Second round

Quarterfinals

Semifinals

- (Belarus) A Cherniavskaya
- (Belarus) A Zaitsava
10
12

- (France) A Fontaine
- (France) A Tran
21
21

- (France) A Fontaine
- (France) A Tran
17
16

- (Denmark) M Fruergaard
- (Denmark) S Thygesen
21
16
21

- (Denmark) M Fruergaard
- (Denmark) S Thygesen
21
21

- (Russia) A Chervyakova
- (Russia) O Morozova
18
21
19

- (Denmark) M Fruergaard
- (Denmark) S Thygesen
21
14
21

- (Finland) M Lindholm
- (Finland) J Nyström
12
12

3
- (Bulgaria) G Stoeva
- (Bulgaria) S Stoeva
14
21
18

- (England) H Olver
- (England) L Smith
21
21

- (England) H Olver
- (England) L Smith
20
21
18

- (Turkey) C Fere
- (Turkey) E Yazgan
6
17

3
- (Bulgaria) G Stoeva
- (Bulgaria) S Stoeva
22
15
21

3
- (Bulgaria) G Stoeva
- (Bulgaria) S Stoeva
21
21

- (Denmark) M Fruergaard
- (Denmark) S Thygesen
17
17

- (Ukraine) N Voytsekh
- (Ukraine) Y Zharka
11
7

2
- (Netherlands) E Muskens
- (Netherlands) S Piek
21
21

WC
- (France) D Delrue
- (France) L Palermo
21
21

WC
- (France) D Delrue
- (France) L Palermo
14
15

- (Norway) A Klyve
- (Norway) H Sogaard
4
9

- (Germany) I Herttrich
- (Germany) B Michels
21
21

- (Germany) I Herttrich
- (Germany) B Michels
21
21

- (Germany) I Herttrich
- (Germany) B Michels
21
13
10

- (Malta) S F Marie
- (Spain) L Oset
12
14

2
- (Netherlands) E Muskens
- (Netherlands) S Piek
17
21
21

- (Hungary) Á Kőrösi
- (Hungary) O Varga
21
21

- (Hungary) Á Kőrösi
- (Hungary) O Varga
14
10

2
- (Netherlands) E Muskens
- (Netherlands) S Piek
21
21

=== Finals ===
Semifinals

Final

1
- (Denmark) Kamilla Rytter Juhl
- (Denmark) Christinna Pedersen
21
21

- (Netherlands) Samantha Barning
- (Netherlands) Iris Tabeling
9
13

1
- (Denmark) Kamilla Rytter Juhl
- (Denmark) Christinna Pedersen
21
21

2
- (Netherlands) Eefje Muskens
- (Netherlands) Selena Piek
18
17

- (Denmark) Maiken Fruergaard
- (Denmark) Sara Thygesen
17
17

2
- (Netherlands) Eefje Muskens
- (Netherlands) Selena Piek
21
21

== Mixed doubles ==
=== Seeds ===
1. (England) Chris Adcock / Gabby Adcock (quarterfinals)
2. (Denmark) Joachim Fischer Nielsen / Christinna Pedersen (champion)
3. (Netherlands) Jacco Arends / Selena Piek (semifinals)
4. (Poland) Robert Mateusiak / Nadieżda Zięba (first round)
5. (Germany) Michael Fuchs / Birgit Michels (quarterfinals)
6. (Russia) Vitalij Durkin / Nina Vislova (second round)
7. (France) Ronan Labar / Emilie Lefel (second round)
8. (Denmark) Niclas Nohr / Sara Thygesen (final)

=== Top half ===
First round

Second round

Quarterfinals

Semifinals

1
- (England) C Adcock
- (England) G Adcock
21
21

- (Finland) A Kaisti
- (Finland) M Lindholm
7
10

1
- (England) C Adcock
- (England) G Adcock
21
17
21

- (Sweden) N Ruponen
- (Sweden) A Högström
w
/
o

- (Sweden) N Ruponen
- (Sweden) A Hogstrom
13
21
18

- (Germany) M E Seidel
- (Germany) L Efler

1
- (England) C Adcock
- (England) G Adcock
21
19
19

7
- (France) R Labar
- (France) E Lefel
23
21
21

- (Denmark) M Christiansen
- (Denmark) L Grebak
14
21
21

- (Russia) E Dremin
- (Russia) E Dimova
25
19
16

7
- (France) R Labar
- (France) E Lefel
12
25
13

- (Netherlands) R Jille
- (Netherlands) I Tabeling
19
19

- (Denmark) M Christiansen
- (Denmark) L Grebak
21
23
21

- (Denmark) M Christiansen
- (Denmark) L Grebak
21
21

- (Denmark) M Christiansen
- (Denmark) L Grebak
21
18
17

4
- (Poland) R Mateusiak
- (Poland) N Zięba
18
21
18

8
- (Denmark) N Nohr
- (Denmark) S Thygesen
15
21
21

- (Republic of Ireland) S Magee
- (Republic of Ireland) C Magee
21
13
21

- (Republic of Ireland) S Magee
- (Republic of Ireland) C Magee
21
14
24

- (Germany) M Lamsfuß
- (Germany) I Herttrich
21
21

- (Germany) M Lamsfuß
- (Germany) I Herttrich
19
21
22

- (Russia) R Kargaev
- (Russia) E Bolotova
19
13

- (Republic of Ireland) S Magee
- (Republic of Ireland) C Magee
20
12

8
- (Denmark) N Nohr
- (Denmark) S Thygesen
21
21

8
- (Denmark) N Nohr
- (Denmark) S Thygesen
22
21

- (Czech Republic) J Janáček
- (Czech Republic) K Tomalova
10
13

8
- (Denmark) N Nohr
- (Denmark) S Thygesen
21
21

- (England) G Mairs
- (England) J Moore
21
21

- (England) G Mairs
- (England) J Moore
11
18

- (Greece) P Tentas
- (Greece) I Tenta
4
5

=== Bottom half ===
First round

Second round

Quarterfinals

Semifinals

WC
- (England) B Lane
- (England) J Pugh
21
18
16

- (France) B Kersaudy
- (France) L Palermo
14
21
21

- (France) B Kersaudy
- (France) L Palermo
22
21

- (Lithuania) P Bartusis
- (Lithuania) V Fomkinaite
11
13

6
- (Russia) V Durkin
- (Russia) N Vislova
20
14

6
- (Russia) V Durkin
- (Russia) N Vislova
21
21

- (France) B Kersaudy
- (France) L Palermo
17
20

- (France) G Mittelheisser
- (France) A Fontaine
w
/
o

3
- (Netherlands) J Arends
- (Netherlands) S Piek
21
22

- (Croatia) I Cimbur
- (Croatia) S Poznanovic

- (France) G Mittelheisser
- (France) A Fontaine
21
18
19

- (Ukraine) G Natarov
- (Ukraine) N Voytsekh
22
14
20

3
- (Netherlands) J Arends
- (Netherlands) S Piek
17
21
21

3
- (Netherlands) J Arends
- (Netherlands) S Piek
20
21
22

- (Netherlands) J Arends
- (Netherlands) S Piek
17
8

- (England) M Nottingham
- (England) E Westwood
21
18
21

2
- (Denmark) C Pedersen
- (Denmark) J F Nielsen
21
21

- (Switzerland) O Schaller
- (Switzerland) C Burkart
8
21
23

- (Switzerland) O Schaller
- (Switzerland) C Burkart
10
14

- (Latvia) N Podosinoviks
- (Latvia) K Sefere
2
10

5
- (Germany) M Fuchs
- (Germany) B Michels
21
21

5
- (Germany) M Fuchs
- (Germany) B Michels
21
21

5
- (Germany) M Fuchs
- (Germany) B Michels
15
15

- (Austria) D Obernosterer
- (Austria) E Baldauf
16
21
17

2
- (Denmark) C Pedersen
- (Denmark) J F Nielsen
21
21

- (Wales) D Font
- (Wales) C Turner
21
15
21

- (Wales) D Font
- (Wales) C Turner
6
4

- (Poland) P Pietryja
- (Poland) A Wojtkowska
9
10

2
- (Denmark) C Pedersen
- (Denmark) J F Nielsen
21
21

2
- (Denmark) C Pedersen
- (Denmark) J F Nielsen
21
21

=== Finals ===
Semifinals

Final

- (Denmark) Mathias Christiansen
- (Denmark) Lena Grebak
21
18
17

8
- (Denmark) Niclas Nohr
- (Denmark) Sara Thygesen
15
21
21

8
- (Denmark) Niclas Nohr
- (Denmark) Sara Thygesen
21
13
17

2
- (Denmark) Christinna Pedersen
- (Denmark) Joachim Fischer Nielsen
19
21
21

- (Netherlands) Jacco Arends
- (Netherlands) Selena Piek
17
8

2
- (Denmark) Christinna Pedersen
- (Denmark) Joachim Fischer Nielsen
21
21
