= 2015 Scottish Open Grand Prix =

2015 Scottish Grand Prix
Tournament details
- Dates: November 18, 2015 - November 22, 2015
- Level: Grand Prix
- Total prize money: US$50,000
- Venue: Emirates Arena
- Location: Glasgow, Scotland

Champions
- Men's singles: (Denmark) Hans-Kristian Vittinghus
- Women's singles: (Denmark) Line Kjaersfeldt
- Men's doubles: (Germany) Michael Fuchs (Germany) Johannes Schoettler
- Women's doubles: (Japan) Yuki Fukushima (Japan) Sayaka Hirota
- Mixed doubles: (Russia) Vitalij Durkin (Russia) Nina Vislova

The 2015 Scottish Open Grand Prix was the seventeenth grand prix gold and grand prix tournament of the 2015 BWF Grand Prix Gold and Grand Prix. The tournament was held in Emirates Arena, Glasgow, Scotland November 18–22, 2015 and had a total purse of $50,000.

== Men's singles ==
=== Seeds ===
1. (Denmark) Hans-Kristian Vittinghus (champion)
2. (England) Rajiv Ouseph (final)
3. (Republic of Ireland) Scott Evans (first round)
4. (Spain) Pablo Abián (first round)
5. (Estonia) Raul Must (semifinals)
6. (Israel) Misha Zilberman (second round)
7. (Russia) Vladimir Malkov (second round)
8. (Denmark) Emil Holst (quarterfinals)
9. (Finland) Ville Lang (third round)
10. (Ukraine) Dmytro Zavadsky (first round)
11. (India) Anand Pawar (quarterfinals)
12. (France) Thomas Rouxel (first round)
13. (Poland) Adrian Dziolko (third round)
14. (Austria) David Obernosterer (quarterfinals)
15. (Belgium) Yuhan Tan (quarterfinals)
16. (Sweden) Henri Hurskainen (withdrew)

=== Finals ===
Quarterfinals
1	(Denmark) Hans-Kristian Vittinghus	12	21	21
11	(India) Anand Pawar	21	10	13
15	(Belgium) Yuhan Tan	18	8
5	(Estonia) Raul Must	21	21
14	(Austria) David Obernosterer	16	11
(Denmark) Kim Bruun	21	21
8	(Denmark) Emil Holst	12	11
2	(England) Rajiv Ouseph	21	21

Semifinals
1	(Denmark) Hans-Kristian Vittinghus	21	21
5	(Estonia) Raul Must	11	16
(Denmark) Kim Bruun	16	7
2	(England) Rajiv Ouseph	21	21

Final
1	(Denmark) Hans-Kristian Vittinghus	21	11	21
2	(England) Rajiv Ouseph	19	21	16

=== Top half ===
==== Section 1 ====
First Round
1	(Denmark) H-K Vittinghus	19	21	21
(France) L Corvee	21	8	16
(England) M Spencer-Smith	15
(Austria) M Almer	5^{r}
13	(Poland) A Dziolko	21	21
Q2	(England) O Thompson	9	9
(England) A Smith	21	21
(United States) S Pongnairat	17	14

Second Round
1	(Denmark) H-K Vittinghus	21	21
(England) M Spencer-Smith	6	11
13	(Poland) A Dziolko	21	21
(England) A Smith	11	9

Third Round
1	(Denmark) H-K Vittinghus	21	21
13	(Poland) A Dziolko	15	15

==== Section 2 ====
First Round
7	(Russia) V Malkov	21	21
Q6	(England) J Douse	12	11
(Denmark) R Fladberg	14	21	21
(Germany) D Domke	21	16	23
11	(India) A Pawar	21	21
(Scotland) K Merrilees	18	18
(Slovenia) A Roj	21	21
Q4	(Luxembourg) R Mann	13	7

Second Round
7	(Russia) V Malkov	12	21	16
(Germany) D Domke	21	15	21
11	(India) A Pawar	21	21
(Slovenia) A Roj	17	15

Third Round
(Germany) D Domke	13	13
11	(India) A Pawar	21	21

==== Section 3 ====
First Round
3	(Republic of Ireland) S Evans	16	18
Q3	(Chinese Taipei) Lee C-h	21	21
(Lithuania) K Navickas	16	19
(Sweden) M Borg	21	21
15	(Belgium) Y Tan	21	21
(Czech Republic) A Mendrek	14	18
(Poland) M Dubowski	21	11	19
(Scotland) B Torrance	10	21	21

Second Round
Q3	(Chinese Taipei) Lee C-h	21	21
(Sweden) M Borg	19	17
15	(Belgium) Y Tan	22	21
(Scotland) B Torrance	20	15

Third Round
Q3	(Chinese Taipei) Lee C-h	17	19
15	(Belgium) Y Tan	21	21

==== Section 4 ====
First Round
5	(Estonia) R Must	21	21
(Netherlands) E Meijs	19	14
(England) R Walker	20	21	13
(Finland) E Heino	22	14	21
10	(Ukraine) D Zavadsky	21	16	20
(Denmark) C L Thomsen	13	21	22
PFQ	(Algeria) M A Belarbi	w/o
(England) T Penty

Second Round
5	(Estonia) R Must	21	16	21
(Finland) E Heino	17	21	10
(Denmark) C L Thomsen	13	13
(England) T Penty	21	21

Third Round
5	(Estonia) R Must	21	21
(England) T Penty	18	9

=== Bottom half ===
==== Section 5 ====
First Round
PFQ	(England) R Midha	21	17
(Switzerland) M Bonny	17	7^{r}
(Republic of Ireland) J Magee	16	13
14	(Austria) D Obernosterer	21	21
Q5	(England) H L Ngan	11	9
(Slovenia) I Utrosa	21	21
PFQ	(Austria) W Gnedt	15	12
6	(Israel) M Zilberman	21	21

Second Round
PFQ	(England) R Midha	9	12
14	(Austria) D Obernosterer	21	21
(Slovenia) I Utrosa	13	21	21
6	(Israel) M Zilberman	21	11	11

Third Round
14	(Austria) D Obernosterer	13	21	21
(Slovenia) I Utrosa	21	12	12

==== Section 6 ====
First Round
(Poland) M Rogalski	17	21	21
(Scotland) M Carder	21	19	9
(Netherlands) N Fransman	21	21
12	(France) T Rouxel	13	7
(England) S Parsons	21	22
(India) A Prakash	4	20
(Denmark) K Bruun	21	23
4	(Spain) P Abián	18	21

Second Round
(Poland) M Rogalski	14	22
(Netherlands) N Fransman	21	24
(England) S Parsons	21	16	11
(Denmark) K Bruun	18	21	21

Third Round
(Netherlands) N Fransman	16	9^{r}
(Denmark) K Bruun	21	15

==== Section 7 ====
First Round
(England) A Lane	21	21
PFQ	(Lithuania) P Bartusis	19	15
(Algeria) A Hamek	w/o
9	(Finland) V Lang
Q7	(England) A Marritt	21	21
Q8	(England) J Torjussen	15	12
(Ukraine) A Pochtarev	13	14
8	(Denmark) E Holst	21	21

Second Round
(England) A Lane	21	13	14
9	(Finland) V Lang	16	21	21
Q7	(England) A Marritt	14	16
8	(Denmark) E Holst	21	21

Third Round
9	(Finland) V Lang	16	8
8	(Denmark) E Holst	21	21

==== Section 8 ====
First Round
Q1	(England) D Jones	21	15	11
(Malaysia) Chiang J S	19	21	21
(England) D Adamson	21	21
PFQ	(England) J Young	11	19
(Germany) D Benz	4	14
(France) L Claerbout	21	21
(Czech Republic) P Koukal	15	8
2	(England) R Ouseph	21	21

Second Round
(Malaysia) Chiang J S	21	21
(England) D Adamson	18	14
(France) L Claerbout	18	8
2	(England) R Ouseph	21	21

Third Round
(Malaysia) Chiang J S	8	11
2	(England) R Ouseph	21	21

== Women's singles ==
=== Seeds ===
1. (Scotland) Kirsty Gilmour (final)
2. (Spain) Beatriz Corrales (semifinals)
3. (Germany) Karin Schnaase (first round)
4. (Denmark) Line Kjaersfeldt (champion)
5. (Bulgaria) Linda Zetchiri (quarterfinals)
6. (Republic of Ireland) Chloe Magee (first round)
7. (Switzerland) Sabrina Jaquet (first round)
8. (Bulgaria) Petya Nedelcheva (first round)

=== Finals ===
Semifinals
1	(Scotland) Kirsty Gilmour	17	21	21
(Denmark) Anna Thea Madsen	21	11	13
4	(Denmark) Line Kjaersfeldt	21	21
2	(Spain) Beatriz Corrales	6	14

Final
1	(Scotland) Kirsty Gilmour	21	16	18
4	(Denmark) Line Kjaersfeldt	16	21	21

=== Top half ===
==== Section 1 ====
First Round
1	(Scotland) K Gilmour	21	21
Q3	(Scotland) J MacPherson	6	7
(Denmark) N K Rohde	16	21	21
Q2	(Japan) S Hirota	21	19	15
7	(Switzerland) S Jaquet	20	21	17
(Finland) A Mikkela	22	18	21
(Chinese Taipei) Lee C-h	16	6
(Japan) A Mine	21	21

Second Round
1	(Scotland) K Gilmour	21	21
(Denmark) N K Rohde	10	15
(Finland) A Mikkela	18	13
(Japan) A Mine	21	21

Quarterfinals
1	(Scotland) K Gilmour	21	21
(Japan) A Mine	19	14

==== Section 2 ====
First Round
3	(Germany) K Schnaase	21	13	15
(Russia) N Perminova	11	21	21
PFQ	(Slovakia) M Repiska	11	9
(Netherlands) S Eijbergen	21	21
8	(Bulgaria) P Nedelcheva	11	21	11
(Denmark) A T Madsen	21	12	21
(Malaysia) L Cheah	14	17
(England) F M Chapman	21	21

Second Round
(Russia) N Perminova	20	9
(Netherlands) S Eijbergen	22	21
(Denmark) A T Madsen	21	21
(England) F M Chapman	16	14

Quarterfinals
(Netherlands) S Eijbergen	16	9
(Denmark) A T Madsen	21	21

=== Bottom half ===
==== Section 3 ====
First Round
Q1	(Japan) Y Fukushima	21	21
Q4	(Denmark) J Finne-Ipsen	12	11
(France) D Lansac	21	21
6	(Republic of Ireland) C Magee	18	14
(Denmark) M Poulsen	19	10
(Germany) O Konon	21	21
(Mauritius) K F Kune	6	9
4	(Denmark) L Kjaersfeldt	21	21

Second Round
Q1	(Japan) Y Fukushima	20	21	21
(France) D Lansac	22	13	11
(Germany) O Konon	15	21	9
4	(Denmark) L Kjaersfeldt	21	15	21

Quarterfinals
Q1	(Japan) Y Fukushima	21	21	18
4	(Denmark) L Kjaersfeldt	19	23	21

==== Section 4 ====
First Round
(Slovakia) J Ciznarova	12	12
(England) C Birch	21	21
(Russia) K Polikarpova	21	21	17
5	(Bulgaria) L Zetchiri	17	23	21
(Croatia) D Sutara	9	19
(Finland) N Vainio	21	21
(India) T Lad	21	14	15
2	(Spain) B Corrales	18	21	21

Second Round
(England) C Birch	23	17	9
5	(Bulgaria) L Zetchiri	21	21	21
(Finland) N Vainio	17	19
2	(Spain) B Corrales	21	21

Quarterfinals
5	(Bulgaria) L Zetchiri	21	15	19
2	(Spain) B Corrales	18	21	21

== Men's doubles ==
=== Seeds ===
1. (India) Manu Attri / B. Sumeeth Reddy (quarterfinals)
2. (England) Marcus Ellis / Chris Langridge (semifinals)
3. (Poland) Adam Cwalina / Przemyslaw Wacha (semifinals)
4. (Germany) Michael Fuchs / Johannes Schoettler (champion)
5. (England) Andrew Ellis / Peter Mills (final)
6. (United States) Phillip Chew / Sattawat Pongnairat (first round)
7. (Germany) Max Schwenger / Josche Zurwonne (withdrew)
8. (France) Baptiste Careme / Ronan Labar (quarterfinals)

=== Finals ===
Semifinals
5	(England) Andrew Ellis (England) Peter Mills	21	12	21
3	(Poland) Adam Cwalina (Poland) Przemyslaw Wacha	19	21	15
4	(Germany) Michael Fuchs (Germany) Johannes Schoettler	21	16	22
2	(England) Marcus Ellis (England) Chris Langridge	15	21	20

Final
5	(England) Andrew Ellis (England) Peter Mills	15	18
4	(Germany) Michael Fuchs (Germany) Johannes Schoettler	21	21

=== Top half ===
==== Section 1 ====
First Round
1	(India) M Attri (India) B. S Reddy	21	17	21
(France) B Kersaudy (France) G Mittelheisser	14	21	17
(England) O Baczala (England) G Mairs	13	17
(England) C Coles (Netherlands) J Maas	21	21
5	(England) A Ellis (England) P Mills
(Australia) M Chau (Australia) S Serasinghe	w/o
(Belgium) M Dierickx (Belgium) F Golinski	21	21
(Switzerland) P Deschenaux (Switzerland) O Schaller	16	16

Second Round
1	(India) M Attri (India) B. S Reddy	17	21	21
(England) C Coles (Netherlands) J Maas	21	17	14
5	(England) A Ellis (England) P Mills	17	21	21
(Belgium) M Dierickx (Belgium) F Golinski	21	12	17

Quarterfinals
1	(India) M Attri (India) B. S Reddy	17	15
5	(England) A Ellis (England) P Mills	21	21

==== Section 2 ====
First Round
3	(Poland) A Cwalina (Poland) P Wacha	21	21
(England) R Golding (England) V Liew	15	12
(Scotland) R Blair (Scotland) A Hall	10	27	17
(Germany) R Beck (Germany) P Kaesbauer	21	25	21
PFQ	(Germany) D Benz (Malaysia) Chiang J S
Q1	(Slovenia) A Roj (Slovenia) I Utrosa	w/o
Q3	(Netherlands) R Jille (Netherlands) R Tabeling	21	21
PFQ	(England) A Marritt (England) M Roe	19	16

Second Round
3	(Poland) A Cwalina (Poland) P Wacha	21	15	21
(Germany) R Beck (Germany) P Kaesbauer	19	21	13
PFQ	(Germany) D Benz (Malaysia) Chiang J S	21	9	19
Q3	(Netherlands) R Jille (Netherlands) R Tabeling	14	21	21

Quarterfinals
3	(Poland) A Cwalina (Poland) P Wacha	21	21
Q3	(Netherlands) R Jille (Netherlands) R Tabeling	13	14

=== Bottom half ===
==== Section 3 ====
First Round
(Republic of Ireland) J Magee (Republic of Ireland) S Magee	23	15	19
(Poland) M Bochat (Poland) L Moren	21	21	21
(India) V Prasad (India) J Yadav	9	11
8	(France) B Careme (France) R Labar	21	21
(Algeria) M A Belarbi (Algeria) A Hamek	w/o
(Denmark) M Christiansen (Denmark) D Daugaard
PFQ	(England) M Nottingham (England) S Vendy	5	21	13
4	(Germany) M Fuchs (Germany) J Schoettler	21	19	21

Second Round
(Poland) M Bochat (Poland) L Moren	16	14
8	(France) B Careme (France) R Labar	21	21
(Denmark) M Christiansen (Denmark) D Daugaard	19	11
4	(Germany) M Fuchs (Germany) J Schoettler	21	21

Quarterfinals
8	(France) B Careme (France) R Labar	18	14
4	(Germany) M Fuchs (Germany) J Schoettler	21	21

==== Section 4 ====
First Round
(England) D Adamson (England) S Sankey	13	15
Q2	(Scotland) C Grimley (Scotland) M Grimley	21	21
Q4	(Germany) M Lamsfuss (Germany) M E Seidel	19	21	21
6	(United States) P Chew (United States) S Pongnairat	21	16	15
(Scotland) A Dunn (Scotland) J Neil	21	21
PFQ	(England) J Mcdonald (England) A Wainwright	12	18
(Scotland) M Campbell (Scotland) P Machugh	17	12
2	(England) M Ellis (England) C Langridge	21	21

Second Round
Q2	(Scotland) C Grimley (Scotland) M Grimley	8	9
Q4	(Germany) M Lamsfuss (Germany) M E Seidel	21	21
(Scotland) A Dunn (Scotland) J Neil	15	12
2	(England) M Ellis (England) C Langridge	21	21

Quarterfinals
Q4	(Germany) M Lamsfuss (Germany) M E Seidel	21	19
2	(England) M Ellis (England) C Langridge	23	21

== Women's doubles ==
=== Seeds ===
1. (Bulgaria) Gabriela Stoeva / Stefani Stoeva (quarterfinals)
2. (Germany) Johanna Goliszewski / Carla Nelte (quarterfinals)
3. (England) Heather Olver / Lauren Smith (quarterfinals)
4. (Russia) Ekaterina Bolotova / Evgeniya Kosetskaya (withdrew)

=== Finals ===
Semifinals
(Japan) Yuki Fukushima (Japan) Sayaka Hirota	17	21	21
(Germany) Isabel Herttrich (Germany) Birgit Michels	21	10	10
(England) Chloe Birch (England) Jenny Wallwork	15	15
(Netherlands) Samantha Barning (Netherlands) Iris Tabeling	21	21

Final
(Japan) Yuki Fukushima (Japan) Sayaka Hirota	21	14
(Netherlands) Samantha Barning (Netherlands) Iris Tabeling	14	11^{r}

=== Top half ===
==== Section 1 ====
First Round
1	(Bulgaria) G Stoeva (Bulgaria) S Stoeva
BYE
(Scotland) J MacPherson (Scotland) E O'Donnell
BYE
(Denmark) J Finne-Ipsen (Denmark) M Fruergaard
BYE
(Japan) Y Fukushima (Japan) S Hirota	21	21
(Scotland) C Torrance (Scotland) T Woods	2	8

Second Round
1	(Bulgaria) G Stoeva (Bulgaria) S Stoeva	21	21
(Scotland) J MacPherson (Scotland) E O'Donnell	10	5
(Denmark) J Finne-Ipsen (Denmark) M Fruergaard	15	10
(Japan) Y Fukushima (Japan) S Hirota	21	21

Quarterfinals
1	(Bulgaria) G Stoeva (Bulgaria) S Stoeva	18	21	18
(Japan) Y Fukushima (Japan) S Hirota	21	19	21

==== Section 2 ====
First Round
3	(England) H Olver (England) L Smith
BYE
(Wales) A Moran (England) K Scott	w/o
(England) J Moore (England) V Williams
(Germany) I Herttrich (Germany) B Michels
BYE
(Switzerland) A Huser (Switzerland) S Jaquet	12	14
(France) A Fontaine (France) A Tran	21	21

Second Round
3	(England) H Olver (England) L Smith	16	21	21
(England) J Moore (England) V Williams	21	18	16
(Germany) I Herttrich (Germany) B Michels	15	21	21
(France) A Fontaine (France) A Tran	21	15	16

Quarterfinals
3	(England) H Olver (England) L Smith	19	22	15
(Germany) I Herttrich (Germany) B Michels	21	20	21

=== Bottom half ===
==== Section 3 ====
First Round
(Australia) S Mapasa (Australia) G Somerville	15
(Switzerland) C Burkart (Switzerland) T Girona	10^{r}
BYE
(Japan) R Etoh (Japan) A Matsuda
(England) C Birch (England) J Wallwork	21	21
(Wales) J Hart (England) J Hopton	11	11
BYE
4	(Russia) E Bolotova (Russia) E Kosetskaya

Second Round
(Australia) S Mapasa (Australia) G Somerville	18	18
(Japan) R Etoh (Japan) A Matsuda	21	21
(England) C Birch (England) J Wallwork
4	(Russia) E Bolotova (Russia) E Kosetskaya	w/o

Quarterfinals
(Japan) R Etoh (Japan) A Matsuda	14	16
(England) C Birch (England) J Wallwork	21	21

==== Section 4 ====
First Round
(Netherlands) S Barning (Netherlands) I Tabeling	21	21
(France) M Batomene (France) E Lefel	19	18
BYE
(England) S Brown (England) K Robertshaw
(Germany) L Efler (Germany) F Volkmann	21	19	0^{r}
(Scotland) R Findlay (Scotland) K Geals	16	21	0
BYE
2	(Germany) J Goliszewski (Germany) C Nelte

Second Round
(Netherlands) S Barning (Netherlands) I Tabeling	21	21
(England) S Brown (England) K Robertshaw	18	16
(Scotland) R Findlay (Scotland) K Geals	11	8
2	(Germany) J Goliszewski (Germany) C Nelte	21	21

Quarterfinals
(Netherlands) S Barning (Netherlands) I Tabeling	21	21
2	(Germany) J Goliszewski (Germany) C Nelte	15	10

== Mixed doubles ==
=== Seeds ===
1. (Germany) Michael Fuchs / Birgit Michels (quarterfinals)
2. (United States) Phillip Chew / Jamie Subandhi (first round)
3. (France) Ronan Labar / Emilie Lefel (final)
4. (Republic of Ireland) Sam Magee / Chloe Magee (quarterfinals)
5. (Poland) Robert Mateusiak / Nadiezda Zieba (quarterfinals)
6. (Russia) Vitalij Durkin / Nina Vislova (champion)
7. (France) Gaetan Mittelheisser / Audrey Fontaine (semifinals)
8. (Denmark) Mathias Christiansen / Lena Grebak (quarterfinals)

=== Finals ===
Semifinals
6	(Russia) Vitalij Durkin (Russia) Nina Vislova	16	21	23
7	(France) Gaetan Mittelheisser (France) Audrey Fontaine	21	16	21
3	(France) Ronan Labar (France) Emilie Lefel	21	18	21
(Germany) Mark Lamsfuss (Germany) Isabel Herttrich	18	21	8

Final
6	(Russia) Vitalij Durkin (Russia) Nina Vislova	21	21
3	(France) Ronan Labar (France) Emilie Lefel	14	12

=== Top half ===
==== Section 1 ====
First Round
1	(Germany) M Fuchs (Germany) B Michels	21	21
(England) C Coles (England) V Williams	9	12
(Czech Republic) J Janacek (Czech Republic) K Tomalova
(Australia) S Serasinghe (Australia) S Mapasa	w/o
6	(Russia) V Durkin (Russia) N Vislova	21	22
PFQ	(England) H Arksey (England) S Walker	19	20
(France) B Kersaudy (France) L Palermo	21	21
(Sweden) N Ruponen (Sweden) A Hogstrom	13	18

Second Round
1	(Germany) M Fuchs (Germany) B Michels	21	21
(Czech Republic) J Janacek (Czech Republic) K Tomalova	14	14
6	(Russia) V Durkin (Russia) N Vislova	21	21
(France) B Kersaudy (France) L Palermo	14	18

Quarterfinals
1	(Germany) M Fuchs (Germany) B Michels	19	21	17
6	(Russia) V Durkin (Russia) N Vislova	21	10	21

==== Section 2 ====
First Round
4	(Republic of Ireland) S Magee (Republic of Ireland) C Magee	21	21
(Germany) M E Seidel (Germany) L Efler	18	13
Q2	(England) M Nottingham (England) E Westwood	21	21
(Switzerland) O Schaller (Switzerland) C Burkart	9	9
7	(France) G Mittelheisser (France) A Fontaine	21	21	21
(Scotland) A Hall (Scotland) E O'Donnell	23	11	15
(Germany) P Kaesbauer (Germany) F Volkmann	21	21
(England) R Michael (England) J Hopton	10	11

Second Round
4	(Republic of Ireland) S Magee (Republic of Ireland) C Magee	21	18	22
Q2	(England) M Nottingham (England) E Westwood	14	21	20
7	(France) G Mittelheisser (France) A Fontaine	21	21
(Germany) P Kaesbauer (Germany) F Volkmann	19	17

Quarterfinals
4	(Republic of Ireland) S Magee (Republic of Ireland) C Magee	21	11	19
7	(France) G Mittelheisser (France) A Fontaine	7	21	21

=== Bottom half ===
==== Section 3 ====
First Round
(England) G Mairs (England) J Moore	21	21
Q4	(Netherlands) R Tabeling (Netherlands) S Barning	17	15
PFQ	(England) R J Quek (England) M Sivakumaran	10	8
8	(Denmark) M Christiansen (Denmark) L Grebak	21	21
(Scotland) M Campbell (Scotland) J MacPherson	21	21
(England) S P Williams (England) S Midha	13	12
(Germany) R Domke (Germany) K Kattenbeck	13	11
3	(France) R Labar (France) E Lefel	21	21

Second Round
(England) G Mairs (England) J Moore	19	17
8	(Denmark) M Christiansen (Denmark) L Grebak	21	21
(Scotland) M Campbell (Scotland) J MacPherson	14	18
3	(France) R Labar (France) E Lefel	21	21

Quarterfinals
8	(Denmark) M Christiansen (Denmark) L Grebak	18	14
3	(France) R Labar (France) E Lefel	21	21

==== Section 4 ====
First Round
Q3	(England) A Smith (England) J Wallwork	21	21
Q1	(Wales) W Kitching (England) T Shaw	4	10
(Netherlands) R Jille (Netherlands) I Tabeling	11	10
5	(Poland) R Mateusiak (Poland) N Zieba	21	21
(Chinese Taipei) Lee C-hao (Chinese Taipei) Lee C-hsin	17	14
(Australia) M Chau (Australia) G Somerville	21	21
(Germany) M Lamsfuss (Germany) I Herttrich	21	21
2	(United States) P Chew (United States) J Subandhi	18	11

Second Round
Q3	(England) A Smith (England) J Wallwork	20	14
5	(Poland) R Mateusiak (Poland) N Zieba	22	21
(Australia) M Chau (Australia) G Somerville	16	9
(Germany) M Lamsfuss (Germany) I Herttrich	21	21

Quarterfinals
5	(Poland) R Mateusiak (Poland) N Zieba	17	16
(Germany) M Lamsfuss (Germany) I Herttrich	21	21

Preceded by 2015 Korea Masters Grand Prix Gold	BWF Grand Prix Gold and Grand Prix; 2015 BWF Season	Succeeded by 2015 Macau Open Grand Prix Gold; 2015 Brasil Open Grand Prix
