= 2017 European Badminton Championships =

Tournament details
- Dates: 25–30 April 2017
- Venue: Sydbank Arena
- Location: Kolding, Denmark

Champions
- Men's singles: (England) Rajiv Ouseph
- Women's singles: (Spain) Carolina Marín
- Men's doubles: (Denmark) Mathias Boe (Denmark) Carsten Mogensen
- Women's doubles: (Denmark) Kamilla Rytter Juhl (Denmark) Christinna Pedersen
- Mixed doubles: (England) Chris Adcock (England) Gabrielle Adcock

The 2017 European Badminton Championships were the 26th tournament of the European Badminton Championships. They were held in Kolding, Denmark, from 25 to 30 April 2017.

== Medalists ==
Event	Gold	Silver	Bronze
Men's singles	(England) Rajiv Ouseph	(Denmark) Anders Antonsen	(Denmark) Viktor Axelsen
Men's singles	(England) Rajiv Ouseph	(Denmark) Anders Antonsen	(Denmark) Hans-Kristian Vittinghus
Women's singles	(Spain) Carolina Marín	(Scotland) Kirsty Gilmour	(Denmark) Mette Poulsen
Women's singles	(Spain) Carolina Marín	(Scotland) Kirsty Gilmour	(Switzerland) Sabrina Jaquet
Men's doubles	(Denmark) Mathias Boe (Denmark) Carsten Mogensen	(Denmark) Mads Conrad-Petersen (Denmark) Mads Pieler Kolding	(Denmark) Mathias Christiansen (Denmark) David Daugaard
Men's doubles	(Denmark) Mathias Boe (Denmark) Carsten Mogensen	(Denmark) Mads Conrad-Petersen (Denmark) Mads Pieler Kolding	(Denmark) Kim Astrup (Denmark) Anders Skaarup Rasmussen
Women's doubles	(Denmark) Kamilla Rytter Juhl (Denmark) Christinna Pedersen	(Bulgaria) Gabriela Stoeva (Bulgaria) Stefani Stoeva	(Russia) Anastasia Chervyakova (Russia) Olga Morozova
Women's doubles	(Denmark) Kamilla Rytter Juhl (Denmark) Christinna Pedersen	(Bulgaria) Gabriela Stoeva (Bulgaria) Stefani Stoeva	(England) Lauren Smith (England) Sarah Walker
Mixed doubles	(England) Chris Adcock (England) Gabrielle Adcock	(Denmark) Joachim Fischer Nielsen (Denmark) Christinna Pedersen	(Republic of Ireland) Sam Magee (Republic of Ireland) Chloe Magee
Mixed doubles	(England) Chris Adcock (England) Gabrielle Adcock	(Denmark) Joachim Fischer Nielsen (Denmark) Christinna Pedersen	(France) Ronan Labar (France) Audrey Fontaine

=== Medal table ===
Rank	Nation	Gold	Silver	Bronze	Total
1	Denmark	2	3	5	10
2	England	2	0	1	3
3	Spain	1	0	0	1
4	Bulgaria	0	1	0	1
4	Scotland	0	1	0	1
6	France	0	0	1	1
6	Ireland	0	0	1	1
6	Russia	0	0	1	1
6	Switzerland	0	0	1	1
Totals (9 entries)		5	5	10	20

== Men's singles ==
=== Seeds ===
1. (Denmark) Viktor Axelsen (semifinals)
2. (England) Rajiv Ouseph (champion)
3. (Germany) Marc Zwiebler (quarterfinals)
4. (Denmark) Hans-Kristian Vittinghus (semifinals)
5. (Denmark) Anders Antonsen (final)
6. (Spain) Pablo Abián (third round)
7. (France) Brice Leverdez (quarterfinals)
8. (Germany) Fabian Roth (quarterfinals)

=== Wild card ===
Badminton Europe (BEC) awarded a wild card entry to Toma Junior Popov of France.

=== Section 1 ===
First round
(France) L Corvée	21	21
(Portugal) B Atilano	6	11
(Czech Republic) M Ludík	21	21
(Hungary) G Krausz	9	14
(Sweden) H Hurskainen	21	21
(Azerbaijan) O Galandarov	5	9
(Scotland) K Merrilees	21	11	13
(Netherlands) M Caljouw	16	21	21

Second round
1	(Denmark) V Axelsen	22	21
(France) L Corvée	20	10
(Russia) V Malkov	21	21
(Czech Republic) M Ludík	19	10
6	(Spain) P Abián	21	18	17
(Sweden) H Hurskainen	12	21	12^{r}
(Cyprus) E Nicolaou	5	10
(Netherlands) M Caljouw	21	21

Third round
1	(Denmark) V Axelsen	21	21
(Russia) V Malkov	9	9
6	(Spain) P Abián	19	21	18
(Netherlands) M Caljouw	21	19	21

Quarterfinals
1	(Denmark) V Axelsen	21	21
(Netherlands) M Caljouw	17	14

=== Section 2 ===
First round
(England) T Penty	26	21
(Germany) K Schaefer	24	14
(Belgium) M Moreels	21	21
(Luxembourg) R Mann	9	7
(Republic of Ireland) S Evans	13	21	21
(Croatia) Z Durkinjak	21	17	17
(Romania) C Filimon	14	9
(Finland) E Heino	21	21

Second round
3	(Germany) M Zwiebler	21	21
(England) T Penty	10	15
(Lithuania) K Navickas	14	21	21
(Belgium) M Moreels	21	17	10
5	(Denmark) A Antonsen	21	21
(Republic of Ireland) S Evans	11	13
(Switzerland) M Bonny	14	14
(Finland) E Heino	21	21

Third round
3	(Germany) M Zwiebler	21	21
(Lithuania) K Navickas	16	14
5	(Denmark) A Antonsen	19	21	21
(Finland) E Heino	21	14	17

Quarterfinals
3	(Germany) M Zwiebler	19	18
5	(Denmark) A Antonsen	21	21

=== Section 3 ===
First round
(Greece) I Xanthou	14	16
(Austria) L Wraber	21	21
(Russia) S Sirant	21	21
(Turkey) E Lale	9	14
(Denmark) E Holst	21	21
(Sweden) F Burestedt	10	15
(Netherlands) N Fransman	21	20	15
(Finland) K Koljonen	11	22	21

Second round
(Austria) L Wraber	16	18
(Estonia) R Must	21	21
(Russia) S Sirant	18	21	18
7	(France) B Leverdez	21	16	21
(Denmark) E Holst	21	21
(Bulgaria) I Rusev	14	15
(Finland) K Koljonen	15	12
4	(Denmark) H-K Vittinghus	21	21

Third round
(Estonia) R Must	21	16	8
7	(France) B Leverdez	18	21	21
(Denmark) E Holst	22	13	17
4	(Denmark) H-K Vittinghus	20	21	21

Quarterfinals
7	(France) B Leverdez	10	19
4	(Denmark) H-K Vittinghus	21	21

=== Section 4 ===
First round
(Poland) M Rogalski	2^{r}
(Norway) M Myhre	1
WC	(France) T J Popov	21	18	21
(Ukraine) A Pochtarov	15	21	15
(Israel) M Zilberman	21	21
(Slovenia) A Roj	9	8
(France) L Claerbout	21	21
(Scotland) M Carder	8	16

Second round
(Norway) M Myhre	23	25
(Italy) R Maddaloni	21	23
WC	(France) T J Popov	12	17
8	(Germany) F Roth	21	21
(Israel) M Zilberman	21	21
(Slovakia) M Hlinican	11	11
(France) L Claerbout	12	9
2	(England) R Ouseph	21	21

Third round
(Norway) M Myhre	16	11
8	(Germany) F Roth	21	21
(Israel) M Zilberman	14	13
2	(England) R Ouseph	21	21

Quarterfinals
8	(Germany) F Roth	15	13
2	(England) R Ouseph	21	21

=== Finals ===
Quarterfinals
1	(Denmark) Viktor Axelsen	21	21
(Netherlands) Mark Caljouw	17	14
3	(Germany) Marc Zwiebler	19	18
5	(Denmark) Anders Antonsen	21	21
7	(France) Brice Leverdez	10	19
4	(Denmark) Hans-Kristian Vittinghus	21	21
8	(Germany) Fabian Roth	15	13
2	(England) Rajiv Ouseph	21	21

Semifinals
1	(Denmark) Viktor Axelsen	17	16
5	(Denmark) Anders Antonsen	21	21
4	(Denmark) Hans-Kristian Vittinghus	21	21	16
2	(England) Rajiv Ouseph	18	23	21

Final
5	(Denmark) Anders Antonsen	19	19
2	(England) Rajiv Ouseph	21	21

== Women's singles ==
=== Seeds ===
1. (Spain) Carolina Marín (champion)
2. (Spain) Beatriz Corrales (third round)
3. (Bulgaria) Linda Zetchiri (third round)
4. (Denmark) Line Kjaersfeldt (quarterfinals)
5. (Denmark) Mette Poulsen (semifinals)
6. (Switzerland) Sabrina Jaquet (semifinals)
7. (Scotland) Kirsty Gilmour (final)
8. (Denmark) Natalia Koch Rohde (quarterfinals)

=== Wild card ===
Badminton Europe (BEC) awarded a wild card entry to Yvonne Li of Germany.

=== Section 1 ===
First round
(Italy) L Iversen	11	6
(Turkey) Ö Bayrak	21	21
(England) C Birch	21	21
(Greece) I Karapetridou	3	9

Second round
1	(Spain) C Marín	21	21
(Wales) J Hart	9	10
(Ukraine) M Ulitina	15	11
(Turkey) Ö Bayrak	21	21
8	(Denmark) N K Rohde	21	21
(Latvia) I Pope	11	11
(Denmark) M Blichfeldt	21	3^{r}
(England) C Birch	12	8

Third round
1	(Spain) C Marín	21	24
(Turkey) Ö Bayrak	9	22
8	(Denmark) N K Rohde	21	21
(England) C Birch	12	11

Quarterfinals
1	(Spain) C Marín	21	21
8	(Denmark) N K Rohde	11	14

=== Section 2 ===
First round
(Hungary) A Korosi	21	21
(Lithuania) A Stapusaityte	19	13
(Finland) A Mikkela	23	12
WC	(Germany) Y Li	25	21
(Republic of Ireland) R Darragh	23	22
(Belgium) F Vandenhoucke	21	20

Second round
3	(Bulgaria) L Zetchiri	21	21
(Czech Republic) K Tomalova	12	15
(Russia) E Kosetskaya	21	21
(Hungary) A Korosi	10	7
5	(Denmark) M Poulsen	21	15	25
WC	(Germany) Y Li	12	21	23
(Germany) L Heim	21	21
(Republic of Ireland) R Darragh	12	11

Third round
3	(Bulgaria) L Zetchiri	15	21	18
(Russia) E Kosetskaya	21	15	21
5	(Denmark) M Poulsen	21	15	21
(Germany) L Heim	15	21	15

Quarterfinals
(Russia) E Kosetskaya	13	18
5	(Denmark) M Poulsen	21	21

=== Section 3 ===
First round
(Austria) E Baldauf	22	11
(Germany) F Deprez	24	21
(Slovakia) M Repiska	9	18
(Belarus) A Zaitsava	21	21
(Hungary) L Sarosi	20	14
(France) D Lansac	22	21

Second round
(Germany) F Deprez	21	21
(Russia) N Perminova	13	14
(Belarus) A Zaitsava	15	14
7	(Scotland) K Gilmour	21	21
(France) D Lansac	21	13	21
(Belgium) L Tan	12	21	13
(Turkey) N Yiğit	10	21	20
4	(Denmark) L Kjaersfeldt	21	13	22

Third round
(Germany) F Deprez	11	21	18
7	(Scotland) K Gilmour	21	19	21
(France) D Lansac	21	18	19
4	(Denmark) L Kjaersfeldt	18	21	21

Quarterfinals
7	(Scotland) K Gilmour	21	21
4	(Denmark) L Kjaersfeldt	9	17

=== Section 4 ===
First round
(Croatia) K Galenic	13	21	22
(Estonia) G Saar	21	19	24
(Armenia) L Poghosyan	11	11
(Finland) N Vainio	21	21
(Portugal) S Goncalves	21	21
(Norway) V Espeseth	8	14

Second round
(Estonia) G Saar	20	17
(Netherlands) G Mahulette	22	21
(Finland) N Vainio	15	11
6	(Switzerland) S Jaquet	21	21
(Portugal) S Goncalves	13	11
(England) F Chapman	21	21
(Bulgaria) M Mitsova	13	21	19
2	(Spain) B Corrales	21	14	21

Third round
(Netherlands) G Mahulette	9	13
6	(Switzerland) S Jaquet	21	21
(England) F Chapman	21	21
2	(Spain) B Corrales	13	19

Quarterfinals
6	(Switzerland) S Jaquet	21	20	21
(England) F Chapman	13	22	17

=== Finals ===
Quarterfinals
1	(Spain) Carolina Marín	21	21
8	(Denmark) Natalia Koch Rohde	11	14
(Russia) Evgeniya Kosetskaya	13	18
5	(Denmark) Mette Poulsen	21	21
7	(Scotland) Kirsty Gilmour	21	21
4	(Denmark) Line Kjaersfeldt	9	17
6	(Switzerland) Sabrina Jaquet	21	20	21
(England) Fontaine Mica Chapman	13	22	17

Semifinals
1	(Spain) Carolina Marín	21	21
5	(Denmark) Mette Poulsen	17	12
7	(Scotland) Kirsty Gilmour	22	21
6	(Switzerland) Sabrina Jaquet	20	10

Final
1	(Spain) Carolina Marín	21	21
7	(Scotland) Kirsty Gilmour	14	12

== Men's doubles ==
=== Seeds ===
1. (Denmark) Mathias Boe / Carsten Mogensen (champion)
2. (Denmark) Mads Conrad-Petersen / Mads Pieler Kolding (final)
3. (Denmark) Kim Astrup / Anders Skaarup Rasmussen (semifinals)
4. (Russia) Vladimir Ivanov / Ivan Sozonov (quarterfinals)
5. (England) Marcus Ellis / Chris Langridge (quarterfinals)
6. (Denmark) Mathias Christiansen / David Daugaard (semifinals)
7. (Germany) Jones Ralfy Jansen / Josche Zurwonne (quarterfinals)
8. (Belgium) Matijs Dierickx / Freek Golinski (quarterfinals)

=== Top half ===
First round

Second round

Quarterfinals

Semifinals

1
- (Denmark) M Boe
- (Denmark) C Mogensen
21
21

- (England) P Briggs
- (England) T Wolfenden
14
7

1
- (Denmark) M Boe
- (Denmark) C Mogensen
22
21

- (Switzerland) P Deschenaux
- (Switzerland) O Schaller
9
11

- (Poland) M Bochat
- (Poland) A Cwalina
20
16

- (Poland) M Bochat
- (Poland) A Cwalina
21
21

1
- (Denmark) M Boe
- (Denmark) C Mogensen
21
21

7
- (Germany) J R Jansen
- (Germany) J Zurwonne
15
21
21

7
- (Germany) J R Jansen
- (Germany) J Zurwonne
9
15

- (Russia) K Abramov
- (Russia) A Zinchenko
21
15
19

7
- (Germany) J R Jansen
- (Germany) J Zurwonne
10
21
21

- (France) B Kersaudy
- (France) J Maio
22
21

- (France) B Kersaudy
- (France) J Maio
21
15
15

- (Finland) H Aarnio
- (Finland) I Heino
20
16

1
- (Denmark) M Boe
- (Denmark) C Mogensen
21
21

4
- (Russia) V Ivanov
- (Russia) I Sozonov
21
21

6
- (Denmark) D Daugaard
- (Denmark) M Christiansen
10
15

- (Italy) L Osele
- (Italy) K Strobl
8
6

4
- (Russia) V Ivanov
- (Russia) I Sozonov
15
21
21

- (Republic of Ireland) J Magee
- (Republic of Ireland) S Magee
14
19

- (Croatia) Z Durkinjak
- (Croatia) Z Hoelbling
21
14
18

- (Croatia) Z Durkinjak
- (Croatia) Z Hoelbling
21
21

4
- (Russia) V Ivanov
- (Russia) I Sozonov
15
21
15

6
- (Denmark) D Daugaard
- (Denmark) M Christiansen
21
21

6
- (Denmark) D Daugaard
- (Denmark) M Christiansen
21
19
21

- (Estonia) K Kaljurand
- (Estonia) R Käsner
13
7

6
- (Denmark) D Daugaard
- (Denmark) M Christiansen
21
21

- (Netherlands) J Arends
- (Netherlands) R Jille
21
21

- (Netherlands) J Arends
- (Netherlands) R Jille
17
15

- (Austria) D Stipsits
- (Austria) R Zirnwald
17
8

=== Bottom half ===
First round

Second round

Quarterfinals

Semifinals

- (Italy) M Bellucci
- (Italy) F Caponio
6
9

- (Germany) R Beck
- (Germany) P Käsbauer
21
21

- (Germany) R Beck
- (Germany) P Käsbauer
20
17

- (Norway) F Kristensen
- (Norway) J Kristensen
19
8

8
- (Belgium) M Dierickx
- (Belgium) F Golinski
22
21

8
- (Belgium) M Dierickx
- (Belgium) F Golinski
21
21

8
- (Belgium) M Dierickx
- (Belgium) F Golinski
16
17

- (Ukraine) G Natarov
- (Ukraine) A Pochtarov
12
14

3
- (Denmark) A S Rasmussen
- (Denmark) K Astrup
21
21

- (Russia) E Dremin
- (Russia) D Grachev
21
21

- (Russia) E Dremin
- (Russia) D Grachev
21
12
12

- (Sweden) R Eidestedt
- (Sweden) N Ruponen
7
18

3
- (Denmark) A S Rasmussen
- (Denmark) K Astrup
16
21
21

3
- (Denmark) A S Rasmussen
- (Denmark) K Astrup
21
21

3
- (Denmark) A S Rasmussen
- (Denmark) K Astrup
17
22

- (Netherlands) J Maas
- (Netherlands) R Tabeling
21
21

2
- (Denmark) M P Kolding
- (Denmark) M C Petersen
21
24

- (England) B Lane
- (England) S Vendy
13
14

- (Netherlands) J Maas
- (Netherlands) R Tabeling
10
22
17

- (Bulgaria) D Nikolov
- (Bulgaria) I Rusev
16
15

5
- (England) M Ellis
- (England) C Langridge
21
20
21

5
- (England) M Ellis
- (England) C Langridge
21
21

5
- (England) M Ellis
- (England) C Langridge
21
15
21

- (Germany) M Lamsfuß
- (Germany) M E Seidel
21
21

2
- (Denmark) M P Kolding
- (Denmark) M C Petersen
19
21
23

- (France) V Heriau
- (France) F Riancho
14
19

- (Germany) M Lamsfuß
- (Germany) M E Seidel
14
15

- (Scotland) M Campbell
- (Scotland) P MacHugh
12
14

2
- (Denmark) M P Kolding
- (Denmark) M C Petersen
21
21

2
- (Denmark) M P Kolding
- (Denmark) M C Petersen
21
21

=== Finals ===
Semifinals

Final

1
- (Denmark) Mathias Boe
- (Denmark) Carsten Mogensen
21
21

6
- (Denmark) David Daugaard
- (Denmark) Mathias Christiansen
10
15

1
- (Denmark) Mathias Boe
- (Denmark) Carsten Mogensen
21
22

2
- (Denmark) Mads Pieler Kolding
- (Denmark) Mads Conrad-Petersen
16
20

7
- (Denmark) Anders Skaarup Rasmussen
- (Denmark) Kim Astrup
17
22

2
- (Denmark) Mads Pieler Kolding
- (Denmark) Mads Conrad-Petersen
21
24

== Women's doubles ==
=== Seeds ===
1. (Denmark) Kamilla Rytter Juhl / Christinna Pedersen (champion)
2. (Bulgaria) Gabriela Stoeva / Stefani Stoeva (final)
3. (Denmark) Maiken Fruergaard / Sara Thygesen (quarterfinals)
4. (Russia) Anastasia Chervyakova / Olga Morozova (semifinals)
5. (Netherlands) Eefje Muskens / Selena Piek (quarterfinals)
6. (Denmark) Julie Finne-Ipsen / Rikke Søby (quarterfinals)
7. (England) Lauren Smith / Sarah Walker (semifinals)
8. (Bulgaria) Mariya Mitsova / Petya Nedelcheva (quarterfinals)

=== Top half ===
First round

Second round

Quarterfinals

Semifinals

1
- (Denmark) C Pedersen
- (Denmark) K R Juhl
21
21

- (Scotland) J MacPherson
- (Scotland) E O'Donnell
13
8

1
- (Denmark) C Pedersen
- (Denmark) K R Juhl
21
21

- (Turkey) Ö Bayrak
- (Turkey) N Yiğit
21
21

- (Turkey) Ö Bayrak
- (Turkey) N Yiğit
14
17

- (Norway) S F Jorgensen
- (Norway) N Syvertsen
7
8

1
- (Denmark) C Pedersen
- (Denmark) K R Juhl
21
21

8
- (Bulgaria) M Mitsova
- (Bulgaria) P Nedelcheva
19
21
21

8
- (Bulgaria) M Mitsova
- (Bulgaria) P Nedelcheva
17
9

- (Ukraine) N Voytsekh
- (Ukraine) Y Zharka
21
7
10

8
- (Bulgaria) M Mitsova
- (Bulgaria) P Nedelcheva
21
21

- (England) J Moore
- (England) V Williams
21
21

- (England) J Moore
- (England) V Williams
16
16

- (Spain) L Oset
- (Spain) L Usle
11
18

1
- (Denmark) C Pedersen
- (Denmark) K R Juhl
21
21

4
- (Russia) O Morozova
- (Russia) A Chervyakova
21
21

4
- (Russia) O Morozova
- (Russia) A Chervyakova
10
13

- (Germany) J Goliszewski
- (Germany) L Kaepplein
16
19

4
- (Russia) O Morozova
- (Russia) A Chervyakova
21
21

- (Czech Republic) T Švábíková
- (Czech Republic) K Tomalova
19
21
21

- (Czech Republic) T Švábíková
- (Czech Republic) K Tomalova
9
9

- (Latvia) L Lencevica
21
11
9

4
- (Russia) O Morozova
- (Russia) A Chervyakova
19
21
21

5
- (Netherlands) E Muskens
- (Netherlands) S Piek
19
21
21

5
- (Netherlands) E Muskens
- (Netherlands) S Piek
21
16
14

- (France) D Delrue
- (France) L Palermo
21
13
16

5
- (Netherlands) E Muskens
- (Netherlands) S Piek
21
21

- (France) L Baumann
- (France) A Fontaine
21
21

- (France) L Baumann
- (France) A Fontaine
10
11

- (Belarus) A Cherniavskaya
17
18

=== Bottom half ===
First round

Second round

Quarterfinals

Semifinals

- (Finland) J Nyström
21
21

- (Republic of Ireland) S Boyle
- (Republic of Ireland) R Darragh
15
13

- (Finland) J Nyström
19
18

- (France) É Lefel
- (France) A Tran
24
19
18

7
- (England) L Smith
- (England) S Walker
21
21

7
- (England) L Smith
- (England) S Walker
22
21
21

7
- (England) L Smith
- (England) S Walker
22
24

- (Netherlands) C Seinen
- (Netherlands) I Tabeling
17
21
23

3
- (Denmark) M Fruergaard
- (Denmark) S Thygesen
20
22

- (Sweden) C Nistad
- (Sweden) E Wengberg
21
14
21

- (Netherlands) C Seinen
- (Netherlands) I Tabeling
11
21
8

- (Portugal) S Gonçalves
- (Portugal) H Pestana
13
8

3
- (Denmark) M Fruergaard
- (Denmark) S Thygesen
21
18
21

3
- (Denmark) M Fruergaard
- (Denmark) S Thygesen
21
21

7
- (England) L Smith
- (England) S Walker
15
15

- (Italy) S Garino
- (Italy) L Iversen
21
12
22

2
- (Bulgaria) G Stoeva
- (Bulgaria) S Stoeva
21
21

- (Hungary) A Kőrösi
- (Hungary) O Varga
16
21
20

- (Italy) S Garino
- (Italy) L Iversen
4
7

- (Russia) E Bolotova
- (Russia) A Davletova
23
19

6
- (Denmark) R Søby
- (Denmark) J F Ipsen
21
21

6
- (Denmark) R Søby
- (Denmark) J F Ipsen
25
21

6
- (Denmark) R Søby
- (Denmark) J F Ipsen
21
10
14

- (Lithuania) V Fomkinaite
- (Lithuania) G Voitechovskaja
14
10

2
- (Bulgaria) G Stoeva
- (Bulgaria) S Stoeva
19
21
21

- (Germany) I Herttrich
- (Germany) C Nelte
21
21

- (Germany) I Herttrich
- (Germany) C Nelte
21
22
15

- (Estonia) K Kuuba
- (Estonia) H Rüütel
16
19

2
- (Bulgaria) G Stoeva
- (Bulgaria) S Stoeva
23
20
21

2
- (Bulgaria) G Stoeva
- (Bulgaria) S Stoeva
21
21

=== Finals ===
Semifinals

Final

1
- (Denmark) Christinna Pedersen
- (Denmark) Kamilla Rytter Juhl
21
21

4
- (Russia) Olga Morozova
- (Russia) Anastasia Chervyakova
10
13

1
- (Denmark) Christinna Pedersen
- (Denmark) Kamilla Rytter Juhl
21
15
21

2
- (Bulgaria) Gabriela Stoeva
- (Bulgaria) Stefani Stoeva
11
21
11

7
- (England) Lauren Smith
- (England) Sarah Walker
15
15

2
- (Bulgaria) Gabriela Stoeva
- (Bulgaria) Stefani Stoeva
21
21

== Mixed doubles ==
=== Seeds ===
1. (Denmark) Joachim Fischer Nielsen / Christinna Pedersen (final)
2. (England) Chris Adcock / Gabrielle Adcock (champion)
3. (Denmark) Mathias Christiansen / Sara Thygesen (quarterfinals)
4. (Poland) Robert Mateusiak / Nadiezda Zieba (quarterfinals)
5. (Netherlands) Jacco Arends / Selena Piek (first round)
6. (Russia) Evgenij Dremin / Evgenia Dimova (quarterfinals)
7. (Russia) Vitalij Durkin / Nina Vislova (second round)
8. (Sweden) Nico Ruponen / Amanda Hogstrom (quarterfinals)

=== Wild card ===
Badminton Europe (BEC) awarded a wild card entry to Søren Gravholt and Maiken Fruergaard of Denmark.

=== Top half ===
First round

Second round

Quarterfinals

Semifinals

1
- (Denmark) C Pedersen
- (Denmark) J F Nielsen
21
21

- (England) B Lane
- (England) J Pugh
14
17

1
- (Denmark) C Pedersen
- (Denmark) J F Nielsen
21
21

- (Belarus) U Varantsou
- (Belarus) K Silich

- (Scotland) M Campbell
- (Scotland) J MacPherson
15
13

- (Scotland) M Campbell
- (Scotland) J MacPherson
w
/
o

1
- (Denmark) C Pedersen
- (Denmark) J F Nielsen
21
21

6
- (Russia) E Dremin
- (Russia) E Dimova
21
21

6
- (Russia) E Dremin
- (Russia) E Dimova
12
12

- (Belgium) E Bracke
- (Belgium) L Jaques
14
14

6
- (Russia) E Dremin
- (Russia) E Dimova
19
21
21

- (Germany) M Lamsfuß
- (Germany) I Herttrich
21
21

- (Germany) M Lamsfuß
- (Germany) I Herttrich
21
12
17

- (Norway) F Kristensen
- (Norway) S F Jørgensen
7
16

1
- (Denmark) C Pedersen
- (Denmark) J F Nielsen
21
21

4
- (Poland) R Mateusiak
- (Poland) N Zięba
21
21

- (Republic of Ireland) S Magee
- (Republic of Ireland) C Magee
14
10

- (Spain) A Zapico
- (Spain) L Uslé
10
13

4
- (Poland) R Mateusiak
- (Poland) N Zięba
21
16
21

- (England) G Mairs
- (England) J Moore
19
12

- (Finland) A Kaisti
- (Finland) J Nyström
19
21
13

- (Finland) A Kaisti
- (Finland) J Nyström
21
21

4
- (Poland) R Mateusiak
- (Poland) N Zięba
20
21
12

5
- (Netherlands) J Arends
- (Netherlands) S Piek
17
21

- (Republic of Ireland) S Magee
- (Republic of Ireland) C Magee
22
17
21

- (Republic of Ireland) S Magee
- (Republic of Ireland) C Magee
21
23

- (Republic of Ireland) S Magee
- (Republic of Ireland) C Magee
19
21
21

- (Lithuania) P Bartušis
- (Lithuania) V Fomkinaite
11
14

- (France) B Kersaudy
- (France) L Palermo
21
16
15

- (France) B Kersaudy
- (France) L Palermo
21
21

=== Bottom half ===
First round

Second round

Quarterfinals

Semifinals

- (Bulgaria) L Mihaylov
- (Bulgaria) P Nedelcheva
12
14

- (France) R Labar
- (France) A Fontaine
21
21

- (France) R Labar
- (France) A Fontaine
21
21

- (Cyprus) K Pissis
- (Greece) I Karapetridou
5
6

7
- (Russia) V Durkin
- (Russia) N Vislova
13
13

7
- (Russia) V Durkin
- (Russia) N Vislova
21
21

- (France) R Labar
- (France) A Fontaine
21
8
22

- (Ukraine) G Natarov
- (Ukraine) N Voytsekh
15
13

3
- (Denmark) M Christiansen
- (Denmark) S Thygesen
19
21
20

- (Poland) P Pietryja
- (Poland) A Wojtkowska
21
21

- (Poland) P Pietryja
- (Poland) A Wojtkowska
6
11

- (Germany) M E Seidel
- (Germany) L Efler
6
17

3
- (Denmark) M Christiansen
- (Denmark) S Thygesen
21
21

3
- (Denmark) M Christiansen
- (Denmark) S Thygesen
21
21

- (France) R Labar
- (France) A Fontaine
14
13

- (Czech Republic) J Bitman
- (Czech Republic) A Basova
13
17

2
- (England) C Adcock
- (England) G Adcock
21
21

WC
- (Denmark) S Gravholt
- (Denmark) M Fruergaard
21
21

WC
- (Denmark) S Gravholt
- (Denmark) M Fruergaard
17
15

- (France) J Corvee
- (France) A Tran
19
21
12

8
- (Sweden) N Ruponen
- (Sweden) A Hogstrom
21
21

8
- (Sweden) N Ruponen
- (Sweden) A Hogstrom
21
12
21

8
- (Sweden) N Ruponen
- (Sweden) A Hogstrom
17
12

- (Estonia) R Käsner
- (Estonia) H Rüütel
13
19

2
- (England) C Adcock
- (England) G Adcock
21
21

- (Netherlands) R Jille
- (Netherlands) I Tabeling
21
21

- (Netherlands) R Jille
- (Netherlands) I Tabeling
9
13

- (Switzerland) O Schaller
- (Switzerland) C Burkart
10
5

2
- (England) C Adcock
- (England) G Adcock
21
21

2
- (England) C Adcock
- (England) G Adcock
21
21

=== Finals ===
Semifinals

Final

1
- (Denmark) Christinna Pedersen
- (Denmark) Joachim Fischer Nielsen
21
21

- (Republic of Ireland) Sam Magee
- (Republic of Ireland) Chloe Magee
14
10

1
- (Denmark) Joachim Fischer Nielsen
- (Denmark) Christinna Pedersen
17
21
19

2
- (England) Chris Adcock
- (England) Gabrielle Adcock
21
18
21

- (France) Ronan Labar
- (France) Audrey Fontaine
14
13

2
- (England) Chris Adcock
- (England) Gabrielle Adcock
21
21
