= 2017 European Mixed Team Badminton Championships =

Tournament details
- Dates: 15–19 February 2017
- Location: Lubin, Poland

The 2017 European Mixed Team Badminton Championships was held in Lubin, Poland, between 15–19 February 2017 and organised by Badminton Europe and Polish Badminton Federation. Denmark, the defending champion, retained their title after defeating Russia by 3-0 in the final.

== Qualification ==
Seven highest ranked countries, including Poland as host, qualified directly to the championship. The remaining countries were divided to five groups where the winner of each group will occupy the remaining five spots.

=== Direct qualifiers ===
- Denmark
- England
- Germany
- Russia
- Netherlands
- Spain
- Poland (host country)

=== Qualification stage ===
The qualification stage was held between 11–13 November 2016 in 5 cities across Europe. France, Bulgaria, Ireland, Switzerland, and Sweden qualified to the main events.

Group	Host City	Qualified team	Teams failed to qualify
1	(Czech Republic) Karviná	France	Czech Republic; Israel; Luxembourg
2	(Bulgaria) Sofia	Bulgaria	Estonia; Faroe Islands; Lithuania
3	(Republic of Ireland) Dublin	Ireland	Austria; Hungary; Norway
4	(Slovenia) Medvode	Switzerland	Latvia; Scotland; Slovenia
5	(Sweden) Uppsala	Sweden	Finland; Portugal; Slovakia

== Group stage ==
=== Group 1 ===
Pos	Team	Pld	W	L	MF	MA	MD	GF	GA	GD	PF	PA	PD	Pts	Qualification
1	Denmark	2	2	0	9	1	+8	18	2	+16	399	235	+164	2	Knockout stage
2	France	2	1	1	4	6	−2	9	13	−4	341	404	−63	1	Knockout stage
3	Bulgaria	2	0	2	2	8	−6	5	17	−12	308	409	−101	0	

Source: BWF

==== France vs Bulgaria ====
France
4
RCS Arena, Court 2
15 February 2017, 10:00

Bulgaria
1

			1	2	3
1	(France) (Bulgaria)	Ronan Labar / Audrey Mittelheisser; Philip Shishov / Gabriela Stoeva	21; 16	21; 19
2	(France) (Bulgaria)	Brice Leverdez; Ivan Rusev	13; 21	21; 14	21; 16
3	(France) (Bulgaria)	Delphine Lansac; Linda Zetchiri	21; 11	21; 17
4	(France) (Bulgaria)	Bastian Kersaudy / Julien Maio; Ivan Rusev / Philip Shishov	21; 11	21; 12
5	(France) (Bulgaria)	Émilie Lefel / Anne Tran; Gabriela Stoeva / Stefani Stoeva	21; 15	8; 21	10; 21

==== Denmark vs Bulgaria ====
Denmark
4
RCS Arena, Court 1
15 February 2017, 19:00

Bulgaria
1

			1	2	3
1	(Denmark) (Bulgaria)	Anders Antonsen; Philip Shishov	21; 8	21; 11
2	(Denmark) (Bulgaria)	Line Kjærsfeldt; Mariya Mitsova	21; 13	16; 21	22; 24
3	(Denmark) (Bulgaria)	Mathias Boe / Carsten Mogensen; Ivan Rusev / Philip Shishov	21; 3	21; 3
4	(Denmark) (Bulgaria)	Christinna Pedersen / Kamilla Rytter Juhl; Mariya Mitsova / Petya Nedelcheva	21; 18	21; 13
5	(Denmark) (Bulgaria)	Mathias Christiansen / Sara Thygesen; Ivan Rusev / Stefani Stoeva	4; 0			retired

==== Denmark vs France ====
Denmark
5
RCS Arena, Court 2
16 Februar 2017, 14:30

France
0

			1	2	3
1	(Denmark) (France)	Natalia Koch Rohde; Marie Batomene	21; 18	21; 5
2	(Denmark) (France)	Viktor Axelsen; Lucas Corvée	21; 16	21; 3
3	(Denmark) (France)	Christinna Pedersen / Kamilla Rytter Juhl; Émilie Lefel / Anne Tran	21; 10	21; 9
4	(Denmark) (France)	Mathias Boe / Carsten Mogensen; Thom Gicquel / Ronan Labar	21; 12	21; 17
5	(Denmark) (France)	Joachim Fischer Nielsen / Christinna Pedersen; Bastian Kersaudy / Léa Palermo	21; 13	21; 18

=== Group 2 ===
Pos	Team	Pld	W	L	MF	MA	MD	GF	GA	GD	PF	PA	PD	Pts	Qualification
1	England	2	2	0	8	2	+6	18	4	+14	444	330	+114	2	Knockout stage
2	Sweden	2	1	1	6	4	+2	11	12	−1	403	414	−11	1	Knockout stage
3	Ireland	2	0	2	1	9	−8	4	17	−13	308	411	−103	0	

Source: BWF

==== Ireland vs Sweden ====
Ireland
1
RCS Arena, Court 1
15 February 2017, 10:00

Sweden
4

			1	2	3
1	(Republic of Ireland) (Sweden)	Scott Evans; Henri Hurskainen	21; 15	15; 21	19; 21
2	(Republic of Ireland) (Sweden)	Chloe Magee; Emma Karlsson	14; 21	14; 21
3	(Republic of Ireland) (Sweden)	Joshua Magee / Sam Magee; Richard Eidestedt / Nico Ruponen	19; 21	21; 16	24; 22
4	(Republic of Ireland) (Sweden)	Sara Boyle / Rachael Darragh; Clara Nistad / Emma Wengberg	14; 21	17; 21
5	(Republic of Ireland) (Sweden)	Sam Magee / Chloe Magee; Nico Ruponen / Amanda Högström	2; 1			retired

==== England vs Ireland ====
England
5
RCS Arena, Court 2
15 February 2017, 19:00

Ireland
0

			1	2	3
1	(England) (Republic of Ireland)	Toby Penty; Nhat Nguyen	21; 18	21; 17
2	(England) (Republic of Ireland)	Fontaine Wright; Rachael Darragh	21; 14	21; 8
3	(England) (Republic of Ireland)	Marcus Ellis / Chris Langridge; Joshua Magee / Nhat Nguyen	21; 9	21; 12
4	(England) (Republic of Ireland)	Lauren Smith / Sarah Walker; Sara Boyle / Sinead Chambers	21; 9	21; 10
5	(England) (Republic of Ireland)	Chris Adcock / Gabrielle Adcock; Scott Evans / Chloe Magee	21; 15	21; 16

==== England vs Sweden ====
England
3
RCS Arena, Court 1
16 February 2017, 14:30

Sweden
2

			1	2	3
1	(England) (Sweden)	Toby Penty; Henri Hurskainen	15; 21	22; 20	13; 21
2	(England) (Sweden)	Fontaine Wright; Emma Karlsson	21; 12	21; 10
3	(England) (Sweden)	Marcus Ellis / Chris Langridge; Richard Eidestedt / Nico Ruponen	21; 11	21; 18
4	(England) (Sweden)	Lauren Smith / Sarah Walker; Clara Nistad / Emma Wengberg	20; 22	21; 9	17; 21
5	(England) (Sweden)	Chris Adcock / Gabrielle Adcock; Nico Ruponen / Amanda Högström	21; 19	21; 18

=== Group 3 ===
Pos	Team	Pld	W	L	MF	MA	MD	GF	GA	GD	PF	PA	PD	Pts	Qualification
1	Germany	2	2	0	8	2	+6	16	6	+10	450	343	+107	2	Knockout stage
2	Netherlands	2	1	1	5	5	0	12	10	+2	383	400	−17	1	Knockout stage
3	Switzerland	2	0	2	2	8	−6	5	17	−12	350	440	−90	0	

Source: BWF

==== Germany vs Switzerland ====
Germany
4
RCS Arena, Court 1
15 February 2017, 14:30

Switzerland
1

			1	2	3
1	(Germany) (Switzerland)	Mark Lamsfuß / Isabel Herttrich; Oliver Schaller / Céline Burkart	21; 14	21; 19
2	(Germany) (Switzerland)	Marc Zwiebler; Mathias Bonny	21; 12	21; 16
3	(Germany) (Switzerland)	Luise Heim; Sabrina Jaquet	22; 24	13; 21
4	(Germany) (Switzerland)	Raphael Beck / Josche Zurwonne; Mathias Bonny / Oliver Schaller	21; 15	20; 22	21; 11
5	(Germany) (Switzerland)	Johanna Goliszewski / Carla Nelte; Céline Burkart / Sabrina Jaquet	21; 13	21; 10

==== Switzerland vs Netherlands ====
Switzerland
1
RCS Arena, Court 2
16 February 2017, 10:00

Netherlands
4

			1	2	3
1	(Switzerland) (Netherlands)	Oliver Schaller / Céline Burkart; Ruben Jille / Cheryl Seinen	15; 21	19; 21
2	(Switzerland) (Netherlands)	Mathias Bonny; Mark Caljouw	11; 21	15; 21
3	(Switzerland) (Netherlands)	Sabrina Jaquet; Gayle Mahulette	15; 21	21; 15	21; 13
4	(Switzerland) (Netherlands)	Mathias Bonny / Oliver Schaller; Jelle Maas / Robin Tabeling	14; 21	17; 21
5	(Switzerland) (Netherlands)	Ayla Huser / Sabrina Jaquet; Cheryl Seinen / Iris Tabeling	15; 21	10; 21

==== Germany vs Netherlands ====
Germany
4
RCS Arena, Court 1
16 February 2017, 19:00

Netherlands
1

			1	2	3
1	(Germany) (Netherlands)	Fabienne Deprez; Gayle Mahulette	21; 13	21; 18
2	(Germany) (Netherlands)	Fabian Roth; Mark Caljouw	20; 22	20; 22
3	(Germany) (Netherlands)	Carla Nelte / Isabel Herttrich; Cheryl Seinen / Iris Tabeling	21; 14	21; 11
4	(Germany) (Netherlands)	Peter Käsbauer / Josche Zurwonne; Jacco Arends / Ruben Jille	19; 21	21; 13	21; 8
5	(Germany) (Netherlands)	Mark Lamsfuß / Isabel Herttrich; Robin Tabeling / Cheryl Seinen	21; 12	21; 12

=== Group 4 ===
Pos	Team	Pld	W	L	MF	MA	MD	GF	GA	GD	PF	PA	PD	Pts	Qualification
1	Russia	2	2	0	9	1	+8	18	3	+15	426	308	+118	2	Knockout stage
2	Poland (H)	2	1	1	3	7	−4	8	14	−6	355	415	−60	1	Knockout stage
3	Spain	2	0	2	3	7	−4	6	15	−9	332	390	−58	0	

Source: BWF
(H) Host

==== Poland vs Spain ====
Poland
3
RCS Arena, Court 2
15 February 2017, 14:30

Spain
2

			1	2	3
1	(Poland) (Spain)	Michał Łogosz; Pablo Abián	21; 19	9; 21	14; 21
2	(Poland) (Spain)	Wiktoria Dąbczyńska; Carolina Marín	9; 21	10; 21
3	(Poland) (Spain)	Adam Cwalina / Paweł Pietryja; Luís Enrique Peñalver / Alberto Zapico	21; 11	21; 13
4	(Poland) (Spain)	Agnieszka Wojtkowska / Aneta Wojtkowska; Clara Azurmendi / Beatriz Corrales	21; 19	24; 22
5	(Poland) (Spain)	Robert Mateusiak / Nadieżda Zięba; Ernesto Velázquez / Haideé Ojeda	21; 5	21; 14

==== Russia vs Spain ====
Russia
4
RCS Arena, Court 1
16 February 2017, 10:00

Spain
1

			1	2	3
1	(Russia) (Spain)	Ivan Sozonov / Nina Vislova; Pablo Abián / Haideé Ojeda	21; 15	21; 13
2	(Russia) (Spain)	Vladimir Malkov; Luís Enrique Peñalver	21; 19	21; 10
3	(Russia) (Spain)	Evgeniya Kosetskaya; Beatriz Corrales	14; 21	16; 21
4	(Russia) (Spain)	Vladimir Ivanov / Ivan Sozonov; Ernesto Velázquez / Alberto Zapico	21; 11	21; 4
5	(Russia) (Spain)	Ekaterina Bolotova / Anastasia Chervyakova; Clara Azurmendi / Haideé Ojeda	21; 12	21; 19

==== Russia vs Poland ====
Russia
5
RCS Arena, Court 2
16 February 2017, 19:00

Poland
0

			1	2	3
1	(Russia) (Poland)	Sergey Sirant; Mateusz Dubowski	18; 21	21; 14	21; 19
2	(Russia) (Poland)	Natalia Perminova; Wiktoria Dąbczyńska	21; 10	21; 12
3	(Russia) (Poland)	Ivan Sozonov / Vladimir Ivanov; Adam Cwalina / Paweł Pietryja	21; 14	21; 15
4	(Russia) (Poland)	Olga Morozova / Anastasia Chervyakova; Kornelia Marczak / Magdalena Witek	21; 13	21; 11
5	(Russia) (Poland)	Vladimir Ivanov / Ekaterina Bolotova; Paweł Pietryja / Aneta Wojtkowska	21; 15	21; 19

== Knockout stage ==
Quarter-finals
17 February
Denmark	3
Sweden	0
17 February
Germany	3
Poland	1
17 February
France	1
Russia	3
17 February
Netherlands	2
England	3

Semi-finals
18 February
Denmark	3
Germany	1
18 February
Russia	3
England	1

Final
19 February
Denmark	3
Russia	0

=== Quarterfinals ===
France
1
Report
17 February 2017

Russia
3

			1	2	3
1	(France) (Russia)	Ronan Labar / Audrey Fontaine; Vladimir Ivanov / Ekaterina Bolotova	21; 18	9; 21	18; 21
2	(France) (Russia)	Brice Leverdez; Anatoliy Yartsev	20; 22	21; 11	21; 15
3	(France) (Russia)	Delphine Lansac; Evgeniya Kosetskaya	21; 15	16; 21	18; 21
4	(France) (Russia)	Bastian Kersaudy / Julien Maio; Vladimir Ivanov / Ivan Sozonov	18; 21	9; 21
5	(France) (Russia)	Emilie Lefel / Anne Tran; Ekaterina Bolotova / Anastasia Chervyakova				not played

Netherlands
2
Report
17 February 2017

England
3

			1	2	3
1	(Netherlands) (England)	Gayle Mahulette; Fontaine Mica Chapman	11; 21	21; 19	21; 17
2	(Netherlands) (England)	Mark Caljouw; Toby Penty	21; 19	22; 24	21; 18
3	(Netherlands) (England)	Iris Tabeling / Cheryl Seinen; Lauren Smith / Sarah Walker	18; 21	13; 21
4	(Netherlands) (England)	Jelle Maas / Robin Tabeling; Marcus Ellis / Chris Langridge	13; 21	16; 21
5	(Netherlands) (England)	Ruben Jille / Cheryl Seinen; Chris Adcock / Gabrielle Adcock	13; 21	18; 21

Germany
3
Report
17 February 2017

Poland
1

			1	2	3
1	(Germany) (Poland)	Marc Zwiebler; Michal Rogalski	21; 19	21; 14
2	(Germany) (Poland)	Fabienne Deprez; Wiktoria Dabczynska	21; 12	21; 18
3	(Germany) (Poland)	Josche Zurwonne / Peter Kaesbauer; Robert Mateusiak / Adam Cwalina	23; 25	17; 21
4	(Germany) (Poland)	Carla Nelte / Johanna Goliszewski; Agnieszka Wojtkowska / Aneta Wojtkowska	22; 20	21; 9
5	(Germany) (Poland)	Mark Lamsfuss / Isabel Herttrich; Robert Mateusiak / Nadiezda Zieba				not played

Denmark
3
Report
17 February 2017

Sweden
0

			1	2	3
1	(Denmark) (Sweden)	Joachim Fischer Nielsen / Christinna Pedersen; Nico Ruponen / Amanda Hogstrom	21; 13	21; 12
2	(Denmark) (Sweden)	Viktor Axelsen; Henri Hurskainen	21; 11	21; 14
3	(Denmark) (Sweden)	Line Kjaersfeldt; Emma Karlsson	19; 21	10; 1		retired
4	(Denmark) (Sweden)	Mathias Boe / Carsten Mogensen; Nico Ruponen / Richard Eidestedt				not played
5	(Denmark) (Sweden)	Kamilla Rytter Juhl / Christinna Pedersen; Emma Wengberg / Clara Nistad				not played

=== Semifinals ===
Russia
3
Report
18 February 2017

England
1

			1	2	3
1	(Russia) (England)	Vladimir Ivanov / Ekaterina Bolotova; Chris Adcock / Gabrielle Adcock	23; 21	23; 21
2	(Russia) (England)	Anatoliy Yartsev; Toby Penty	16; 21	16; 21
3	(Russia) (England)	Evgeniya Kosetskaya; Chloe Birch	21; 16	13; 21	21; 12
4	(Russia) (England)	Vladimir Ivanov / Ivan Sozonov; Marcus Ellis / Chris Langridge	18; 21	21; 17	21; 18
5	(Russia) (England)	Ekaterina Bolotova / Anastasia Chervyakova; Lauren Smith / Sarah Walker				not played

Denmark
3
Report
18 February 2017

Germany
1

			1	2	3
1	(Denmark) (Germany)	Joachim Fischer Nielsen / Christinna Pedersen; Mark Lamsfuss / Isabel Herttrich	21; 12	21; 17
2	(Denmark) (Germany)	Viktor Axelsen; Fabian Roth	18; 21	21; 10	18; 21
3	(Denmark) (Germany)	Line Kjaersfeldt; Fabienne Deprez	14; 21	21; 11	21; 7
4	(Denmark) (Germany)	Mathias Boe / Carsten Mogensen; Mark Lamsfuss / Josche Zurwonne	21; 17	21; 13
5	(Denmark) (Germany)	Kamilla Rytter Juhl / Christinna Pedersen; Isabel Herttrich / Carla Nelte				not played

=== Final ===
Denmark
3
Report
19 February 2017

Russia
0

			1	2	3
1	(Denmark) (Russia)	Joachim Fischer Nielsen / Christinna Pedersen; Ivan Sozonov / Ekaterina Bolotova	24; 22	21; 10
2	(Denmark) (Russia)	Anders Antonsen; Anatoliy Yartsev	21; 7	21; 8
3	(Denmark) (Russia)	Line Kjaersfeldt; Evgeniya Kosetskaya	21; 15	21; 15
4	(Denmark) (Russia)	Mathias Boe / Carsten Mogensen; Evgenij Dremin / Ivan Sozonov				not played
5	(Denmark) (Russia)	Kamilla Rytter Juhl / Christinna Pedersen; Anastasia Chervyakova / Olga Morozova				not played
