= Hellas Open =

The Hellas Open in badminton is an international open held in Greece since 2016 and are thereby one of the most recent international championships in Europe.

== Previous winners ==
The table below gives an overview of the winners at the tournament.

Year	Men's singles	Women's singles	Men's doubles	Women's doubles	Mixed doubles
2016	(Denmark) Kim Bruun	(Germany) Fabienne Deprez	(Poland) Miłosz Bochat (Poland) Paweł Pietryja	(Finland) Jenny Nyström (Finland) Sonja Pekkola	(Poland) Paweł Pietryja (Poland) Aneta Wojtkowska
2017	(Denmark) Kim Bruun	(Turkey) Neslihan Yiğit	(Denmark) Kasper Antonsen (Denmark) Niclas Nøhr	(Turkey) Özge Bayrak (Turkey) Cemre Fere	(India) Rohan Kapoor (India) Kuhoo Garg
2018	(Poland) Adrian Dziółko	(Germany) Luise Heim	(India) Arjun M.R. (India) Ramchandran Shlok	(India) Rutaparna Panda (India) Arathi Sara Sunil	(India) Arjun M.R. (India) K. Maneesha
2019	(Malaysia) Lim Chong King	(Malaysia) Kisona Selvaduray	(France) Éloi Adam (France) Julien Maio	(France) Vimala Hériau (France) Margot Lambert	(France) Fabien Delrue (France) Vimala Hériau

== Performances by nation ==
Top Nations
Pos	Nation	MS	WS	MD	WD	XD	Total
1	India			1	1	2	4
2	Denmark	2		1			3
2	France			1	1	1	3
2	Poland	1		1		1	3
5	Germany		2				2
5	Malaysia	1	1				2
5	Turkey		1		1		2
8	Finland				1		1
Total		4	4	4	4	4	20
