= Ilya Zhdanov =

Russian badminton player (born 1990)

Ilya Zhdanov Илья Жданов
Personal information
- Born: Ilya Vladimirovich Zhdanov (Илья Владимирович Жданов); 21 September 1990 (age 35) Orekhovo-Zuyevo, Moscow, Russian SFSR, Soviet Union
- Height: 1.80 m (5 ft 11 in)
- Weight: 70 kg (154 lb)

Sport
- Country: Russia
- Sport: Badminton
- Handedness: Right
- Coached by: Natalia Rusina

Men's singles & doubles
- Highest ranking: 453 (MS, 16 August 2012); 99 (MD, 23 July 2015); 153 (XD, 28 April 2016)
- BWF profile

Ilya Vladimirovich Zhdanov (Russian: Илья Владимирович Жданов; born 21 September 1990) is a Russian badminton player.

== Achievements ==
=== BWF International Challenge/Series ===
Men's doubles

Year	Tournament	Partner	Opponent	Score	Result
2015	Hellas International	(Russia) Vladimir Rusin	(Poland) Miłosz Bochat (Poland) Paweł Pietryja	21–13, 22–24, 13–21	(silver) Runner-up

Mixed doubles

Year	Tournament	Partner	Opponent	Score	Result
2015	Hellas International	(Russia) Tatjana Bibik	(Poland) Paweł Pietryja (Poland) Aneta Wojtkowska	21–10, 28–26	(gold) Winner

BWF International Challenge tournament
BWF International Series tournament
BWF Future Series tournament
