= Sam Parsons =

English badminton player (born 1995)

Personal information
- Born: 23 August 1995 (age 31) Coventry, England
- Height: 1.76 m (5 ft 9 in)

Sport
- Country: England
- Sport: Badminton
- Handedness: Right
- Coached by: Steve Butler

Men's singles & doubles
- Highest ranking: 61 (MS 21 June 2018); 175 (MD 19 November 2015)
- Current ranking: 208 (MS), 594 (MD) (20 August 2019)
- BWF profile
Medal record
Men's badminton
Representing England
European Mixed Team Championships
Bronze medal – third place	2017 Lubin	Mixed team
European Men's Team Championships
Silver medal – second place	2018 Kazan	Men's team
Silver medal – second place	2014 Basel	Men's team
Bronze medal – third place	2016 Kazan	Men's team

Sam Parsons (born 23 August 1995) is a badminton player from England. Parsons started playing badminton at age five. In 2014, he was the finalist in the English National Badminton Championships in the men's singles event and in 2015 the winner of this event.

== Achievements ==
=== BWF International Challenge/Series (5 titles, 1 runner-up) ===
Men's singles
Year	Tournament	Opponent	Score	Result
2019	Carebaco International	(United States) Timothy Lam	21–13, 21–11	(gold) Winner
2018	Iceland International	(India) Bodhit Joshi	21–14, 21–17	(gold) Winner
2017	Egypt International	(Russia) Anatoliy Yartsev	21–23, 21–7, 21–14	(gold) Winner
2016	Swiss International	(Ukraine) Artem Pochtarev	21–8, 21–17	(gold) Winner
2015	Hatzor International	(Czech Republic) Lukas Zevl	20–22, 21–8, 21–8	(gold) Winner

Men's doubles

Year	Tournament	Opponent	Partner	Score	Result
2013	Cyprus International	(Wales) Joe Morgan (Wales) Nic Strange	(England) Rhys Walker	22–24, 21–19, 14–21	(silver) Runner-up

BWF International Challenge tournament
BWF International Series tournament
BWF Future Series tournament
