= Lithuanian International =

Badminton championships

The Lithuanian International is an international badminton tournament held in Lithuania. This tournament has been a Future Series. The 2011 tournament was called Lithuanian Open, and classified as International Series level. It is organised by Lithuanian Badminton Federation.

== Previous winners ==
Year	Men's singles	Women's singles	Men's doubles	Women's doubles	Mixed doubles	Ref
1992	(Lithuania) Ovidijus Zukauskas	(Lithuania) Rasa Mikšytė	No competition			
1993– 1998	No competition					
1999	(Poland) Jacek Niedźwiedzki	(Poland) Katarzyna Krasowska	(Lithuania) Aivaras Kvedarauskas (Lithuania) Donatas Vievesis	(Poland) Katarzyna Krasowska (Poland) Joanna Szleszyńska	(Lithuania) Aivaras Kvedarauskas (Lithuania) Jūratė Prevelienė	
2000	(Lithuania) Aivaras Kvedarauskas	(Lithuania) Neringa Karosaitė	(Lithuania) Donatas Narvilas (Lithuania) Donatas Vievesis	(Latvia) Margarita Mikelsone (Latvia) Kristīne Šefere	(Lithuania) Aivaras Kvedarauskas (Lithuania) Jūratė Prevelienė	
2001	(Finland) Johan Uddfolk	(Ukraine) Natalia Golovkina	(Lithuania) Donatas Narvilas (Finland) Johan Uddfolk	(Lithuania) Neringa Karosaitė (Lithuania) Erika Milikauskaitė	(Ukraine) Dmitry Miznikov (Ukraine) Natalia Golovkina	
2002	(Finland) Johan Uddfolk	(Estonia) Kai-Riin Saluste	(Lithuania) Aivaras Kvedarauskas (Lithuania) Dainius Mikalauskas	(Lithuania) Kristina Dovidaitytė (Lithuania) Ugnė Urbonaitė	(Lithuania) Aivaras Kvedarauskas (Lithuania) Jūratė Prevelienė	
2003	No competition					
2004	(Poland) Rafał Hawel	(Estonia) Kati Tolmoff	(Republic of Ireland) Bruce Topping (Republic of Ireland) Mark Topping	(Lithuania) Kristina Dovidaitytė (Estonia) Kati Tolmoff	(Czech Republic) Petr Koukal (Czech Republic) Martina Benešová	
2005	(Poland) Rafał Hawel	(Poland) Kamila Augustyn	(Poland) Łukasz Moreń (Poland) Wojciech Szkudlarczyk	(Lithuania) Kristina Dovidaitytė (Lithuania) Akvilė Stapušaitytė	(France) Baptiste Carême (France) Emilie Despierre	
2006	(Lithuania) Kęstutis Navickas	(Slovenia) Maja Tvrdy	(Poland) Adam Cwalina (Poland) Wojciech Szkudlarczyk	(Russia) Anastasia Prokopenko (Russia) Elena Chernyavskaya	(Poland) Adam Cwalina (Poland) Małgorzata Kurdelska	
2007– 2010	No competition					
2011	(Lithuania) Kęstutis Navickas	(Republic of Ireland) Chloe Magee	(Poland) Łukasz Moreń (Poland) Wojciech Szkudlarczyk	(Ukraine) Anna Kobceva (Ukraine) Elena Prus	(Republic of Ireland) Sam Magee (Republic of Ireland) Chloe Magee	
2012	No competition					
2013	(Poland) Adrian Dziółko	(Lithuania) Akvilė Stapušaitytė	(Russia) Andrej Ashmarin (Russia) Anatoliy Yartsev	(Russia) Irina Khlebko (Russia) Ksenia Polikarpova	(Russia) Andrej Ashmarin (Russia) Ekaterina Bolotova	
2014	(Finland) Kasper Lehikoinen	(Poland) Anna Narel	(Russia) Denis Grachev (Russia) Artem Karpov	(Russia) Anastasia Dobrinina (Russia) Viktoriia Vorobeva	(Poland) Pawel Pietryja (Poland) Aneta Wojtkowska	
2015	(Czech Republic) Adam Mendrek	(Germany) Yvonne Li	(Poland) Milosz Bochat (Poland) Pawel Pietryja	(France) Marie Batomene (France) Teshana Vignes Waran	(Denmark) Soeren Toft Hansen (France) Teshana Vignes Waran	
2016	(Finland) Kasper Lehikoinen	(Russia) Elena Komendrovskaja	(Poland) Lukasz Moren (Poland) Wojciech Szkudlarczyk	(Russia) Ekaterina Bolotova (Russia) Anastasiia Semenova	(Russia) Denis Grachev (Russia) Ekaterina Bolotova	
2017	(Germany) Kai Schäfer	(Denmark) Anne Hald	(Belgium) Elias Bracke (France) Léo Rossi	(Estonia) Kristin Kuuba (Estonia) Helina Rüütel	(Republic of Ireland) Ciaran Chambers (Republic of Ireland) Sinead Chambers	
2018	(Sweden) Felix Burestedt	(Estonia) Kristin Kuuba	(Czech Republic) Jaromír Janáček (Czech Republic) Tomáš Švejda	(Estonia) Kristin Kuuba (Estonia) Helina Rüütel	(England) Callum Hemming (England) Fee Teng Liew	
2019	(Russia) Georgii Karpov	(France) Léonice Huet	(Poland) Robert Cybulski (Poland) Paweł Pietryja	(Netherlands) Debora Jille (Netherlands) Alyssa Tirtosentono	(Netherlands) Ties van der Lecq (Netherlands) Debora Jille	
2020	Cancelled (Note: This tournament, originally to be played from 4 to 7 June, was later cancelled due to the COVID-19 pandemic in Lithuania.)					
2021	(France) Alex Lanier	(India) Malvika Bansod	(Denmark) Emil Lauritzen (Denmark) Mads Vestergaard	(France) Téa Margueritte (France) Anna Tatranova	(Denmark) Mads Vestergaard (Denmark) Clara Løber	
2022	(Indonesia) Syabda Perkasa Belawa	(Indonesia) Aisyah Sativa Fatetani	(Indonesia) Rayhan Fadillah (Indonesia) Rahmat Hidayat	(Indonesia) Nethania Irawan (Indonesia) Febi Setianingrum	(Indonesia) Amri Syahnawi (Indonesia) Winny Oktavina Kandow	
2023	(Germany) Matthias Kicklitz	(Indonesia) Deswanti Hujansih Nurtertiati	(Indonesia) Putra Erwiansyah (Indonesia) Patra Harapan Rindorindo	(Estonia) Kati-Kreet Marran (Estonia) Helina Rüütel	(Indonesia) Marwan Faza (Indonesia) Jessica Maya Rismawardani	
2024	(Denmark) William Bøgebjerg	(Malaysia) Siti Nurshuhaini	(France) Nicolas Hoareau (France) Aymeric Tores	(France) Marie Cesari (France) Lilou Schaffner	(Indonesia) Alden Mainaky (Indonesia) Fitriani	
2025	(Italy) Christopher Vittoriani	(France) Lole Courtois	(Switzerland) Yann Orteu (Switzerland) Minh Quang Pham	(Ukraine) Maria Koriagina (Ukraine) Yaroslava Vantsarovska	(Sweden) Max Svensson (Sweden) Sofia Strömvall	
2026	(South Korea) Choi Pyeong-gang	(France) Léonice Huet	(Finland) Ananda Galvani Daniswara (Indonesia) Alan Muhammad Afwanil Hakim	(Ukraine) Maria Koriagina (Ukraine) Yaroslava Vantsarovska	(Austria) Ilija Nicolussi (Austria) Lena Rumpold	

== Performances by nation ==
As of the 2026 edition

Pos	Nation	MS	WS	MD	WD	XD	Total
1	Lithuania*	4	3	3.5	3.5	3	17
2	Poland	4	3	6	1	2	16
3	France	1	3	1.5	3	1.5	10
3	Russia	1	1	2	4	2	10
5	Indonesia	1	2	2.5	1	3	9.5
6	Estonia		3		3.5		6.5
7	Finland	4		1			5
7	Ukraine		1		3	1	5
9	Denmark	1	1	1		1.5	4.5
10	Ireland		1	1		2	4
11	Czech Republic	1		1		1	3
11	Germany	2	1				3
13	Netherlands				1	1	2
13	Sweden	1				1	2
15	Austria					1	1
15	England					1	1
15	India		1				1
15	Italy	1					1
15	Latvia				1		1
15	Malaysia		1				1
15	Slovenia		1				1
15	South Korea	1					1
15	Switzerland			1			1
24	Belgium			0.5			0.5
Total		22	22	21	21	21	107

* Host nation
