= Swiss International (badminton) =

The Swiss International is an open international badminton tournament in Switzerland, established since 2011. This tournament was held for the first time from 20 to 23 October 2011 in Bern, then in 2012-2016 held in Yverdon-les-Bains.

== Previous winners ==
Year	Men's singles	Women's singles	Men's doubles	Women's doubles	Mixed doubles
2011	(Indonesia) Andre Kurniawan Tedjono	(India) P. V. Sindhu	(Poland) Łukasz Moreń (Poland) Wojciech Szkudlarczyk	(India) Pradnya Gadre (India) Prajakta Sawant	(Russia) Vitalij Durkin (Russia) Nina Vislova
2012	(Germany) Dieter Domke	(Scotland) Kirsty Gilmour	(Poland) Adam Cwalina (Poland) Przemysław Wacha	(England) Heather Olver (England) Kate Robertshaw	(Germany) Peter Käsbauer (Germany) Isabel Herttrich
2013	(France) Brice Leverdez	(United States) Beiwen Zhang	(Germany) Daniel Benz (Malaysia) Chan Kwong Beng	(Russia) Anastasia Chervyakova (Russia) Nina Vislova	(Russia) Vitalij Durkin (Russia) Nina Vislova
2014	(Indonesia) Jonatan Christie	(Indonesia) Hana Ramadhini	(Philippines) Peter Gabriel Magnaye (Philippines) Paul Jefferson Vivas	(Bulgaria) Gabriela Stoeva (Bulgaria) Stefani Stoeva	(France) Ronan Labar (France) Émilie Lefel
2015	(Malaysia) Iskandar Zulkarnain Zainuddin	(Thailand) Nitchaon Jindapol	(Malaysia) Koo Kien Keat (Malaysia) Tan Boon Heong	(Netherlands) Samantha Barning (Netherlands) Iris Tabeling	(Scotland) Robert Blair (Indonesia) Pia Zebadiah Bernadet
2016	(England) Sam Parsons	(Switzerland) Sabrina Jaquet	(Malaysia) Goh Sze Fei (Malaysia) Nur Izzuddin	(Netherlands) Cheryl Seinen (Netherlands) Iris Tabeling	(Switzerland) Oliver Schaller (Switzerland) Céline Burkart
