= Jaromír Janáček =

Czech badminton player (born 1995)

Personal information
- Born: 18 March 1995 (age 31) Český Krumlov, Czech Republic
- Height: 1.955 m (6 ft 5 in)
- Weight: 88 kg (194 lb)

Sport
- Country: Czech Republic
- Sport: Badminton
- Handedness: Right
- Coached by: Radek Votava; Pavel Florián

Men's singles & doubles
- Highest ranking: 224 (MS 29 March 2018); 75 (MD 26 November 2019); 77 (XD 22 September 2016)
- BWF profile

Jaromír Janáček (born 18 March 1995) is a Czech badminton player.

== Career ==
In 2011 and 2012, he won Croatian Junior International tournament in mixed doubles event, and became the boys' singles runner-up in 2012. In 2014, he became the runner-up of Slovak Open tournament in men's doubles event.

== Achievements ==
=== BWF International Challenge/Series (3 titles, 2 runners-up) ===
Men's doubles
| Year | Tournament | Partner | Opponent | Score | Result |
|---|---|---|---|---|---|
| 2014 | Slovak Open | (Czech Republic) Pavel Drančák | (England) Ben Lane (England) Sean Vendy | 10–11, 5–11. 10–11 | (silver) Runner-up |
| 2018 | Lithuanian International | (Czech Republic) Tomáš Švejda | (Russia) Egor Kurdyukov (Russia) Egor Okolov | 18–21, 21–15, 21–15 | (gold) Winner |
| 2018 | Bulgarian International | (Czech Republic) Tomáš Švejda | (Bulgaria) Ivan Rusev (Bulgaria) Alex Vlaar | 21–19, 21–14 | (gold) Winner |
| 2019 | Slovenian International | (Czech Republic) Tomáš Švejda | (Denmark) Kristoffer Knudsen (Denmark) Mouritz Troels Munk | 21–18, 17–21, 21–11 | (gold) Winner |

Mixed doubles
| Year | Tournament | Partner | Opponent | Score | Result |
|---|---|---|---|---|---|
| 2018 | Croatian International | (Czech Republic) Sabina Milová | (Poland) Paweł Pietryja (Poland) Aneta Wojtkowska | 10–21, 10–21 | (silver) Runner-up |

BWF International Challenge tournament
BWF International Series tournament
BWF Future Series tournament
