= Adrian Dziółko =

Polish badminton player (born 1990)

Personal information
- Born: 22 February 1990 (age 36) Kielce, Poland
- Height: 1.89 m (6 ft 2 in)
- Weight: 65 kg (143 lb)

Sport
- Country: Poland
- Sport: Badminton
- Handedness: Right

Men's singles
- Highest ranking: 51 (1 October 2015)
- Current ranking: 189 (11 May 2021)
- BWF profile
Medal record
Men's badminton
Representing Poland
European Men's Team Championships
Silver medal – second place	2010 Warsaw	Men's team

Adrian Dziółko (Polish pronunciation: [ˈadrjan ˈdʑuwkɔ]; born 22 February 1990) is a Polish badminton player. He competed at the 2016 Summer Olympics in Rio de Janeiro, Brazil.

== Achievements ==
=== BWF International Challenge/Series (2 titles, 8 runners-up) ===
Men's singles
Year	Tournament	Opponent	Score	Result
2012	Turkey International	(Ukraine) Dmytro Zavadsky	19–21, 19–21	(silver) Runner-up
2013	Lithuanian International	(Estonia) Raul Must	23–21, 21–13	(gold) Winner
2014	Romanian International	(Malaysia) Misbun Ramdan Misbun	21–15, 18–21, 16–21	(silver) Runner-up
2015	Welsh International	(Russia) Vladimir Malkov	13–21, 17–21	(silver) Runner-up
2015	Lagos International	(India) B. Sai Praneeth	14–21, 11–21	(silver) Runner-up
2016	Brazil International	(Portugal) Pedro Martins	18–21, 20–22	(silver) Runner-up
2018	Slovak Open	(Indonesia) Andre Marteen	12–21, 14–21	(silver) Runner-up
2018	Dutch International	(Malaysia) Cheam June Wei	21–13, 13–21, 10–21	(silver) Runner-up
2018	Hellas Open	(France) Léo Rossi	21–11, 19–21, 21–19	(gold) Winner

Men's doubles
Year	Tournament	Partner	Opponent	Score	Result
2018	Hellas Open	(Poland) Michał Rogalski	(India) Arjun M.R. (India) Ramchandran Shlok	13–21, 11–21	(silver) Runner-up

BWF International Challenge tournament
BWF International Series tournament
BWF Future Series tournament
