= Aneta Wojtkowska =

Polish badminton player (born 1991)

Personal information
- Born: 9 March 1991 (age 35) Głubczyce, Poland
- Height: 1.65 m (5 ft 5 in)
- Weight: 55 kg (121 lb)

Sport
- Country: Poland
- Sport: Badminton
- Handedness: Right
- Coached by: Bożena Haracz-Wojtkowska

Women's & mixed doubles
- Highest ranking: 108 (WD with Magdalena Witek 4 June 2015); 50 (XD with Paweł Pietryja 20 July 2017)
- BWF profile

Aneta Wojtkowska (born 9 March 1991) is a Polish badminton player. She won her first National Championships title in 2013 partnered with her sister Agnieszka Wojtkowska. She competed at the 2015 European Games in Baku, Azerbaijan.

== Achievements ==
=== BWF International Challenge/Series (4 titles, 6 runners-up) ===
Women's doubles
Year	Tournament	Partner	Opponent	Score	Result
2014	Slovak Open	(Poland) Magdalena Witek	(Croatia) Katarina Galenić (Netherlands) Cheryl Seinen	7–11, 9–11, 11–5, 7–11	(silver) Runner-up
2014	Norwegian International	(Poland) Magdalena Witek	(Denmark) Tilde Iversen (Sweden) Emma Wengberg	13–21, 15–21	(silver) Runner-up

Mixed doubles
Year	Tournament	Partner	Opponent	Score	Result
2014	Lithuanian International	(Poland) Paweł Pietryja	(Republic of Ireland) Ciaran Chambers (Republic of Ireland) Sinead Chambers	21–11, 21–13	(gold) Winner
2014	Slovak Open	(Poland) Paweł Pietryja	(Switzerland) Oliver Schaller (Switzerland) Céline Burkart	9–11, 11–5, 11–9, 7–11, 11–8	(gold) Winner
2015	Hellas International	(Poland) Paweł Pietryja	(Russia) Ilya Zhdanov (Russia) Tatjana Bibik	10–21, 26–28	(silver) Runner-up
2016	Iceland International	(Poland) Paweł Pietryja	(Finland) Anton Kaisti (Netherlands) Cheryl Seinen	20–22, 18–21	(silver) Runner-up
2016	Hellas Open	(Poland) Paweł Pietryja	(Finland) Henri Aarnio (Finland) Jenny Nyström	21–17, 21–17	(gold) Winner
2016	Polish International	(Poland) Paweł Pietryja	(Denmark) Mikkel Mikkelsen (Denmark) Mai Surrow	19–21, 12–21	(silver) Runner-up
2016	Hungarian International	(Poland) Paweł Pietryja	(Singapore) Terry Hee (Singapore) Tan Wei Han	6–11, 7–11, 11–13	(silver) Runner-up
2018	Croatian International	(Poland) Paweł Pietryja	(Czech Republic) Jaromír Janáček (Czech Republic) Sabina Milová	21–10, 21–10	(gold) Winner

BWF International Challenge tournament
BWF International Series tournament
BWF Future Series tournament
