= Fontaine Chapman =

English badminton player (born 1990)

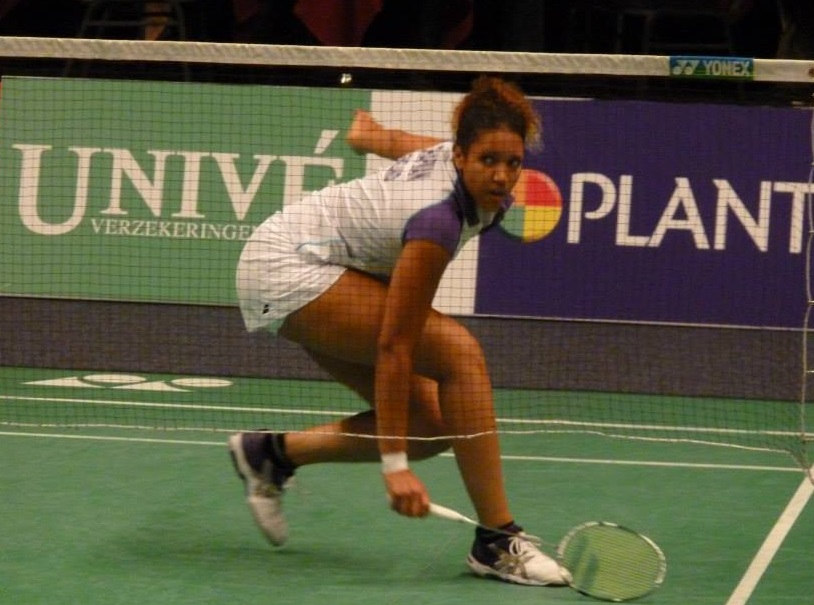

Personal information
- Born: Fontaine Mica Chapman; 2 January 1990 (age 36) Coventry, England
- Height: 5 ft 9 in (175 cm)

Sport
- Country: England
- Sport: Badminton
- Handedness: Right
- Coached by: Stuart Wardell

Women's singles
- Highest ranking: 52 (17 September 2015)
- BWF profile
Medal record
Women's badminton
Representing England
European Mixed Team Championships
Silver medal – second place	2015 Leuven	Mixed team
Bronze medal – third place	2017 Lubin	Mixed team

Fontaine Mica Chapman (born 2 January 1990) is an English badminton player. She started playing badminton at age 6, and joined the England national junior badminton team in 2003.

== Early life, training and domestic results ==
Her grandad used to coach her every day after school when she was a junior from age 9 and also helped her with summer training. She first represented England at the age of 12 years old at the under 13 Aros Junior Cup in Viby J, Denmark. She was runner-up in the women's singles event of the English National Badminton Championships in 2013, reached the semi-finals in 2014 and again a losing finalist in 2015. In the 2016 edition she captured the English National women's singles title. She played for the Birmingham Lions in the National Badminton League. She won a silver medal with the English National squad at the 2015 European Mixed Team Badminton Championships in Leuven, Belgium.

== Achievements ==
=== BWF International Challenge/Series ===
Women's singles
Year	Tournament	Opponent	Score	Result
2013	Auckland International	(England) Tracey Hallam	15-21, 16-21	(silver) Runner-up
2014	Hungarian International	(Denmark) Sandra-Maria Jensen	11-2, 11-10, 11-9	(gold) Winner
2015	Hellas International	(Bulgaria) Linda Zetchiri	21–9, 14–6 retired	(gold) Winner

Commonwealth Youth Games tournament
BWF International Series tournament
BWF Future Series tournament
