= Paweł Pietryja =

Polish badminton player (born 1992)

Personal information
- Born: 2 June 1992 (age 34) Pszczyna, Poland
- Height: 1.84 m (6 ft 0 in)
- Weight: 82 kg (181 lb)

Sport
- Country: Poland
- Sport: Badminton
- Handedness: Right
- Coached by: Damian Piawecki

Men's & mixed doubles
- Highest ranking: 77 (MD 22 September 2016); 50 (XD 20 July 2017)
- BWF profile

Paweł Pietryja (born 2 June 1992) is a Polish badminton player who affiliate with UKS Plesbad Pszczyna. He competed at the 2015 European Games in Baku, Azerbaijan. In 2016, he won two titles at the Hellas Open in the men's doubles event partnered with Miłosz Bochat and in the mixed doubles event with Aneta Wojtkowska.

== Achievements ==
=== BWF International Challenge/Series (8 titles, 10 runners-up) ===
Men's doubles
Year	Tournament	Partner	Opponent	Score	Result
2015	Romanian International	(Poland) Miłosz Bochat	(Croatia) Zvonimir Đurkinjak (Croatia) Zvonimir Hölbling	9–11, 8–11, 7–11	(silver) Runner-up
2015	Hellas International	(Poland) Miłosz Bochat	(Russia) Vladimir Rusin (Russia) Ilya Zhdanov	13–21, 24–22, 21–13	(gold) Winner
2015	Lithuanian International	(Poland) Miłosz Bochat	(Lithuania) Povilas Bartušis (Lithuania) Alan Plavin	21–17, 21–13	(gold) Winner
2015	Polish International	(Poland) Wojciech Szkudlarczyk	(Denmark) Kasper Antonsen (Denmark) Niclas Nøhr	21–17, 8–21, 12–21	(silver) Runner-up
2016	Hellas Open	(Poland) Miłosz Bochat	(Sweden) Filip Michael Duwall Myhren (Denmark) Steve Olesen	14–21, 21–18, 21–16	(gold) Winner
2019	Slovenian International	(Poland) Adam Cwalina	(Japan) Shohei Hoshino (Japan) Yujiro Nishikawa	9–21, 11–21	(silver) Runner-up
2019	Lithuanian International	(Poland) Robert Cybulski	(Denmark) Emil Lauritzen (Denmark) Mads Muurholm	15–21, 21–19, 21–19	(gold) Winner
2019	Egypt International	(Poland) Jan Rudziński	(Algeria) Koceila Mammeri (Algeria) Youcef Sabri Medel	19–21, 22–24	(silver) Runner-up
2019	Algeria International	(Poland) Jan Rudziński	(Algeria) Koceila Mammeri (Algeria) Youcef Sabri Medel	16–21, 16–21	(silver) Runner-up

Mixed doubles
Year	Tournament	Partner	Opponent	Score	Result
2014	Lithuanian International	(Poland) Aneta Wojtkowska	(Republic of Ireland) Ciaran Chambers (Republic of Ireland) Sinead Chambers	21–11, 21–13	(gold) Winner
2014	Slovak Open	(Poland) Aneta Wojtkowska	(Switzerland) Oliver Schaller (Switzerland) Céline Burkart	9–11, 11–5, 11–9, 7–11, 11–8	(gold) Winner
2015	Hellas International	(Poland) Aneta Wojtkowska	(Russia) Ilya Zhdanov (Russia) Tatjana Bibik	10–21, 26–28	(silver) Runner-up
2016	Iceland International	(Poland) Aneta Wojtkowska	(Finland) Anton Kaisti (Netherlands) Cheryl Seinen	20–22, 18–21	(silver) Runner-up
2016	Hellas Open	(Poland) Aneta Wojtkowska	(Finland) Henri Aarnio (Finland) Jenny Nyström	21–17, 21–17	(gold) Winner
2016	Polish International	(Poland) Aneta Wojtkowska	(Denmark) Mikkel Mikkelsen (Denmark) Mai Surrow	19–21, 12–21	(silver) Runner-up
2016	Hungarian International	(Poland) Aneta Wojtkowska	(Singapore) Terry Hee (Singapore) Tan Wei Han	6–11, 7–11, 11–13	(silver) Runner-up
2018	Croatian International	(Poland) Aneta Wojtkowska	(Czech Republic) Jaromír Janáček (Czech Republic) Sabina Milová	21–10, 21–10	(gold) Winner
2018	Hellas Open	(Poland) Agnieszka Wojtkowska	(India) Arjun M.R. (India) K. Maneesha	15–21, 14–21	(silver) Runner-up

BWF International Challenge tournament
BWF International Series tournament
BWF Future Series tournament
