= Miłosz Bochat =

Polish badminton player (born 1995)

Personal information
- Born: 19 December 1995 (age 30) Bydgoszcz, Poland
- Height: 1.85 m (6 ft 1 in)
- Weight: 83 kg (183 lb)

Sport
- Country: Poland
- Sport: Badminton
- Handedness: Right
- Coached by: Maciej Dąbkowski

Men's singles & doubles
- Highest ranking: 769 (MS 24 October 2013); 46 (MD 22 February 2018); 147 (XD 26 April 2018)
- BWF profile

Miłosz Bochat (Polish pronunciation: [ˈmiwɔʐ ˈbɔxat]; (Note: In isolation, Miłosz is pronounced [ˈmiwɔʂ].) born 19 December 1995) is a Polish badminton player. He started his career in MLKS Solec Kujawski club and entered the national team in 2010. In 2018, he joined ABRM Warszawa club. Bochat competed at the 2015 and 2019 European Games.

== Achievements ==
=== BWF International Challenge/Series (5 titles, 8 runners-up) ===
Men's doubles
Year	Tournament	Partner	Opponent	Score	Result
2014	Norwegian International	(Poland) Maciej Dąbrowski	(Finland) Anton Kaisti (Netherlands) Koen Ridder	13–21, 14–21	(silver) Runner-up
2015	Romanian International	(Poland) Paweł Pietryja	(Croatia) Zvonimir Đurkinjak (Croatia) Zvonimir Hölbling	9–11, 8–11, 7–11	(silver) Runner-up
2015	Hellas International	(Poland) Paweł Pietryja	(Russia) Vladimir Rusin (Russia) Ilya Zhdanov	13–21, 24–22, 21–13	(gold) Winner
2015	Lithuanian International	(Poland) Paweł Pietryja	(Lithuania) Povilas Bartušis (Lithuania) Alan Plavin	21–17, 21–13	(gold) Winner
2016	Hellas Open	(Poland) Paweł Pietryja	(Sweden) Filip Michael Duwall Myhren (Denmark) Steve Olesen	14–21, 21–18, 21–16	(gold) Winner
2017	Czech Open	(Poland) Adam Cwalina	(England) Ben Lane (England) Sean Vendy	21–18, 23–21	(gold) Winner
2017	Italian International	(Poland) Adam Cwalina	(Netherlands) Jelle Maas (Netherlands) Robin Tabeling	21–23, 18–21	(silver) Runner-up
2018	Polish International	(Poland) Adam Cwalina	(Chinese Taipei) Lin Shang-kai (Chinese Taipei) Tseng Min-hao	13–21, 16–21	(silver) Runner-up
2018	Czech Open	(Poland) Adam Cwalina	(France) Thom Gicquel (France) Ronan Labar	18–21, 21–17, 15–21	(silver) Runner-up
2018	Hungarian International	(Poland) Adam Cwalina	(Denmark) David Daugaard (Denmark) Frederik Søgaard	21–15, 12–21, 12–21	(silver) Runner-up
2019	Hellas International	(Poland) Paweł Śmiłowski	(England) Zach Russ (England) Steven Stallwood	21–19, 18–21, 21–11	(gold) Winner
2023	Polish International	(Poland) Paweł Śmiłowski	(England) Callum Hemming (England) Ethan van Leeuwen	16–21, 12–21	(silver) Runner-up

Mixed doubles
Year	Tournament	Partner	Opponent	Score	Result
2019	Hellas International	(Poland) Magdalena Świerczyńska	(Bulgaria) Alex Vlaar (Bulgaria) Mariya Mitsova	21–10, 21–23, 17–21	(silver) Runner-up

BWF International Challenge tournament
BWF International Series tournament
BWF Future Series tournament
