= Linda Zetchiri =

Bulgarian badminton player (born 1987)

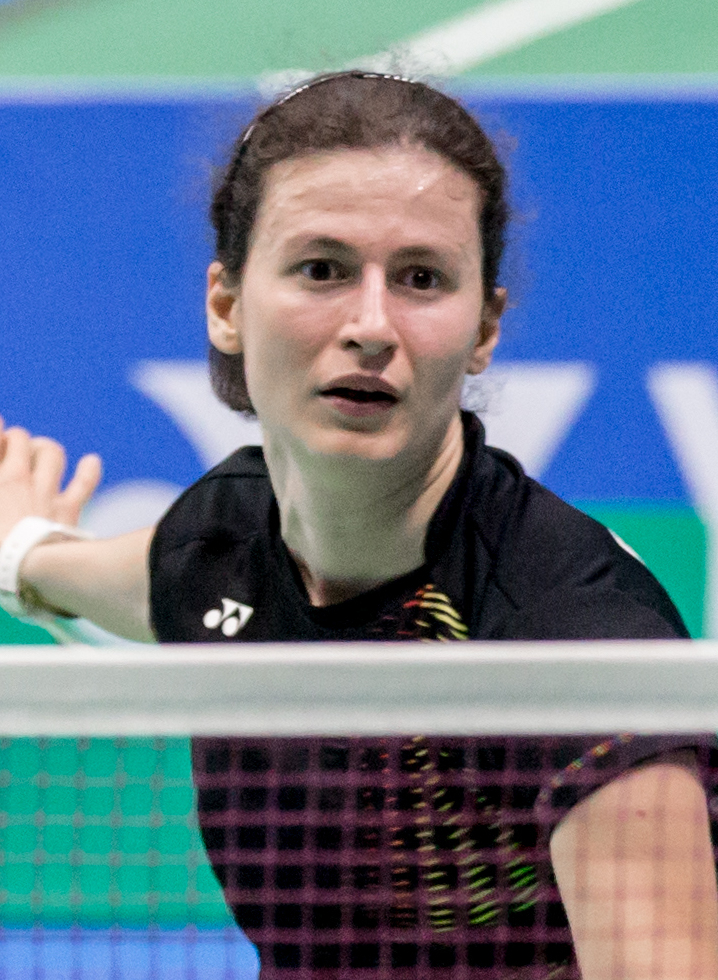
- Zetchiri at the 2018 European Women's Team Championships

Personal information
- Born: 27 July 1987 (age 39) Sofia, Bulgaria
- Height: 1.67 m (5 ft 6 in)
- Weight: 57 kg (126 lb)

Sport
- Country: Bulgaria
- Sport: Badminton

Women's singles
- Highest ranking: 21 (27 April 2017)
- BWF profile
Medal record
Women's badminton
Representing Bulgaria
European Championships
Bronze medal – third place	2012 Karlskrona	Women's singles
European Women's Team Championships
Silver medal – second place	2016 Kazan	Women's team
Bronze medal – third place	2014 Basel	Women's team
European Junior Championships
Bronze medal – third place	2005 Den Bosch	Girls' singles

Linda Zetchiri (Bulgarian: Линда Зечири; Albanian: Linda Zeqiri; born 27 July 1987) is a Bulgarian badminton player. She competed in the women's singles at the 2016 and 2020 Summer Olympics.

== Career ==
Zetchiri is one of the leading Bulgarian players in the sport. She was the bronze medallists at the 2005 European Junior and 2012 European Championships. She competed at the 2015 Baku and 2019 Minsk European Games.

== Personal life ==
Zetchiri was born in Sofia (Bulgaria) and is of mixed ancestry, having Kosovo Albanian (through her grandfather) and Italian roots (on her grandmother's side). Her mother is Bulgarian. Her sister, Dzhema, serves as her sports manager.

== Achievements ==
=== European Championships ===
Women's singles
Year	Venue	Opponent	Score	Result
2012	Telenor Arena; Karlskrona, Sweden	(Denmark) Tine Baun	13–21, 14–21	Bronze

=== European Junior Championships ===
Girls' singles
Year	Venue	Opponent	Score	Result
2005	De Maaspoort; Den Bosch, Netherlands	(Switzerland) Jeanine Cicognini	5–11, 5–11	Bronze

=== BWF Grand Prix (2 runners-up) ===
The BWF Grand Prix had two levels, the Grand Prix and Grand Prix Gold. It was a series of badminton tournaments sanctioned by the Badminton World Federation (BWF) and played between 2007 and 2017.

Women's singles
Year	Tournament	Opponent	Score	Result
2008	Dutch Open	(Netherlands) Yao Jie	14–21, 13–21	(silver) Runner-up
2013	Bitburger Open	(Thailand) Nitchaon Jindapol	13–21, 13–21	(silver) Runner-up

BWF Grand Prix Gold tournament
BWF Grand Prix tournament

=== BWF International Challenge/Series (9 titles, 13 runners-up) ===
Women's singles
Year	Tournament	Opponent	Score	Result
2008	Slovenian International	(Belgium) Lianne Tan	21–15, 21–15	(gold) Winner
2009	Banuinvest International	(Bulgaria) Petya Nedelcheva	9–21, 17–21	(silver) Runner-up
2009	Bulgarian International	(Bulgaria) Petya Nedelcheva	14–21, 8–19 retired	(silver) Runner-up
2010	Turkey International	(Netherlands) Judith Meulendijks	21–19, 18–21, 15–21	(silver) Runner-up
2011	Bulgarian International	(Turkey) Neslihan Yiğit	21–18, 21–14	(gold) Winner
2011	Norwegian International	(Republic of Ireland) Chloe Magee	21–19, 21–14	(gold) Winner
2012	Portugal International	(Spain) Beatriz Corrales	15–21, 15–21	(silver) Runner-up
2012	Norwegian International	(France) Sashina Vignes Waran	21–18, 11–21, 17–21	(silver) Runner-up
2013	Cyprus International	(Wales) Carissa Turner	21–15, 21–19	(gold) Winner
2013	Hellas International	(Switzerland) Nicole Schaller	21–14, 21–19	(gold) Winner
2013	Bulgaria Eurasia Open	(Bulgaria) Stefani Stoeva	16–21, 18–21	(silver) Runner-up
2014	Hellas International	(Republic of Ireland) Chloe Magee	21–13, 21–13	(gold) Winner
2014	Kharkiv International	(Turkey) Özge Bayrak	10–11, 11–5, 3–11, 11–8, 11–5	(gold) Winner
2014	Welsh International	(Spain) Beatriz Corrales	21–10, 13–21, 13–21	(silver) Runner-up
2015	Iran Fajr International	(Turkey) Neslihan Yiğit	21–19, 21–14	(gold) Winner
2015	Austrian International	(Hong Kong) Cheung Ngan Yi	16–21, 8–21	(silver) Runner-up
2015	Hellas International	(England) Fontaine Chapman	9–21, 6–14 retired	(silver) Runner-up
2015	Czech Open	(Scotland) Kirsty Gilmour	16–21, 14–21	(silver) Runner-up
2019	Brazil International	(Belgium) Lianne Tan	21–17, 12–21, 4–13 retired	(silver) Runner-up
2020	Iran Fajr International	(United States) Crystal Pan	18–21, 14–21	(silver) Runner-up
2020	Jamaica International	(Japan) Momoka Kimura	12–21, 12–21	(silver) Runner-up
2020	Bulgarian International	(Serbia) Marija Sudimac	21–7, 21–10	(gold) Winner

BWF International Challenge tournament
BWF International Series tournament

== See also ==
- Bulgarian National Badminton Championships
