= Oliver Schaller =

Swiss badminton player (born 1994)

Personal information
- Born: 15 August 1994 (age 32) Bösingen, Switzerland
- Height: 1.80 m (5 ft 11 in)
- Weight: 78 kg (172 lb)

Sport
- Country: Switzerland
- Sport: Badminton
- Handedness: Right

Men's & mixed doubles
- Highest ranking: 116 (MD 29 September 2016); 55 (XD 19 October 2017)
- BWF profile

Oliver Schaller (born 15 August 1994) is a Swiss badminton player. He competed at the 2015 and 2019 European Games. Schaller won his first international title at the 2016 Swiss International in the mixed doubles event partnered with Céline Burkart.

== Achievements ==
=== BWF International Challenge/Series (2 titles, 2 runners-up) ===
Men's doubles
Year	Tournament	Partner	Opponent	Score	Result
2013	Slovak Open	(Malaysia) Tan Bin Shen	(Russia) Nikita Khakimov (Russia) Vasily Kuznetsov	9–21, 22–20, 18–21	(silver) Runner-up

Mixed doubles
Year	Tournament	Partner	Opponent	Score	Result
2014	Slovak Open	(Switzerland) Céline Burkart	(Poland) Paweł Pietryja (Poland) Aneta Wojtkowska	11–9, 5–11, 9–11, 11–7, 8–11	(silver) Runner-up
2016	Swiss International	(Switzerland) Céline Burkart	(France) Thom Gicquel (France) Delphine Delrue	21–17, 10–21, 21–19	(gold) Winner
2018	Egypt International	(Switzerland) Céline Burkart	(Jordan) Bahaedeen Ahmad Alshannik (Jordan) Domou Amro	21–4, 21–10	(gold) Winner

BWF International Challenge tournament
BWF International Series tournament
BWF Future Series tournament
