= Céline Burkart =

Swiss badminton player (born 1995)

Personal information
- Born: 25 April 1995 (age 31) Abtwil, Switzerland
- Height: 1.65 m (5 ft 5 in)
- Weight: 55 kg (121 lb)

Sport
- Country: Switzerland
- Sport: Badminton
- Handedness: Right
- Coached by: John Dinesen; Judith Meulendijks

Women's & mixed doubles
- Highest ranking: 61 (WD 20 October 2016); 55 (XD 19 October 2017)
- BWF profile

Céline Burkart (born 25 April 1995) is a Swiss badminton player. She competed at the 2015 and 2019 European Games. Burkart was a runner-up at the 2014 Slovak Open in the mixed doubles event partnered with Oliver Schaller, and later won the Swiss International tournament after beat the French pair. They were taken to three games, a match that saw them drop their first set of the tournament. They were steadied to take the match and the title 21–19 in the deciding set.

== Achievements ==
=== BWF International Challenge/Series (2 titles, 1 runner-up) ===
Mixed doubles
Year	Tournament	Partner	Opponent	Score	Result
2014	Slovak Open	(Switzerland) Oliver Schaller	(Poland) Paweł Pietryja (Poland) Aneta Wojtkowska	11–9, 5–11, 9–11, 11–7, 8–11	(silver) Runner-up
2016	Swiss International	(Switzerland) Oliver Schaller	(France) Thom Gicquel (France) Delphine Delrue	21–17, 10–21, 21–19	(gold) Winner
2018	Egypt International	(Switzerland) Oliver Schaller	(Jordan) Bahaedeen Ahmad Alshannik (Jordan) Domou Amro	21–4, 21–10	(gold) Winner

BWF International Challenge tournament
BWF International Series tournament
BWF Future Series tournament
