= 2015 German Open Grand Prix Gold =

Tournament details
- Dates: February 24, 2015 - March 1, 2015
- Level: Grand Prix Gold
- Total prize money: US$120,000
- Venue: RWE-Sporthalle
- Location: Mulheim an der Ruhr, Germany

Champions
- Men's singles: (Denmark) Jan Ø. Jørgensen
- Women's singles: (South Korea) Sung Ji-hyun
- Men's doubles: (Denmark) Mads Conrad-Petersen (Denmark) Mads Pieler Kolding
- Women's doubles: (Denmark) Christinna Pedersen (Denmark) Kamilla Rytter Juhl
- Mixed doubles: (Denmark) Mads Pieler Kolding (Denmark) Kamilla Rytter Juhl

The 2015 German Open Grand Prix Gold was the Third grand prix gold and grand prix tournament of the 2015 BWF Grand Prix and Grand Prix Gold. The tournament was held in RWE-Sporthalle, Mulheim an der Ruhr, Germany from February 24 until March 1, 2015, and had a total purse of $120,000.

== Men's singles ==
=== Seeds ===
1. (Denmark) Jan Ø. Jørgensen (champion)
2. (South Korea) Son Wan-ho (semi-final)
3. (Chinese Taipei) Chou Tien-chen (third round)
4. (Denmark) Hans-Kristian Vittinghus (quarter-final)
5. (Indonesia) Tommy Sugiarto (withdrew)
6. (Japan) Kento Momota (withdrew)
7. (Germany) Marc Zwiebler (withdrew)
8. (Japan) Sho Sasaki (quarter-final)
9. (Thailand) Tanongsak Saensomboonsuk (first round)
10. (South Korea) Lee Dong-keun (third round)
11. (England) Rajiv Ouseph (withdrew)
12. (Hong Kong) Wei Nan (first round)
13. (Chinese Taipei) Hsu Jen-hao (first round)
14. (Japan) Takuma Ueda (second round)
15. (France) Brice Leverdez (first round)
16. (Hong Kong) Wong Wing Ki (semi-final)

=== Finals ===
Quarterfinals
1 | (Denmark) Jan Ø. Jørgensen | 21 | 21
8 | (Japan) Sho Sasaki | 16 | 13
(Japan) Kazumasa Sakai | 20 | 22
16 | (Hong Kong) Wong Wing Ki | 22 | 24
(Indonesia) Dionysius Hayom Rumbaka | 22 | 21
4 | (Denmark) Hans-Kristian Vittinghus | 20 | 15
(Indonesia) Andre Kurniawan Tedjono | 9 | 19
2 | (South Korea) Son Wan-ho | 21 | 21

Semifinals
1 | (Denmark) Jan Ø. Jørgensen | 21 | 21
16 | (Hong Kong) Wong Wing Ki | 18 | 13
(Indonesia) Dionysius Hayom Rumbaka | 21 | 21
2 | (South Korea) Son Wan-ho | 17 | 15

Final
1 | (Denmark) Jan Ø. Jørgensen | 21 | 21
(Indonesia) Dionysius Hayom Rumbaka | 12 | 13

=== Top half ===
==== Section 1 ====
First round
1 | (Denmark) J Ø Jørgensen | 21 | 21
(Sri Lanka) D Karunaratne | 11 | 12
(Chinese Taipei) Wang T-w
(Belgium) Y Tan | wo
10 | (South Korea) Lee D-k | 21 | 21
(Slovenia) I Utrosa | 14 | 10
Q3 | (Malaysia) I Zainuddin | 18 | 21 | 23
Q1 | (Indonesia) W Prasetyo | 21 | 19 | 21

Second round
1 | (Denmark) J Ø Jørgensen | 21 | 21
(Chinese Taipei) Wang T-w | 19 | 19
10 | (South Korea) Lee D-k | 24 | 21
Q3 | (Malaysia) I Zainuddin | 22 | 12

Third round
1 | (Denmark) J Ø Jørgensen | 21 | 21
10 | (South Korea) Lee D-k | 17 | 16

==== Section 2 ====
First round
8 | (Japan) S Sasaki | 21 | 17 | 21
(Republic of Ireland) S Evans | 18 | 21 | 13
(Italy) I Ade Chandra | 21 | 16 | 18
(Estonia) R Must | 17 | 21 | 21
15 | (France) B Leverdez | 16 | 21 | 20
Q2 | (Germany) F Roth | 21 | 12 | 22
(Netherlands) E Pang | 18 | 14
(Singapore) D Wong | 21 | 21

Second round
8 | (Japan) S Sasaki | 21 | 21
(Estonia) R Must | 18 | 18
Q2 | (Germany) F Roth | 21 | 18 | 11
(Singapore) D Wong | 17 | 21 | 21

Third round
8 | (Japan) S Sasaki | 21 | 21
(Singapore) D Wong | 12 | 13

==== Section 3 ====
First round
3 | (Chinese Taipei) Chou T-c | 21 | 21
(Ukraine) D Zavadsky | 16 | 15
(India) A Jayaram | 21 | 21
(Thailand) B Ponsana | 7 | 16
14 | (Japan) T Ueda | 21 | 21
(Poland) M Rogalski | 14 | 13
(Japan) K Sakai | 21 | 21
(United States) B Seguin | 8 | 8

Second round
3 | (Chinese Taipei) Chou T-c | 21 | 21
(India) A Jayaram | 16 | 12
14 | (Japan) T Ueda | 21 | 18 | 19
(Japan) K Sakai | 13 | 21 | 21

Third round
3 | (Chinese Taipei) Chou T-c | 8 | 22 | 16
(Japan) K Sakai | 21 | 20 | 21

==== Section 4 ====
First round
PFQ | (Malaysia) B Wong | 12 | 21 | 6
Q8 | (Indonesia) FA Kholik | 21 | 17 | 21
(Hong Kong) Ng KL | 17 | 21 | 21
(Denmark) F Quach | 21 | 6 | 15
16 | (Hong Kong) Wong WK | 21 | 21
(Indonesia) S Santoso | 17 | 16
PFQ | (Denmark) K Bruun | 13 | 21 | 21
PFQ | (Sri Lanka) N Karunaratne | 21 | 15 | 17

Second round
Q8 | (Indonesia) FA Kholik | 21 | 22
(Hong Kong) Ng KL | 12 | 20
16 | (Hong Kong) Wong WK | 21 | 21
PFQ | (Denmark) K Bruun | 8 | 18

Third round
Q8 | (Indonesia) FA Kholik | 12 | 19
16 | (Hong Kong) Wong WK | 21 | 21

=== Bottom half ===
==== Section 5 ====
First round
(Russia) V Malkov | 21 | 19 | 20
PFQ | (Ukraine) V Atraschenkov | 8 | 21 | 22
(Indonesia) D Rumbaka | 21 | 10 | 21
13 | (Chinese Taipei) Hsu J-h | 10 | 21 | 18
Q4 | (Republic of Ireland) J Magee | 22 | 15 | 16
(France) L Corvée | 20 | 21 | 21
(Lithuania) K Navickas | 21 | 0
PFQ | (Finland) K Lehikoinen | 17 | 0^{r}

Second round
PFQ | (Ukraine) V Atrashchenkov | 10 | 13
(Indonesia) D Rumbaka | 21 | 21
(France) L Corvée | 21 | 21
(Lithuania) K Navickas | 18 | 9

Third round
(Indonesia) D Rumbaka | 21 | 21
(France) L Corvée | 11 | 12

==== Section 6 ====
First round
(Poland) A Dziolko | 17 | 18
(Malaysia) Goh SH | 21 | 21
(Denmark) C Lind Thomsen | 15 | 21 | 21
12 | (Hong Kong) Wei N | 21 | 19 | 18
(Ukraine) A Pochtarov | 13 | 14
(Denmark) R Fladberg | 21 | 21
(Netherlands) N Fransman | 16 | 19
4 | (Denmark) H Vittinghus | 21 | 21

Second round
(Malaysia) Goh SH | 12 | 21 | 21
(Denmark) C Lind Thomsen | 21 | 12 | 17
(Denmark) R Fladberg | 14 | 14
4 | (Denmark) H Vittinghus | 21 | 21

Third round
(Malaysia) Goh SH | 11 | 15
4 | (Denmark) H Vittinghus | 21 | 21

==== Section 7 ====
First round
(France) T Rouxel | 21 | 21
(United States) S Pongnairat | 8 | 18
(Denmark) E Holst | 21 | 21
9 | (Thailand) T Saensomboonsuk | 19 | 11
(Indonesia) A Tedjono | 21 | 21
(Netherlands) E Meijs | 14 | 16
(France) L Claerbout | 21 | 21
PFQ | (Belgium) M Moreels | 12 | 8

Second round
(France) T Rouxel | 21 | 21
(Denmark) E Holst | 16 | 13
(Indonesia) A Tedjono | 21 | 21
(France) L Claerbout | 11 | 11

Third round
(France) T Rouxel | 17 | 18
(Indonesia) A Tedjono | 21 | 21

==== Section 8 ====
First round
Q6 | (France) M Baumann | 17 | 21 | 18
Q7 | (Germany) P Kaemnitz | 21 | 17 | 21
(India) A Bhat | 21 | 13 | 21
PFQ | (Bulgaria) B Kisyov | 6 | 21 | 15
(Finland) E Heino | 21 | 12 | 21
(Czech Republic) M Ludík | 18 | 21 | 19
Q5 | (Indonesia) T Mahbub | 15 | 10
2 | (South Korea) Son W-h | 21 | 21

Second round
Q7 | (Germany) P Kaemnitz | 10 | 22
(India) A Bhat | 21 | 24
(Finland) E Heino | 21 | 10
2 | (South Korea) Son W-h | 23 | 21

Third round
(India) A Bhat | 12 | 13
2 | (South Korea) Son W-h | 21 | 21

== Women's singles ==
=== Seeds ===
1. (South Korea) Sung Ji-hyun (champion)
2. (Spain) Carolina Marín (final)
3. (South Korea) Bae Yeon-ju (quarter-final)
4. (United States) Zhang Beiwen (quarter-final)
5. (Japan) Sayaka Takahashi (semi-final)
6. (Canada) Michelle Li (second round)
7. (Japan) Akane Yamaguchi (first round)
8. (Japan) Minatsu Mitani (quarter-final)

=== Finals ===
Semifinals
1 | (South Korea) Sung Ji-hyun | 21 | 21
(Japan) Nozomi Okuhara | 19 | 13
5 | (Japan) Sayaka Takahashi | 16 | 12
2 | (Spain) Carolina Marín | 21 | 21

Final
1 | (South Korea) Sung Ji-hyun | 21 | 14 | 21
2 | (Spain) Carolina Marín | 15 | 21 | 6

=== Top half ===
==== Section 1 ====
First round
1 | (South Korea) Sung J-h | 21 | 21
(Republic of Ireland) C Magee | 15 | 10
(Chinese Taipei) Pai Y-p | 21 | 17 | 21
(Scotland) K Gilmour | 14 | 21 | 17
7 | (Japan) A Yamaguchi | 21 | 17 | 18
Q3 | (South Korea) Kim H-m | 19 | 21 | 21
(Bulgaria) L Zetchiri | 23 | 19 | 8
Q2 | (Hong Kong) Cheung NY | 21 | 21 | 21

Second round
1 | (South Korea) Sung J-h | 21 | 21
(Chinese Taipei) Pai Y-p | 16 | 14
Q3 | (South Korea) Kim H-m | 21 | 22
Q2 | (Hong Kong) Cheung NY | 14 | 20

Quarterfinals
1 | (South Korea) Sung J-h | 23 | 21
Q3 | (South Korea) Kim H-m | 21 | 15

==== Section 2 ====
First round
4 | (United States) Zhang BW | 21 | 25
(Thailand) P Buranaprasertsuk | 17 | 23
(Spain) B Corrales | 18 | 22 | 16
(Thailand) B Ongbumrungpan | 21 | 20 | 21
6 | (Canada) M Li | 21 | 14 | 21
(France) S Vignes Waran | 12 | 21 | 17
(Japan) N Okuhara | 16 | 21 | 21
(Denmark) L Kjaersfeldt | 21 | 9 | 10

Second round
4 | (United States) Zhang BW | 21 | 21
(Thailand) B Ongbumrungpan | 14 | 18
6 | (Canada) M Li | 15 | 20
(Japan) N Okuhara | 21 | 22

Quarterfinals
4 | (United States) Zhang BW | 21 | 14 | 19
(Japan) N Okuhara | 9 | 21 | 21

=== Bottom half ===
==== Section 3 ====
First round
(Hong Kong) Yip PY | 10 | 3^{r}
(Germany) K Schnaase | 21 | 3
(Indonesia) M Kusumastuti | 15 | 10
5 | (Japan) S Takahashi | 21 | 21
(United States) I Wang | 21 | 13 | 12
(Denmark) A Madsen | 11 | 21 | 21
(Thailand) N Jindapon | 21 | 10 | 19
3 | (South Korea) Bae Y-j | 17 | 21 | 21

Second round
(Germany) K Schnaase | 13 | 5
5 | (Japan) S Takahashi | 21 | 21
(Denmark) A Madsen | 10 | 10
3 | (South Korea) Bae Y-j | 21 | 21

Quarterfinals
5 | (Japan) S Takahashi | 21 | 21
3 | (South Korea) Bae Y-j | 19 | 15

==== Section 4 ====
First round
(Japan) S Sato | 17 | 17
Q1 | (Japan) Y Hashimoto | 21 | 21
Q4 | (Netherlands) S Eijbergen | 10 | 12
8 | (Japan) M Mitani | 21 | 21
(Japan) K Imabeppu | 24 | 22
(Chinese Taipei) Hsu Y-c | 22 | 20
(Bulgaria) P Nedelcheva | 11 | 19
2 | (Spain) C Marín | 21 | 21

Second round
Q1 | (Japan) Y Hashimoto | 23 | 12 | 16
8 | (Japan) M Mitani | 21 | 21 | 21
(Japan) K Imabeppu | 14 | 12
2 | (Spain) C Marín | 21 | 21

Quarterfinals
8 | (Japan) M Mitani | 6 | 19
2 | (Spain) C Marín | 21 | 21

== Men's doubles ==
=== Seeds ===
1. (Chinese Taipei) Lee Sheng-mu / Tsai Chia-hsin (quarter-final)
2. (Japan) Hiroyuki Endo / Kenichi Hayakawa (semi-final)
3. (Japan) Hirokatsu Hashimoto / Noriyasu Hirata (quarter-final)
4. (Denmark) Mads Conrad-Petersen / Mads Pieler Kolding (champion)
5. (South Korea) Kim Ki-jung / Kim Sa-rang (quarter-final)
6. (Russia) Vladimir Ivanov / Ivan Sozonov (final)
7. (Japan) Takeshi Kamura / Keigo Sonoda (second round)
8. (Germany) Michael Fuchs / Johannes Schöttler (withdrew)

=== Finals ===
Semifinals

Final

6
- (Russia) Vladimir Ivanov
- (Russia) Ivan Sozonov
21
19
21

- (Denmark) Kim Astrup Sorensen
7
21
17

6
- (Russia) Vladimir Ivanov
- (Russia) Ivan Sozonov
20
19

4
- (Denmark) Mads Conrad-Petersen
- (Denmark) Mads Pieler Kolding
22
21

4
- (Denmark) Mads Conrad-Petersen
- (Denmark) Mads Pieler Kolding
21
21

2
- (Japan) Hiroyuki Endo
- (Japan) Kenichi Hayakawa
16
14

=== Top half ===
==== Section 1 ====
First round

Second round

Quarterfinals

1
- (Chinese Taipei) Lee S-m
- (Chinese Taipei) Tsai C-h
21
21

- (Netherlands) J Arends
- (Netherlands) J Maas
18
14

1
- (Chinese Taipei) Lee S-m
- (Chinese Taipei) Tsai C-h
21
21

- (Belgium) M Dierickx
- (Belgium) F Golinski
15
13

Q3
- (Indonesia) A Aldiartama
- (Indonesia) F Kurniawan
19
24
19

- (Belgium) M Dierickx
- (Belgium) F Golinski
21
22
21

1
- (Chinese Taipei) Lee S-m
- (Chinese Taipei) Tsai C-h
26
15
18

6
- (Russia) V Ivanov
- (Russia) I Sozonov
24
21
21

6
- (Russia) V Ivanov
- (Russia) I Sozonov
21
21

PFQ
- (Indonesia) F Alfian
- (Indonesia) R Ardianto
13
18

6
- (Russia) V Ivanov
- (Russia) I Sozonov
21
21

- (Indonesia) R Sugiarto
- (Indonesia) A Wirawan
11
14

- (Indonesia) R Sugiarto
- (Indonesia) A Wirawan
23
14
23

- (South Korea) Choi S-k
- (South Korea) Ko S-h
21
21
21

==== Section 2 ====
First round

Second round

Quarterfinals

3
- (Japan) H Hashimoto
- (Japan) N Hirata
21
21

- (France) B Kersaudy
- (France) G Mittelheisser
15
13

3
- (Japan) H Hashimoto
- (Japan) N Hirata
21
21

- (Poland) A Cwalina
- (Poland) P Wacha
19
18

- (Germany) R Beck
- (Germany) A Heinz
17
16

- (Poland) A Cwalina
- (Poland) P Wacha
21
21

3
- (Japan) H Hashimoto
- (Japan) N Hirata
16
21
19

- (Denmark) K Astrup Sorensen
21
18
21

PFQ
- (Hong Kong) Chan YL
- (Hong Kong) Lee CH
18
21
11

- (Denmark) M Christiansen
- (Denmark) D Daugaard
21
15
21

- (Denmark) M Christiansen
- (Denmark) D Daugaard
13
21
9

- (Denmark) K Astrup Sorensen
21
18
21

- (England) M Nottingham
- (England) H Towler
21
14
14

- (Denmark) K Astrup Sorensen
8
21
21

=== Bottom half ===
==== Section 3 ====
First round

Second round

Quarterfinals

- (Canada) A Liu
- (Canada) D Ng
21
21

- (France) L Constantin
- (France) M Lo Ying Ping
10
7

- (Canada) A Liu
- (Canada) D Ng
21
11
16

5
- (South Korea) Kim K-j
- (South Korea) Kim S-r
19
21
21

- (Poland) L Moreń
- (Poland) W Szkudlarczyk
16
13

5
- (South Korea) Kim G-j
- (South Korea) Kim S-r
21
21

5
- (South Korea) Kim K-j
- (South Korea) Kim S-r
20
26
18

4
- (Denmark) M Conrad-Petersen
- (Denmark) M Pieler Kolding
22
24
21

- (Germany) M Schwenger
- (Germany) J Zurwonne
15
21
21

- (France) B Careme
- (France) R Labar
21
18
18

- (Germany) M Schwenger
- (Germany) J Zurwonne
22
17
18

4
- (Denmark) M Conrad-Petersen
- (Denmark) M Pieler Kolding
20
21
21

Q2
- (Croatia) Z Đurkinjak
- (Croatia) Z Hölbling
10
17

4
- (Denmark) M Conrad-Petersen
- (Denmark) M Pieler Kolding
21
21

==== Section 4 ====
First round

Second round

Quarterfinals

PFQ
- (Germany) F Holzer
- (Germany) M Lamsfuss
10
21
12

Q4
- (Indonesia) B Angriawan
- (Indonesia) R Saputro
21
16
21

Q4
- (Indonesia) B Angriawan
- (Indonesia) R Saputro
21
21

7
- (Japan) T Kamura
- (Japan) K Sonoda
19
17

- (United States) P Chew
- (United States) S Pongnairat
8
12

7
- (Japan) T Kamura
- (Japan) K Sonoda
21
21

Q4
- (Indonesia) B Angriawan
- (Indonesia) R Saputro
10
16

2
- (Japan) H Endo
- (Japan) K Hayakawa
21
21

Q1
- (England) C Coles
- (Scotland) P Van Rietvelde
19
15

- (Chinese Taipei) Chen H-l
- (Chinese Taipei) Wang C-l
21
21

- (Chinese Taipei) Chen H-l
- (Chinese Taipei) Wang C-l
24
16
18

2
- (Japan) H Endo
- (Japan) K Hayakawa
22
21
21

PFQ
- (Scotland) R Blair
- (Japan) S Ikeda
21
16
15

2
- (Japan) H Endo
- (Japan) K Hayakawa
19
21
21

== Women's doubles ==
=== Seeds ===
1. (Japan) Misaki Matsutomo / Ayaka Takahashi (second round)
2. (Denmark) Christinna Pedersen / Kamilla Rytter Juhl (champion)
3. (Indonesia) Nitya Krishinda Maheswari / Greysia Polii (second round)
4. (South Korea) Lee So-hee / Shin Seung-chan (quarter-final)
5. (Netherlands) Eefje Muskens / Selena Piek (quarter-final)
6. (Japan) Shizuka Matsuo / Mami Naito (second round)
7. (Indonesia) Pia Zebadiah / Rizki Amelia Pradipta (withdrew)
8. (Malaysia) Vivian Hoo Kah Mun / Woon Khe Wei (semi-final)

=== Finals ===
Semifinals

Final

- (Indonesia) Della Destiara Haris
- (Indonesia) Rosyita Eka Putri Sari
21
15
21

8
- (Malaysia) Vivian Hoo Kah Mun
- (Malaysia) Woon Khe Wei
13
21
18

- (Indonesia) Della Destiara Haris
- (Indonesia) Rosyita Eka Putri Sari
18
21
9

2
- (Denmark) Christinna Pedersen
- (Denmark) Kamilla Rytter Juhl
21
17
21

- (South Korea) Jang Ye-na
- (South Korea) Yoo Hae-won
15
18

2
- (Denmark) Christinna Pedersen
- (Denmark) Kamilla Rytter Juhl
21
21

=== Top half ===
==== Section 1 ====
First round

Second round

Quarterfinals

1
- (Japan) M Matsutomo
- (Japan) A Takahashi
21
21

PFQ
- (South Korea) Kim S-y
- (South Korea) Go A-r
17
18

1
- (Japan) M Matsutomo
- (Japan) A Takahashi
19
21
17

- (Indonesia) D Haris
- (Indonesia) R Putri Sari
21
9
21

- (Russia) A Chervaykova
- (Russia) N Vislova
11
16

- (Indonesia) D Haris
- (Indonesia) R Putri Sari
21
21

- (Indonesia) D Haris
- (Indonesia) R Putri Sari
21
21

- (Thailand) J Kittiharakul
- (Thailand) R Prajongjai
14
16

PFQ
- (Germany) I Herttrich
- (Germany) B Michels
21
21

Q1
- (Germany) C Bott
- (Germany) J Karnott
15
19

PFQ
- (Germany) I Herttrich
- (Germany) B Michels
16
16

- (Thailand) J Kittiharakul
- (Thailand) R Prajongjai
21
21

- (Thailand) J Kittiharakul
- (Thailand) R Prajongjai
21
21

- (Netherlands) S Barning
- (Netherlands) I Tabeling
13
13

==== Section 2 ====
First round

Second round

Quarterfinals

4
- (South Korea) Lee S-h
- (South Korea) Shin S-c
21
21

- (England) S Brown
- (England) K Robertshaw
7
14

4
- (South Korea) Lee S-h
- (South Korea) Shin S-c
21
21

- (India) J Gutta
- (India) A Ponnappa
8
10

- (Indonesia) S Andini
- (Indonesia) M Giovani
17
16

- (India) J Gutta
- (India) A Ponnappa
21
21

4
- (South Korea) Lee S-h
- (South Korea) Shin S-c
16
7

8
- (Malaysia) V Hoo
- (Malaysia) Woon KW
21
21

8
- (Malaysia) V Hoo
- (Malaysia) Woon KW
21
11
21

- (Japan) A Kurihara
- (Japan) N Shinoya
18
21
18

8
- (Malaysia) V Hoo
- (Malaysia) Woon KW
21
21

- (Chinese Taipei) Hsu Y-c
- (Chinese Taipei) Pai Y-p
13
14

- (Chinese Taipei) Hsu Y-c
- (Chinese Taipei) Pai Y-p
21
21

Q2
- (France) L Baumann
- (France) A Fontaine
9
14

=== Bottom half ===
==== Section 3 ====
First round

Second round

Quarterfinals

- (South Korea) Jang Y-n
- (South Korea) Yoo H-w
21
24

PFQ
- (France) D Lansac
- (France) E Lefel
10
22

- (South Korea) Jang Y-n
- (South Korea) Yoo H-w
21
21

6
- (Japan) S Matsuo
- (Japan) M Naito
19
13

Q3
- (Indonesia) K Dewi
- (Indonesia) J Gozali
12
14

6
- (Japan) S Matsuo
- (Japan) M Naito
21
21

- (South Korea) Jang Y-n
- (South Korea) Yoo H-w
24
21

- (South Korea) Chae Y-j
- (South Korea) Jung K-e
22
19

- (Thailand) P Supajirakul
- (Thailand) S Taerattanachai
15
15

- (South Korea) Chae Y-j
- (South Korea) Jung K-e
21
21

- (South Korea) Chae Y-j
- (South Korea) Jung K-e
21
21

3
- (Indonesia) N Maheswari
- (Indonesia) G Polii
17
16

PFQ
- (Ukraine) N Voytsekh
- (Ukraine) Y Zharka
15
7

3
- (Indonesia) N Maheswari
- (Indonesia) G Polii
21
21

==== Section 4 ====
First round

Second round

Quarterfinals

- (Russia) E Bolotova
- (Russia) E Kosetskaya
8
21
21

- (United States) E Lee
- (United States) P Obanana
21
11
18

- (Russia) E Bolotova
- (Russia) E Kosetskaya
10
6

5
- (Netherlands) E Muskens
- (Netherlands) S Piek
21
21

- (Germany) J Goliszewski
- (Germany) C Nelte
16
17

5
- (Netherlands) E Muskens
- (Netherlands) S Piek
21
21

5
- (Netherlands) E Muskens
- (Netherlands) S Piek
18
15

2
- (Denmark) C Pedersen
- (Denmark) K Rytter Juhl
21
21

- (Hong Kong) Chan TK
- (Hong Kong) Tse YS
21
21

- (England) H Olver
- (England) L Smith
11
19

- (Hong Kong) Chan TK
- (Hong Kong) Tse YS
8
6

2
- (Denmark) C Pedersen
- (Denmark) K Rytter Juhl
21
21

Q4
- (Germany) L Efler
- (Germany) L Kaepplein
9
13

2
- (Denmark) C Pedersen
- (Denmark) K Rytter Juhl
21
21

== Mixed doubles ==
=== Seeds ===
1. (Denmark) Joachim Fischer Nielsen / Christinna Pedersen (final)
2. (South Korea) Ko Sung-hyun / Kim Ha-na (first round)
3. (England) Chris Adcock / Gabrielle Adcock (semi-final)
4. (Germany) Michael Fuchs / Birgit Michels (quarter-final)
5. (Thailand) Sudket Prapakamol / Saralee Thoungthongkam (first round)
6. (Denmark) Mads Pieler Kolding / Kamilla Rytter Juhl (champion)
7. (Singapore) Danny Bawa Chrisnanta / Vanessa Neo Yu Yan (withdrew)
8. (Hong Kong) Lee Chun Hei / Chau Hoi Wah (first round)

=== Finals ===
Semifinals

Final

1
- (Denmark) Joachim Fischer Nielsen
- (Denmark) Christinna Pedersen
21
21

3
- (England) Chris Adcock
- (England) Gabrielle Adcock
17
16

1
- (Denmark) Joachim Fischer Nielsen
- (Denmark) Christinna Pedersen
18
17

6
- (Denmark) Mads Pieler Kolding
- (Denmark) Kamilla Rytter Juhl
21
21

- (Republic of Ireland) Sam Magee
- (Republic of Ireland) Chloe Magee
6
12

6
- (Denmark) Mads Pieler Kolding
- (Denmark) Kamilla Rytter Juhl
21
21

=== Top half ===
==== Section 1 ====
First round

Second round

Quarterfinals

1
- (Denmark) J Fischer Nielsen
- (Denmark) C Pedersen
11

- (Japan) K Hayakawa
- (Japan) M Matsutomo
7^{r}

1
- (Denmark) J Fischer Nielsen
- (Denmark) C Pedersen
21
21

PFQ
- (Sweden) J Nordh
- (Sweden) E Fabbeke
17
13

Q1
- (France) B Careme
- (Switzerland) S Jaquet
wo

PFQ
- (Sweden) J Nordh
- (Sweden) E Fabbeke

1
- (Denmark) J Fischer Nielsen
- (Denmark) C Pedersen
21
21

- (Indonesia) R Alexander
- (Indonesia) M Oktaviani
13
19

PFQ
- (Indonesia) A Wirawan
- (Indonesia) J Gozali
6
17

- (Indonesia) R Alexander
- (Indonesia) M Oktaviani
21
21

- (Indonesia) R Alexander
- (Indonesia) M Oktaviani
21
21

Q2
- (Indonesia) F Kurniawan
- (Indonesia) K Dewi
12
18

- (France) R Labar
- (France) E Lefel
25
27
19

Q2
- (Indonesia) F Kurniawan
- (Indonesia) K Dewi
27
25
21

==== Section 2 ====
First round

Second round

Quarterfinals

3
- (England) C Adcock
- (England) G Adcock
21
19
21

- (Russia) V Durkin
- (Russia) N Vislova
13
21
19

3
- (England) C Adcock
- (England) G Adcock
21
21

Q3
- (Russia) V Ivanov
- (India) A Ponnappa
19
15

- (Germany) M Schwenger
- (Germany) C Nelte
13
21
19

Q3
- (Russia) V Ivanov
- (India) A Ponnappa
21
18
21

3
- (England) C Adcock
- (England) G Adcock
21
16
21

- (South Korea) Kim K-j
- (South Korea) Shin S-c
7
21
14

8
- (Hong Kong) Lee CH
- (Hong Kong) Chau HW
22
21

- (South Korea) Kim K-j
- (South Korea) Shin S-c
24
23

- (South Korea) Kim K-j
- (South Korea) Shin S-c
21
21

- (Denmark) N Nohr
- (Denmark) S Thygesen
15
15

- (Netherlands) J de Ruiter
- (Netherlands) S Barning
20
18

- (Denmark) N Nohr
- (Denmark) S Thygesen
22
21

=== Bottom half ===
==== Section 3 ====
First round

Second round

Quarterfinals

- (Russia) A Yartsev
- (Russia) E Kosetskaya
17
11

- (Republic of Ireland) S Magee
- (Republic of Ireland) C Magee
21
21

- (Republic of Ireland) S Magee
- (Republic of Ireland) C Magee
21
21

- (Malaysia) Tan AQ
- (Malaysia) Lai PJ
13
14

- (Malaysia) Tan AQ
- (Malaysia) Lai PJ
25
21

5
- (Thailand) S Prapakamol
- (Thailand) S Thoungthongkam
23
19

- (Republic of Ireland) S Magee
- (Republic of Ireland) C Magee
15
21
21

4
- (Germany) M Fuchs
- (Germany) B Michels
21
14
16

- (South Korea) Choi S-k
- (South Korea) Chae Y-j
21
21

- (United States) P Chew
- (United States) J Subandhi
13
15

- (South Korea) Choi S-k
- (South Korea) Chae Y-j
15
21
18

4
- (Germany) M Fuchs
- (Germany) B Michels
21
14
21

- (Netherlands) J Arends
- (Netherlands) S Piek
19
21
15

4
- (Germany) M Fuchs
- (Germany) B Michels
21
10
21

==== Section 4 ====
First round

Second round

Quarterfinals

- (Germany) P Kaesbauer
- (Germany) I Herttrich
21
21

Q4
- (Germany) R Beck
- (Germany) K Kattenbeck
14
9

- (Germany) P Kaesbauer
- (Germany) I Herttrich
14
16

6
- (Denmark) M Pieler Kolding
- (Denmark) K Rytter Juhl
21
21

- (France) G Mittelheisser
- (France) A Fontaine
18
17

6
- (Denmark) M Pieler Kolding
- (Denmark) K Rytter Juhl
21
21

6
- (Denmark) M Pieler Kolding
- (Denmark) K Rytter Juhl
17
21
21

- (Hong Kong) Chan YL
- (Hong Kong) Tse YS
21
16
16

- (Russia) E Dremin
- (Russia) E Dimova
18
21
15

- (Indonesia) E Subaktiar
- (Indonesia) G Widjaja
21
18
21

- (Indonesia) E Subaktiar
- (Indonesia) G Widjaja
15
21
14

- (Hong Kong) Chan YL
- (Hong Kong) Tse YS
21
13
21

- (Hong Kong) Chan YL
- (Hong Kong) Tse YS
21
15
21

2
- (South Korea) Ko S-h
- (South Korea) Kim H-n
15
21
16

| Preceded by 2015 Syed Modi International Grand Prix Gold | BWF Grand Prix and Grand Prix Gold; 2015 BWF season | Succeeded by 2015 Swiss Open Grand Prix Gold |
