= 2015 Swiss Open Grand Prix Gold =

Tournament details
- Dates: March 10, 2015 - March 15, 2015
- Level: Grand Prix Gold
- Total prize money: US$120,000
- Venue: St. Jakobshalle
- Location: Basel, Switzerland

Champions
- Men's singles: (India) Srikanth Kidambi
- Women's singles: (China) Sun Yu
- Men's doubles: (China) Cai Yun (China) Lu Kai
- Women's doubles: (China) Bao Yixin (China) Tang Yuanting
- Mixed doubles: (China) Lu Kai (China) Huang Yaqiong

The 2015 Swiss Open Grand Prix Gold was the Fourth grand prix gold and grand prix tournament of the 2015 BWF Grand Prix and Grand Prix Gold. The tournament was held in St. Jakobshalle, Basel, Switzerland from March 10–15, 2015 and had a total purse of $120,000.

== Men's singles ==
=== Seeds ===
1. (India) Srikanth Kidambi (champion)
2. (Denmark) Viktor Axelsen (final)
3. (Indonesia) Tommy Sugiarto (withdrew)
4. (China) Tian Houwei (second round)
5. (Hong Kong) Hu Yun (first round)
6. (England) Rajiv Ouseph (withdrew)
7. (Chinese Taipei) Hsu Jen-hao (quarter-final)
8. (Japan) Takuma Ueda (quarter-final)
9. (Malaysia) Chong Wei Feng (withdrew)
10. (Hong Kong) Ng Ka Long (third round)
11. (Japan) Riichi Takeshita (second round)
12. (India) Sai Praneeth (third round)
13. (Chinese Taipei) Wang Tzu-wei (third round)
14. (Indonesia) Andre Kurniawan Tedjono (third round)
15. (Sweden) Henri Hurskainen (withdrew)
16. (India) Anand Pawar (third round)

=== Finals ===
Quarterfinals
1	(India) Srikanth Kidambi	21	21
8	(Japan) Takuma Ueda	11	12
(Japan) Kazumasa Sakai	21	21	15
(India) Ajay Jayaram	17	23	21
(Indonesia) Jonatan Christie	17	10
(China) Xue Song	21	21
7	(Chinese Taipei) Hsu Jen-hao	13	12
2	(Denmark) Viktor Axelsen	21	21

Semifinals
1	(India) Srikanth Kidambi	17	21	21
(India) Ajay Jayaram	21	15	18
(China) Xue Song	16	15
2	(Denmark) Viktor Axelsen	21	21

Final
1	(India) Srikanth Kidambi	21	12	21
2	(Denmark) Viktor Axelsen	15	21	14

=== Top half ===
==== Section 1 ====
First round
1	(India) S Kidambi	21	21
(France) L Corvée	18	10
(Netherlands) E Pang	16	21	7
(Germany) D Domke	21	18	21
PFR	(Switzerland) K Schaffluetzel	13	19
PFR	(Republic of Ireland) J Magee	21	21
(Denmark) E Holst	0
(Germany) L Schaenzler	1^{r}

Second round
1	(India) S Kidambi	21	21
(Germany) D Domke	10	14
PFR	(Republic of Ireland) J Magee	16	10
(Denmark) E Holst	21	21

Third round
1	(India) S Kidambi	14	21	21
(Denmark) E Holst	21	15	18

==== Section 2 ====
First round
8	(Japan) T Ueda	21	21
PFR	(France) G-Urban Samson	9	9
(Sweden) M Borg	15	21
(England) T Penty	21	23
14	(Indonesia) A Tedjono	19	21	21
PFR	(Switzerland) N Lenggenhager	21	11	8
(Denmark) K Bruun	14	21	15
(Switzerland) A Dumartheray	21	16	21

Second round
8	(Japan) T Ueda	21	21
(England) T Penty	14	17
14	(Indonesia) A Tedjono	21	21
(Switzerland) A Dumartheray	9	13

Third round
8	(Japan) T Ueda	21	21
14	(Indonesia) A Tedjono	16	19

==== Section 3 ====
First round
4	(China) Tian HW	21	21
(Malaysia) Soo TZ	14	5
(Poland) A Dziolko	18	11
(Japan) K Sakai	21	21
16	(India) A Pawar	21	21
PFR	(Switzerland) J Koenig	11	13
(Austria) M Almer	19	13
(Malaysia) L Daren	21	21

Second round
4	(China) Tian HW	18	13
(Japan) K Sakai	21	21
16	(India) A Pawar	13	22	21
(Malaysia) L Daren	21	20	16

Third round
(Japan) K Sakai	19	21	21
16	(India) A Pawar	21	19	15

==== Section 4 ====
First round
5	(Hong Kong) Hu Y	7	7
(India) A Jayaram	21	21
(Ukraine) A Pochtarov	12	15
(Belgium) Y Tan	21	21
13	(Chinese Taipei) Wang T-w	21	21
(Indonesia) S Kuncoro	11	12
(France) Y Turlan	22	15
(Czech Republic) M Ludík	24	21

Second round
(India) A Jayaram	21	21	21
(Belgium) Y Tan	7	23	19
13	(Chinese Taipei) Wang T-w	21	21
(Czech Republic) M Ludík	12	16

Third round
(India) A Jayaram	21	21
13	(Chinese Taipei) Wang T-w	17	16

=== Bottom half ===
==== Section 5 ====
First round
(Indonesia) J Christie	21	21
(France) T Rouxel	15	13
PFR	(France) R Gueguin	7	9
11	(Japan) R Takeshita	21	21
(France) L Claerbout	14	21	21
(Poland) M Rogalski	21	19	15
(Malaysia) Zf Zulkiffli	21	21
PFR	(Germany) P Discher	15	14

Second round
(Indonesia) J Christie	21	21
11	(Japan) R Takeshita	12	17
(France) L Claerbout	8	10
(Malaysia) Zf Zulkiffli	21	21

Third round
(Indonesia) J Christie	16	21	21
(Malaysia) Zf Zulkiffli	21	18	13

==== Section 6 ====
First round
(Denmark) F Quach	21	21
(Belgium) M Moreels	18	16
(Germany) F Roth	21	21
PFR	(Switzerland) Y Freysinger	8	6
(Bulgaria) S Makarski	21	13	21
(Switzerland) C Kirchmayr	17	21	16
(China) Xue S	21	21
PFR	(Switzerland) S Manjaly	7	4

Second round
(Denmark) F Quach	21	21
(Germany) F Roth	14	12
(Bulgaria) S Makarski	10	12
(China) Xue S	21	21

Third round
(Denmark) F Quach	18	17
(China) Xue S	21	21

==== Section 7 ====
First round
(Malaysia) B Wong	21	18	21
(Czech Republic) P Koukal	18	21	15
(Croatia) L Zdenjak	9	9
12	(India) S Praneeth	21	21
(Indonesia) I Mustofa	14	22	19
(Denmark) C Thomsen	21	20	21
(Switzerland) M Bony	6	10
7	(Chinese Taipei) Hsu J-h	21	21

Second round
(Malaysia) B Wong	11	13
12	(India) S Praneeth	21	21
(Denmark) C Thomsen	12	21
7	(Chinese Taipei) Hsu J-h	21	23

Third round
12	(India) S Praneeth	18	12
7	(Chinese Taipei) Hsu J-h	21	21

==== Section 8 ====
First round
(Chinese Taipei) Hsueh H-y	21	21
(Germany) T Wadenka	9	10
(Netherlands) E Meijs	12	21
10	(Hong Kong) Ng KL	21	23
(Malaysia) A Abdul Latif	21	21
(Ukraine) D Zavadsky	9	18
(Finland) K Lehikoinen	14	14
2	(Denmark) V Axelsen	21	21

Second round
(Chinese Taipei) Hsueh H-y	12	12
10	(Hong Kong) Ng KL	21	21
(Malaysia) A Abdul Latif	10	5^{r}
2	(Denmark) V Axelsen	21	14

Third round
10	(Hong Kong) Ng KL	15	10
2	(Denmark) V Axelsen	21	21

== Women's singles ==
=== Seeds ===
1. (China) Wang Yihan (quarter-final)
2. (India) P. V. Sindhu (withdrew)
3. (Japan) Sayaka Takahashi (semi-final)
4. (Canada) Michelle Li (quarter-final)
5. (Japan) Akane Yamaguchi (semi-final)
6. (China) Sun Yu (champion)
7. (Thailand) Nitchaon Jindapol (quarter-final)
8. (Thailand) Busanan Ongbumrungpan (final)

=== Finals ===
Semifinals
8	(Thailand) Busanan Ongbamrungphan	24	21
5	(Japan) Akane Yamaguchi	22	17
3	(Japan) Sayaka Takahashi	19	22	12
6	(China) Sun Yu	21	20	21

Final
8	(Thailand) Busanan Ongbamrungphan	16	12
6	(China) Sun Yu	21	21

=== Top half ===
==== Section 1 ====
First round
1	(China) Wang YH	21	21
(Japan) K Imabeppu	16	12
PFQ	(England) F Chapman	16	15
(France) S Vignes Waran	21	21
8	(Thailand) B Ongbamrungphan	21	21
(Indonesia) L Fanetri	8	10
(Republic of Ireland) C Magee	19	21	21
PFQ	(France) D Lansac	21	17	6

Second round
1	(China) Wang YH	21	21
(France) S Vignes Waran	6	16
8	(Thailand) B Ongbamrungphan	21	21
(Republic of Ireland) C Magee	10	17

Quarterfinals
1	(China) Wang YH	13	15
8	(Thailand) B Ongbamrungphan	21	21

==== Section 2 ====
First round
4	(Canada) M Li	21	15	21
(Czech Republic) K Gavnholt	10	21	18
(Denmark) L Kjærsfeldt	20	15
(United States) I Wang	22	21
5	(Japan) A Yamaguchi	21	21
Q2	(Germany) F Deprez	15	17
(Russia) K Polikarpova	1
(Switzerland) S Jaquet	2^{r}

Second round
4	(Canada) M Li	21	21
(United States) I Wang	17	19
5	(Japan) A Yamaguchi	21	21
(Russia) K Polikarpova	12	12

Quarterfinals
4	(Canada) M Li	8	21	12
5	(Japan) A Yamaguchi	21	15	21

=== Bottom half ===
==== Section 3 ====
First round
(Russia) N Perminova	16	17
(Bulgaria) S Stoeva	21	21
(Indonesia) B Manuputty	13	17
7	(Thailand) N Jindapol	21	21
(Bulgaria) P Nedelcheva	21	21
Q3	(Mauritius) K Kune	11	3
(Germany) K Schnaase	19	21	13
3	(Japan) S Takahashi	21	18	21

Second round
(Bulgaria) S Stoeva	4^{r}
7	(Thailand) N Jindapol	11
(Bulgaria) P Nedelcheva	17	9
3	(Japan) S Takahashi	21	21

Quarterfinals
7	(Thailand) N Jindapol	19	10
3	(Japan) S Takahashi	21	21

==== Section 4 ====
First round
Q1	(Finland) N Vainio	20	13
(Chinese Taipei) Hsu Y-c	22	21
(Japan) S Sato	20	21	10
6	(China) Sun Y	22	19	21
(Scotland) K Gilmour	21	21
Q4	(Japan) A Ohori	16	14
(Thailand) P Buranaprasertsuk	21	21
PFQ	(Japan) Y Hashimoto	12	11

Second round
(Chinese Taipei) Hsu Y-c	11	7
6	(China) Sun Y	21	21
(Scotland) K Gilmour	12	15
(Thailand) P Buranaprasertsuk	21	21

Quarterfinals
6	(China) Sun Y	21	21
(Thailand) P Buranaprasertsuk	11	5

== Men's doubles ==
=== Seeds ===
1. (Denmark) Mads Conrad-Petersen / Mads Pieler Kolding (withdrew)
2. (Germany) Michael Fuchs / Johannes Schöttler (withdrew)
3. (China) Cai Yun / Lu Kai (champion)
4. (Denmark) Kim Astrup / Anders Skaarup Rasmussen (quarter-final)
5. (Poland) Adam Cwalina / Przemysław Wacha (second round)
6. (Malaysia) Goh V Shem / Tan Wee Kiong (final)
7. (Indonesia) Marcus Fernaldi Gideon / Kevin Sanjaya Sukamuljo (semi-final)
8. (Germany) Max Schwenger / Josche Zurwonne (semi-final)

=== Finals ===
Semifinals

Final

8
- (Germany) Max Schwenger
- (Germany) Josche Zurwonne
18
8

3
- (China) Cai Yun
- (China) Lu Kai
21
21

3
- (China) Cai Yun
- (China) Lu Kai
21
14
21

6
- (Malaysia) Goh V Shem
- (Malaysia) Tan Wee Kiong
19
21
17

6
- (Malaysia) Goh V Shem
- (Malaysia) Tan Wee Kiong
21
21

7
- (Indonesia) Marcus Fernaldi Gideon
- (Indonesia) Kevin Sanjaya Sukamuljo
19
19

=== Top half ===
==== Section 1 ====
First round

Second round

Quarterfinals

PFQ
- (Republic of Ireland) J Magee
- (Republic of Ireland) S Magee
15
13

- (Japan) K Kazuno
- (Japan) K Yamada
21
21

- (Japan) K Kazuno
- (Japan) K Yamada
21
19
22

- (Chinese Taipei) Lin C-y
- (Chinese Taipei) Wu H-l
17
21
20

PFQ
- (Philippines) P Magneye
- (Philippines) P Vivas
21
16
13

- (Chinese Taipei) Lin C-y
- (Chinese Taipei) Wu H-l
18
21
21

- (Japan) K Kazuno
- (Japan) K Yamada
15
21
19

8
- (Germany) M Schwenger
- (Germany) J Zurwonne
21
18
21

8
- (Germany) M Schwenger
- (Germany) J Zurwonne
21
21

Q3
- (Switzerland) A Ruhanda
- (Indonesia) S D Kusumah
12
14

8
- (Germany) M Schwenger
- (Germany) J Zurwonne
21
21

- (Indonesia) A Adistia
- (Indonesia) H Gunawan
19
19

- (Indonesia) A Adistia
- (Indonesia) H Gunawan
20
21
21

Q1
- (Canada) P Charron
- (Canada) T Ng
22
18
17

==== Section 2 ====
First round

Second round

Quarterfinals

3
- (China) Cai Y
- (China) Lu K
21
21

Q4
- (Indonesia) M Kido
- (Indonesia) A Putra
12
16

3
- (China) Cai Y
- (China) Lu K
17
21
21

- (Indonesia) A Pratama
- (Indonesia) R Suwardi
21
18
15

- (India) P Chopra
- (India) A Dewalkar
17
13

- (Indonesia) A Pratama
- (Indonesia) R Suwardi
21
21

3
- (China) Cai Y
- (China) Lu K
21
21

- (England) A Ellis
- (England) P Mills
10
14

5
- (Poland) A Cwałina
- (Poland) P Wacha
21
21

- (France) B Carême
- (France) R Labar
17
18

5
- (Poland) A Cwałina
- (Poland) P Wacha
21
19
19

- (England) A Ellis
- (England) P Mills
16
21
21

- (Denmark) M Christiansen
- (Denmark) D Daugaard
21
18

- (England) A Ellis
- (England) P Mills
23
21

=== Bottom half ===
==== Section 3 ====
First round

Second round

Quarterfinals

- (Indonesia) W Nayaka
- (Indonesia) A Yusuf
21
18
21

- (India) M Attri
- (India) B Sumeeth Reddy
18
21
16

- (Indonesia) W Nayaka
- (Indonesia) A Yusuf
15
13

7
- (Indonesia) M F Gideon
- (Indonesia) K S Sukamuljo
21
21

- (France) B Kersaudy
- (France) G Mittelheisser
21
11
19

7
- (Indonesia) M F Gideon
- (Indonesia) K S Sukamuljo
18
21
21

7
- (Indonesia) M F Gideon
- (Indonesia) K S Sukamuljo
22
19
21

4
- (Denmark) K Astrup
- (Denmark) A Skaarup Rasmussen
20
21
17

- (Poland) L Moreń
- (Poland) W Szkudlarczyk
17
7

- (Chinese Taipei) Chen H-l
- (Chinese Taipei) Wang C-l
21
21

- (Chinese Taipei) Chen H-l
- (Chinese Taipei) Wang C-l
19
21
21

4
- (Denmark) K Astrup
- (Denmark) A Skaarup Rasmussen
21
11
23

- (Netherlands) J Arends
- (Netherlands) J Maas
17
15

4
- (Denmark) K Astrup
- (Denmark) A Skaarup Rasmussen
21
21

==== Section 4 ====
First round

Second round

Quarterfinals

- (England) M Nottingham
- (England) H Towler
21
24

- (Scotland) R Blair
- (Japan) S Ikeda
16
22

- (England) M Nottingham
- (England) H Towler
17
20

6
- (Malaysia) Goh VS
- (Malaysia) Tan WK
21
22

- (Germany) R Beck
- (Germany) A Heinz
21
18
11

6
- (Malaysia) Goh VS
- (Malaysia) Tan WK
19
21
21

6
- (Malaysia) Goh VS
- (Malaysia) Tan WK
23
21

- (Japan) T Inoue
- (Japan) Y Kaneko
21
18

- (Germany) F Holzer
- (Germany) M Lamsfuß
19
16

Q2
- (England) C Coles
- (Scotland) P Van Rietvelde
21
21

Q2
- (England) C Coles
- (Scotland) P Van Rietvelde
21
15
16

- (Japan) T Inoue
- (Japan) Y Kaneko
18
21
21

- (Japan) T Inoue
- (Japan) Y Kaneko
21
21

PFQ
- (Philippines) P Escueta
- (Philippines) R Estanislao
12
13

== Women's doubles ==
=== Seeds ===
1. (Japan) Reika Kakiiwa / Miyuki Maeda (semi-final)
2. (Netherlands) Eefje Muskens / Selena Piek (semi-final)
3. (Japan) Shizuka Matsuo / Mami Naito (withdrew)
4. (Indonesia) Pia Zebadiah Bernadet / Rizki Amelia Pradipta (first round)
5. (China) Bao Yixin / Tang Yuanting (champion)
6. (Bulgaria) Gabriela Stoeva / Stefani Stoeva (quarter-final)
7. (India) Jwala Gutta / Ashwini Ponnappa (withdrew)
8. (Thailand) Puttita Supajirakul / Sapsiree Taerattanachai (second round)

=== Finals ===
Semifinals

Final

1
- (Japan) Reika Kakiiwa
- (Japan) Miyuki Maeda
14
21
12

- (Japan) Ayane Kurihara
- (Japan) Naru Shinoya
21
19
21

- (Japan) Ayane Kurihara
- (Japan) Naru Shinoya
6
21
17

5
- (China) Bao Yixin
- (China) Tang Yuanting
21
17
21

5
- (China) Bao Yixin
- (China) Tang Yuanting
21
19
21

2
- (Netherlands) Eefje Muskens
- (Netherlands) Selena Piek
12
21
17

=== Top half ===
==== Section 1 ====
First round

Second round

Quarterfinals

1
- (Japan) R Kakiiwa
- (Japan) M Maeda
21
21

PFQ
- (Germany) L Kaminski
- (Germany) H Pohl
11
6

1
- (Japan) R Kakiiwa
- (Japan) M Maeda
21
21

- (France) D Lansac
- (France) É Lefel
10
14

Q3
- (Indonesia) R Adistral
- (Indonesia) R Pancasari
11
18

- (France) D Lansac
- (France) É Lefel
21
21

1
- (Japan) R Kakiiwa
- (Japan) M Maeda
21
21

- (Japan) N Fukuman
- (Japan) K Yonao
18
19

8
- (Thailand) P Supajirakul
- (Thailand) S Taerattanachai
21
21

- (England) S Brown
- (England) K Robertshaw
14
11

8
- (Thailand) P Supajirakul
- (Thailand) S Taerattanachai
16
21
13

- (Japan) N Fukuman
- (Japan) K Yonao
21
15
21

- (Japan) N Fukuman
- (Japan) K Yonao
21
0

PFQ
- (Germany) K Kattenbeck
- (Germany) F Volkmann
10
0^{r}

==== Section 2 ====
First round

Second round

Quarterfinals

4
- (Indonesia) P Z Bernadet
- (Indonesia) R Pradipta
21
15
9

- (China) Tang JH
- (China) Zhong QX
16
21
21

- (China) Tang JH
- (China) Zhong QX
16
11

- (Japan) A Kurihara
- (Japan) N Shinoya
21
21

- (Japan) A Kurihara
- (Japan) N Shinoya
21
21

Q4
- (Switzerland) S Keller
- (Switzerland) Y Keller
6
12

- (Japan) A Kurihara
- (Japan) N Shinoya
21
21

6
- (Bulgaria) G Stoeva
- (Bulgaria) S Stoeva
14
16

6
- (Bulgaria) G Stoeva
- (Bulgaria) S Stoeva
21
21

- (Netherlands) S Barning
- (Netherlands) I Tabeling
10
12

6
- (Bulgaria) G Stoeva
- (Bulgaria) S Stoeva
21
23

- (Japan) S Tanaka
- (Japan) K Yonemoto
17
21

- (Chinese Taipei) Hsieh P-c
- (Chinese Taipei) Wu T-j
15
8

- (Japan) S Tanaka
- (Japan) K Yonemoto
21
21

=== Bottom half ===
==== Section 3 ====
First round

Second round

Quarterfinals

- (France) L Baumann
- (France) A Fontaine
21
21

- (Germany) C Bott
- (Germany) J Karnott
11
13

- (France) L Baumann
- (France) A Fontaine
15
6

5
- (China) Bao YX
- (China) Tang YT
21
21

Q2
- (Bulgaria) D Dimova
- (Switzerland) C Tripet
5
8

5
- (China) Bao YX
- (China) Tang YT
21
21

5
- (China) Bao YX
- (China) Tang YT
21
21

- (Thailand) J Kititharakul
- (Thailand) R Prajongjai
14
10

- (France) E Beaujean
- (France) J Chaube
13
13

- (Denmark) L Grebak
- (Denmark) M Helsbøl
21
21

- (Denmark) L Grebak
- (Denmark) M Helsbøl
21
15
12

- (Thailand) J Kititharakul
- (Thailand) R Prajongjai
15
21
21

- (Thailand) J Kititharakul
- (Thailand) R Prajongjai
21
21

PFQ
- (Switzerland) C Burkart
- (Switzerland) T Girona
8
5

==== Section 4 ====
First round

Second round

Quarterfinals

- (Canada) A Bruce
- (Canada) P Chan
20
22
17

- (Germany) J Goliszewski
- (Germany) C Nelte
22
20
21

- (Germany) J Goliszewski
- (Germany) C Nelte
16
21
16

- (Malaysia) A Anscelly
- (Malaysia) Soong FC
21
18
21

- (Malaysia) A Anscelly
- (Malaysia) Soong FC
21
21

PFQ
- (Estonia) K Kreet Marran
- (Estonia) S Liis Teesalu
12
12

- (Malaysia) A Anscelly
- (Malaysia) Soong FC
15
23
6

2
- (Netherlands) E Muskens
- (Netherlands) S Piek
21
21
21

- (Indonesia) D Fitriani
- (Indonesia) N Melati
10
19

- (England) H Olver
- (England) L Smith
21
21

- (England) H Olver
- (England) L Smith
13
16

2
- (Netherlands) E Muskens
- (Netherlands) S Piek
21
21

Q1
- (Switzerland) C Hantz
- (Switzerland) S Herzig
10
8

2
- (Netherlands) E Muskens
- (Netherlands) S Piek
21
21

== Mixed doubles ==
=== Seeds ===
1. (Indonesia) Tontowi Ahmad / Liliyana Natsir (semi-final)
2. (England) Chris Adcock / Gabby Adcock (quarter-final)
3. (China) Liu Cheng / Bao Yixin (final)
4. (Indonesia) Riky Widianto / Richi Puspita Dili (semi-final)
5. (China) Lu Kai / Huang Yaqiong (champion)
6. (Indonesia) Praveen Jordan / Debby Susanto (quarter-final)
7. (Thailand) Maneepong Jongjit / Sapsiree Taerattanachai (withdrew)
8. (Germany) Max Schwenger / Carla Nelte (first round)

=== Finals ===
Semifinals

Final

1
- (Indonesia) Tontowi Ahmad
- (Indonesia) Liliyana Natsir
19
19

3
- (China) Liu Cheng
- (China) Bao Yixin
21
21

3
- (China) Liu Cheng
- (China) Bao Yixin
21
20
13

5
- (China) Lu Kai
- (China) Huang Yaqiong
17
22
21

4
- (Indonesia) Riky Widianto
- (Indonesia) Richi Puspita Dili
16
13

5
- (China) Lu Kai
- (China) Huang Yaqiong
21
21

=== Top half ===
==== Section 1 ====
First round

Second round

Quarterfinals

1
- (Indonesia) T Ahmad
- (Indonesia) L Natsir
21
21

- (Canada) T Ng
- (Canada) A Bruce
6
16

1
- (Indonesia) T Ahmad
- (Indonesia) L Natsir
21
21

- (England) H Towler
- (England) E Westwood
13
11

- (Bulgaria) S Makarski
- (Switzerland) C Tripet
22
12
10

- (England) H Towler
- (England) E Westwood
20
21
21

1
- (Indonesia) T Ahmad
- (Indonesia) L Natsir
19
21
21

- (Netherlands) J Arends
- (Netherlands) S Piek
21
13
10

PFQ
- (Switzerland) O Schaller
- (Switzerland) C Burkart
13
18

PFQ
- (Germany) M Lamsfuß
- (Germany) F Volkmann
21
21

PFQ
- (Germany) M Lamsfuß
- (Germany) F Volkmann
11
19

- (Netherlands) J Arends
- (Netherlands) S Piek
21
21

- (Indonesia) M Kido
- (Indonesia) P Z Bernadet
15
21
13

- (Netherlands) J Arends
- (Netherlands) S Piek
21
14
21

==== Section 2 ====
First round

Second round

Quarterfinals

3
- (China) Liu C
- (China) Bao YX
21
21

PFQ
- (France) R Gueguin
- (France) J Chaube
7
3

3
- (China) Liu C
- (China) Bao YX
21
21

Q3
- (Indonesia) A Putra
- (Indonesia) R Pradipta
7
18

- (France) R Labar
- (France) É Lefel
24
15
8

Q3
- (Indonesia) A Putra
- (Indonesia) R Pradipta
22
21
21

3
- (China) Liu C
- (China) Bao YX
21
21

6
- (Indonesia) P Jordan
- (Indonesia) D Susanto
19
7

6
- (Indonesia) P Jordan
- (Indonesia) D Susanto
22
21

- (Germany) R Beck
- (Germany) K Kattenbeck
20
19

6
- (Indonesia) P Jordan
- (Indonesia) D Susanto
21
16
21

Q2
- (Chinese Taipei) Lin C-y
- (Chinese Taipei) Wu T-j
16
21
14

Q2
- (Chinese Taipei) Lin C-y
- (Chinese Taipei) Wu T-j
22
22
21

- (Sweden) J Nordh
- (Sweden) E Fabbeke
20
24
10

=== Bottom half ===
==== Section 3 ====
First round

Second round

Quarterfinals

- (France) G Mittelheisser
- (France) A Fontaine
21
21

Q1
- (Switzerland) G Tripet
- (Bulgaria) D Dimova
19
8

- (France) G Mittelheisser
- (France) A Fontaine
21
14
21

- (Netherlands) J de Ruiter
- (Netherlands) S Barning
13
21
18

- (Netherlands) J de Ruiter
- (Netherlands) S Barning
14
21
21

8
- (Germany) M Schwenger
- (Germany) C Nelte
21
12
17

- (France) G Mittelheisser
- (France) A Fontaine
21
17
11

4
- (Indonesia) R Widianto
- (Indonesia) R Dili
18
21
21

PFQ
- (Malaysia) Chan PS
- (Malaysia) Goh LY
21
21

Q4
- (Chinese Taipei) Wu H-l
- (Chinese Taipei) Hsieh P-c
13
13

PFQ
- (Malaysia) Chan PS
- (Malaysia) Goh LY
17
19

4
- (Indonesia) R Widianto
- (Indonesia) R Dili
21
21

- (Sweden) N Ruponen
- (Sweden) A Högström
13
13

4
- (Indonesia) R Widianto
- (Indonesia) R Dili
21
21

==== Section 4 ====
First round

Second round

Quarterfinals

- (Canada) P Charron
- (Canada) P Chan
10
11

- (Denmark) M Christiansen
- (Denmark) L Grebak
21
21

- (Denmark) M Christiansen
- (Denmark) L Grebak
18
11

5
- (China) Lu K
- (China) Huang YQ
21
21

- (Republic of Ireland) S Magee
- (Republic of Ireland) C Magee
14
14

5
- (China) Lu K
- (China) Huang YQ
21
21

5
- (China) Lu K
- (China) Huang YQ
23
21

2
- (England) C Adcock
- (England) G Adcock
21
14

- (England) C Coles
- (England) S Brown
17
21
21

- (France) B Kersaudy
- (France) L Baumann
21
8
18

- (England) C Coles
- (England) S Brown
10
9

2
- (England) C Adcock
- (England) G Adcock
21
21

- (Russia) E Dremin
- (Russia) E Dimova
17
23
14

2
- (England) C Adcock
- (England) G Adcock
21
21
21

Preceded by 2015 German Open Grand Prix Gold	BWF Grand Prix and Grand Prix Gold; 2015 BWF season	Succeeded by 2015 China Masters Grand Prix Gold
