= Badminton at the 2015 European Games – Men's doubles =

Badminton's men's doubles at the 2015 European Games
- Venue: Baku Sports Hall
- Dates: 22–27 June
- Competitors: 32 from 16 nations

Medalists
gold medal	Mathias Boe; Carsten Mogensen	Denmark
silver medal	Vladimir Ivanov; Ivan Sozonov	Russia
bronze medal	Raphael Beck; Andreas Heinz	Germany
bronze medal	Joshua Magee; Sam Magee	Ireland

The badminton men's doubles tournament at the 2015 European Games took place from 22 to 27 June.

== Competition format ==
The doubles tournaments will be played with 16 pairs, initially playing in four groups of four, before the top two from each group qualify for an 8-pair knock-out stage.

=== Schedule ===
All times are in AZST (UTC+05).

Start time	Session
22 June 9:00	Group stage, matchday 1
23 June 9:00	Group stage, matchday 2
24 June 9:00	Group stage, matchday 3
25 June 10:00	Quarter-finals
26 June 18:00	Semi-finals
27 June 18:00	Final

== Seeds ==
Seeds for all badminton events at the inaugural European Games were announced on 29 May.

1. Mathias Boe and Carsten Mogensen (DEN)
2. Vladimir Ivanov and Ivan Sozonov (RUS)
3. Raphael Beck and Andreas Heinz (GER)
4. Matijs Dierickx and Freek Golinski (BEL)

== Results ==
The group stage draws were held on 2 June.

=== Group stage ===
==== Group A ====
Pos	Team	Pld	W	L	GF	GA	GD	Qualification
1	Mathias Boe / Carsten Mogensen (DEN) [1]	3	3	0	6	0	+6	Qualification to knock-out stage
2	Joshua Magee / Sam Magee (IRL)	3	2	1	4	2	+2	Qualification to knock-out stage
3	Pavel Florián / Ondřej Kopřiva (CZE)	3	1	2	2	4	−2	
4	Angelo Silva / Ricardo Silva (POR)	3	0	3	0	6	−6	

Source: Baku 2015

==== Group B ====
Pos	Team	Pld	W	L	GF	GA	GD	Qualification
1	Vladimir Ivanov / Ivan Sozonov (RUS) [2]	3	3	0	6	0	+6	Qualification to knock-out stage
2	Bastian Kersaudy / Gaetan Mittelheisser (FRA)	3	2	1	4	2	+2	Qualification to knock-out stage
3	Emre Vural / Sinan Zorlu (TUR)	3	1	2	2	4	−2	
4	Orkhan Qalandarov / Kanan Rzayev (AZE)	3	0	3	0	6	−6	

Source: Baku 2015

==== Group C ====
Pos	Team	Pld	W	L	GF	GA	GD	Qualification
1	Raphael Beck / Andreas Heinz (GER) [3]	3	3	0	6	1	+5	Qualification to knock-out stage
2	Zvonimir Durkinjak / Zvonimir Hoelbling (CRO)	3	2	1	5	2	+3	Qualification to knock-out stage
3	Giovanni Greco / Rosario Maddaloni (ITA)	3	1	2	2	4	−2	
4	Povilas Bartušis / Alan Plavin (LTU)	3	0	3	0	6	−6	

Source: Baku 2015

==== Group D ====
Pos	Team	Pld	W	L	GF	GA	GD	Qualification
1	Matijs Dierickx / Freek Golinski (BEL) [4]	3	3	0	6	0	+6	Qualification to knock-out stage
2	Miłosz Bochat / Paweł Pietryja (POL)	3	2	1	4	2	+2	Qualification to knock-out stage
3	Gennadiy Natarov / Artem Pochtarev (UKR)	3	1	2	2	4	−2	
4	Lilian Mihaylov / Mihael Mihaylov (BUL)	3	0	3	0	6	−6	

Source: Baku 2015

=== Knock-out stage ===
Quarter-finals
1	M Boe; C Mogensen (DEN)	21	21
B Kersaudy; G Mittelheisser (FRA)	16	17
3	R Beck; A Heinz (GER)	21	13	21
M Bochat; P Pietryja (POL)	18	21	12
J Magee; S Magee (IRL)	23	19	21
4	M Dierickx; F Golinski (BEL)	21	21	15
Z Durkinjak; Z Hoelbling (CRO)	12	13
2	V Ivanov; I Sozonov (RUS)	21	21

Semi-finals
1	M Boe; C Mogensen (DEN)	21	21
3	Raphael Beck; A Heinz (GER)	18	17
J Magee; S Magee (IRL)	5	9
2	V Ivanov; I Sozonov (RUS)	21	21

Final
1	M Boe; C Mogensen (DEN)	21	21
2	V Ivanov; I Sozonov (RUS)	8	13
