= 2014 Brasil Open Grand Prix =

Tournament details
- Dates: 5 August 2014– 10 August 2014
- Total prize money: US$50,000
- Venue: Comissão de Desporto da Aeronáutica (CDA)
- Location: Rio de Janeiro, Brazil

Champions
- Men's singles: (Republic of Ireland) Scott Evans
- Women's singles: (United States) Zhang Beiwen
- Men's doubles: (Germany) Max Schwenger (Germany) Josche Zurwonne
- Women's doubles: (Germany) Johanna Goliszewski (Germany) Carla Nelte
- Mixed doubles: (Germany) Max Schwenger (Germany) Carla Nelte

The 2014 Brasil Open Grand Prix was the eleventh grand prix badminton tournament of the 2014 BWF Grand Prix Gold and Grand Prix. The tournament was held in Gymnasium of Comissão de Desporto da Aeronáutica (CDA), Rio de Janeiro, Brazil from 5 until 10 August 2014 and had a total purse of $50,000. This tournament organized by Confederação Brasileira de Badminton (CBBd), and sanctioned from the BWF. The sponsor of this tournament was the Brazilian Air Force, and Yonex. 130 players from 27 countries competed at this tournament.

== Men's singles ==
=== Seeds ===
1. (Sweden) Henri Hurskainen (semifinals)
2. (Germany) Dieter Domke (finals)
3. (Cuba) Osleni Guerrero (semifinals)
4. (Republic of Ireland) Scott Evans (champion)
5. (United States) Sattawat Pongnairat (quarterfinals)
6. (Czech Republic) Petr Koukal (quarterfinals)
7. (Denmark) Joachim Persson (quarterfinals)
8. (Brazil) Daniel Paiola (quarterfinals)

=== Finals ===
Quarterfinals
1	(Sweden) Henri Hurskainen	11	6	11	11
7	(Denmark) Joachim Persson	3	11	7	6
4	(Republic of Ireland) Scott Evans	11	8	11	6	11
6	(Czech Republic) Petr Koukal	8	11	10	11	6
8	(Brazil) Daniel Paiola	9	11	11	5	6
3	(Cuba) Osleni Guerrero	11	3	10	11	11
5	(United States) Sattawat Pongnairat	11	6	10	10
2	(Germany) Dieter Domke	9	11	11	11

Semifinals
1	(Sweden) Henri Hurskainen	7	10	10
4	(Republic of Ireland) Scott Evans	11	11	11
3	(Cuba) Osleni Guerrero	6	11	9	11	4
2	(Germany) Dieter Domke	11	8	11	5	11

Final
4	(Republic of Ireland) Scott Evans	7	6	11	11	11
2	(Germany) Dieter Domke	11	11	6	8	7

== Women's singles ==
=== Seeds ===
1. (United States) Beiwen Zhang (champion)
2. (Bulgaria) Linda Zetchiri (withdrew)
3. (Germany) Karin Schnaase (quarterfinals)
4. (Republic of Ireland) Chloe Magee (second round)

=== Finals ===
Semifinals
1	(United States) Zhang Beiwen	6	8	11	11	11
(Japan) Sayaka Sato	11	11	5	6	7
(Japan) Kaori Imabeppu	11	11	11
(Switzerland) Sabrina Jaquet	7	5	8

Final
1	(United States) Zhang Beiwen	6	11	4	11	11
(Japan) Kaori Imabeppu	11	5	11	8	9

== Men's doubles ==
=== Seeds ===
1. (United States) Phillip Chew / Sattawat Pongnairat (second round)
2. (Belgium) Matijs Dierickx / Freek Golinski (semifinals)
3. (Italy) Giovanni Greco / Rosario Maddaloni (second round)

=== Finals ===
Semifinals
(Republic of Ireland) Joshua Magee (Republic of Ireland) Sam Magee	10	5	7
(Germany) Max Schwenger (Germany) Josche Zurwonne	11	11	11
(Germany) Raphael Beck (Germany) Andreas Heinz	11	11	11
2	(Belgium) Matijs Dierickx (Belgium) Freek Golinski	4	5	6

Final
(Germany) Max Schwenger (Germany) Josche Zurwonne	11	11	11
(Germany) Raphael Beck (Germany) Andreas Heinz	9	6	4

== Women's doubles ==
=== Seeds ===
1. (Bulgaria) Gabriela Stoeva / Stefani Stoeva (finals)
2. (United States) Eva Lee / Paula Lynn Obanana (semifinals)

=== Finals ===
Semifinals
1	(Bulgaria) Gabriela Stoeva (Bulgaria) Stefani Stoeva	11	11	11
(Brazil) Lohaynny Vicente (Brazil) Luana Vicente	5	6	7
(Germany) Johanna Goliszewski (Germany) Carla Nelte	11	7	11	11
2	(United States) Eva Lee (United States) Paula Lynn Obanana	8	11	9	5

Final
1	(Bulgaria) Gabriela Stoeva (Bulgaria) Stefani Stoeva	5	7	11	10
(Germany) Johanna Goliszewski (Germany) Carla Nelte	11	11	4	11

== Mixed doubles ==
=== Seeds ===
1. (Germany) Max Schwenger / Carla Nelte (champion)
2. (Republic of Ireland) Sam Magee / Chloe Magee (finals)
3. (United States) Phillip Chew / Jamie Subandhi (quarterfinals)
4. (Sweden) Nico Ruponen / Amanda Hogstrom (second round)

=== Finals ===
Semifinals
1	(Germany) Max Schwenger (Germany) Carla Nelte	11	11	11
(Denmark) Joachim Persson (Switzerland) Sabrina Jaquet	5	10	8
(Brazil) Alex Yuwan Tjong (Brazil) Lohaynny Vicente	9	1	2
2	(Republic of Ireland) Sam Magee (Republic of Ireland) Chloe Magee	11	11	11

Final
1	(Germany) Max Schwenger (Germany) Carla Nelte	10	10	11	11	11
2	(Republic of Ireland) Sam Magee (Republic of Ireland) Chloe Magee	11	11	10	8	7

Preceded by 2014 Russia Open Grand Prix	BWF Grand Prix Gold and Grand Prix; 2014 BWF Season	Succeeded by 2014 Vietnam Open Grand Prix
