= Badminton at the 2015 European Games – Mixed doubles =

Badminton's mixed doubles at the 2015 European Games
- Venue: Baku Sports Hall
- Dates: 22–28 June
- Competitors: 32 from 16 nations

Medalists
gold medal	Niclas Nøhr; Sara Thygesen	Denmark
silver medal	Gaetan Mittelheisser; Audrey Fontaine	France
bronze medal	Raphael Beck; Kira Kattenbeck	Germany
bronze medal	Sam Magee; Chloe Magee	Ireland

The badminton mixed doubles tournament at the 2015 European Games took place from 22 to 28 June.

== Competition format ==
The doubles tournaments will be played with 16 pairs, initially playing in four groups of four, before the top two from each group qualify for an 8-pair knock-out stage.

=== Schedule ===
All times are in AZST (UTC+05).

Start time	Session
22 June 9:00	Group stage, matchday 1
23 June 9:00	Group stage, matchday 2
25 June 9:00	Group stage, matchday 3
26 June 10:00	Quarter-finals
27 June 10:00	Semi-finals
28 June 14:00	Final

== Seeds ==
Seeds for all badminton events at the inaugural European Games were announced on 29 May.

1. Sam Magee and Chloe Magee (IRL)
2. Vitalij Durkin and Nina Vislova (RUS)
3. Niclas Nøhr and Sara Thygesen (DEN)
4. Gaetan Mittelheisser and Audrey Fontaine (FRA)

== Results ==
The group stage draws were held on 2 June.

=== Group stage ===
==== Group A ====
Pos	Team	Pld	W	L	GF	GA	GD	Qualification
1	Sam Magee / Chloe Magee (IRL) [1]	3	3	0	6	1	+5	Qualification to knock-out stage
2	Jakub Bitman / Alzbeta Basova (CZE)	3	2	1	5	2	+3	Qualification to knock-out stage
3	Povilas Bartusis / Vytaute Fomkinaite (LTU)	3	1	2	2	4	−2	
4	Samuel Cali / Fiorella Marie Sadowski (MLT)	3	0	3	0	6	−6	

Source: Baku 2015

==== Group B ====
Pos	Team	Pld	W	L	GF	GA	GD	Qualification
1	Vitalij Durkin / Nina Vislova (RUS) [2]	3	3	0	6	0	+6	Qualification to knock-out stage
2	Pawel Pietryja / Aneta Wojtkowska (POL)	3	2	1	4	2	+2	Qualification to knock-out stage
3	Oliver Schaller / Celine Burkart (SUI)	3	1	2	2	5	−3	
4	Floris Oleffe / Steffi Annys (BEL)	3	0	3	1	6	−5	

Source: Baku 2015

==== Group C ====
Pos	Team	Pld	W	L	GF	GA	GD	Qualification
1	Niclas Nøhr / Sara Thygesen (DEN) [3]	3	3	0	6	1	+5	Qualification to knock-out stage
2	Gennadiy Natarov / Yuliya Kazarinova (UKR)	3	2	1	5	3	+2	Qualification to knock-out stage
3	Melih Turgut / Fatma Nur Yavuz (TUR)	3	1	2	3	4	−1	
4	Primož Flis / Kaja Stanković (SLO)	3	0	3	0	6	−6	

Source: Baku 2015

==== Group D ====
Pos	Team	Pld	W	L	GF	GA	GD	Qualification
1	Gaetan Mittelheisser / Audrey Fontaine (FRA) [4]	3	3	0	6	0	+6	Qualification to knock-out stage
2	Raphael Beck / Kira Kattenbeck (GER)	3	2	1	4	2	+2	Qualification to knock-out stage
3	Gergely Krausz / Laura Sárosi (HUN)	3	1	2	2	4	−2	
4	Petros Tentas / Irini Tenta (GRE)	3	0	3	0	6	−6	

Source: Baku 2015

=== Knock-out stage ===
Quarter-finals
1	S Magee; C Magee (IRL)	21	21
P Pietryja; A Wojtkowska (POL)	18	12
4	G Mittelheisser; A Fontaine (FRA)	21	22	21
G Natarov; Y Kazarinova (UKR)	12	24	12
J Bitman; A Basova (CZE)	21	12
3	N Nøhr; S Thygesen (DEN)	23	21
R Beck; K Kattenbeck (GER)	21	21
2	V Durkin; N Vislova (RUS)	16	19

Semi-finals
1	S Magee; C Magee (IRL)	12	21
4	G Mittelheisser; A Fontaine (FRA)	21	23
3	N Nøhr; S Thygesen (DEN)	17	21	21
R Beck; K Kattenbeck (GER)	21	10	15

Final
4	G Mittelheisser; A Fontaine (FRA)	16	16
3	N Nøhr; S Thygesen (DEN)	21	21
