= Chloe Magee =

Irish badminton player

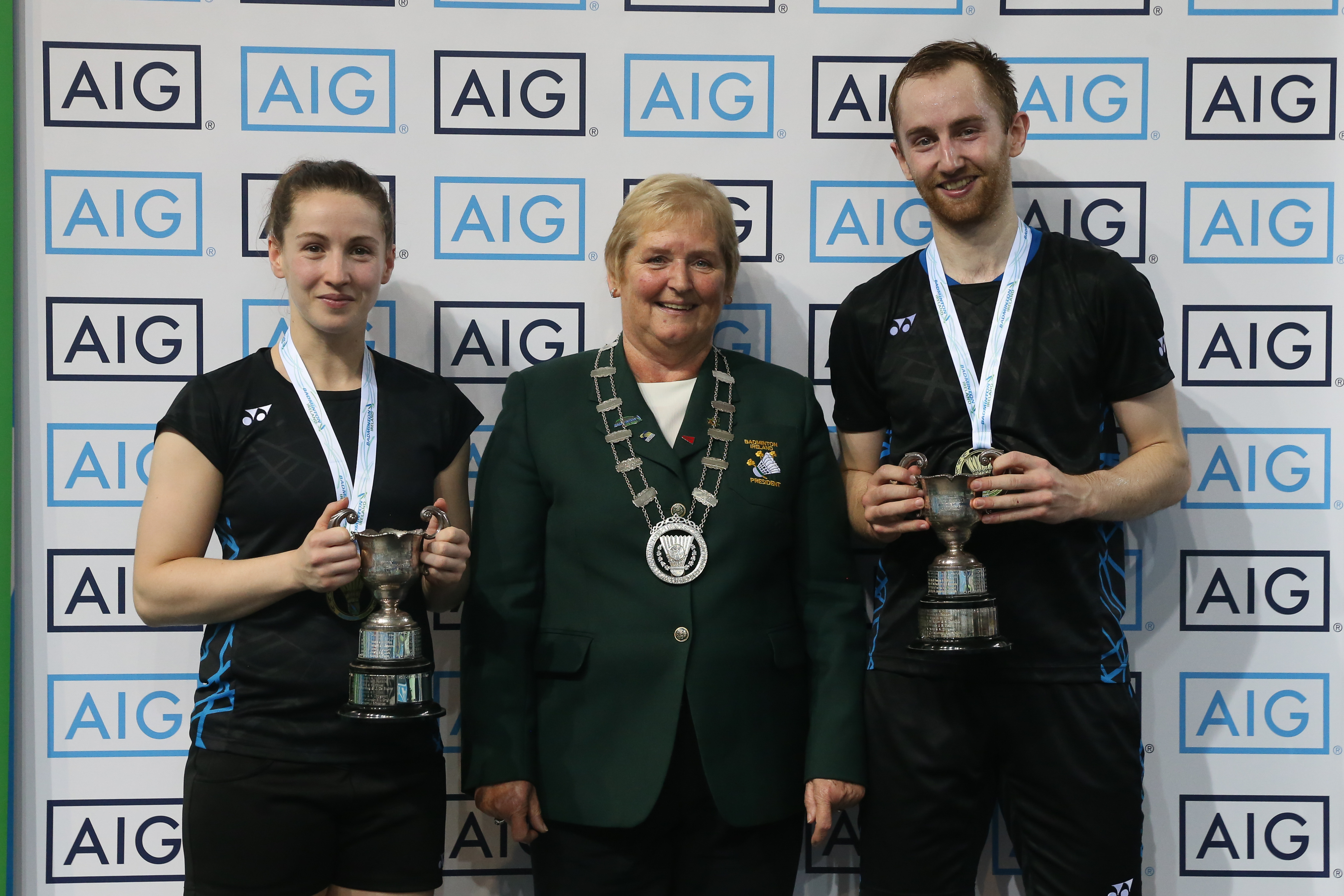
- Chloe and Sam Magee after winning the 2018 Irish Open

Personal information
- Born: Chloe Noelle Magee; 29 November 1988 (age 37) Raphoe, County Donegal, Ireland
- Height: 1.68 m (5 ft 6 in)
- Weight: 60 kg (132 lb)

Sport
- Country: Ireland
- Sport: Badminton
- Handedness: Right
- Coached by: Daniel Magee

Women's singles & doubles
- Tournaments played: 2008 Summer Olympics; 2012 Summer Olympics; 2016 Summer Olympics
- Highest ranking: 32 (WS 22 May 2014); 59 (WD with Bing Huang 21 January 2010); 21 (XD with Sam Magee 6 August 2015)
- Current ranking: 37 (XD with Sam Magee 3 May 2022)
- BWF profile
Medal record
Women's badminton
Representing Ireland
European Games
Bronze medal – third place	2015 Baku	Mixed doubles
Bronze medal – third place	2019 Minsk	Mixed doubles
European Championships
Bronze medal – third place	2017 Kolding	Mixed doubles

Chloe Noelle Magee (born 29 November 1988) is an Irish professional badminton player. She represented her country at the Olympic Games for three consecutive times in 2008 Beijing, 2012 London, and 2016 Rio de Janeiro. At the 2008 Summer Olympics in Beijing, she became the first Irish woman to win a badminton match at the Olympics. She has been described as "the poster girl for Irish badminton". Together with her brother Sam Magee, she clinched a bronze medal at the 2017 European Championships, claiming Ireland's first medal at the European Badminton Championship.

In addition to Sam, she also has two other brothers Daniel and Joshua who played at international level.

== Career ==
=== 2007 ===
In 2007, Magee won the women's doubles title at the Irish International Championships in Lisburn. Competing alongside Bing Huang, the pair beat second seeds Eva Lee and Mesinee Mangkalakiri of the United States 21–15, 9–21, 21–11 in the final.

=== 2008 Summer Olympics ===
Magee competed for Ireland at the 2008 Summer Olympics in Beijing, China at the age of 19. She became the first ever Irish woman to win a badminton match at the Olympics, beating Estonian Kati Tolmoff by a score of 18–21, 21–18, 21–19 in the first round of the women's singles. She was eliminated after losing her second round match 12–21, 14–21 to world number eleven Jun Jae-youn of South Korea. "I have loads to improve on and I will take away a lot from this," Magee said after the match.

=== 2009 ===
In 2009, Magee competed at the World Championships in Hyderabad, India, losing in the first round to Japanese number two Ai Goto by a score of 21–13, 21–9.

=== 2012 Summer Olympics ===
Magee, ranked 44th in the world, qualified for the women's singles at the 2012 Summer Olympics in London as the 26 ranked player on the list of participants. She was one of two Irish badminton players at the Games; Scott Evans competed in the men's singles. Magee and her brother Sam, ranked 40th in the world as a pairing, were third reserves for the mixed doubles event.

In July 2012, Magee reached the final of the White Nights pre-Olympic tournament held in Russia. She beat Slovakian Monika Fasungova, 21–17, 20–22, 21–5, in the quarter-finals and Russia's Romina Gabdullina, 21–15, 17–21, 21–15, in the semi-finals but finished runner-up after losing to Poland's Kamila Augustyn, 21–19, 14–21, 14–21, despite having a 10–6 lead in the final set.

A slight schedule change led to Magee starting her 2012 Olympic campaign against Egypt's Hadia Hosny at 20.17 (29 July) and France's Hongyan Pi at 20.32 (30 July).

Bill O'Herlihy sparked controversy while covering Chloe Magee's progress at the 2012 Summer Olympics by suggesting badminton was "a mainly Protestant sport". RTÉ confirmed it received complaints about O'Herlihy's sectarian remarks on live television. The remarks prompted Magee to inform Highland Radio: "We need to remember what the Olympics is all about. I don't think it is any different from any other sport. There are people here from all over the world and from many different religions."

She lost 16–21, 21–18, 21–14, to Hongyan Pi and exited the 2012 Summer Olympics.

In December 2012, Magee reached the final of the Turkish Open.

=== 2015 ===
With her brother Sam, she captured a bronze medal at the Badminton at the 2015 European Games.

=== 2016 Summer Olympics ===
In Rio at the 2016 Summer Olympics, she lost to Chinese player Wang Yihan 7-21 and 12–21, and lost to German Player Karin Schnaase 14–21 and 19–21, placing third in her group.

=== 2019 ===
Another bronze medal was secured with her brother at the 2019 European Games.

== Achievements ==
=== European Games ===
Mixed doubles
Year	Venue	Partner	Opponent	Score	Result
2015	Baku Sports Hall, Baku, Azerbaijan	(Republic of Ireland) Sam Magee	(France) Gaëtan Mittelheisser (France) Audrey Fontaine	12–21, 21–23	Bronze
2019	Falcon Club, Minsk, Belarus	(Republic of Ireland) Sam Magee	(United Kingdom) Chris Adcock (United Kingdom) Gabby Adcock	8–21, 18–21	Bronze

=== European Championships ===
Mixed doubles
Year	Venue	Partner	Opponent	Score	Result
2017	Sydbank Arena, Kolding, Denmark	(Republic of Ireland) Sam Magee	(Denmark) Joachim Fischer Nielsen (Denmark) Christinna Pedersen	14–21, 10–21	Bronze

=== BWF Grand Prix ===
The BWF Grand Prix had two levels, the Grand Prix and Grand Prix Gold. It was a series of badminton tournaments sanctioned by the Badminton World Federation (BWF) and played between 2007 and 2017.

Women's singles
Year	Tournament	Opponent	Score	Result
2008	U.S. Open	(United States) Lili Zhou	21–23, 16–21	(silver) Runner-up

Mixed doubles
Year	Tournament	Partner	Opponent	Score	Result
2014	Brasil Open	(Republic of Ireland) Sam Magee	(Germany) Max Schwenger (Germany) Carla Nelte	11–10, 11–10, 10–11, 8–11, 7–11	(silver) Runner-up

BWF Grand Prix Gold tournament
BWF Grand Prix tournament

=== BWF International Challenge/Series ===
Women's singles
Year	Tournament	Opponent	Score	Result
2010	Dutch International	(Denmark) Karina Jørgensen	22–20, 14–21, 12–21	(silver) Runner-up
2010	Bulgarian International	(Bulgaria) Petya Nedelcheva	17–21, 13–21	(silver) Runner-up
2011	Lithuanian International	(Iceland) Ragna Ingólfsdóttir	21–11, 23–21	(gold) Winner
2011	Norwegian International	(Bulgaria) Linda Zetchiri	19–21, 14–21	(silver) Runner-up
2012	White Nights	(Poland) Kamila Augustyn	21–19, 14–21, 14–21	(silver) Runner-up
2012	Irish International	(Denmark) Line Kjærsfeldt	21–23, 21–18, 18–21	(silver) Runner-up
2012	Turkey International	(France) Sashina Vignes Waran	21–18, 23–21	(gold) Winner
2014	Hellas International	(Bulgaria) Linda Zetchiri	13–21, 13–21	(silver) Runner-up

Women's doubles
Year	Tournament	Partner	Opponent	Score	Result
2007	North Shore City International	(Republic of Ireland) Bing Huang	(New Zealand) Catherine Moody (Vietnam) Lê Ngọc Nguyên Nhung	21–15, 16–21, 21–15	(gold) Winner
2007	Welsh International	(Republic of Ireland) Bing Huang	(England) Sarah Walker (England) Samantha Ward	21–11, 21–14	(gold) Winner
2007	Irish International	(Republic of Ireland) Bing Huang	(United States) Mesinee Mangkalakiri (United States) Eva Lee	21–15, 9–21, 21–11	(gold) Winner
2008	Slovak Open	(Republic of Ireland) Bing Huang	(Poland) Anna Narel (Poland) Natalia Pocztowiak	21–8, 21–13	(gold) Winner

Mixed doubles
Year	Tournament	Partner	Opponent	Score	Result
2010	Spanish Open	(Republic of Ireland) Sam Magee	(Germany) Peter Käsbauer (Germany) Johanna Goliszewski	21–11, 21–9	(gold) Winner
2011	Banuinvest International	(Republic of Ireland) Sam Magee	(Austria) Roman Zirnwald (Austria) Elisabeth Baldauf	21–12, 18–21, 21–18	(gold) Winner
2011	Lithuanian International	(Republic of Ireland) Sam Magee	(Poland) Wojciech Szkudlarczyk (Poland) Agnieszka Wojtkowska	21–9, 15–21, 21–19	(gold) Winner
2011	Norwegian International	(Republic of Ireland) Sam Magee	(Denmark) Rasmus Bonde (Denmark) Maria Helsbøl	21–17, 21–16	(gold) Winner
2012	Turkey International	(Republic of Ireland) Sam Magee	(Germany) Fabian Roth (Germany) Jennifer Karnott	21–10, 21–14	(gold) Winner
2013	Dutch International	(Republic of Ireland) Sam Magee	(Germany) Michael Fuchs (Germany) Birgit Michels	14–21, 21–18, 17–21	(silver) Runner-up
2014	Hellas International	(Republic of Ireland) Sam Magee	(Bulgaria) Blagovest Kisyov (Bulgaria) Dimitria Popstoikova	21–14, 21–10	(gold) Winner
2015	White Nights	(Republic of Ireland) Sam Magee	(Poland) Robert Mateusiak (Poland) Nadieżda Zięba	21–18, 21–17	(gold) Winner
2017	Spanish International	(Republic of Ireland) Sam Magee	(Netherlands) Robin Tabeling (Netherlands) Cheryl Seinen	21–11, 21–18	(gold) Winner
2017	Irish Open	(Republic of Ireland) Sam Magee	(England) Gregory Mairs (England) Jenny Moore	16–21, 13–21	(silver) Runner-up
2018	Irish Open	(Republic of Ireland) Sam Magee	(England) Harley Towler (England) Emily Westwood	21–13, 21–12	(gold) Winner
2019	White Nights	(Republic of Ireland) Sam Magee	(Russia) Rodion Alimov (Russia) Alina Davletova	16–21, 21–13, 16–21	(silver) Runner-up

BWF International Challenge tournament
BWF International Series tournament
BWF Future Series tournament
