= Raphael Beck (badminton) =

German badminton player

Personal information
- Born: 6 March 1992 (age 34) Düsseldorf, Germany
- Height: 1.88 m (6 ft 2 in)
- Weight: 65 kg (143 lb)

Sport
- Country: Germany
- Sport: Badminton
- Handedness: Right

Men's & mixed doubles
- Highest ranking: 35 (MD 4 June 2015); 72 (XD 3 September 2015)
- Current ranking: 176 (20 August 2019)
- BWF profile
Medal record
Men's badminton
Representing Germany
European Games
Bronze medal – third place	2015 Baku	Men's doubles
Bronze medal – third place	2015 Baku	Mixed doubles
European Mixed Team Championships
Bronze medal – third place	2017 Lubin	Mixed team
European Men's Team Championships
Bronze medal – third place	2016 Kazan	Men's team
European Junior Championships
Gold medal – first place	2011 Vantaa	Mixed team

Raphael Beck (born 6 March 1992) is a German badminton player. He started playing badminton at age 9, and joined the Germany national badminton team in 2011.

== Achievements ==
=== European Games ===
Men's doubles
Year	Venue	Partner	Opponent	Score	Result
2015	Baku Sports Hall; Baku, Azerbaijan	(Germany) Andreas Heinz	(Denmark) Mathias Boe (Denmark) Carsten Mogensen	18–21, 17–21	Bronze

Mixed doubles
Year	Venue	Partner	Opponent	Score	Result
2015	Baku Sports Hall; Baku, Azerbaijan	(Germany) Kira Kattenbeck	(Denmark) Niclas Nøhr (Denmark) Sara Thygesen	21–17, 10–21, 15–21	Bronze

=== BWF Grand Prix ===
The BWF Grand Prix has two levels, the Grand Prix and Grand Prix Gold. It is a series of badminton tournaments sanctioned by the Badminton World Federation (BWF) since 2007.

Men's doubles
Year	Tournament	Partner	Opponent	Score	Result
2017	Thailand Open	(Germany) Peter Käsbauer	(Indonesia) Berry Angriawan (Indonesia) Hardianto	16–21, 16–21	(silver) Runner-up
2014	Scottish Open	(Germany) Andreas Heinz	(Denmark) Mathias Christiansen (Denmark) David Daugaard	13–21, 17–21	(silver) Runner-up
2014	Brasil Open	(Germany) Andreas Heinz	(Germany) Josche Zurwonne (Germany) Max Schwenger	9–11, 6–11, 4–11	(silver) Runner-up

BWF Grand Prix Gold tournament
BWF Grand Prix tournament

=== BWF International Challenge/Series ===
Men's doubles
Year	Tournament	Partner	Opponent	Score	Result
2015	Irish Open	(Germany) Peter Käsbauer	(Poland) Adam Cwalina (Poland) Przemysław Wacha	21–16, 21–18	(gold) Winner
2015	Bulgarian International	(Germany) Peter Käsbauer	(India) Manu Attri (India) B. Sumeeth Reddy	21–14, 21–16	(gold) Winner
2014	White Nights	(Germany) Andreas Heinz	(Poland) Lukasz Moren (Poland) Wojciech Szkudlarczyk	18–21, 17–21	(silver) Runner-up
2014	Mauritius International	(Germany) Andreas Heinz	(Germany) Kai Schaefer (Germany) Tobias Wadenka	18–21, 21–18, 22–20	(gold) Winner

BWF International Challenge tournament
BWF International Series tournament
BWF Future Series tournament
