= Emily Westwood (badminton) =

English badminton player (born 1993)

Personal information
- Born: Hemel Hempstead, England
- Height: 1.54 m (5 ft 1 in)

Sport
- Country: England
- Sport: Badminton
- Handedness: Right
- Coached by: Pete Jeffrey; Julian Robertson

Women's singles & doubles
- Highest ranking: 157 (WS 11 July 2013); 122 (WD 16 October 2014); 44 (XD 9 June 2016)
- BWF profile

Emily Westwood is a badminton player from England.

== Achievements ==
=== BWF International Challenge/Series (2 titles, 3 runners-up) ===
Women's doubles
Year	Tournament	Partner	Opponent	Score	Result
2018	Irish Open	(Malaysia) Yang Li Lian	(England) Jessica Hopton (England) Victoria Williams	21–15, 19–21, 21–19	(gold) Winner

Mixed doubles
Year	Tournament	Partner	Opponent	Score	Result
2015	Welsh International	(England) Matthew Nottingham	(France) Ronan Labar (France) Émilie Lefel	21–13, 25–23	(gold) Winner
2015	Italian International	(England) Matthew Nottingham	(Denmark) Niclas Nøhr (Denmark) Sara Thygesen	10–21, 21–17, 19–21	(silver) Runner-up
2016	Austrian Open	(England) Matthew Nottingham	(Denmark) Mathias Christiansen (Denmark) Lena Grebak	17–21, 17–21	(silver) Runner-up
2018	Irish Open	(England) Harley Towler	(Republic of Ireland) Sam Magee (Republic of Ireland) Chloe Magee	13–21, 12–21	(silver) Runner-up

BWF International Challenge tournament
BWF International Series tournament
BWF Future Series tournament
