= Sam Magee =

Irish badminton player

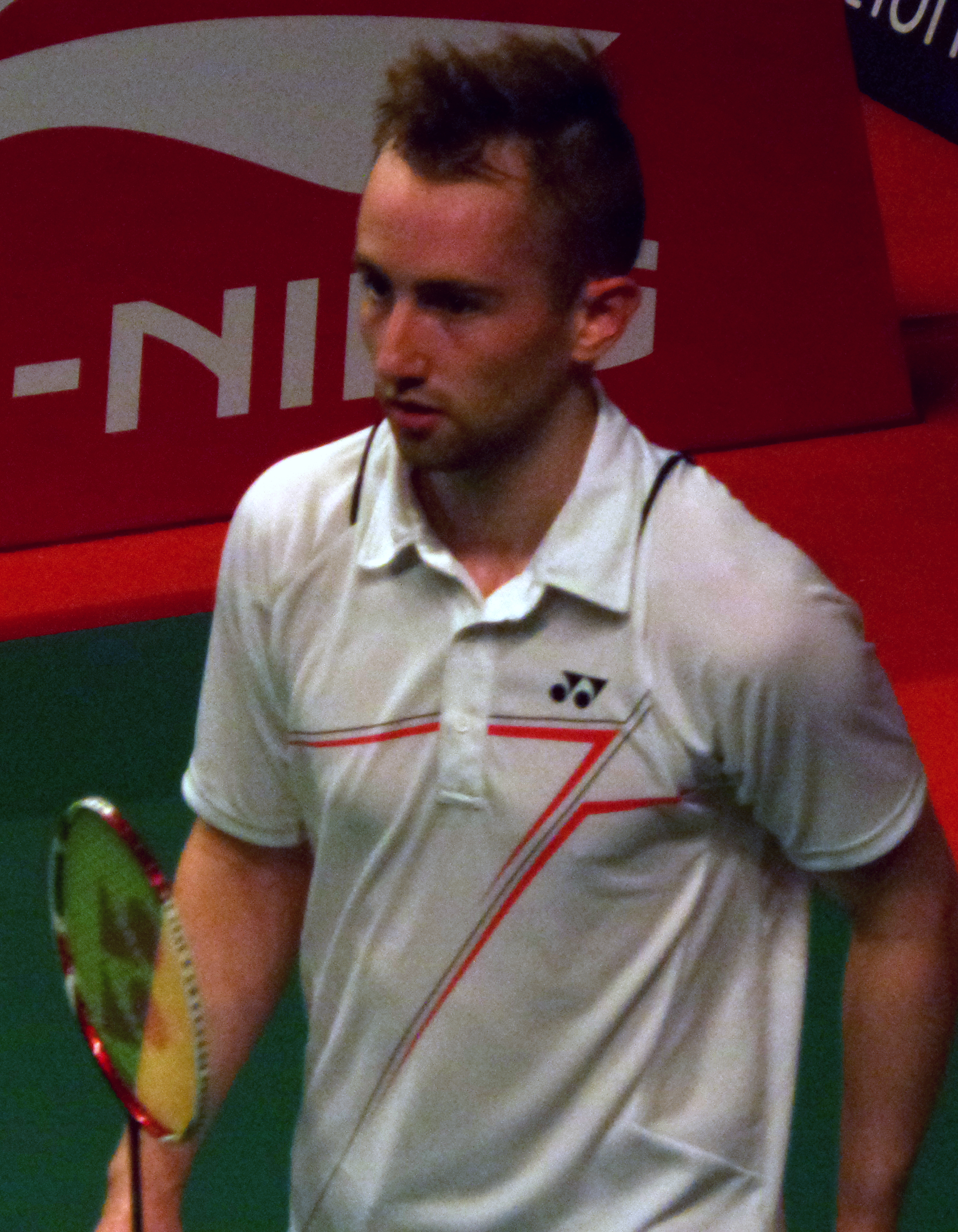

Personal information
- Born: Samuel Magee; 9 January 1990 (age 36) Raphoe, County Donegal, Ireland
- Height: 1.83 m (6 ft 0 in)
- Weight: 70 kg (154 lb)

Sport
- Country: Ireland
- Sport: Badminton
- Handedness: Right
- Coached by: Daniel Magee
- Retired: 16 February 2022

Men's & mixed doubles
- Highest ranking: 41 (MD with Joshua Magee 6 April 2017); 21 (XD with Chloe Magee 6 August 2015)
- BWF profile
Medal record
Men's badminton
Representing Ireland
European Games
Bronze medal – third place	2019 Minsk	Mixed doubles
Bronze medal – third place	2015 Baku	Men's doubles
Bronze medal – third place	2015 Baku	Mixed doubles
European Championships
Bronze medal – third place	2017 Kolding	Mixed doubles
European Junior Championships
Gold medal – first place	2009 Milan	Boys' doubles

Samuel Magee (born 9 January 1990) is a retired Irish badminton player. He won the 2009 European Junior Championships in the boys' doubles event at Milan, Italy with his partner Sylvain Grosjean of France. Sam Magee was a bronze medalists at the European Games in the mixed doubles event with his sister Chloe Magee in 2015 Baku and 2019 Minsk, also in the men's doubles with his brother Joshua Magee in 2015.

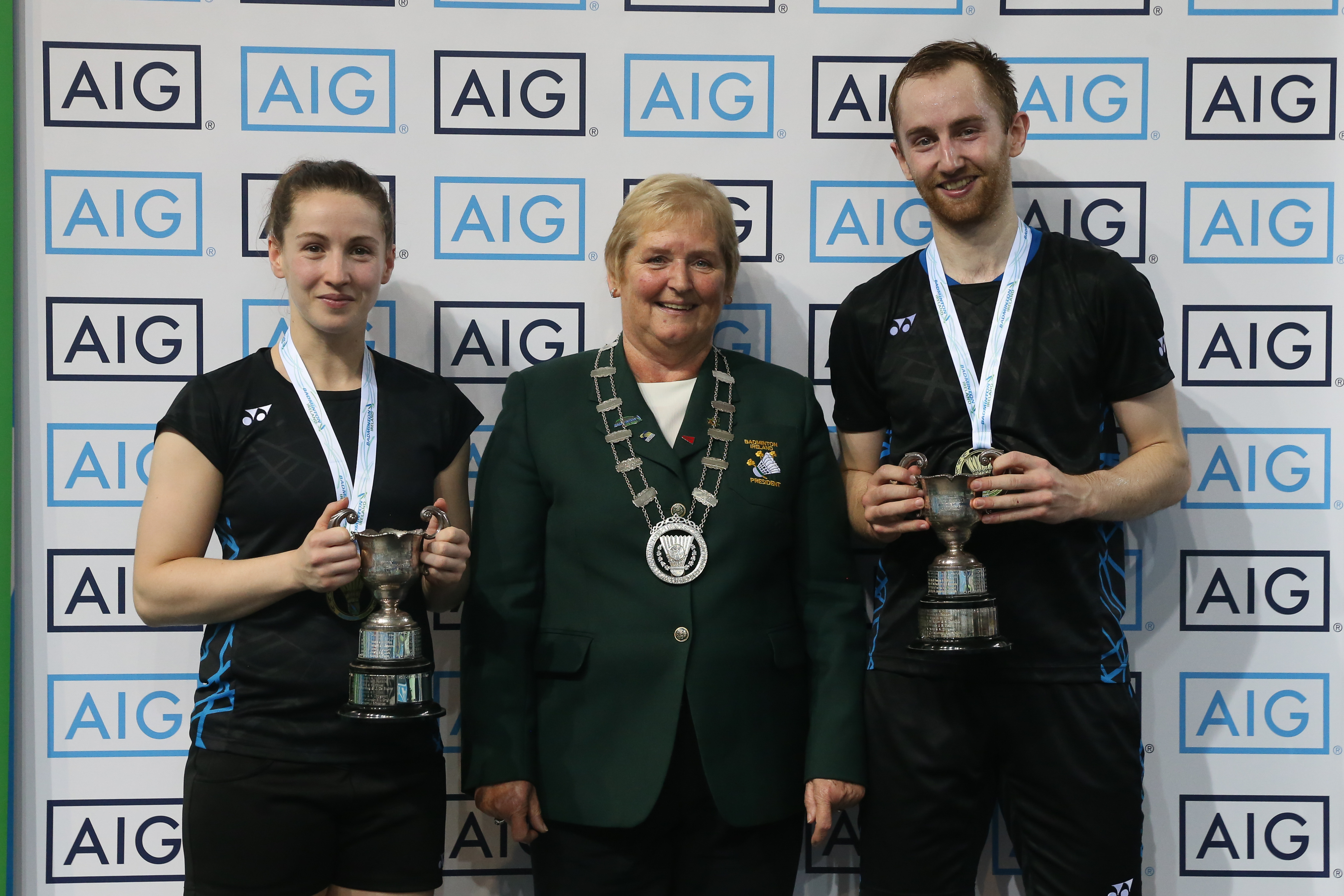
Sam and Chloe Magee won the 2018 Irish Open

== Achievements ==
=== European Games ===
Men's doubles
Year	Venue	Partner	Opponent	Score	Result
2015	Baku Sports Hall; Baku, Azerbaijan	(Republic of Ireland) Joshua Magee	(Russia) Vladimir Ivanov (Russia) Ivan Sozonov	5–21, 9–21	Bronze

Mixed doubles
Year	Venue	Partner	Opponent	Score	Result
2015	Baku Sports Hall; Baku, Azerbaijan	(Republic of Ireland) Chloe Magee	(France) Gaëtan Mittelheisser (France) Audrey Fontaine	12–21, 21–23	Bronze
2019	Falcon Club; Minsk, Belarus	(Republic of Ireland) Chloe Magee	(United Kingdom) Chris Adcock (United Kingdom) Gabby Adcock	8–21, 18–21	Bronze

=== European Championships ===
Mixed doubles
Year	Venue	Partner	Opponent	Score	Result
2017	Sydbank Arena; Kolding, Denmark	(Republic of Ireland) Chloe Magee	(Denmark) Joachim Fischer Nielsen (Denmark) Christinna Pedersen	14–21, 10–21	Bronze

=== European Junior Championships ===
Boys' doubles
Year	Venue	Partner	Opponent	Score	Result
2009	Federal Technical Centre - Palabadminton; Milan, Italy	(France) Sylvain Grosjean	(Denmark) Emil Holst (Denmark) Mads Pedersen	27–25, 14–21, 21–18	Gold

=== BWF Grand Prix ===
The BWF Grand Prix had two levels, the Grand Prix and Grand Prix Gold. It was a series of badminton tournaments sanctioned by the Badminton World Federation (BWF) and played between 2007 and 2017.

Mixed doubles
Year	Tournament	Partner	Opponent	Score	Result
2014	Brasil Open	(Republic of Ireland) Chloe Magee	(Germany) Max Schwenger (Germany) Carla Nelte	11–10, 11–10, 10–11, 8–11, 7–11	(silver) Runner-up

BWF Grand Prix Gold tournament
BWF Grand Prix tournament

=== BWF International Challenge/Series ===
Men's doubles
Year	Tournament	Partner	Opponent	Score	Result
2011	Banuinvest International	(Republic of Ireland) Tony Stephenson	(Ukraine) Mykola Dmitrishin (Ukraine) Vitaly Konov	21–13, 21–14	(gold) Winner
2011	Lithuanian International	(Republic of Ireland) Tony Stephenson	(Poland) Łukasz Moreń (Poland) Wojciech Szkudlarczyk	12–21, 22–24	(silver) Runner-up
2013	Irish International	(Republic of Ireland) Jonathan Dolan	(Slovenia) Kek Jamnik (Slovenia) Alen Roj	21–12, 21–9	(gold) Winner
2016	Slovenia International	(Republic of Ireland) Joshua Magee	(Denmark) Mathias Bay-Smidt (Denmark) Frederik Søgaard	21–9, 20–22, 21–18	(gold) Winner
2017	Irish Open	(Republic of Ireland) Joshua Magee	(Scotland) Alexander Dunn (Scotland) Adam Hall	15–21, 21–6, 10–21	(silver) Runner-up

Mixed doubles
Year	Tournament	Partner	Opponent	Score	Result
2010	Spanish Open	(Republic of Ireland) Chloe Magee	(Germany) Peter Käsbauer (Germany) Johanna Goliszewski	21–11, 21–9	(gold) Winner
2011	Banuinvest International	(Republic of Ireland) Chloe Magee	(Austria) Roman Zirnwald (Austria) Elisabeth Baldauf	21–12, 18–21, 21–18	(gold) Winner
2011	Lithuanian International	(Republic of Ireland) Chloe Magee	(Poland) Wojciech Szkudlarczyk (Poland) Agnieszka Wojtkowska	21–9, 15–21, 21–19	(gold) Winner
2011	Norwegian International	(Republic of Ireland) Chloe Magee	(Denmark) Rasmus Bonde (Denmark) Maria Helsbøl	21–17, 21–16	(gold) Winner
2012	Turkey International	(Republic of Ireland) Chloe Magee	(Germany) Fabian Roth (Germany) Jennifer Karnott	21–10, 21–14	(gold) Winner
2013	Dutch International	(Republic of Ireland) Chloe Magee	(Germany) Michael Fuchs (Germany) Birgit Michels	14–21, 21–18, 17–21	(silver) Runner-up
2014	Hellas International	(Republic of Ireland) Chloe Magee	(Bulgaria) Blagovest Kisyov (Bulgaria) Dimitria Popstoikova	21–14, 21–10	(gold) Winner
2015	White Nights	(Republic of Ireland) Chloe Magee	(Poland) Robert Mateusiak (Poland) Nadieżda Zięba	21–18, 21–17	(gold) Winner
2017	Spanish International	(Republic of Ireland) Chloe Magee	(Netherlands) Robin Tabeling (Netherlands) Cheryl Seinen	21–11, 21–18	(gold) Winner
2017	Irish Open	(Republic of Ireland) Chloe Magee	(England) Gregory Mairs (England) Jenny Moore	16–21, 13–21	(silver) Runner-up
2018	Irish Open	(Republic of Ireland) Chloe Magee	(England) Harley Towler (England) Emily Westwood	21–13, 21–12	(gold) Winner
2019	White Nights	(Republic of Ireland) Chloe Magee	(Russia) Rodion Alimov (Russia) Alina Davletova	16–21, 21–13, 16–21	(silver) Runner-up

BWF International Challenge tournament
BWF International Series tournament
BWF Future Series tournament
