= Harley Towler =

English badminton player (born 1992)

Personal information
- Born: 11 December 1992 (age 33) Lincoln, England
- Height: 1.78 m (5 ft 10 in)

Sport
- Country: England
- Sport: Badminton
- Handedness: Right
- Coached by: Jakob Hoi; Pete Jeffrey

Men's & mixed doubles
- Highest ranking: 41 (MD 3 September 2015)
- BWF profile
Medal record
Men's badminton
Representing England
European Mixed Team Championships
Silver medal – second place	2015 Leuven	Mixed team
European Men's Team Championships
Bronze medal – third place	2016 Kazan	Men's team

Harley Towler (born 11 December 1992) is a badminton player from England. He started playing badminton at age 7. In 2012 and 2013, he became Loughborough Sportsman of the Year. He was educated at the William Farr School and graduated from Loughborough University with a sport & exercise science degree.

== Achievements ==
=== BWF International Challenge/Series ===
Men's doubles
Year	Tournament	Partner	Opponent	Score	Result
2015	Orleans International	(England) Matthew Nottingham	(Poland) Adam Cwalina (Poland) Przemysław Wacha	21–12, 21–18	(gold) Winner
2014	Welsh International	(England) Matthew Nottingham	(Scotland) Adam Hall (Scotland) Gordon Thomson	21–15, 21–13	(gold) Winner
2013	Portugal International	(England) Peter Briggs	(Denmark) Anders Skaarup Rasmussen (Denmark) Kim Astrup	18–21, 14–21	(silver) Runner-up
2012	Welsh International	(England) Peter Briggs	(England) Marcus Ellis (Scotland) Paul van Rietvelde	21–16, 9–21, 16–21	(silver) Runner-up
2012	Czech International	(England) Peter Briggs	(England) Chris Langridge (England) Peter Mills	14–21, 16–21	(silver) Runner-up

Mixed doubles
Year	Tournament	Partner	Opponent	Score	Result
2018	Irish Open	(England) Emily Westwood	(Republic of Ireland) Sam Magee (Republic of Ireland) Chloe Magee	13–21, 12–21	(silver) Runner-up

BWF International Challenge tournament
BWF International Series tournament
BWF Future Series tournament
