= Kira Kattenbeck =

German badminton player (born 1992)

Personal information
- Born: 2 August 1992 (age 34) Steinfurt, Germany
- Height: 1.73 m (5 ft 8 in)

Sport
- Country: Germany
- Sport: Badminton
- Handedness: Right

Women's Doubles & Mixed Doubles
- Highest ranking: 78 (WD) 9 Oct 2014; 65 (XD) 25 Apr 2013
- Current ranking: 327 (WD); 124 (XD) (1 Sep 2016)
- BWF profile
Medal record
Badminton
Representing Germany
European Games
Bronze medal – third place	2015 Baku	Mixed doubles
European Women's Team Championships
Bronze medal – third place	2014 Basel	Women's team
European Junior Championships
Gold medal – first place	2011 Vantaa	Mixed team

Kira Kattenbeck (born 2 August 1992) is a German badminton player. She started playing badminton at aged 8 in Emsdetten, and joined Germany national badminton team in 2011. In 2011, she won gold medal at the European Junior Badminton Championships in mixed team event.

== Achievements ==
=== European Games ===
Mixed Doubles
Year	Venue	Partner	Opponent	Score	Result
2015	Baku, Azerbaijan	(Germany) Raphael Beck	(Denmark) Niclas Nøhr (Denmark) Sara Thygesen	21-17, 10-21, 15-21	Bronze

=== BWF International Challenge/Series ===
Women's Doubles
Year	Tournament	Partner	Opponent	Score	Result
2015	Romanian International	(Germany) Franziska Volkmann	(Germany) Barbara Bellenberg (Germany) Ramona Hacks	15-21, 13-21	(silver) Runner-up

Mixed Doubles
Year	Tournament	Partner	Opponent	Score	Result
2012	Slovenia International	(Germany) Hannes Kaesbauer	(Croatia) Zvonimir Durkinjak (Croatia) Stasa Poznanovic	9-21, 13-21	(silver) Runner-up

BWF International Challenge tournament
BWF International Series tournament
BWF Future Series tournament
