= Andreas Heinz (badminton) =

German badminton player

Personal information
- Born: 5 April 1991 (age 35) Groß-Gerau, Germany
- Height: 1.65 m (5 ft 5 in)

Sport
- Country: Germany
- Sport: Badminton
- Handedness: Right

Men's & mixed doubles
- Highest ranking: 35 (MD) 4 June 2015; 127 (XD) 17 July 2014
- Current ranking: 133 (MD); 237 (XD) (4 May 2017)
- BWF profile
Medal record
Badminton
Representing Germany
European Games
Bronze medal – third place	2015 Baku	Men's doubles
European Men's Team Championships
Bronze medal – third place	2014 Basel	Men's team
European Junior Championships
Bronze medal – third place	2009 Milan	Boys' doubles
Bronze medal – third place	2009 Milan	Mixed team

Andreas Heinz (born 5 April 1991) is a German male badminton player. He started playing badminton at 1999, and joined the Germany national badminton team in 2006.

== Achievements ==
=== European Games ===
Men's Doubles
Year	Venue	Partner	Opponent	Score	Result
2015	Baku Sports Hall; Baku, Azerbaijan	(Germany) Raphael Beck	(Denmark) Mathias Boe (Denmark) Carsten Mogensen	18–21, 17–21	Bronze

=== European Junior Badminton Championships ===
Boys' Doubles
Year	Venue	Partner	Opponent	Score	Result
2009	Federal Technical Centre - Palabadminton; Milan, Italy	(Germany) Jonas Geigenberger	(Denmark) Emil Holst (Denmark) Mads Pedersen	15–21, 22–20, 15–21	Bronze

=== BWF Grand Prix (2 runners-up) ===
The BWF Grand Prix has two level such as Grand Prix and Grand Prix Gold. It is a series of badminton tournaments, sanctioned by Badminton World Federation (BWF) since 2007.

Men's Doubles
Year	Tournament	Partner	Opponent	Score	Result
2014	Scottish Open	(Germany) Raphael Beck	(Denmark) Mathias Christiansen (Denmark) David Daugaard	13–21, 17–21	(silver) Runner-up
2014	Brasil Open	(Germany) Raphael Beck	(Germany) Josche Zurwonne (Germany) Max Schwenger	9–11, 6–11, 4–11	(silver) Runner-up

BWF Grand Prix Gold tournament
BWF Grand Prix tournament

=== BWF International Challenge/Series (2 titles, 7 runners-up) ===
Men's doubles
Year	Tournament	Partner	Opponent	Score	Result
2017	Polish International	(Germany) Daniel Benz	(Republic of Ireland) Nhat Nguyen (Republic of Ireland) Paul Reynolds	19–21, 23–25	(silver) Runner-up
2017	Yonex / K&D Graphics International	(Germany) Daniel Benz	(United States) Vinson Chiu (United States) Tony Gunawan	21–16, 14–21, 14–21	(silver) Runner-up
2017	Hellas International	(Germany) Daniel Benz	(Bulgaria) Daniel Nikolov (Bulgaria) Ivan Rusev	15–21, 21–11, 21–23	(silver) Runner-up
2014	White Nights	(Germany) Raphael Beck	(Poland) Lukasz Moren (Poland) Wojciech Szkudlarczyk	18–21, 17–21	(silver) Runner-up
2014	Mauritius International	(Germany) Raphael Beck	(Germany) Kai Schaefer (Germany) Tobias Wadenka	18–21, 21–18, 22–20	(gold) Winner
2012	Bulgarian International	(Germany) Max Schwenger	(Scotland) Robert Blair (Malaysia) Tan Bin Shen	10–21, 17–21	(silver) Runner-up
2012	Slovenia International	(Germany) Jones Rafli Jansen	(Croatia) Zvonimir Durkinjak (Croatia) Zvonimir Hoelbling	21–17, 17–21, 12–21	(silver) Runner-up
2012	French International	(Germany) Max Schwenger	(Germany) Peter Kaesbauer (Germany) Josche Zurwonne	24–26, 21–17, 11–21	(silver) Runner-up

Mixed doubles
Year	Tournament	Partner	Opponent	Score	Result
2014	Mauritius International	(Germany) Annika Horbach	(South Africa) Andries Malan (South Africa) Jennifer Fry	15–21, 21–18, 21–16	(gold) Winner

Commonwealth Youth Games tournament
BWF International Series tournament
BWF Future Series tournament
