= Łukasz Moreń =

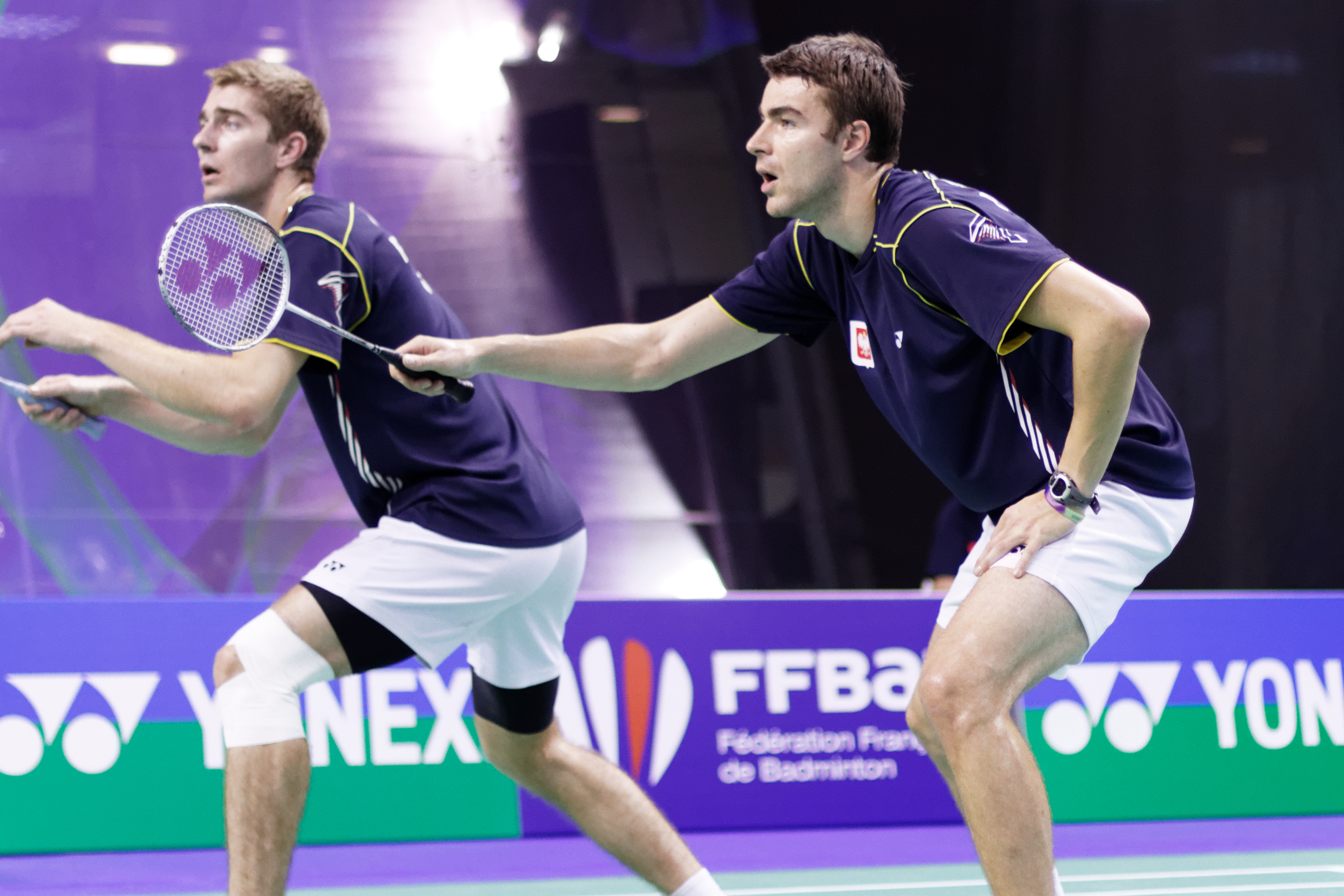
- Łukasz Moreń and Wojciech Szkudlarczyk at the 2013 French Super Series

Personal information
- Born: 1 June 1986 (age 40) Warsaw, Poland
- Height: 1.89 m (6 ft 2 in)
- Weight: 86 kg (190 lb)

Sport
- Country: Poland
- Sport: Badminton
- Coached by: Jolanta Brzeźnicka

Men's & mixed doubles
- Highest ranking: 23 (MD) 21 Nov 2013; 78 (XD) 15 Oct 2009
- BWF profile
Medal record
Badminton
Representing Poland
European Men's Team Championships
Silver medal – second place	2010 Warsaw	Men's team

Łukasz Moreń (born 1 June 1986) is a Polish male badminton player.

== Achievements ==
=== BWF International Challenge/Series ===
Men's doubles
Year	Tournament	Partner	Opponent	Score	Result
2005	Latvia Riga International	(Poland) Wojciech Szkudlarczyk	(Wales) Joe Morgan (Wales) James Phillips	15–11, 15–6	(gold) Winner
2005	Slovak International	(Poland) Wojciech Szkudlarczyk	(Austria) Jürgen Koch (Austria) Peter Zauner	10–15, 3–15	(silver) Runner-up
2008	Banuinvest International	(Poland) Michał Rogalski	(Bulgaria) Vladimir Metodiev (Bulgaria) Krasimir Yankov	17–21, 21–14, 15–21	(silver) Runner-up
2011	Swedish Masters	(Poland) Wojciech Szkudlarczyk	(Denmark) Kim Astrup (Denmark) Rasmus Fladberg	21–14, 23–25, 16–21	(silver) Runner-up
2011	Slovenian International	(Poland) Wojciech Szkudlarczyk	(Austria) Jürgen Koch (Austria) Peter Zauner	21–13, 21–14	(gold) Winner
2011	Lithuanian International	(Poland) Wojciech Szkudlarczyk	(Republic of Ireland) Sam Magee (Republic of Ireland) Tony Stephenson	21–12 24–22	(gold) Winner
2011	Slovak Open	(Poland) Wojciech Szkudlarczyk	(Netherlands) Jorrit de Ruiter (Netherlands) Dave Khodabux	10–21, 20–22	(silver) Runner-up
2011	Swiss International	(Poland) Wojciech Szkudlarczyk	(India) Pranav Chopra (India) Akshay Dewalkar	17–21, 21–16, 21–12	(gold) Winner
2011	Hungarian International	(Poland) Wojciech Szkudlarczyk	(Croatia) Zvonimir Đurkinjak (Croatia) Zvonimir Hölbling	18–21, 18–21	(silver) Runner-up
2012	Polish International	(Poland) Wojciech Szkudlarczyk	(Belgium) Mattijs Dierickx (Belgium) Freek Golinski	21–13, 21–9	(gold) Winner
2013	Dutch International	(Poland) Wojciech Szkudlarczyk	(England) Chris Coles (England) Matthew Nottingham	21–13, 18–21, 21–9	(gold) Winner
2013	Spanish Open	(Poland) Michał Łogosz	(Poland) Adam Cwalina (Poland) Przemysław Wacha	10–21, 21–18, 19–21	(silver) Runner-up
2013	Bulgarian International	(Poland) Wojciech Szkudlarczyk	(Poland) Adam Cwalina (Poland) Przemysław Wacha	21–16, 13–21, 24–22	(gold) Winner
2013	Italian International	(Poland) Wojciech Szkudlarczyk	(Poland) Adam Cwalina (Poland) Przemysław Wacha	21–23, 17–21	(silver) Runner-up
2014	Swedish Masters	(Poland) Wojciech Szkudlarczyk	(Poland) Adam Cwalina (Poland) Przemysław Wacha	18–21, 22–20, 15–21	(silver) Runner-up
2014	Spanish Open	(Poland) Wojciech Szkudlarczyk	(Poland) Adam Cwalina (Poland) Przemysław Wacha	9–21, 21–15, 21–16	(gold) Winner
2014	White Nights	(Poland) Wojciech Szkudlarczyk	(Germany) Raphael Beck (Germany) Andreas Heinz	21–18, 21–17	(gold) Winner
2014	Czech International	(Poland) Wojciech Szkudlarczyk	(Poland) Adam Cwalina (Poland) Przemysław Wacha	15–21, 15–21	(silver) Runner-up
2016	Lithuanian International	(Poland) Wojciech Szkudlarczyk	(Russia) Andrei Ivanov (Russia) Anton Nazarenko	11–21, 21–17, 21–19	(gold) Winner
2016	Slovak Open	(Poland) Wojciech Szkudlarczyk	(Czech Republic) Jakub Bitman (Czech Republic) Pavel Drančák	11–8, 11–8, 11–5	(gold) Winner
2016	Finnish International	(Poland) Wojciech Szkudlarczyk	(Denmark) Jeppe Bay (Denmark) Rasmus Kjær	8–11, 2–11, 4–11	(silver) Runner-up
2017	Polish Open	(Poland) Wojciech Szkudlarczyk	(Scotland) Alexander Dunn (Scotland) Adam Hall	21–11, 21–18	(gold) Winner
2017	Czech International	(Poland) Wojciech Szkudlarczyk	(Germany) Peter Lang (Germany) Thomas Legleitner	23–21, 21–19	(gold) Winner
2017	Lithuanian International	(Poland) Wojciech Szkudlarczyk	(Belgium) Elias Bracke (France) Léo Rossi	19–21, 18–21	(silver) Runner up

Mixed doubles
Year	Tournament	Partner	Opponent	Score	Result
2008	Banuinvest International	(Poland) Małgorzata Kurdelska	(Bulgaria) Stilian Makarski (Bulgaria) Diana Dimova	15–21, 21–10, 18–21	(silver) Runner-up
2009	Portugal International	(Poland) Natalia Pocztowiak	(Russia) Nikita Khakimov (Russia) Liubov Chudentseva	21–13 21–14	(gold) Winner
2011	Hungarian International	(Poland) Natalia Pocztowiak	(Indonesia) Indra Viki Okvana (Indonesia) Gustiani Megawati	11–21, 19–21	(silver) Runner-up

BWF International Challenge tournament
BWF International Series tournament
BWF Future Series tournament
