= Wojciech Szkudlarczyk =

Polish badminton player (born 1986)

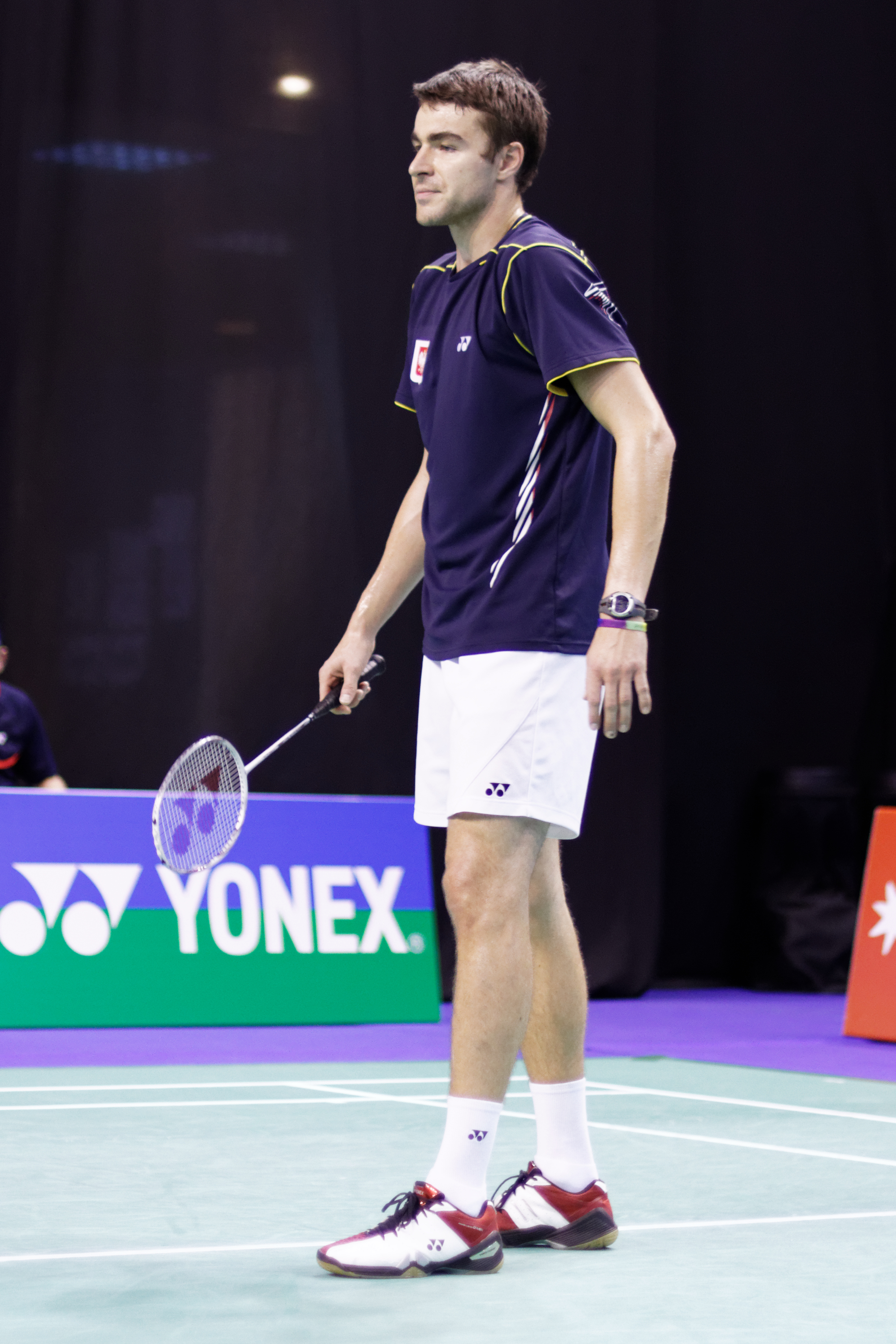

Personal information
- Born: 8 January 1986 (age 40) Poznań, Poland
- Height: 1.86 m (6 ft 1 in)
- Weight: 84 kg (185 lb)

Sport
- Country: Poland
- Sport: Badminton

Men's & mixed doubles
- Highest ranking: 23 (MD 21 November 2013); 37 (XD 3 February 2011)
- BWF profile
Medal record
Men's badminton
Representing Poland
European Mixed Team Championships
| Bronze medal – third place | 2008 Herning | Mixed team |

Wojciech Szkudlarczyk (born 8 January 1986 in Poznań) is a Polish badminton player.

== Career ==
Wojciech Szklarczyk won in 2004 and 2005, three junior titles in Poland. Even as a junior he won also first medals in the adult. By 2011, he was second twice and third six times at the national championships. 2012, 2013 and 2014 he won the national championships. International he won in Wales and Hungary and participated in the badminton world championships in 2006, 2010, 2011, 2012, 2013 and 2014 as well as in the 2010 European Badminton Championships, where he reached rank 5 in the mixed doubles.

== Achievements ==
=== BWF International Challenge/Series ===
Men's doubles
| Year | Tournament | Partner | Opponent | Score | Result |
|---|---|---|---|---|---|
| 2005 | Latvia Riga International | (Poland) Łukasz Moreń | (Wales) Joe Morgan (Wales) James Phillips | 15–11, 15–6 | (gold) Winner |
| 2005 | Slovak International | (Poland) Łukasz Moreń | (Austria) Jürgen Koch (Austria) Peter Zauner | 10–15, 3–15 | (silver) Runner-up |
| 2006 | Lithuanian International | (Poland) Adam Cwalina | (Czech Republic) Pavel Florián (Czech Republic) Stanislav Kohoutek | 26–24, 21–9 | (gold) Winner |
| 2007 | Welsh International | (Poland) Adam Cwalina | (England) Matthew Honey (England) Peter Mills | 21–10, 20–22, 21–15 | (gold) Winner |
| 2008 | Polish International | (Poland) Adam Cwalina | (Poland) Michał Łogosz (Poland) Robert Mateusiak | 16–21, 5–21 | (silver) Runner-up |
| 2008 | Spanish International | (Poland) Adam Cwalina | (Indonesia) Fran Kurniawan (Indonesia) Rendra Wijaya | 11–21, 13–21 | (silver) Runner-up |
| 2008 | Bulgarian International | (Poland) Adam Cwalina | (Russia) Vitalij Durkin (Russia) Aleksandr Nikolaenko | 23–21, 12–21, 20–22 | (silver) Runner-up |
| 2009 | Hungarian International | (Poland) Adam Cwalina | (Russia) Vladimir Ivanov (Russia) Ivan Sozonov | 21–17, 13–21, 28–26 | (gold) Winner |
| 2011 | Swedish Masters | (Poland) Łukasz Moreń | (Denmark) Kim Astrup (Denmark) Rasmus Fladberg | 21–14, 23–25, 16–21 | (silver) Runner-up |
| 2011 | Slovenian International | (Poland) Łukasz Moreń | (Austria) Jürgen Koch (Austria) Peter Zauner | 21–13, 21–14 | (gold) Winner |
| 2011 | Lithuanian International | (Poland) Łukasz Moreń | (Republic of Ireland) Sam Magee (Republic of Ireland) Tony Stephenson | 21–12 24–22 | (gold) Winner |
| 2011 | Slovak Open | (Poland) Łukasz Moreń | (Netherlands) Jorrit de Ruiter (Netherlands) Dave Khodabux | 10–21, 20–22 | (silver) Runner-up |
| 2011 | Swiss International | (Poland) Łukasz Moreń | (India) Pranav Chopra (India) Akshay Dewalkar | 17–21, 21–16, 21–12 | (gold) Winner |
| 2011 | Hungarian International | (Poland) Łukasz Moreń | (Croatia) Zvonimir Đurkinjak (Croatia) Zvonimir Hölbling | 18–21, 18–21 | (silver) Runner-up |
| 2012 | Polish International | (Poland) Łukasz Moreń | (Belgium) Mattijs Dierickx (Belgium) Freek Golinski | 21–13, 21–9 | (gold) Winner |
| 2013 | Dutch International | (Poland) Łukasz Moreń | (England) Christopher Coles (England) Matthew Nottingham | 21–13, 18–21, 21–9 | (gold) Winner |
| 2013 | Bulgarian International | (Poland) Łukasz Moreń | (Poland) Adam Cwalina (Poland) Przemysław Wacha | 21–16, 13–21, 24–22 | (gold) Winner |
| 2013 | Italian International | (Poland) Łukasz Moreń | (Poland) Adam Cwalina (Poland) Przemysław Wacha | 21–23, 17–21 | (silver) Runner-up |
| 2014 | Swedish Masters | (Poland) Łukasz Moreń | (Poland) Adam Cwalina (Poland) Przemysław Wacha | 18–21, 22–20, 15–21 | (silver) Runner-up |
| 2014 | Spanish Open | (Poland) Łukasz Moreń | (Poland) Adam Cwalina (Poland) Przemysław Wacha | 9–21, 21–15, 21–16 | (gold) Winner |
| 2014 | White Nights | (Poland) Łukasz Moreń | (Germany) Raphael Beck (Germany) Andreas Heinz | 21–18, 21–17 | (gold) Winner |
| 2014 | Czech International | (Poland) Łukasz Moreń | (Poland) Adam Cwalina (Poland) Przemysław Wacha | 15–21, 15–21 | (silver) Runner-up |
| 2015 | Polish International | (Poland) Paweł Pietryja | (Denmark) Kasper Antonsen (Denmark) Niclas Nøhr | 21–17, 8–21, 12–21 | (silver) Runner-up |
| 2016 | Lithuanian International | (Poland) Łukasz Moreń | (Russia) Andrei Ivanov (Russia) Anton Nazarenko | 11–21, 21–17, 21–19 | (gold) Winner |
| 2016 | Slovak Open | (Poland) Łukasz Moreń | (Czech Republic) Jakub Bitman (Czech Republic) Pavel Drančák | 11–8, 11–8, 11–5 | (gold) Winner |
| 2016 | Finnish International | (Poland) Łukasz Moreń | (Denmark) Jeppe Bay (Denmark) Rasmus Kjær | 8–11, 2–11, 4–11 | (silver) Runner-up |
| 2017 | Polish Open | (Poland) Łukasz Moreń | (Scotland) Alexander Dunn (Scotland) Adam Hall | 21–11, 21–18 | (gold) Winner |
| 2017 | Czech International | (Poland) Łukasz Moreń | (Germany) Peter Lang (Germany) Thomas Legleitner | 23–21, 21–19 | (gold) Winner |
| 2017 | Lithuanian International | (Poland) Łukasz Moreń | (Belgium) Elias Bracke (France) Léo Rossi | 19–21, 18–21 | (silver) Runner up |

Mixed doubles
| Year | Tournament | Partner | Opponent | Score | Result |
|---|---|---|---|---|---|
| 2009 | Hungarian International | (Poland) Agnieszka Wojtkowska | (Germany) Peter Käsbauer (Germany) Johanna Goliszewski | 21–15, 8–21, 21–10 | (gold) Winner |
| 2010 | Bahrain International | (Poland) Agnieszka Wojtkowska | (Indonesia) Indra Viki Okvana (Indonesia) Gustiani Megawati | 21–17, 16–21, 14–21 | (silver) Runner-up |
| 2011 | Slovenia International | (Poland) Agnieszka Wojtkowska | (Croatia) Zvonimir Đurkinjak (Croatia) Staša Poznanović | 15–21, 11–21 | (silver) Runner-up |
| 2011 | Lithuanian International | (Poland) Agnieszka Wojtkowska | (Republic of Ireland) Sam Magee (Republic of Ireland) Chloe Magee | 9–21, 21–15, 19–21 | (silver) Runner-up |
| 2011 | Slovak Open | (Poland) Agnieszka Wojtkowska | (Netherlands) Dave Khodabux (Netherlands) Selena Piek | 13–21, 18–21 | (silver) Runner-up |
| 2011 | Scottish International | (Poland) Agnieszka Wojtkowska | (Denmark) Kim Astrup (Denmark) Line Kjærsfeldt | 21–15, 15–21, 13–21 | (silver) Runner-up |
| 2012 | White Nights | (Poland) Agnieszka Wojtkowska | (France) Baptiste Carême (France) Audrey Fontaine | 17–21, 10–21 | (silver) Runner-up |
| 2012 | Polish International | (Poland) Agnieszka Wojtkowska | (England) Andrew Ellis (England) Jenny Wallwork | 13–21, 12–21 | (silver) Runner-up |
| 2013 | Polish Open | (Poland) Agnieszka Wojtkowska | (Poland) Robert Mateusiak (Poland) Nadieżda Zięba | 21–15, 16–21, 14–21 | (silver) Runner-up |
| 2013 | Spanish Open | (Poland) Agnieszka Wojtkowska | (Denmark) Anders Skaarup Rasmussen (Denmark) Lena Grebak | 14–21, 18–21 | (silver) Runner-up |

BWF International Challenge tournament
BWF International Series tournament
BWF Future Series tournament
