= Jennifer Karnott =

German badminton player (born 1995)

Personal information
- Born: 4 March 1995 (age 31) Birkesdorf, Düren, Germany
- Height: 1.65 m (5 ft 5 in)

Sport
- Country: Germany
- Sport: Badminton
- Handedness: Right

Women's Doubles & Mixed Doubles
- Highest ranking: 64 (WD) 3 Sep 2015; 123 (XD) 1 Sep 2016
- Current ranking: 142 (WD); 123 (XD) (1 Sep 2016)
- BWF profile
Medal record
Badminton
Representing Germany
European Junior Championships
Gold medal – first place	2011 Vantaa	Mixed team
Bronze medal – third place	2013 Ankara	Mixed team

Jennifer Karnott (born 4 March 1995) is a German badminton player.

== Achievements ==
=== BWF International Challenge/Series ===
Women's Doubles
Year	Tournament	Partner	Opponent	Score	Result
2015	Portugal International	(Germany) Carola Bott	(Japan) Ayane Kurihara (Japan) Naru Shinoya	13-21, 16-21	(silver) Runner-up

Mixed Doubles
Year	Tournament	Partner	Opponent	Score	Result
2012	Turkey International	(Germany) Fabian Roth	(Republic of Ireland) Sam Magee (Republic of Ireland) Chloe Magee	10-21, 14-21	(silver) Runner-up

Commonwealth Youth Games tournament
BWF International Series tournament
BWF Future Series tournament
