= Freek Golinski =

Belgian badminton player (born 1991)

Personal information
- Born: 19 June 1991 (age 35) Leuven, Belgium
- Height: 1.89 m (6 ft 2 in)
- Weight: 78 kg (172 lb)

Sport
- Country: Belgium
- Sport: Badminton
- Handedness: Right
- Coached by: Alan McIlvain; Wouter Claes

Men's & mixed doubles
- Highest ranking: 41 (MD 2 April 2015); 77 (XD 21 April 2011)
- BWF profile

Freek Golinski (born 19 June 1991) is a Belgian badminton player. He competed in the 2015 European Games. Golinski has collected 12 Belgian National Championships title, 10 in the men's doubles, and 2 in the mixed doubles. He has won some international tournament, including the 2014 Peru International, 2015 Mercosul International, 2016 Jamaica International, and 2017 Slovenian International.

== Achievements ==
=== BWF International Challenge/Series ===
Men's doubles
| Year | Tournament | Partner | Opponent | Score | Result | Ref. |
|---|---|---|---|---|---|---|
| 2012 | Polish International | (Belgium) Matijs Dierickx | (Poland) Łukasz Moreń (Poland) Wojciech Szkudlarczyk | 13–21, 9–21 | (silver) Runner-up | |
| 2014 | Iceland International | (Belgium) Matijs Dierickx | (Scotland) Martin Campbell (Scotland) Patrick MacHugh | 15–21, 21–12, 14–21 | (silver) Runner-up | |
| 2014 | Peru International | (Belgium) Matijs Dierickx | (United States) Christian Yahya Christianto (United States) Hock Lai Lee | 17–21, 21–19, 21–13 | (gold) Winner | |
| 2015 | Mercosul International | (Belgium) Matijs Dierickx | (United States) Phillip Chew (United States) Sattawat Pongnairat | 21–13, 8–21, 21–19 | (gold) Winner | |
| 2016 | Jamaica International | (Belgium) Matijs Dierickx | (India) Alwin Francis (India) Tarun Kona | 21–19, Retired | (gold) Winner | |
| 2017 | Slovenian International | (Belgium) Matijs Dierickx | (Denmark) Jeppe Bay (Denmark) Rasmus Kjær | 21–13, 21–16 | (gold) Winner | |

BWF International Challenge tournament
BWF International Series tournament
BWF Future Series tournament
