= Matijs Dierickx =

Belgian badminton player (born 1991)

Mattijs Dierickx
Personal information
- Born: 18 November 1991 (age 34) Dendermonde, Belgium
- Height: 1.73 m (5 ft 8 in)
- Weight: 70 kg (154 lb)

Sport
- Country: Belgium
- Sport: Badminton
- Handedness: Right
- Coached by: Alan McIlvain; Wouter Claes

Men's
- Highest ranking: 34 (MD) 2 Apr 2015; 99 (XD) 6 Dec 2012
- BWF profile

Mattijs Dierickx (born 18 November 1991) is a Belgian male badminton player.

== Achievements ==
=== BWF International Challenge/Series ===
Men's Doubles
Year	Tournament	Partner	Opponent	Score	Result
2017	Slovenia International	(Belgium) Freek Golinski	(Denmark) Jeppe Bay (Denmark) Rasmus Kjær	21–13, 21–16	(gold) Winner
2016	Jamaica International	(Belgium) Freek Golinski	(India) Alwin Francis (India) Tarun Kona	21–19, Retired	(silver) Runner-up
2015	Mercosul International	(Belgium) Freek Golinski	(United States) Phillip Chew (United States) Sattawat Pongnairat	21–13, 8–21, 21–19	(gold) Winner
2014	Peru International	(Belgium) Freek Golinski	(United States) Christian Yahya Christianto (United States) Hock Lai Lee	17–21, 21–19, 21–13	(gold) Winner
2014	Iceland International	(Belgium) Freek Golinski	(Scotland) Martin Campbell (Scotland) Patrick MacHugh	15–21, 21–12, 14–21	(silver) Runner-up
2012	Polish International	(Belgium) Freek Golinski	(Poland) Lukasz Moren (Poland) Wojciech Szkudlarczyk	13–21, 9–21	(silver) Runner-up

BWF International Challenge tournament
BWF International Series tournament
BWF Future Series tournament
