= Joshua Magee =

Irish badminton player (born 1994)

Personal information
- Born: 3 November 1994 (age 32) Donegal, Ireland
- Height: 1.83 m (6 ft 0 in)
- Weight: 72 kg (159 lb)

Sport
- Country: Ireland
- Sport: Badminton
- Handedness: Right

Men's singles & doubles
- Highest ranking: 133 (MS 19 March 2019); 41 (MD with Sam Magee 6 April 2017); 159 (XD with Rachael Darragh 1 September 2016)
- Current ranking: 57 (MD with Paul Reynolds 7 February 2023)
- BWF profile
Medal record
Men's badminton
Representing Ireland
European Games
Bronze medal – third place	2015 Baku	Men's doubles

Joshua Magee (born 3 November 1994) is an Irish badminton player. He started playing badminton at the age of six in Raphoe club, and was selected to join the national team in 2014. He competed at the 2015 and 2019 European Games, and in 2015, he won a bronze medal in the men's doubles event with his brother Sam Magee.

In addition to Sam, he also has two siblings Chloe and Daniel, both who played at international level.

== Achievements ==
=== European Games ===
Men's doubles
Year	Venue	Partner	Opponent	Score	Result
2015	Baku Sports Hall; Baku, Azerbaijan	(Republic of Ireland) Sam Magee	(Russia) Vladimir Ivanov (Russia) Ivan Sozonov	5–21, 9–21	Bronze

=== BWF International Challenge/Series (2 titles, 4 runners-up) ===
Men's doubles
Year	Tournament	Partner	Opponent	Score	Result
2016	Slovenia International	(Republic of Ireland) Sam Magee	(Denmark) Mathias Bay-Smidt (Denmark) Frederik Søgaard	21–9, 20–22, 21–18	(gold) Winner
2017	Irish Open	(Republic of Ireland) Sam Magee	(Scotland) Alexander Dunn (Scotland) Adam Hall	15–21, 21–6, 10–21	(silver) Runner-up
2019	Czech Open	(Republic of Ireland) Paul Reynolds	(Norway) Torjus Flåtten (Norway) Vegard Rikheim	21–16, 21–18	(gold) Winner

Mixed doubles
Year	Tournament	Partner	Opponent	Score	Result
2024	Latvia International	(Republic of Ireland) Moya Ryan	(Estonia) Kristjan Kaljurand (Estonia) Helina Rüütel	21–19, 16–21, 15–21	(silver) Runner-up
2024	Polish International	(Republic of Ireland) Moya Ryan	(Denmark) Kristoffer Kolding (Denmark) Mette Werge	15–21, 18–21	(silver) Runner-up
2024	Welsh International	(Republic of Ireland) Moya Ryan	(Spain) Rubén García (Spain) Lucía Rodríguez	13–21, 11–21	(silver) Runner-up

BWF International Challenge tournament
BWF International Series tournament
BWF Future Series tournament
