= Baku Sports Palace =

Indoor sports arena in Baku, Azerbaijan

- Bakı İdman Sarayı
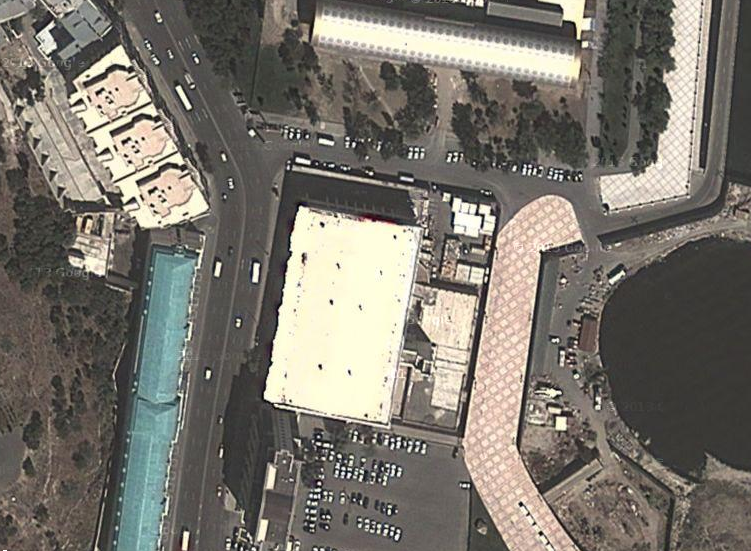
- Interactive map of Baku Sports Palace
- Former names: Palace of Hand Games (Azerbaijani: Əl Oyunları Sarayı)
- Location: Baku, Azerbaijan
- Coordinates: 40.3586°N 49.835°E
- Capacity: 1,736
- Public transit: Icheri Sheher (Baku Metro), Baku Funicular.

Construction
- Opened: 1974
- Renovated: 2015

Baku Sports Palace (also known as Baku Sport Hall) is an indoor arena located in Baku, Azerbaijan. Originally, the arena was named Palace of Hand Games (Azerbaijani: Əl Oyunları Sarayı) until 2015. It is located near the Baku Boulevard on the Caspian Sea coast. It was built in 1974 and renovated in 2015. The arena consists of 1736 seats.

Various domestic and international competitions such as badminton, judo, futsal, wrestling, table tennis, taekwondo and volleyball are held in the Palace.

== Events hosted ==
Competitions	Date	Year	Type of sport
2004 Summer Olympic Games European Qualification Tournament	21–22 February	2004	Taekwondo
Golden Grand Prix International Tournament	17–19 July	2009	Wrestling
2015 European Games	12–22 June	2015	Badminton and table tennis
Golden Grand Prix International Tournament	27–29 November	2015	Wrestling
2017 Islamic Solidarity Games	12–22 May	2017	Handball and table tennis

== See also ==
- Baku Olympic Stadium
- National Gymnastics Arena
