= 2007 European Junior Badminton Championships – Mixed team =

- Venue: Hermann-Neuberger-Halle
- Location: Völklingen, Germany
- Dates: 31 March 2007 – 3 April 2007
- Competitors: 197 from 16 nations

Medalists
gold medal	England
silver medal	Netherlands
bronze medal	Denmark

The mixed team tournament of the 2007 European Junior Badminton Championships was held from 31 March to 3 April 2007.

== Seeds ==
1. Denmark
2. Russia
3. Germany
4. Netherlands
5. England
6. Sweden
7. Bulgaria
8. France
1. Scotland
2. Portugal
3. Ukraine
4. Poland
5. Estonia
6. Czech Republic
7. Switzerland
8. Turkey

== Group stage ==
=== Group A ===
Pos	Team	Pld	W	L	MF	MA	MD	GF	GA	GD	PF	PA	PD	Pts
1	Denmark	3	3	0	15	0	+15	30	4	+26	707	529	+178	3
2	Scotland	3	2	1	9	6	+3	20	17	+3	681	665	+16	2
3	France	3	1	2	3	12	−9	10	24	−14	566	645	−79	1
4	Turkey	3	0	3	3	12	−9	9	24	−15	534	649	−115	0

Source: TS
- Denmark vs. Turkey

Denmark
5
Hermann-Neuberger-Halle, Court 2
31 March 2007, 09:00 UTC+1

Turkey
0

			1	2	3
1	(Denmark) (Turkey)	Karina Jorgensen; Öznur Çalışkan	21; 18	21; 15
2	(Denmark) (Turkey)	Mads Conrad-Petersen; Hasan Hüseyin Durakcan	21; 14	21; 11
3	(Denmark) (Turkey)	Maria Thorberg / Maja Bech; Ezgi Epice / Öznur Çalışkan	21; 15	21; 18
4	(Denmark) (Turkey)	Christian John Skovgaard / Christian Larsen; Göksel Kundakçı / Numan Özkan	21; 17	20; 22	21; 10
5	(Denmark) (Turkey)	Mads Pieler Kolding / Line Damkjær Kruse; Hasan Hüseyin Durakcan / Ezgi Epice	21; 11	21; 16

- France vs. Scotland

France
0
Hermann-Neuberger-Halle, Court 1
31 March 2007, 09:00 UTC+1

Scotland
5

			1	2	3
1	(France) (Scotland)	Laurent Constantin / Émilie Lefel; Thomas Bethell / Jillie Cooper	15; 21	21; 18	11; 21
2	(France) (Scotland)	Maxime Michel; Kieran Merrilees	21; 18	18; 21	21; 21
3	(France) (Scotland)	Sarah Sicard; Linda Sloan	12; 21	16; 21
4	(France) (Scotland)	Sylvain Grosjean / Elias Bourahla; Paul van Rietvelde / Thomas Bethell	12; 21	21; 16	16; 21
5	(France) (Scotland)	Émilie Lefel / Sandrine Callon; Linda Sloan / Jillie Cooper	15; 21	13; 21

- Denmark vs. Scotland

Denmark
5
Hermann-Neuberger-Halle, Court 2
31 March 2007, 09:00 UTC+1

Scotland
0

			1	2	3
1	(Denmark) (Scotland)	Mads Pieler Kolding / Line Damkjær Kruse; Thomas Bethell / Jillie Cooper	19; 21	21; 15	21; 9
2	(Denmark) (Scotland)	Martin Kragh; Kieran Merrilees	19; 21	21; 16	21; 16
3	(Denmark) (Scotland)	Anne Hald Jensen; Linda Sloan	21; 18	21; 15
4	(Denmark) (Scotland)	Mads Conrad-Petersen / Mads Pieler Kolding; Duncan Leith / Peter Hockey	21; 13	21; 15
5	(Denmark) (Scotland)	Line Damkjær Kruse / Joan Christiansen; Linda Sloan / Jillie Cooper	21; 15	21; 19

- France vs. Turkey

France
3
Hermann-Neuberger-Halle, Court 1
31 March 2007, 09:00 UTC+1

Turkey
2

			1	2	3
1	(France) (Turkey)	Maxime Michel; Hasan Hüseyin Durakcan	17; 21	15; 21
2	(France) (Turkey)	Marie Maunoury; Ezgi Epice	18; 21	17; 21
3	(France) (Turkey)	Sylvain Grosjean / Elias Bourahla; Göksel Kundakçı / Numan Özkan	21; 12	21; 15
4	(France) (Turkey)	Émilie Lefel / Sandrine Callon; Nurdan Ekin / Öznur Calışkan	21; 11	21; 8
5	(France) (Turkey)	Sylvain Grosjean / Émilie Lefel; Hasan Hüseyin Durakcan / Ezgi Epice	21; 5	21; 19

- Denmark vs. France

Denmark
5
Hermann-Neuberger-Halle, Court 1
31 March 2007, 09:00 UTC+1

France
0

			1	2	3
1	(Denmark) (France)	Mikkel Elbjørn / Maja Bech; Sylvain Grosjean / Sandrine Callon	19; 21	21; 14	21; 17
2	(Denmark) (France)	Martin Kragh; Maime Renault	21; 18	21; 15
3	(Denmark) (France)	Anne Hald Jensen; Sarah Sicard	21; 14	21; 12
4	(Denmark) (France)	Christian Larsen / Christian John Skovgaard; Elias Bourahla / Sylvain Grosjean	21; 18	21; 15
5	(Denmark) (France)	Joan Christiansen / Maria Thorberg; Émilie Lefel / Sandrine Callon	21; 12	21; 13

- Scotland vs. Turkey

Scotland
4
Hermann-Neuberger-Halle, Court 2
31 March 2007, 09:00 UTC+1

Turkey
1

			1	2	3
1	(Scotland) (Turkey)	Kieran Merrilees; Hasan Hüseyin Durakcan	21; 18	21; 17
2	(Scotland) (Turkey)	Linda Sloan; Ezgi Epice	14; 21	21; 17	21; 12
3	(Scotland) (Turkey)	Paul van Rietvelde / Thomas Bethell; Numan Özkan / Göksel Kundakçı	21; 15	21; 16
4	(Scotland) (Turkey)	Catriona Lawlor / Gillian Sloan; Özur Calışkan / Rabia Kemer	21; 16	10; 21	21; 18
5	(Scotland) (Turkey)	Peter Hockey / Alison Marr; Hasan Hüseyin Durakcan / Ezgi Epice	18; 21	16; 21

=== Group B ===
Pos	Team	Pld	W	L	MF	MA	MD	GF	GA	GD	PF	PA	PD	Pts
1	Russia	3	3	0	11	4	+7	25	12	+13	748	627	+121	3
2	Czech Republic	3	2	1	9	6	+3	20	15	+5	642	606	+36	2
3	Bulgaria	3	1	2	8	7	+1	20	17	+3	681	676	+5	1
4	Switzerland	3	0	3	2	13	−11	7	28	−21	542	704	−162	0

Source: TS
- Russia vs. Switzerland

Russia
5
Hermann-Neuberger-Halle, Court 4
31 March 2007, 09:00 UTC+1

Switzerland
0

			1	2	3
1	(Russia) (Switzerland)	Gordey Kosenko / Victoria Ushkova; Anthony Dumartheray / Tenzin Pelling	21; 18	21; 11
2	(Russia) (Switzerland)	Ivan Sozonov; Marc Schneidereit	21; 10	21; 11
3	(Russia) (Switzerland)	Ksenia Polikarpova; Justine Ling	19; 21	21; 15	21; 15
4	(Russia) (Switzerland)	Ivan Sozonov / Nikita Khakimov; Anthony Dumartheray / Shane Razi	21; 17	25; 23
5	(Russia) (Switzerland)	Victoria Slobodyanyuk / Victoria Ushkova; Tenzin Pelling / Justine Ling	21; 23	21; 13	21; 18

- Bulgaria vs. Czech Republic

Bulgaria
2
Hermann-Neuberger-Halle, Court 3
31 March 2007, 09:00 UTC+1

Czech Republic
3

			1	2	3
1	(Bulgaria) (Czech Republic)	Peyo Boichinov; Jakub Bitman	25; 23	17; 21	15; 21
2	(Bulgaria) (Czech Republic)	Gabriela Banova; Kristína Ludíková	21; 18	11; 21	15; 21
3	(Bulgaria) (Czech Republic)	Peyo Boichinov / Tihomir Hadziev; Pavel Drančák / Ondřej Kopřiva	21; 13	21; 14
4	(Bulgaria) (Czech Republic)	Dimitria Popstoikova / Gabriela Banova; Dominika Koukalová / Šárka Křížková	21; 16	21; 17
5	(Bulgaria) (Czech Republic)	Tihomir Hadziev / Dimitria Popstoikova; Jakub Bitman / Kristína Ludíková	17; 21	9; 21

- Russia vs. Czech Republic

Russia
3
Hermann-Neuberger-Halle, Court 4
31 March 2007, 17:00 UTC+1

Czech Republic
2

			1	2	3
1	(Russia) (Czech Republic)	Ivan Sozonov; Jakub Bitman	21; 16	21; 13
2	(Russia) (Czech Republic)	Victoria Slobodyanyuk; Kristína Ludíková	21; 23	13; 21
3	(Russia) (Czech Republic)	Lubov Chudentcevc / Ksenia Polikarpova; Dominika Koukalová / Šárka Křížková	19; 21	25; 23	21; 14
4	(Russia) (Czech Republic)	Ivan Sozonov / Nikita Khakimov; Pavel Drančák / Ondřej Kopřiva	21; 13	21; 5
5	(Russia) (Czech Republic)	Gordey Kosenko / Victoria Ushkova; Jakub Bitman / Kristína Ludíková	13; 21	21; 12	12; 21

- Bulgaria vs. Switzerland

Bulgaria
4
Hermann-Neuberger-Halle, Court 3
31 March 2007, 17:00 UTC+1

Switzerland
1

			1	2	3
1	(Bulgaria) (Switzerland)	Dimitria Popstoikova; Tenzin Pelling	15; 21	21; 19	18; 21
2	(Bulgaria) (Switzerland)	Tihomir Hadziev / Peyo Boichinov; Shane Razi / Anthony Dumartheray	15; 21	21; 13	21; 13
3	(Bulgaria) (Switzerland)	Dimitria Popstoikova / Gabriela Banova; Justine Ling / Ennia Biedermann	21; 4	21; 18
4	(Bulgaria) (Switzerland)	Tihomir Hadziev; Shane Razi	21; 11	21; 17
5	(Bulgaria) (Switzerland)	Peyo Boichinov / Gabriela Banova; Anthony Dumartheray / Tenzin Pelling	22; 20	21; 11

- Russia vs. Bulgaria

Russia
3
Hermann-Neuberger-Halle, Court 3
1 April 2007, 13:00 UTC+1

Bulgaria
2

			1	2	3
1	(Russia) (Bulgaria)	Ksenia Polikarpova; Dimitria Popstoikova	21; 18	19; 21	19; 21
2	(Russia) (Bulgaria)	Gordey Kosenko / Lubov Chudentcevc; Peyo Boichinov / Gabriela Banova	21; 13	21; 23	17; 21
3	(Russia) (Bulgaria)	Ivan Sozonov; Borislav Andreev	21; 12	21; 11
4	(Russia) (Bulgaria)	Victoria Slobodyanyuk / Victoria Ushkova; Dimitria Popstoikova / Gabriela Banova	16; 21	21; 18	21; 19
5	(Russia) (Bulgaria)	Ivan Sozonov / Nikita Khakimov; Tihomir Hadziev / Peyo Boichinov	21; 17	21; 14

- Czech Republic vs. Switzerland

Czech Republic
4
Hermann-Neuberger-Halle, Court 4
1 April 2007, 13:00 UTC+1

Switzerland
1

			1	2	3
1	(Czech Republic) (Switzerland)	Jakub Bitman; Anthony Dumartheray	21; 11	23; 21
2	(Czech Republic) (Switzerland)	Kristína Ludíková; Tenzin Pelling	21; 15	21; 9
3	(Czech Republic) (Switzerland)	Ondřej Kopřiva / Pavel Drančák; Marc Schneidereit / Shane Razi	21; 13	21; 10
4	(Czech Republic) (Switzerland)	Šárka Křížková / Dominika Koukalová; Justine Ling / Tenzin Pelling	21; 21	12; 12	21; 21
5	(Czech Republic) (Switzerland)	Jakub Bitman / Kristína Ludíková; Thomas Heiniger / Ennia Biedermann	21; 10	21; 15

=== Group C ===
Pos	Team	Pld	W	L	MF	MA	MD	GF	GA	GD	PF	PA	PD	Pts
1	England	3	3	0	12	3	+9	25	7	+18	637	455	+182	3
2	Germany (H)	3	2	1	9	6	+3	19	18	+1	690	676	+14	2
3	Ukraine	3	1	2	8	7	+1	19	14	+5	592	584	+8	1
4	Estonia	3	0	3	1	14	−13	5	29	−24	503	707	−204	0

Source: TS
(H) Host
- Germany vs. Estonia

Germany
4
Hermann-Neuberger-Halle, Court 2
31 March 2007, 13:00 UTC+1

Estonia
1

			1	2	3
1	(Germany) (Estonia)	Fabian Hammes; Rainer Kaljumäe	18; 21	21; 15	21; 18
2	(Germany) (Estonia)	Lisa Deichgräber; Karoliine Hõim	18; 18	23; 23	19; 19
3	(Germany) (Estonia)	Peter Käsbauer / Lukas Schmidt; Raul Käsner / Ingmar Seidelberg	21; 8	21; 15
4	(Germany) (Estonia)	Dana Kaufhold / Mascha Bahro; Laura Vana / Karoliine Hõim	21; 17	21; 18
5	(Germany) (Estonia)	Peter Käsbauer / Julia Schmidt; Rainer Kaljumäe / Ketly Freirik	21; 23	21; 18	21; 10

- England vs. Ukraine

England
3
Hermann-Neuberger-Halle, Court 1
31 March 2007, 13:00 UTC+1

Ukraine
2

			1	2	3
1	(England) (Ukraine)	Chris Adcock / Gabrielle White; Artur Burlaka / Olga Chkheidze	21; 6	21; 13
2	(England) (Ukraine)	Jamie Bonsels; Dmytro Zavadsky	14; 21	14; 21
3	(England) (Ukraine)	Michelle Cheung; Mariya Martynenko	21; 14	21; 9
4	(England) (Ukraine)	Mariana Agathangelou / Gabrielle White; Olena Mashchenko / Olga Chkheidze	16; 21	19; 21
5	(England) (Ukraine)	Chris Adcock / Peter Mills; Georgiy Natarov / Dmytro Zavadsky	21; 9	21; 15

- Germany vs. Ukraine

Germany
4
Hermann-Neuberger-Halle, Court 1
1 April 2007, 09:00 UTC+1

Ukraine
1

			1	2	3
1	(Germany) (Ukraine)	Lukas Schmidt; Dmytro Zavadsky	21; 15	10; 21	21; 17
2	(Germany) (Ukraine)	Mona Reich; Mariya Martynenko	19; 21	21; 23
3	(Germany) (Ukraine)	Peter Käsbauer / Lukas Schmidt; Artur Burlaka / Denys Panchenko	21; 8	17; 21	21; 10
4	(Germany) (Ukraine)	Dana Kaufhold / Mascha Bahro; Olena Mashchenko / Olga Chkheidze	21; 16	22; 20
5	(Germany) (Ukraine)	Peter Käsbauer / Julia Schmidt; Dmytro Zavadsky / Mariya Martynenko	21; 18	19; 21	22; 20

- England vs. Estonia

England
5
Hermann-Neuberger-Halle, Court 2
1 April 2007, 09:00 UTC+1

Estonia
0

			1	2	3
1	(England) (Estonia)	Jamie Bonsels; Rainer Kaljumäe	21; 18	19; 21	21; 9
2	(England) (Estonia)	Michelle Cheung; Karoliine Hõim	21; 9	21; 15
3	(England) (Estonia)	Chris Adcock / Peter Mills; Raul Käsner / Ingmar Seidelberg	21; 13	21; 4
4	(England) (Estonia)	Mariana Agathangelou / Gabrielle White; Laura Vana / Karoliine Hõim	21; 8	21; 14
5	(England) (Estonia)	Marcus Ellis / Samantha Ward; Rainer Kaljumäe / Ketly Freirik	21; 12	21; 15

- Germany vs. England

Germany
1
Hermann-Neuberger-Halle, Court 1
1 April 2007, 17:00 UTC+1

England
4

			1	2	3
1	(Germany) (England)	Peter Käsbauer / Julia Schmidt; Chris Adcock / Gabrielle White	18; 21	9; 21
2	(Germany) (England)	Sebastian Rduch; Jamie Bonsels	17; 21	21; 12	21; 18
3	(Germany) (England)	Mona Reich; Michelle Cheung	12; 21	14; 21
4	(Germany) (England)	Peter Käsbauer / Lukas Schmidt; Chris Adcock / Peter Mills	15; 21	17; 21
5	(Germany) (England)	Dana Kaufhold / Mascha Bahro; Mariana Agathangelou / Gabrielle White	14; 21	9; 21

- Ukraine vs. Estonia

Ukraine
5
Hermann-Neuberger-Halle, Court 2
1 April 2007, 17:00 UTC+1

Estonia
0

			1	2	3
1	(Ukraine) (Estonia)	Artur Burlaka / Olga Chkheidze; Rainer Kaljumäe / Ketly Freirik	21; 14	21; 13
2	(Ukraine) (Estonia)	Mariya Martynenko; Laura Vana	21; 15	21; 14
3	(Ukraine) (Estonia)	Georgiy Natarov / Artur Burlaka; Raul Käsner / Ingmar Seidelberg	22; 20	21; 19
4	(Ukraine) (Estonia)	Dmytro Zavadsky; Rainer Kaljumäe	21; 15	21; 17
5	(Ukraine) (Estonia)	Olena Mashchenko / Olga Chkheidze; Laura Vana / Ketly Freirik	21; 6	21; 6

=== Group D ===
Pos	Team	Pld	W	L	MF	MA	MD	GF	GA	GD	PF	PA	PD	Pts
1	Netherlands	3	3	0	12	3	+9	24	11	+13	698	540	+158	3
2	Poland	3	2	1	8	7	+1	17	16	+1	574	588	−14	2
3	Sweden	3	1	2	8	7	+1	20	16	+4	648	622	+26	1
4	Portugal	3	0	3	2	13	−11	8	26	−18	528	698	−170	0

Source: TS
- Netherlands vs. Poland

Netherlands
4
Hermann-Neuberger-Halle, Court 4
31 March 2007, 13:00 UTC+1

Poland
1

			1	2	3
1	(Netherlands) (Poland)	Lester Oey / Samantha Barning; Maciej Kowalik / Marlena Flis	21; 5	21; 10
2	(Netherlands) (Poland)	Stephan Branderhorst; Łukasz Barszczewski	19; 21	21; 12	21; 15
3	(Netherlands) (Poland)	Yik-Man Wong; Anna Narel	21; 12	21; 15
4	(Netherlands) (Poland)	Samantha Barning / Eefje Muskens; Marlena Flis / Natalia Pocztowiak	21; 17	21; 17
5	(Netherlands) (Poland)	Jelle Maas / Jacco Arends; Kamil Raszkiewicz / Pawel Drozdz	18; 21	19; 21

- Sweden vs. Portugal

Sweden
5
Hermann-Neuberger-Halle, Court 3
31 March 2007, 13:00 UTC+1

Portugal
0

			1	2	3
1	(Sweden) (Portugal)	Gabriel Ulldahl; Pedro Martins	22; 20	21; 11
2	(Sweden) (Portugal)	Jessica Karlsson; Cláudia Figueira	21; 12	21; 18
3	(Sweden) (Portugal)	Joel Johansson-Berg / Gabriel Ulldahl; Pedro Soares / Miguel Jardim	21; 10	21; 11
4	(Sweden) (Portugal)	Sanne Ekberg / Amanda Högström; Helena Pestana / Dalila Belém	18; 21	22; 20	21; 17
5	(Sweden) (Portugal)	Henrik Fahlström / Sanne Ekberg; Pedro Martins / Dalila Belém	18; 21	21; 8	22; 20

- Netherlands vs. Portugal

Netherlands
4
Hermann-Neuberger-Halle, Court 3
1 April 2007, 09:00 UTC+1

Portugal
1

			1	2	3
1	(Netherlands) (Portugal)	Lester Oey / Samantha Barning; Pedro Soares / Dalila Belém	21; 11	21; 11
2	(Netherlands) (Portugal)	Quintus Thies; Miguel Jardim	16; 21	19; 21
3	(Netherlands) (Portugal)	Yik-Man Wong; Helena Pestana	21; 18	19; 21	21; 9
4	(Netherlands) (Portugal)	Jelle Maas / Jacco Arends; Miguel Jardim / Pedro Martins	19; 21	21; 15	21; 19
5	(Netherlands) (Portugal)	Eefje Muskens / Samantha Barning; Dalila Belém / Helena Pestana	21; 12	21; 13

- Sweden vs. Poland

Sweden
2
Hermann-Neuberger-Halle, Court 4
1 April 2007, 09:00 UTC+1

Poland
3

			1	2	3
1	(Sweden) (Poland)	Henrik Fahlström / Louise Hedberg; Maciej Kowalik / Marlena Flis	21; 14	21; 16
2	(Sweden) (Poland)	Gabriel Ulldahl; Łukasz Barszczewski	21; 6	21; 5
3	(Sweden) (Poland)	Jessica Karlsson; Anna Narel	21; 17	13; 21	14; 21
4	(Sweden) (Poland)	Gabriel Ulldahl / Joel Johansson-Berg; Maciej Kowalik / Pawel Drozdz	19; 21	13; 21
5	(Sweden) (Poland)	Jessica Karlsson / Amanda Högström; Marlena Flis / Natalia Pocztowiak	21; 16	14; 21	18; 21

- Netherlands vs. Sweden

Netherlands
4
Hermann-Neuberger-Halle, Court 3
1 April 2007, 17:00 UTC+1

Sweden
1

			1	2	3
1	(Netherlands) (Sweden)	Yik-Man Wong; Jessica Karlsson	21; 8	21; 16
2	(Netherlands) (Sweden)	Lester Oey; Gabriel Ulldahl	21; 17	19; 21	21; 12
3	(Netherlands) (Sweden)	Samantha Barning / Patty Stolzenbach; Jessica Karlsson / Louise Hedberg	21; 7	21; 7
4	(Netherlands) (Sweden)	Jacco Arends / Jelle Maas; Johan Kasperi / Peder Nordin	21; 14	15; 21	21; 17
5	(Netherlands) (Sweden)	Jordy Hilbink / Iris Tabeling; Henrik Fahlström / Louise Hedberg	13; 21	18; 21

- Portugal vs. Poland

Portugal
1
Hermann-Neuberger-Halle, Court 4
1 April 2007, 17:00 UTC+1

Poland
4

			1	2	3
1	(Portugal) (Poland)	Pedro Martins / Dalila Belém; Pawel Drozdz / Natalia Pocztowiak	21; 19	21; 19
2	(Portugal) (Poland)	Miguel Jardim; Maciej Kowalik	10; 21	19; 21
3	(Portugal) (Poland)	Helena Pestana; Anna Narel	20; 22	10; 21
4	(Portugal) (Poland)	Pedro Soares / Pedro Martins; Maciej Kowalik / Pawel Drozdz	20; 22	9; 21
5	(Portugal) (Poland)	Helena Pestana / Dalila Belém; Marlena Flis / Natalia Pocztowiak	10; 21	7; 21

== Knockout stage ==
=== Top 4 ===
Semi-finals
A1	Denmark	1
C1	England	3
D1	Netherlands	3
B1	Russia	1

Gold medal match
C1	England	3
D1	Netherlands	1
Bronze medal match
A1	Denmark	3
B1	Russia	0

- Denmark vs. England

Denmark
1
Hermann-Neuberger-Halle, Court 1
2 April 2007, 13:00 UTC+1

England
3

			1	2	3
1	(Denmark) (England)	Christian Larsen / Joan Christiansen; Chris Adcock / Gabrielle White	18; 21	20; 22
2	(Denmark) (England)	Mads Conrad-Petersen; Jamie Bonsels	21; 12	21; 18
3	(Denmark) (England)	Karina Jørgensen; Michelle Cheung	20; 22	10; 21
4	(Denmark) (England)	Christian Larsen / Christian John Skovgaard; Chris Adcock / Peter Mills	22; 24	18; 21
5	(Denmark) (England)	Line Damkjær Kruse / Joan Christiansen; Gabrielle White / Mariana Agathangelou				not played

- Netherlands vs. Russia

Netherlands
3
Hermann-Neuberger-Halle, Court 3
2 April 2007, 13:00 UTC+1

Russia
1

			1	2	3
1	(Netherlands) (Russia)	Lester Oey / Samantha Barning; Nikita Khakimov / Victoria Ushkova	21; 10	21; 19
2	(Netherlands) (Russia)	Patty Stolzenbach; Ksenia Polikarpova	21; 16	21; 14
3	(Netherlands) (Russia)	Lester Oey; Ivan Sozonov	24; 22	22; 24	14; 21
4	(Netherlands) (Russia)	Patty Stolzenbach / Samantha Barning; Victoria Slobodyanyuk / Victoria Ushkova	21; 7	21; 17
5	(Netherlands) (Russia)	Jelle Maas / Jacco Arends; Ivan Sozonov / Nikita Khakimov				not played

- Denmark vs. Russia

Denmark
3
Hermann-Neuberger-Halle, Court 1
3 April 2007, 13:00 UTC+1

Russia
0

			1	2	3
1	(Denmark) (Russia)	Mads Pieler Kolding / Line Damkjær Kruse; Gordey Kosenko / Lubov Chudentcevc	21; 14	21; 10
2	(Denmark) (Russia)	Martin Kragh; Nikita Khakimov	17; 21	21; 19	21; 17
3	(Denmark) (Russia)	Anne Hald Jensen; Anastasiya Panushkina	21; 16	21; 11
4	(Denmark) (Russia)	Mads Pieler Kolding / Mads Conrad-Petersen; Nikita Khakimov / Ivan Sozonov				not played
5	(Denmark) (Russia)	Joan Christiansen / Line Damkjær Kruse; Anastasiya Panushkina / Lubov Chudentcevc				not played

- England vs. Netherlands

England
3
Hermann-Neuberger-Halle, Court 1
3 April 2007, 15:00 UTC+1

Netherlands
1

			1	2	3
1	(England) (Netherlands)	Chris Adcock / Gabrielle White; Lester Oey / Samantha Barning	21; 9	21; 13
2	(England) (Netherlands)	Michelle Cheung; Patty Stolzenbach	21; 7	21; 18
3	(England) (Netherlands)	Jamie Bonsels; Lester Oey	16; 21	20; 22
4	(England) (Netherlands)	Gabrielle White / Mariana Agathangelou; Patty Stolzenbach / Samantha Barning	21; 16	21; 15
5	(England) (Netherlands)	Chris Adcock / Peter Mills; Jelle Maas / Jacco Arends				not played

=== 5th – 8th place ===
5th – 8th place match
C2	Germany	3
B2	Czech Republic	1
A2	Scotland	3
D2	Poland	0

5th place match
C2	Germany	3
A2	Scotland	0
7th place match
B2	Czech Republic	3
D2	Poland	2

- Germany vs. Czech Republic

Germany
3
Hermann-Neuberger-Halle, Court 2
2 April 2007, 13:00 UTC+1

Czech Republic
1

			1	2	3
1	(Germany) (Czech Republic)	Fabian Hammes; Jakub Bitman	21; 17	21; 12
2	(Germany) (Czech Republic)	Mona Reich; Kristína Ludíková	11; 21	7; 21
3	(Germany) (Czech Republic)	Lukas Schmidt / Philip Welker; Pavel Drančák / Ondřej Kopřiva	21; 17	21; 14
4	(Germany) (Czech Republic)	Dana Kaufhold / Mascha Bahro; Šárka Křížková / Dominika Koukalová	21; 16	21; 17
5	(Germany) (Czech Republic)	Peter Käsbauer / Peter Käsbauer; Jakub Bitman / Kristína Ludíková				not played

- Scotland vs. Poland

Scotland
3
Hermann-Neuberger-Halle, Court 4
2 April 2007, 13:00 UTC+1

Poland
0

			1	2	3
1	(Scotland) (Poland)	Kieran Merrilees; Łukasz Barszczewski	21; 11	21; 12
2	(Scotland) (Poland)	Linda Sloan; Anna Narel	21; 18	21; 15
3	(Scotland) (Poland)	Thomas Bethell / Jillie Cooper; Maciej Kowalik / Marlena Flis	21; 18	21; 16
4	(Scotland) (Poland)	Thomas Bethell / Paul van Rietvelde; Maciej Kowalik / Pawel Drozdz				not played
5	(Scotland) (Poland)	Linda Sloan / Jillie Cooper; Marlena Flis / Natalia Pocztowiak				not played

- Germany vs. Scotland

Germany
3
Hermann-Neuberger-Halle, Court 2
3 April 2007, 13:00 UTC+1

Scotland
0

			1	2	3
1	(Germany) (Scotland)	Julia Schmidt / Peter Käsbauer; Paul van Rietvelde / Gillian Sloan	21; 15	19; 21	21; 8
2	(Germany) (Scotland)	Fabian Hammes; Stephen McPhail	18; 21	21; 15	21; 11
3	(Germany) (Scotland)	Lisa Deichgräber; Catriona Lawlor	21; 14	21; 10
4	(Germany) (Scotland)	Dana Kaufhold / Mascha Bahro; Alisson Marr / Gillian Sloan				not played
5	(Germany) (Scotland)	Josche Zurwonne / Peter Käsbauer; Peter Hockey / Duncan Leith				not played

- Czech Republic vs. Poland

Czech Republic
3
Hermann-Neuberger-Halle, Court 3
2 April 2007, 13:00 UTC+1

Poland
2

			1	2	3
1	(Czech Republic) (Poland)	Kristína Ludíková; Anna Narel	21; 18	19; 21	21; 15
2	(Czech Republic) (Poland)	Jakub Bitman; Maciej Kowalik	25; 27	17; 21
3	(Czech Republic) (Poland)	Šárka Křížková / Dominika Koukalová; Marlena Flis / Natalia Pocztowiak	11; 21	6; 21
4	(Czech Republic) (Poland)	Pavel Drančák / Ondřej Kopřiva; Pawel Drozdz / Kamil Raszkiewicz	25; 23	21; 17
5	(Czech Republic) (Poland)	Jakub Bitman / Kristína Ludíková; Maciej Kowalik / Marlena Flis	23; 21	13; 21	21; 12

=== 9th – 12th place ===
9th – 12th place match
C3	Ukraine	3
D3	Sweden	1
A3	France	3
B3	Bulgaria	1

9th place match
C3	Ukraine	3
A3	France	0
11th place match
D3	Sweden	3
B3	Bulgaria	1

- Ukraine vs. Sweden

Ukraine
3
Hermann-Neuberger-Halle, Court 3
2 April 2007, 09:00 UTC+1

Sweden
1

			1	2	3
1	(Ukraine) (Sweden)	Dmytro Zavadsky / Mariya Martynenko; Henrik Fahlström / Louise Hedberg	21; 18	21; 12
2	(Ukraine) (Sweden)	Artur Burlaka; Gabriel Ulldahl	17; 21	18; 21
3	(Ukraine) (Sweden)	Olena Mashchenko / Olga Chkheidze; Louise Hedberg / Sanne Ekberg	21; 13	17; 21	21; 17
4	(Ukraine) (Sweden)	Mariya Martynenko; Jessica Karlsson	21; 19	21; 14
5	(Ukraine) (Sweden)	Dmytro Zavadsky / Georgiy Natarov; Peder Nordin / Johan Kasperi				not played

- France vs. Bulgaria

France
3
Hermann-Neuberger-Halle, Court 4
2 April 2007, 09:00 UTC+1

Bulgaria
1

			1	2	3
1	(France) (Bulgaria)	Maxime Michel; Peyo Boichinov	11; 21	21; 7	21; 16
2	(France) (Bulgaria)	Émilie Lefel / Sandrine Callon; Dimitria Popstoikova / Gabriela Banova	21; 21	13; 13	21; 21
3	(France) (Bulgaria)	Elias Bourahla / Sylvain Grosjean; Tihomir Hadziev / Ilian Krastev	21; 10	21; 19
4	(France) (Bulgaria)	Marie Maunoury; Dimitria Popstoikova	21; 10	23; 21
5	(France) (Bulgaria)	Sylvain Grosjean / Émilie Lefel; Peyo Boichinov / Gabriela Banova				not played

- Ukraine vs. France

Ukraine
3
Hermann-Neuberger-Halle, Court 1
2 April 2007, 17:00 UTC+1

France
0

			1	2	3
1	(Ukraine) (France)	Dmytro Zavadsky; Maxime Michel	21; 18	21; 11
2	(Ukraine) (France)	Olga Chkheidze / Olena Mashchenko; Sandrine Callon / Émilie Lefel	19; 21	21; 9	21; 15
3	(Ukraine) (France)	Dmytro Zavadsky / Georgiy Natarov; Elias Bourahla / Sylvain Grosjean	21; 9	27; 25
4	(Ukraine) (France)	Mariya Martynenko; Marie Maunoury				not played
5	(Ukraine) (France)	Artur Burlaka / Olga Chkheidze; Sylvain Grosjean / Émilie Lefel				not played

- Sweden vs. Bulgaria

Sweden
3
Hermann-Neuberger-Halle, Court 2
2 April 2007, 17:00 UTC+1

Bulgaria
1

			1	2	3
1	(Sweden) (Bulgaria)	Jonatan Nordh / Louise Hedberg; Borislav Andreev / Bistra Maneva	10; 21	18; 21
2	(Sweden) (Bulgaria)	Petter Yngvesson; Peyo Boichinov	13; 21	21; 16	21; 16
3	(Sweden) (Bulgaria)	Jessica Karlsson; Parashkeva Neykova	21; 9	21; 19
4	(Sweden) (Bulgaria)	Peder Nordin / Johan Kasperi; Tihomir Hadziev / Ilian Krastev	21; 13	21; 16
5	(Sweden) (Bulgaria)	Louise Hedberg / Sanne Ekberg; Rumiana Ivanova / Gabriela Banova				not played

=== 13th – 16th place ===
13th – 16th place match
B4	Switzerland	3
C4	Estonia	1
A4	Turkey	3
D4	Portugal	2

13th place match
B4	Switzerland	3
A4	Turkey	1
15th place match
C4	Estonia	3
D4	Portugal	1

- Switzerland vs. Estonia

Switzerland
3
Hermann-Neuberger-Halle, Court 1
2 April 2007, 09:00 UTC+1

Estonia
1

			1	2	3
1	(Switzerland) (Estonia)	Tenzin Pelling; Karoliine Hõim	21; 17	21; 19
2	(Switzerland) (Estonia)	Marc Schneidereit; Rainer Kaljumäe	11; 21	11; 21
3	(Switzerland) (Estonia)	Tenzin Pelling / Justine Ling; Laura Vana / Karoliine Hõim	21; 18	21; 18
4	(Switzerland) (Estonia)	Anthony Dumartheray / Shane Razi; Raul Käsner / Ingmar Seidelberg	21; 15	21; 13
5	(Switzerland) (Estonia)	Thomas Heiniger / Ennia Biedermann; Ketly Freirik / Rainer Kaljumäe				not played

- Turkey vs. Portugal

Turkey
3
Hermann-Neuberger-Halle, Court 2
2 April 2007, 09:00 UTC+1

Portugal
2

			1	2	3
1	(Turkey) (Portugal)	Hasan Hüseyin Durakcan; Miguel Jardim	21; 16	21; 19
2	(Turkey) (Portugal)	Ezgi Epice; Helena Pestana	17; 21	21; 14	19; 21
3	(Turkey) (Portugal)	Numan Özkan / Burak Köse; Pedro Martins / Pedro Soares	15; 21	21; 19	12; 21
4	(Turkey) (Portugal)	Öznur Çalışkan / Rabia Kemer; Dalila Belém / Helena Pestana	21; 11	26; 24
5	(Turkey) (Portugal)	Hasan Hüseyin Durakcan / Ezgi Epice; Pedro Martins / Dalila Belém	15; 21	21; 19	21; 14

- Switzerland vs. Turkey

Switzerland
3
Hermann-Neuberger-Halle, Court 3
2 April 2007, 17:00 UTC+1

Turkey
1

			1	2	3
1	(Switzerland) (Turkey)	Anthony Dumartheray; Hasan Hüseyin Durakcan	15; 21	18; 21
2	(Switzerland) (Turkey)	Tenzin Pelling; Ezgi Epice	21; 19	21; 10
3	(Switzerland) (Turkey)	Shane Razi / Anthony Dumartheray; Numan Özkan / Burak Köse	21; 15	21; 15
4	(Switzerland) (Turkey)	Tenzin Pelling / Justine Ling; Öznur Çalışkan / Rabia Kemer	21; 8	21; 16
5	(Switzerland) (Turkey)	Thomas Heiniger / Ennia Biedermann; Hasan Hüseyin Durakcan / Ezgi Epice				not played

- Estonia vs. Portugal

Estonia
3
Hermann-Neuberger-Halle, Court 4
2 April 2007, 17:00 UTC+1

Portugal
1

			1	2	3
1	(Estonia) (Portugal)	Rainer Kaljumäe / Ketly Freirik; Pedro Soares / Cláudia Figueira	21; 17	21; 14
2	(Estonia) (Portugal)	Karoliine Hõim; Helena Pestana	13; 21	21; 19	21; 17
3	(Estonia) (Portugal)	Rainer Kaljumäe; Pedro Martins	10; 21	15; 21
4	(Estonia) (Portugal)	Laura Vana / Karoliine Hõim; Dalila Belém / Cláudia Figueira	21; 17	22; 20
5	(Estonia) (Portugal)	Ingmar Seidelberg / Raul Käsner; Pedro Martins / Pedro Soares				not played

== Ranking ==
Rank	Team	W	L	MF	MA	MD	GF	GA	GD	PF	PA	PD	Players
1st place, gold medalist(s)	England	5	0	18	5	+13	37	11	+26	960	726	+234	Chris Adcock, Jamie Bonsels, Marcus Ellis, Peter Mills, , Bruce PeakeChris Hotchen, Robert Kettle, Victor Liew
1st place, gold medalist(s)	England	5	0	18	5	+13	37	11	+26	960	726	+234	Gabrielle White, Mariana Agathangelou, Michelle Cheung, Samantha Ward, Kate Robertshaw, Laura Cousins, Sarah Walker
2nd place, silver medalist(s)	Netherlands	4	1	16	7	+9	33	19	+14	1005	852	+153	Jacco Arends, Jelle Maas, Jordy Hilbink, Lester Oey, Quintus Thies, Stephan Branderhorst
2nd place, silver medalist(s)	Netherlands	4	1	16	7	+9	33	19	+14	1005	852	+153	Eefje Muskens, Iris Tabeling, Patty Stolzenbach, Samantha Barning, Yik-Man Wong, Selena Piek
3rd place, bronze medalist(s)	Denmark	4	1	19	3	+16	38	11	+27	1000	798	+202	Christian John Skovgaard, Christian Larsen, Mads Conrad-Petersen, Mads Pieler Kolding, Martin Kragh, Mikkel Elbjørn, Dennis Prehn
3rd place, bronze medalist(s)	Denmark	4	1	19	3	+16	38	11	+27	1000	798	+202	Anne Hald Jensen, Joan Christiansen, Karina Jørgensen, Line Damkjær Kruse, Maja Bech, Maria Thorberg, Camilla Overgaard
4	Russia	3	2	12	10	+2	28	25	+3	1006	956	+50	Gordey Kosenko, Ivan Sozonov, Nikita Khakimov
4	Russia	3	2	12	10	+2	28	25	+3	1006	956	+50	Anastasiya Panushkina, Ksenia Polikarpova, Lubov Chudentcevc, Victoria Slobodyanyuk, Victoria Ushkova
5	Germany	4	1	15	7	+8	31	22	+9	997	926	+71	Fabian Hammes, Josche Zurwonne, Lukas Schmidt, Peter Käsbauer, Philip Welker, Sebastian Rduch, Adrian Gevelhoff, Andreas Heinz, Johannes Szilagyi, Mathieu Pohl
5	Germany	4	1	15	7	+8	31	22	+9	997	926	+71	Dana Kaufhold, Julia Schmidt, Lisa Deichgräber, Mascha Bahro, Mona Reich, Carla Nelte, Fabienne Deprez, Franziska Burkert, Lisa Heidenreich, Neele Voigt
6	Scotland	3	2	12	9	+3	28	23	+5	922	918	+4	Duncan Leith, Kieran Merrilees, Paul van Rietvelde, Peter Hockey, Stephen McPhail, Thomas Bethell
6	Scotland	3	2	12	9	+3	28	23	+5	922	918	+4	Alisson Marr, Catriona Lawlor, Gillian Sloan, Jillie Cooper, Linda Sloan
7	Czech Republic	3	2	13	11	+2	28	27	+1	1000	988	+12	Jakub Bitman, Ondřej Kopřiva, Pavel Drančák, Jakub Vitvera, Mikuláš Skála
7	Czech Republic	3	2	13	11	+2	28	27	+1	1000	988	+12	Dominika Koukalová, Kristína Ludíková, Šárka Křížková, Eliška Maixnerová, Martina Vacková
8	Poland	2	3	10	13	-3	23	28	-5	902	937	-35	Kamil Raszkiewicz, Łukasz Barszczewski, Maciej Kowalik, Pawel Drozdz, Adrian Dziółko, Adrian Wasilewski, Damain Broj, Rafał Skrzek
8	Poland	2	3	10	13	-3	23	28	-5	902	937	-35	Anna Narel, Marlena Flis, Natalia Pocztowiak, Aneta Wojtkowska, Ewelina Sadłowska, Katarzyna Nideraus, Klaudia Rogalska, Mariola Grządzielska
9	Ukraine	3	2	14	8	+6	31	18	+13	921	848	+73	Artur Burlaka, Denys Panchenko, Dmytro Zavadsky, Georgiy Natarov
9	Ukraine	3	2	14	8	+6	31	18	+13	921	848	+73	Mariya Martynenko, Olena Mashchenko, Olga Chkheidze, Viktoriya Pogrebniak
10	France	2	3	6	16	-10	18	33	-15	869	952	-83	Elias Bourahla, Laurent Constantin, Maxime Michel, Maxime Renault, Sylvain Grosjean, Alexandre Françoise, Arnaud Génin, Thomas Rouxel
10	France	2	3	6	16	-10	18	33	-15	869	952	-83	Émilie Lefel, Marie Maunoury, Sandrine Callon, Sarah Sicard, Charlotte Coudrais, Flora Sabigno, Pauline Privat
11	Sweden	2	3	12	11	+1	29	25	+4	971	952	+19	Gabriel Ulldahl, Henrik Fahlström, Joel Johansson-Berg, Johan Kasperi, Jonatan Nordh, Peder Nordin, Petter Yngvesson, Jakob Engström, Jesper Wigardt
11	Sweden	2	3	12	11	+1	29	25	+4	971	952	+19	Amanda Högström, Jessica Karlsson, Louise Hedberg, Sanne Ekberg, Karoline Kotte, Matilda Lantz, Matilda Petersen, Nathalie Eriksson, Sanna Nygren Strandberg, Sara Theodorsson
12	Bulgaria	1	4	10	13	-3	26	30	-4	992	1038	-46	Borislav Andreev, Ilian Krastev, Peyo Boichinov, Tihomir Hadziev, Sarkis Agopyan
12	Bulgaria	1	4	10	13	-3	26	30	-4	992	1038	-46	Bistra Maneva, Dimitria Popstoikova, Gabriela Banova, Parashkeva Neykova, Rumiana Ivanova
13	Switzerland	2	3	8	15	-7	19	32	-13	849	971	-122	Anthony Dumartheray, Marc Schneidereit, Shane Razi, Thomas Heiniger, Laurent Geijo
13	Switzerland	2	3	8	15	-7	19	32	-13	849	971	-122	Ennia Biedermann, Flurina Spühler, Justine Ling, Tenzin Pelling, Céline Tripet, Cendrine Hantz
14	Turkey	1	4	7	17	-10	19	35	-16	910	1049	-139	Burak Köse, Göksel Kundakçı, Hasan Hüseyin Durakcan, Numan Özkan, Muhammet Bas
14	Turkey	1	4	7	17	-10	19	35	-16	910	1049	-139	Ezgi Epice, Nurdan Ekin, Öznur Çalışkan, Rabia Kemer
15	Estonia	1	4	5	18	-13	13	38	-25	810	1022	-212	Ingmar Seidelberg, Rainer Kaljumäe, Raul Käsner, Madis Reppo, Rajur Hint
15	Estonia	1	4	5	18	-13	13	38	-25	810	1022	-212	Karoliine Hõim, Ketly Freirik, Laura Vana, Getter Saar
16	Portugal	0	5	5	19	-14	16	40	-24	936	1114	-178	Miguel Jardim, Pedro Martins, Pedro Soares, David Sousa, Jorge Guerreiro
16	Portugal	0	5	5	19	-14	16	40	-24	936	1114	-178	Cláudia Figueira, Dalila Belém, Helena Pestana, Ana Reis, Daniela Silva
