= 2007 European Junior Badminton Championships – Boys' doubles =

- Venue: Hermann-Neuberger-Halle
- Location: Völklingen, Germany
- Dates: 4 April 2007 – 8 April 2007
- Competitors: 84 from 28 nations

Medalists
gold medal	Peter Mills; Chris Adcock	England
silver medal	Mads Pieler Kolding; Mads Conrad-Petersen	Denmark
bronze medal	Christian John Skovgaard; Christian Larsen	Denmark
bronze medal	Peter Käsbauer; Lukas Schmidt	Germany

The boys' singles tournament of the 2007 European Junior Badminton Championships was held from 4 to 8 April 2007. Rasmus Bonde and Kasper Henriksen from Denmark clinched this title in the last edition.

== Seeds ==
Click on the seed number of a player to go to their draw section.

1. (Denmark) Christian John Skovgaard / Christian Larsen (semi-finals)
2. (Denmark) Mads Pieler Kolding / Mads Conrad-Petersen (final)
3. (Germany) Peter Käsbauer / Lukas Schmidt (semi-finals)
4. (England) Peter Mills / Chris Adcock (champions)

5. (Croatia) Zvonimir Đurkinjak / Zvonimir Hölbling (third round)
6. (France) Sylvain Grosjean / Laurent Constantin (quarter-finals)
7. (Ukraine) Georgiy Natarov / Dmytro Zavadsky (third round)
8. (Scotland) Paul van Rietvelde / Thomas Bethell (quarter-finals)

== Draw ==
=== Finals ===
Semi-finals
1	(Denmark) Christian John Skovgaard (Denmark) Christian Larsen	15	19
3/4	(England) Peter Mills (England) Chris Adcock	21	21
3/4	(Germany) Peter Käsbauer (Germany) Lukas Schmidt	15	11
2	(Denmark) Mads Pieler Kolding (Denmark) Mads Conrad-Petersen	21	21

Final
3/4	(England) Peter Mills (England) Chris Adcock	21	21
2	(Denmark) Mads Pieler Kolding (Denmark) Mads Conrad-Petersen	16	15

=== Top half ===
==== Section 1 ====
First Round
(Iceland) D Thomsen (Iceland) A Jóhannesson	21	14	16
(Italy) R Maddaloni (Italy) G Greco	19	21	21
(Turkey) M Bas (Turkey) B Köse	23	18	16
(Czech Republic) M Skála (Czech Republic) O Kopřiva	21	21	21

Second Round
1	(Denmark) C J Skovgaard (Denmark) C Larsen	21	21
(Estonia) R Hint (Estonia) M Reppo	6	9
(Switzerland) S Razi (Switzerland) A Dumartheray	21	21
(Italy) R Maddaloni (Italy) G Greco	12	12
5/8	(Ukraine) G Natarov (Ukraine) D Zavadsky	21	21
(Poland) A Dziółko (Poland) Ł Barszczewski	4	11
(Russia) N Khakimov (Russia) I Sozonov	21	21
(Czech Republic) M Skála (Czech Republic) O Kopřiva	7	7

Third Round
1	(Denmark) C J Skovgaard (Denmark) C Larsen	21	21
(Switzerland) S Razi (Switzerland) A Dumartheray	19	15
5/8	(Ukraine) G Natarov (Ukraine) D Zavadsky	14	14
(Russia) N Khakimov (Russia) I Sozonov	21	21

Quarter-finals
1	(Denmark) C J Skovgaard (Denmark) C Larsen	19	21	21
(Russia) N Khakimov (Russia) I Sozonov	21	10	16

==== Section 2 ====
First Round
(Hungary) J Megyesi (Hungary) D Sárosi	12	7
(Scotland) D Leith (Scotland) P Hockey	21	21
(Austria) P Demmelmayer (Austria) D Obernosterer	21	10	19
(Bulgaria) I Krastev (Bulgaria) T Hadziev	12	21	21
(Belgium) F Golinski (Belgium) M Dierickx	17	21	21
(Sweden) J Johansson-Berg (Sweden) P Yngvesson	21	17	18

Second Round
3/4	(England) P Mills (England) C Adcock	21	19	22
(Germany) J Zurwonne (Germany) S Rduch	18	21	20
(Netherlands) J Maas (Netherlands) J Arends	16	21	21
(Scotland) D Leith (Scotland) P Hockey	21	19	17
5/8	(France) S Grosjean (France) L Constantin	21	21
(Slovakia) M Eliáš (Slovakia) M Kozár	9	17
(Bulgaria) I Krastev (Bulgaria) T Hadziev	21	21
(Belgium) F Golinski (Belgium) M Dierickx	15	19

Third Round
3/4	(England) P Mills (England) C Adcock	21	21
(Netherlands) J Maas (Netherlands) J Arends	14	11
5/8	(France) S Grosjean (France) L Constantin	21	21
(Bulgaria) I Krastev (Bulgaria) T Hadziev	14	16

Quarter-finals
3/4	(England) P Mills (England) C Adcock	21	21
5/8	(France) S Grosjean (France) L Constantin	12	15

=== Bottom half ===
==== Section 3 ====
First Round
(Spain) A Barriga (Spain) E Velázquez	26	21
SUB	(Estonia) R Käsner (Estonia) I Seidelberg	24	10
(Israel) M Zilberman (Russia) G Kosenko	15	16
(Sweden) P Nordin (Sweden) J Kasperi	21	21
(Ukraine) D Panchenko (Ukraine) A Burlaka	21	21
(Slovenia) A Turk (Slovenia) M Bajuk	16	9

Second Round
(Spain) A Barriga (Spain) E Velázquez	16	19
(Sweden) P Nordin (Sweden) J Kasperi	21	21
(Netherlands) J Hilbink (Netherlands) S Branderhorst	13	11
5/8	(Scotland) P van Rietvelde (Scotland) T Bethell	21	21
(Ukraine) D Panchenko (Ukraine) A Burlaka	14	18
(Turkey) H H Durakcan (Turkey) G Kundakçı	21	21
(France) E Bourahla (France) M Ranault	11	17
3/4	(Germany) P Käsbauer (Germany) L Schmidt	21	21

Third Round
(Sweden) P Nordin (Sweden) J Kasperi	21	21
5/8	(Scotland) P van Rietvelde (Scotland) Thomas Bethell	15	11
(Turkey) H H Durakcan (Turkey) G Kundakçı	17	11
3/4	(Germany) P Käsbauer (Germany) L Schmidt	21	21

Quarter-finals
(Sweden) P Nordin (Sweden) J Kasperi	15	18
3/4	(Germany) P Käsbauer (Germany) L Schmidt	21	21

==== Section 4 ====
First Round
(Poland) K Raszkiewicz (Poland) P Drozdz	21	21
(Lithuania) A Mizgiris (Lithuania) R Stapušaitis	13	13
(Switzerland) T Heiniger (Switzerland) M Schneiderneit	21	21
(England) V Liew (England) M Ellis	23	23

Second Round
(Poland) K Raszkiewicz (Poland) P Drozdz	21	23
(Bulgaria) P Boichinov (Bulgaria) B Andreev	18	21
(Luxembourg) J Fischbach (Luxembourg) B Speltz	10	14
5/8	(Croatia) Z Đurkinjak (Croatia) Z Hölbling	21	21
(England) V Liew (England) M Ellis	21	15	21
(Portugal) M Jardim (Portugal) P Martins	18	21	14
(Czech Republic) J Vitvera (Czech Republic) P Drancek	7	9
2	(Denmark) M P Kolding (Denmark) M Conrad-Petersen	21	21

Third Round
(Poland) K Raszkiewicz (Poland) P Drozdz	22	21	21
5/8	(Croatia) Z Đurkinjak (Croatia) Z Hölbling	24	17	10
(England) V Liew (England) M Ellis	8	12
2	(Denmark) M P Kolding (Denmark) M Conrad-Petersen	21	21

Quarter-finals
(Poland) K Raszkiewicz (Poland) P Drozdz	7	11
2	(Denmark) M P Kolding (Denmark) M Conrad-Petersen	21	21
