= 2007 European Junior Badminton Championships – Mixed doubles =

- Venue: Hermann-Neuberger-Halle
- Location: Völklingen, Germany
- Dates: 4 April 2007 – 8 April 2007
- Competitors: 128 from 29 nations

Medalists
gold medal	Christian Larsen; Joan Christiansen	Denmark
silver medal	Peter Käsbauer; Julia Schmidt	Germany
bronze medal	Mads Pieler Kolding; Line Damkjær Kruse	Denmark
bronze medal	Mikkel Elbjørn; Maja Bech	Denmark

The mixed doubles tournament of the 2007 European Junior Badminton Championships was held from 4 to 8 April 2007. Rasmus Bonde and Christinna Pedersen from Denmark clinched this title in the last edition.

== Seeds ==
Click on the seed number of a player to go to their draw section.

1. (Denmark) Mads Pieler Kolding / Line Damkjær Kruse (semi-finals)
2. (England) Chris Adcock / Gabrielle White (second round)
3. (Scotland) Thomas Bethell / Jillie Cooper (quarter-finals)
4. (Netherlands) Lester Oey / Samantha Barning (third round)
5. (Czech Republic) Jakub Bitman / Kristína Ludíková (second round)
6. (Denmark) Mikkel Elbjørn / Maja Bech (semi-finals)
7. (Germany) Peter Käsbauer / Julia Schmidt (final)
8. (England) Peter Mills / Mariana Agathangelou (quarter-finals)

9. (France) Laurent Constantin / Émilie Lefel (third round)
10. (Turkey) Hasan Hüseyin Durakcan / Ezgi Epice (first round)
11. (Croatia) Zvonimir Đurkinjak / Staša Poznanović (third round)
12. (England) Marcus Ellis / Samantha Ward (quarter-finals)
13. (Russia) Nikita Khakimov / Victoria Ushkova (first round)
14. (Poland) Maciej Kowalik / Marlena Flis (third round)
15. (Denmark) Christian Larsen / Joan Christiansen (champions)
16. (Ukraine) Dmytro Zavadsky / Mariya Martynenko (third round)

== Draw ==
=== Finals ===
Semi-finals
1	(Denmark) Mads Pieler Kolding (Denmark) Line Damkjær Kruse	13	21	17
9/16	(Denmark) Christian Larsen (Denmark) Joan Christiansen	21	12	21
5/8	(Denmark) Mikkel Elbjørn (Denmark) Maja Bech	16	21	15
5/8	(Germany) Peter Käsbauer (Germany) Julia Schmidt	21	14	21

Final
9/16	(Denmark) Christian Larsen (Denmark) Joan Christiansen	21	14	21
5/8	(Germany) Peter Käsbauer (Germany) Julia Schmidt	16	21	10

=== Top half ===
==== Section 1 ====
First Round
1	(Denmark) M P Kolding (Denmark) L D Kruse	21	21
(Netherlands) J Arends (Netherlands) S Piek	12	17
(Poland) K Raszkiewicz (Poland) M Grządzielska	24	12
(Germany) F Hammes (Germany) N Voigt	26	21
9/16	(Ukraine) D Zavadsky (Ukraine) M Martunenko	21	21
(Switzerland) T Heiniger (Switzerland) E Biedermann	14	16
(Scotland) P van Rietvelde (Scotland) G Sloan	17	21	21
(Lithuania) A Mizgiris (Lithuania) G Voitechovskaja	21	14	11
5/8	(England) P Mills (England) M Agathangelou	21	21
(Czech Republic) M Skála (Czech Republic) S Křížková	6	12
(Finland) E Heino (Finland) N Vainio	21	21
(Estonia) R Käsner (Estonia) L Vana	15	15
9/16	(Russia) N Khakimov (Russia) V Ushkova
(Spain) L Siles (Spain) S Chirlaque	w	/	o
(Hungary) J Megyesi (Hungary) Z Horváth	21	18	16
(Austria) M Bertsch (Austria) E Baldauf	17	21	21

Second Round
1	(Denmark) M P Kolding (Denmark) L D Kruse	21	21
(Germany) F Hammes (Germany) N Voigt	16	13
9/16	(Ukraine) D Zavadsky (Ukraine) M Martunenko	21	21
(Scotland) P van Rietvelde (Scotland) G Sloan	13	18
5/8	(England) P Mills (England) M Agathangelou	21	21
(Finland) E Heino (Finland) N Vainio	17	16
(Spain) L Siles (Spain) S Chirlaque	17	21	21
(Austria) M Bertsch (Austria) E Baldauf	21	12	17

Third Round
1	(Denmark) M P Kolding (Denmark) L D Kruse	21	21
9/16	(Ukraine) D Zavadsky (Ukraine) M Martunenko	8	17
5/8	(England) P Mills (England) M Agathangelou	21	21
(Spain) L Siles (Spain) S Chirlaque	15	8

Quarter-finals
1	(Denmark) M P Kolding (Denmark) L D Kruse	21	21
5/8	(England) P Mills (England) M Agathangelou	18	11

==== Section 2 ====
First Round
3/4	(Netherlands) L Oey (Netherlands) S Barning	21	21
(Ukraine) A Burlaka (Ukraine) O Chkheidze	18	11
(France) S Grosjean (France) S Callon	23	18	19
SUB	(Sweden) H Fahlström (Russia) K Polikarpova	21	21	21
9/16	(Denmark) C Larsen (Denmark) J Christiansen	21	21
(Slovenia) M Bajuk (Slovenia) T Delak	17	18
(Italy) R Maddaloni (Italy) A Tiburzi	12	11
(Slovakia) M Kozár (Slovakia) Z Orlovská	21	21
5/8	(Czech Republic) J Bitman (Czech Republic) K Ludíková	21	21
(England) V Liew (England) L Cousins	10	15
(Germany) J Zurwonne (Germany) D Kaufhold	21	21
(Bulgaria) T Hadziev (Bulgaria) R Ivanova	19	18
9/16	(England) M Ellis (England) S Ward	21	21
(Croatia) Z Hölbling (Croatia) P Petranović	11	15
(Luxembourg) P Hengen (Luxembourg) C Bernig	21	21
(Turkey) N Özkan (Turkey) N Ekin	13	11

Second Round
3/4	(Netherlands) L Oey (Netherlands) S Barning	21	14	21
SUB	(Sweden) H Fahlström (Russia) K Polikarpova	17	21	17
9/16	(Denmark) C Larsen (Denmark) J Christiansen	21	21
(Slovakia) M Kozár (Slovakia) Z Orlovská	11	4
5/8	(Czech Republic) J Bitman (Czech Republic) K Ludíková	12	23	13
(Germany) J Zurwonne (Germany) D Kaufhold	21	21	21
9/16	(England) M Ellis (England) S Ward	21	21
(Luxembourg) P Hengen (Luxembourg) C Bernig	10	15

Third Round
3/4	(Netherlands) L Oey (Netherlands) S Barning	15	18
9/16	(Denmark) C Larsen (Denmark) J Christiansen	21	21
(Germany) J Zurwonne (Germany) D Kaufhold	17	14
9/16	(England) M Ellis (England) S Ward	21	21

Quarter-finals
9/16	(Denmark) C Larsen (Denmark) J Christiansen	21	20	21
9/16	(England) M Ellis (England) S Ward	13	22	13

=== Bottom half ===
==== Section 3 ====
First Round
(Switzerland) L Geijo (Switzerland) C Tripet	10	21	20
(Bulgaria) P Boichinov (Bulgaria) G Bonava	21	15	22
(Russia) I Sozonov (Russia) A Panushkina	21	21
9/16	(Turkey) H Hüseyin Durakcan (Turkey) E Epice	19	13
(Poland) P Drozdz (Poland) N Pocztowiak	19	17
(Sweden) J Nordh (Sweden) L Hedberg	21	21
(Sweden) J Kasperi (Sweden) S Ekberg	15	13
5/8	(Denmark) M Elbjørn (Denmark) M Bech	21	21
(Slovenia) I Utroša (Slovenia) N Koncut	19	21	14
SUB	(Sweden) P Nordin (Estonia) K Hõim	21	19	21
(Iceland) D Thomsen (Iceland) H R Matthíasdóttir	9	18
9/16	(Poland) M Kowalik (Poland) M Flis	21	21
(Estonia) I Seidelberg (Estonia) K Freirik	15	21	12
(Czech Republic) P Drancek (Czech Republic) E Maixnerová	21	17	21
(Russia) G Kosenko (Russia) L Chudentceva	12	19
3/4	(Scotland) T Bethell (Scotland) J Cooper	21	21

Second Round
(Bulgaria) P Boichinov (Bulgaria) G Bonava	15	10
(Russia) I Sozonov (Russia) A Panushkina	21	21
(Sweden) J Nordh (Sweden) L Hedberg	21	11	11
5/8	(Denmark) M Elbjørn (Denmark) M Bech	18	21	21
SUB	(Sweden) P Nordin (Estonia) K Hõim	11	20
9/16	(Poland) M Kowalik (Poland) M Flis	21	21
(Czech Republic) P Drancek (Czech Republic) E Maixnerová	16	5
3/4	(Scotland) T Bethell (Scotland) J Cooper	21	21

Third Round
(Russia) I Sozonov (Russia) A Panushkina	15	13
5/8	(Denmark) M Elbjørn (Denmark) M Bech	21	21
9/16	(Poland) M Kowalik (Poland) M Flis	21	18	11
3/4	(Scotland) T Bethell (Scotland) J Cooper	18	21	21

Quarter-finals
5/8	(Denmark) M Elbjørn (Denmark) M Bech	21	25
3/4	(Scotland) T Bethell (Scotland) J Cooper	15	23

==== Section 4 ====
First Round
(Spain) A Barriga (Spain) L Molina	21	11	21
(Belgium) D Maquet (Belgium) S Corvilain	17	21	16
(Republic of Ireland) S Magee (Republic of Ireland) C Magee	21	20	16
9/16	(France) L Constantin (France) É Lefel	12	22	21
(Bulgaria) B Andreev (Bulgaria) B Maneva	15	16
(Ukraine) G Natarov (Ukraine) O Mashchenko	21	21
(Scotland) P Hockey (Scotland) A Marr	12	11
5/8	(Germany) P Käsbauer (Germany) J Schmidt	21	21
(Netherlands) Q Thies (Netherlands) E Muskens	21	18
(Slovakia) J Vícen (Slovakia) A Starostova	14	10^{r}
(Germany) P Welker (Germany) C Nelte	13	17
9/16	(Croatia) Z Đurkinjak (Croatia) S Poznanović	21	21
(Denmark) C J Skovgaard (Denmark) M Thorberg	21	21
(Austria) D Obernosterer (Austria) M Mathis	9	16
(Netherlands) J Maas (Netherlands) I Tabeling	13	17
2	(England) C Adcock (England) G White	21	21

Second Round
(Spain) A Barriga (Spain) L Molina	15	16
9/16	(France) L Constantin (France) É Lefel	21	21
(Ukraine) G Natarov (Ukraine) O Mashchenko	14	15
5/8	(Germany) P Käsbauer (Germany) J Schmidt	21	21
(Netherlands) Q Thies (Netherlands) E Muskens	16	10
9/16	(Croatia) Z Đurkinjak (Croatia) S Poznanović	21	21
(Denmark) C J Skovgaard (Denmark) M Thorberg	15	21	21
2	(England) C Adcock (England) G White	21	19	19

Third Round
9/16	(France) L Constantin (France) É Lefel	16	16
5/8	(Germany) P Käsbauer (Germany) J Schmidt	21	21
9/16	(Croatia) Z Đurkinjak (Croatia) S Poznanović	18	22	14
(Denmark) C J Skovgaard (Denmark) M Thorberg	21	20	21

Quarter-finals
5/8	(Germany) P Käsbauer (Germany) J Schmidt	21	21
(Denmark) C J Skovgaard (Denmark) M Thorberg	19	15
