= 2007 European Junior Badminton Championships – Boys' singles =

- Venue: Hermann-Neuberger-Halle
- Location: Völklingen, Germany
- Dates: 4 April 2007 – 8 April 2007
- Competitors: 64 from 33 nations

Medalists
gold medal	Mads Conrad-Petersen	Denmark
silver medal	Gabriel Ulldahl	Sweden
bronze medal	Ernesto Velázquez	Spain
bronze medal	Lester Oey	Netherlands

The boys' singles tournament of the 2007 European Junior Badminton Championships was held from 4 to 8 April 2007. Rajiv Ouseph from England clinched this title in the last edition.

== Seeds ==
Click on the seed number of a player to go to their draw section.

1. (Ukraine) Dmytro Zavadsky (quarter-finals)
2. (Netherlands) Lester Oey (semi-finals)
3. (Denmark) Mads Conrad-Petersen (champion)
4. (Sweden) Gabriel Ulldahl (final)
5. (Czech Republic) Jakub Bitman (third round)
6. (Germany) Fabian Hammes (third round)
7. (Portugal) Pedro Martins (quarter-finals)
8. (Scotland) Kieran Merrilees (quarter-finals)

9. (Russia) Nikita Khakimov (third round)
10. (Poland) Maciej Kowalik (first round)
11. (Denmark) Martin Kragh (third round)
12. (Norway) Hallstein Oma (second round)
13. (France) Maxime Renault (third round)
14. (Germany) Lukas Schmidt (third round)
15. (Russia) Ivan Sozonov (third round)
16. (Netherlands) Quintus Thies (first round)

== Draw ==
=== Finals ===
Semi-finals
(Spain) Ernesto Velázquez	14	20
3/4	(Denmark) Mads Conrad-Petersen	21	22
3/4	(Sweden) Gabriel Ulldahl	21	21
2	(Netherlands) Lesten Oey	13	15

Final
3/4	(Denmark) Mads Conrad-Petersen	17	21	21
3/4	(Sweden) Gabriel Ulldahl	21	18	9

=== Top half ===
==== Section 1 ====
First Round
1	(Ukraine) D Zavadsky	21	21
(Germany) S Rduch	17	12
(Luxembourg) P Hengen	21	22	12
(Bulgaria) P Boichinov	9	24	21
9/16	(Russia) N Khakimov	17	21	21
(France) M Michel	21	19	10
(Portugal) M Jardim	18	21	22
(Estonia) R Kaljumäe	21	19	20
5/8	(Czech Republic) J Bitman	26	21
(England) R Kettle	24	8
(Slovenia) I Utroša	21	21
SUB	(Bulgaria) I Krastev	17	17
9/16	(Norway) H Oma	21	21
(Lithuania) R Stapušaitis	9	13
(Spain) E Velázquez	21	18	21
(Turkey) H Hüseyin Durakcan	14	21	12

Second Round
1	(Ukraine) D Zavadsky	21	21
(Bulgaria) P Boichinov	14	18
9/16	(Russia) N Khakimov	21	16	21
(Portugal) M Jardim	14	21	10
5/8	(Czech Republic) J Bitman	21	21
(Slovenia) I Utroša	16	18
9/16	(Norway) H Oma	17	16
(Spain) E Velázquez	21	21

Third Round
1	(Ukraine) D Zavadsky	21	21
9/16	(Russia) N Khakimov	14	17
5/8	(Czech Republic) J Bitman	21	19	13
(Spain) E Velázquez	17	21	21

Quarter-finals
1	(Ukraine) D Zavadsky	12	20
(Spain) E Velázquez	21	22

==== Section 2 ====
First Round
3/4	(Denmark) M Conrad-Petersen	21	21
(Sweden) P Yngvesson	10	10
(Finland) E Heino	21	19	18
(England) C Hotchen	17	21	21
9/16	(Netherlands) Q Thies	14	20
(England) B Peake	21	22
(Switzerland) S Razi	21	21	23
(Republic of Ireland) S Magee	23	17	25
5/8	(Germany) F Hammes	21	21
(Netherlands) J Hilbink	8	12
(Iceland) A Jóhannesson	21	12
(Bulgaria) B Andreev	23	21
9/16	(Poland) M Kowalik	16	21	9
(Scotland) S McPhail	21	17	21
(Hungary) D Sárosi	13	11
(Sweden) H Fablström	21	21

Second Round
3/4	(Denmark) M Conrad-Petersen	21	21
(England) C Hotchen	19	14
(England) B Peake	21	12	21
(Republic of Ireland) S Magee	11	21	19
5/8	(Germany) F Hammes	21	21
(Bulgaria) B Andreev	16	13
(Scotland) S McPhail	15	15
(Sweden) H Fablström	21	21

Third Round
3/4	(Denmark) M Conrad-Petersen	21	'21
(England) B Peake	14	14
5/8	(Germany) F Hammes	16	18
(Sweden) H Fablström	21	21

Quarter-finals
3/4	(Denmark) M Conrad-Petersen	21	21
(Sweden) H Fablström	16	17

=== Bottom half ===
==== Section 3 ====
First Round
(Turkey) G Kundakçı	22	21
(Switzerland) A Dumartheray	20	14
(Italy) G Greco	9	12
9/16	(Germany) L Schmidt	21	21
(Israel) M Zilberman	18	21	21
(Slovakia) J Vícen	21	14	11
(Netherlands) S Branderhorst	21	16	16
5/8	(Portugal) P Martins	18	21	21
(Austria) D Obernosterer	21	21
(Ukraine) A Burlaka	16	12
(Bulgaria) T Hadziev	21	19	15
9/16	(France) M Renault	16	21	21
(Russia) G Kosenko	21	21
(Wales) J van Hooijdonk	19	18
(France) A Françoise	7	19
3/4	(Sweden) G Ulldahl	21	21

Second Round
(Turkey) G Kundakçı	15	21	11
9/16	(Germany) L Schmidt	21	17	21
(Israel) M Zilberman	10	12
5/8	(Portugal) P Martins	21	21
(Austria) D Obernosterer	19	21	18
9/16	(France) M Renault	21	19	21
(Russia) G Kosenko	13	13
3/4	(Sweden) G Ulldahl	21	21

Third Round
9/16	(Germany) L Schmidt	15	18
5/8	(Portugal) P Martins	21	21
9/16	(France) M Renault	13	11
3/4	(Sweden) G Ulldahl	21	21

Quarter-finals
5/8	(Portugal) P Martins	14	21	10
3/4	(Sweden) G Ulldahl	21	19	21

==== Section 4 ====
First Round
(Cyprus) V Vasou	8	21	20
(Croatia) I Čimbur	21	19	22
(Poland) Ł Barszczewski	22	19
9/16	(Denmark) M Kragh	24	21
(Czech Republic) O Kopřiva	8	11
(England) J Bonsels	21	21
(Germany) P Welker	12	18
5/8	(Scotland) K Merrilees	21	21
(Belgium) D Maquet	16	8
(Estonia) I Seidelberg	21	21
SUB	(Poland) A Dziółko	14	17
9/16	(Russia) I Sozonov	21	21
(Sweden) J Johansson-Berg	20	21	21
(Czech Republic) P Drancek	22	10	15
(Ukraine) D Panchenko	11	16
2	(Netherlands) L Oey	21	21

Second Round
(Croatia) I Čimbur	13	20
9/16	(Denmark) M Kragh	21	22
(England) J Bonsels	15	16
5/8	(Scotland) K Merrilees	21	21
(Estonia) I Seidelberg	12	16
9/16	(Russia) I Sozonov	21	21
(Sweden) J Johansson-Berg	13	18
2	(Netherlands) L Oey	21	21

Third Round
9/16	(Denmark) M Kragh	14	17
5/8	(Scotland) K Merrilees	21	21
9/16	(Russia) I Sozonov	14	21	11
2	(Netherlands) L Oey	21	17	21

Quarter-finals
5/8	(Scotland) K Merrilees	13	20
2	(Netherlands) L Oey	21	22
