= Ernesto Velázquez =

Spanish badminton player (born 1988)

Personal information
- Born: Ernesto Velázquez Ruiz-Mateos; 3 October 1988 (age 38)

Sport
- Country: Spain
- Sport: Badminton

Men's singles & doubles
- Highest ranking: 77 (MS 29 October 2015); 340 (MD 22 October 2009); 338 (XD 15 October 2009)
- BWF profile
Medal record
Men's badminton
Representing Spain
European Junior Championships
Bronze medal – third place	2007 Völklingen	Boys' singles

Ernesto Velázquez Ruiz-Mateos (Note: In this Spanish name, the first or paternal surname is Velázquez and the second or maternal family name is Ruiz-Mateos.) (born 3 October 1988) is a Spanish badminton player. He won the bronze medal at the 2007 European Junior Championships in the boys' singles event. He emerged as the mixed doubles champion at the National Championships in 2011–2013. He retired from the international competition in November 2017.

== Achievements ==
=== European Junior Championships ===
Boys' singles
Year	Venue	Opponent	Score	Result
2007	Hermann-Neuberger-Halle, Völklingen; Saarbrücken, Germany	(Denmark) Mads Conrad-Petersen	14–21, 20–22	Bronze

=== BWF International Challenge/Series ===
Men's singles
Year	Tournament	Opponent	Score	Result
2009	Cyprus International	(France) Simon Maunoury	16–21, 13–21	(silver) Runner-up
2010	Uganda International	(Nigeria) Jinkan Ifraimu	21–18, 20–22, 13–21	(silver) Runner-up
2015	Hungarian International	(Estonia) Raul Must	21–14, 21–17	(gold) Winner
2015	Internacional Mexicano	(Cuba) Osleni Guerrero	21–13, 21–14	(gold) Winner
2015	Maribyrnong International	(Chinese Taipei) Lu Chia-hung	15–21, 18–21	(silver) Runner-up
2015	Chile International Challenge	(Spain) Pablo Abián	14–21, 17–21	(silver) Runner-up

BWF International Challenge tournament
BWF International Series tournament
BWF Future Series tournament
