= Gabriel Ulldahl =

Swedish badminton player (born 1988)

Personal information
- Born: 24 October 1988 (age 38) Vänersborg, Sweden

Sport
- Country: Sweden
- Sport: Badminton

Men's singles
- Highest ranking: 87 (2 May 2013)
- BWF profile
Medal record
Men's badminton
Representing Sweden
European Men's Team Championships
Bronze medal – third place	2026 Istanbul	Men's team
European Junior Championships
Silver medal – second place	2007 Völklingen	Boys' singles

Gabriel Ulldahl (born 24 October 1988) is a Swedish badminton player who affiliated with Västra Frölunda team. He was the silver medalist at the 2007 European Junior Championships in the boys' singles event. Ulldahl won four men's singles title at the Swedish National Championships.

== Achievements ==
=== European Junior Championships ===
Boys' singles
Year	Venue	Opponent	Score	Result
2007	Hermann-Neuberger-Halle, Völklingen; Saarbrücken, Germany	(Denmark) Mads Conrad-Petersen	21–17, 18–21, 9–21	Silver

=== BWF International Challenge/Series (3 runners-up) ===
Men's singles
Year	Tournament	Opponent	Score	Result
2012	Spanish Open	(France) Brice Leverdez	14–21, 24–22, 18–21	(silver) Runner-up
2016	Portugal International	(Sri Lanka) Niluka Karunaratne	17–21, 13–21	(silver) Runner-up
2016	Hellas Open	(Denmark) Kim Bruun	21–12, 19–21, 20–22	(silver) Runner-up

BWF International Challenge tournament
BWF International Series tournament
BWF Future Series tournament
