= Mikkel Elbjørn =

Danish badminton player (born 1989)

Personal information
- Born: Mikkel Elbjørn Larsen; 15 August 1989 (age 36) Hvidovre, Denmark

Sport
- Country: Denmark
- Sport: Badminton

Men's & mixed doubles
- Highest ranking: 38 (MD) 26 August 2010; 119 (XD) 21 January 2010
- BWF profile
Medal record
European Junior Championships
Bronze medal – third place	2007 Völklingen	Mixed doubles
Bronze medal – third place	2007 Völklingen	Mixed team

Mikkel Elbjørn Larsen (born 15 August 1989 in Hvidovre) is a Danish badminton player. Larsen started playing badminton at aged 4 at Kastrup-Magleby Badminton Klub (KMB). In 2006–2007 season, he won the mixed doubles title at the Danish National U-19 Championships, and in 2007–2008 season, he retain the title and also won the boys' doubles title. In 2007, he won the bronze medals at the European Junior Championships in the mixed doubles and team event. In the national event, he play and for the KMB and had also played for the Lillerød Badmintonklub for two years.

== Achievements ==
=== European Junior Championships ===
Mixed doubles

Year	Venue	Partner	Opponent	Score	Result
2007	Hermann-Neuberger-Halle, Völklingen, Saarbrücken, Germany	(Denmark) Maja Bech	(Germany) Peter Käsbauer (Germany) Julia Schmidt	16–21, 21–14, 15–21	Bronze

=== BWF International Challenge/Series ===
Men's doubles

Year	Tournament	Partner	Opponent	Score	Result
2011	Denmark International	(Denmark) Christian John Skovgaard	(Denmark) Rasmus Bonde (Denmark) Anders Kristiansen	14–21, 21–19, 16–21	(silver) Runner-up
2010	Dutch International	(Denmark) Christian John Skovgaard	(Denmark) Mads Conrad-Petersen (Denmark) Mads Pieler Kolding	17–21, 14–21	(silver) Runner-up
2010	Swedish International	(Denmark) Christian John Skovgaard	(England) Chris Langridge (England) Robin Middleton	11–21, 18–21	(silver) Runner-up
2009	Czech International	(Denmark) Christian John Skovgaard	(Denmark) Mads Conrad-Petersen (Denmark) Mads Pieler Kolding	14–21, 21–17, 9–21	(silver) Runner-up
2007	Hellas International	(Denmark) Mads Pieler Kolding	(Malaysia) Goh Ying Jin (Malaysia) Au Kok Leong	19–21, 18–21	(silver) Runner-up

BWF International Challenge tournament
BWF International Series tournament
BWF Future Series tournament
