= Paul van Rietvelde =

Scottish badminton player

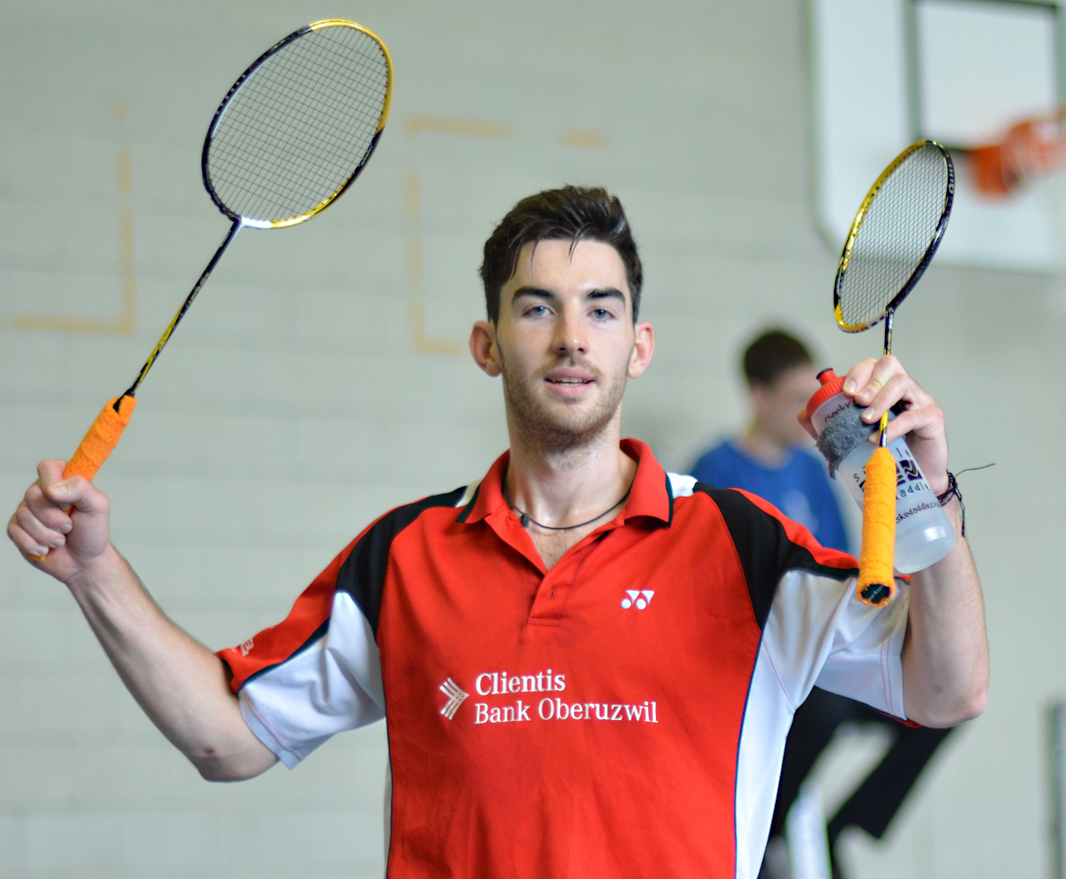

Personal information
- Nationality: British
- Born: 7 August 1991 (age 35) Edinburgh, Scotland
- Height: 1.85 m (6 ft 1 in)
- Weight: 80 kg (176 lb)

Sport
- Country: Scotland
- Sport: Badminton
- Coached by: Diana Koleva; Rita Yuan Gao

Men's & mixed doubles
- Highest ranking: 33 (MD 16 May 2013); 119 (XD 19 Apr 2012)

Paul van Rietvelde (born 7 August 1991) is a former international badminton player from Scotland who competed at two Commonwealth Games.

== Biography ==
Paul van Rietvelde represented the Scottish team at the 2010 Commonwealth Games in Delhi, India, where he competed in the badminton events.

In 2014, he was based in Milton Keynes and represented the Scottish team again at the 2014 Commonwealth Games in Glasgow, Scotland, where he competed in the badminton events.

He was twice men's doubles champion and once mixed doubles champion at the Scottish National Badminton Championships.

== Achievements ==
=== BWF International Challenge/Series (3 titles, 2 runners-up) ===
Men's doubles

Year	Tournament	Partner	Opponent	Score	Result
2013	Denmark International	(England) Marcus Ellis	(Denmark) Anders Skaarup Rasmussen (Denmark) Kim Astrup	25–23, 16–21, 21–19	(gold) Winner
2012	Welsh International	(England) Marcus Ellis	(England) Peter Briggs (England) Harley Towler	16–21, 21–9, 21–16	(gold) Winner
2012	Belgian International	(England) Marcus Ellis	(Poland) Adam Cwalina (Netherlands) Koen Ridder	18–21, 17–21	(silver) Runner-up
2012	Portugal International	(England) Marcus Ellis	(Croatia) Zvonimir Durkinjak (Denmark) Nikolaj Overgaard	12–21, 20–22	(silver) Runner-up
2011	Turkey Open Antalya	(England) Ben Stawski	(Denmark) Mikkel Mikkelsen (Denmark) Nikolaj Overgaard	21–19, 21–13	(gold) Winner

BWF International Challenge tournament
BWF International Series tournament
BWF Future Series tournament
