= Mads Conrad-Petersen =

Danish badminton player (born 1988)

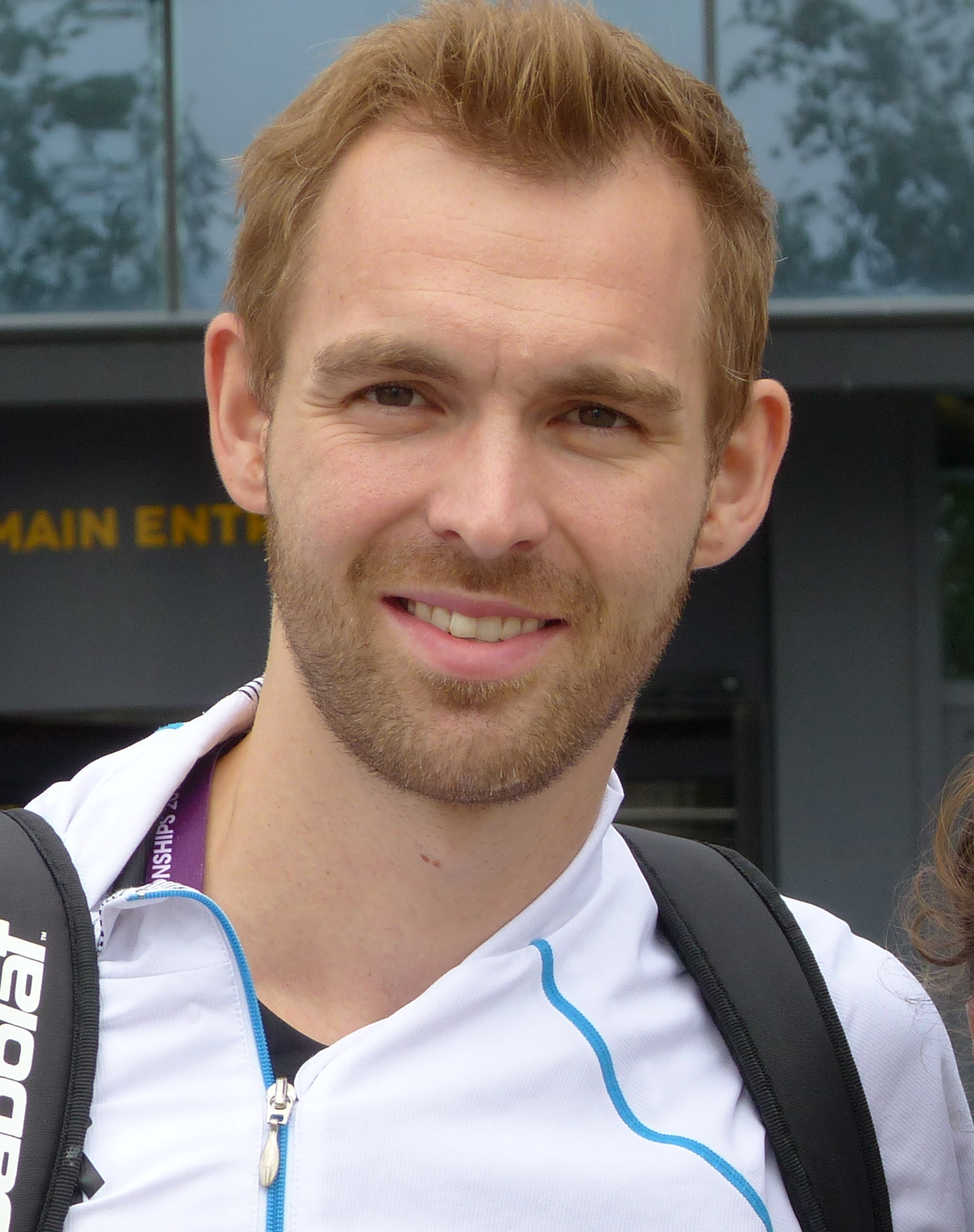
- Conrad-Petersen at the 2017 World Championships

Personal information
- Born: 12 January 1988 (age 38) Askov, Vejen, Denmark
- Height: 1.86 m (6 ft 1 in)
- Weight: 86 kg (190 lb)

Sport
- Country: Denmark
- Sport: Badminton
- Handedness: Right
- Retired: 20 May 2020

Men's doubles
- Highest ranking: 4 (with Mads Pieler Kolding 14 May 2018)
- BWF profile
Medal record
Men's badminton
Representing Denmark
Sudirman Cup
Silver medal – second place	2011 Qingdao	Mixed team
Thomas Cup
Gold medal – first place	2016 Kunshan	Men's team
Bronze medal – third place	2012 Wuhan	Men's team
Bronze medal – third place	2018 Bangkok	Men's team
European Championships
Gold medal – first place	2016 La Roche-sur-Yon	Men's doubles
Silver medal – second place	2014 Kazan	Men's doubles
Silver medal – second place	2017 Kolding	Men's doubles
Silver medal – second place	2018 Huelva	Men's doubles
European Mixed Team Championships
Gold medal – first place	2015 Leuven	Mixed team
Gold medal – first place	2017 Lubin	Mixed team
European Men's Team Championships
Gold medal – first place	2012 Amsterdam	Men's team
Gold medal – first place	2014 Basel	Men's team
Gold medal – first place	2016 Kazan	Men's team
Gold medal – first place	2018 Kazan	Men's team
Gold medal – first place	2020 Liévin	Men's team
European Junior Championships
Gold medal – first place	2007 Völklingen	Boys' singles
Silver medal – second place	2007 Völklingen	Boys' doubles
Bronze medal – third place	2007 Völklingen	Mixed team

Mads Conrad-Petersen (born 12 January 1988) is a Danish former badminton player. He won the gold medal at the 2016 European Championships in the men's doubles event partnered with Mads Pieler Kolding. He also a part of the Denmark national team who won the 2016 Thomas Cup.

== Achievements ==
=== European Championships ===
Men's doubles
Year	Venue	Partner	Opponent	Score	Result
2014	Gymnastics Center Kazan; Kazan, Russia	(Denmark) Mads Pieler Kolding	(Russia) Vladimir Ivanov (Russia) Ivan Sozonov	13–21, 16–21	Silver
2016	Vendéspace; La Roche-sur-Yon, France	(Denmark) Mads Pieler Kolding	(Denmark) Kim Astrup (Denmark) Anders Skaarup Rasmussen	14–21, 21–18, 21–13	Gold
2017	Sydbank Arena; Kolding, Denmark	(Denmark) Mads Pieler Kolding	(Denmark) Mathias Boe (Denmark) Carsten Mogensen	16–21, 20–22	Silver
2018	Palacio de los Deportes Carolina Marín; Huelva, Spain	(Denmark) Mads Pieler Kolding	(Denmark) Kim Astrup (Denmark) Anders Skaarup Rasmussen	15–21, retired	Silver

=== European Junior Championships ===
Boys' singles
Year	Venue	Opponent	Score	Result
2007	Hermann-Neuberger-Halle, Völklingen, Germany	(Sweden) Gabriel Ulldahl	17–21, 21–18, 21–9	Gold

Boys' doubles
Year	Venue	Partner	Opponent	Score	Result
2007	Hermann-Neuberger-Halle; Völklingen, Germany	(Denmark) Mads Pieler Kolding	(England) Chris Adcock (England) Peter Mills	16–21, 15–21	Silver

=== BWF World Tour (2 titles) ===
The BWF World Tour, which was announced on 19 March 2017 and implemented in 2018, is a series of elite badminton tournaments sanctioned by the Badminton World Federation (BWF). The BWF World Tour is divided into levels of World Tour Finals, Super 1000, Super 750, Super 500, Super 300, and the BWF Tour Super 100.

Men's doubles
Year	Tournament	Level	Partner	Opponent	Score	Result
2019	Canada Open	Super 100	(Denmark) Mathias Boe	(Japan) Hiroki Okamura (Japan) Masayuki Onodera	21–12, 21–18	(gold) Winner
2019	Russian Open	Super 100	(Denmark) Mathias Boe	(Japan) Keiichiro Matsui (Japan) Yoshinori Takeuchi	21–18, 21–13	(gold) Winner

=== BWF Superseries ===
The BWF Superseries, which was launched on 14 December 2006 and implemented in 2007, was a series of elite badminton tournaments, sanctioned by the Badminton World Federation (BWF). BWF Superseries levels were Superseries and Superseries Premier. A season of Superseries consisted of twelve tournaments around the world that had been introduced since 2011. Successful players were invited to the Superseries Finals, which were held at the end of each year.

Men's doubles
Year	Tournament	Partner	Opponent	Score	Result
2011	Malaysia Open	(Denmark) Jonas Rasmussen	(China) Chai Biao (China) Guo Zhendong	16–21, 14–21	(silver) Runner-up
2015	India Open	(Denmark) Mads Pieler Kolding	(China) Chai Biao (China) Hong Wei	18–21, 14–21	(silver) Runner-up
2015	French Open	(Denmark) Mads Pieler Kolding	(South Korea) Lee Yong-dae (South Korea) Yoo Yeon-seong	14–21, 19–21	(silver) Runner-up
2017	Hong Kong Open	(Denmark) Mads Pieler Kolding	(Indonesia) Marcus Fernaldi Gideon (Indonesia) Kevin Sanjaya Sukamuljo	12–21, 18–21	(silver) Runner-up

BWF Super Series Finals tournament
BWF Super Series Premier tournament
BWF Super Series tournament

=== BWF Grand Prix ===
The BWF Grand Prix had two levels, the Grand Prix and Grand Prix Gold. It was a series of badminton tournaments sanctioned by the Badminton World Federation (BWF) and played between 2007 and 2017.

Men's doubles
Year	Tournament	Partner	Opponent	Score	Result
2013	Bitburger Open	(Denmark) Mads Pieler Kolding	(Denmark) Kim Astrup (Denmark) Anders Skaarup Rasmussen	21–11, 21–16	(gold) Winner
2013	Scottish Open	(Denmark) Mads Pieler Kolding	(Denmark) Kim Astrup (Denmark) Anders Skaarup Rasmussen	Walkover	(gold) Winner
2015	German Open	(Denmark) Mads Pieler Kolding	(Russia) Vladimir Ivanov (Russia) Ivan Sozonov	22–20, 21–19	(gold) Winner
2015	Bitburger Open	(Denmark) Mads Pieler Kolding	(Russia) Vladimir Ivanov (Russia) Ivan Sozonov	21–18, 21–18	(gold) Winner
2017	German Open	(Denmark) Mads Pieler Kolding	(Denmark) Kim Astrup (Denmark) Anders Skaarup Rasmussen	17–21, 13–21	(silver) Runner-up

BWF Grand Prix Gold tournament
BWF Grand Prix tournament

=== BWF International Challenge/Series ===
Men's doubles
Year	Tournament	Partner	Opponent	Score	Result
2009	Scottish International	(Denmark) Mads Pieler Kolding	(England) Chris Langridge (England) Robin Middleton	19–21, 26–24, 21–16	(gold) Winner
2009	Dutch International	(Denmark) Mads Pieler Kolding	(Netherlands) Ruud Bosch (Netherlands) Koen Ridder	21–14, 22–20	(gold) Winner
2009	Croatian International	(Denmark) Mads Pieler Kolding	(Japan) Naoki Kawamae (Japan) Shoji Sato	21–15, 21–19	(gold) Winner
2009	Czech International	(Denmark) Mads Pieler Kolding	(Denmark) Mikkel Elbjørn (Denmark) Christian Skovgaard	21–14, 17–21, 21–9	(gold) Winner
2009	Irish International	(Denmark) Mads Pieler Kolding	(England) Marcus Ellis (England) Peter Mills	21–18, 21–11	(gold) Winner
2010	Dutch International	(Denmark) Mads Pieler Kolding	(Denmark) Mikkel Elbjørn (Denmark) Christian Skovgaard	21–17, 21–14	(gold) Winner
2019	Spanish International	(Denmark) Mathias Boe	(Denmark) Joel Eipe (Denmark) Rasmus Kjær	21–11, 21–10	(gold) Winner

Mixed doubles
Year	Tournament	Partner	Opponent	Score	Result
2009	Czech International	(Denmark) Anne Skelbæk	(Indonesia) Indra Viki Okvana (Indonesia) Gustiani Megawati	11–21, 13–21	(silver) Runner-up

BWF International Challenge tournament
BWF International Series tournament
