= Christian John Skovgaard =

Danish badminton player (born 1989)

Christian Skovgaard
Personal information
- Born: Christian John Skovgaard; 1 August 1989 (age 36)

Sport
- Country: Denmark
- Sport: Badminton

Men's & mixed doubles
- Highest ranking: 35 (MD 15 October 2009); 63 (XD 22 October 2009)
- BWF profile
Medal record
Men's badminton
Representing Denmark
European Junior Championships
Bronze medal – third place	2007 Völklingen	Boys' doubles
Bronze medal – third place	2007 Völklingen	Mixed team

Christian John Skovgaard (born 1 August 1989) is a Danish badminton player.

== Achievements ==
=== European Junior Championships ===
Boys' doubles

Year	Venue	Partner	Opponent	Score	Result
2007	Hermann-Neuberger-Halle, Völklingen, Saarbrücken, Germany	(Denmark) Christian Larsen	(England) Chris Adcock (England) Peter Mills	15–21, 19–21	Bronze

=== BWF International Challenge/Series ===
Men's doubles

Year	Tournament	Partner	Opponent	Score	Result
2007	Cyprus International	(Denmark) Christian Larsen	(Denmark) Morten Kronborg (Denmark) Christopher Bruun Jensen	22–20, 24–22	(gold) Winner
2008	Czech International	(Denmark) Kasper Faust Henriksen	(Denmark) Jacob Chemnitz (Denmark) Mikkel Delbo Larsen	21–16, 21–16	(gold) Winner
2008	Hungarian International	(Denmark) Kasper Faust Henriksen	(Germany) Maurice Niesner (Germany) Till Zander	21–12, 21–12	(gold) Winner
2009	Polish International	(Denmark) Kasper Faust Henriksen	(Chinese Taipei) Chen Hung-ling (Chinese Taipei) Lin Yu-lang	14–21, 21–17, 19–21	(silver) Runner-up
2009	Czech International	(Denmark) Mikkel Elbjørn	(Denmark) Mads Conrad-Petersen (Denmark) Mads Pieler Kolding	14–21, 21–17, 9–21	(silver) Runner-up
2010	Swedish International	(Denmark) Mikkel Elbjørn	(England) Chris Langridge (England) Robin Middleton	11–21, 18–21	(silver) Runner-up
2010	Dutch International	(Denmark) Mikkel Elbjørn	(Denmark) Mads Conrad-Petersen (Denmark) Mads Pieler Kolding	17–21, 14–21	(silver) Runner-up
2011	Denmark International	(Denmark) Mikkel Elbjørn	(Denmark) Rasmus Bonde (Denmark) Anders Kristiansen	14–21, 21–19, 16–21	(silver) Runner-up
2012	Denmark International	(Denmark) Mads Pieler Kolding	(Denmark) Kasper Antonsen (Denmark) Rasmus Bonde	21–17, 21–10	(gold) Winner

Mixed doubles

Year	Tournament	Partner	Opponent	Score	Result
2007	Cyprus International	(Denmark) Maria Kaaberbol Thorberg	(India) Chetan Anand (India) Jwala Gutta	14–21, 20–22	(silver) Runner-up
2009	Dutch International	(Denmark) Anne Skelbæk	(Germany) Johannes Schöttler (Germany) Birgit Overzier	16–21, 10–21	(silver) Runner-up
2010	Irish International	(Denmark) Britta Andersen	(England) Chris Adcock (Scotland) Imogen Bankier	13–21, 11–21	(silver) Runner-up
2010	Dutch International	(Denmark) Julie Houmann	(Denmark) Anders Skaarup Rasmussen (Denmark) Anne Skelbæk	17–21, 12–21	(silver) Runner-up

BWF International Challenge tournament
BWF International Series tournament
BWF Future Series tournament
