= Mads Pieler Kolding =

Danish badminton player (born 1988)

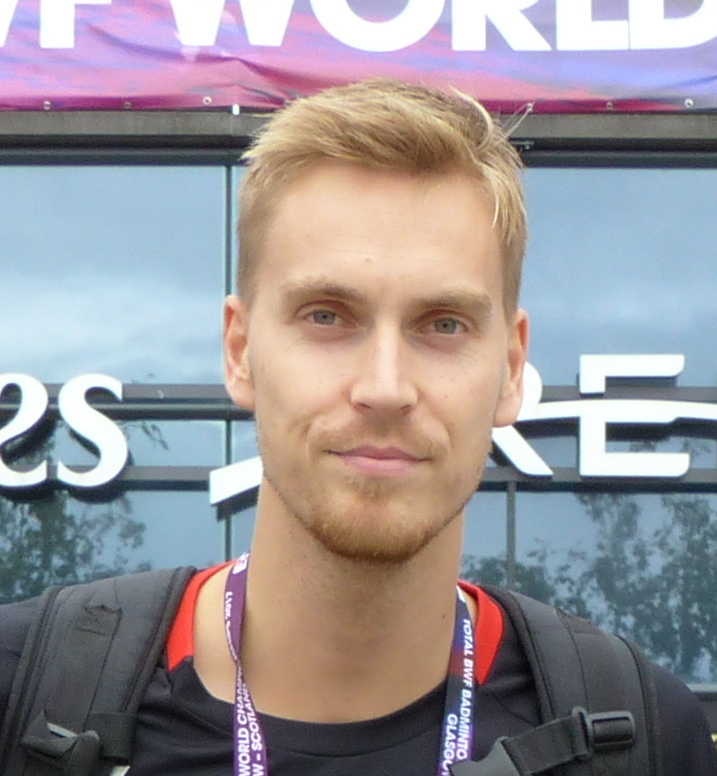
- Kolding at the 2017 World Championships

Personal information
- Born: 27 January 1988 (age 38) Holbæk, Denmark
- Height: 2.05 m (6 ft 9 in)
- Weight: 92 kg (203 lb)

Sport
- Country: Denmark
- Sport: Badminton
- Handedness: Right
- Retired: 4 November 2021

Men's & mixed doubles
- Highest ranking: 4 (MD with Mads Conrad-Petersen 14 May 2018); 9 (XD with Kamilla Rytter Juhl 23 April 2015)
- BWF profile
Medal record
Men's badminton
Representing Denmark
Sudirman Cup
Silver medal – second place	2011 Qingdao	Mixed team
Thomas Cup
Gold medal – first place	2016 Kunshan	Men's team
Bronze medal – third place	2012 Wuhan	Men's team
Bronze medal – third place	2018 Bangkok	Men's team
Bronze medal – third place	2020 Aarhus	Men's team
European Championships
Gold medal – first place	2016 La Roche-sur-Yon	Men's doubles
Silver medal – second place	2012 Karlskrona	Mixed doubles
Silver medal – second place	2014 Kazan	Men's doubles
Silver medal – second place	2014 Kazan	Mixed doubles
Silver medal – second place	2017 Kolding	Men's doubles
Silver medal – second place	2018 Huelva	Men's doubles
European Mixed Team Championships
Gold medal – first place	2015 Leuven	Mixed team
Gold medal – first place	2017 Lubin	Mixed team
Gold medal – first place	2019 Copenhagen	Mixed team
Gold medal – first place	2021 Vantaa	Mixed team
European Men's Team Championships
Gold medal – first place	2014 Basel	Men's team
Gold medal – first place	2016 Kazan	Men's team
Gold medal – first place	2018 Kazan	Men's team
European Junior Championships
Silver medal – second place	2007 Völklingen	Boys' doubles
Bronze medal – third place	2007 Völklingen	Mixed doubles
Bronze medal – third place	2007 Völklingen	Mixed team

Mads Pieler Kolding (born 27 January 1988) is a Danish former badminton player who specializes in doubles. He won the gold medal at the 2016 European Championships in the men's doubles event partnered with Mads Conrad-Petersen. He was also a part of the Denmark national team who won the 2016 Thomas Cup. Kolding announced his retirement from international badminton on 4 November 2021.

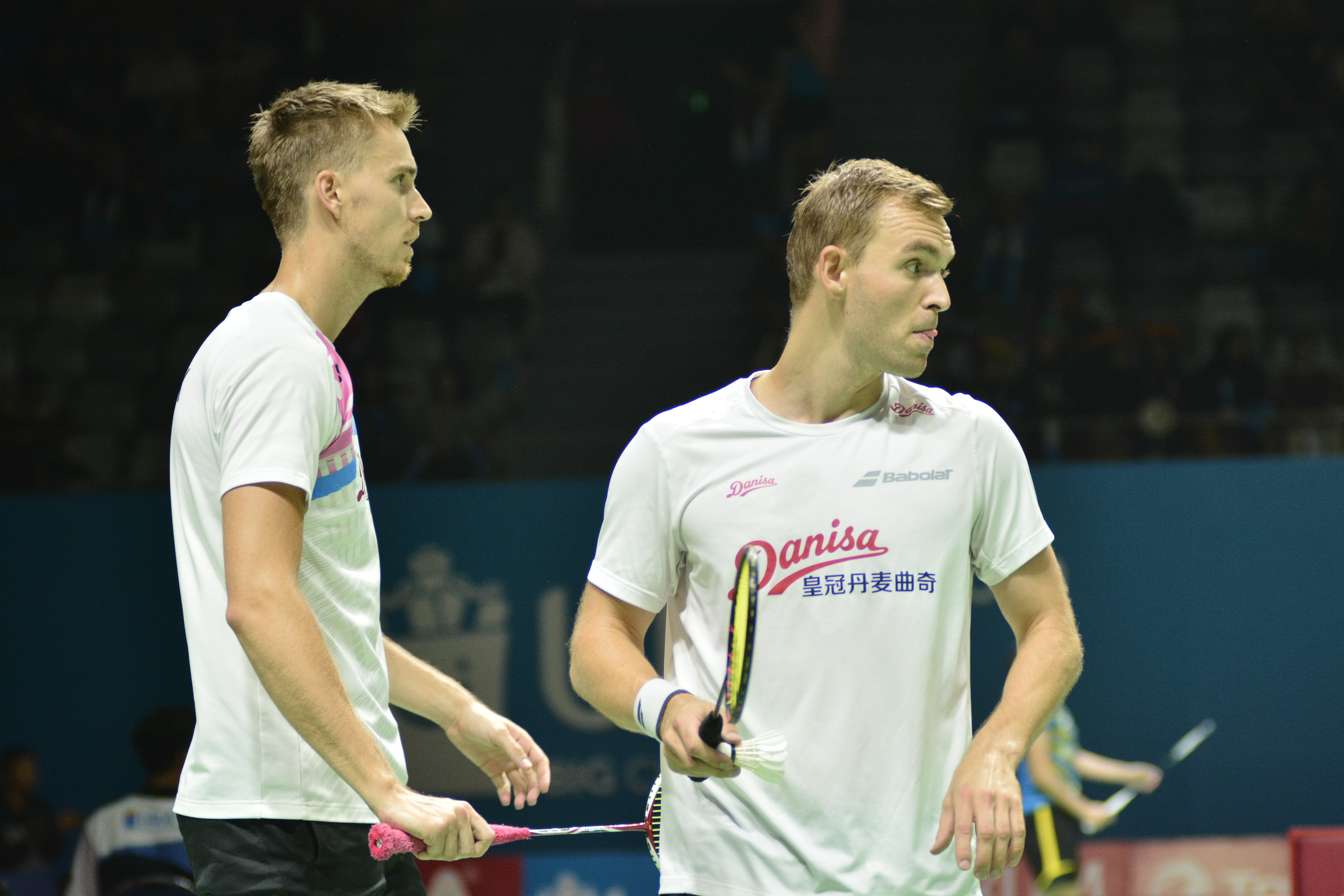
Kolding (left) with his doubles partner Mads Conrad-Petersen at 2019 Indonesia Open

== Achievements ==
=== European Championships ===
Men's doubles
Year	Venue	Partner	Opponent	Score	Result
2014	Gymnastics Center Kazan; Kazan, Russia	(Denmark) Mads Conrad-Petersen	(Russia) Vladimir Ivanov (Russia) Ivan Sozonov	13–21, 16–21	Silver
2016	Vendéspace; La Roche-sur-Yon, France	(Denmark) Mads Conrad-Petersen	(Denmark) Kim Astrup (Denmark) Anders Skaarup Rasmussen	14–21, 21–18, 21–13	Gold
2017	Sydbank Arena; Kolding, Denmark	(Denmark) Mads Conrad-Petersen	(Denmark) Mathias Boe (Denmark) Carsten Mogensen	16–21, 20–22	Silver
2018	Palacio de los Deportes Carolina Marín; Huelva, Spain	(Denmark) Mads Conrad-Petersen	(Denmark) Kim Astrup (Denmark) Anders Skaarup Rasmussen	15–21, retired	Silver

Mixed doubles
Year	Venue	Partner	Opponent	Score	Result
2012	Telenor Arena; Karlskrona, Sweden	(Denmark) Julie Houmann	(Poland) Robert Mateusiak (Poland) Nadieżda Zięba	12–21, 22–24	Silver
2014	Gymnastics Center Kazan; Kazan, Russia	(Denmark) Kamilla Rytter Juhl	(Denmark) Joachim Fischer Nielsen (Denmark) Christinna Pedersen	24–22, 13–21, 18–21	Silver

=== European Junior Championships ===
Boys' doubles
Year	Venue	Partner	Opponent	Score	Result
2007	Hermann-Neuberger-Halle; Völklingen, Germany	(Denmark) Mads Conrad-Petersen	(England) Chris Adcock (England) Peter Mills	16–21, 15–21	Silver

Mixed doubles
Year	Venue	Partner	Opponent	Score	Result
2007	Hermann-Neuberger-Halle; Völklingen, Germany	(Denmark) Line Damkjær Kruse	(Denmark) Christian Larsen (Denmark) Joan Christiansen	13–21, 21–12, 17–21	Bronze

=== BWF Superseries (3 runners-up) ===
The BWF Superseries, which was launched on 14 December 2006 and implemented in 2007, was a series of elite badminton tournaments, sanctioned by the Badminton World Federation (BWF). BWF Superseries levels were Superseries and Superseries Premier. A season of Superseries consisted of twelve tournaments around the world that had been introduced since 2011. Successful players were invited to the Superseries Finals, which were held at the end of each year.

Men's doubles
Year	Tournament	Partner	Opponent	Score	Result
2015	India Open	(Denmark) Mads Conrad-Petersen	(China) Chai Biao (China) Hong Wei	18–21, 14–21	(silver) Runner-up
2015	French Open	(Denmark) Mads Conrad-Petersen	(South Korea) Lee Yong-dae (South Korea) Yoo Yeon-seong	14–21, 19–21	(silver) Runner-up
2017	Hong Kong Open	(Denmark) Mads Conrad-Petersen	(Indonesia) Marcus Fernaldi Gideon (Indonesia) Kevin Sanjaya Sukamuljo	12–21, 18–21	(silver) Runner-up

BWF Super Series Finals tournament
BWF Super Series Premier tournament
BWF Super Series tournament

=== BWF Grand Prix (6 titles, 1 runner-up) ===
The BWF Grand Prix had two levels, the Grand Prix and Grand Prix Gold. It was a series of badminton tournaments sanctioned by the Badminton World Federation (BWF) and played between 2007 and 2017.

Men's doubles
Year	Tournament	Partner	Opponent	Score	Result
2013	Bitburger Open	(Denmark) Mads Conrad-Petersen	(Denmark) Kim Astrup (Denmark) Anders Skaarup Rasmussen	21–11, 21–16	(gold) Winner
2013	Scottish Open	(Denmark) Mads Conrad-Petersen	(Denmark) Kim Astrup (Denmark) Anders Skaarup Rasmussen	Walkover	(gold) Winner
2015	German Open	(Denmark) Mads Conrad-Petersen	(Russia) Vladimir Ivanov (Russia) Ivan Sozonov	22–20, 21–19	(gold) Winner
2015	Bitburger Open	(Denmark) Mads Conrad-Petersen	(Russia) Vladimir Ivanov (Russia) Ivan Sozonov	21–18, 21–18	(gold) Winner
2017	German Open	(Denmark) Mads Conrad-Petersen	(Denmark) Kim Astrup (Denmark) Anders Skaarup Rasmussen	17–21, 13–21	(silver) Runner-up

Mixed doubles
Year	Tournament	Partner	Opponent	Score	Result
2012	Dutch Open	(Denmark) Kamilla Rytter Juhl	(England) Marcus Ellis (England) Gabrielle White	21–15, 21–13	(gold) Winner
2015	German Open	(Denmark) Kamilla Rytter Juhl	(Denmark) Joachim Fischer Nielsen (Denmark) Christinna Pedersen	21–18, 21–17	(gold) Winner

BWF Grand Prix Gold tournament
BWF Grand Prix tournament

=== BWF International Challenge/Series (14 titles, 5 runners-up) ===
Men's doubles
Year	Tournament	Partner	Opponent	Score	Result
2007	Hungarian International	(Denmark) Peter Mørk	(Indonesia) Sartono Ekopranoto (Indonesia) Andi Hartono Tandaputra	21–15, 21–15	(gold) Winner
2007	Hellas International	(Denmark) Mikkel Elbjørn	(Malaysia) Au Kok Leong (Malaysia) Goh Ying Jin	19–21, 18–21	(silver) Runner-up
2009	Scottish International	(Denmark) Mads Conrad-Petersen	(England) Chris Langridge (England) Robin Middleton	19–21, 26–24, 21–16	(gold) Winner
2009	Dutch International	(Denmark) Mads Conrad-Petersen	(Netherlands) Ruud Bosch (Netherlands) Koen Ridder	21–14, 22–20	(gold) Winner
2009	Croatian International	(Denmark) Mads Conrad-Petersen	(Japan) Naoki Kawamae (Japan) Shoji Sato	21–15, 21–19	(gold) Winner
2009	Czech International	(Denmark) Mads Conrad-Petersen	(Denmark) Mikkel Elbjørn (Denmark) Christian John Skovgaard	21–14, 17–21, 21–9	(gold) Winner
2009	Irish International	(Denmark) Mads Conrad-Petersen	(England) Marcus Ellis (England) Peter Mills	21–18, 21–11	(gold) Winner
2010	Dutch International	(Denmark) Mads Conrad-Petersen	(Denmark) Mikkel Elbjørn (Denmark) Christian John Skovgaard	21–17, 21–14	(gold) Winner
2012	Denmark International	(Denmark) Christian John Skovgaard	(Denmark) Kasper Antonsen (Denmark) Rasmus Bonde	21–17, 21–10	(gold) Winner
2021	Portugal International	(Denmark) Frederik Søgaard	(Denmark) Emil Lauritzen (Denmark) Mads Vestergaard	21–17, 21–18	(gold) Winner

Mixed doubles
Year	Tournament	Partner	Opponent	Score	Result
2007	Hungarian International	(Denmark) Line Damkjær Kruse	(China) Zhang Yi (China) Cai Jiani	15–21, 17–21	(silver) Runner-up
2007	Hellas International	(Denmark) Line Damkjær Kruse	(Denmark) Jeppe Lund (Denmark) Louise Hansen	Walkover	(gold) Winner
2008	Finnish International	(Denmark) Line Damkjær Kruse	(Indonesia) Fran Kurniawan (Indonesia) Shendy Puspa Irawati	12–21, 18–21	(silver) Runner-up
2010	Swedish International	(Denmark) Britta Andersen	(Ukraine) Valeriy Atrashchenkov (Ukraine) Elena Prus	18–21, 21–18, 21–17	(gold) Winner
2010	Turkey International	(Denmark) Julie Houmann	(France) Baptiste Carême (France) Laura Choinet	21–12, 21–18	(gold) Winner
2011	Austrian International	(Denmark) Julie Houmann	(Hong Kong) Wong Wai Hong (Hong Kong) Chau Hoi Wah	17–21, 11–21	(silver) Runner-up
2011	Denmark International	(Denmark) Julie Houmann	(Denmark) Rasmus Bonde (Denmark) Maria Helsbøl	21–13, 21–15	(gold) Winner
2012	Swedish Masters	(Denmark) Julie Houmann	(England) Nathan Robertson (England) Jenny Wallwork	17–21, 17–21	(silver) Runner-up
2012	Denmark International	(Denmark) Julie Houmann	(Denmark) Kim Astrup (Denmark) Line Kjærsfeldt	21–19, 21–9	(gold) Winner

BWF International Challenge tournament
BWF International Series tournament
