= Marcus Ellis =

British badminton player (born 1989)

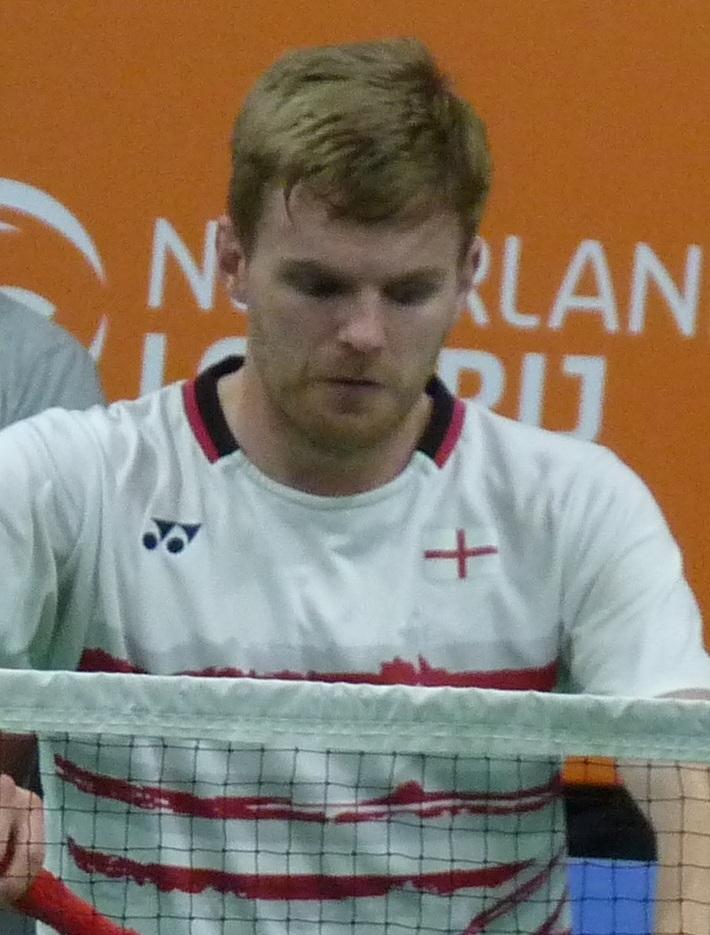
- Ellis at the 2018 Dutch Open

Personal information
- Born: 14 September 1989 (age 37) Huddersfield, England
- Height: 1.75 m (5 ft 9 in)
- Weight: 80 kg (176 lb)

Sport
- Country: England
- Sport: Badminton
- Handedness: Right
- Coached by: Peter Jeffrey

Men's & mixed doubles
- Highest ranking: 11 (MD with Chris Langridge, 4 May 2021); 7 (XD with Lauren Smith, 21 June 2018)
- BWF profile
Medal record
Men's badminton
Representing Great Britain
Olympic Games
| Bronze medal – third place | 2016 Rio de Janeiro | Men's doubles |
European Games
| Gold medal – first place | 2019 Minsk | Men's doubles |
| Gold medal – first place | 2019 Minsk | Mixed doubles |
| Bronze medal – third place | 2023 Kraków–Małopolska | Mixed doubles |
Representing England
Commonwealth Games
| Gold medal – first place | 2018 Gold Coast | Men's doubles |
| Silver medal – second place | 2018 Gold Coast | Mixed doubles |
| Silver medal – second place | 2022 Birmingham | Mixed doubles |
| Bronze medal – third place | 2018 Gold Coast | Mixed team |
European Championships
| Silver medal – second place | 2021 Kyiv | Mixed doubles |
| Bronze medal – third place | 2016 La Roche-sur-Yon | Men's doubles |
| Bronze medal – third place | 2018 Huelva | Mixed doubles |
| Bronze medal – third place | 2021 Kyiv | Men's doubles |
European Mixed Team Championships
| Silver medal – second place | 2015 Leuven | Mixed team |
| Bronze medal – third place | 2013 Moscow | Mixed team |
| Bronze medal – third place | 2017 Lubin | Mixed team |
| Bronze medal – third place | 2023 Aire-sur-la-Lys | Mixed team |
European Men's Team Championships
| Silver medal – second place | 2014 Basel | Men's team |
| Silver medal – second place | 2018 Kazan | Men's team |
| Bronze medal – third place | 2012 Amsterdam | Men's team |
| Bronze medal – third place | 2016 Kazan | Men's team |
European Junior Championships
| Gold medal – first place | 2007 Völklingen | Mixed team |

Marcus Ellis (born 14 September 1989) is a British badminton player. He was the men's doubles champion in the English National Championships. Ellis and Chris Langridge won a bronze medal in the men's doubles at the 2016 Summer Olympics in Rio de Janeiro, also gold medal at the 2018 Commonwealth Games in Gold Coast, Australia. At the 2019 Minsk European Games, Ellis captured two gold medals; in the men's doubles with Langridge and in the mixed doubles event with Lauren Smith.

== Personal life ==
Marcus Ellis, the youngest son of Sheila and John Ellis, was born on 14 September 1989 in Huddersfield, West Yorkshire. He has an elder brother James. Ellis started playing badminton aged seven when his father took him to the Colne Valley Leisure Centre in Slaithwaite.

Ellis was first educated at Clough Head Junior School in Huddersfield, before attending Colne Valley High School, a state comprehensive school in the village of Linthwaite. He attended high school with Alex Smithies, now the goalkeeper for Huddersfield Town Football Club. He then studied for 6 months at Huddersfield New College before deciding to move away from Huddersfield at the age of 17 so he may train at the National Badminton Centre in Milton Keynes.

Ellis lived in St Albans.

== Career ==
In the early years of his professional career, Ellis teamed up with a number of players in the doubles, such as Tom Wolfenden and Peter Mills in the men's doubles, and Gabby Adcock and Mariana Agathangelou in the mixed. He won the men's doubles at the Denmark International in 2013 with Paul van Rietvelde.

In September 2014, he teamed up with Chris Langridge. They won their first men's doubles title in December 2014 in the Italian Open, and their first title in the English National Badminton Championships in February 2015, which they won again in 2016. They also won the Welsh International in 2015. They were defeated in the 2016 European Championships in La Roche-sur-Yon in the semi-finals to gain a bronze. They have also won medals in the European Team Championships – a silver in the Mixed Team in 2015, and a bronze medal in the Men's Team in 2016.

During the 2016 Summer Olympics in Rio, Ellis and Langridge were ranked No. 22 in the world, but they managed to win a bronze, the first medal in badminton men's doubles won by a British team at the Olympics.

In 2017, he won his first Grand Prix tournament title at the Dutch Open in the mixed doubles event with Lauren Smith.

At the 2018 Commonwealth Games held on the Gold Coast, Australia, Ellis captured three medals – he won a gold in the men's doubles with Chris Langridge, which is England's first men's badminton double title at the Games in 40 years; a silver in the mixed doubles with Lauren Smith; and also a bronze in the mixed team event. At the 2018 European Championships held in Huelva, Spain, he finished in the semi-final, and settled for a bronze medal in the mixed doubles event with Smith after lose a match to Danish pair Mathias Christiansen and Christinna Pedersen in the rubber games.

Ellis qualified to represent Great Britain at the 2019 European Games, played in the men's doubles with Chris Langridge and in the mixed doubles with Lauren Smith. Competed as the second seeds in the men's and mixed doubles event, he reached the finals in both events. In the men's doubles, Ellis and Langridge managed to claim the gold medal after beat the top seeds from Denmark Kim Astrup and Anders Skaarup Rasmussen in straight games 21–17, 21–10. He secured his second gold in the mixed doubles with Smith after beat their teammates the top seeds Chris Adcock and Gabby Adcock with the score 21–14, 21–9.

Ellis opened the 2020 season by achieved his biggest triumph as in just his second tournament of the season, he won his first Super 300 event in Thailand Masters partnered with Lauren Smith. He and Smith then reached in to the quarter-finals of Spain Masters and semi finals of All England Open. In October, Ellis and Chris Langridge won the men's doubles title at the 2020 Denmark Open, became the first English men's doubles pair in 45 years to win the Denmark Open.

Ellis competed at the 2021 European Championships in Kyiv, Ukraine, and won a silver medal in the mixed doubles with Smith and a bronze in the men's doubles with Langridge. In July, he and Smith played at the 2020 Summer Olympics, but was eliminated in the quarter-finals.

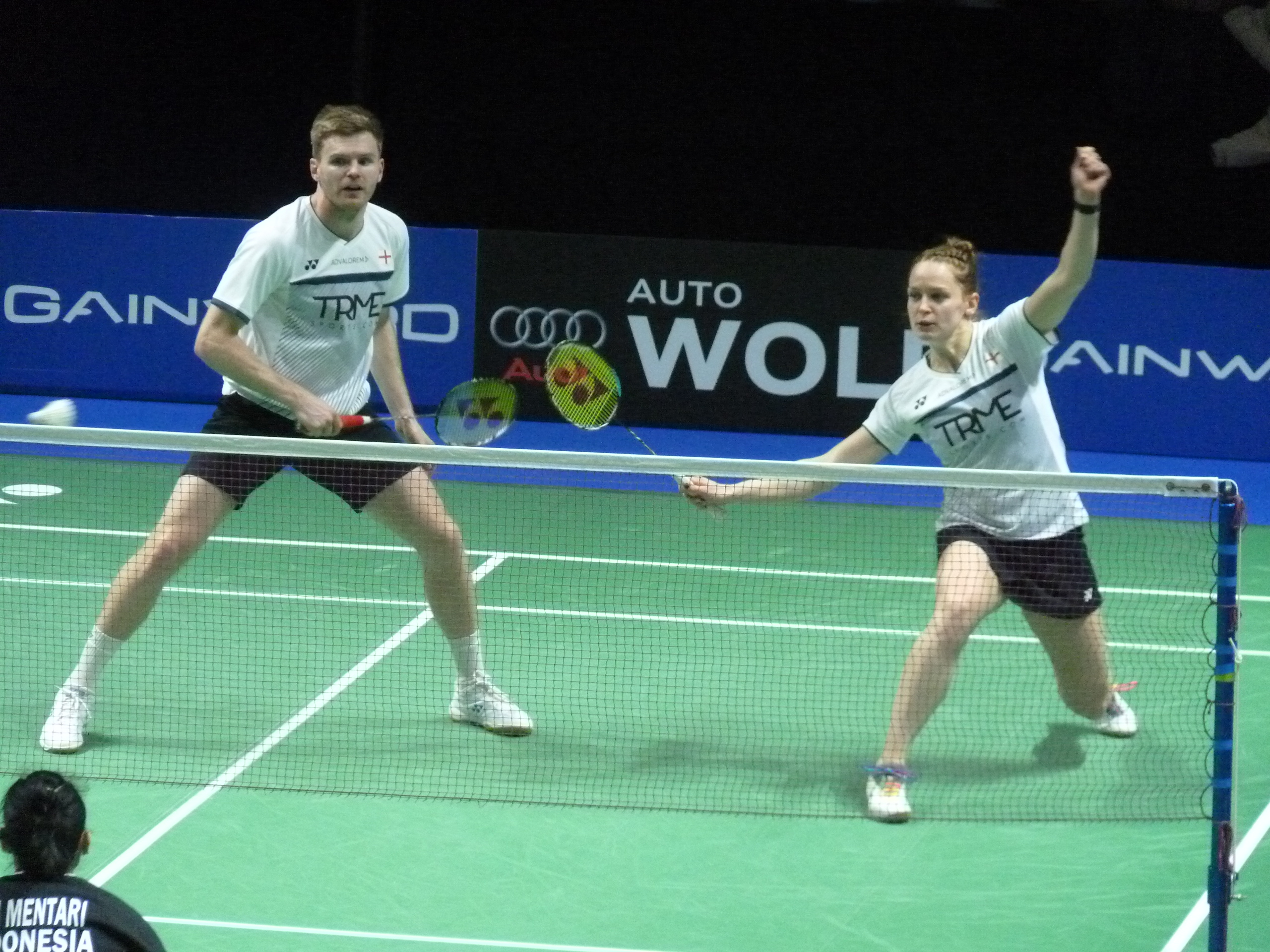
Ellis (left) and Smith at the 2022 German Open

In 2022, Ellis competed at the Commonwealth Games in Birmingham, England as mixed doubles second seed with his partner Lauren Smith. They progressed to the final, but lost to third seeded from Singapore Terry Hee and Jessica Tan, settled for the silver medal. After the Commonwealth Games, Ellis had to withdraw for the next tournament due to a hip injury and planned surgery.

== Achievements ==
=== Olympic Games ===
Men's doubles
| Year | Venue | Partner | Opponent | Score | Result |
|---|---|---|---|---|---|
| 2016 | Riocentro - Pavilion 4, Rio de Janeiro, Brazil | (United Kingdom) Chris Langridge | (China) Chai Biao (China) Hong Wei | 21–18, 19–21, 21–10 | Bronze |

=== Commonwealth Games ===
Men's doubles
| Year | Venue | Partner | Opponent | Score | Result |
|---|---|---|---|---|---|
| 2018 | Carrara Sports and Leisure Centre, Gold Coast, Australia | (England) Chris Langridge | (India) Satwiksairaj Rankireddy (India) Chirag Shetty | 21–13, 21–16 | Gold |

Mixed doubles
| Year | Venue | Partner | Opponent | Score | Result |
|---|---|---|---|---|---|
| 2018 | Carrara Sports and Leisure Centre, Gold Coast, Australia | (England) Lauren Smith | (England) Chris Adcock (England) Gabby Adcock | 21–19, 17–21, 16–21 | Silver |
| 2022 | National Exhibition Centre; Birmingham, England | (England) Lauren Smith | (Singapore) Terry Hee (Singapore) Jessica Tan | 16–21, 15–21 | Silver |

=== European Games ===
Men's doubles
| Year | Venue | Partner | Opponent | Score | Result |
|---|---|---|---|---|---|
| 2019 | Falcon Club; Minsk, Belarus | (United Kingdom) Chris Langridge | (Denmark) Kim Astrup (Denmark) Anders Skaarup Rasmussen | 21–17, 21–10 | Gold |

Mixed doubles
| Year | Venue | Partner | Opponent | Score | Result |
|---|---|---|---|---|---|
| 2019 | Falcon Club; Minsk, Belarus | (United Kingdom) Lauren Smith | (United Kingdom) Chris Adcock (United Kingdom) Gabby Adcock | 21–14, 21–9 | Gold |
| 2023 | Arena Jaskółka; Tarnów, Poland | (United Kingdom) Lauren Smith | (France) Thom Gicquel (France) Delphine Delrue | 18–21, 21–14, 18–21 | Bronze |

=== European Championships ===
Men's doubles
| Year | Venue | Partner | Opponent | Score | Result |
|---|---|---|---|---|---|
| 2016 | Vendéspace, La Roche-sur-Yon, France | (England) Chris Langridge | (Denmark) Mads Conrad-Petersen (Denmark) Mads Pieler Kolding | 19–21, 14–21 | Bronze |
| 2021 | Palace of Sports, Kyiv, Ukraine | (England) Chris Langridge | (Russia) Vladimir Ivanov (Russia) Ivan Sozonov | 15–21, 10–21 | Bronze |

Mixed doubles
| Year | Venue | Partner | Opponent | Score | Result |
|---|---|---|---|---|---|
| 2018 | Palacio de los Deportes Carolina Marín, Huelva, Spain | (England) Lauren Smith | (Denmark) Mathias Christiansen (Denmark) Christinna Pedersen | 16–21, 21–19, 12–21 | Bronze |
| 2021 | Palace of Sports, Kyiv, Ukraine | (England) Lauren Smith | (Russia) Rodion Alimov (Russia) Alina Davletova | 21–11, 16–21, 15–21 | Silver |

=== BWF World Tour (9 titles, 3 runners-up) ===
The BWF World Tour, which was announced on 19 March 2017 and implemented in 2018, is a series of elite badminton tournaments sanctioned by the Badminton World Federation (BWF). The BWF World Tour is divided into levels of World Tour Finals, Super 1000, Super 750, Super 500, Super 300, and the BWF Tour Super 100.

Men's doubles
| Year | Tournament | Level | Partner | Opponent | Score | Result |
|---|---|---|---|---|---|---|
| 2018 | Canada Open | Super 100 | (England) Chris Langridge | (Germany) Mark Lamsfuß (Germany) Marvin Seidel | 19–21, 21–18, 22–20 | (gold) Winner |
| 2018 | SaarLorLux Open | Super 100 | (England) Chris Langridge | (Malaysia) Aaron Chia (Malaysia) Soh Wooi Yik | 21–23, 21–18, 21–19 | (gold) Winner |
| 2018 | Scottish Open | Super 100 | (England) Chris Langridge | (Denmark) David Daugaard (Denmark) Frederik Søgaard | 23–21, 21–16 | (gold) Winner |
| 2020 | Denmark Open | Super 750 | (England) Chris Langridge | (Russia) Vladimir Ivanov (Russia) Ivan Sozonov | 20–22, 21–17, 21–18 | (gold) Winner |

Mixed doubles
| Year | Tournament | Level | Partner | Opponent | Score | Result |
|---|---|---|---|---|---|---|
| 2018 | Swiss Open | Super 300 | (England) Lauren Smith | (Germany) Mark Lamsfuß (Germany) Isabel Herttrich | 20–22, 19–21 | (silver) Runner-up |
| 2018 | Canada Open | Super 100 | (England) Lauren Smith | (Germany) Mark Lamsfuß (Germany) Isabel Herttrich | 21–13, 21–4 | (gold) Winner |
| 2018 | Spain Masters | Super 300 | (England) Lauren Smith | (Denmark) Niclas Nøhr (Denmark) Sara Thygesen | 19–21, 17–21 | (silver) Runner-up |
| 2018 | Dutch Open | Super 100 | (England) Lauren Smith | (France) Thom Gicquel (France) Delphine Delrue | 21–15, 21–15 | (gold) Winner |
| 2018 | SaarLorLux Open | Super 100 | (England) Lauren Smith | (China) Lu Kai (China) Chen Lu | 19–21, 21–18, 21–10 | (gold) Winner |
| 2018 | Scottish Open | Super 100 | (England) Lauren Smith | (Netherlands) Jacco Arends (Netherlands) Selena Piek | 13–6 retired | (gold) Winner |
| 2019 | Syed Modi International | Super 300 | (England) Lauren Smith | (Russia) Rodion Alimov (Russia) Alina Davletova | 18–21, 16–21 | (silver) Runner-up |
| 2020 | Thailand Masters | Super 300 | (England) Lauren Smith | (Indonesia) Hafiz Faizal (Indonesia) Gloria Emanuelle Widjaja | 21–16, 13–21, 21–16 | (gold) Winner |

=== BWF Grand Prix (1 title, 1 runner-up) ===
The BWF Grand Prix had two levels, the Grand Prix and Grand Prix Gold. It was a series of badminton tournaments sanctioned by the Badminton World Federation (BWF) and played between 2007 and 2017.

Mixed doubles
| Year | Tournament | Partner | Opponent | Score | Result |
|---|---|---|---|---|---|
| 2012 | Dutch Open | (England) Gabrielle White | (Denmark) Mads Pieler Kolding (Denmark) Kamilla Rytter Juhl | 15–21, 13–21 | (silver) Runner-up |
| 2017 | Dutch Open | (England) Lauren Smith | (Netherlands) Jacco Arends (Netherlands) Selena Piek | 21–17, 21–18 | (gold) Winner |

BWF Grand Prix Gold tournament
BWF Grand Prix tournament

=== BWF International Challenge/Series (17 titles, 14 runners-up) ===
Men's doubles
| Year | Tournament | Partner | Opponent | Score | Result |
|---|---|---|---|---|---|
| 2009 | Belgian International | (England) Peter Mills | (Netherlands) Ruud Bosch (Netherlands) Koen Ridder | 28–30, 12–21 | (silver) Runner-up |
| 2009 | Irish International | (England) Peter Mills | (Denmark) Mads Conrad-Petersen (Denmark) Mads Pieler Kolding | 18–21, 11–21 | (silver) Runner-up |
| 2010 | Czech International | (England) Peter Mills | (England) Chris Langridge (England) Robin Middleton | 9–21, 19–21 | (silver) Runner-up |
| 2010 | Bulgarian International | (England) Peter Mills | (Scotland) Martin Campbell (Scotland) Angus Gilmour | 21–14, 21–10 | (gold) Winner |
| 2010 | Norwegian International | (England) Peter Mills | (Germany) Ingo Kindervater (Germany) Johannes Schöttler | 17–21, 21–23 | (silver) Runner-up |
| 2010 | Scottish International | (England) Peter Mills | (England) Chris Adcock (England) Andrew Ellis | 21–19, 11–21, 21–15 | (gold) Winner |
| 2011 | Scottish International | (England) Peter Mills | (Russia) Vladimir Ivanov (Russia) Ivan Sozonov | 19–21, 19–21 | (silver) Runner-up |
| 2011 | Irish International | (England) Peter Mills | (Poland) Adam Cwalina (Poland) Michał Łogosz | 15–21, 15–21 | (silver) Runner-up |
| 2012 | Portugal International | (Scotland) Paul van Rietvelde | (Croatia) Zvonimir Đurkinjak (Denmark) Nikolaj Overgaard | 12–21, 20–22 | (silver) Runner-up |
| 2012 | Belgian International | (Scotland) Paul van Rietvelde | (Poland) Adam Cwalina (Netherlands) Koen Ridder | 18–21, 17–21 | (silver) Runner-up |
| 2012 | Welsh International | (Scotland) Paul van Rietvelde | (England) Peter Briggs (England) Harley Towler | 16–21, 21–9, 21–16 | (gold) Winner |
| 2013 | Italian International | (Scotland) Paul van Rietvelde | (Denmark) Kim Astrup (Denmark) Anders Skaarup Rasmussen | 25–23, 16–21, 21–19 | (gold) Winner |
| 2014 | Italian International | (England) Chris Langridge | (Germany) Michael Fuchs (Germany) Johannes Schöttler | 21–11, 21–19 | (gold) Winner |
| 2015 | White Nights | (England) Chris Langridge | (Malaysia) Koo Kien Keat (Malaysia) Tan Boon Heong | 10–21, 12–21 | (silver) Runner-up |
| 2015 | Welsh International | (England) Chris Langridge | (Poland) Adam Cwalina (Poland) Przemysław Wacha | 21–16, 16–21, 21–16 | (gold) Winner |
| 2016 | Austrian Open | (England) Chris Langridge | (Japan) Kenya Mitsuhashi (Japan) Yuta Watanabe | 21–14, 21–16 | (gold) Winner |
| 2017 | Yonex / K&D Graphics International | (England) Chris Langridge | (Chinese Taipei) Lu Chia-hung (Chinese Taipei) Lu Chia-pin | 21–14, 21–17 | (gold) Winner |
| 2019 | Azerbaijan International | (England) Chris Langridge | (Germany) Mark Lamsfuß (Germany) Marvin Seidel | 17–21, 21–23 | (silver) Runner-up |
| 2019 | Kharkiv International | (England) Chris Langridge | (England) Ben Lane (England) Sean Vendy | 19–21, 18–21 | (silver) Runner-up |

Mixed doubles
| Year | Tournament | Partner | Opponent | Score | Result |
|---|---|---|---|---|---|
| 2009 | Norwegian International | (England) Heather Olver | (England) Robin Middleton (England) Mariana Agathangelou | 21–19, 21–17 | (gold) Winner |
| 2009 | Belgian International | (England) Heather Olver | (Belgium) Wouter Claes (Belgium) Nathalie Descamps | 21–9, 25–23 | (gold) Winner |
| 2011 | Irish International | (England) Heather Olver | (Netherlands) Dave Khodabux (Netherlands) Selena Piek | 21–19, 21–17 | (gold) Winner |
| 2012 | Portugal International | (England) Gabrielle White | (Croatia) Zvonimir Đurkinjak (Croatia) Staša Poznanović | 21–17, 15–21, 24–22 | (gold) Winner |
| 2012 | Spanish Open | (England) Gabrielle White | (France) Ronan Labar (France) Émilie Lefel | 21–9, 21–13 | (gold) Winner |
| 2012 | Belgian International | (England) Gabrielle White | (England) Chris Langridge (England) Heather Olver | 9–21, 21–10, 21–17 | (gold) Winner |
| 2012 | Czech International | (England) Gabrielle White | (England) Chris Langridge (England) Heather Olver | 20–22, 7–6 retired | (silver) Runner-up |
| 2012 | Scottish International | (England) Gabrielle White | (Netherlands) Ruud Bosch (Netherlands) Selena Piek | 21–16, 21–16 | (gold) Winner |
| 2012 | Welsh International | (England) Gabrielle White | (England) Chris Langridge (England) Heather Olver | 22–20, 21–16 | (gold) Winner |
| 2013 | French International | (England) Alyssa Lim | (Scotland) Robert Blair (Scotland) Imogen Bankier | 17–21, 17–21 | (silver) Runner-up |
| 2017 | Italian International | (England) Lauren Smith | (England) Ben Lane (England) Jessica Pugh | 21–16, 19–21, 4–21 | (silver) Runner-up |
| 2023 | Belgian International | (England) Lauren Smith | (Denmark) Mikkel Mikkelsen (Denmark) Rikke Søby Hansen | 21–18, 21–15 | (gold) Winner |

BWF International Challenge tournament
BWF International Series tournament
BWF Future Series tournament
