= 2016 BWF season =

2016 BWF Season
Details
- Duration: 14 January – 22 December
- Edition: 77th

Achievements (singles)

Awards
- Player of the year: (Malaysia) Lee Chong Wei (Male) (Japan) Misaki Matsutomo & (Japan) Ayaka Takahashi (Female)

The 2016 BWF season was the overall badminton circuit organized by the Badminton World Federation (BWF) for the 2017 badminton season to publish and promote the sport. Besides the BWF World Championships, BWF promoted the sport of badminton through an extensive worldwide program of events. These events had various purposes according to their level and territory in which they were held but those events owned by BWF seek to showcase the sport via the widest possible quality television broadcast and build the fanbase of the sport throughout the world.

The world badminton tournament structure had four levels: Level 1 (BWF Major Events), Level 2 (BWF Superseries: Superseries and Superseries Premier), Level 3 (BWF Grand Prix: Grand Prix and Grand Prix Gold Series), and Level 4 (BWF International Challenge, BWF International Series, and BWF Future Series). The Thomas Cup & Uber Cup, Sudirman Cup and Suhandinata Cup are Teams Events. The others – Superseries, Grand Prix Events, International Challenge, International Series, and Future Series were all individual tournaments. The higher the level of tournament, the larger the prize money and the more ranking points available.

The 2016 BWF Season calendar comprised these four levels of BWF tournaments.

== Schedule ==
This is the complete schedule of events on the 2016 calendar, with the Champions and Runners-up documented.

Key

World Championships
Superseries Finals
Superseries Premier
Superseries
Grand Prix Gold
Grand Prix
International Challenge
International Series
Future Series
Team events

=== January ===
Week of	Tournament	Champions	Runners-up
January 11	Estonian International; Tallinn, Estonia; International Series $5,000 – 32MS/32WS/32MD/32WD/32XD	(Finland) Ville Lång; 21–17, 21–19	(France) Lucas Claerbout
January 11	Estonian International; Tallinn, Estonia; International Series $5,000 – 32MS/32WS/32MD/32WD/32XD	(Belgium) Lianne Tan; 21–19, 21–14	(Ukraine) Marija Ulitina
January 11	Estonian International; Tallinn, Estonia; International Series $5,000 – 32MS/32WS/32MD/32WD/32XD	(Germany) Jones Ralfy Jansen (Germany) Josche Zurwonne; 21–15, 21–18	(Scotland) Martin Campbell (Scotland) Patrick MacHugh
January 11	Estonian International; Tallinn, Estonia; International Series $5,000 – 32MS/32WS/32MD/32WD/32XD	(Russia) Anastasia Chervyakova (Russia) Olga Morozova; 21–14, 21–15	(Estonia) Kristin Kuuba (Estonia) Helina Rüütel
January 11	Estonian International; Tallinn, Estonia; International Series $5,000 – 32MS/32WS/32MD/32WD/32XD	(Russia) Alexandr Zinchenko (Russia) Olga Morozova; 21–18, 21–18	(France) Bastian Kersaudy (France) Léa Palermo
January 18	Malaysia Masters; Penang, Malaysia; Grand Prix Gold $120,000 – 64MS/32WS/32MD/32WD/32XD; Draw|	(Malaysia) Lee Chong Wei; 21–18, 21–11	(Malaysia) Iskandar Zulkarnain Zainuddin
January 18	Malaysia Masters; Penang, Malaysia; Grand Prix Gold $120,000 – 64MS/32WS/32MD/32WD/32XD; Draw|	(India) P. V. Sindhu; 21–15, 21–9	(Scotland) Kirsty Gilmour
January 18	Malaysia Masters; Penang, Malaysia; Grand Prix Gold $120,000 – 64MS/32WS/32MD/32WD/32XD; Draw|	(Indonesia) Markus Fernaldi Gideon (Indonesia) Kevin Sanjaya Sukamuljo; 18–21, 21–13, 21–18	(Malaysia) Koo Kien Keat (Malaysia) Tan Boon Heong
January 18	Malaysia Masters; Penang, Malaysia; Grand Prix Gold $120,000 – 64MS/32WS/32MD/32WD/32XD; Draw|	(Japan) Misaki Matsutomo (Japan) Ayaka Takahashi; 21–18, 22–20	(China) Tang Yuanting (China) Yu Yang
January 18	Malaysia Masters; Penang, Malaysia; Grand Prix Gold $120,000 – 64MS/32WS/32MD/32WD/32XD; Draw|	(China) Zheng Siwei (China) Li Yinhui; 21–14, 21–19	(Malaysia) Tan Kian Meng (Malaysia) Lai Pei Jing
January 18	China International; Lingshui, China; International Challenge $50,000 – 32MS/32WS/32MD/32WD/32XD; Draw	(China) Lin Guipu; 21–7, 22–20	(China) Zhao Junpeng
January 18	China International; Lingshui, China; International Challenge $50,000 – 32MS/32WS/32MD/32WD/32XD; Draw	(China) Hui Xirui; 21–11, 19–21, 21–17	(China) Gao Fangjie
January 18	China International; Lingshui, China; International Challenge $50,000 – 32MS/32WS/32MD/32WD/32XD; Draw	(China) Wang Yilyu (China) Zhang Wen; 21–9, 21–15	(China) Wang Sijie (China) Zhu Junhao
January 18	China International; Lingshui, China; International Challenge $50,000 – 32MS/32WS/32MD/32WD/32XD; Draw	(China) Chen Qingchen (China) Jia Yifan; 21–8, 21–10	(China) Hu Yuxiang (China) Xu Ya
January 18	China International; Lingshui, China; International Challenge $50,000 – 32MS/32WS/32MD/32WD/32XD; Draw	(China) Wang Sijie (China) Chen Lu; 21–18, 18–21, 21–17	(China) Zhou Haodong (China) Jia Yifan
January 18	Swedish Masters; Uppsala, Sweden; International Challenge $17,500 – 32MS/32WS/32MD/32WD/32XD; Draw	(Denmark) Anders Antonsen; 21–12, 21–10	(Sweden) Mattias Borg
January 18	Swedish Masters; Uppsala, Sweden; International Challenge $17,500 – 32MS/32WS/32MD/32WD/32XD; Draw	(Germany) Karin Schnaase; 21–16, 20–22, 21–19	(Germany) Olga Konon
January 18	Swedish Masters; Uppsala, Sweden; International Challenge $17,500 – 32MS/32WS/32MD/32WD/32XD; Draw	(Denmark) Mathias Christiansen (Denmark) David Daugaard; 21–19, 21–23, 21–19	(Denmark) Kim Astrup Sorensen (Denmark) Anders Skaarup Rasmussen
January 18	Swedish Masters; Uppsala, Sweden; International Challenge $17,500 – 32MS/32WS/32MD/32WD/32XD; Draw	(Denmark) Maiken Fruergaard (Denmark) Sara Thygesen; 21–19, 21–17	(Netherlands) Samantha Barning (Netherlands) Iris Tabeling
January 18	Swedish Masters; Uppsala, Sweden; International Challenge $17,500 – 32MS/32WS/32MD/32WD/32XD; Draw	(Poland) Robert Mateusiak (Poland) Nadiezda Zieba; 21–10, 21–13	(Denmark) Mathias Christiansen (Denmark) Lena Grebak
January 25	Syed Modi International; Lucknow, India; Grand Prix Gold $120,000 – 64MS/32WS/32MD/32WD/32XD; Draw|	(India) Srikanth Kidambi; 21–13, 14–21, 21–14	(China) Huang Yuxiang
January 25	Syed Modi International; Lucknow, India; Grand Prix Gold $120,000 – 64MS/32WS/32MD/32WD/32XD; Draw|	(South Korea) Sung Ji-hyun; 12–21, 21–18, 21–18	(Japan) Sayaka Sato
January 25	Syed Modi International; Lucknow, India; Grand Prix Gold $120,000 – 64MS/32WS/32MD/32WD/32XD; Draw|	(Malaysia) Goh V Shem (Malaysia) Tan Wee Kiong; 14–21, 24–22, 21–8	(India) Pranaav Jerry Chopra (India) Akshay Dewalkar
January 25	Syed Modi International; Lucknow, India; Grand Prix Gold $120,000 – 64MS/32WS/32MD/32WD/32XD; Draw|	(South Korea) Jung Kyung-eun (South Korea) Shin Seung-chan; 21–15, 21–13	(Netherlands) Eefje Muskens (Netherlands) Selena Piek
January 25	Syed Modi International; Lucknow, India; Grand Prix Gold $120,000 – 64MS/32WS/32MD/32WD/32XD; Draw|	(Indonesia) Praveen Jordan (Indonesia) Debby Susanto; 23–25, 21–9, 21–16	(Thailand) Dechapol Puavaranukroh (Thailand) Sapsiree Taerattanachai
January 25	Iceland International; Reykjavík, Iceland; International Series $6,000 – 32MS/32WS/32MD/32WD/32XD; Draw|	(Denmark) Kim Bruun; 10–21, 21–14, 21–16	(Portugal) Pedro Martins
January 25	Iceland International; Reykjavík, Iceland; International Series $6,000 – 32MS/32WS/32MD/32WD/32XD; Draw|	(Denmark) Julie Dawall Jakobsen; 19–21, 21–15, 21–16	(Finland) Airi Mikkelä
January 25	Iceland International; Reykjavík, Iceland; International Series $6,000 – 32MS/32WS/32MD/32WD/32XD; Draw|	(England) Christopher Coles (Scotland) Adam Hall; 21–19, 21–19	(England) Ben Lane (England) Sean Vendy
January 25	Iceland International; Reykjavík, Iceland; International Series $6,000 – 32MS/32WS/32MD/32WD/32XD; Draw|	(England) Jessica Pugh (England) Sarah Walker; 21–10, 10–21, 21–17	(England) Chloe Birch (England) Jenny Wallwork
January 25	Iceland International; Reykjavík, Iceland; International Series $6,000 – 32MS/32WS/32MD/32WD/32XD; Draw|	(Finland) Anton Kaisti (Netherlands) Cheryl Seinen; 22–20, 21–18	(Poland) Pawel Pietryja (Poland) Aneta Wojtkowska

=== February ===
Week of	Tournament	Champions	Runners-up
February 1	Manhattan Beach International; Manhattan Beach, USA; International Series $5,000 – 64MS/16WS/16MD/4WD/16XD; Draw	(Italy) Indra Bagus Ade Chandra; 21–19, 21–12	(Mexico) Job Castillo
February 1	Manhattan Beach International; Manhattan Beach, USA; International Series $5,000 – 64MS/16WS/16MD/4WD/16XD; Draw	(Italy) Jeanine Cicognini; 22–20, 21–9	(Mexico) Haramara Gaitan
February 1	Manhattan Beach International; Manhattan Beach, USA; International Series $5,000 – 64MS/16WS/16MD/4WD/16XD; Draw	(Indonesia) David Yedija Pohan (Indonesia) Ricky Alverino Sidarta; 21–17, 21–14	(United States) Mathew Fogarty (United States) Bjorn Seguin
February 1	Manhattan Beach International; Manhattan Beach, USA; International Series $5,000 – 64MS/16WS/16MD/4WD/16XD; Draw	(Mexico) Nicole Marquez (Mexico) Adelina Quiñones; 21–12, 21–12	(United States) Mia Tsao (United States) Lulu Yu
February 1	Manhattan Beach International; Manhattan Beach, USA; International Series $5,000 – 64MS/16WS/16MD/4WD/16XD; Draw	(Indonesia) David Yedija Pohan (Indonesia) Jenna Gozali; 21–15, 21–13	(United States) Tony Gunawan (United States) Mirabelle Huang
February 8	Thailand Masters; Bangkok, Thailand; Grand Prix Gold $120,000 – 64MS/32WS/32MD/32WD/32XD; Draw	(South Korea) Lee Hyun-il; 21–18, 21–19	(Hong Kong) Hu Yun
February 8	Thailand Masters; Bangkok, Thailand; Grand Prix Gold $120,000 – 64MS/32WS/32MD/32WD/32XD; Draw	(Thailand) Ratchanok Intanon; 21–19, 18–21, 21–17	(China) Sun Yu
February 8	Thailand Masters; Bangkok, Thailand; Grand Prix Gold $120,000 – 64MS/32WS/32MD/32WD/32XD; Draw	(Indonesia) Mohammad Ahsan (Indonesia) Hendra Setiawan; 12–21, 21–15, 21–12	(South Korea) Kim Gi-jung (South Korea) Kim Sa-rang
February 8	Thailand Masters; Bangkok, Thailand; Grand Prix Gold $120,000 – 64MS/32WS/32MD/32WD/32XD; Draw	(China) Tian Qing (China) Zhao Yunlei; 11–21, 21–12, 23–21	(China) Tang Yuanting (China) Yu Yang
February 8	Thailand Masters; Bangkok, Thailand; Grand Prix Gold $120,000 – 64MS/32WS/32MD/32WD/32XD; Draw	(China) Zheng Siwei (China) Chen Qingchen; 21–17, 21–15	(Malaysia) Chan Peng Soon (Malaysia) Goh Liu Ying
February 8	Rose Hill International; Rose Hill, Mauritius; Future Series; 32MS/32WS/32MD/32WD/32XD; Draw	(Mauritius) Aatish Lubah; 21–10, 21–17	(Mauritius) Julien Paul
February 8	Rose Hill International; Rose Hill, Mauritius; Future Series; 32MS/32WS/32MD/32WD/32XD; Draw	(Uganda) Bridget Shamim Bangi; 21–7, 20–22, 21–15	(South Africa) Johanita Scholtz
February 8	Rose Hill International; Rose Hill, Mauritius; Future Series; 32MS/32WS/32MD/32WD/32XD; Draw	(South Africa) Andries Malan (South Africa) Willem Viljoen; 21–18, 21–18	(Algeria) Mohamed Abderrahime Belarbi (Algeria) Adel Hamek
February 8	Rose Hill International; Rose Hill, Mauritius; Future Series; 32MS/32WS/32MD/32WD/32XD; Draw	(Uganda) Gloria Najjuka (Uganda) Daisy Nakalyango; 21–18, 21–18	(Zambia) Evelyn Siamupangila (Zambia) Ogar Siamupangila
February 8	Rose Hill International; Rose Hill, Mauritius; Future Series; 32MS/32WS/32MD/32WD/32XD; Draw	(Mauritius) Sahir Edoo (Mauritius) Yeldy Louison; 21–18, 27–29, 26–24	(Ghana) Emmanuel Donkor (Ghana) Gifty Mensah
February 15	Pan Am Team Continental Championships; Guadalajara, Mexico; CC Team Championships; 12 teams (RR); Draw	Mexico; 3–0	Canada
February 15	Pan Am Team Continental Championships; Guadalajara, Mexico; CC Team Championships; 12 teams (RR); Draw	United States; 3–2	Canada
February 15	Badminton Asia Team Championships; Hyderabad, India; CC Team Championships; 14 teams (M)/12 teams (W); Draw	Indonesia; 3–2	Japan
February 15	Badminton Asia Team Championships; Hyderabad, India; CC Team Championships; 14 teams (M)/12 teams (W); Draw	China; 3–2	Japan
February 15	Africa Continental Team Badminton Championships; Rose Hill, Mauritius; CC Team Championships; 7 teams (M)/6 teams (W); Draw	South Africa; 3–1	Mauritius
February 15	Africa Continental Team Badminton Championships; Rose Hill, Mauritius; CC Team Championships; 7 teams (M)/6 teams (W); Draw	Mauritius; 3–0	Egypt
February 15	Oceania Mixed Team Badminton Championships; Auckland, New Zealand; CC Team Championships; 6 teams (RR); Draw	Australia; 3–2	New Zealand
February 15	European Men's and Women's Team Badminton Championships; Kazan, Russia; CC Team Championships; 25 teams (M)/20 teams (W); Draw	Denmark; 3–1	France
February 15	European Men's and Women's Team Badminton Championships; Kazan, Russia; CC Team Championships; 25 teams (M)/20 teams (W); Draw	Denmark; 3–1	Bulgaria
February 15	Oceania Men's and Women's Team Badminton Championships; Auckland, New Zealand; CC Team Championships; 4 teams (M)/5 teams (W); Draw	New Zealand	Australia
February 15	Oceania Men's and Women's Team Badminton Championships; Auckland, New Zealand; CC Team Championships; 4 teams (M)/5 teams (W); Draw	Australia	New Zealand
February 22	Austrian Open; Vienna, Austria; International Challenge $17,500 – 64MS/32WS/32MD/32WD/32XD; Draw	(Denmark) Anders Antonsen; 21–9, 21–17	(Japan) Kanta Tsuneyama
February 22	Austrian Open; Vienna, Austria; International Challenge $17,500 – 64MS/32WS/32MD/32WD/32XD; Draw	(China) Xu Wei; 22–20, 21–15	(Germany) Olga Konon
February 22	Austrian Open; Vienna, Austria; International Challenge $17,500 – 64MS/32WS/32MD/32WD/32XD; Draw	(England) Marcus Ellis (England) Chris Langridge; 21–14, 21–16	(Japan) Kenya Mitsuhashi (Japan) Yuta Watanabe
February 22	Austrian Open; Vienna, Austria; International Challenge $17,500 – 64MS/32WS/32MD/32WD/32XD; Draw	(Russia) Ekaterina Bolotova (Russia) Evgeniya Kosetskaya; 21–11, 23–21	(United States) Eva Lee (United States) Paula Lynn Obanana
February 22	Austrian Open; Vienna, Austria; International Challenge $17,500 – 64MS/32WS/32MD/32WD/32XD; Draw	(Denmark) Mathias Christiansen (Denmark) Lena Grebak; 21–17, 21–17	(England) Matthew Nottingham (England) Emily Westwood
February 22	Guatemala International; Guatemala City, Guatemala; International Series $6,000 – 32MS/32WS/32MD/32WD/32XD; Draw	(Cuba) Osleni Guerrero; Walkover	(Guatemala) Kevin Cordón
February 22	Guatemala International; Guatemala City, Guatemala; International Series $6,000 – 32MS/32WS/32MD/32WD/32XD; Draw	(Brazil) Lohaynny Vicente; 21–16, 14–21, 21–16	(Brazil) Fabiana Silva
February 22	Guatemala International; Guatemala City, Guatemala; International Series $6,000 – 32MS/32WS/32MD/32WD/32XD; Draw	(India) Alwin Francis (India) Tarun Kona; 21–8, 21–14	(Mexico) Job Castillo (Mexico) Lino Muñoz
February 22	Guatemala International; Guatemala City, Guatemala; International Series $6,000 – 32MS/32WS/32MD/32WD/32XD; Draw	(Guatemala) Mariana Paiz (Guatemala) Nikté Sotomayor; 21–18, 21–14	(Guatemala) Michele Barrios (Guatemala) Kareen Morales
February 22	Guatemala International; Guatemala City, Guatemala; International Series $6,000 – 32MS/32WS/32MD/32WD/32XD; Draw	(Guatemala) Jonathan Solís (Guatemala) Nikté Sotomayor; 21–8, 21–14	(United States) Bjorn Seguin (Mexico) Mariana Ugalde
February 22	Uganda International; Kampala, Uganda; International Series $6,000 – 32MS/32WS/32MD/32WD/32XD; Draw	(Sri Lanka) Niluka Karunaratne; 21–17, 21–15	(Portugal) Pedro Martins
February 22	Uganda International; Kampala, Uganda; International Series $6,000 – 32MS/32WS/32MD/32WD/32XD; Draw	(Portugal) Telma Santos; 21–10, 21–12	(Mauritius) Kate Foo Kune
February 22	Uganda International; Kampala, Uganda; International Series $6,000 – 32MS/32WS/32MD/32WD/32XD; Draw	(Sri Lanka) Dinuka Karunaratna (Sri Lanka) Niluka Karunaratne; 21–17, 21–17	(Egypt) Ali Ahmed El-Khateeb (Egypt) Abdelrahman Kashkal
February 22	Uganda International; Kampala, Uganda; International Series $6,000 – 32MS/32WS/32MD/32WD/32XD; Draw	(Turkey) Cemre Fere (Turkey) Ebru Yazgan; 21–16, 21–17	(Nigeria) Grace Gabriel (Zambia) Ogar Siamupangila
February 22	Uganda International; Kampala, Uganda; International Series $6,000 – 32MS/32WS/32MD/32WD/32XD; Draw	(Egypt) Abdelrahman Kashkal (Egypt) Hadia Hosny; 21–16, 16–21, 21–11	(Jordan) Mohd Naser Mansour Nayef (Jordan) Mazahreh Leina Fehmi
February 29	German Open; Mülheim, Germany; Grand Prix Gold $120,000 – 64MS/32WS/32MD/32WD/32XD; Draw	(China) Lin Dan; 15–21, 21–17, 21–17	(Chinese Taipei) Chou Tien-chen
February 29	German Open; Mülheim, Germany; Grand Prix Gold $120,000 – 64MS/32WS/32MD/32WD/32XD; Draw	(China) Li Xuerui; 21–14, 21–17	(China) Wang Shixian
February 29	German Open; Mülheim, Germany; Grand Prix Gold $120,000 – 64MS/32WS/32MD/32WD/32XD; Draw	(South Korea) Ko Sung-hyun (South Korea) Shin Baek-cheol; 20–22, 21–18, 21–17	(South Korea) Lee Yong-dae (South Korea) Yoo Yeon-seong
February 29	German Open; Mülheim, Germany; Grand Prix Gold $120,000 – 64MS/32WS/32MD/32WD/32XD; Draw	(China) Huang Yaqiong (China) Tang Jinhua; 21–14, 21–18	(Thailand) Puttita Supajirakul (Thailand) Sapsiree Taerattanachai
February 29	German Open; Mülheim, Germany; Grand Prix Gold $120,000 – 64MS/32WS/32MD/32WD/32XD; Draw	(South Korea) Ko Sung-hyun (South Korea) Kim Ha-na; 21–19, 21–12	(South Korea) Shin Baek-cheol (South Korea) Chae Yoo-jung
February 29	Peru International Series; Lima, Peru; International Series $6,000 – 32MS/32WS/32MD/32WD/32XD; Draw	(Japan) Yusuke Onodera; 21–9, 21–10	(Italy) Indra Bagus Ade Chandra
February 29	Peru International Series; Lima, Peru; International Series $6,000 – 32MS/32WS/32MD/32WD/32XD; Draw	(Finland) Airi Mikkelä; 21–13, 21–17	(Finland) Nanna Vainio
February 29	Peru International Series; Lima, Peru; International Series $6,000 – 32MS/32WS/32MD/32WD/32XD; Draw	(India) Alwin Francis (India) Tarun Kona; 21–8, 21–12	(Mexico) Job Castillo (Mexico) Lino Muñoz
February 29	Peru International Series; Lima, Peru; International Series $6,000 – 32MS/32WS/32MD/32WD/32XD; Draw	(Japan) Chisato Hoshi (Japan) Naru Shinoya; 21–5, 21–7	(Turkey) Cemre Fere (Turkey) Ebru Yazgan
February 29	Peru International Series; Lima, Peru; International Series $6,000 – 32MS/32WS/32MD/32WD/32XD; Draw	(Peru) Mario Cuba (Peru) Katherine Winder; 23–21, 21–12	(Peru) Diego Mini (Peru) Luz María Zornoza

=== March ===
Week of	Tournament	Champions	Runners-up
March 7	All England Open; Birmingham, England; Superseries Premier $550,000 – 32MS/32WS/32MD/32WD/32XD; Draw	(China) Lin Dan; 21–9, 21–10	(China) Tian Houwei
March 7	All England Open; Birmingham, England; Superseries Premier $550,000 – 32MS/32WS/32MD/32WD/32XD; Draw	(Japan) Nozomi Okuhara; 21–11, 16–21, 21–19	(China) Wang Shixian
March 7	All England Open; Birmingham, England; Superseries Premier $550,000 – 32MS/32WS/32MD/32WD/32XD; Draw	(Russia) Vladimir Ivanov (Russia) Ivan Sozonov; 21–23, 21–18, 21–16	(Japan) Hiroyuki Endo (Japan) Kenichi Hayakawa
March 7	All England Open; Birmingham, England; Superseries Premier $550,000 – 32MS/32WS/32MD/32WD/32XD; Draw	(Japan) Misaki Matsutomo (Japan) Ayaka Takahashi; 21–10, 21–12	(China) Tang Yuanting (China) Yu Yang
March 7	All England Open; Birmingham, England; Superseries Premier $550,000 – 32MS/32WS/32MD/32WD/32XD; Draw	(Indonesia) Praveen Jordan (Indonesia) Debby Susanto; 21–12, 21–17	(Denmark) Joachim Fischer Nielsen (Denmark) Christinna Pedersen
March 7	Brazil International; São Paulo, Brazil; International Challenge $17,500 – 64MS/32WS/32MD/32WD/32XD; Draw	(Portugal) Pedro Martins; 21–18, 22–20	(Poland) Adrian Dziółko
March 7	Brazil International; São Paulo, Brazil; International Challenge $17,500 – 64MS/32WS/32MD/32WD/32XD; Draw	(Turkey) Neslihan Yigit; 21–13, 21–15	(Japan) Chisato Hoshi
March 7	Brazil International; São Paulo, Brazil; International Challenge $17,500 – 64MS/32WS/32MD/32WD/32XD; Draw	(Poland) Adam Cwalina (Poland) Przemyslaw Wacha; 21–15, 21–16	(India) Alwin Francis (India) Tarun Kona
March 7	Brazil International; São Paulo, Brazil; International Challenge $17,500 – 64MS/32WS/32MD/32WD/32XD; Draw	(Japan) Chisato Hoshi (Japan) Naru Shinoya; 21–13, 21–19	(Australia) Setyana Mapasa (Australia) Gronya Somerville
March 7	Brazil International; São Paulo, Brazil; International Challenge $17,500 – 64MS/32WS/32MD/32WD/32XD; Draw	(Canada) Toby Ng (Canada) Alex Bruce; 21–12, 21–15	(Austria) David Obernosterer (Austria) Elisabeth Baldauf
March 7	Portugal International; Caldas da Rainha, Portugal; International Series $5,000 – 32MS/32WS/32MD/32WD/32XD; Draw	(Sri Lanka) Niluka Karunaratne; 21–17, 21–13	(Sweden) Gabriel Ulldahl
March 7	Portugal International; Caldas da Rainha, Portugal; International Series $5,000 – 32MS/32WS/32MD/32WD/32XD; Draw	(Denmark) Mia Blichfeldt; 21–12, 21–14	(England) Chloe Birch
March 7	Portugal International; Caldas da Rainha, Portugal; International Series $5,000 – 32MS/32WS/32MD/32WD/32XD; Draw	(Malaysia) Ong Yew Sin (Malaysia) Teo Ee Yi; 21–17, 24–22	(Vietnam) Do Tuan Duc (Vietnam) Pham Hong Nam
March 7	Portugal International; Caldas da Rainha, Portugal; International Series $5,000 – 32MS/32WS/32MD/32WD/32XD; Draw	(Malaysia) Goh Yea Ching (Malaysia) Peck Yen Wei; 21–9, 21–15	(England) Chloe Birch (England) Sarah Walker
March 7	Portugal International; Caldas da Rainha, Portugal; International Series $5,000 – 32MS/32WS/32MD/32WD/32XD; Draw	(Denmark) Mikkel Mikkelsen (Denmark) Mai Surrow; 21–19, 17–21, 21–19	(Vietnam) Do Tuan Duc (Vietnam) Pham Nhu Thao
March 14	Swiss Open; Basel, Switzerland; Grand Prix Gold $120,000 – 64MS/32WS/32MD/32WD/32XD; Draw	(India) H. S. Prannoy; 21–18, 21–15	(Germany) Marc Zwiebler
March 14	Swiss Open; Basel, Switzerland; Grand Prix Gold $120,000 – 64MS/32WS/32MD/32WD/32XD; Draw	(China) He Bingjiao; 21–16, 21–10	(China) Wang Yihan
March 14	Swiss Open; Basel, Switzerland; Grand Prix Gold $120,000 – 64MS/32WS/32MD/32WD/32XD; Draw	(Denmark) Kim Astrup (Denmark) Anders Skaarup Rasmussen; 21–8, 21–15	(Chinese Taipei) Lee Sheng-mu (Chinese Taipei) Tsai Chia-hsin
March 14	Swiss Open; Basel, Switzerland; Grand Prix Gold $120,000 – 64MS/32WS/32MD/32WD/32XD; Draw	(Japan) Shizuka Matsuo (Japan) Mami Naito; 21–16, 12–21, 21–12	(Japan) Naoko Fukuman (Japan) Kurumi Yonao
March 14	Swiss Open; Basel, Switzerland; Grand Prix Gold $120,000 – 64MS/32WS/32MD/32WD/32XD; Draw	(China) Wang Yilyu (China) Chen Qingchen; 19–21, 21–16, 21–15	(Thailand) Bodin Issara (Thailand) Savitree Amitrapai
March 14	Jamaica International; Kingston, Jamaica; International Series $6,000 –64MS/32WS/32MD/32WD/32XD; Draw	(Portugal) Pedro Martins; 21–19, 21–17	(Austria) David Obernosterer
March 14	Jamaica International; Kingston, Jamaica; International Series $6,000 –64MS/32WS/32MD/32WD/32XD; Draw	(Italy) Jeanine Cicognini; 21–16, 22–20	(Lithuania) Akvile Stapusaityte
March 14	Jamaica International; Kingston, Jamaica; International Series $6,000 –64MS/32WS/32MD/32WD/32XD; Draw	(Belgium) Matijs Dierickx (Belgium) Freek Golinski; 21–19 (retired)	(India) Alwin Francis (India) Tarun Kona
March 14	Jamaica International; Kingston, Jamaica; International Series $6,000 –64MS/32WS/32MD/32WD/32XD; Draw	(Jamaica) Ruth Williams (Jamaica) Katherine Wynter; 21–17, 10–21, 21–15	(Jamaica) Geordine Henry (Jamaica) Mikaylia Haldane
March 14	Jamaica International; Kingston, Jamaica; International Series $6,000 –64MS/32WS/32MD/32WD/32XD; Draw	(Austria) David Obernosterer (Austria) Elisabeth Baldauf; 21–19, 18–21, 21–11	(United States) Bjorn Seguin (Mexico) Mariana Ugalde
March 14	Romanian International; Timișoara, Romania; International Series $6,000 –64MS/32WS/32MD/32WD/32XD; Draw	(Thailand) Pannawit Thongnuam; 21–17, 21–13	(Denmark) Patrick Bjerregaard
March 14	Romanian International; Timișoara, Romania; International Series $6,000 –64MS/32WS/32MD/32WD/32XD; Draw	(Malaysia) Lee Ying Ying; 17–21, 21–13, 21–9	(Malaysia) Lim Yin Fun
March 14	Romanian International; Timișoara, Romania; International Series $6,000 –64MS/32WS/32MD/32WD/32XD; Draw	(Malaysia) Ong Yew Sin (Malaysia) Teo Ee Yi; 21–13, 21–9	(Croatia) Zvonimir Durkinjak (Croatia) Zvonimir Hoelbling
March 14	Romanian International; Timișoara, Romania; International Series $6,000 –64MS/32WS/32MD/32WD/32XD; Draw	(England) Jessica Pugh (Netherlands) Cheryl Seinen; 21–19, 21–15	(Malaysia) Goh Yea Ching (Malaysia) Peck Yen Wei
March 14	Romanian International; Timișoara, Romania; International Series $6,000 –64MS/32WS/32MD/32WD/32XD; Draw	(Malaysia) Wong Fai Yin (Malaysia) Shevon Jemie Lai; 21–15, 21–17	(Malaysia) Ong Yew Sin (Malaysia) Peck Yen Wei
March 14	Waikato International; Hamilton, New Zealand; Future Series; 64MS/32WS/32MD/32WD/32XD; Draw	(Vietnam) Nguyễn Tiến Minh; 21–23, 21–8, 21–8	(Chinese Taipei) Shih Kuei-chun
March 14	Waikato International; Hamilton, New Zealand; Future Series; 64MS/32WS/32MD/32WD/32XD; Draw	(Vietnam) Vu Thi Trang; 21–12, 21–15	(Australia) Hsuan-Yu Wendy Chen
March 14	Waikato International; Hamilton, New Zealand; Future Series; 64MS/32WS/32MD/32WD/32XD; Draw	(Chinese Taipei) Liu Wei-chen (Chinese Taipei) Yang Po-han; 22–20, 21–10	(Chinese Taipei) Su Cheng-heng (Chinese Taipei) Yang Po-hsuan
March 14	Waikato International; Hamilton, New Zealand; Future Series; 64MS/32WS/32MD/32WD/32XD; Draw	(Australia) Tiffany Ho (Australia) Jennifer Tam; 21–19, 18–21, 21–12	(New Zealand) Vicki Copeland (New Zealand) Anona Pak
March 14	Waikato International; Hamilton, New Zealand; Future Series; 64MS/32WS/32MD/32WD/32XD; Draw	(New Zealand) Kevin Dennerly-Minturn (New Zealand) Susannah Leydon-Davis; 21–13, 21–14	(New Zealand) Abhinav Manota (New Zealand) Justine Villegas
March 21	New Zealand Open; Auckland, New Zealand; Grand Prix Gold $120,000 – 64MS/32WS/32MD/32WD/32XD; Draw	(China) Huang Yuxiang; 21–12, 21–17	(Japan) Riichi Takeshita
March 21	New Zealand Open; Auckland, New Zealand; Grand Prix Gold $120,000 – 64MS/32WS/32MD/32WD/32XD; Draw	(South Korea) Sung Ji-hyun; 21–15, 21–17	(Japan) Aya Ohori
March 21	New Zealand Open; Auckland, New Zealand; Grand Prix Gold $120,000 – 64MS/32WS/32MD/32WD/32XD; Draw	(South Korea) Ko Sung-hyun (South Korea) Shin Baek-cheol; 21–18, 21–14	(Indonesia) Angga Pratama (Indonesia) Ricky Karanda Suwardi
March 21	New Zealand Open; Auckland, New Zealand; Grand Prix Gold $120,000 – 64MS/32WS/32MD/32WD/32XD; Draw	(Japan) Yuki Fukushima (Japan) Sayaka Hirota; 21–13, 21–16	(South Korea) Chang Ye-na (South Korea) Lee So-hee
March 21	New Zealand Open; Auckland, New Zealand; Grand Prix Gold $120,000 – 64MS/32WS/32MD/32WD/32XD; Draw	(Malaysia) Chan Peng Soon (Malaysia) Goh Liu Ying; 21–19, 22–20	(China) Zheng Siwei (China) Li Yinhui
March 21	Polish Open; Warsaw, Poland; International Challenge $17,500 – 64MS/32WS/32MD/32WD/32XD; Draw	(France) Thomas Rouxel; 21–11, 21–16	(Finland) Eetu Heino
March 21	Polish Open; Warsaw, Poland; International Challenge $17,500 – 64MS/32WS/32MD/32WD/32XD; Draw	(France) Delphine Lansac; 21–19, 21–11	(Turkey) Neslihan Yigit
March 21	Polish Open; Warsaw, Poland; International Challenge $17,500 – 64MS/32WS/32MD/32WD/32XD; Draw	(Indonesia) Hardianto (Indonesia) Kenas Adi Haryanto; 21–5, 18–21, 21–15	(Thailand) Dechapol Puavaranukroh (Thailand) Kedren Kittinupong
March 21	Polish Open; Warsaw, Poland; International Challenge $17,500 – 64MS/32WS/32MD/32WD/32XD; Draw	(Thailand) Puttita Supajirakul (Thailand) Sapsiree Taerattanachai; 21–7, 21–17	(Malaysia) Chow Mei Kuan (Malaysia) Lee Meng Yean
March 21	Polish Open; Warsaw, Poland; International Challenge $17,500 – 64MS/32WS/32MD/32WD/32XD; Draw	(Poland) Robert Mateusiak (Poland) Nadiezda Zieba; 21–11, 21–16	(Malaysia) Tan Kian Meng (Malaysia) Lai Pei Jing
March 21	Giraldilla International; La Habana, Cuba; International Series $6,000 –64MS/32WS/32MD/32WD/32XD; Draw	(Cuba) Osleni Guerrero; 21–16, 21–17	(Austria) Luka Wraber
March 21	Giraldilla International; La Habana, Cuba; International Series $6,000 –64MS/32WS/32MD/32WD/32XD; Draw	(Austria) Elisabeth Baldauf; 21–11, 21–14	(Peru) Daniela Macias
March 21	Giraldilla International; La Habana, Cuba; International Series $6,000 –64MS/32WS/32MD/32WD/32XD; Draw	(Cuba) Leodannis Martinez (Cuba) Ernesto Reyes; 21–12, 21–12	(Cuba) Ángel Herrera (Cuba) Lázaro Madera
March 21	Giraldilla International; La Habana, Cuba; International Series $6,000 –64MS/32WS/32MD/32WD/32XD; Draw	(Peru) Daniela Macias (Peru) Luz Maria Zornoza; 21–3, 21–6	(Cuba) Yuvisleydis Ramírez (Cuba) Adaivis Robinson
March 21	Giraldilla International; La Habana, Cuba; International Series $6,000 –64MS/32WS/32MD/32WD/32XD; Draw	(Austria) David Obernosterer (Austria) Elisabeth Baldauf; 21–12, 21–12	(United States) Bjorn Seguin (Mexico) Mariana Ugalde
March 28	India Open; New Delhi, India; Superseries $300,000 – 32MS/32WS/32MD/32WD/32XD; Draw	(Japan) Kento Momota; 21–15, 21–18	(Denmark) Viktor Axelsen
March 28	India Open; New Delhi, India; Superseries $300,000 – 32MS/32WS/32MD/32WD/32XD; Draw	(Thailand) Ratchanok Intanon; 21–17, 21–18	(China) Li Xuerui
March 28	India Open; New Delhi, India; Superseries $300,000 – 32MS/32WS/32MD/32WD/32XD; Draw	(Indonesia) Markus Fernaldi Gideon (Indonesia) Kevin Sanjaya Sukamuljo; 21–17, 21–13	(Indonesia) Angga Pratama (Indonesia) Ricky Karanda Suwardi
March 28	India Open; New Delhi, India; Superseries $300,000 – 32MS/32WS/32MD/32WD/32XD; Draw	(Japan) Misaki Matsutomo (Japan) Ayaka Takahashi; 21–18, 21–18	(Japan) Naoko Fukuman (Japan) Kurumi Yonao
March 28	India Open; New Delhi, India; Superseries $300,000 – 32MS/32WS/32MD/32WD/32XD; Draw	(China) Lu Kai (China) Huang Yaqiong; 21–13, 21–16	(Indonesia) Riky Widianto (Indonesia) Richi Puspita Dili
March 28	Orleans International; Orléans, France; International Challenge $17,500 – 64MS/32WS/32MD/32WD/32XD; Draw	(Denmark) Emil Holst; 21–17, 21–13	(Denmark) Rasmus Fladberg
March 28	Orleans International; Orléans, France; International Challenge $17,500 – 64MS/32WS/32MD/32WD/32XD; Draw	(Malaysia) Goh Jin Wei; 15–21, 21–10, 21–7	(Indonesia) Fitriani
March 28	Orleans International; Orléans, France; International Challenge $17,500 – 64MS/32WS/32MD/32WD/32XD; Draw	(Sweden) Richard Eidestedt (Sweden) Nico Ruponen; 13–21, 21–12, 21–19	(Indonesia) Hardianto (Indonesia) Kenas Adi Haryanto
March 28	Orleans International; Orléans, France; International Challenge $17,500 – 64MS/32WS/32MD/32WD/32XD; Draw	(England) Heather Olver (England) Lauren Smith; 21–19, 21–8	(France) Delphine Delrue (France) Lea Palermo
March 28	Orleans International; Orléans, France; International Challenge $17,500 – 64MS/32WS/32MD/32WD/32XD; Draw	(Denmark) Mathias Christiansen (Denmark) Lena Grebak; 21–14, 21–13	(Netherlands) Robin Tabeling (Netherlands) Samantha Barning
March 28	Ivory Coast International; Abidjan, Ivory Coast; Future Series; 64MS/32WS/32MD/32WD/32XD; Draw	(Uganda) Edwin Ekiring; 21–13, 12–21, 21–10	(Nigeria) Gideon Babalola
March 28	Ivory Coast International; Abidjan, Ivory Coast; Future Series; 64MS/32WS/32MD/32WD/32XD; Draw	(Sri Lanka) Lekha Shehani; 21–11, 21–14	(Nigeria) Uchechukwu Deborah Ukeh
March 28	Ivory Coast International; Abidjan, Ivory Coast; Future Series; 64MS/32WS/32MD/32WD/32XD; Draw	(Ivory Coast) Chandresh Kolleri Balakrishnan (Ivory Coast) Alex Patrick Zolobe; 21–8, 21–12	(Ivory Coast) N’Da Richard Kouakou (Ivory Coast) Koffi Stephane Kouame
March 28	Ivory Coast International; Abidjan, Ivory Coast; Future Series; 64MS/32WS/32MD/32WD/32XD; Draw	(Ivory Coast) Nogona Celine Bakayoko (Ivory Coast) Johanne Succar Saint-Blancat; 21–6, 21–17	(Ivory Coast) Fematou Chantal Markouma (Ivory Coast) Allathin Shella N'Guessan
March 28	Ivory Coast International; Abidjan, Ivory Coast; Future Series; 64MS/32WS/32MD/32WD/32XD; Draw	(Nigeria) Gideon Babalola (Nigeria) Uchechukwu Deborah Ukeh; 21–7, 21–10	(Benin) Tobiloba Oyewole (Benin) Xena Arisa

=== April ===
Week of	Tournament	Champions	Runners-up
April 4	Malaysia Open; Shah Alam, Malaysia; Superseries Premier $550,000 – 32MS/32WS/32MD/32WD/32XD; Draw	(Malaysia) Lee Chong Wei; 21–13, 21–8	(China) Chen Long
April 4	Malaysia Open; Shah Alam, Malaysia; Superseries Premier $550,000 – 32MS/32WS/32MD/32WD/32XD; Draw	(Thailand) Ratchanok Intanon; 21–14, 21–15	(Chinese Taipei) Tai Tzu-ying
April 4	Malaysia Open; Shah Alam, Malaysia; Superseries Premier $550,000 – 32MS/32WS/32MD/32WD/32XD; Draw	(South Korea) Kim Gi-jung (South Korea) Kim Sa-rang; 21–19, 21–15	(China) Chai Biao (China) Hong Wei
April 4	Malaysia Open; Shah Alam, Malaysia; Superseries Premier $550,000 – 32MS/32WS/32MD/32WD/32XD; Draw	(China) Tang Yuanting (China) Yu Yang; 21–11, 21–17	(South Korea) Jung Kyung-eun (South Korea) Shin Seung-chan
April 4	Malaysia Open; Shah Alam, Malaysia; Superseries Premier $550,000 – 32MS/32WS/32MD/32WD/32XD; Draw	(Indonesia) Tontowi Ahmad (Indonesia) Liliyana Natsir; 21–23, 21–13, 21–16	(Malaysia) Chan Peng Soon (Malaysia) Goh Liu Ying
April 4	Finnish Open; Vantaa, Finland; International Challenge $17,500 – 32MS/32WS/32MD/32WD/32XD; Draw	(Japan) Kanta Tsuneyama; 21–10, 21–14	(Vietnam) Nguyễn Tiến Minh
April 4	Finnish Open; Vantaa, Finland; International Challenge $17,500 – 32MS/32WS/32MD/32WD/32XD; Draw	(Denmark) Anna Thea Madsen; 19–21, 25–23, 21–12	(Japan) Rira Kawashima
April 4	Finnish Open; Vantaa, Finland; International Challenge $17,500 – 32MS/32WS/32MD/32WD/32XD; Draw	(Denmark) Mathias Christiansen (Denmark) David Daugaard; 21–23, 21–12, 21–12	(Poland) Adam Cwalina (Poland) Przemyslaw Wacha
April 4	Finnish Open; Vantaa, Finland; International Challenge $17,500 – 32MS/32WS/32MD/32WD/32XD; Draw	(Japan) Misato Aratama (Japan) Akane Watanabe; 21–12, 21–17	(Netherlands) Samantha Barning (Netherlands) Iris Tabeling
April 4	Finnish Open; Vantaa, Finland; International Challenge $17,500 – 32MS/32WS/32MD/32WD/32XD; Draw	(Denmark) Mathias Christiansen (Denmark) Lena Grebak; 18–21, 23–21, 21–16	(Denmark) Niclas Nohr (Denmark) Sara Thygesen
April 11	Singapore Open; Singapore City; Superseries $300,000 – 32MS/32WS/32MD/32WD/32XD; Draw	(Indonesia) Sony Dwi Kuncoro; 21–16, 13–21, 21–14	(South Korea) Son Wan-ho
April 11	Singapore Open; Singapore City; Superseries $300,000 – 32MS/32WS/32MD/32WD/32XD; Draw	(Thailand) Ratchanok Intanon; 18–21, 21–11, 21–14	(China) Sun Yu
April 11	Singapore Open; Singapore City; Superseries $300,000 – 32MS/32WS/32MD/32WD/32XD; Draw	(China) Fu Haifeng (China) Zhang Nan; 21–11, 22–20	(Japan) Takeshi Kamura (Japan) Keigo Sonoda
April 11	Singapore Open; Singapore City; Superseries $300,000 – 32MS/32WS/32MD/32WD/32XD; Draw	(Indonesia) Nitya Krishinda Maheswari (Indonesia) Greysia Polii; Walkover	(Japan) Misaki Matsutomo (Japan) Ayaka Takahashi
April 11	Singapore Open; Singapore City; Superseries $300,000 – 32MS/32WS/32MD/32WD/32XD; Draw	(South Korea) Ko Sung-hyun (South Korea) Kim Ha-na; 21–17, 21–14	(China) Xu Chen (China) Ma Jin
April 11	Peru International; Lima, Peru; International Challenge $17,500 – 64MS/64WS/16MD/8WD/16XD; Draw	(Brazil) Ygor Coelho; 21–11, 21–11	(Canada) Martin Giuffre
April 11	Peru International; Lima, Peru; International Challenge $17,500 – 64MS/64WS/16MD/8WD/16XD; Draw	(Germany) Karin Schnaase; 21–6, 21–17	(United States) Iris Wang
April 11	Peru International; Lima, Peru; International Challenge $17,500 – 64MS/64WS/16MD/8WD/16XD; Draw	(Poland) Adam Cwalina (Poland) Przemyslaw Wacha; 21–19, 18–21, 30–28	(India) Manu Attri (India) B. Sumeeth Reddy
April 11	Peru International; Lima, Peru; International Challenge $17,500 – 64MS/64WS/16MD/8WD/16XD; Draw	(Germany) Johanna Goliszewski (Germany) Carla Nelte; 21–18, 19–21, 21–19	(England) Heather Olver (England) Lauren Smith
April 11	Peru International; Lima, Peru; International Challenge $17,500 – 64MS/64WS/16MD/8WD/16XD; Draw	(Russia) Vitalij Durkin (Russia) Nina Vislova; 25–23, 21–14	(Russia) Evgenia Dimova (Russia) Evgenij Dremin
April 11	Croatian International; Zagreb, Croatia; Future Series $1,500 – 32MS/32WS/32MD/32WD/32XD; Draw	(Norway) Marius Myhre; 14–21, 22–20, 21–13	(Italy) Wisnu Haryo Putro
April 11	Croatian International; Zagreb, Croatia; Future Series $1,500 – 32MS/32WS/32MD/32WD/32XD; Draw	(Russia) Elena Komendrovskaja; 21–13, 21–19	(Belarus) Alesia Zaitsava
April 11	Croatian International; Zagreb, Croatia; Future Series $1,500 – 32MS/32WS/32MD/32WD/32XD; Draw	(Croatia) Zvonimir Durkinjak (Croatia) Filip Špoljarec; 21–14, 21–19	(Denmark) Patrick Bjerregaard (Denmark) Mikkel Normann
April 11	Croatian International; Zagreb, Croatia; Future Series $1,500 – 32MS/32WS/32MD/32WD/32XD; Draw	(Russia) Ksenia Evgenova (Russia) Elena Komendrovskaja; 21–16, 21–8	(Russia) Ekaterina Kut (Russia) Daria Serebriakova
April 11	Croatian International; Zagreb, Croatia; Future Series $1,500 – 32MS/32WS/32MD/32WD/32XD; Draw	(Croatia) Zvonimir Durkinjak (Croatia) Mateja Čiča; 21–18, 21–11	(Bulgaria) Alex Vlaar (Bulgaria) Mariya Mitsova
April 18	China Masters; Jiangsu, China; Grand Prix Gold $250,000 – 64MS/32WS/32MD/32WD/32XD; Draw	(China) Lin Dan; 21–17, 23–21	(China) Chen Long
April 18	China Masters; Jiangsu, China; Grand Prix Gold $250,000 – 64MS/32WS/32MD/32WD/32XD; Draw	(China) Li Xuerui; 21–16, 19–21, 21–6	(China) Sun Yu
April 18	China Masters; Jiangsu, China; Grand Prix Gold $250,000 – 64MS/32WS/32MD/32WD/32XD; Draw	(South Korea) Lee Yong-dae (South Korea) Yoo Yeon-seong; 21–17, 21–14	(South Korea) Kim Gi-jung (South Korea) Kim Sa-rang
April 18	China Masters; Jiangsu, China; Grand Prix Gold $250,000 – 64MS/32WS/32MD/32WD/32XD; Draw	(China) Luo Ying (China) Luo Yu; 16–21, 21–15, 21–18	(China) Chen Qingchen (China) Jia Yifan
April 18	China Masters; Jiangsu, China; Grand Prix Gold $250,000 – 64MS/32WS/32MD/32WD/32XD; Draw	(China) Xu Chen (China) Ma Jin; 21–17, 21–15	(China) Zheng Siwei (China) Chen Qingchen
April 18	Tahiti International; Punaauia, Tahiti; International Challenge $17,500 – 32MS/32WS/16MD/8WD/16XD; Draw	(Italy) Indra Bagus Ade Chandra; 24–22, 18–21, 21–9	(Czech Republic) Milan Ludik
April 18	Tahiti International; Punaauia, Tahiti; International Challenge $17,500 – 32MS/32WS/16MD/8WD/16XD; Draw	(Japan) Moe Araki; 21–17, 21–12	(Belgium) Lianne Tan
April 18	Tahiti International; Punaauia, Tahiti; International Challenge $17,500 – 32MS/32WS/16MD/8WD/16XD; Draw	(Poland) Adam Cwalina (Poland) Przemyslaw Wacha; 9–5 (retired)	(United States) Phillip Chew (United States) Sattawat Pongnairat
April 18	Tahiti International; Punaauia, Tahiti; International Challenge $17,500 – 32MS/32WS/16MD/8WD/16XD; Draw	(Japan) Akane Araki (Japan) Ayaka Kawasaki; 21–13, 21–12	(United States) Eva Lee (United States) Paula Lynn Obanana
April 18	Tahiti International; Punaauia, Tahiti; International Challenge $17,500 – 32MS/32WS/16MD/8WD/16XD; Draw	(Russia) Vitalij Durkin (Russia) Nina Vislova; 21–18, 16–21, 21–8	(United States) Phillip Chew (United States) Jamie Subandhi
April 18	Dutch International; Wateringen, Netherlands; International Series $10,000 – 32MS/32WS/32MD/32WD/32XD; Draw	(Spain) Pablo Abián; 21–16, 21–15	(Scotland) Kieran Merrilees
April 18	Dutch International; Wateringen, Netherlands; International Series $10,000 – 32MS/32WS/32MD/32WD/32XD; Draw	(Germany) Yvonne Li; 21–18, 21–18	(Denmark) Mette Poulsen
April 18	Dutch International; Wateringen, Netherlands; International Series $10,000 – 32MS/32WS/32MD/32WD/32XD; Draw	(Denmark) Alexander Bond (Denmark) Joel Eipe; 17–21, 21–17, 21–14	(Denmark) Frederik Aalestrup (Denmark) Mathias Moldt Baskjaer
April 18	Dutch International; Wateringen, Netherlands; International Series $10,000 – 32MS/32WS/32MD/32WD/32XD; Draw	(England) Chloe Birch (England) Sophie Brown; 21–4, 21–15	(Netherlands) Myke Halkema (Netherlands) Lisa Malaihollo
April 18	Dutch International; Wateringen, Netherlands; International Series $10,000 – 32MS/32WS/32MD/32WD/32XD; Draw	(Denmark) Ditte Søby Hansen (Denmark) Alexander Bond; 19–21, 23–21, 21–18	(England) Jessica Pugh (England) Ben Lane
April 18	Chile International; Temuco, Chile; International Series $1,500 – 16MS/16WS/8MD/4XD; Draw	(Cuba) Osleni Guerrero; 14–21, 21–8, 21–14	(Czech Republic) Jan Frohlich
April 18	Chile International; Temuco, Chile; International Series $1,500 – 16MS/16WS/8MD/4XD; Draw	(Turkey) Özge Bayrak; 21–18, 21–14	(Turkey) Neslihan Yigit
April 18	Chile International; Temuco, Chile; International Series $1,500 – 16MS/16WS/8MD/4XD; Draw	(Chile) Diego Castillo (Chile) Alonso Medel; 13–21, 22–20, 21–17	(Chile) Ivan Leon (Chile) Bastian Lizama
April 18	Chile International; Temuco, Chile; International Series $1,500 – 16MS/16WS/8MD/4XD; Draw	(Chile) Ivan Leon (Chile) Camila Macaya; 21–7, 18–21, 21–13	(Chile) Alonso Medel (Chile) Mickaela Skaric
April 25	Badminton Asia Championships; Wuhan, China; Continental Championships $200,000 –32MS/32WS/32MD/32WD/32XD; Draw	(Malaysia) Lee Chong Wei; 21–17, 15–21, 21–13	(China) Chen Long
April 25	Badminton Asia Championships; Wuhan, China; Continental Championships $200,000 –32MS/32WS/32MD/32WD/32XD; Draw	(China) Wang Yihan; 21–14, 13–21, 21–16	(China) Li Xuerui
April 25	Badminton Asia Championships; Wuhan, China; Continental Championships $200,000 –32MS/32WS/32MD/32WD/32XD; Draw	(South Korea) Lee Yong-dae (South Korea) Yoo Yeon-seong; 21–14, 28–26	(China) Li Junhui (China) Liu Yuchen
April 25	Badminton Asia Championships; Wuhan, China; Continental Championships $200,000 –32MS/32WS/32MD/32WD/32XD; Draw	(Japan) Misaki Matsutomo (Japan) Ayaka Takahashi; 21–13, 21–15	(Japan) Naoko Fukuman (Japan) Kurumi Yonao
April 25	Badminton Asia Championships; Wuhan, China; Continental Championships $200,000 –32MS/32WS/32MD/32WD/32XD; Draw	(China) Zhang Nan (China) Zhao Yunlei; 16–21, 21–9, 21–17	(Indonesia) Tontowi Ahmad (Indonesia) Liliyana Natsir
April 25	European Badminton Championships; La Roche-sur-Yon, France; Continental Championships; 64MS/64WS/32MD/32WD/32XD; Draw	(Denmark) Viktor Axelsen; 21–11, 21–16	(Denmark) Jan Ø. Jørgensen
April 25	European Badminton Championships; La Roche-sur-Yon, France; Continental Championships; 64MS/64WS/32MD/32WD/32XD; Draw	(Spain) Carolina Marín; 21–12, 21–18	(Scotland) Kirsty Gilmour
April 25	European Badminton Championships; La Roche-sur-Yon, France; Continental Championships; 64MS/64WS/32MD/32WD/32XD; Draw	(Denmark) Mads Conrad-Petersen (Denmark) Mads Pieler Kolding; 14–21, 21–18, 21–13	(Denmark) Kim Astrup (Denmark) Anders Skaarup Rasmussen
April 25	European Badminton Championships; La Roche-sur-Yon, France; Continental Championships; 64MS/64WS/32MD/32WD/32XD; Draw	(Denmark) Christinna Pedersen (Denmark) Kamilla Rytter Juhl; 21–18, 21–17	(Netherlands) Eefje Muskens (Netherlands) Selena Piek
April 25	European Badminton Championships; La Roche-sur-Yon, France; Continental Championships; 64MS/64WS/32MD/32WD/32XD; Draw	(Denmark) Joachim Fischer Nielsen (Denmark) Christinna Pedersen; 19–21, 21–13, 21–17	(Denmark) Niclas Nohr (Denmark) Sara Thygesen
April 25	Pan Am Team Championship; Campinas, Brazil; CC Team Championships; 7 teams (RR); Draw	Canada; 3–2	Brazil
April 25	Pan Am Badminton Championships; Campinas, Brazil; Continental Championships; 32MS/32WS/32MD/32WD/32XD; Draw	(Canada) Jason Ho-Shue; 21–17, 21–11	(Brazil) Artur Pomoceno
April 25	Pan Am Badminton Championships; Campinas, Brazil; Continental Championships; 32MS/32WS/32MD/32WD/32XD; Draw	(Canada) Brittney Tam; 21–11, 21–19	(Canada) Stephanie Pakenham
April 25	Pan Am Badminton Championships; Campinas, Brazil; Continental Championships; 32MS/32WS/32MD/32WD/32XD; Draw	(Canada) Jason Ho-Shue (Canada) Nyl Yakura; 21–13, 21–13	(Canada) Phillipe Gaumond (Canada) Maxime Marin
April 25	Pan Am Badminton Championships; Campinas, Brazil; Continental Championships; 32MS/32WS/32MD/32WD/32XD; Draw	(Canada) Michelle Tong (Canada) Josephine Wu; 21–17, 21–17	(Peru) Paula La Torre Regal (Peru) Luz Maria Zornoza
April 25	Pan Am Badminton Championships; Campinas, Brazil; Continental Championships; 32MS/32WS/32MD/32WD/32XD; Draw	(Canada) Nyl Yakura (Canada) Brittney Tam; 21–17, 21–17	(Canada) Nathan Osborne (Canada) Josephine Wu
April 25	Oceania Badminton Championships; Papeete, French Polynesia; Continental Championships; 32MS/32WS/32MD/32WD/32XD; Draw	(Australia) Ashwant Gobinathan; 21–17, 21–16	(French Polynesia) Remi Rossi
April 25	Oceania Badminton Championships; Papeete, French Polynesia; Continental Championships; 32MS/32WS/32MD/32WD/32XD; Draw	(Australia) Hsuan-Yu Wendy Chen; 21–13, 21–15	(Australia) Joy Lai
April 25	Oceania Badminton Championships; Papeete, French Polynesia; Continental Championships; 32MS/32WS/32MD/32WD/32XD; Draw	(Australia) Matthew Chau (Australia) Sawan Serasinghe; 21–11, 21–12	(French Polynesia) Leo Cucuel (French Polynesia) Remi Rossi
April 25	Oceania Badminton Championships; Papeete, French Polynesia; Continental Championships; 32MS/32WS/32MD/32WD/32XD; Draw	(Australia) Tiffany Ho (Australia) Jennifer Tam; 21–17, 19–21, 22–20	(Australia) Gronya Somerville (Australia) Melinda Sun
April 25	Oceania Badminton Championships; Papeete, French Polynesia; Continental Championships; 32MS/32WS/32MD/32WD/32XD; Draw	(Australia) Robin Middleton (Australia) Leanne Choo; 21–11, 21–9	(Australia) Anthony Joe (Australia) Joy Lai

=== May ===
Week of	Tournament	Champions	Runners-up
May 2	Hellas Open; Sidirokastro, Greece; International Series $6,000 – 32MS/32WS/32MD/32WD/32XD; Draw	(Denmark) Kim Bruun; 12–21, 21–19, 22–20	(Sweden) Gabriel Ulldahl
May 2	Hellas Open; Sidirokastro, Greece; International Series $6,000 – 32MS/32WS/32MD/32WD/32XD; Draw	(Germany) Fabienne Deprez; 16–4 (retired)	(Germany) Luise Heim
May 2	Hellas Open; Sidirokastro, Greece; International Series $6,000 – 32MS/32WS/32MD/32WD/32XD; Draw	(Poland) Miłosz Bochat (Poland) Paweł Pietryja; 14–21, 21–18, 21–16	(Sweden) Filip Michael Duwall Myhren (Denmark) Steve Olesen
May 2	Hellas Open; Sidirokastro, Greece; International Series $6,000 – 32MS/32WS/32MD/32WD/32XD; Draw	(Finland) Jenny Nyström (Finland) Sonja Pekkola; 21–17, 21–16	(Germany) Barbara Bellenberg (Germany) Eva Janssens
May 2	Hellas Open; Sidirokastro, Greece; International Series $6,000 – 32MS/32WS/32MD/32WD/32XD; Draw	(Poland) Paweł Pietryja (Poland) Aneta Wojtkowska; 21–17, 21–17	(Finland) Henri Aarnio (Finland) Jenny Nyström
May 9	Indonesia International Series; Surabaya, Indonesia; International Series $10,000 – 64MS/32WS/32MD/32WD/32XD; Draw	(Malaysia) Goh Giap Chin; 24–22, 21–19	(Indonesia) Krishna Adi Nugraha
May 9	Indonesia International Series; Surabaya, Indonesia; International Series $10,000 – 64MS/32WS/32MD/32WD/32XD; Draw	(Japan) Moe Araki; 21–17, 21–13	(Indonesia) Priskila Siahaya
May 9	Indonesia International Series; Surabaya, Indonesia; International Series $10,000 – 64MS/32WS/32MD/32WD/32XD; Draw	(Indonesia) Fajar Alfian (Indonesia) Muhammad Rian Ardianto; 21–12, 21–19	(Japan) Yoshiki Tsukamoto (Japan) Shunsuke Yamamura
May 9	Indonesia International Series; Surabaya, Indonesia; International Series $10,000 – 64MS/32WS/32MD/32WD/32XD; Draw	(Indonesia) Apriyani Rahayu (Indonesia) Jauza Fadhila Sugiarto; 12–21, 21–18, 22–20	(Indonesia) Dian Fitriani (Indonesia) Nadya Melati
May 9	Indonesia International Series; Surabaya, Indonesia; International Series $10,000 – 64MS/32WS/32MD/32WD/32XD; Draw	(Indonesia) Agripina Prima Rahmanto Putra (Indonesia) Apriyani Rahayu; 21–12, 21–12	(Indonesia) Yantoni Edy Saputra (Indonesia) Marsheilla Gischa Islami
May 9	Slovenia International; Medvode, Slovenia; International Series $6,000 – 32MS/32WS/32MD/32WD/32XD; Draw	(Scotland) Kieran Merrilees; 21–14, 21–16	(Indonesia) Adi Pratama
May 9	Slovenia International; Medvode, Slovenia; International Series $6,000 – 32MS/32WS/32MD/32WD/32XD; Draw	(Denmark) Julie Dawall Jakobsen; 21–15, 21–7	(Denmark) Sofie Holmboe Dahl
May 9	Slovenia International; Medvode, Slovenia; International Series $6,000 – 32MS/32WS/32MD/32WD/32XD; Draw	(Republic of Ireland) Joshua Magee (Republic of Ireland) Sam Magee; 21–9, 20–22, 21–18	(Denmark) Mathias Bay-Smidt (Denmark) Frederik Søgaard
May 9	Slovenia International; Medvode, Slovenia; International Series $6,000 – 32MS/32WS/32MD/32WD/32XD; Draw	(England) Chloe Birch (England) Sarah Walker; 22–20, 21–19	(England) Jessica Pugh (Netherlands) Cheryl Seinen
May 9	Slovenia International; Medvode, Slovenia; International Series $6,000 – 32MS/32WS/32MD/32WD/32XD; Draw	(Denmark) Mikkel Mikkelsen (Denmark) Mai Surrow; 21–9, 21–14	(Denmark) Steve Olesen (Denmark) Sara Lundgaard
May 16	Thomas and Uber Cups; Kunshan, China; 16 teams (TC)/16 teams (UC); Draw	Denmark; 3–2	Indonesia
May 16	Thomas and Uber Cups; Kunshan, China; 16 teams (TC)/16 teams (UC); Draw	China; 3–1	South Korea
May 16	Smiling Fish International; Trang, Thailand; International Challenge $17,500 – 64MS/32WS/32MD/32WD/32XD; Draw	(Indonesia) Krishna Adi Nugraha; 21–18, 21–9	(Thailand) Suppanyu Avihingsanon
May 16	Smiling Fish International; Trang, Thailand; International Challenge $17,500 – 64MS/32WS/32MD/32WD/32XD; Draw	(Indonesia) Dinar Dyah Ayustine; 21–10, 21–14	(Indonesia) Ruselli Hartawan
May 16	Smiling Fish International; Trang, Thailand; International Challenge $17,500 – 64MS/32WS/32MD/32WD/32XD; Draw	(Singapore) Danny Bawa Chrisnanta (Singapore) Hendra Wijaya; 14–21, 21–14, 21–14	(Malaysia) Nur Mohd Azriyn Ayub (Malaysia) Jagdish Singh
May 16	Smiling Fish International; Trang, Thailand; International Challenge $17,500 – 64MS/32WS/32MD/32WD/32XD; Draw	(Indonesia) Suci Rizky Andini (Indonesia) Yulfira Barkah; 21–18, 21–18	(Indonesia) Rahmadhani Hastiyanti Putri (Indonesia) Rika Rositawati
May 16	Smiling Fish International; Trang, Thailand; International Challenge $17,500 – 64MS/32WS/32MD/32WD/32XD; Draw	(Singapore) Terry Hee (Singapore) Tan Wei Han; 21–16, 21–17	(Malaysia) Wong Fai Yin (Malaysia) Shevon Jamie Lai
May 30	Indonesia Open; Jakarta, Indonesia; Superseries Premier $900,000 – 32MS/32WS/32MD/32WD/32XD; Draw	(Malaysia) Lee Chong Wei; 17–21, 21–19, 21–17	(Denmark) Jan Ø. Jørgensen
May 30	Indonesia Open; Jakarta, Indonesia; Superseries Premier $900,000 – 32MS/32WS/32MD/32WD/32XD; Draw	(Chinese Taipei) Tai Tzu-ying; 21–17, 21–8	(China) Wang Yihan
May 30	Indonesia Open; Jakarta, Indonesia; Superseries Premier $900,000 – 32MS/32WS/32MD/32WD/32XD; Draw	(South Korea) Lee Yong-dae (South Korea) Yoo Yeon-seong; 13–21, 21–13, 21–16	(China) Chai Biao (China) Hong Wei
May 30	Indonesia Open; Jakarta, Indonesia; Superseries Premier $900,000 – 32MS/32WS/32MD/32WD/32XD; Draw	(Japan) Misaki Matsutomo (Japan) Ayaka Takahashi; 21–15, 8–21, 21–15	(China) Tang Yuanting (China) Yu Yang
May 30	Indonesia Open; Jakarta, Indonesia; Superseries Premier $900,000 – 32MS/32WS/32MD/32WD/32XD; Draw	(China) Xu Chen (China) Ma Jin; 21–15, 16–21, 21–13	(South Korea) Ko Sung-hyun (South Korea) Kim Ha-na
May 30	Vietnam International Challenge; Hanoi, Vietnam; International Challenge $17,500 – 64MS/32WS/32MD/32WD/32XD; Draw	(Vietnam) Nguyễn Tiến Minh; 22–20, 21–16	(Chinese Taipei) Wang Tzu-wei
May 30	Vietnam International Challenge; Hanoi, Vietnam; International Challenge $17,500 – 64MS/32WS/32MD/32WD/32XD; Draw	(Vietnam) Vũ Thị Trang; 19–21, 21–19, 21–13	(Japan) Saena Kawakami
May 30	Vietnam International Challenge; Hanoi, Vietnam; International Challenge $17,500 – 64MS/32WS/32MD/32WD/32XD; Draw	(Malaysia) Ong Yew Sin (Malaysia) Teo Ee Yi; 21–19, 21–14	(Japan) Kenya Mitsuhashi (Japan) Yuta Watanabe
May 30	Vietnam International Challenge; Hanoi, Vietnam; International Challenge $17,500 – 64MS/32WS/32MD/32WD/32XD; Draw	(Japan) Yuki Fukushima (Japan) Chiharu Shida; 28–26, 21–15	(Japan) Shiho Tanaka (Japan) Koharu Yonemoto
May 30	Vietnam International Challenge; Hanoi, Vietnam; International Challenge $17,500 – 64MS/32WS/32MD/32WD/32XD; Draw	(Japan) Yuta Watanabe (Japan) Arisa Higashino; 21–16, 21–14	(Thailand) Tinn Isriyanet (Thailand) Pacharapun Chochuwong
May 30	Latvia International; Jelgava, Latvia; Future Series; 64MS/32WS/32MD/32WD/32XD; Draw	(France) Toma Junior Popov; 21–14, 21–14	(Finland) Kasper Lehikoinen
May 30	Latvia International; Jelgava, Latvia; Future Series; 64MS/32WS/32MD/32WD/32XD; Draw	(Russia) Elena Komendrovskaja; 21–17, 21–15	(Belarus) Alesia Zaitsava
May 30	Latvia International; Jelgava, Latvia; Future Series; 64MS/32WS/32MD/32WD/32XD; Draw	(Russia) Andrei Ivanov (Russia) Anton Nazarenko; 21–16, 21–15	(Russia) Vladimir Nikulov (Russia) Artem Serpionov
May 30	Latvia International; Jelgava, Latvia; Future Series; 64MS/32WS/32MD/32WD/32XD; Draw	(Russia) Ksenia Evgenova (Russia) Maria Shegurova; 16–21, 21–10, 21–7	(Belarus) Anastasiya Cherniavskaya (Belarus) Alesia Zaitsava
May 30	Latvia International; Jelgava, Latvia; Future Series; 64MS/32WS/32MD/32WD/32XD; Draw	(France) Thom Gicquel (France) Léonice Huet; 21–15, 18–21, 21–15	(Russia) Dmitrii Riabov (Russia) Maria Shegurova

=== June ===
Week of	Tournament	Champions	Runners-up
June 6	Australian Open; Sydney, Australia; Super Series $750,000 – 32MS/32WS/32MD/32WD/32XD; Draw	(Denmark) Hans-Kristian Vittinghus; 21–16, 19–21, 21–11	(South Korea) Jeon Hyeok-jin
June 6	Australian Open; Sydney, Australia; Super Series $750,000 – 32MS/32WS/32MD/32WD/32XD; Draw	(India) Saina Nehwal; 11–21, 21–14, 21–19	(China) Sun Yu
June 6	Australian Open; Sydney, Australia; Super Series $750,000 – 32MS/32WS/32MD/32WD/32XD; Draw	(Indonesia) Markus Fernaldi Gideon (Indonesia) Kevin Sanjaya Sukamuljo; 21–14, 21–15	(Indonesia) Angga Pratama (Indonesia) Ricky Karanda Suwardi
June 6	Australian Open; Sydney, Australia; Super Series $750,000 – 32MS/32WS/32MD/32WD/32XD; Draw	(China) Bao Yixin (China) Chen Qingchen; 23–21, 21–17	(Indonesia) Nitya Krishinda Maheswari (Indonesia) Greysia Polii
June 6	Australian Open; Sydney, Australia; Super Series $750,000 – 32MS/32WS/32MD/32WD/32XD; Draw	(China) Lu Kai (China) Huang Yaqiong; 21–18, 21–14	(China) Zheng Siwei (China) Chen Qingchen
June 6	Lithuanian International; Kaunas, Lithuania; Future Series; 32MS/32WS/32MD/32WD/32XD; Draw	(Finland) Kasper Lehikoinen; 21–12, 21–18	(Russia) Sergey Sirant
June 6	Lithuanian International; Kaunas, Lithuania; Future Series; 32MS/32WS/32MD/32WD/32XD; Draw	(Russia) Elena Komendrovskaja; 21–12, 21–13	(Denmark) Irina Amalie Andersen
June 6	Lithuanian International; Kaunas, Lithuania; Future Series; 32MS/32WS/32MD/32WD/32XD; Draw	(Poland) Lukasz Moren (Poland) Wojciech Szkudlarczyk; 11–21, 21–17, 21–19	(Russia) Andrei Ivanov (Russia) Anton Nazarenko
June 6	Lithuanian International; Kaunas, Lithuania; Future Series; 32MS/32WS/32MD/32WD/32XD; Draw	(Russia) Ekaterina Bolotova (Russia) Anastasiia Semenova; 21–14, 21–9	(Russia) Ekaterina Kut (Russia) Daria Serebriakova
June 6	Lithuanian International; Kaunas, Lithuania; Future Series; 32MS/32WS/32MD/32WD/32XD; Draw	(Russia) Denis Grachev (Russia) Ekaterina Bolotova; 21–11, 21–16	(Poland) Paweł Śmiłowski (Poland) Magdalena Świerczyńska
June 13	Spanish International; Madrid, Spain; International Challenge $17,500 – 64MS/32WS/32MD/32WD/32XD; Draw	(Denmark) Anders Antonsen; 14–21, 22–20, 21–18	(Japan) Kanta Tsuneyama
June 13	Spanish International; Madrid, Spain; International Challenge $17,500 – 64MS/32WS/32MD/32WD/32XD; Draw	(Japan) Ayumi Mine; 21–17, 21–13	(Spain) Beatriz Corrales
June 13	Spanish International; Madrid, Spain; International Challenge $17,500 – 64MS/32WS/32MD/32WD/32XD; Draw	(Japan) Takuro Hoki (Japan) Yugo Kobayashi; 21–10, 21–6	(Denmark) Mathias Christiansen (Denmark) David Daugaard
June 13	Spanish International; Madrid, Spain; International Challenge $17,500 – 64MS/32WS/32MD/32WD/32XD; Draw	(Japan) Sayaka Hirota (Japan) Nao Ono; 21–14, 13–21, 21–19	(Japan) Yuki Fukushima (Japan) Chiharu Shida
June 13	Spanish International; Madrid, Spain; International Challenge $17,500 – 64MS/32WS/32MD/32WD/32XD; Draw	(England) Ben Lane (England) Jessica Pugh; 21–14, 15–21, 21–14	(France) Gaetan Mittelheisser (France) Emilie Lefel
June 13	Mauritius International; Rose Hill, Mauritius; International Series $6,000 – 64MS/32WS/32MD/32WD/32XD; Draw	(India) Rahul Yadav Chittaboina; 21–18, 21–10	(India) C. Rohit Yadav
June 13	Mauritius International; Rose Hill, Mauritius; International Series $6,000 – 64MS/32WS/32MD/32WD/32XD; Draw	(India) Saili Rane; 21–12, 22–20	(Zambia) Ogar Siamupangila
June 13	Mauritius International; Rose Hill, Mauritius; International Series $6,000 – 64MS/32WS/32MD/32WD/32XD; Draw	(India) Satwiksairaj Rankireddy (India) Chirag Shetty; 21–12, 21–16	(India) Dhruv Kapila (India) Saurabh Sharma
June 13	Mauritius International; Rose Hill, Mauritius; International Series $6,000 – 64MS/32WS/32MD/32WD/32XD; Draw	(Malaysia) Lee Zhi Qing (India) Prajakta Sawant; 21–7, 21–6	(Zambia) Evelyn Siamupangila (Zambia) Ogar Siamupangila
June 13	Mauritius International; Rose Hill, Mauritius; International Series $6,000 – 64MS/32WS/32MD/32WD/32XD; Draw	(India) Satwiksairaj Rankireddy (India) K. Maneesha; 21–19, 11–21, 21–17	(Malaysia) Yogendran Khrishnan (India) Prajakta Sawant
June 27	Chinese Taipei Open; Taipei, Chinese Taipei; Grand Prix Gold $200,000 – 64MS/32WS/32MD/32WD/32XD; Draw	(Chinese Taipei) Chou Tien-chen; 21–18, 21–17	(China) Qiao Bin
June 27	Chinese Taipei Open; Taipei, Chinese Taipei; Grand Prix Gold $200,000 – 64MS/32WS/32MD/32WD/32XD; Draw	(Chinese Taipei) Tai Tzu-ying; 23–21, 21–6	(China) Wang Shixian
June 27	Chinese Taipei Open; Taipei, Chinese Taipei; Grand Prix Gold $200,000 – 64MS/32WS/32MD/32WD/32XD; Draw	(China) Li Junhui (China) Liu Yuchen; 21–17, 17–21, 24–22	(Chinese Taipei) Chen Hung-ling (Chinese Taipei) Wang Chi-lin
June 27	Chinese Taipei Open; Taipei, Chinese Taipei; Grand Prix Gold $200,000 – 64MS/32WS/32MD/32WD/32XD; Draw	(China) Huang Dongping (China) Zhong Qianxin; 21–18, 21–16	(China) Luo Ying (China) Luo Yu
June 27	Chinese Taipei Open; Taipei, Chinese Taipei; Grand Prix Gold $200,000 – 64MS/32WS/32MD/32WD/32XD; Draw	(China) Zheng Siwei (China) Chen Qingchen; 21–13, 21–16	(Malaysia) Tan Kian Meng (Malaysia) Lai Pei Jing
June 27	Canada Open; Calgary, Canada; Grand Prix $50,000 – 64MS/32WS/32MD/32WD/32XD; Draw	(India) B. Sai Praneeth; 21–12, 21–10	(South Korea) Lee Hyun-il
June 27	Canada Open; Calgary, Canada; Grand Prix $50,000 – 64MS/32WS/32MD/32WD/32XD; Draw	(Canada) Michelle Li; Walkover	(United States) Zhang Beiwen
June 27	Canada Open; Calgary, Canada; Grand Prix $50,000 – 64MS/32WS/32MD/32WD/32XD; Draw	(India) Manu Attri (India) B. Sumeeth Reddy; 21–8, 21–14	(Canada) Adrian Liu (Canada) Toby Ng
June 27	Canada Open; Calgary, Canada; Grand Prix $50,000 – 64MS/32WS/32MD/32WD/32XD; Draw	(Australia) Setyana Mapasa (Australia) Gronya Somerville; 21–15, 21–16	(England) Heather Olver (England) Lauren Smith
June 27	Canada Open; Calgary, Canada; Grand Prix $50,000 – 64MS/32WS/32MD/32WD/32XD; Draw	(Vietnam) Do Tuan Duc (Vietnam) Pham Nhu Thao; 21–9, 10–21, 21–13	(Sweden) Nico Ruponen (Sweden) Amanda Hogstrom
June 27	Hellas International; Sidirokastro, Greece; Future Series; 32MS/32WS/32MD/32WD/32XD; Draw	(Bulgaria) Ivan Rusev; 6–21, 21–16, 21–19	(Denmark) Kim Bruun
June 27	Hellas International; Sidirokastro, Greece; Future Series; 32MS/32WS/32MD/32WD/32XD; Draw	(Bulgaria) Mariya Mitsova; 21–7, 21–9	(France) Olivia Meunier
June 27	Hellas International; Sidirokastro, Greece; Future Series; 32MS/32WS/32MD/32WD/32XD; Draw	(Bulgaria) Daniel Nikolov (Bulgaria) Ivan Rusev; 21–19, 21–16	(Bulgaria) Peyo Boichinov (Bulgaria) Philip Shishov
June 27	Hellas International; Sidirokastro, Greece; Future Series; 32MS/32WS/32MD/32WD/32XD; Draw	(Bulgaria) Mariya Mitsova (Bulgaria) Petya Nedelcheva; 21–11, 21–9	(Germany) Annabella Jaeger (Germany) Vanessa Seele
June 27	Hellas International; Sidirokastro, Greece; Future Series; 32MS/32WS/32MD/32WD/32XD; Draw	(Bulgaria) Lilian Mihaylov (Bulgaria) Petya Nedelcheva; 21–18, 21–16	(Poland) Maciej Oceipa (Poland) Karolina Gajos

=== July ===
Week of	Tournament	Champions	Runners-up
July 4	U.S. Open; El Monte, United States; Grand Prix Gold $120,000 – 64MS/32WS/32MD/32WD/32XD; Draw	(South Korea) Lee Hyun-il; 24–22, 21–8	(Japan) Kanta Tsuneyama
July 4	U.S. Open; El Monte, United States; Grand Prix Gold $120,000 – 64MS/32WS/32MD/32WD/32XD; Draw	(Japan) Ayumi Mine; 16–21, 21–11, 21–15	(Japan) Saena Kawakami
July 4	U.S. Open; El Monte, United States; Grand Prix Gold $120,000 – 64MS/32WS/32MD/32WD/32XD; Draw	(Denmark) Mathias Boe (Denmark) Carsten Mogensen; 21–11, 22–20	(Japan) Takuro Hoki (Japan) Yugo Kobayashi
July 4	U.S. Open; El Monte, United States; Grand Prix Gold $120,000 – 64MS/32WS/32MD/32WD/32XD; Draw	(Japan) Shiho Tanaka (Japan) Koharu Yonemoto; 20–22, 21–15, 21–19	(Japan) Mayu Matsumoto (Japan) Wakana Nagahara
July 4	U.S. Open; El Monte, United States; Grand Prix Gold $120,000 – 64MS/32WS/32MD/32WD/32XD; Draw	(Japan) Yugo Kobayashi (Japan) Wakana Nagahara; 21–18, 21–14	(Poland) Robert Mateusiak (Poland) Nadiezda Zieba
July 4	White Nights; Gatchina, Russia; International Challenge $17,500 – 64MS/32WS/32MD/32WD/32XD; Draw	(France) Lucas Claerbout; 21–15, 21–11	(France) Lucas Corvee
July 4	White Nights; Gatchina, Russia; International Challenge $17,500 – 64MS/32WS/32MD/32WD/32XD; Draw	(Turkey) Neslihan Yigit; 21–16, 21–15	(Japan) Mako Urushizaki
July 4	White Nights; Gatchina, Russia; International Challenge $17,500 – 64MS/32WS/32MD/32WD/32XD; Draw	(Germany) Jones Ralfy Jansen (Germany) Josche Zurwonne; 21–15, 21–14	(France) Bastian Kersaudy (France) Julien Maio
July 4	White Nights; Gatchina, Russia; International Challenge $17,500 – 64MS/32WS/32MD/32WD/32XD; Draw	(Japan) Kugo Asumi (Japan) Megumi Yokoyama; 21–17, 21–7	(Russia) Anastasia Chervyakova (Russia) Olga Morozova
July 4	White Nights; Gatchina, Russia; International Challenge $17,500 – 64MS/32WS/32MD/32WD/32XD; Draw	(Germany) Michael Fuchs (Germany) Birgit Michels; 21–9, 21–12	(Russia) Vitalij Durkin (Russia) Nina Vislova
July 18	Vietnam Open; Ho Chi Minh City, Vietnam; Grand Prix $50,000 – 64MS/32WS/32MD/32WD/32XD; Draw	(Hong Kong) Wong Wing Ki; 21–12, 14–21, 21–13	(Malaysia) Chong Wei Feng
July 18	Vietnam Open; Ho Chi Minh City, Vietnam; Grand Prix $50,000 – 64MS/32WS/32MD/32WD/32XD; Draw	(Singapore) Yeo Jia Min; 21–14, 21–17	(Japan) Ayumi Mine
July 18	Vietnam Open; Ho Chi Minh City, Vietnam; Grand Prix $50,000 – 64MS/32WS/32MD/32WD/32XD; Draw	(Chinese Taipei) Lee Jhe-huei (Chinese Taipei) Lee Yang; 18–21, 21–14, 21–7	(Malaysia) Koo Kien Keat (Malaysia) Tan Boon Heong
July 18	Vietnam Open; Ho Chi Minh City, Vietnam; Grand Prix $50,000 – 64MS/32WS/32MD/32WD/32XD; Draw	(Indonesia) Della Destiara Haris (Indonesia) Rosyita Eka Putri Sari; 21–11, 21–15	(Indonesia) Tiara Rosalia Nuraidah (Indonesia) Rizki Amelia Pradipta
July 18	Vietnam Open; Ho Chi Minh City, Vietnam; Grand Prix $50,000 – 64MS/32WS/32MD/32WD/32XD; Draw	(Malaysia) Tan Kian Meng (Malaysia) Lai Pei Jing; 21–16, 21–11	(Indonesia) Alfian Eko Prasetya (Indonesia) Annisa Saufika
July 18	European University Games; Zagreb, Croatia; Multi-sport (University); 32MS/32WS/32MD/32WD/32XD; Draw|	(Turkey) Uludağ University	(France) University of Strasbourg
July 18	European University Games; Zagreb, Croatia; Multi-sport (University); 32MS/32WS/32MD/32WD/32XD; Draw|	(Turkey) Muhammed Ali Kurt; Erzincan University; 21–13, 21–10	(Turkey) Emre Lale; Uludağ University
July 18	European University Games; Zagreb, Croatia; Multi-sport (University); 32MS/32WS/32MD/32WD/32XD; Draw|	(Russia) Anastasia Chervyakova; Nizhny Novgorod University; 21–12, 20–22, 21–12	(Ukraine) Darya Samarchants; National University of Kharkiv
July 18	European University Games; Zagreb, Croatia; Multi-sport (University); 32MS/32WS/32MD/32WD/32XD; Draw|	(Poland) Milosz Bochat (Poland) Pawel Pietryja; Opole University; 21–6, 21–12	(France) Julien Maio (France) Matéo Martinez; University of Strasbourg
July 18	European University Games; Zagreb, Croatia; Multi-sport (University); 32MS/32WS/32MD/32WD/32XD; Draw|	(Ukraine) Anastasiya Dmytryshyn (Ukraine) Yelyzaveta Zharka; National University of Kharkiv; 26–24, 16–21, 21–13	(Russia) Anastasia Chervyakova (Russia) Kristina Virvich; Nizhny Novgorod University
July 18	European University Games; Zagreb, Croatia; Multi-sport (University); 32MS/32WS/32MD/32WD/32XD; Draw|	(France) Julien Maio (France) Rosy Pancasari; University of Strasbourg; 21–14, 21–19	(Poland) Pawel Pietryja (Poland) Aneta Wojtkowska; Opole University

=== August ===
Week of	Tournament	Champions	Runners-up
August 8	Olympic Games; Rio de Janeiro, Brazil; Multi-sport; 41MS/40WS/16MD/16WD/16XD; Draw	(China) Chen Long; 21–18, 21–18	(Malaysia) Lee Chong Wei
August 8	Olympic Games; Rio de Janeiro, Brazil; Multi-sport; 41MS/40WS/16MD/16WD/16XD; Draw	(Spain) Carolina Marín; 19–21, 21–12, 21–15	(India) P. V. Sindhu
August 8	Olympic Games; Rio de Janeiro, Brazil; Multi-sport; 41MS/40WS/16MD/16WD/16XD; Draw	(China) Fu Haifeng (China) Zhang Nan; 16–21, 21–11, 23–21	(Malaysia) Goh V Shem (Malaysia) Tan Wee Kiong
August 8	Olympic Games; Rio de Janeiro, Brazil; Multi-sport; 41MS/40WS/16MD/16WD/16XD; Draw	(Japan) Misaki Matsutomo (Japan) Ayaka Takahashi; 18–21, 21–9, 21–19	(Denmark) Christinna Pedersen (Denmark) Kamilla Rytter Juhl
August 8	Olympic Games; Rio de Janeiro, Brazil; Multi-sport; 41MS/40WS/16MD/16WD/16XD; Draw	(Indonesia) Tontowi Ahmad (Indonesia) Liliyana Natsir; 21–14, 21–12	(Malaysia) Chan Peng Soon (Malaysia) Goh Liu Ying
August 15	Bulgaria International; Sofia, Bulgaria; International Series $6,000 – 64MS/32WS/32MD/32WD/32XD; Draw	(Denmark) Patrick Bjerregaard; 21–14, 21–19	(Finland) Kalle Koljonen
August 15	Bulgaria International; Sofia, Bulgaria; International Series $6,000 – 64MS/32WS/32MD/32WD/32XD; Draw	(Spain) Clara Azurmendi; 26–24, 21–11	(Denmark) Julie Dawal Jakobsen
August 15	Bulgaria International; Sofia, Bulgaria; International Series $6,000 – 64MS/32WS/32MD/32WD/32XD; Draw	(Thailand) Pakin Kuna-anuvit (Thailand) Natthapat Trinkajee; 21–19, 21–19	(Bulgaria) Philip Shishov (Bulgaria) Alex Vlaar
August 15	Bulgaria International; Sofia, Bulgaria; International Series $6,000 – 64MS/32WS/32MD/32WD/32XD; Draw	(Turkey) Cemre Fere (Turkey) Neslihan Kılıç; 21–15, 21–19	(Bulgaria) Mariya Mitsova (Bulgaria) Petya Nedelcheva
August 15	Bulgaria International; Sofia, Bulgaria; International Series $6,000 – 64MS/32WS/32MD/32WD/32XD; Draw	(Russia) Rodion Alimov (Russia) Alina Davletova; Walkover	(Russia) Andrei Ivanov (Russia) Ksenia Evgenova
August 22	Carebaco International; Santa Cruz, Aruba; Future Series; 32MS/32WS/32MD/32WD/32XD; Draw	(Dominican Republic) Nelson Javier; 21–17, 13–21, 21–7	(Suriname) Sören Opti
August 22	Carebaco International; Santa Cruz, Aruba; Future Series; 32MS/32WS/32MD/32WD/32XD; Draw	(Wales) Aimee Moran; 21–18, 21–19	(Trinidad and Tobago) Solángel Guzmán
August 22	Carebaco International; Santa Cruz, Aruba; Future Series; 32MS/32WS/32MD/32WD/32XD; Draw	(Suriname) Dylan Darmohoetomo (Suriname) Gilmar Jones; 21–18, 21–15	(Dominican Republic) Therry Aquino (Dominican Republic) Reimi Cabrera
August 22	Carebaco International; Santa Cruz, Aruba; Future Series; 32MS/32WS/32MD/32WD/32XD; Draw	(Dominican Republic) Nairoby Jiménez (Dominican Republic) Bermary Polanco; 21–17, 21–23, 21–15	(Jamaica) Mikaylia Haldane (Jamaica) Katherine Wynter
August 22	Carebaco International; Santa Cruz, Aruba; Future Series; 32MS/32WS/32MD/32WD/32XD; Draw	(Barbados) Dakeil Thorpe (Barbados) Tamisha Williams; 21–10, 21–18	(Dominican Republic) Nelson Javier (Dominican Republic) Noemi Almonte
August 29	Brasil Open; Foz do Iguacu, Brazil; Grand Prix $55,000 – 32MS/32WS/32MD/8WD/32XD; Draw	(Malaysia) Zulfadli Zulkiffli; 18–21, 21–11, 21–17	(India) Anand Pawar
August 29	Brasil Open; Foz do Iguacu, Brazil; Grand Prix $55,000 – 32MS/32WS/32MD/8WD/32XD; Draw	(Spain) Beatriz Corrales; 21–13, 21–11	(Finland) Airi Mikkelä
August 29	Brasil Open; Foz do Iguacu, Brazil; Grand Prix $55,000 – 32MS/32WS/32MD/8WD/32XD; Draw	(Germany) Michael Fuchs (Germany) Fabian Holzer; 21–19, 21–18	(Germany) Jones Ralfy Jansen (Germany) Josche Zurwonne
August 29	Brasil Open; Foz do Iguacu, Brazil; Grand Prix $55,000 – 32MS/32WS/32MD/8WD/32XD; Draw	(Germany) Barbara Bellenberg (Germany) Eva Janssens; 21–7, 21–10	(Brazil) Bianca Lima (Brazil) Naira Vier
August 29	Brasil Open; Foz do Iguacu, Brazil; Grand Prix $55,000 – 32MS/32WS/32MD/8WD/32XD; Draw	(India) Pranaav Jerry Chopra (India) N. Sikki Reddy; 21–15, 21–16	(Canada) Toby Ng (Canada) Rachel Honderich
August 29	Singapore International; Singapore; International Series; 64MS/32WS/32MD/32WD/32XD; Draw	(Malaysia) Satheishtharan R. 21–19, 19–21, 21–13	(Hong Kong) Lee Cheuk Yiu
August 29	Singapore International; Singapore; International Series; 64MS/32WS/32MD/32WD/32XD; Draw	(Indonesia) Asty Dwi Widyaningrum; 21–19, 21–12	(Malaysia) Lee Ying Ying
August 29	Singapore International; Singapore; International Series; 64MS/32WS/32MD/32WD/32XD; Draw	(Malaysia) Goh Sze Fei (Malaysia) Nur Izzuddin; 21–13, 21–14	(Singapore) Danny Bawa Chrisnanta (Singapore) Hendra Wijaya
August 29	Singapore International; Singapore; International Series; 64MS/32WS/32MD/32WD/32XD; Draw	(Indonesia) Suci Rizky Andini (Indonesia) Yulfira Barkah; 21–14, 21–12	(Indonesia) Mychelle Crhystine Bandaso (Indonesia) Serena Kani
August 29	Singapore International; Singapore; International Series; 64MS/32WS/32MD/32WD/32XD; Draw	(Indonesia) Yantoni Edy Saputra (Indonesia) Marsheilla Gischa Islami; 21–9, 21–18	(Singapore) Danny Bawa Chrisnanta (Singapore) Citra Dewi Sari
August 29	Slovak Open; Trenčín, Slovakia; Future Series; 32MS/32WS/32MD/32WD/32XD; Draw	(Scotland) Matthew Carder; 11–6, 11–7, 11–6	(Bulgaria) Ivan Rusev
August 29	Slovak Open; Trenčín, Slovakia; Future Series; 32MS/32WS/32MD/32WD/32XD; Draw	(Ukraine) Natalya Voytsekh; 11–9, 11–3, 10–12, 13–11	(Indonesia) Priskila Siahaya
August 29	Slovak Open; Trenčín, Slovakia; Future Series; 32MS/32WS/32MD/32WD/32XD; Draw	(Poland) Łukasz Moreń (Poland) Wojciech Szkudlarczyk; 11–8, 11–8, 11–5	(Czech Republic) Jakub Bitman (Czech Republic) Pavel Drančák
August 29	Slovak Open; Trenčín, Slovakia; Future Series; 32MS/32WS/32MD/32WD/32XD; Draw	(Bulgaria) Mariya Mitsova (Bulgaria) Petya Nedelcheva; 11–5, 11–4, 11-3	(Ukraine) Vladyslava Lesnaya (Ukraine) Darya Samarchants
August 29	Slovak Open; Trenčín, Slovakia; Future Series; 32MS/32WS/32MD/32WD/32XD; Draw	(Czech Republic) Jakub Bitman (Czech Republic) Alžběta Bášová; 12–10, 11–4, 11–6	(Slovenia) Miha Ivanič (Slovenia) Nika Arih

=== September ===
Week of	Tournament	Champions	Runners-up
September 5	Indonesian Masters; Balikpapan, Indonesia; Grand Prix Gold $120,000 – 64MS/32WS/32MD/32WD/32XD; Draw	(China) Shi Yuqi; 21–12, 11–0 (retired)	(China) Huang Yuxiang
September 5	Indonesian Masters; Balikpapan, Indonesia; Grand Prix Gold $120,000 – 64MS/32WS/32MD/32WD/32XD; Draw	(Thailand) Busanan Ongbamrungphan; 21–15, 21–13	(Malaysia) Goh Jin Wei
September 5	Indonesian Masters; Balikpapan, Indonesia; Grand Prix Gold $120,000 – 64MS/32WS/32MD/32WD/32XD; Draw	(Indonesia) Wahyu Nayaka (Indonesia) Kevin Sanjaya Sukamuljo; 21–16, 21–18	(China) Han Chengkai (China) Zhou Haodong
September 5	Indonesian Masters; Balikpapan, Indonesia; Grand Prix Gold $120,000 – 64MS/32WS/32MD/32WD/32XD; Draw	(South Korea) Chae Yoo-jung (South Korea) Kim So-yeong; 21–18, 22–20	(Thailand) Jongkolphan Kititharakul (Thailand) Rawinda Prajongjai
September 5	Indonesian Masters; Balikpapan, Indonesia; Grand Prix Gold $120,000 – 64MS/32WS/32MD/32WD/32XD; Draw	(Indonesia) Ronald Alexander (Indonesia) Melati Daeva Oktaviani; 21–16, 21–17	(Malaysia) Tan Kian Meng (Malaysia) Lai Pei Jing
September 5	Internacional Mexicano; Guadalajara, Mexico; International Series $6,000 – 32MS/32WS/16MD/8WD/16XD; Draw	(Austria) Vilson Vattanirappel; 21–13, 15–21, 21–16	(United States) Hock Lai Lee
September 5	Internacional Mexicano; Guadalajara, Mexico; International Series $6,000 – 32MS/32WS/16MD/8WD/16XD; Draw	(Mexico) Haramara Gaitan; 15–21, 21–10, 21–17	(Mexico) Mariana Ugalde
September 5	Internacional Mexicano; Guadalajara, Mexico; International Series $6,000 – 32MS/32WS/16MD/8WD/16XD; Draw	(Mexico) Jesús Barajas (Mexico) Luis Montoya; 21–18, 17–21, 22–20	(Mexico) Mauricio Casillas (Mexico) Arturo Hernández
September 5	Internacional Mexicano; Guadalajara, Mexico; International Series $6,000 – 32MS/32WS/16MD/8WD/16XD; Draw	(Mexico) Cynthia González (Mexico) Mariana Ugalde; 21–16, 21–11	(Mexico) Natalia Leyva (Mexico) Vanessa Villalobos
September 5	Internacional Mexicano; Guadalajara, Mexico; International Series $6,000 – 32MS/32WS/16MD/8WD/16XD; Draw	(Austria) Vilson Vattanirappel (Mexico) Cynthia González; 15–21, 21–11, 21–14	(Mexico) Arturo Hernández (Mexico) Mariana Ugalde
September 12	Belgian International; Leuven, Belgium; International Challenge $17,500 – 64MS/32WS/32MD/32WD/32XD; Draw	(France) Lucas Corvee; 21–19, 21–19	(India) Sourabh Varma
September 12	Belgian International; Leuven, Belgium; International Challenge $17,500 – 64MS/32WS/32MD/32WD/32XD; Draw	(Malaysia) Sonia Cheah Su Ya; 21–11, 16–21, 21–16	(Denmark) Sofie Holmboe Dahl
September 12	Belgian International; Leuven, Belgium; International Challenge $17,500 – 64MS/32WS/32MD/32WD/32XD; Draw	(Chinese Taipei) Lu Ching-yao (Chinese Taipei) Yang Po-han; 21–13, 21–13	(Denmark) Frederik Colberg (Denmark) Rasmus Fladberg
September 12	Belgian International; Leuven, Belgium; International Challenge $17,500 – 64MS/32WS/32MD/32WD/32XD; Draw	(England) Chloe Birch (England) Lauren Smith; 24–22, 18–21, 21–18	(Denmark) Julie Finne-Ipsen (Denmark) Rikke Søby Hansen
September 12	Belgian International; Leuven, Belgium; International Challenge $17,500 – 64MS/32WS/32MD/32WD/32XD; Draw	(France) Ronan Labar (France) Audrey Fontaine; 21–19, 21–14	(Denmark) Alexander Bond (Denmark) Ditte Søby Hansen
September 12	Sydney International; Sydney, Australia; International Series $6,000 – 64MS/32WS/32MD/32WD/32XD	(Chinese Taipei) Lu Chia-hung; 21–13, 21–16	(Chinese Taipei) Chen Chun-wei
September 12	Sydney International; Sydney, Australia; International Series $6,000 – 64MS/32WS/32MD/32WD/32XD	(Japan) Shiori Saito; 21–14, 21–13	(China) Xu Wei
September 12	Sydney International; Sydney, Australia; International Series $6,000 – 64MS/32WS/32MD/32WD/32XD	(Chinese Taipei) Lee Fang-chih (Chinese Taipei) Lee Fang-jen; 10–21, 21–17, 21–13	(South Korea) Jung Young-keun (South Korea) Lee Jae-woo
September 12	Sydney International; Sydney, Australia; International Series $6,000 – 64MS/32WS/32MD/32WD/32XD	(Japan) Yuho Imai (Japan) Haruka Yonemoto; 21–16, 15–21, 21–18	(Japan) Erina Honda (Japan) Nozomi Shimizu
September 12	Sydney International; Sydney, Australia; International Series $6,000 – 64MS/32WS/32MD/32WD/32XD	(Chinese Taipei) Yang Ming-tse (Chinese Taipei) Lee Chia-hsin; 21–13, 22–20	(South Korea) Jung Young-keun (South Korea) Kim Na-young
September 12	World University Championships; Ramenskoe, Russia; FISU Event; Team/32MS/32WS/32MD/32WD/32XD	Chinese Taipei; 3–0	China
September 12	World University Championships; Ramenskoe, Russia; FISU Event; Team/32MS/32WS/32MD/32WD/32XD	(Chinese Taipei) Wang Tzu-wei; 21–6, 21–13	(Malaysia) Zulfadli Zulkiffli
September 12	World University Championships; Ramenskoe, Russia; FISU Event; Team/32MS/32WS/32MD/32WD/32XD	(Japan) Ayaho Sugino; 21–18, 21–14	(Chinese Taipei) Chiang Mei-hui
September 12	World University Championships; Ramenskoe, Russia; FISU Event; Team/32MS/32WS/32MD/32WD/32XD	(South Korea) Choi Sol-gyu (South Korea) Kim Jae-hwan; 19–21, 21–14, 21–17	(Chinese Taipei) Lee Jhe-huei (Chinese Taipei) Lee Yang
September 12	World University Championships; Ramenskoe, Russia; FISU Event; Team/32MS/32WS/32MD/32WD/32XD	(China) Du Peng (China) Huang Dongping; 21–18, 21–11	(South Korea) Lee Seung-hee (South Korea) Yoon Tae-kyung
September 12	World University Championships; Ramenskoe, Russia; FISU Event; Team/32MS/32WS/32MD/32WD/32XD	(Chinese Taipei) Lee Yang (Chinese Taipei) Hsu Ya-ching; 21–13, 21–19	(Malaysia) Mohd Lutfi Zaim Abdul Khalid (Malaysia) Shevon Jemie Lai
September 19	Japan Open; Tokyo, Japan; Superseries $300,000 – 32MS/32WS/32MD/32WD/32XD; Draw	(Malaysia) Lee Chong Wei; 21–18, 15–21, 21–16	(Denmark) Jan Ø. Jørgensen
September 19	Japan Open; Tokyo, Japan; Superseries $300,000 – 32MS/32WS/32MD/32WD/32XD; Draw	(China) He Bingjiao; 21–14, 7–21, 21–18	(China) Sun Yu
September 19	Japan Open; Tokyo, Japan; Superseries $300,000 – 32MS/32WS/32MD/32WD/32XD; Draw	(China) Li Junhui (China) Liu Yuchen; 21–12, 21–12	(South Korea) Kim Gi-jung (South Korea) Ko Sung-hyun
September 19	Japan Open; Tokyo, Japan; Superseries $300,000 – 32MS/32WS/32MD/32WD/32XD; Draw	(Denmark) Christinna Pedersen (Denmark) Kamilla Rytter Juhl; 19–21, 21–18, 21–12	(Japan) Misaki Matsutomo (Japan) Ayaka Takahashi
September 19	Japan Open; Tokyo, Japan; Superseries $300,000 – 32MS/32WS/32MD/32WD/32XD; Draw	(China) Zheng Siwei (China) Chen Qingchen; 21–10, 21–15	(South Korea) Ko Sung-hyun (South Korea) Kim Ha-na
September 19	Polish International; Bierun, Poland; International Series $6,000 – 32MS/32WS/32MD/32WD/32XD; Draw	(Denmark) Victor Svendsen; 29–27, 21–13	(India) Sourabh Varma
September 19	Polish International; Bierun, Poland; International Series $6,000 – 32MS/32WS/32MD/32WD/32XD; Draw	(India) Rituparna Das; 11–27, 21–7, 21–17	(India) Rasika Raje
September 19	Polish International; Bierun, Poland; International Series $6,000 – 32MS/32WS/32MD/32WD/32XD; Draw	(Chinese Taipei) Lu Ching-yao (Chinese Taipei) Yang Po-han; 21–16, 21–9	(England) Christopher Coles (England) Gregory Mairs
September 19	Polish International; Bierun, Poland; International Series $6,000 – 32MS/32WS/32MD/32WD/32XD; Draw	(India) Sanjana Santosh (India) Arathi Sara Sunil; 19–21, 21–19, 21–14	(Ukraine) Natalya Voytsekh (Ukraine) Yelyzaveta Zharka
September 19	Polish International; Bierun, Poland; International Series $6,000 – 32MS/32WS/32MD/32WD/32XD; Draw	(Denmark) Mikkel Mikkelsen (Denmark) Mai Surrow; 21–19, 21–12	(Poland) Paweł Pietryja (Poland) Aneta Wojtkowska
September 19	Colombia International; Neiva, Colombia; International Series $6,000 – 32MS/16WS/16MD/8WD/16XD	(Guatemala) Rubén Castellanos; 1–0 (retired)	(Guatemala) Rodolfo Ramírez
September 19	Colombia International; Neiva, Colombia; International Series $6,000 – 32MS/16WS/16MD/8WD/16XD	(Guatemala) Nikté Sotomayor; 21–9, 21–8	(Colombia) Laura Sanchez
September 19	Colombia International; Neiva, Colombia; International Series $6,000 – 32MS/16WS/16MD/8WD/16XD	(Guatemala) Rubén Castellanos (Guatemala) Aníbal Marroquín; Walkover	(Guatemala) Rodolfo Ramírez (Guatemala) Jonathan Solís
September 19	Colombia International; Neiva, Colombia; International Series $6,000 – 32MS/16WS/16MD/8WD/16XD	(Colombia) Ángela Ordóñez (Colombia) Magly Villamizar Ordoñez; 21–18, 18–21, 21–19	(Colombia) Maryi Ordoñez Cabrera (Colombia) Natalia Romero
September 19	Colombia International; Neiva, Colombia; International Series $6,000 – 32MS/16WS/16MD/8WD/16XD	(Guatemala) Jonathan Solís (Guatemala) Nikté Sotomayor; 17–21, 21–14, 21–15	(Colombia) Yamit Gironza (Colombia) Tatiana Muñoz
September 26	Korea Open; Seoul, South Korea; Superseries $600,000 – 32MS/32WS/32MD/32WD/32XD; Draw	(China) Qiao Bin; 21–11, 21–23, 21–7	(South Korea) Son Wan-ho
September 26	Korea Open; Seoul, South Korea; Superseries $600,000 – 32MS/32WS/32MD/32WD/32XD; Draw	(Japan) Akane Yamaguchi; 20–22, 21–15, 21–18	(South Korea) Sung Ji-hyun
September 26	Korea Open; Seoul, South Korea; Superseries $600,000 – 32MS/32WS/32MD/32WD/32XD; Draw	(South Korea) Lee Yong-dae (South Korea) Yoo Yeon-seong; 15–21, 22–20, 21–18	(China) Li Junhui (China) Liu Yuchen
September 26	Korea Open; Seoul, South Korea; Superseries $600,000 – 32MS/32WS/32MD/32WD/32XD; Draw	(South Korea) Jung Kyung-eun (South Korea) Shin Seung-chan; 21–13, 21–11	(China) Luo Ying (China) Luo Yu
September 26	Korea Open; Seoul, South Korea; Superseries $600,000 – 32MS/32WS/32MD/32WD/32XD; Draw	(South Korea) Ko Sung-hyun (South Korea) Kim Ha-na; 21–14, 21–19	(China) Zheng Siwei (China) Chen Qingchen
September 26	Czech International; Prague, Czech Republic; International Challenge $17,500 – 32MS/32WS/32MD/32WD/32XD; Draw	(Spain) Pablo Abián; 10–21, 21–17, 21–15	(Germany) Fabian Roth
September 26	Czech International; Prague, Czech Republic; International Challenge $17,500 – 32MS/32WS/32MD/32WD/32XD; Draw	(Denmark) Natalia Koch Rohde; 21–10, 21–15	(Denmark) Mette Poulsen
September 26	Czech International; Prague, Czech Republic; International Challenge $17,500 – 32MS/32WS/32MD/32WD/32XD; Draw	(Chinese Taipei) Lu Ching-yao (Chinese Taipei) Yang Po-han; 21–17, 20–22, 21–15	(Denmark) Mathias Bay-Smidt (Denmark) Frederik Søgaard
September 26	Czech International; Prague, Czech Republic; International Challenge $17,500 – 32MS/32WS/32MD/32WD/32XD; Draw	(England) Lauren Smith (England) Sarah Walker; 21–12, 21–18	(Bulgaria) Mariya Mitsova (Bulgaria) Petya Nedelcheva
September 26	Czech International; Prague, Czech Republic; International Challenge $17,500 – 32MS/32WS/32MD/32WD/32XD; Draw	(Denmark) Mathias Bay-Smidt (Denmark) Alexandra Bøje; 21–19, 21–15	(Russia) Vasily Kuznetsov (Russia) Ekaterina Bolotova
September 26	Vietnam International Series; Bac Ninh province, Vietnam; International Series $6,000 – 64MS/32WS/32MD/32WD/32XD; Draw	(Vietnam) Nguyễn Tiến Minh; 21–14, 23–21	(Malaysia) Lim Chi Wing
September 26	Vietnam International Series; Bac Ninh province, Vietnam; International Series $6,000 – 64MS/32WS/32MD/32WD/32XD; Draw	(Chinese Taipei) Chen Su-yu; 21–19, 23–21	(Malaysia) Lim Yin Fun
September 26	Vietnam International Series; Bac Ninh province, Vietnam; International Series $6,000 – 64MS/32WS/32MD/32WD/32XD; Draw	(Vietnam) Đỗ Tuấn Đức (Vietnam) Phạm Hồng Nam; 17–21, 21–19, 22–20	(Malaysia) Goh Sze Fei (Malaysia) Nur Izzuddin
September 26	Vietnam International Series; Bac Ninh province, Vietnam; International Series $6,000 – 64MS/32WS/32MD/32WD/32XD; Draw	(Vietnam) Nguyễn Thị Sen (Vietnam) Vũ Thị Trang; 21–18, 24–22	(Malaysia) Lim Yin Loo (Malaysia) Yap Cheng Wen
September 26	Vietnam International Series; Bac Ninh province, Vietnam; International Series $6,000 – 64MS/32WS/32MD/32WD/32XD; Draw	(Indonesia) Rinov Rivaldy (Indonesia) Vania Arianti Sukoco; 21–15, 22–20	(Indonesia) Andika Ramadiansyah (Indonesia) Angelica Wiratama
September 26	Ethiopia International; Addis Ababa, Ethiopia; International Series $6,000 – 32MS/32WS/16MD/8WD/16XD	(Italy) Rosario Maddaloni; 21–16, 21–18	(Hungary) Rudolf Dellenbach
September 26	Ethiopia International; Addis Ababa, Ethiopia; International Series $6,000 – 32MS/32WS/16MD/8WD/16XD	(Egypt) Menna El-Tanany; 10–21, 21–18, 21–18	(Zambia) Ogar Siamupangila
September 26	Ethiopia International; Addis Ababa, Ethiopia; International Series $6,000 – 32MS/32WS/16MD/8WD/16XD	(Italy) Matteo Bellucci (Italy) Fabio Caponio; 21–17, 19–21, 21–13	(Italy) Lukas Osele (Italy) Kevin Strobl
September 26	Ethiopia International; Addis Ababa, Ethiopia; International Series $6,000 – 32MS/32WS/16MD/8WD/16XD	(Italy) Silvia Garino (Italy) Lisa Iversen; 21–12, 9–21, 21–15	(Zambia) Evelyn Siamupangila (Zambia) Ogar Siamupangila
September 26	Ethiopia International; Addis Ababa, Ethiopia; International Series $6,000 – 32MS/32WS/16MD/8WD/16XD	(Egypt) Ahmed Salah (Egypt) Menna El-Tanany; 21–15, 21–9	(Zambia) Topsy Phiri (Zambia) Elizaberth Chipeleme

=== October ===
Week of	Tournament	Champions	Runners-up
October 3	Thailand Open; Bangkok, Thailand; Grand Prix Gold $120,000 – 64MS/32WS/32MD/32WD/32XD; Draw	(Thailand) Tanongsak Saensomboonsuk; 21–15, 21–16	(Indonesia) Sony Dwi Kuncoro
October 3	Thailand Open; Bangkok, Thailand; Grand Prix Gold $120,000 – 64MS/32WS/32MD/32WD/32XD; Draw	(Japan) Aya Ohori; 25–23, 21–8	(Thailand) Busanan Ongbamrungphan
October 3	Thailand Open; Bangkok, Thailand; Grand Prix Gold $120,000 – 64MS/32WS/32MD/32WD/32XD; Draw	(Indonesia) Berry Angriawan (Indonesia) Rian Agung Saputro; 17–21, 21–14, 21–18	(Japan) Takuto Inoue (Japan) Yuki Kaneko
October 3	Thailand Open; Bangkok, Thailand; Grand Prix Gold $120,000 – 64MS/32WS/32MD/32WD/32XD; Draw	(Thailand) Puttita Supajirakul (Thailand) Sapsiree Taerattanachai; 21–12, 21–17	(Japan) Mayu Matsumoto (Japan) Wakana Nagahara
October 3	Thailand Open; Bangkok, Thailand; Grand Prix Gold $120,000 – 64MS/32WS/32MD/32WD/32XD; Draw	(Malaysia) Tan Kian Meng (Malaysia) Lai Pei Jing; 21–16, 22–20	(Hong Kong) Tang Chun Man (Hong Kong) Tse Ying Suet
October 3	Russian Open; Vladivostok, Russia; Grand Prix $55,000 – 32MS/32WS/16MD/16WD/32XD; Draw	(Malaysia) Zulfadli Zulkiffli; 16–21, 21–19, 21–10	(India) Siril Verma
October 3	Russian Open; Vladivostok, Russia; Grand Prix $55,000 – 32MS/32WS/16MD/16WD/32XD; Draw	(India) Gadde Ruthvika Shivani; 21–10, 21–13	(Russia) Evgeniya Kosetskaya
October 3	Russian Open; Vladivostok, Russia; Grand Prix $55,000 – 32MS/32WS/16MD/16WD/32XD; Draw	(Russia) Vladimir Ivanov (Russia) Ivan Sozonov; 21–15, 21–14	(Russia) Konstantin Abramov (Russia) Alexandr Zinchenko
October 3	Russian Open; Vladivostok, Russia; Grand Prix $55,000 – 32MS/32WS/16MD/16WD/32XD; Draw	(Russia) Anastasia Chervyakova (Russia) Olga Morozova; 21–14, 22–20	(Russia) Evgeniya Kosetskaya (Russia) Ksenia Polikarpova
October 3	Russian Open; Vladivostok, Russia; Grand Prix $55,000 – 32MS/32WS/16MD/16WD/32XD; Draw	(India) Pranaav Jerry Chopra (India) N. Sikki Reddy; 21–17, 21–19	(Russia) Vladimir Ivanov (Russia) Valeria Sorokina
October 3	Argentina International; Buenos Aires, Argentina; Future Series $5,000 – 16MS/4WS/8MD/8XD; Draw	(Argentina) Dino Delmastro; 21–17, 21–19	(Argentina) Serafín Zayas
October 3	Argentina International; Buenos Aires, Argentina; Future Series $5,000 – 16MS/4WS/8MD/8XD; Draw	(Argentina) Barbara Maria Berruezo; 18–21, 24–22, 21–9	(Argentina) Daiana Garmendia
October 3	Argentina International; Buenos Aires, Argentina; Future Series $5,000 – 16MS/4WS/8MD/8XD; Draw	(Argentina) Javier de Paepe (Argentina) Martin Trejo; 19–21, 21–18, 21–11	(Argentina) Dino Delmastro (Argentina) Mateo Delmastro
October 3	Argentina International; Buenos Aires, Argentina; Future Series $5,000 – 16MS/4WS/8MD/8XD; Draw	(Argentina) Mateo Delmastro (Argentina) Micaela Suarez; 18–21, 23–21, 21–12	(Argentina) Javier de Paepe (Argentina) Natalia Montiel
October 3	Bulgarian International; Sofia, Bulgaria; Future Series; 2,000 – 32MS/32WS/16MD/16WD/16XD; Draw	(Bulgaria) Daniel Nikolov; 21–14, 21–18	(Scotland) Ben Torrance
October 3	Bulgarian International; Sofia, Bulgaria; Future Series; 2,000 – 32MS/32WS/16MD/16WD/16XD; Draw	(England) Panuga Riou; 21–15, 21–16	(Malaysia) Lyddia Cheah
October 3	Bulgarian International; Sofia, Bulgaria; Future Series; 2,000 – 32MS/32WS/16MD/16WD/16XD; Draw	(Bulgaria) Daniel Nikolov (Bulgaria) Ivan Rusev; 21–13, 21–18	(Turkey) Muhammed Ali Kurt (Turkey) Mert Tunco
October 3	Bulgarian International; Sofia, Bulgaria; Future Series; 2,000 – 32MS/32WS/16MD/16WD/16XD; Draw	(Turkey) Busra Yalçinkaya (Turkey) Fatma Nur Yavuz; 21–17, 21–17	(Malaysia) Lyddia Cheah (England) Grace King
October 3	Bulgarian International; Sofia, Bulgaria; Future Series; 2,000 – 32MS/32WS/16MD/16WD/16XD; Draw	(Turkey) Melih Turgut (Turkey) Fatma Nur Yavuz; 21–13, 21–16	(England) Ben Stawski (Bulgaria) Lubomira Stoynova
October 10	Chinese Taipei Masters; New Taipei City, Taiwan; Grand Prix $55,000 – 64MS/32WS/32MD/32WD/32XD; Draw	(India) Sourabh Varma; 12–10, 12–10, 3–3 (retired)	(Malaysia) Liew Daren
October 10	Chinese Taipei Masters; New Taipei City, Taiwan; Grand Prix $55,000 – 64MS/32WS/32MD/32WD/32XD; Draw	(Japan) Ayumi Mine; 12–10, 7–11, 11–9, 12–10	(Japan) Saena Kawakami
October 10	Chinese Taipei Masters; New Taipei City, Taiwan; Grand Prix $55,000 – 64MS/32WS/32MD/32WD/32XD; Draw	(Indonesia) Fajar Alfian (Indonesia) Muhammad Rian Ardianto; 11–6, 11–6, 11–13, 9–11, 12–10	(Chinese Taipei) Chen Hung-ling (Chinese Taipei) Wang Chi-lin
October 10	Chinese Taipei Masters; New Taipei City, Taiwan; Grand Prix $55,000 – 64MS/32WS/32MD/32WD/32XD; Draw	(Japan) Yuki Fukushima (Japan) Sayaka Hirota; 12–10, 11–5, 11–7	(Japan) Shiho Tanaka (Japan) Koharu Yonemoto
October 10	Chinese Taipei Masters; New Taipei City, Taiwan; Grand Prix $55,000 – 64MS/32WS/32MD/32WD/32XD; Draw	(Hong Kong) Tang Chun Man (Hong Kong) Tse Ying Suet; 11–3, 11–7, 14–12	(Japan) Ryota Taohata (Japan) Koharu Yonemoto
October 10	Dutch Open; Almere, Netherlands; Grand Prix $55,000 – 64MS/32WS/32MD/32WD/32XD; Draw	(Chinese Taipei) Wang Tzu-wei; 21–10, 17–21, 21–18	(India) Ajay Jayaram
October 10	Dutch Open; Almere, Netherlands; Grand Prix $55,000 – 64MS/32WS/32MD/32WD/32XD; Draw	(United States) Beiwen Zhang; 21–11, 21–19	(Chinese Taipei) Hsu Ya-ching
October 10	Dutch Open; Almere, Netherlands; Grand Prix $55,000 – 64MS/32WS/32MD/32WD/32XD; Draw	(Chinese Taipei) Lee Jhe-huei (Chinese Taipei) Lee Yang; 21–17, 21–17	(Denmark) Mathias Christiansen (Denmark) David Daugaard
October 10	Dutch Open; Almere, Netherlands; Grand Prix $55,000 – 64MS/32WS/32MD/32WD/32XD; Draw	(Australia) Setyana Mapasa (Australia) Gronya Somerville; 17–21, 21–17, 21–16	(Bulgaria) Gabriela Stoeva (Bulgaria) Stefani Stoeva
October 10	Dutch Open; Almere, Netherlands; Grand Prix $55,000 – 64MS/32WS/32MD/32WD/32XD; Draw	(Denmark) Mathias Christiansen (Denmark) Sara Thygesen; 21–18, 20–22, 21–16	(Denmark) Søren Gravholt (Denmark) Maiken Fruergaard
October 17	Denmark Open; Odense, Denmark; Superseries Premier $700,000 – 32MS/32WS/32MD/32WD/32XD; Draw	(Thailand) Tanongsak Saensomboonsuk; 21–13, 23–21	(South Korea) Son Wan-ho
October 17	Denmark Open; Odense, Denmark; Superseries Premier $700,000 – 32MS/32WS/32MD/32WD/32XD; Draw	(Japan) Akane Yamaguchi; 19–21, 21–14, 21–12	(Chinese Taipei) Tai Tzu-ying
October 17	Denmark Open; Odense, Denmark; Superseries Premier $700,000 – 32MS/32WS/32MD/32WD/32XD; Draw	(Malaysia) Goh V Shem (Malaysia) Tan Wee Kiong; 14–21, 22–20, 21–19	(Thailand) Bodin Isara (Thailand) Nipitphon Phuangphuapet
October 17	Denmark Open; Odense, Denmark; Superseries Premier $700,000 – 32MS/32WS/32MD/32WD/32XD; Draw	(Japan) Misaki Matsutomo (Japan) Ayaka Takahashi; 19–21, 21–11, 21–16	(South Korea) Jung Kyung-eun (South Korea) Shin Seung-chan
October 17	Denmark Open; Odense, Denmark; Superseries Premier $700,000 – 32MS/32WS/32MD/32WD/32XD; Draw	(Denmark) Joachim Fischer Nielsen (Denmark) Christinna Pedersen; 21–16, 22–20	(China) Zheng Siwei (China) Chen Qingchen
October 17	Pakistan International; Islamabad, Pakistan; International Series $6,000 – 32MS/16WS/16MD/8WD/16XD; Draw	(Pakistan) Rizwan Azam; 21–15, 21–18	(Pakistan) Muhammad Irfan Saeed Bhatti
October 17	Pakistan International; Islamabad, Pakistan; International Series $6,000 – 32MS/16WS/16MD/8WD/16XD; Draw	(Pakistan) Palwasha Bashir; 13–21, 21–18, 23–21	(Pakistan) Mahoor Shahzad
October 17	Pakistan International; Islamabad, Pakistan; International Series $6,000 – 32MS/16WS/16MD/8WD/16XD; Draw	(Pakistan) Rizwan Azam (Pakistan) Sulehri Kashif Ali; 21–14, 21–13	(Pakistan) Muhammad Irfan Saeed Bhatti (Pakistan) Azeem Sarwar
October 17	Pakistan International; Islamabad, Pakistan; International Series $6,000 – 32MS/16WS/16MD/8WD/16XD; Draw	(Pakistan) Palwasha Bashir (Pakistan) Saima Manzoor; 13–21, 21–11, 21–16	(Pakistan) Sidra Hamad (Pakistan) Khizra Rasheed
October 17	Pakistan International; Islamabad, Pakistan; International Series $6,000 – 32MS/16WS/16MD/8WD/16XD; Draw	(Nepal) Ratnajit Tamang (Nepal) Nangsal Tamang; 21–13, 21–15	(Pakistan) Muhammad Irfan Saeed Bhatti (Pakistan) Mehmona Ameer
October 17	Egypt International; Cairo, Egypt; International Series $6,000 – 32MS/32WS/16MD/16WD/32XD; Draw	(Czech Republic) Milan Ludík; 21–13, 22–20	(Czech Republic) Adam Mendrek
October 17	Egypt International; Cairo, Egypt; International Series $6,000 – 32MS/32WS/16MD/16WD/32XD; Draw	(Lithuania) Gerda Voitechovskaja; 21–14, 21–15	(Egypt) Menna El-Tanany
October 17	Egypt International; Cairo, Egypt; International Series $6,000 – 32MS/32WS/16MD/16WD/32XD; Draw	(France) Vanmael Heriau (France) Florent Riancho; 21-3, 21–9	(Egypt) Ali Ahmed El-Khateeb (Egypt) Abdelrahman Kashkal
October 17	Egypt International; Cairo, Egypt; International Series $6,000 – 32MS/32WS/16MD/16WD/32XD; Draw	(Belarus) Kristina Silich (Lithuania) Gerda Voitechovskaja; 21–7, 21–14	(Egypt) Nadine Ashraf (Egypt) Menna El-Tanany
October 17	Egypt International; Cairo, Egypt; International Series $6,000 – 32MS/32WS/16MD/16WD/32XD; Draw	(Egypt) Ahmed Salah (Egypt) Menna El-Tanany; 21–14, 21–10	(Belarus) Uladzimir Varantsou (Belarus) Kristina Silich
October 17	Swiss International; Yverdon-les-Bains, Switzerland; International Series $6,000 – 32MS/32WS/32MD/16WD/32XD; Draw	(England) Sam Parsons; 21–8, 21–17	(Ukraine) Artem Pochtarov
October 17	Swiss International; Yverdon-les-Bains, Switzerland; International Series $6,000 – 32MS/32WS/32MD/16WD/32XD; Draw	(Switzerland) Sabrina Jaquet; 16–21, 21–19, 21–15	(Malaysia) Lee Ying Ying
October 17	Swiss International; Yverdon-les-Bains, Switzerland; International Series $6,000 – 32MS/32WS/32MD/16WD/32XD; Draw	(Malaysia) Goh Sze Fei (Malaysia) Nur Izzuddin; 21–18, 21–12	(Malaysia) Aaron Chia (Malaysia) Wong Wai Jun
October 17	Swiss International; Yverdon-les-Bains, Switzerland; International Series $6,000 – 32MS/32WS/32MD/16WD/32XD; Draw	(Netherlands) Cheryl Seinen (Netherlands) Iris Tabeling; 13–21, 22–20, 21–10	(Malaysia) Amelia Alicia Anscelly (Malaysia) Teoh Mei Xing
October 17	Swiss International; Yverdon-les-Bains, Switzerland; International Series $6,000 – 32MS/32WS/32MD/16WD/32XD; Draw	(Switzerland) Oliver Schaller (Switzerland) Céline Burkart; 21–17, 10–21, 21–19	(France) Thom Gicquel (France) Delphine Delrue
October 24	French Open; Paris, France; Superseries $300,000 – 32MS/32WS/32MD/32WD/32XD; Draw	(China) Shi Yuqi; 21–16, 21–19	(South Korea) Lee Hyun-il
October 24	French Open; Paris, France; Superseries $300,000 – 32MS/32WS/32MD/32WD/32XD; Draw	(China) He Bingjiao; 21–9, 21–9	(United States) Beiwen Zhang
October 24	French Open; Paris, France; Superseries $300,000 – 32MS/32WS/32MD/32WD/32XD; Draw	(Denmark) Mathias Boe (Denmark) Carsten Mogensen; 19–21, 21–19, 3–0 (retired)	(Thailand) Bodin Isara (Thailand) Nipitphon Phuangphuapet
October 24	French Open; Paris, France; Superseries $300,000 – 32MS/32WS/32MD/32WD/32XD; Draw	(China) Chen Qingchen (China) Jia Yifan; 21–16, 21–17	(South Korea) Chang Ye-na (South Korea) Lee So-hee
October 24	French Open; Paris, France; Superseries $300,000 – 32MS/32WS/32MD/32WD/32XD; Draw	(China) Zheng Siwei (China) Chen Qingchen; 21–16, 21–15	(South Korea) Ko Sung-hyun (South Korea) Kim Ha-na
October 24	Hungarian International; Budapest, Hungary; International Challenge $17,5000 –32MS/32WS/32MD/32WD/32XD; Draw	(Denmark) Kim Bruun; 12–10, 11–6, 11–6	(Denmark) Victor Svendsen
October 24	Hungarian International; Budapest, Hungary; International Challenge $17,5000 –32MS/32WS/32MD/32WD/32XD; Draw	(Malaysia) Yap Rui Chen; 14–12, 11–5, 6–11, 11–8	(Denmark) Sofie Holmboe Dahl
October 24	Hungarian International; Budapest, Hungary; International Challenge $17,5000 –32MS/32WS/32MD/32WD/32XD; Draw	(Singapore) Danny Bawa Chrisnanta (Singapore) Hendra Wijaya; 11–7, 14–15, 7–11, 11–9, 11–8	(Denmark) Frederik Colberg (Denmark) Rasmus Fladberg
October 24	Hungarian International; Budapest, Hungary; International Challenge $17,5000 –32MS/32WS/32MD/32WD/32XD; Draw	(Bulgaria) Mariya Mitsova (Bulgaria) Petya Nedelcheva; 11–6, 11–6, 11–5	(Denmark) Gabriella Bøje (Denmark) Cecilie Sentow
October 24	Hungarian International; Budapest, Hungary; International Challenge $17,5000 –32MS/32WS/32MD/32WD/32XD; Draw	(Singapore) Terry Hee (Singapore) Tan Wei Han; 11–6, 11–7, 13–11	(Poland) Paweł Pietryja (Poland) Aneta Wojtkowska
October 24	Bahrain International Challenge; Seqaya, Bahrain; International Challenge $17,500 – 32MS/16WS/8MD/8WD/16XD; Draw	(India) Pratul Joshi; 21–17, 12–21, 21–15	(India) Aditya Joshi
October 24	Bahrain International Challenge; Seqaya, Bahrain; International Challenge $17,500 – 32MS/16WS/8MD/8WD/16XD; Draw	(Indonesia) Sri Fatmawati; 21–14, 21–16	(Indonesia) Asty Dwi Widyaningrum
October 24	Bahrain International Challenge; Seqaya, Bahrain; International Challenge $17,500 – 32MS/16WS/8MD/8WD/16XD; Draw	(Russia) Evgenij Dremin (Russia) Denis Grachev; 21–18, 21–17	(India) Vighnesh Devlekar (India) Rohan Kapoor
October 24	Bahrain International Challenge; Seqaya, Bahrain; International Challenge $17,500 – 32MS/16WS/8MD/8WD/16XD; Draw	(Bahrain) Tanisha Crasto (Indonesia) Aprilsasi Putri Lejarsar Variella; 21–12, 21–18	(India) Farha Mather (India) Ashna Roy
October 24	Bahrain International Challenge; Seqaya, Bahrain; International Challenge $17,500 – 32MS/16WS/8MD/8WD/16XD; Draw	(Russia) Evgenij Dremin (Russia) Evgenia Dimova; 21–15, 21–11	(Russia) Anatoliy Yartsev (Russia) Evgeniya Kosetskaya
October 24	Santo Domingo Open; Santo Domingo, Dominican Republic; International Series $6,000 – 32MS/32WS/16MD/8WD/16XD; Draw	(Italy) Matteo Bellucci; 21–16, 21–15	(Italy) Kevin Strobl
October 24	Santo Domingo Open; Santo Domingo, Dominican Republic; International Series $6,000 – 32MS/32WS/16MD/8WD/16XD; Draw	(Dominican Republic) Nairoby Jiménez; 18–21, 21–19, 21–18	(Italy) Lisa Iversen
October 24	Santo Domingo Open; Santo Domingo, Dominican Republic; International Series $6,000 – 32MS/32WS/16MD/8WD/16XD; Draw	(Dominican Republic) William Cabrera (Dominican Republic) Nelson Javier; 21–16, 21–15	(Italy) Lukas Osele (Italy) Kevin Strobl
October 24	Santo Domingo Open; Santo Domingo, Dominican Republic; International Series $6,000 – 32MS/32WS/16MD/8WD/16XD; Draw	(Dominican Republic) Nairoby Jiménez (Dominican Republic) Bermary Polanco; 21–8, 21–12	(Dominican Republic) Fanny Duarte (Wales) Aimee Moran
October 24	Santo Domingo Open; Santo Domingo, Dominican Republic; International Series $6,000 – 32MS/32WS/16MD/8WD/16XD; Draw	(Dominican Republic) William Cabrera (Dominican Republic) Licelott Sánchez; 21–10, 21–17	(Dominican Republic) César Brito (Dominican Republic) Nairoby Jiménez
October 31	Bitburger Open; Saarbrücken, Germany; Grand Prix Gold $120,000 – 64MS/32WS/32MD/32WD/32XD; Draw	(China) Shi Yuqi; 21–19, 22–20	(India) Sourabh Varma
October 31	Bitburger Open; Saarbrücken, Germany; Grand Prix Gold $120,000 – 64MS/32WS/32MD/32WD/32XD; Draw	(China) He Bingjiao; 21–11, 21–18	(Thailand) Nitchaon Jindapol
October 31	Bitburger Open; Saarbrücken, Germany; Grand Prix Gold $120,000 – 64MS/32WS/32MD/32WD/32XD; Draw	(Malaysia) Ong Yew Sin (Malaysia) Teo Ee Yi; 21–16, 21–18	(Germany) Michael Fuchs (Germany) Johannes Schoettler
October 31	Bitburger Open; Saarbrücken, Germany; Grand Prix Gold $120,000 – 64MS/32WS/32MD/32WD/32XD; Draw	(China) Chen Qingchen (China) Jia Yifan; 21–12, 21–19	(Thailand) Jongkolphan Kititharakul (Thailand) Rawinda Prajongjai
October 31	Bitburger Open; Saarbrücken, Germany; Grand Prix Gold $120,000 – 64MS/32WS/32MD/32WD/32XD; Draw	(China) Zheng Siwei (China) Chen Qingchen; 21–16, 23–21	(England) Chris Adcock (England) Gabby Adcock
October 31	USM Indonesia International; Semarang, Indonesia; International Challenge $20,000 – 64MS/32WS/32MD/32WD/32XD; Draw	(Indonesia) Shesar Hiren Rhustavito; 21–19, 11–21, 21–17	(Thailand) Suppanyu Avihingsanon
October 31	USM Indonesia International; Semarang, Indonesia; International Challenge $20,000 – 64MS/32WS/32MD/32WD/32XD; Draw	(Indonesia) Fitriani; 21–19, 21–18	(Indonesia) Hanna Ramadini
October 31	USM Indonesia International; Semarang, Indonesia; International Challenge $20,000 – 64MS/32WS/32MD/32WD/32XD; Draw	(Malaysia) Chooi Kah Ming (Malaysia) Low Juan Shen; 21–15, 21–19	(Malaysia) Lee Jian Yi (Malaysia) Lim Zhen Ting
October 31	USM Indonesia International; Semarang, Indonesia; International Challenge $20,000 – 64MS/32WS/32MD/32WD/32XD; Draw	(Malaysia) Lim Yin Loo (Malaysia) Yap Cheng Wen; 14–21, 15–10 (retired)	(Indonesia) Nisak Puji Lestari (Indonesia) Meirisa Cindy Sahputri
October 31	USM Indonesia International; Semarang, Indonesia; International Challenge $20,000 – 64MS/32WS/32MD/32WD/32XD; Draw	(Indonesia) Yantoni Edy Saputra (Indonesia) Marsheilla Gischa Islami; 19–21, 21–16, 21–17	(Indonesia) Irfan Fadhilah (Indonesia) Weni Anggraini
October 31	Hatzor International; Hatzor, Israel; Future Series; 32MS/16WS/16MD/4WD/16XD; Draw	(Czech Republic) Lukáš Zevl; 21–18, 14–21, 21–13	(Poland) Paweł Prądziński
October 31	Hatzor International; Hatzor, Israel; Future Series; 32MS/16WS/16MD/4WD/16XD; Draw	(Slovenia) Ana Marija Šetina; 21–16, 21–14	(Russia) Irina Shorokhova
October 31	Hatzor International; Hatzor, Israel; Future Series; 32MS/16WS/16MD/4WD/16XD; Draw	(Israel) Yonathan Levit (Israel) Ariel Shainski; 21–17, 21–19	(Poland) Paweł Prądziński (Poland) Jan Rudziński
October 31	Hatzor International; Hatzor, Israel; Future Series; 32MS/16WS/16MD/4WD/16XD; Draw	(Russia) Irina Shorokhova (Russia) Kristina Vyrvich; 21–12, 21–15	(Israel) Dana Kugel (Israel) Yana Molodezki
October 31	Hatzor International; Hatzor, Israel; Future Series; 32MS/16WS/16MD/4WD/16XD; Draw	(Israel) Ariel Shainski (Belarus) Kristina Silich; 19–21, 21–18, 21–13	(Russia) Aleksandr Vasilkin (Russia) Kristina Vyrvich
October 31	BWF World Junior Championships; Bilbao, Spain; Suhandinata Cup; Draw	China; 3–0	Malaysia

=== November ===
Week of	Tournament	Champions	Runners-up
November 7	Malaysia International; Kota Kinabalu, Malaysia; International Challenge $17,500 – 64MS/32WS/32MD/32WD/32XD; Draw|	(Indonesia) Panji Ahmad Maulana; 21–9, 16–21, 21–12	(Malaysia) Satheishtharan Ramachandran
November 7	Malaysia International; Kota Kinabalu, Malaysia; International Challenge $17,500 – 64MS/32WS/32MD/32WD/32XD; Draw|	(Japan) Sayaka Takahashi; 21–17, 21–11	(Malaysia) Ho Yen Mei
November 7	Malaysia International; Kota Kinabalu, Malaysia; International Challenge $17,500 – 64MS/32WS/32MD/32WD/32XD; Draw|	(Malaysia) Chooi Kah Ming (Malaysia) Low Juan Shen; 21–9, 21–13	(Chinese Taipei) Lu Ching-yao (Chinese Taipei) Yang Po-han
November 7	Malaysia International; Kota Kinabalu, Malaysia; International Challenge $17,500 – 64MS/32WS/32MD/32WD/32XD; Draw|	(Malaysia) Chow Mei Kuan (Malaysia) Lee Meng Yean; 21–17, 17–21, 21–15	(China) Jiang Binbin (China) Tang Pingyang
November 7	Malaysia International; Kota Kinabalu, Malaysia; International Challenge $17,500 – 64MS/32WS/32MD/32WD/32XD; Draw|	(Malaysia) Goh Soon Huat (Malaysia) Shevon Jemie Lai; 21–13, 21–17	(Chinese Taipei) Yang Po-hsuan (Chinese Taipei) Wen Hao-yun
November 7	World Junior Championships; Bilbao, Spain; BWF Major Event; 256MS/256WS/128MD/128WD/256XD; Draw	(China) Sun Feixiang; 21–19, 21–12	(Indonesia) Chico Aura Dwi Wardoyo
November 7	World Junior Championships; Bilbao, Spain; BWF Major Event; 256MS/256WS/128MD/128WD/256XD; Draw	(China) Chen Yufei; 21–14, 21–17	(Thailand) Pornpawee Chochuwong
November 7	World Junior Championships; Bilbao, Spain; BWF Major Event; 256MS/256WS/128MD/128WD/256XD; Draw	(China) Han Chengkai (China) Zhou Haodong; 21–17, 21–14	(South Korea) Lee Hong-sub (South Korea) Lim Su-min
November 7	World Junior Championships; Bilbao, Spain; BWF Major Event; 256MS/256WS/128MD/128WD/256XD; Draw	(Japan) Sayaka Hobara (Japan) Nami Matsuyama; 25–23, 19–21, 21–14	(China) Du Yue (China) Xu Ya
November 7	World Junior Championships; Bilbao, Spain; BWF Major Event; 256MS/256WS/128MD/128WD/256XD; Draw	(China) He Jiting (China) Du Yue; 21–13, 21–15	(China) Zhou Haodong (China) Hu Yuxiang
November 14	China Open; Fuzhou, China; Superseries Premier $700,000 – 32MS/32WS/32MD/32WD/32XD; Draw	(Denmark) Jan Ø. Jørgensen; 22–20, 21–13	(China) Chen Long
November 14	China Open; Fuzhou, China; Superseries Premier $700,000 – 32MS/32WS/32MD/32WD/32XD; Draw	(India) P. V. Sindhu; 21–11, 17–21, 21–11	(China) Sun Yu
November 14	China Open; Fuzhou, China; Superseries Premier $700,000 – 32MS/32WS/32MD/32WD/32XD; Draw	(Indonesia) Marcus Fernaldi Gideon (Indonesia) Kevin Sanjaya Sukamuljo; 21–18, 22–20	(Denmark) Mathias Boe (Denmark) Carsten Mogensen
November 14	China Open; Fuzhou, China; Superseries Premier $700,000 – 32MS/32WS/32MD/32WD/32XD; Draw	(South Korea) Chang Ye-na (South Korea) Lee So-hee; 13–21, 21–14, 21–17	(China) Huang Dongping (China) Li Yinhui
November 14	China Open; Fuzhou, China; Superseries Premier $700,000 – 32MS/32WS/32MD/32WD/32XD; Draw	(Indonesia) Tontowi Ahmad (Indonesia) Liliyana Natsir; 21–13, 20–22, 21–16	(China) Zhang Nan (China) Li Yinhui
November 14	Suriname International; Paramaribo, Suriname; International Series $6,000 – 32MS/32WS/16MD/8WD/16XD	(Israel) Misha Zilberman; 21–14, 12–21, 21–12	(Belgium) Maxime Moreels
November 14	Suriname International; Paramaribo, Suriname; International Series $6,000 – 32MS/32WS/16MD/8WD/16XD	(Trinidad and Tobago) Solángel Guzmán; 24–26, 21–12, 21–5	(Barbados) Tamisha Williams
November 14	Suriname International; Paramaribo, Suriname; International Series $6,000 – 32MS/32WS/16MD/8WD/16XD	(Barbados) Cory Fanus (Barbados) Dakeil Thorpe; 21–16, 21–12	(Suriname) Alrick Toney (Suriname) Mitchel Wongsodikromo
November 14	Suriname International; Paramaribo, Suriname; International Series $6,000 – 32MS/32WS/16MD/8WD/16XD	(Trinidad and Tobago) Solángel Guzmán (Trinidad and Tobago) Jada Renales; 21–11, 21–9	(Suriname) Sherifa Jameson (Suriname) Anjali Paragsingh
November 14	Suriname International; Paramaribo, Suriname; International Series $6,000 – 32MS/32WS/16MD/8WD/16XD	(Israel) Misha Zilberman (Israel) Svetlana Zilberman; 21–14 21–15	(Trinidad and Tobago) Alistair Espinoza (Trinidad and Tobago) Solángel Guzmán
November 14	Norwegian International; Sandefjord, Norway; International Series $6,000 – 32MS/32WS/32MD/32WD/32XD	(Finland) Kalle Koljonen; 21–19, 21–13	(Denmark) Kasper Dinesen
November 14	Norwegian International; Sandefjord, Norway; International Series $6,000 – 32MS/32WS/32MD/32WD/32XD	(Malaysia) Yap Rui Chen; 21–13, 21–8	(Mauritius) Kate Foo Kune
November 14	Norwegian International; Sandefjord, Norway; International Series $6,000 – 32MS/32WS/32MD/32WD/32XD	(New Zealand) Oliver Leydon-Davis (Denmark) Lasse Mølhede; 21–18, 22–20	(India) Akshay Dewalkar (India) Tarun Kona
November 14	Norwegian International; Sandefjord, Norway; International Series $6,000 – 32MS/32WS/32MD/32WD/32XD	(Denmark) Julie Finne-Ipsen (Denmark) Rikke Søby Hansen; 21–16, 21–14	(Denmark) Anne Katrine Hansen (Denmark) Marie Louise Steffensen
November 14	Norwegian International; Sandefjord, Norway; International Series $6,000 – 32MS/32WS/32MD/32WD/32XD	(Finland) Anton Kaisti (Finland) Jenny Nyström; 21–12, 21–12	(Denmark) Mathias Bay-Smidt (Denmark) Alexandra Bøje
November 21	Hong Kong Open; Kowloon, Hong Kong; Super Series $400,000 – 32MS/32WS/32MD/32WD/32XD; Draw	(Hong Kong) Ng Ka Long; 21–14, 10–21, 21–11	(India) Sameer Verma
November 21	Hong Kong Open; Kowloon, Hong Kong; Super Series $400,000 – 32MS/32WS/32MD/32WD/32XD; Draw	(Chinese Taipei) Tai Tzu-ying; 21–15, 21–17	(India) P. V. Sindhu
November 21	Hong Kong Open; Kowloon, Hong Kong; Super Series $400,000 – 32MS/32WS/32MD/32WD/32XD; Draw	(Japan) Takeshi Kamura (Japan) Keigo Sonoda; 21–19, 21–19	(Denmark) Mathias Boe (Denmark) Carsten Mogensen
November 21	Hong Kong Open; Kowloon, Hong Kong; Super Series $400,000 – 32MS/32WS/32MD/32WD/32XD; Draw	(Denmark) Christinna Pedersen (Denmark) Kamilla Rytter Juhl; 21–19, 21–10	(China) Huang Dongping (China) Li Yinhui
November 21	Hong Kong Open; Kowloon, Hong Kong; Super Series $400,000 – 32MS/32WS/32MD/32WD/32XD; Draw	(Indonesia) Tontowi Ahmad (Indonesia) Liliyana Natsir; 21–19, 21–17	(Indonesia) Praveen Jordan (Indonesia) Debby Susanto
November 21	Scottish Open; Glasgow, Scotland; Grand Prix $55,000 – 64MS/32WS/32MD/32WD/32XD; Draw	(Denmark) Anders Antonsen; 22–20, 21–15	(Malaysia) Soong Joo Ven
November 21	Scottish Open; Glasgow, Scotland; Grand Prix $55,000 – 64MS/32WS/32MD/32WD/32XD; Draw	(Denmark) Mette Poulsen; 21–18, 17–21, 21–14	(Switzerland) Sabrina Jaquet
November 21	Scottish Open; Glasgow, Scotland; Grand Prix $55,000 – 64MS/32WS/32MD/32WD/32XD; Draw	(Denmark) Mathias Christiansen (Denmark) David Daugaard; 15–21, 21–19, 21–15	(Scotland) Adam Hall (England) Peter Mills
November 21	Scottish Open; Glasgow, Scotland; Grand Prix $55,000 – 64MS/32WS/32MD/32WD/32XD; Draw	(Malaysia) Lim Yin Loo (Malaysia) Yap Cheng Wen; 21–17, 21–13	(Malaysia) Amelia Alicia Anscelly (Malaysia) Teoh Mei Xing
November 21	Scottish Open; Glasgow, Scotland; Grand Prix $55,000 – 64MS/32WS/32MD/32WD/32XD; Draw	(Malaysia) Goh Soon Huat (Malaysia) Shevon Jemie Lai; 13–21, 21–18, 21–16	(India) Pranaav Jerry Chopra (India) N. Sikki Reddy
November 21	India International Series; Hyderabad, India; International Series $6,000 – 64MS/64WS/32MD/32WD/32XD	(India) Lakshya Sen; 11–13, 11–3, 11–6, 11–6	(Malaysia) Lee Zii Jia
November 21	India International Series; Hyderabad, India; International Series $6,000 – 64MS/64WS/32MD/32WD/32XD	(India) Rituparna Das; 11–7, 8–11, 11–7, 14–12	(India) Gadde Ruthvika Shivani
November 21	India International Series; Hyderabad, India; International Series $6,000 – 64MS/64WS/32MD/32WD/32XD	(India) Satwiksairaj Rankireddy (India) Chirag Shetty; 8–11, 11–5, 7–11, 11–8, 11–5	(Malaysia) Goh Sze Fei (Malaysia) Nur Izzuddin
November 21	India International Series; Hyderabad, India; International Series $6,000 – 64MS/64WS/32MD/32WD/32XD	(Malaysia) Goh Yea Ching (Malaysia) Lim Chiew Sien; 11–6, 11–7, 6–11, 11–7	(Malaysia) Joyce Choong (Malaysia) Lim Jee Lynn
November 21	India International Series; Hyderabad, India; International Series $6,000 – 64MS/64WS/32MD/32WD/32XD	(India) Satwiksairaj Rankireddy (India) K. Maneesha; 5–11, 11–8, 12–10, 11–8	(Malaysia) Low Hang Yee (Malaysia) Cheah Yee See
November 21	Zambia International; Lusaka, Zambia; International Series $6,000 – 32MS/32WS/16MD/8WD/32XD	(Belgium) Maxime Moreels; 21–12, 20–22, 21–16	(Mauritius) Julien Paul
November 21	Zambia International; Lusaka, Zambia; International Series $6,000 – 32MS/32WS/16MD/8WD/32XD	(Egypt) Menna El-Tanany; 21–13, 21–17	(Zambia) Ogar Siamupangila
November 21	Zambia International; Lusaka, Zambia; International Series $6,000 – 32MS/32WS/16MD/8WD/32XD	(Mauritius) Aatish Lubah (Mauritius) Julien Paul; 15–21, 21–16, 21–18	(Egypt) Abdelrahman Abdelhakim (Egypt) Ahmed Salah
November 21	Zambia International; Lusaka, Zambia; International Series $6,000 – 32MS/32WS/16MD/8WD/32XD	(Zambia) Evelyn Siamupangila (Zambia) Ogar Siamupangila; Walkover	(Zambia) Elizaberth Chipeleme (Zambia) Ngandwe Miyambo
November 21	Zambia International; Lusaka, Zambia; International Series $6,000 – 32MS/32WS/16MD/8WD/32XD	(Egypt) Ahmed Salah (Egypt) Menna El-Tanany; 21–7, 15–21, 21–18	(Zambia) Juma Muwowo (Zambia) Ogar Siamupangila
November 21	Finnish International; Helsinki, Finland; International Series $6,000 – 32MS/32WS/32MD/32WD/32XD	(Denmark) Victor Svendsen; 11–7, 11–7, 8–11, 10–12, 11–4	(Finland) Kalle Koljonen
November 21	Finnish International; Helsinki, Finland; International Series $6,000 – 32MS/32WS/32MD/32WD/32XD	(Denmark) Irina Amalie Andersen; 5–11, 11–8, 7–11, 11–6, 11–7	(Denmark) Sofie Holmboe Dahl
November 21	Finnish International; Helsinki, Finland; International Series $6,000 – 32MS/32WS/32MD/32WD/32XD	(Denmark) Jeppe Bay (Denmark) Rasmus Kjær; 11–8, 11–2, 11–4	(Poland) Łukasz Moreń (Poland) Wojciech Szkudlarczyk
November 21	Finnish International; Helsinki, Finland; International Series $6,000 – 32MS/32WS/32MD/32WD/32XD	(Denmark) Irina Amalie Andersen (Denmark) Julie Dawall Jakobsen; 11–8, 7–11, 11–3, 11–9	(Denmark) Camilla Martens (Slovakia) Martina Repiská
November 21	Finnish International; Helsinki, Finland; International Series $6,000 – 32MS/32WS/32MD/32WD/32XD	(Finland) Anton Kaisti (Finland) Jenny Nyström; 11–6, 12–14, 11–7, 15–13	(Denmark) Philip Seerup (Denmark) Irina Amalie Andersen
November 28	Macau Open; Macau; Grand Prix Gold $120,000 – 64MS/32WS/32MD/32WD/32XD; Draw	(China) Zhao Junpeng; 21–11, 21–19	(Chinese Taipei) Chou Tien-chen
November 28	Macau Open; Macau; Grand Prix Gold $120,000 – 64MS/32WS/32MD/32WD/32XD; Draw	(China) Chen Yufei; 21–13, 21–18	(China) Chen Xiaoxin
November 28	Macau Open; Macau; Grand Prix Gold $120,000 – 64MS/32WS/32MD/32WD/32XD; Draw	(Chinese Taipei) Lee Jhe-huei (Chinese Taipei) Lee Yang; 17–21, 21–18, 21–19	(China) Lu Kai (China) Zhang Nan
November 28	Macau Open; Macau; Grand Prix Gold $120,000 – 64MS/32WS/32MD/32WD/32XD; Draw	(China) Chen Qingchen (China) Jia Yifan; 21–15, 21–13	(Indonesia) Anggia Shitta Awanda (Indonesia) Ni Ketut Mahadewi Istarani
November 28	Macau Open; Macau; Grand Prix Gold $120,000 – 64MS/32WS/32MD/32WD/32XD; Draw	(China) Zhang Nan (China) Li Yinhui; 21–19, 21–15	(Hong Kong) Tang Chun Man (Hong Kong) Tse Ying Suet
November 28	Welsh International; Cardiff, Wales; International Challenge $17,500 – 32MS/32WS/32MD/32WD/32XD	(Spain) Pablo Abián; 21–16, 21–16	(Scotland) Kieran Merrilees
November 28	Welsh International; Cardiff, Wales; International Challenge $17,500 – 32MS/32WS/32MD/32WD/32XD	(Spain) Beatriz Corrales; 21–16, 7–21, 21–19	(Chinese Taipei) Sung Shou-yun
November 28	Welsh International; Cardiff, Wales; International Challenge $17,500 – 32MS/32WS/32MD/32WD/32XD	(Chinese Taipei) Liao Min-chun (Chinese Taipei) Su Cheng-heng; 21–19, 21–13	(Chinese Taipei) Liao Kuan-hao (Chinese Taipei) Lu Chia-pin
November 28	Welsh International; Cardiff, Wales; International Challenge $17,500 – 32MS/32WS/32MD/32WD/32XD	(Russia) Anastasia Chervyakova (Russia) Olga Morozova; 21–16, 21–11	(India) Ashwini Ponnappa (India) N. Sikki Reddy
November 28	Welsh International; Cardiff, Wales; International Challenge $17,500 – 32MS/32WS/32MD/32WD/32XD	(Poland) Robert Mateusiak (Poland) Nadieżda Zięba; 21–16, 11–21, 21–18	(Malaysia) Goh Soon Huat (Malaysia) Lai Shevon Jemie
November 28	Tata Open India International Challenge; Mumbai, India; International Challenge $17,500 – 32MS/32WS/16MD/16WD/16XD; Draw	(Indonesia) Enzi Shafira; 7–11, 11–9, 11–7, 11–6	(Malaysia) Lim Chi Wing
November 28	Tata Open India International Challenge; Mumbai, India; International Challenge $17,500 – 32MS/32WS/16MD/16WD/16XD; Draw	(Malaysia) Soniia Cheah; 11-3, 6–11, 11–6, 11–7	(India) Pardeshi Shreyanshi
November 28	Tata Open India International Challenge; Mumbai, India; International Challenge $17,500 – 32MS/32WS/16MD/16WD/16XD; Draw	(India) Satwiksairaj Rankireddy (India) Chirag Shetty; 10–12, 11–9, 11–7, 11–5	(India) Arjun M. R. (India) Ramchandran Shlok
November 28	Tata Open India International Challenge; Mumbai, India; International Challenge $17,500 – 32MS/32WS/16MD/16WD/16XD; Draw	(Indonesia) Mychelle Crhystine Bandaso (Indonesia) Serena Kani; 11–8, 8–11, 2–11, 11–9, 11–7	(Indonesia) Maretha Dea Giovani (Indonesia) Tania Oktaviani Kusumah
November 28	Tata Open India International Challenge; Mumbai, India; International Challenge $17,500 – 32MS/32WS/16MD/16WD/16XD; Draw	(Indonesia) Fachryza Abimanyu (Indonesia) Bunga Fitriani Romadhini; 11–5 12–10 4–11 6–11 11–8	(India) Vighnesh Devlekar (India) Kuhoo Garg
November 28	South Africa International; Benoni, South Africa; International Series $6,000 – 32MS/32WS/16MD/8WD/16XD	(South Africa) Jacob Maliekal; 21–5, 21–13	(Russia) Anatoliy Yartsev
November 28	South Africa International; Benoni, South Africa; International Series $6,000 – 32MS/32WS/16MD/8WD/16XD	(Russia) Evgeniya Kosetskaya; 21–8, 21–10	(Egypt) Hadia Hosny
November 28	South Africa International; Benoni, South Africa; International Series $6,000 – 32MS/32WS/16MD/8WD/16XD	(Egypt) Abdelrahman Abdelhakim (Egypt) Ahmed Salah; 21–16, 22–20	(South Africa) Matthew Michel (South Africa) Prakash Vijayanath
November 28	South Africa International; Benoni, South Africa; International Series $6,000 – 32MS/32WS/16MD/8WD/16XD	(South Africa) Michelle Butler-Emmett (South Africa) Jennifer Fry; 21–15, 21–16	(South Africa) Elme de Villiers (South Africa) Sandra le Grange
November 28	South Africa International; Benoni, South Africa; International Series $6,000 – 32MS/32WS/16MD/8WD/16XD	(Russia) Anatoliy Yartsev (Russia) Evgeniya Kosetskaya; 21–13, 21–9	(South Africa) Andries Malan (South Africa) Sandra le Grange

=== December ===
Week of	Tournament	Champions	Runners-up
December 5	Korea Masters; Seogwipo, South Korea; Grand Prix Gold $120,000 – 64MS/32WS/32MD/32WD/32XD; Draw	(South Korea) Son Wan-ho; 21–13, 21–16	(Malaysia) Liew Daren
December 5	Korea Masters; Seogwipo, South Korea; Grand Prix Gold $120,000 – 64MS/32WS/32MD/32WD/32XD; Draw	(South Korea) Sung Ji-hyun; 21–8, 21–10	(South Korea) Lee Jang-mi
December 5	Korea Masters; Seogwipo, South Korea; Grand Prix Gold $120,000 – 64MS/32WS/32MD/32WD/32XD; Draw	(South Korea) Kim Jae-hwan (South Korea) Ko Sung-hyun; 21–19, 21–18	(Chinese Taipei) Lee Jhe-huei (Chinese Taipei) Lee Yang
December 5	Korea Masters; Seogwipo, South Korea; Grand Prix Gold $120,000 – 64MS/32WS/32MD/32WD/32XD; Draw	(South Korea) Jung Kyung-eun (South Korea) Shin Seung-chan; 21–14, 21–14	(South Korea) Chae Yoo-jung (South Korea) Kim So-yeong
December 5	Korea Masters; Seogwipo, South Korea; Grand Prix Gold $120,000 – 64MS/32WS/32MD/32WD/32XD; Draw	(South Korea) Ko Sung-hyun (South Korea) Kim Ha-na; 21–19, 21–16	(Thailand) Dechapol Puavaranukroh (Thailand) Sapsiree Taerattanachai
December 5	Bangladesh International; Dhaka, Bangladesh; International Challenge $17,500 – 64MS/32WS/32MD/16WD/32XD	(India) Abhishek Yelegar; 21–17, 21–17	(India) Shreyansh Jaiswal
December 5	Bangladesh International; Dhaka, Bangladesh; International Challenge $17,500 – 64MS/32WS/32MD/16WD/32XD	(Vietnam) Vũ Thị Trang; 21–18, 21–13	(Vietnam) Nguyen Thuy Linh
December 5	Bangladesh International; Dhaka, Bangladesh; International Challenge $17,500 – 64MS/32WS/32MD/16WD/32XD	(India) Satwiksairaj Rankireddy (India) Chirag Shetty; 17–21, 21–7, 21–8	(India) M. Anilkumar Raju (India) Venkat Gaurav Prasad
December 5	Bangladesh International; Dhaka, Bangladesh; International Challenge $17,500 – 64MS/32WS/32MD/16WD/32XD	(Vietnam) Nguyễn Thị Sen (Vietnam) Vũ Thị Trang; 21–6, 20–22, 21–11	(India) Meghana Jakkampudi (India) Poorvisha S Ram
December 5	Bangladesh International; Dhaka, Bangladesh; International Challenge $17,500 – 64MS/32WS/32MD/16WD/32XD	(India) Satwiksairaj Rankireddy (India) K. Maneesha; 21–12, 21–12	(Thailand) Tanupat Viriyangkura (Thailand) Thanyasuda Wongya
December 5	Irish Open; Dublin, Ireland; International Challenge $17,500 – 32MS/32WS/32MD/32WD/32XD	(Germany) Fabian Roth; 22–20, 9–21, 21–15	(Republic of Ireland) Scott Evans
December 5	Irish Open; Dublin, Ireland; International Challenge $17,500 – 32MS/32WS/32MD/32WD/32XD	(Denmark) Line Kjærsfeldt; 21–18, 21–18	(Chinese Taipei) Sung Shuo-yun
December 5	Irish Open; Dublin, Ireland; International Challenge $17,500 – 32MS/32WS/32MD/32WD/32XD	(Germany) Jones Ralfy Jansen (Germany) Josche Zurwonne; 27–25, 23–21	(Chinese Taipei) Liao Min-chun (Chinese Taipei) Su Cheng-heng
December 5	Irish Open; Dublin, Ireland; International Challenge $17,500 – 32MS/32WS/32MD/32WD/32XD	(France) Émilie Lefel (France) Anne Tran; 24–22, 21–18	(Denmark) Julie Finne-Ipsen (Denmark) Rikke Søby Hansen
December 5	Irish Open; Dublin, Ireland; International Challenge $17,500 – 32MS/32WS/32MD/32WD/32XD	(Denmark) Mathias Christiansen (Denmark) Sara Thygesen; 21–16, 21–16	(Netherlands) Robin Tabeling (Netherlands) Cheryl Seinen
December 5	Botswana International; Lobatse, Botswana; International Series $6,000 – 32MS/32WS/16MD/8WD/16XD	(Russia) Anatoliy Yartsev; 21–10, 21–18	(South Africa) Jacob Maliekal
December 5	Botswana International; Lobatse, Botswana; International Series $6,000 – 32MS/32WS/16MD/8WD/16XD	(Russia) Evgeniya Kosetskaya; 21–8, 21–13	(Egypt) Hadia Hosny
December 5	Botswana International; Lobatse, Botswana; International Series $6,000 – 32MS/32WS/16MD/8WD/16XD	(India) Alwin Francis (India) Tarun Kona; 21–12, 21–19	(Mauritius) Aatish Lubah (Mauritius) Julien Paul
December 5	Botswana International; Lobatse, Botswana; International Series $6,000 – 32MS/32WS/16MD/8WD/16XD	(Egypt) Doha Hany (Egypt) Hadia Hosny; 21–16, 21–17	(Zambia) Evelyn Siamupangila (Zambia) Ogar Siamupangila
December 5	Botswana International; Lobatse, Botswana; International Series $6,000 – 32MS/32WS/16MD/8WD/16XD	(Russia) Anatoliy Yartsev (Russia) Evgeniya Kosetskaya; 21–12, 21–10	(Mauritius) Julien Paul (Egypt) Hadia Hosny
December 12	BWF Destination Dubai World Super Series Finals; Dubai, UAE; BWF Super Series Finals $1,000,000 – 8MS (RR)/8WS (RR)/8MD (RR)/8WD (RR)/8XD (RR); Draw	(Denmark) Viktor Axelsen; 21–14, 6–21, 21–17	(China) Tian Houwei
December 12	BWF Destination Dubai World Super Series Finals; Dubai, UAE; BWF Super Series Finals $1,000,000 – 8MS (RR)/8WS (RR)/8MD (RR)/8WD (RR)/8XD (RR); Draw	(Chinese Taipei) Tai Tzu-ying; 21–14, 21–13	(South Korea) Sung Ji-hyun
December 12	BWF Destination Dubai World Super Series Finals; Dubai, UAE; BWF Super Series Finals $1,000,000 – 8MS (RR)/8WS (RR)/8MD (RR)/8WD (RR)/8XD (RR); Draw	(Malaysia) Goh V Shem (Malaysia) Tan Wee Kiong; 21–14, 21–19	(Japan) Takeshi Kamura (Japan) Keigo Sonoda
December 12	BWF Destination Dubai World Super Series Finals; Dubai, UAE; BWF Super Series Finals $1,000,000 – 8MS (RR)/8WS (RR)/8MD (RR)/8WD (RR)/8XD (RR); Draw	(China) Chen Qingchen (China) Jia Yifan; 21–15, 13–21, 21–17	(Japan) Misaki Matsutomo (Japan) Ayaka Takahashi
December 12	BWF Destination Dubai World Super Series Finals; Dubai, UAE; BWF Super Series Finals $1,000,000 – 8MS (RR)/8WS (RR)/8MD (RR)/8WD (RR)/8XD (RR); Draw	(China) Zheng Siwei (China) Chen Qingchen; 21–12, 21–12	(England) Chris Adcock (England) Gabby Adcock
December 12	Italian International; Ostia Lido, Italy; International Challenge $17,500 – 32MS/32WS/32MD/32WD/32XD	(Sweden) Henri Hurskainen; 22–20, 21–13	(Italy) Indra Bagus Ade Chandra
December 12	Italian International; Ostia Lido, Italy; International Challenge $17,500 – 32MS/32WS/32MD/32WD/32XD	(Switzerland) Sabrina Jaquet; 22–20, 21–14	(Spain) Clara Azurmendi
December 12	Italian International; Ostia Lido, Italy; International Challenge $17,500 – 32MS/32WS/32MD/32WD/32XD	(Germany) Jones Ralfy Jansen (Germany) Josche Zurwonne; 21–17, 21–18	(Sweden) Richard Eidestedt (Sweden) Nico Ruponen
December 12	Italian International; Ostia Lido, Italy; International Challenge $17,500 – 32MS/32WS/32MD/32WD/32XD	(Russia) Anastasia Chervyakova (Russia) Olga Morozova; 21–18, 21–17	(Bulgaria) Mariya Mitsova (Bulgaria) Petya Nedelcheva
December 12	Italian International; Ostia Lido, Italy; International Challenge $17,500 – 32MS/32WS/32MD/32WD/32XD	(France) Jordan Corvee (France) Anne Tran; 21–13, 17–21, 21–17	(Chinese Taipei) Chang Ko-chi (Chinese Taipei) Chang Hsin-tien
December 12	Yonex / K&D Graphics International; Orange, United States; International Challenge $17,500 – 64MS/32WS/32MD/8WD/32XD	(Japan) Riichi Takeshita; 21–13, 21–18	(Russia) Sergey Sirant
December 12	Yonex / K&D Graphics International; Orange, United States; International Challenge $17,500 – 64MS/32WS/32MD/8WD/32XD	(United States) Beiwen Zhang; 21–13, 21–12	(Canada) Rachel Honderich
December 12	Yonex / K&D Graphics International; Orange, United States; International Challenge $17,500 – 64MS/32WS/32MD/8WD/32XD	(Denmark) Frederik Colberg (Denmark) Rasmus Fladberg; 21–8, 18–21, 21–6	(Canada) B. R. Sankeerth (Canada) Nyl Yakura
December 12	Yonex / K&D Graphics International; Orange, United States; International Challenge $17,500 – 64MS/32WS/32MD/8WD/32XD	(United States) Jing Yu Hong (United States) Beiwen Zhang; 21–17, 22–20	(United States) Eva Lee (United States) Paula Lynn Obanana
December 12	Yonex / K&D Graphics International; Orange, United States; International Challenge $17,500 – 64MS/32WS/32MD/8WD/32XD	(Russia) Evgenij Dremin (Russia) Evgenia Dimova; 21–6, 22–20	(United States) Howard Shu (United States) Jamie Subandhi
December 12	Nepal International Series; Kathmandu, Nepal; International Series $6,000 – 32MS/32WS/16MD/16WD/16XD	(India) Abhishek Yelegar; 21–16, 21–14	(India) Siddharath Thakur
December 12	Nepal International Series; Kathmandu, Nepal; International Series $6,000 – 32MS/32WS/16MD/16WD/16XD	(Vietnam) Nguyen Thuy Linh; 21–17, 21–16	(Indonesia) Devi Yunita Indah Sari
December 12	Nepal International Series; Kathmandu, Nepal; International Series $6,000 – 32MS/32WS/16MD/16WD/16XD	(India) Arjun M.R. (India) Ramchandran Shlok; 21–18, 21–15	(Pakistan) Rizwan Azam (Pakistan) Sulehri Kashif Ali
December 12	Nepal International Series; Kathmandu, Nepal; International Series $6,000 – 32MS/32WS/16MD/16WD/16XD	(India) Meghana Jakkampudi (India) Poorvisha S Ram; 21–16, 21–12	(India) Anoushka Parikh (India) Harika Veludurthi
December 12	Nepal International Series; Kathmandu, Nepal; International Series $6,000 – 32MS/32WS/16MD/16WD/16XD	(India) Saurabh Sharma (India) Anoushka Parikh; 14–21, 21–19, 21–19	(India) Venkat Gaurav Prasad (India) Juhi Dewangan
December 19	Turkey International; Istanbul, Turkey; International Series $6,000 – 64MS/32WS/32MD/32WD/32XD	(Denmark) Patrick Bjerregaard; 21–19, 21–16	(Hungary) Gergely Krausz
December 19	Turkey International; Istanbul, Turkey; International Series $6,000 – 64MS/32WS/32MD/32WD/32XD	(Turkey) Cemre Fere; 14–21, 21–16, 21–12	(Spain) Clara Azurmendi
December 19	Turkey International; Istanbul, Turkey; International Series $6,000 – 64MS/32WS/32MD/32WD/32XD	(France) Vanmael Heriau (France) Florent Riancho; 21–10, 18–21, 21–11	(Poland) Pawel Pradzinski (Poland) Jan Rudzinski
December 19	Turkey International; Istanbul, Turkey; International Series $6,000 – 64MS/32WS/32MD/32WD/32XD	(Turkey) Ozge Bayrak (Turkey) Neslihan Yigit; 21–14, 21–16	(Turkey) Kader Inal (Turkey) Fatma Nur Yavuz
December 19	Turkey International; Istanbul, Turkey; International Series $6,000 – 64MS/32WS/32MD/32WD/32XD	(Turkey) Melih Turgut (Turkey) Fatma Nur Yavuz; 21–19, 21–14	(Russia) Rodion Alimov (Russia) Alina Davletova

== See also ==
- BWF World Ranking
