= 2016 Russia Open Grand Prix =

Russian Open Grand Prix 2016
Tournament details
- Dates: 4 – 9 October 2016
- Level: Grand Prix
- Total prize money: US$55,000
- Venue: Sports Hall Olympic
- Location: Vladivostok, Russia

Champions
- Men's singles: (Malaysia) Zulfadli Zulkiffli
- Women's singles: (India) Gadde Ruthvika Shivani
- Men's doubles: (Russia) Vladimir Ivanov (Russia) Ivan Sozonov
- Women's doubles: (Russia) Anastasia Chervyakova (Russia) Olga Morozova
- Mixed doubles: (India) Pranaav Jerry Chopra (India) N. Sikki Reddy

The 2016 Russia Open Grand Prix is the 15th Grand Prix Gold and Grand Prix tournament of the 2016 BWF Grand Prix Gold and Grand Prix. The tournament was held in Sports Hall Olympic, Vladivostok, Russia from October 4 until October 9, 2016, and had a total purse of 55,000.

== Men's singles ==
=== Seeds ===
1. (Malaysia) Zulfadli Zulkiffli (champion)
2. (France) Brice Leverdez (second round)
3. (Israel) Misha Zilberman (second round)
4. (Russia) Vladimir Malkov (semifinals)
5. (Ukraine) Artem Pochtarev (quarterfinals)
6. (India) Sourabh Varma (withdrew)
7. (Russia) Sergey Sirant (quarterfinals)
8. (Malaysia) Zulhelmi Zulkiffli (quarterfinals)

=== Finals ===
Semifinals
1	(Malaysia) Zulfadli Zulkiffli	21	21
4	(Russia) Vladimir Malkov	17	18
(India) Siril Verma	24	21
(Russia) Anatoliy Yartsev	22	16

Final
1	(Malaysia) Zulfadli Zulkiffli	16	21	21
(India) Siril Verma	21	19	10

=== Top half ===
==== Section 1 ====
First Round
1	(Malaysia) Z Zukkiffli	21	21
(Russia) P Kotsarenko	9	2
(Russia) A Karpov	21	21
(Russia) E Efanov	14	6
6	(India) S Verma
(Russia) A Zolotuev	w	/	o
(Russia) A Butovetstkiy	w	/	o
(Japan) R Maruo

Second Round
1	(Malaysia) Z Zukkiffli	21	21
(Russia) A Karpov	10	10
(Russia) A Zolotuev	5	16
(Russia) A Butovetstkiy	21	21

Quarterfinal
1	(Malaysia) Z Zukkiffli	21	21
(Russia) A Butovetstkiy	12	8

==== Section 2 ====
First Round
4	(Russia) V Malkov	21	21
(Russia) K Timofeev	16	12
(England) Wong H S	13	21	21
(Russia) D Riabov	21	19	14
5	(Ukraine) A Pochtarev	21	21
(Russia) E Mikhail	17	14
(Russia) S Iakovlev	16	15
(Azerbaijan) O Qalandarov	21	21

Second Round
4	(Russia) V Malkov	21	21
(England) Wong H S	14	17
5	(Ukraine) A Pochtarev	21	21
(Azerbaijan) O Qalandarov	16	14

Quarterfinals
4	(Russia) V Malkov	21	16
5	(Ukraine) A Pochtarev	18	16^{r}

=== Bottom half ===
==== Section 3 ====
First Round
(Russia) R Alimov	21	21
(Russia) V Shipilenko	17	17
(Russia) A Parakhodin	18	15
8	(Malaysia) Z Zukkiffli	21	21
(Russia) A Jdanov	7	11
(India) S Verma	21	21
(Russia) V Rusin	13	22	10
3	(Israel) M Zilberman	21	20	21

Second Round
(Russia) R Alimov	14	12
8	(Malaysia) Z Zukkiffli	21	21
(India) S Verma	21	21
3	(Israel) M Zilberman	15	9

Quarterfinals
8	(Malaysia) Z Zukkiffli	12	18
(India) S Verma	21	21

==== Section 4 ====
First Round
(Russia) D Grachev	w	/	o
(Japan) K Horiuchi
(Russia) S Gulomzoda	9	9
7	(Russia) S Sirant	21	21
(Russia) A Yartsev	21	21
(Azerbaijan) K Rzayev	4	9
(Russia) D Klimenko	9	16
2	(France) B Leverdez	21	21

Second Round
(Russia) D Grachev	17	13
7	(Russia) S Sirant	21	21
(Russia) A Yartsev	21	21
2	(France) B Leverdez	16	19

Quarterfinal
7	(Russia) S Sirant	18	13
(Russia) A Yartsev	21	21

== Women's singles ==
=== Seeds ===
1. (Russia) Natalia Perminova (semifinals)
2. (Russia) Ksenia Polikarpova (semifinals)
3. (India) Tanvi Lad (quarterfinals)
4. (India) Gadde Ruthvika Shivani (champion)

=== Finals ===
Semifinals
1	(Russia) Natalia Perminova	21	16	8
(Russia) Evgeniya Kosetskaya	19	21	21
4	(India) Gadde Ruthvika Shivani	22	21
2	(Russia) Ksenia Polikarpova	20	13

Final
(Russia) Evgeniya Kosetskaya	10	13
4	(India) Gadde Ruthvika Shivani	21	21

=== Top half ===
==== Section 1 ====
First Round
1	(Russia) N Perminova
BYE
(Azerbaijan) H Zulfiyya	9	5
(Russia) J Zapolskaya	21	21
(Russia) L Minadze
BYE
(Russia) E Pyatina	21	21
(Russia) D Serebriakova	12	15

Second Round
1	(Russia) N Perminova	21	21
(Russia) J Zapolskaya	11	7
(Russia) L Minadze	13	11
(Russia) E Pyatina	21	21

Quarterfinals
1	(Russia) N Perminova	21	21
(Russia) E Pyatina	11	19

==== Section 2 ====
First Round
3	(India) T Lad
BYE
(Russia) V Dereviyagina	17	14
(Russia) E Kut	21	21
(Russia) E Kosetskaya	12	30	21
(Russia) V Slobodyanyuk	21	28	8
(Russia) E Bolotova	21	15	21
(Russia) O Kister	17	21	12

Second Round
3	(India) T Lad	21	21
(Russia) E Kut	10	13
(Russia) E Kosetskaya	20	21	21
(Russia) E Bolotova	22	8	16

Quarterfinals
3	(India) T Lad	16	19
(Russia) E Kosetskaya	21	21

=== Bottom half ===
==== Section 3 ====
First Round
(Azerbaijan) A Mehdiyeva	5	4
(Russia) L Abibulaeva	21	21
(Russia) D Radchenko	13	9
(Russia) E Komendrovskaja	21	21
(Russia) A Sharapova	5	9
(India) A Pantawane	21	21
BYE
4	(India) R S Gadde

Second Round
(Russia) L Abibulaeva	15	16
(Russia) E Komendrovskaja	21	21
(India) A Pantawane	9	10
4	(India) R S Gadde	21	21

Quarterfinals
(Russia) E Komendrovskaja	21	10	17
4	(India) R S Gadde	13	21	21

==== Section 4 ====
First Round
(Russia) P Makogonova	11	10
(Russia) A Semenova	21	21
BYE
(Russia) E Tarasova
(Russia) K Evgenova	21	21
(Russia) S Doroshenko	10	14
BYE
2	(Russia) K Polikarpova

Second Round
(Russia) A Semenova	21	19	21
(Russia) E Tarasova	19	21	18
(Russia) K Evgenova	8	8
2	(Russia) K Polikarpova	21	21

Quarterfinals
(Russia) A Semenova	12	21	19
2	(Russia) K Polikarpova	21	14	21

== Men's doubles ==
=== Seeds ===
1. (Russia) Vladimir Ivanov / Ivan Sozonov (champion)
2. (Russia) Konstantin Abramov / Alexandr Zinchenko (final)
3. (Ukraine) Gennadiy Natarov / Artem Pochtarev (first round)
4. (Azerbaijan) Orkhan Qalandarov / Kanan Rzayev (first round)

=== Finals ===
Semifinals
1	(Russia) Vladimir Ivanov (Russia) Ivan Sozonov	21	21
(Russia) Evgenij Dremin (Russia) Denis Grachev	19	12
(Russia) Rodion Alimov (Russia) Pavel Kotsarenko	8	13
2	(Russia) Konstantin Abramov (Russia) Alexandr Zinchenko	21	21

Final
1	(Russia) Vladimir Ivanov (Russia) Ivan Sozonov	21	21
2	(Russia) Konstantin Abramov (Russia) Alexandr Zinchenko	15	14

=== Top half ===
==== Section 1 ====
First Round
1	(Russia) V Ivanov (Russia) I Sozonov	21	21
(Russia) V Rusin (Russia) I Zhdanov	18	11
(Russia) N Khakimov (Russia) A Yartsev	21	21
(Russia) S Gulomzoda (Russia) E Mikhail	12	13
3	(Ukraine) G Natarov (Ukraine) A Pochtarev	12	19
(Russia) E Dremin (Russia) D Grachev	21	21
(Russia) R Dvornikov (Russia) A Zolotuev	21	20	21
(Russia) E Efanov (Russia) K Timofeev	17	22	15

Quarterfinals
1	(Russia) V Ivanov (Russia) I Sozonov	21	21
(Russia) N Khakimov (Russia) A Yartsev	13	12
(Russia) E Dremin (Russia) D Grachev	21	21
(Russia) R Dvornikov (Russia) A Zolotuev	16	12

Semifinals
1	(Russia) V Ivanov (Russia) I Sozonov	21	21
(Russia) E Dremin (Russia) D Grachev	19	12

=== Bottom half ===
==== Section 2 ====
First Round
(Russia) V Nikulov (Russia) A Serpionov
(Russia) R Alimov (Russia) P Kotsarenko	w	/	o
(Russia) V Malkov (Russia) S Sirant	21	21
4	(Azerbaijan) O Qalandarov (Azerbaijan) K Rzayev	16	16
(Russia) S Iakovlev (Russia) A Jdanov	w	/	o
(Japan) Y Tsukamoto (Japan) S Yamamura
(Russia) D Klimenko (Russia) V Shipilenko	5	8
2	(Russia) K Abramov (Russia) A Zinchenko	21	21

Quarterfinals
(Russia) R Alimov (Russia) P Kotsarenko	21	21
(Russia) V Malkov (Russia) S Sirant	14	18
(Russia) S Iakovlev (Russia) A Jdanov	7	8
2	(Russia) K Abramov (Russia) A Zinchenko	21	21

Semifinals
(Russia) R Alimov (Russia) P Kotsarenko	8	13
2	(Russia) K Abramov (Russia) A Zinchenko	21	21

== Women's doubles ==
=== Seeds ===
1. (Russia) Anastasia Chervyakova / Olga Morozova (champion)
2. (Russia) Ekaterina Kut / Daria Serebriakova (first round)

=== Finals ===
Semifinals
1	(Russia) Anastasia Chervyakova (Russia) Olga Morozova	21	21
(Russia) Tatjana Bibik (Russia) Elena Komendrovskaja	19	19
(Russia) Evgeniya Kosetskaya (Russia) Ksenia Polikarpova	21	21
(Russia) Natalia Perminova (Russia) Anastasiia Semenova	19	19

Final
1	(Russia) Anastasia Chervyakova (Russia) Olga Morozova	21	22
(Russia) Evgeniya Kosetskaya (Russia) Ksenia Polikarpova	14	20

=== Top half ===
==== Section 1 ====
First Round
1	(Russia) A Chervyakova (Russia) O Morozova
BYE
(Russia) Y Ignatyeva (Russia) K Virvich	21	19	21
(Russia) L Minadze (Russia) A Sharapova	18	21	16
(Russia) T Bibik (Russia) E Komendrovskaja	21	21
(Russia) E Dimova (Russia) V Sorokina	12	18
(Russia) V Slobodyanyuk (Russia) E Tarasova	21	16	12
(India) M Jakkampudi (India) P S Ram	12	21	21

Quarterfinals
1	(Russia) A Chervyakova (Russia) O Morozova	21	21
(Russia) Y Ignatyeva (Russia) K Virvich	8	8
(Russia) T Bibik (Russia) E Komendrovskaja	21	13	21
(India) M Jakkampudi (India) P S Ram	14	21	18

Semifinals
1	(Russia) A Chervyakova (Russia) O Morozova	21	21
(Russia) T Bibik (Russia) E Komendrovskaja	19	19

=== Bottom half ===
==== Section 2 ====
First Round
(Russia) S Doroshenko (Russia) P Makogonova	21	21
(Azerbaijan) A Mehdiyeva (Azerbaijan) H Zulfiyya	13	13
(Russia) V Makkoveeva (Russia) D Radchenko	8	10
(Russia) E Kosetskaya (Russia) K Polikarpova	21	21
(Russia) K Evgenova (Russia) M Shegurova	18	22	21
(Russia) E Bolotova (Russia) A Davletova	21	20	18
(Russia) N Perminova (Russia) A Semenova	21	20	21
2	(Russia) E Kut (Russia) D Serebriakova	18	22	18

Quarterfinals
(Russia) S Doroshenko (Russia) P Makogonova	10	6
(Russia) E Kosetskaya (Russia) K Polikarpova	21	21
(Russia) K Evgenova (Russia) M Shegurova	12	12^{r}
(Russia) N Perminova (Russia) A Semenova	21	17

Semifinal
(Russia) E Kosetskaya (Russia) K Polikarpova	21	21
(Russia) N Perminova (Russia) A Semenova	19	19

== Mixed doubles ==
=== Seeds ===
1. (Russia) Evgenij Dremin / Evgenia Dimova (semifinals)
2. (India) Pranaav Jerry Chopra / N. Sikki Reddy (champion)
3. (Russia) Alexandr Zinchenko / Olga Morozova (quarterfinals)
4. (Russia) Andrey Parakhodin / Anastasia Chervyakova (quarterfinals)

=== Finals ===
Semifinals
1	(Russia) Evgenij Dremin (Russia) Evgenia Dimova	13	19
(Russia) Vladimir Ivanov (Russia) Valeria Sorokina	21	21
(Russia) Anatoliy Yartsev (Russia) Evgeniya Kosetskaya	11	17
2	(India) Pranaav Jerry Chopra (India) N. Sikki Reddy	21	21

Final
(Russia) Vladimir Ivanov (Russia) Valeria Sorokina	17	19
2	(India) Pranaav Jerry Chopra (India) N. Sikki Reddy	21	21

=== Top half ===
==== Section 1 ====
First Round
1	(Russia) E Dremin (Russia) E Dimova
BYE
(Russia) V Shipilenko (Russia) V Makkoveeva	21	21
(Russia) D Klimenko (Russia) L Minadze	18	19
(Russia) I Zhdanov (Russia) K Evgenova
BYE
(Russia) R Alimov (Russia) A Davletova	21	21
(Russia) A Zolotuev (Russia) V Dereviyagina	10	9

Second Round
1	(Russia) E Dremin (Russia) E Dimova	21	17	21
(Russia) V Shipilenko (Russia) V Makkoveeva	19	21	14
(Russia) I Zhdanov (Russia) K Evgenova	10	19
(Russia) R Alimov (Russia) A Davletova	21	21

Quarterfinals
1	(Russia) E Dremin (Russia) E Dimova	21	21
(Russia) R Alimov (Russia) A Davletova	17	13

==== Section 2 ====
First Round
4	(Russia) A Parakhodin (Russia) A Chervyakova
BYE
(Russia) D Riabov (Russia) M Shegurova	21	17	26
(Russia) V Malkov (Russia) J Zapolskaya	14	21	24
(Russia) D Grachev (Russia) E Bolotova
BYE
(Russia) V Ivanov (Russia) V Sorokina	21	21
(Azerbaijan) O Qalandarov (Azerbaijan) H Zulfiyya	5	3

Second Round
4	(Russia) A Parakhodin (Russia) A Chervyakova	21	22
(Russia) D Riabov (Russia) M Shegurova	18	20
(Russia) D Grachev (Russia) E Bolotova	14	14
(Russia) V Ivanov (Russia) V Sorokina	21	21

Quarterfinals
4	(Russia) A Parakhodin (Russia) A Chervyakova	17	15
(Russia) V Ivanov (Russia) V Sorokina	21	21

=== Bottom half ===
==== Section 3 ====
First Round
(Russia) V Nikulov (Russia) D Serebriakova	21	21
(Russia) K Timofeev (Russia) P Makogonova	17	14
BYE
(Russia) A Yartsev (Russia) E Kosetskaya
(Russia) V Rusin (Russia) E Kut	21	21
(Azerbaijan) K Rzayev (Azerbaijan) A Mehdiyeva	6	11
BYE
3	(Russia) A Zinchenko (Russia) O Morozova

Second Round
(Russia) V Nikulov (Russia) D Serebriakova
(Russia) A Yartsev (Russia) E Kosetskaya	w	/	o
(Russia) V Rusin (Russia) E Kut	21	18	14
3	(Russia) A Zinchenko (Russia) O Morozova	16	21	21

Quarterfinals
(Russia) A Yartsev (Russia) E Kosetskaya	21	23	22
3	(Russia) A Zinchenko (Russia) O Morozova	16	25	20

==== Section 4 ====
First Round
(Russia) A Butovetstkiy (Russia) Y Ignatyeva	16	21	14
(Russia) A Vasilkin (Russia) K Virvich	21	19	21
BYE
(Russia) S Iakovlev (Russia) D Radchenko
(Russia) A Jdanov (Russia) O Kister	10	15
(Russia) A Serpionov (Russia) T Bibik	21	21
BYE
2	(India) P J Chopra (India) N. S Reddy

Second Round
(Russia) A Vasilkin (Russia) K Virvich	21	21
(Russia) S Iakovlev (Russia) D Radchenko	10	11
(Russia) A Serpionov (Russia) T Bibik	19	13
2	(India) P J Chopra (India) N. S Reddy	21	21

Quarterfinals
(Russia) A Vasilkin (Russia) K Virvich	10	8
2	(India) P J Chopra (India) N. S Reddy	21	21

Preceded by 2016 Thailand Open Grand Prix Gold	BWF Grand Prix and Grand Prix Gold; 2016 BWF Season	Succeeded by 2016 Chinese Taipei Masters Grand Prix
