= 2016 BWF Future Series =

The 2016 BWF Future Series was the 2016 season of the BWF Future Series.

== Schedule ==
Below is the schedule released by Badminton World Federation:

| Tour | Official title | Venue | City | Date | | Prize money USD | Report |
| Tour | Official title | Venue | City | Start | Finish | Prize money USD | Report |
|---|---|---|---|---|---|---|---|
| 1 | (Mauritius) Rose Hill International 2016 | | Rose Hill | February 11 | February 14 | | |
| 2 | (New Zealand) Waikato International 2016 | | Hamilton | March 17 | March 20 | | |
| 3 | Ivory Coast International 2016 | | Abidjan | March 31 | April 3 | | |
| 4 | (Croatia) Victor Croatian International 2016 | | | April 14 | April 17 | 1,500 | |
| 5 | YONEX Latvia International 2016 | | | June 2 | June 5 | | |
| 6 | (Lithuania) YONEX Lithuanian International 2016 | | | June 9 | June 12 | | |
| 7 | (Greece) Hellas International 2016 | | | June 30 | July 3 | | |
| 8 | (Aruba) Carebeco International 2016 | | Oranjestad | August 25 | August 28 | | |
| 9 | (Slovakia) YONEX Slovak Open 2016 | | Trenčín | September 1 | September 4 | | |
| 10 | (Bulgaria) Babolat Bulgarian International 2016 | | Sofia | October 6 | October 9 | | |
| 11 | V Argentina Internacional | | Buenos Aires | October 6 | October 9 | | |
| 12 | (Israel) Hatzor International 2016 | | Hatzor | November 2 | November 5 | | |

Canceled Tournament

| Tour | Official title | Venue | City | Date | | Prize money USD | Report |
| Tour | Official title | Venue | City | Start | Finish | Prize money USD | Report |
|---|---|---|---|---|---|---|---|
| 1 | IV Open Venezuela International 2016 | | Puerto la Cruz | July 7 | July 10 | | |

== Results ==
=== Winners ===
| Tour | Men's singles | Women's singles | Men's doubles | Women's doubles | Mixed doubles |
|---|---|---|---|---|---|
| Mauritius | (Mauritius) Aatish Lubah | (Uganda) Bridget Shamim Bangi | (South Africa) Andries Malan (South Africa) Willem Viljoen | (Uganda) Gloria Najjuka (Uganda) Daisy Nakalyango | (Mauritius) Sahir Edoo (Mauritius) Yeldy Louison |
| New Zealand | (Vietnam) Nguyễn Tiến Minh | (Vietnam) Vũ Thị Trang | (Chinese Taipei) Liu Wei-chen (Chinese Taipei) Yang Po-han | (Australia) Tiffany Ho (Australia) Jennifer Tam | (New Zealand) Kevin Dennerly-Minturn (New Zealand) Susannah Leydon-Davis |
| Ivory Coast | (Uganda) Edwin Ekiring | (Sri Lanka) Lekha Shehani | (Ivory Coast) Chandresh Kolleri Balakrishnan (Ivory Coast) Alex Patrick Zolobe | (Ivory Coast) Nogona Celine Bakayoko (Ivory Coast) Johanne Succar Saint-Blancat | (Nigeria) Gideon Babalola (Nigeria) Uchechukwu Deborah Ukeh |
| Croatia | (Norway) Marius Myhre | (Russia) Elena Komendrovskaja | (Croatia) Zvonimir Đurkinjak (Croatia) Filip Špoljarec | (Russia) Ksenia Evgenova (Russia) Elena Komendrovskaja | (Croatia) Zvonimir Đurkinjak (Croatia) Matea Čiča |
| Latvia | (France) Toma Junior Popov | (Russia) Elena Komendrovskaja | (Russia) Andrei Ivanov (Russia) Anton Nazarenko | (Russia) Ksenia Evgenova (Russia) Maria Shegurova | (France) Thom Gicquel (France) Léonice Huet |
| Lithuania | (Finland) Kasper Lehikoinen | (Russia) Elena Komendrovskaja | (Poland) Łukasz Moren (Poland) Wojciech Szkudlarczyk | (Russia) Ekaterina Bolotova (Russia) Anastasiia Semenova | (Russia) Denis Grachev (Russia) Ekaterina Bolotova |
| Greece | (Bulgaria) Ivan Rusev | (Bulgaria) Mariya Mitsova | (Bulgaria) Daniel Nikolov (Bulgaria) Ivan Rusev | (Bulgaria) Mariya Mitsova (Bulgaria) Petya Nedelcheva | (Bulgaria) Lilian Mihaylov (Bulgaria) Petya Nedelcheva |
| Venezuela | N/A | N/A | N/A | N/A | N/A |
| Aruba | (Dominican Republic) Nelson Javier | (Wales) Aimee Moran | (Suriname) Dylan Darmohoetomo (Suriname) Gilmar Jones | (Dominican Republic) Nairoby Abigail Jiménez (Dominican Republic) Bermary Altagracia Polanco Muñoz | (Barbados) Dakeil Thorpe (Barbados) Tamisha Williams |
| (Slovakia) Slovak | (Scotland) Matthew Carder | (Ukraine) Natalya Voytsekh | (Poland) Łukasz Moren (Poland) Wojciech Szkudlarczyk | (Bulgaria) Mariya Mitsova (Bulgaria) Petya Nedelcheva | (Czech Republic) Jakub Bitman (Czech Republic) Alžběta Bášová |
| Bulgaria | (Bulgaria) Panuga Riou | (England) Daniel Nikolov | (Bulgaria) Daniel Nikolov (Bulgaria) Ivan Rusev | (Turkey) Büşra Yalçınkaya (Turkey) Fatma Nur Yavuz | (Turkey) Melih Turgut (Turkey) Fatma Nur Yavuz |
| Argentina | (Argentina) Dino Delmastro | (Argentina) Bárbara María Berruezo | (Argentina) Javier de Paepe (Argentina) Martín Trejo | no competition | (Argentina) Mateo Delmastro (Argentina) Micaela Suárez |
| Israel | (Czech Republic) Lukáš Zevl | (Slovenia) Ana Marija Šetina | (Israel) Yonathan Levit (Israel) Ariel Shainski | (Russia) Irina Shorokhova (Russia) Kristina Virvich | (Israel) Ariel Shainski (Belarus) Krestina Silich |

=== Performance by countries ===
Tabulated below are the Future Series based on countries. Only countries who have won a title are listed:

| S.no | Team | MRI | NZL | CIV | CRO | LAT | LTU | GRE | VEN | ARU | SVK | BUL | ARG | ISR | Total |
|---|---|---|---|---|---|---|---|---|---|---|---|---|---|---|---|
| 1 | Russia | | | | 2 | 3 | 3 | | N/A | | | | | 1 | 9 |
| 2 | Bulgaria | | | | | | | 5 | N/A | | 1 | 2 | | | 8 |
| 3 | Argentina | | | | | | | | N/A | | | | 4 | | 4 |
| 4 | Uganda | 1 | | 2 | | | | | N/A | | | | | | 3 |
| 5 | Mauritius | 2 | | | | | | | N/A | | | | | | 2 |
| 5 | Vietnam | | 2 | | | | | | N/A | | | | | | 2 |
| 5 | Ivory Coast | | | 2 | | | | | N/A | | | | | | 2 |
| 5 | Croatia | | | | 2 | | | | N/A | | | | | | 2 |
| 5 | France | | | | | 2 | | | N/A | | | | | | 2 |
| 5 | Poland | | | | | | 1 | | N/A | | 1 | | | | 2 |
| 5 | Dominican Republic | | | | | | | | N/A | 2 | | | | | 2 |
| 5 | Turkey | | | | | | | | N/A | | | 2 | | | 2 |
| 5 | Czech Republic | | | | | | | | N/A | | 1 | | | 1 | 2 |
| 14 | Israel | | | | | | | | N/A | | | | | 1.5 | 1.5 |
| 15 | South Africa | 1 | | | | | | | N/A | | | | | | 1 |
| 15 | Chinese Taipei | | 1 | | | | | | N/A | | | | | | 1 |
| 15 | Australia | | 1 | | | | | | N/A | | | | | | 1 |
| 15 | New Zealand | | 1 | | | | | | N/A | | | | | | 1 |
| 15 | Nigeria | | | 1 | | | | | N/A | | | | | | 1 |
| 15 | Norway | | | | 1 | | | | N/A | | | | | | 1 |
| 15 | Finland | | | | | | 1 | | N/A | | | | | | 1 |
| 15 | Wales | | | | | | | | N/A | 1 | | | | | 1 |
| 15 | Suriname | | | | | | | | N/A | 1 | | | | | 1 |
| 15 | Barbados | | | | | | | | N/A | 1 | | | | | 1 |
| 15 | Scotland | | | | | | | | N/A | | 1 | | | | 1 |
| 15 | Ukraine | | | | | | | | N/A | | 1 | | | | 1 |
| 15 | Sri Lanka | | | 1 | | | | | N/A | | | | | | 1 |
| 15 | England | | | | | | | | N/A | | | 1 | | | 1 |
| 29 | Belarus | | | | | | | | N/A | | | | | 0.5 | 0.5 |
