= 2019 Dutch Open (badminton) =

2019 badminton tournament in Almere

Tournament details
- Dates: 8–13 October
- Level: Super 100
- Total prize money: US$75,000
- Venue: Topsportcentrum
- Location: Almere, Netherlands

Champions
- Men's singles: (India) Lakshya Sen
- Women's singles: (China) Wang Zhiyi
- Men's doubles: (Russia) Vladimir Ivanov (Russia) Ivan Sozonov
- Women's doubles: (Bulgaria) Gabriela Stoeva (Bulgaria) Stefani Stoeva
- Mixed doubles: (Netherlands) Robin Tabeling (Netherlands) Selena Piek

The 2019 Dutch Open (officially known as the Yonex Dutch Open 2019 for sponsorship reasons) was a badminton tournament which took place at Topsportcentrum in Almere, Netherlands, from 8 to 13 October 2019 and had a total purse of $75,000.

== Tournament ==
The 2019 Dutch Open was the ninth Super 100 tournament of the 2019 BWF World Tour and also part of the Dutch Open championships, which has been held since 1932. This tournament was organized by the Badminton Nederland and was sanctioned by the BWF.

=== Venue ===
This international tournament was held at Topsportcentrum in Almere, Flevoland, Netherlands.

=== Point distribution ===
Below is the point distribution table for each phase of the tournament based on the BWF points system for the BWF Tour Super 100 event.

Winner	Runner-up	3/4	5/8	9/16	17/32	33/64	65/128	129/256
5,500	4,680	3,850	3,030	2,110	1,290	510	240	100

=== Prize money ===
The total prize money for this tournament was US$75,000. Distribution of prize money was in accordance with BWF regulations.

Event	Winner	Finals	Semi-finals	Quarter-finals	Last 16
Singles	$5,625	$2,850	$1,087.50	$450	$262.50
Doubles	$5,925	$2,850	$1,050	$543.75	$281.25

== Men's singles ==
=== Seeds ===
1. (India) Sameer Verma (third round)
2. (Denmark) Rasmus Gemke (second round)
3. (Netherlands) Mark Caljouw (second round)
4. (India) Sourabh Verma (second round)
5. (France) Thomas Rouxel (second round)
6. (Denmark) Victor Svendsen (third round)
7. (England) Toby Penty (third round)
8. (France) Lucas Corvée (second round)

=== Finals ===
Semi-finals
Q5	(Japan) Yusuke Onodera	21	16	21
(China) Li Shifeng	19	21	13
(Sweden) Felix Burestedt	12	9
(India) Lakshya Sen	21	21

Final
Q5	(Japan) Yusuke Onodera	21	14	15
(India) Lakshya Sen	15	21	21

=== Top half ===
==== Section 1 ====
First Round
(Hungary) G Krausz	1^{r}
Q7	(India) K George	4
Q4	(Germany) L Schänzler	21	21
(Finland) I Heino	13	13
(Finland) E Heino	15	21	21
(Denmark) R Messerschmidt	21	17	5
Q3	(Bulgaria) D Nikolov	21	21
(Czech Republic) A Mendrek	12	16

Second Round
1	(India) Sa Verma	21	19	21
Q7	(India) K George	19	21	13
Q5	(Japan) Y Onodera	22	21
Q4	(Germany) L Schänzler	20	13
8	(France) L Corvée	15	21	18
(Finland) E Heino	21	12	21
(China) Weng HY	21	17	11
Q3	(Bulgaria) D Nikolov	17	21	21

Third Round
1	(India) Sa Verma	18	21	14
Q5	(Japan) Y Onodera	21	19	21
(Finland) E Heino	21	17	19
Q3	(Bulgaria) D Nikolov	13	21	21

Quarter-finals
Q5	(Japan) Y Onodera	21	21
Q3	(Bulgaria) D Nikolov	10	9

==== Section 2 ====
First Round
Q8	(France) A Merklé	21	21
(China) Liu HC	9	16
PFQ	(Malaysia) Tan J W	15	12
(Poland) M Rogalski	21	21
Q2	(France) L Rossi	15	21	21
(India) M Manjunath	21	12	10
(Canada) B. R. Sankeerth	21	13	12
(Spain) L E Peñalver	18	21	21

Second Round
3	(Netherlands) M Caljouw	21	16	15
Q8	(France) A Merklé	18	21	21
(Portugal) B Atilano	15
(Poland) M Rogalski	19^{r}
5	(France) T Rouxel	19	21	19
Q2	(France) L Rossi	21	16	21
(China) Li SF	22	21
(Spain) L E Peñalver	20	11

Third Round
Q8	(France) A Merklé	21	21
(Portugal) B Atilano	11	8
Q2	(France) L Rossi	19	17
(China) Li SF	21	21

Quarter-finals
Q8	(France) A Merklé	13	16
(China) Li SF	21	21

=== Bottom half ===
==== Section 3 ====
First Round
(Russia) S Sirant	21	9	21
(Denmark) K Bruun	13	21	19
(Estonia) R Must	21	21
(Finland) K Koljonen	18	10
PFQ	(Sweden) J Nilsson	8	15
(Sweden) F Burestedt	21	21
(Germany) K Schäfer	21	21
(Spain) P Abián	12	12

Second Round
(Russia) S Sirant	21	16	21
(France) T J Popov	15	21	15
(Estonia) R Must	18	19
7	(England) T Penty	21	21
(Sweden) F Burestedt	22	18	21
(Russia) V Malkov	20	21	16
(Germany) K Schäfer	21	10	21
4	(India) So Verma	17	21	19

Third Round
(Russia) S Sirant	8	21	21
7	(England) T Penty	21	18	18
(Sweden) F Burestedt	19	21	21
(Germany) K Schäfer	21	9	13

Quarter-finals
(Russia) S Sirant	11	20
(Sweden) F Burestedt	21	22

==== Section 4 ====
First Round
(China) Ren PB	21	19	11
Q6	(India) B. M. R Bharadwaj	10	21	21
(Belgium) M Moreels	18	21	13
Q1	(Denmark) J Brunn	21	13	21
(India) L Sen	21	21
(Republic of Ireland) N Nguyen	19	17
(Switzerland) C Kirchmayr	17	15
(Brazil) Y Coelho de Oliveira	21	21

Second Round
Q6	(India) B. M. R Bharadwaj	21	21
(Malaysia) Cheam J W	18	13
Q1	(Denmark) J Brunn	15	16
6	(Denmark) V Svendsen	21	21
(India) L Sen	21	21
(Cuba) O Guerrero	12	12
(Brazil) Y Coelho de Oliveira	20	18
2	(Denmark) R Gemke	22	11^{r}

Third Round
Q6	(India) B. M. R Bharadwaj	21	24	21
6	(Denmark) V Svendsen	17	26	8
(India) L Sen	21	16	21
(Brazil) Y Coelho de Oliveira	13	21	10

Quarter-finals
Q6	(India) B. M. R Bharadwaj	9	16
(India) L Sen	21	21

== Women's singles ==
=== Seeds ===
1. (Denmark) Line Kjærsfeldt (second round)
2. (Scotland) Kirsty Gilmour (first round)
3. (Spain) Carolina Marín (withdrew)
4. (Russia) Evgeniya Kosetskaya (final)
5. (Turkey) Neslihan Yiğit (first round)
6. (China) Zhang Yiman (semi-finals)
7. (Germany) Yvonne Li (second round)
8. (Chinese Taipei) Pai Yu-po (semi-finals)

=== Finals ===
Semi-finals
8	(Chinese Taipei) Pai Yu-po	14	17
(China) Wang Zhiyi	21	21
4	(Russia) Evgeniya Kosetskaya	12	21	21
6	(China) Zhang Yiman	21	17	17

Final
(China) Wang Zhiyi	21	21
4	(Russia) Evgeniya Kosetskaya	14	18

=== Top half ===
==== Section 1 ====
First Round
1	(Denmark) L Kjærsfeldt	21	21
(Slovakia) M Repiská	11	11
Q3	(China) Li Y	21	21
PFQ	(Australia) Chen H-y	18	16
8	(Chinese Taipei) Pai Y-p	21	21
PFQ	(Wales) J Hart	15	7
(Turkey) A Demirbağ	21	21
Q4	(Netherlands) G Mahulette	12	15

Second Round
1	(Denmark) L Kjærsfeldt	17	21	14
Q3	(China) Li Y	21	16	21
8	(Chinese Taipei) Pai Y-p	21	21
(Turkey) A Demirbag	16	16

Quarter-finals
Q3	(China) Li Y	22	21	15
8	(Chinese Taipei) Pai Y-p	24	19	21

==== Section 2 ====
First Round
PFQ	(Denmark) I A Andersen	15	5^{r}
(Netherlands) S de Visch Eijbergen	21	14
(Belgium) L Tan	16	15
(France) Qi XF	21	21
5	(Turkey) N Yiğit	17	17
(Russia) N Perminova	21	21
Q2	(China) Wei YX	12	12
(China) Wang ZY	21	21

Second Round
(Netherlands) S de Visch Eijbergen	11	6
(France) Qi XF	21	21
(Russia) N Perminova	15	16
(China) Wang ZY	21	21

Quarter-finals
(France) Qi XF	12	8
(China) Wang ZY	21	21

=== Bottom half ===
==== Section 3 ====
First Round
(Denmark) J D Jakobsen	21	21
PFQ	(Finland) A Mikkelä	8	15
(Bulgaria) L Zetchiri	12	17
7	(Germany) Y Li	21	21
PFQ	(Hungary) L Sárosi	21	17	10
(Israel) K Polikarpova	18	21	21
(Bulgaria) M Mitsova	7	15
4	(Russia) E Kosetskaya	21	21

Second Round
(Denmark) J D Jakobsen	21	21
7	(Germany) Y Li	14	5
(Israel) K Polikarpova	9	12
4	(Russia) E Kosetskaya	21	21

Quarter-finals
(Denmark) J D Jakobsen	18	13
4	(Russia) E Kosetskaya	21	21

==== Section 4 ====
First Round
(Estonia) K Kuuba	21	15
(Canada) B Tam	23	21
(Switzerland) S Jaquet	21	22	12
6	(China) Zhang YM	17	24	21
(Thailand) S Katethong	21	21
(Germany) F Deprez	11	18
Q1	(France) M Batomene	21	21
2	(Scotland) K Gilmour	19	17

Second Round
(Canada) B Tam	20	12
6	(China) Zhang YM	22	21
(Thailand) S Katethong	21	24
Q1	(France) M Batomene	18	22

Quarter-finals
6	(China) Zhang YM	21	10	21
(Thailand) S Katethong	15	21	16

== Men's doubles ==
=== Seeds ===
1. (Chinese Taipei) Liao Min-chun / Su Ching-heng (semi-finals)
2. (England) Marcus Ellis / Chris Langridge (quarter-finals)
3. (Germany) Mark Lamsfuß / Marvin Emil Seidel (final)
4. (Chinese Taipei) Lu Ching-yao / Yang Po-han (quarter-finals)
5. (Russia) Vladimir Ivanov / Ivan Sozonov (champions)
6. (China) Huang Kaixiang / Liu Cheng (quarter-finals)
7. (China) Ou Xuanyi / Zhang Nan (semi-finals)
8. (Netherlands) Jelle Maas / Robin Tabeling (quarter-finals)

=== Finals ===
Semi-finals
1	(Chinese Taipei) Liao Min-chun (Chinese Taipei) Su Ching-heng	21	12	13
5	(Russia) Vladimir Ivanov (Russia) Ivan Sozonov	19	21	21
3	(Germany) Mark Lamsfuß (Germany) Marvin Emil Seidel	21	21	21
7	(China) Ou Xuanyi (China) Zhang Nan	23	12	18

Final
5	(Russia) Vladimir Ivanov (Russia) Ivan Sozonov	21	21
3	(Germany) Mark Lamsfuß (Germany) Marvin Emil Seidel	19	16

=== Top half ===
==== Section 1 ====
First Round
1	(Chinese Taipei) Liao M-c (Chinese Taipei) Su C-h	21	21
(Russia) V Nikulov (Russia) A Serpionov	10	8
PFQ	(Canada) J Lam (England) H S Wong	10	11
(China) Dong WJ (China) Guo XW	21	21
6	(China) Huang KX (China) Liu C	21	21
(Russia) D Grachev (Russia) P Kotsarenko	11	13
(Netherlands) R Jille (Netherlands) T van der Lecq	21	13	17
(England) B Lane (England) S Vendy	11	21	21

Second Round
1	(Chinese Taipei) Liao M-c (Chinese Taipei) Su C-h	21	13	21
(China) Dong WJ (China) Guo XW	19	21	18
6	(China) Huang KX (China) Liu C	21	21
(England) B Lane (England) S Vendy	18	14

Quarter-finals
1	(Chinese Taipei) Liao M-c (Chinese Taipei) Su C-h	21	21
6	(China) Huang KX (China) Liu C	19	15

==== Section 2 ====
First Round
4	(Chinese Taipei) Lu C-y (Chinese Taipei) Yang P-ha	21	21
(Russia) N Khakimov (Russia) A Zinchenko	13	17
(Denmark) D Lundgaard (Denmark) M Thyrri	21	21
(Belgium) F Golinski (Germany) J Pistorius	12	18
5	(Russia) V Ivanov (Russia) I Sozonov	21	21
(Denmark) J Bay (Denmark) M Mikkelsen	16	10
(Germany) J R Jansen (Germany) P Käsbauer	21	21
(Scotland) A Dunn (Scotland) A Hall	18	12

Second Round
4	(Chinese Taipei) Lu C-y (Chinese Taipei) Yang P-ha	21	21
(Denmark) D Lundgaard (Denmark) M Thyrri	14	12
5	(Russia) V Ivanov (Russia) I Sozonov	16	21	21
(Germany) J R Jansen (Germany) P Käsbauer	21	16	19

Quarter-finals
4	(Chinese Taipei) Lu C-y (Chinese Taipei) Yang P-ha	21	17	11
5	(Russia) V Ivanov (Russia) I Sozonov	19	21	21

=== Bottom half ===
==== Section 3 ====
First Round
(Denmark) J Eipe (Denmark) R Kjær
Q2	(Denmark) T Holst (Denmark) M Stoffersen	w	/	o
(Suriname) M A Nai Chung Tong (Suriname) S Opti	10	11
8	(Netherlands) J Maas (Netherlands) R Tabeling	21	21
(Denmark) M Bay-Smidt (Denmark) L Mølhede	23	24
(France) E Adam (France) J Maio	21	22
(Germany) B Geiss (Germany) J C Völker	14	15
3	(Germany) M Lamsfuß (Germany) M E Seidel	21	21

Second Round
Q2	(Denmark) T Holst (Denmark) M Stoffersen	12	10
8	(Netherlands) J Maas (Netherlands) R Tabeling	21	21
(Denmark) M Bay-Smidt (Denmark) L Mølhede	11	17
3	(Germany) M Lamsfuß (Germany) M E Seidel	21	21

Quarter-finals
8	(Netherlands) J Maas (Netherlands) R Tabeling	11	7
3	(Germany) M Lamsfuß (Germany) M E Seidel	21	21

==== Section 4 ====
First Round
Q4	(Thailand) T Isriyanet (Thailand) K Kedren	21	21
(France) F Delrue (France) R Labar	14	17
Q1	(Netherlands) S Li (Netherlands) N Veenstra	8	16
7	(China) Ou XY (China) Zhang N	21	21
(England) C Hemming (England) G Mairs	21	21
(Germany) F Hammes (Germany) C Klauer	7	10
Q3	(France) S Corvée (France) W Villeger	10	15
2	(England) M Ellis (England) C Langridge	21	21

Second Round
Q4	(Thailand) T Isriyanet (Thailand) K Kedren	15	21	17
7	(China) Ou XY (China) Zhang N	21	16	21
(England) C Hemming (England) G Mairs	12	17
2	(England) M Ellis (England) C Langridge	21	21

Quarter-finals
7	(China) Ou XY (China) Zhang N	20	21	21
2	(England) M Ellis (England) C Langridge	22	17	15

== Women's doubles ==
=== Seeds ===
1. (Bulgaria) Gabriela Stoeva / Stefani Stoeva (champions)
2. (Denmark) Maiken Fruergaard / Sara Thygesen (withdrew)
3. (Russia) Ekaterina Bolotova / Alina Davletova (semi-finals)
4. (Netherlands) Selena Piek / Cheryl Seinen (quarter-finals)
5. (England) Chloe Birch / Lauren Smith (first round)
6. (France) Émilie Lefel / Anne Tran (first round)
7. (France) Delphine Delrue / Léa Palermo (quarter-finals)
8. (Sweden) Emma Karlsson / Johanna Magnusson (second round)

=== Finals ===
Semi-finals
1	(Bulgaria) Gabriela Stoeva (Bulgaria) Stefani Stoeva	21	21
3	(Russia) Ekaterina Bolotova (Russia) Alina Davletova	19	13
(Japan) Rin Iwanaga (Japan) Kie Nakanishi	21	21
(Germany) Linda Efler (Germany) Isabel Herttrich	11	13

Final
1	(Bulgaria) Gabriela Stoeva (Bulgaria) Stefani Stoeva	21	22
(Japan) Rin Iwanaga (Japan) Kie Nakanishi	10	20

=== Top half ===
==== Section 1 ====
First Round
1	(Bulgaria) G Stoeva (Bulgaria) S Stoeva	21	20	21
(China) Chen XF (China) Zhou CM	14	22	12
(China) Chen YY (China) Qiao SJ	w	/	o
(Germany) A Jäger (Germany) S Küspert
7	(France) D Delrue (France) L Palermo	15	21	21
(Denmark) J Finne-Ipsen (Denmark) M Surrow	21	15	15
(Netherlands) K de Wit (Netherlands) S de Wit	11	12
(England) J Moore (England) V Williams	21	21

Second Round
1	(Bulgaria) G Stoeva (Bulgaria) S Stoeva	21	21
(China) Chen YY (China) Qiao SJ	10	12
7	(France) D Delrue (France) L Palermo	18	21	21
(England) J Moore (England) V Williams	21	16	16

Quarter-finals
1	(Bulgaria) G Stoeva (Bulgaria) S Stoeva	21	22
7	(France) D Delrue (France) L Palermo	12	20

==== Section 2 ====
First Round
3	(Russia) E Bolotova (Russia) A Davletova	21	21
(China) Huang J (China) Zhang SX	13	15
(Russia) A Akchurina (Russia) O Morozova	17	21	13
(Denmark) A Magelund (Denmark) F Ravn	21	18	21
6	(France) É Lefel (France) A Tran	19	21	17
(Chinese Taipei) Cheng C-y (Chinese Taipei) Lee C-c	21	17	21
(Netherlands) D Jille (Netherlands) A Tirtosentono	24	17
(Malaysia) P Tan K L (Malaysia) M Thinaah	26	21

Second Round
3	(Russia) E Bolotova (Russia) A Davletova	14	21	21
(Denmark) A Magelund (Denmark) F Ravn	21	14	16
(Chinese Taipei) Cheng C-y (Chinese Taipei) Lee C-c	21	13	13
(Malaysia) P Tan K L (Malaysia) M Thinaah	17	21	21

Quarter-finals
3	(Russia) E Bolotova (Russia) A Davletova	23	22	21
(Malaysia) P Tan K L (Malaysia) Thinaah M	25	20	18

=== Bottom half ===
==== Section 3 ====
First Round
(Germany) E Janssens (Germany) K Ostermeyer	21	17	17
(Denmark) A Bøje (Denmark) M Poulsen	12	21	21
(Japan) R Iwanaga (Japan) K Nakanishi	21	21
5	(England) C Birch (England) L Smith	11	13
(Sweden) C Nistad (Sweden) M Sjöö	24	21
(France) V Hériau (France) M Lambert	22	12
(Latvia) I Pope (Latvia) M Radovska	11	8
4	(Netherlands) S Piek (Netherlands) C Seinen	21	21

Second Round
(Denmark) A Bøje (Denmark) M Poulsen	22	17
(Japan) R Iwanaga (Japan) K Nakanishi	24	21
(Sweden) C Nistad (Sweden) M Sjöö	18	22
4	(Netherlands) S Piek (Netherlands) C Seinen	21	24

Quarter-finals
(Japan) R Iwanaga (Japan) K Nakanishi	21	21
4	(Netherlands) S Piek (Netherlands) C Seinen	15	10

==== Section 4 ====
First Round
(Japan) S Hobara (Japan) N Sone	w	/	o
(Estonia) K-K Marran (Estonia) H Rüütel
(India) P Dandu (India) S Santosh	18	9
8	(Sweden) E Karlsson (Sweden) J Magnusson	21	21
(Switzerland) N Fankhauser (Netherlands) I Tabeling	10	11
(Germany) L Efler (Germany) I Herttrich	21	21
(Denmark) S Lundgaard (Denmark) R Søby	w	/	d
2	(Denmark) M Fruergaard (Denmark) S Thygesen	w	/	d

Second Round
(Japan) S Hobara (Japan) N Sone	21	21
8	(Sweden) E Karlsson (Sweden) J Magnusson	15	13
(Germany) L Efler (Germany) I Herttrich	w	/	o

Quarter-finals
(Japan) S Hobara (Japan) N Sone	18	21	19
(Germany) L Efler (Germany) I Herttrich	21	14	21

== Mixed doubles ==
=== Seeds ===
1. (England) Marcus Ellis / Lauren Smith (semi-finals)
2. (England) Chris Adcock / Gabby Adcock (final)
3. (Netherlands) Robin Tabeling / Selena Piek (champions)
4. (Germany) Mark Lamsfuß / Isabel Herttrich (second round)
5. (Russia) Rodion Alimov / Alina Davletova (first round)
6. (England) Ben Lane / Jessica Pugh (first round)
7. (Republic of Ireland) Sam Magee / Chloe Magee (second round)
8. (Germany) Marvin Emil Seidel / Linda Efler (first round)

=== Finals ===
Semi-finals
1	(England) Marcus Ellis (England) Lauren Smith	17	14
3	(Netherlands) Robin Tabeling (Netherlands) Selena Piek	21	21
(Denmark) Mathias Christiansen (Denmark) Alexandra Bøje	18	19
2	(England) Chris Adcock (England) Gabby Adcock	21	21

Final
3	(Netherlands) Robin Tabeling (Netherlands) Selena Piek	21	21
2	(England) Chris Adcock (England) Gabby Adcock	17	13

=== Top half ===
==== Section 1 ====
First Round
1	(England) M Ellis (England) L Smith	21	22
Q4	(Netherlands) R Jille (Netherlands) A Tirtosentono	18	20
(China) Guo XW (China) Zhang SX	21	18	21
Q1	(Germany) J Pistorius (Germany) L Käpplein	14	21	16
6	(England) B Lane (England) J Pugh	14	16
(Denmark) N Nøhr (Denmark) S Thygesen	21	21
(France) R Labar (France) A Tran	21	21
PFQ	(France) E Adam (France) M Lambert	11	17

Second Round
1	(England) M Ellis (England) L Smith	19	21	21
(China) Guo XW (China) Zhang SX	21	11	16
(Denmark) N Nøhr (Denmark) S Thygesen	21	21
(France) R Labar (France) A Tran	12	18

Quarter-finals
1	(England) M Ellis (England) L Smith	21	21
(Denmark) N Nøhr (Denmark) S Thygesen	9	15

==== Section 2 ====
First Round
3	(Netherlands) R Tabeling (Netherlands) S Piek	21	18	21
Q2	(Netherlands) T van der Lecq (Netherlands) D Jille	19	21	11
(Russia) D Grachev (Russia) E Bolotova	21	13	21
(Denmark) E Lauritzen (Denmark) I Bergstein	14	21	15
7	(Republic of Ireland) S Magee (Republic of Ireland) C Magee	21	18	21
(Germany) J C Völker (Germany) E Janssens	17	21	18
(Germany) P Scheiel (Germany) F Volkmann	11	9
(Denmark) J Bay (Denmark) S Lundgaard	21	21

Second Round
3	(Netherlands) R Tabeling (Netherlands) S Piek	21	21
(Russia) D Grachev (Russia) E Bolotova	13	13
7	(Republic of Ireland) S Magee (Republic of Ireland) C Magee	14	12
(Denmark) J Bay (Denmark) S Lundgaard	21	21

Quarter-finals
3	(Netherlands) R Tabeling (Netherlands) S Piek	21	21
(Denmark) J Bay (Denmark) S Lundgaard	17	12

=== Bottom half ===
==== Section 3 ====
First Round
(China) Dong WJ (China) Chen XF	21	12	21
(Poland) P Śmiłowski (Poland) M Świerczyńska	13	21	17
(Scotland) A Hall (Scotland) J MacPherson	21	21
5	(Russia) R Alimov (Russia) A Davletova	19	19
(Germany) J R Jansen (Germany) K Ostermeyer	15	21	22
(Denmark) M Christiansen (Denmark) A Bøje	21	18	24
(Russia) E Dremin (Russia) E Dimova	9	9
4	(Germany) M Lamsfuß (Germany) I Herttrich	21	21

Second Round
(China) Dong WJ (China) Chen XF	17	21	21
(Scotland) A Hall (Scotland) J MacPherson	21	14	15
(Denmark) M Christiansen (Denmark) A Bøje	10	21	21
4	(Germany) M Lamsfuß (Germany) I Herttrich	21	19	18

Quarter-finals
(China) Dong WJ (China) Chen XF	14	21	17
(Denmark) M Christiansen (Denmark) A Bøje	21	15	21

==== Section 4 ====
First Round
(Denmark) M Thyrri (Denmark) M Surrow	16	21	13
(Denmark) M Mikkelsen (Denmark) A Magelund	21	18	21
(China) Ren XY (China) Zhou CM	21	13	21
8	(Germany) M E Seidel (Germany) L Efler	18	21	17
(England) G Mairs (England) V Williams	10	21	21
(Chinese Taipei) Lu C-y (Chinese Taipei) Lee C-h	21	16	19
Q3	(England) C Hemming (England) J Moore	17	9
2	(England) C Adcock (England) G Adcock	21	21

Second Round
(Denmark) M Mikkelsen (Denmark) A Magelund	21	15	19
(China) Ren XY (China) Zhou CM	17	21	21
(England) G Mairs (England) V Williams	13	8
2	(England) C Adcock (England) G Adcock	21	21

Quarter-finals
(China) Ren XY (China) Zhou CM	19	24
2	(England) C Adcock (England) G Adcock	21	26

Preceded by 2019 Indonesia Masters Super 100	BWF World Tour; 2019 BWF season	Succeeded by 2019 Denmark Open
