= Badminton at the 2024 BRICS Games – Women's doubles =

Badminton event

Women's doubles at the 2024 BRICS Games
- Venue: Kazan Gymnastics Center
- Dates: 13 – 16 June 2024

Medalists
| gold medal | Alina Davletova; Evgeniya Kosetskaya | Russia |
| silver medal | Daria Kharlampovich; Galina Lisochkina | Russia |
| bronze medal | Sayane Regina Lima; Julia Viana Vieira | Brazil |
| bronze medal | Maryna Yanbayeva; Sofiya Yanouskaya | Belarus |

The women's doubles badminton tournament at the 2024 BRICS Games took place from 13 to 16 June 2024 at the Kazan Gymnastics Center at Kazan.

Alina Davletova and Evgeniya Kosetskaya won gold in the event after finishing in first place in the round robin event. Daria Kharlampovich and Galina Lisochkina placed second and won the silver medal. The bronze medals were awarded to Sayane Regina Lima and Julia Viana Vieira of Brazil and Maryna Yanbayeva and Sofiya Yanouskaya of Belarus.

== Competition format ==
Since there were only 5 teams competing in the tournament, there were no knockout stages and only the round-robin phase was held to determine the winners of the round-robin group. Teams that entered the top four on the group were guaranteed a medal.

Matches were played best-of-three games. Each game was played to 21, except that a team must win by 2 unless the score reaches 30–29.

== Schedule ==
The tournament was held over a 4-day period.

Legend

| RR | Round robin | M | Medal matches |

| Date | 13 Jun | 14 Jun | 15 Jun | 16 Jun |
|---|---|---|---|---|
| Women's doubles | RR | – | RR | M |

== Results ==
The round-robin stage was played from 13 June to 16 June. The teams were given a 1-day rest on 15 June.

=== Round robin ===
| Pos | Team | Pld | W | L | GF | GA | GD | PF | PA | PD | Pts | Qualification |
|---|---|---|---|---|---|---|---|---|---|---|---|---|
| 1 | Alina Davletova (RUS) Evgeniya Kosetskaya (RUS) (H) | 4 | 4 | 0 | 8 | 1 | +7 | 178 | 70 | +108 | 4 | Gold medal |
| 2 | Daria Kharlampovich (RUS) Galina Lisochkina (RUS) (H) | 4 | 3 | 1 | 7 | 2 | +5 | 160 | 111 | +49 | 3 | Silver medal |
| 3 | Sayane Regina Lima (BRA) Julia Viana Vieira (BRA) | 4 | 2 | 2 | 4 | 5 | −1 | 142 | 163 | −21 | 2 | Bronze medal |
| 4 | Maryna Yanbayeva (BLR) Sofiya Yanouskaya (BLR) | 4 | 1 | 3 | 3 | 6 | −3 | 140 | 175 | −35 | 1 | Bronze medal |
| 5 | Ranim Alhasbani (SYR) Fulla Alnajjar (SYR) | 4 | 0 | 4 | 0 | 8 | −8 | 67 | 168 | −101 | 0 | |

Source: Yandex
(H) Host

| Date | Time | Player 1 | Score | Player 2 | Set 1 | Set 2 | Set 3 |
|---|---|---|---|---|---|---|---|
| 13 June | 15:30 | Sayane Regina Lima (Brazil); Julia Viana Vieira (Brazil) | 2–1 | (Belarus) Maryna Yanbayeva (Belarus) Sofiya Yanouskaya | 21–14 | 23–25 | 22–20 |
| 13 June | 15:30 | Daria Kharlampovich (Russia); Galina Lisochkina (Russia) | 2–0 | (Syria) Ranim Alhasbani (Syria) Fulla Alnajjar | 21–5 | 21–2 | |
| 13 June | 16:30 | Daria Kharlampovich (Russia); Galina Lisochkina (Russia) | 2–0 | (Belarus) Maryna Yanbayeva (Belarus) Sofiya Yanouskaya | 21–16 | 21–15 | |
| 13 June | 16:30 | Alina Davletova (Russia); Evgeniya Kosetskaya (Russia) | 2–0 | (Syria) Ranim Alhasbani (Syria) Fulla Alnajjar | 21–7 | 21–8 | |
| 13 June | 17:30 | Alina Davletova (Russia); Evgeniya Kosetskaya (Russia) | 2–0 | (Belarus) Maryna Yanbayeva (Belarus) Sofiya Yanouskaya | 21–5 | 21–3 | |
| 13 June | 17:30 | Daria Kharlampovich (Russia); Galina Lisochkina (Russia) | 2–0 | (Brazil) Sayane Regina Lima (Brazil) Julia Viana Vieira | 21–9 | 21–12 | |
| 15 June | 11:30 | Sayane Regina Lima (Brazil); Julia Viana Vieira (Brazil) | 2–0 | (Syria) Ranim Alhasbani (Syria) Fulla Alnajjar | 21–11 | 21–9 | |
| 15 June | 17:00 | Alina Davletova (Russia); Evgeniya Kosetskaya (Russia) | 2–0 | (Brazil) Sayane Regina Lima (Brazil) Julia Viana Vieira | 21–8 | 21–5 | |
| 15 June | 17:10 | Maryna Yanbayeva (Belarus); Sofiya Yanouskaya (Belarus) | 2–0 | (Syria) Ranim Alhasbani (Syria) Fulla Alnajjar | 21–13 | 21–12 | |
| 16 June | 12:00 | Alina Davletova (Russia); Evgeniya Kosetskaya (Russia) | 2–1 | (Russia) Daria Kharlampovich (Russia) Galina Lisochkina | 21–8 | 10–21 | 21–5 |
