= 2014 Bitburger Open Grand Prix Gold =

Tournament details
- Dates: 28 October 2014– 2 November 2014
- Total prize money: US$120,000
- Venue: Saarlandhalle
- Location: Saarbrücken, Germany

The 2014 Bitburger Open was the fifteenth Grand Prix Gold and Grand Prix tournament of the 2014 BWF Grand Prix Gold and Grand Prix. The tournament was held in Saarlandhalle, Saarbrücken, Germany October 28 until November 2, 2014 and had a total purse of $120,000.

== Men's singles ==
=== Seeds ===
1. (Denmark) Viktor Axelsen (Withdrew)
2. (Chinese Taipei) Chou Tien-chen (Champion)
3. (China) Tian Houwei
4. (Germany) Marc Zwiebler
5. (England) Rajiv Ouseph
6. (Chinese Taipei) Hsu Jen-hao
7. (India) H. S. Prannoy
8. (Netherlands) Eric Pang
9. (Hong Kong) Wong Wing Ki
10. (India) Sourabh Varma
11. (Republic of Ireland) Scott Evans
12. (Germany) Dieter Domke
13. (China) Chen Yuekun
14. (Russia) Vladimir Ivanov
15. (India) B. Sai Praneeth
16. (Russia) Vladimir Malkov

=== Finals ===
Quarterfinals
(Denmark) Emil Holst	14	21	28
7	(India) H. S. Prannoy	21	19	30
11	(Republic of Ireland) Scott Evans	21	22
(Poland) Adrian Dziolko	9	20
Q3	(China) Liao Junwei	18	9
3	(China) Tian Houwei	21	21
(Italy) Indra Bagus Ade Chandra	10	20
2	(Chinese Taipei) Chou Tien-chen	21	22

Semifinals
7	(India) H. S. Prannoy	16	10
11	(Republic of Ireland) Scott Evans	21	21
3	(China) Tian Houwei	14	21	19
2	(Chinese Taipei) Chou Tien-chen	21	16	21

Final
11	(Republic of Ireland) Scott Evans	17	10
2	(Chinese Taipei) Chou Tien-chen	21	21

=== Top half ===
==== Section 1 ====
First Round
PFQ	(Sweden) M Westerback	21	21
(Finland) K Lehikoinen	14	16
(Ukraine) A Pochtarev	21	21
Q7	(Germany) D Benz	15	14
14	(Russia) V Ivanov	18	20
(Denmark) E Holst	21	22
Q4	(Bulgaria) S Makarski	21	16	21
(Finland) E Heino	17	21	18

Second Round
PFQ	(Sweden) M Westerback	15	22	12
(Ukraine) A Pochtarev	21	20	21
(Denmark) E Holst	21	18	21
Q4	(Bulgaria) S Makarski	18	21	11

Third Round
(Ukraine) A Pochtarev	10	14
(Denmark) E Holst	21	21

==== Section 2 ====
First Round
7	(India) H. S. Prannoy	21	21
(Netherlands) N Fransman	11	19
Q8	(Germany) P Kaemnitz	10	20
(India) A Jayaram	21	22
9	(Hong Kong) Wong Wing Ki	21	21
(Denmark) C L Thomsen	19	11
Q5	(Russia) A Parokhodin	8	17
Q1	(Germany) F Roth	21	21

Second Round
7	(India) H. S. Prannoy	21	21
(India) A Jayaram	18	17
9	(Hong Kong) Wong Wing Ki	21	21
Q1	(Germany) F Roth	17	10

Third Round
7	(India) H. S. Prannoy	21	21
9	(Hong Kong) Wong Wing Ki	19	18

==== Section 3 ====
First Round
4	(Germany) M Zwiebler	21	11	14
(Hong Kong) Chan Yan Kit	17	21	21
PFQ	(Indonesia) A Pratama	17	20
(Denmark) F Quach	21	22
11	(Republic of Ireland) S Evans	21	21
(Sweden) G Ulldahl	17	18
(Germany) L Schmidt	21	6	11
(Netherlands) E Meijs	14	21	21

Second Round
(Hong Kong) Chan Yan Kit	21	13	21
(Denmark) F Quach	12	21	12
11	(Republic of Ireland) S Evans	21	21
(Netherlands) E Meijs	19	16

Third Round
(Hong Kong) Chan Yan Kit	12	14
11	(Republic of Ireland) S Evans	21	21

==== Section 4 ====
First Round
6	(Chinese Taipei) Hsu Jen-hao	21	18	21
(Denmark) K Bruun	15	21	16
Q6	(Germany) K Schaefer	23	21
(Malaysia) Jiann S C	21	16
13	(China) Chen Yuekun	21	21
(Ukraine) D Zavadsky	10	7
Q2	(France) Y Turlan	7	13
(Poland) A Dziolko	21	21

Second Round
6	(Chinese Taipei) Hsu Jen-hao	21	21
Q6	(Germany) K Schaefer	10	15
13	(China) Chen Yuekun	19	12
(Poland) A Dziolko	21	21

Third Round
6	(Chinese Taipei) Hsu Jen-hao	21	21	21
(Poland) A Dziolko	7	23	23

=== Bottom half ===
==== Section 5 ====
First Round
(Malaysia) B J T Wong	21	21
(Scotland) K Merrilees	16	16
Q4	(China) Liao Junwei	21	21
10	(India) S Varma	12	18
(Singapore) Derek Wong Z L	21	21
(Denmark) R Fladberg	19	17
(China) Gao Huan	21	21
8	(Netherlands) Eric Pang	9	16

Second Round
(Malaysia) B J T Wong	8	21
Q4	(China) Liao Junwei	21	23
(Singapore) Derek Wong Z L	12	10
(China) Gao Huan	21	21

Third Round
Q4	(China) Liao Junwei	21	21
(China) Gao Huan	12	10

==== Section 6 ====
First Round
(Bulgaria) B Kisyov	12	19
(Netherlands) J Hilbink	21	21
(Finland) V Lang	11	18
16	(Russia) V Malkov	21	21
(Czech Republic) P Koukal	25	13	21
(India) A Pawar	23	21	18
(Spain) Pablo Abian	10	15
3	(China) Tian Houwei	21	21

Second Round
(Netherlands) J Hilbink	8	21
16	(Russia) V Malkov	21	23
(Czech Republic) P Koukal	9	9
3	(China) Tian Houwei	21	21

Third Round
16	(Russia) V Malkov	17	8
3	(China) Tian Houwei	21	21

==== Section 7 ====
First Round
(France) A Genin
(Lithuania) K Navickas	WO
(Austria) M Almer	15	14
15	(India) B. Sai Praneeth	21	21
(Italy) I B A Chandra	19	21	21
(Malaysia) Tan Chun Seang	21	14	15
(Poland) M Rogalski	21	21
PFQ	(Germany) T Wadenka	16	14

Second Round
(France) A Genin	WO
15	(India) B. Sai Praneeth
(Italy) I B A Chandra	21	21
(Poland) M Rogalski	13	18

Third Round
14	(India) B. Sai Praneeth	21	14	18
(Italy) I B A Chandra	15	21	21

==== Section 8 ====
First Round
(Ukraine) V Atrashchenkov	19	16
(Indonesia) A K Tedjono	21	21
(Russia) A Yartsev	21
11	(Germany) D Domke	23	^{r}
(Hong Kong) Ng Ka Long	21	21
(Belgium) Y Tan	9	13
(Estonia) Raul Must	21	12	20
2	(Chinese Taipei) Chou Tien-chen	13	21	22

Second Round
(Indonesia) A K Tedjono	21	21
16	(Russia) A Yartsev	17	17
(Hong Kong) Ng Ka Long	13	17
2	(Chinese Taipei) Chou Tien-chen	21	21

Third Round
(Indonesia) A K Tedjono	15	21	18
2	(Chinese Taipei) Chou Tien-chen	21	15	21

== Women's singles ==
=== Seeds ===
1. (Spain) Carolina Marin
2. (Canada) Michelle Li
3. (United States) Zhang Beiwen
4. (China) Sun Yu
5. (Hong Kong) Yip Pui Yin
6. (Spain) Beatriz Corrales
7. (Chinese Taipei) Hsu Ya-ching
8. (Indonesia) Lindaweni Fanetri

=== Finals ===
Semifinals
1	(Spain) Carolina Marin	19	14
4	(China) Sun Yu	21	21
Q1	(China) He Bingjiao	21	21
2	(Canada) Michelle Li	16	10

Final
4	(China) Sun Yu	16	21	21
Q1	(China) He Bingjiao	21	15	12

=== Top half ===
==== Section 1 ====
First Round
1	(Spain) Carolina Marin	21	21
Q2	(Netherlands) S de Visch Eijbergen	13	6
(United States) Rong Schafer	21	21
Q3	(Finland) N Vainio	9	15
7	(Chinese Taipei) Hsu Ya-ching	19	21	16
(Denmark) L Kjaersfeldt	21	14	21
(Bulgaria) P Nedelcheva	18	21	14
(Russia) K Polikarpova	21	13	21

Second Round
1	(Spain) Carolina Marin	21	21
(United States) Rong Schafer	9	12
(Denmark) L Kjaersfeldt	21	19	21
(Russia) K Polikarpova	13	21	13

Quarterfinals
1	(Spain) Carolina Marin	21	17	21
(Denmark) L Kjaersfeldt	15	21	16

==== Section 2 ====
First Round
4	(China) Sun Yu
Q4	(Mauritius) K F Kune	WO
(India) T Lad	21	19	23
(Malaysia) S Saniru	13	21	21
8	(Indonesia) L Fanetri	21	21
(France) S V Waran	15	14
(Bulgaria) S Stoeva	22	20	19
(Indonesia) M Wiranto	20	22	21

Second Round
4	(China) Sun Yu	21	21
(India) T Lad	17	12
8	(Indonesia) L Fanetri	21	21
(Indonesia) M Wiranto	14	16

Quarterfinals
4	(China) Sun Yu	21	18	21
8	(Indonesia) L Fanetri	14	21	7

=== Bottom half ===
==== Section 3 ====
First Round
Q1	(China) He Bingjiao	21	21
(Bulgaria) L Zetchiri	16	16
(Republic of Ireland) C Magee	23	20	16
5	(Hong Kong) Yip Pui Yin	21	22	21
(Denmark) A T Madsen	17	8
(Chinese Taipei) Pai Yu-po	21	21
(Russia) E Kosetskaya	13	14
3	(United States) Zhang Beiwen	21	22

Second Round
Q1	(China) He Bingjiao	22	21
(Hong Kong) Yip Pui Yin	20	17
(Chinese Taipei) Pai Yu-po	19	13
3	(United States) Zhang Beiwen	21	21

Quarterfinals
Q1	(China) He Bingjiao	14	21	21
3	(United States) Zhang Beiwen	21	19	12

==== Section 4 ====
First Round
(Germany) K Schnaase	21	15	19
(Russia) N Perminova	18	21	21
(Switzerland) S Jaquet	21	21
6	(Spain) B Corrales	15	8
PFQ	(Italy) J Cicognini	19	13
(Indonesia) B Manuputty	21	21
(India) P. C. Thulasi	21	10	15
2	(Canada) Michelle Li	14	21	21

Second Round
(Russia) N Perminova	22	21
(Switzerland) S Jaquet	20	19
(Indonesia) B Manuputty	17	14
2	(Canada) Michelle Li	21	21

Quarterfinals
(Russia) N Perminova	11	11
2	(Canada) Michelle Li	21	21

== Men's doubles ==
=== Seeds ===
1. (Denmark) Mathias Boe / Carsten Mogensen (Withdrew)
2. (Denmark) Mads Conrad-Petersen / Mads Pieler Kolding
3. (Germany) Michael Fuchs / Johannes Schoettler
4. (Russia) Vladimir Ivanov / Ivan Sozonov
5. (Denmark) Anders Skaarup Rasmussen / Kim Astrup Sorensen
6. (China) Wang Yilv / Zhang Wen
7. (Indonesia) Berry Anggriawan / Ricky Karanda Suwardi
8. (Poland) Adam Cwalina / Przemyslaw Wacha

=== Finals ===
Semifinals
6	(China) Wang Yilv (China) Zhang Wen	21	23	21
4	(Russia) Vladimir Ivanov (Russia) Ivan Sozonov	11	25	11
3	(Germany) Michael Fuchs (Germany) Johannes Schoettler	21	19	12
5	(Denmark) Anders Skaarup Rasmussen (Denmark) Kim Astrup Sorensen	11	21	21

Final
6	(China) Wang Yilv (China) Zhang Wen	21	21
5	(Denmark) Anders Skaarup Rasmussen (Denmark) Kim Astrup Sorensen	14	10

=== Top half ===
==== Section 1 ====
First Round
PFQ	(Denmark) F Colberg (Denmark) N Nohr	18	21	21
(England) A Ellis (England) P Mills	21	19	16
(India) P J Chopra (India) A Dewalkar	21	21
(Germany) R Beck (Germany) A Heinz	12	18
6	(China) Wang Yilv (China) Zhang Wen	21	21
(Denmark) Kasper Antonsen (Denmark) O Babic	12	17
(England) M Nottingham (England) H Towler	18	15
(Germany) M Schwenger (Germany) J Zurwonne	21	21

Second Round
PFQ	(Denmark) F Colberg (Denmark) N Nohr	21	20	12
(India) P J Chopra (India) A Dewalkar	15	22	21
6	(China) Wang Yilv (China) Zhang Wen	14	21	21
(Germany) M Schwenger (Germany) J Zurwonne	21	13	19

Quarterfinals
(India) P J Chopra (India) A Dewalkar	11	11
6	(China) Wang Yilv (China) Zhang Wen	21	21

==== Section 2 ====
First Round
4	(Russia) V Ivanov (Russia) I Sozonov	21	21
Q1	(Germany) J Pistorius (Germany) M E Seidel	11	11
(Belgium) M Dierickx (Belgium) F Golinski	18	16
(Indonesia) W Nayaka (Indonesia) A Yusuf	21	21
8	(Poland) A Cwalina (Poland) P Wacha	21	21
(Denmark) M Christiansen (Denmark) D Daugaard	15	17
(England) C Coles (Scotland) P van Rietvelde	23	21	16
(Germany) F Holzer (Germany) M Lamsfuss	25	17	21

Second Round
4	(Russia) V Ivanov (Russia) I Sozonov	21	21
(Indonesia) W Nayaka (Indonesia) A Yusuf	17	14
8	(Poland) A Cwalina (Poland) P Wacha	19	21	21
(Germany) F Holzer (Germany) M Lamsfuss	21	17	12

Quarterfinals
4	(Russia) V Ivanov (Russia) I Sozonov	21	21
8	(Poland) A Cwalina (Poland) P Wacha	18	19

=== Bottom half ===
==== Section 3 ====
First Round
(England) M Ellis (England) C Langridge	21	21	21
Q2	(Ukraine) G Natarov (Ukraine) A Pochtarev	23	14	15
(China) Chen Zuofu (China) Shi Longfei	21	18	18
7	(Indonesia) B Angriawan (Indonesia) R K Suwardi	16	21	21
Q3	(Indonesia) A Yulianto (Indonesia) Y S Dasuki	24	21	21
Q4	(Austria) J Koch (Denmark) C T Thomsen	26	18	18
(China) Huang Kaixiang (China) Zheng Siwei	15	16
3	(Germany) M Fuchs (Germany) J Schoettler	21	21

Second Round
(England) M Ellis (England) C Langridge	16	21	17
7	(Indonesia) B Angriawan (Indonesia) R K Suwardi	21	18	21
Q3	(Indonesia) A Yulianto (Indonesia) Y S Dasuki	13	15
3	(Germany) M Fuchs (Germany) J Schoettler	21	21

Quarterfinals
7	(Indonesia) B Angriawan (Indonesia) R K Suwardi	13	21	11
3	(Germany) M Fuchs (Germany) J Schoettler	21	10	21

==== Section 4 ====
First Round
(Denmark) S Gravholt (Denmark) N Overgaard	18	14
(Netherlands) J Arrends (Netherlands) J Maas	21	21
(Poland) L Moren (Poland) W Szkudlarczyk	15	20
5	(Denmark) A S Rasmussen (Denmark) K A Sorensen	21	22
(India) M Attri (India) B. Sumeeth Reddy	21	18	22
(Indonesia) A Adistia (Indonesia) H A Gunawan	8	21	24
(Republic of Ireland) J Magee (Republic of Ireland) S Magee	9	12
2	(Denmark) M Conrad-Petersen (Denmark) M P Kolding	21	21

Second Round
(Netherlands) J Arends (Netherlands) J Maas	12	16
5	(Denmark) A S Rasmussen (Denmark) K A Sorensen	21	21
(Indonesia) A Adistia (Indonesia) H A Gunawan	7	12
2	(Denmark) M Conrad-Petersen (Denmark) M P Kolding	21	21

Quarterfinals
5	(Denmark) A S Rasmussen (Denmark) K A Sorensen	21	21
2	(Denmark) M Conrad-Petersen (Denmark) M P Kolding	16	18

== Women's doubles ==
=== Seeds ===
1. (Netherlands) Eefje Muskens / Selena Piek
2. (Bulgaria) Gabriela Stoeva / Stefani Stoeva
3. (Russia) Anastasia Chervyakova / Nina Vislova
4. (Netherlands) Samantha Barning / Iris Tabeling
5. (China) Xia Huan / Zhong Qianxin
6. (Indonesia) Dian Fitriani / Nadya Melati
7. (Germany) Johanna Goliszewski / Carla Nelte
8. (England) Heather Olver / Lauren Smith

=== Finals ===
Semifinals
(China) Ou Dongni (China) Yu Xiaohan	21	24
5	(China) Xia Huan (China) Zhong Qianxin	14	22
(Russia) Ekaterina Bolotova (Russia) Evgeniya Kosetskaya	21	9	21
(China) Tang Yuanting (China) Huang Yaqiong	19	21	19

Final
(China) Ou Dongni (China) Yu Xiaohan	21	21
(Russia) Ekaterina Bolotova (Russia) Evgeniya Kosetskaya	15	15

=== Top half ===
==== Section 1 ====
First Round
1	(Netherlands) E Muskens (Netherlands) S Piek	21	16	21
(Germany) B Bellenberg (Germany) R Hacks	9	21	12
(China) Ou Dongni (China) Yu Xiaohan
(Mauritius) K F Kune (Germany) A Horbach	WO
7	(Germany) J Goliszewski (Germany) C Nelte	21	21
Q4	(Chinese Taipei) Hsu Ya-ching (Chinese Taipei) Pai Yu-po	14	10
(Germany) C Bott (Germany) J Karnott	12	18
PFQ	(Switzerland) N Fankhauser (Malaysia) S Saniru	21	21

Second Round
1	(Netherlands) E Muskens (Netherlands) S Piek	12	12
(China) Ou Dongni (China) Yu Xiaohan	21	21
7	(Germany) J Goliszewski (Germany) C Nelte	21	21
(Switzerland) N Fankhauser (Malaysia) S Saniru	11	18

Quarterfinals
(China) Ou Dongni (China) Yu Xiaohan	16	13
7	(Germany) J Goliszewski (Germany) C Nelte	21	21

==== Section 2 ====
First Round
3	(Russia) A Chervyakova (Russia) N Vislova	21	21
(Germany) L Kaminski (Germany) H Pohl	7	10
(Ukraine) N Voytsekh (Ukraine) Y Zharka	21	17	15
(Indonesia) M Jauhari (Indonesia) V A P Lejarsar	19	21	21
5	(China) Xia Huan (China) Zhong Qianxin	21	21
(Czech Republic) S Krizkova (Czech Republic) K Tomalova	12	7
Q4	(Italy) K Maran (Italy) M Punter	11	12
(England) S Brown (England) K Robertshaw	21	21

Second Round
3	(Russia) A Chervyakova (Russia) N Vislova	15	11
(Indonesia) M Jauhari (Indonesia) V A P Lejarsar	21	21
5	(China) Xia Huan (China) Zhong Qianxin	13	21	21
(England) S Brown (England) K Robertshaw	21	6	15

Quarterfinals
(Indonesia) M Jauhari (Indonesia) V A P Lejarsar	12	11
5	(China) Xia Huan (China) Zhong Qianxin	21	21

=== Bottom half ===
==== Section 3 ====
First Round
Q1	(Germany) F Kohler (Germany) T Wurm	15	10
(Russia) E Bolotova (Russia) E Kosetskaya	21	21
Q2	(Luxembourg) T Aulner (Luxembourg) M Goedert	11	13
8	(England) H Olver (England) L Smith	21	21
(China) Chen Qingchen (China) Jia Yifan	21	21
(Germany) I Herttrich (Germany) B Michels	15	14
(Germany) K Kattenbeck (Germany) K Volkmann	12	13
(Netherlands) S Barning (Netherlands) I Tabeling	21	21

Second Round
(Russia) E Bolotova (Russia) E Kosetskaya	21	19	21
8	(England) H Olver (England) L Smith	18	21	14
(China) Chen Qingchen (China) Jia Yifan	18	19
8	(Netherlands) S Barning (Netherlands) I Tabeling	21	21

Quarterfinals
(Russia) E Bolotova (Russia) E Kosetskaya	22	21
8	(Netherlands) S Barning (Netherlands) I Tabeling	20	13

==== Section 4 ====
First Round
PFQ	(Sweden) E Fabbeke (Denmark) L Grebak	16	21	21
(England) C Birch (England) A Lim	21	9	12
Q3	(Germany) P Becher (Germany) P Kick	8	13
6	(Indonesia) D Fitriani (Indonesia) N Melati	21	21
(China) Tang Yuanting (China) Huang Yaqiong	21	21
(India) P Gadre (India) N. Siki Reddy	13	11
(Denmark) M Fruergaard (Denmark) S Thygesen	22	12	7
2	(Bulgaria) G Stoeva (Bulgaria) S Stoeva	20	21	21

Second Round
PFQ	(Sweden) E Fabbeke (Denmark) L Grebak	14	13
6	(Indonesia) D Fitriani (Indonesia) N Melati	21	21
(China) Tang Yuanting (China) Huang Yaqiong	21	21
2	(Bulgaria) G Stoeva (Bulgaria) S Stoeva	14	6

Quarterfinals
6	(Indonesia) D Fitriani (Indonesia) N Melati	12	15
(China) Tang Yuanting (China) Huang Yaqiong	21	21

== Mixed doubles ==
=== Seeds ===
1. (England) Chris Adcock / Gabrielle Adcock
2. (Germany) Michael Fuchs / Birgit Michels
3. (Singapore) Danny Bawa Chrisnanta / Vanessa Neo
4. (Germany) Max Schwenger / Carla Nelte
5. (China) Huang Kaixiang / Jia Yifan
6. (China) Zheng Siwei / Chen Qingchen
7. (Netherlands) Jacco Arends / Selena Piek
8. (Germany) Peter Kaesbauer / Isabel Herttrich

=== Finals ===
Semifinals
1	(England) Chris Adcock (England) Gabrielle Adcock	21	14	18
6	(China) Zheng Siwei (China) Chen Qingchen	14	21	21
(Indonesia) Alfian Eko Prasetya (Indonesia) Annisa Saufika	12	21	21
2	(Germany) Michael Fuchs (Germany) Birgit Michels	21	18	15

Final
6	(China) Zheng Siwei (China) Chen Qingchen	21	21
(Indonesia) Alfian Eko Prasetya (Indonesia) Annisa Saufika	11	13

=== Top half ===
==== Section 1 ====
First Round
1	(England) Chris Adcock (England) Gabrielle Adcock	21	21
(China) Chen Zhuofu (China) Yu Xiaohan	16	18
(Sweden) J Nordh (Sweden) E Fabbeke	17	22	17
PFQ	(Germany) R Beck (Germany) K Kattenbeck	21	20	21
7	(Netherlands) J Arends (Netherlands) S Piek	21	19	17
(India) A Dewalkar (India) P Gadre	13	21	21
(Russia) V Ivanov (India) A Ponnappa	23	21
(Netherlands) J Maas (Netherlands) I Tabeling	21	12

Second Round
1	(England) Chris Adcock (England) Gabrielle Adcock	21	21
PFQ	(Germany) R Beck (Germany) K Kattenbeck	14	12
(India) A Dewalkar (India) P Gadre	13	21	14
(Russia) V Ivanov (India) A Ponnappa	21	15	21

Quarterfinals
1	(England) Chris Adcock (England) Gabrielle Adcock	21	21
(Russia) V Ivanov (India) A Ponnappa	19	9

==== Section 2 ====
First Round
4	(Germany) M Schwenger (Germany) C Nelte	21	10	17
(Republic of Ireland) S Magee (Republic of Ireland) C Magee	15	21	21
(Russia) V Durkin (Russia) N Vislova	18	14
(China) Wang Yilv (China) Ou Dongni	21	21
6	(China) Zheng Siwei (China) Chen Qingchen	21	21
Q2	(Russia) A Parokhodin (Russia) A Chervyakova	7	11
(Denmark) N Nohr (Denmark) S Thygesen	14	18
(China) Zhang Wen (China) Xia Huan	21	21

Second Round
(Republic of Ireland) S Magee (Republic of Ireland) C Magee	16	19
(China) Wang Yilv (China) Ou Dongni	21	21
6	(China) Zheng Siwei (China) Chen Qingchen	21	21
(China) Zhang Wen (China) Xia Huan	16	13

Quarterfinals
(China) Wang Yilv (China) Ou Dongni	12	17
6	(China) Zheng Siwei (China) Chen Qingchen	21	21

=== Bottom half ===
==== Section 3 ====
First Round
(Germany) J Schoettler (Germany) J Goliszewski	21	21
(Russia) R Kargaev (Russia) E Bolotova	13	19
Q4	(Germany) M E Seidel (Germany) L Efler	16	22
8	(Germany) P Kaesbauer (Germany) I Herttrich	21	24
(Ukraine) G Natarov (Ukraine) Y Kazarinova	11	22	18
(Denmark) M Christiansen (Denmark) L Grebak	21	20	21
(Indonesia) A E Prasetya (Indonesia) A Saufika	21	13	21
3	(Singapore) D B Chrisnanta (Singapore) Vanessa Neo Y Y	19	21	17

Second Round
(Germany) J Schoettler (Germany) J Goliszewski	13	21	21
8	(Germany) P Kaesbauer (Germany) I Herttrich	21	19	14
(Denmark) M Christiansen (Denmark) L Grebak	14	21	20
(Indonesia) A E Prasetya (Indonesia) A Saufika	21	16	22

Quarterfinals
(Germany) J Schoettler (Germany) J Goliszewski	13	11
(Indonesia) A E Prasetya (Indonesia) A Saufika	21	21

==== Section 4 ====
First Round
PFQ	(India) M Attri (India) N. Siki Reddy	15	7
Q1	(China) Shi Longfei (China) Zhong Qianxin	21	21
(Russia) A Yartsev (Russia) E Kosetskaya	18	19
5	(China) Huang Kaixiang (China) Jia Yifan	21	21
Q3	(Germany) J R Jansen (Indonesia) N Melati	17	15
(Netherlands) J de Ruiter (Netherlands) S Barning	21	21
(Russia) E Dremin (Russia) E Dimova	9	14
2	(Germany) M Fuchs (Germany) B Michels	21	21

Second Round
Q1	(China) Shi Longfei (China) Zhong Qianxin	21	21
5	(China) Huang Kaixiang (China) Jia Yifan	19	14
(Netherlands) J de Ruiter (Netherlands) S Barning	11	17
2	(Germany) M Fuchs (Germany) B Michels	21	21

Quarterfinals
Q1	(China) Shi Longfei (China) Zhong Qianxin	18	11
2	(Germany) M Fuchs (Germany) B Michels	21	21

Preceded by 2014 Dutch Open Grand Prix	BWF Grand Prix Gold and Grand Prix; 2014 season	Succeeded by 2014 Korea Open Grand Prix Gold
