= Ruthvika Gadde =

Indian badminton player (born 1997)

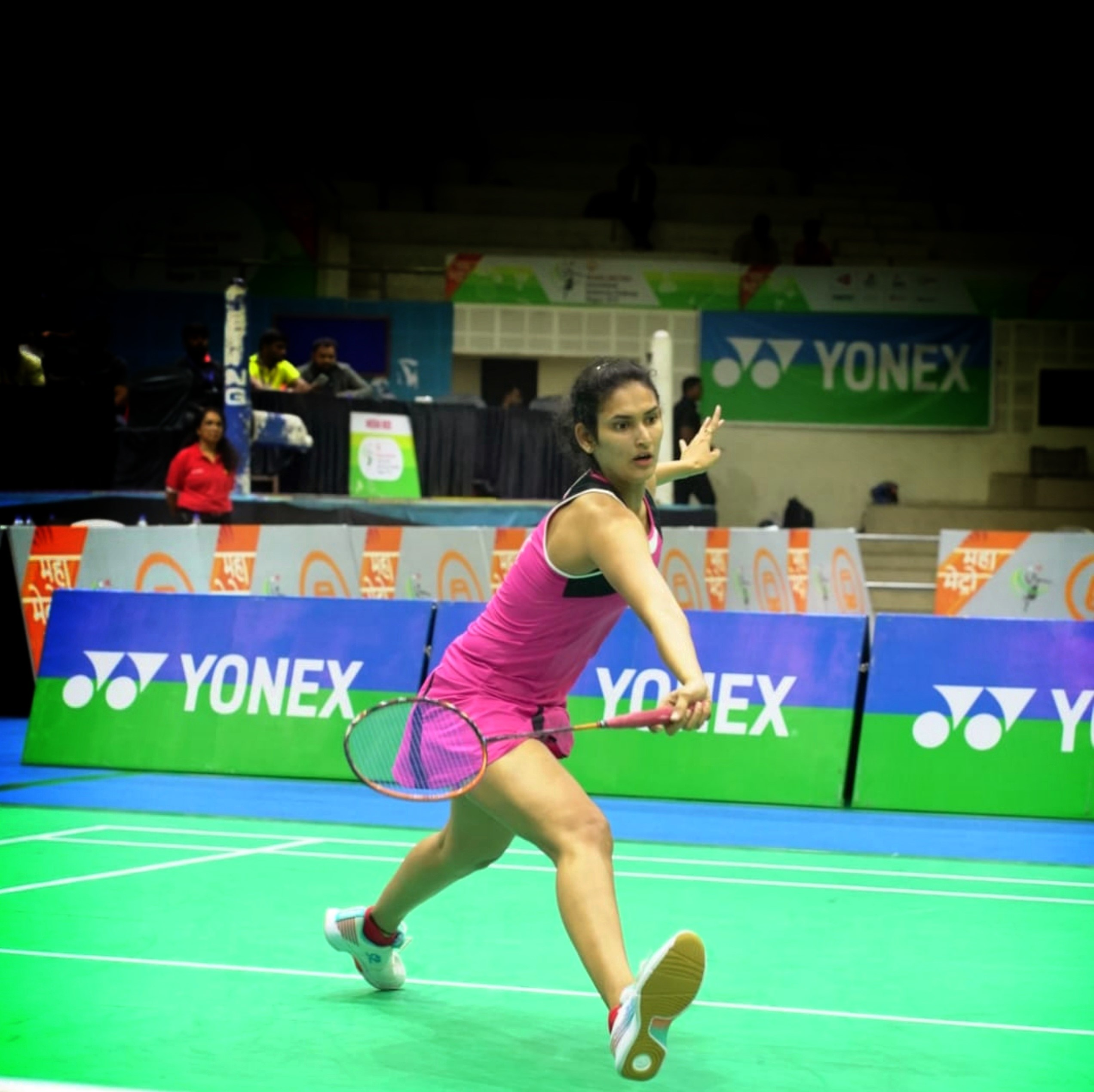
- Ruthvika in 2022

Personal information
- Full name: Ruthvika Shivani Gadde
- Born: 26 March 1997 (age 29) Vijayawada, Andhra Pradesh, India
- Height: 1.73 m (5 ft 8 in)
- Weight: 60 kg (132 lb)

Sport
- Country: India
- Sport: Badminton
- Handedness: Right
- Coached by: Pullela Gopichand

Women's singles & mixed doubles
- Highest ranking: 49 (WS, 1 December 2016); 29 (XD with Rohan Kapoor, 3 June 2025)
- Current ranking: 40 (XD with Rohan Kapoor, 3 November 2026)
- BWF profile
Medal record
Women's badminton
Representing India
Uber Cup
Bronze medal – third place	2016 Kunshan	Women's team
Commonwealth Games
Gold medal – first place	2018 Gold Coast	Mixed team
South Asian Games
Gold medal – first place	2016 Guwahati-Shillong	Women's singles
Gold medal – first place	2016 Guwahati-Shillong	Women's team
Asian Junior Championships
Bronze medal – third place	2011 Lucknow	Mixed team

Ruthvika Shivani Gadde (Telugu: గద్దె రుత్విక శివాని; born 26 March 1997) is an Indian badminton player who plays mixed doubles. She trains at the Gopichand Badminton Academy.

== Early life ==
Gadde, the daughter of G. Bhavani Prasad and G. Prameela Rani, was born in a Telugu family on 26 March 1997.

== Career ==
At the 2016 South Asian Games held in Guwahati and Shillong, she won two gold medals, in women's team and women's singles. She defeated P. V. Sindhu in straight games winning the women's singles title. She was a women's team member in India's national team at the 2016 Uber Cup and secured bronze medal in 2016 Thomas & Uber Cup held in Kunshan, China. In the quarter-finals she defeated Thailand's top player Nichaon Jindapol by 21–18, 21-16 with that victory Indian women's team secured bronze medal in Uber Cup.

In 2017, Shivani participated at V.V. Natu Memorial All India Senior Ranking and won women's singles in Pune in August, where she defeated Anura Prabhudesai. She also won a gold medal in the Mixed team event at the 73rd Inter State - Inter Zonal Senior National Badminton Mixed Team Championship in Nagpur.

At the 82nd Senior National Badminton Championship, Shivani lost to P. V. Sindhu, earning a bronze medal in Nagpur. She later competed in the Tata Open India International Challenge in Mumbai, defeating Riya Mukherjee 21–12, 23–21 to claim another victory in women's singles.

== Achievements ==
=== South Asian Games ===
Women's singles
Year	Venue	Opponent	Score	Result
2016	Multipurpose Hall SAI–SAG Centre; Shillong, India	(India) P. V. Sindhu	21–11, 22–20	Gold

=== BWF Grand Prix (1 title) ===
The BWF Grand Prix had two levels, the Grand Prix and Grand Prix Gold. It was a series of badminton tournaments sanctioned by the Badminton World Federation (BWF) and played between 2007 and 2017.

Women's singles
Year	Tournament	Opponent	Score	Result
2016	Russian Open	(Russia) Evgeniya Kosetskaya	21–10, 21–13	(gold) Winner

BWF Grand Prix Gold tournament
BWF Grand Prix tournament

=== BWF International Challenge/Series (5 titles, 4 runners-up) ===
Women's singles
Year	Tournament	Opponent	Score	Result
2014	Tata Open India International	(India) Arundhati Pantawane	19–21, 21–18, 21–14	(gold) Winner
2015	Bangladesh International	(United States) Iris Wang	23–21, 19–21, 21–18	(gold) Winner
2016	India International	(India) Rituparna Das	7–11, 11–8, 7–11, 12–14	(silver) Runner-up
2017	Tata Open India International	(India) Riya Mookerjee	21–12, 23–21	(gold) Winner
2022 (I)	India International	(Japan) Miho Kayama	11–21, 11–21	(silver) Runner-up
2022 (III)	India International	(India) Tanya Hemanth	19–21, 21–17, 19–21	(silver) Runner-up

Mixed doubles
Year	Tournament	Partner	Opponent	Score	Result
2024	Turkey International	(India) Rohan Kapoor	(France) Julien Maio (France) Léa Palermo	15–21, 13–21	(silver) Runner-up
2024 (I)	India International	(India) Rohan Kapoor	(India) Hariharan Amsakarunan (India) Tanisha Crasto	21–17, 21–19	(gold) Winner
2024 (II)	India International	(India) Rohan Kapoor	(India) Ashith Surya (India) Amrutha Pramuthesh	21–16, 19–21, 21–12	(gold) Winner

BWF International Challenge tournament
BWF International Series tournament
BWF Future Series tournament

=== BWF Junior International (6 titles) ===
Girls' singles
Year	Tournament	Opponent	Score	Result
2011	Ramenskoe Junior International	(Russia) Evgeniya Kosetskaya	21–17, 22–20	(gold) Winner
2012	India Junior International	(India) Rituparna Das	21–19, 21–14	(gold) Winner
2013	India Junior International	(Singapore) Liang Xiaoyu	16–21, 21–16, 21–13	(gold) Winner
2014	India Junior International	(India) K. Reshma	11–3, 11–1, 11–9	(gold) Winner
2015	India Junior International	(Thailand) Supamart Mingchua	21–9, 21–6	(gold) Winner

Girls' doubles
Year	Tournament	Partner	Opponent	Score	Result
2012	India Junior International	(India) Poorvisha S. Ram	(India) Meghana Jakkampudi (India) K. Maneesha	21–12, 18–21, 21–19	(gold) Winner

BWF Junior International Grand Prix tournament
BWF Junior International Challenge tournament
BWF Junior International Series tournament
BWF Junior Future Series tournament

== Career overview ==
Singles	Played	Wins	Losses	Balance
Total*	217	142	75	+67
Current year (2024)*	0	0	0	0

Doubles	Played	Wins	Losses	Balance
Total*	17	9	8	+1
Current year (2024)*	2	1	1	0

Mixed Doubles	Played	Wins	Losses	Balance
Total*	45	31	14	+17
Current year (2024)*	37	26	11	+15

== Personal life ==
Ruthvika Shivani has been employed with Bharat Petroleum Corporation Limited (BPCL) since 23 November 2015. Now she is in Assistant Manager (SPORTS) post at Hyderabad, Telangana office
