= Yana Molodezki =

Israeli badminton player (born 1996)

Yana Molodetsky
Personal information
- Born: יאנה מולודצקי; 7 June 1996 (age 30)

Sport
- Country: Israel
- Sport: Badminton

Women's singles & doubles
- Highest ranking: 366 (WS 20 August 2015); 555 (WD 6 October 2016); 447 (XD 30 October 2014)
- BWF profile

Yana Molodezki (Hebrew: יאנה מולודצקי; born 1 January 1996) is an Israeli badminton player.

== Achievements ==
=== BWF International Challenge/Series ===
Women's doubles
Year	Tournament	Partner	Opponent	Score	Result
2016	Hatzor International	(Israel) Dana Kugel	(Russia) Irina Shorokhova (Russia) Kristina Virvich	12–21, 15–21	(silver) Runner-up

BWF International Challenge tournament
BWF International Series tournament
BWF Future Series tournament
