= Yusuke Onodera =

Japanese badminton player (born 1995)

Yūsuke Onodera
Personal information
- Born: 19 July 1995 (age 31) Nishitōkyō, Tokyo, Japan
- Height: 1.71 m (5 ft 7 in)
- Weight: 63 kg (139 lb)

Sport
- Country: Japan
- Sport: Badminton
- Handedness: Right
- Retired: 31 March 2022.

Men's singles
- Highest ranking: 95 (22 October 2019)
- BWF profile
Medal record
Men's badminton
Representing Japan
Asian Junior Championships
Bronze medal – third place	2013 Kota Kinabalu	Mixed team

Yusuke Onodera (小野寺 裕介, Onodera Yūsuke; born 19 July 1995) is a Japanese badminton player. He graduated at Saitama Sakae High School, and represented the national junior team at the 2013 Asian Junior Championships, where the team captured the bronze medal. He joined the Unisys team in April 2014, and won his first international title at the 2016 Peru International Series.

== Personal life ==
Yusuke Onodera is the elder brother of Masayuki Onodera, a badminton player for BIPROGY.

== Achievements ==
=== BWF World Tour (1 runner-up) ===
The BWF World Tour, announced on 19 March 2017 and implemented in 2018, is a series of elite badminton tournaments, sanctioned by Badminton World Federation (BWF). The BWF World Tour are divided into six levels, namely World Tour Finals, Super 1000, Super 750, Super 500, Super 300 (part of the HSBC World Tour), and the BWF Tour Super 100.

Men's singles
Year	Tournament	Level	Opponent	Score	Result	Ref.
2019	Dutch Open	Super 100	(India) Lakshya Sen	21–15, 14–21, 15–21	(silver) Runner-up	

=== BWF International Challenge/Series (2 titles, 1 runner-up) ===
Men's singles
Year	Tournament	Opponent	Score	Result	Ref.
2016	Peru International Series	(Italy) Indra Bagus Ade Chandra	21–9, 21–10	(gold) Winner	
2019	Sydney International	(Malaysia) Lim Chong King	21–8, 21–15	(gold) Winner	
2019	Dubai International	(Japan) Kodai Naraoka	14–21, 17–21	(silver) Runner-up	

BWF International Challenge tournament
BWF International Series tournament
