= Dana Kugel =

Israeli badminton player

Dana Kugel דנה קוגל
Personal information
- Born: 26 June 1997 (age 29)

Sport
- Country: Israel
- Sport: Badminton

Women's
- Highest ranking: 307 (WS) 23 Oct 2014; 555 (WD) 6 Oct 2016; 448 (XD) 18 Sep 2014
- BWF profile

Dana Kugel (Hebrew: דנה קוגל; born 26 June 1997) is an Israeli female badminton player.

She won a silver medal at the 2017 Maccabiah Games.

== Achievements ==
=== BWF International Challenge/Series ===
Women's Doubles
Year	Tournament	Partner	Opponent	Score	Result
2016	Hatzor International	(Israel) Yana Molodezki	(Russia) Irina Shorokhova (Russia) Kristina Virvich	12-21, 15–21	(silver) Runner-up

Mixed Doubles
Year	Tournament	Partner	Opponent	Score	Result
2015	Hatzor International	(Israel) Lior Kroyter	(Israel) Ariel Shainski (Belarus) Kristina Silich	10-21, 3-21	(silver) Runner-up

BWF International Challenge tournament
BWF International Series tournament
BWF Future Series tournament
