= Daria Serebriakova =

Russian badminton player (born 1995)

Personal information
- Born: Daria Pavlovna Serebriakova (Дарья Павловна Серебрякова); 23 April 1995 (age 31) Orekhovo-Zuyevo, Moscow, Russia

Sport
- Country: Russia
- Sport: Badminton

Women's singles & doubles
- Highest ranking: 434 (WS, 9 July 2015); 91 (WD, 30 June 2016); 229 (XD, 30 June 2016)
- BWF profile

Daria Pavlovna Serebriakova (Russian: Дарья Павловна Серебрякова; born 23 April 1995) is a Russian badminton player.

== Achievements ==
=== BWF International Challenge/Series (1 title, 2 runners-up) ===
Women's doubles
Year	Tournament	Partner	Opponent	Score	Result
2016	Croatian International	(Russia) Ekaterina Kut	(Russia) Ekaterina Bolotova (Russia) Anastasiia Semenova	14–21, 9–21	(silver) Runner-up
2016	Lithuanian International	(Russia) Ekaterina Kut	(Russia) Ksenia Evgenova (Russia) Elena Komendrovskaja	16–21, 8–21	(silver) Runner-up
2017	Hellas International	(Russia) Ekaterina Kut	(Romania) Madalina Ilie (Romania) Milu Luiza	21–12, 21–7	(gold) Winner

BWF International Challenge tournament
BWF International Series tournament
BWF Future Series tournament
