= Evgeniya Kosetskaya =

Russian badminton player (born 1994)

Evgeniya Kosetskaya Евгения Косецкая
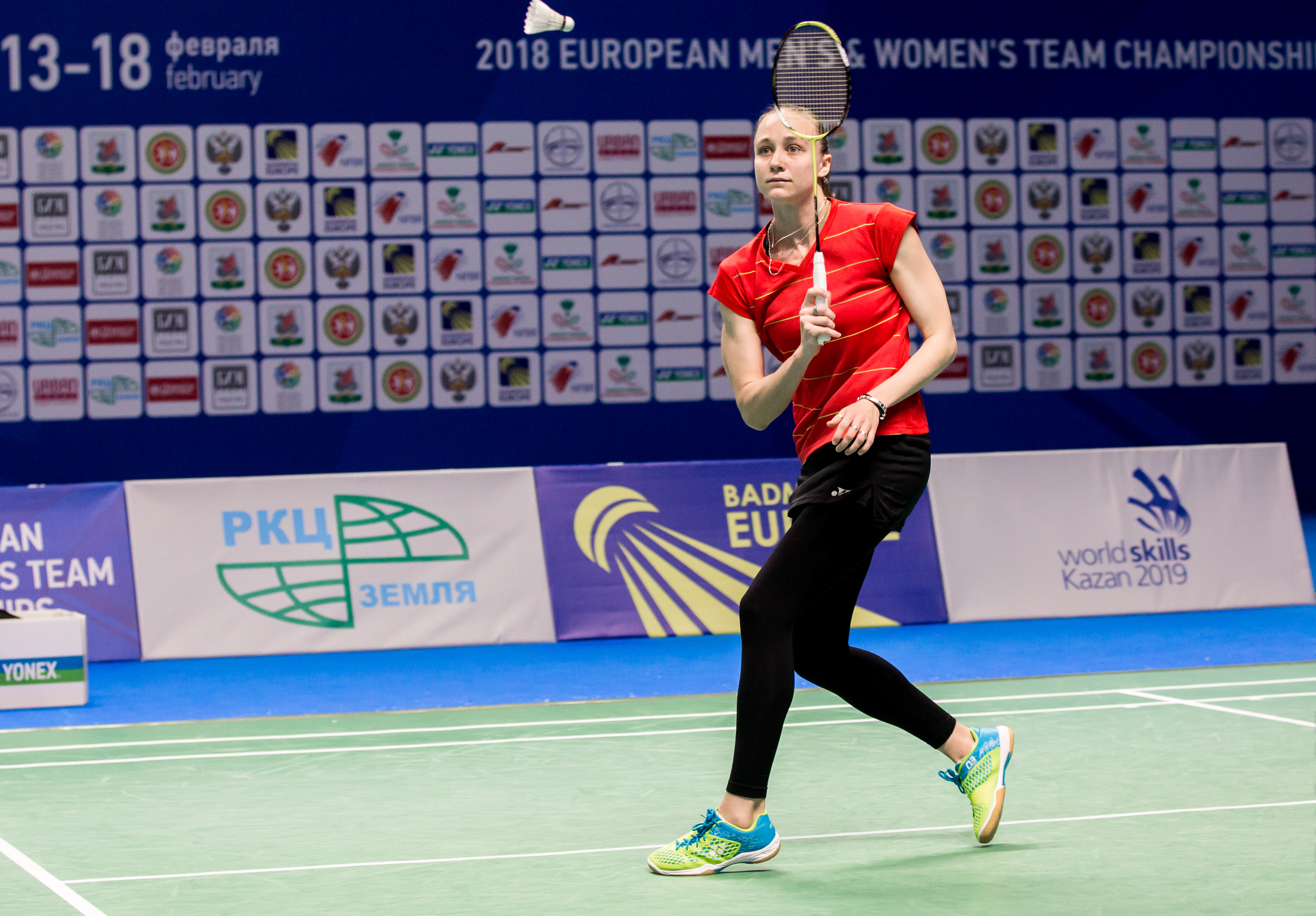
- Kosetskaya at the 2018 Kazan European women's team championships

Personal information
- Born: Evgeniya Andreevna Kosetskaya (Евгения Андреевна Косецкая); 16 December 1994 (age 31) Chelyabinsk, Russia
- Years active: 2007–now
- Height: 1.76 m (5 ft 9 in)
- Weight: 63 kg (139 lb)

Sport
- Country: Russia
- Sport: Badminton
- Handedness: Right
- Coached by: Igor Nazarov

Women's singles & doubles
- Highest ranking: 20 (WS, 21 June 2018); 21 (WD, 18 June 2015)
- BWF profile
Medal record
Women's badminton
Representing Russia
European Games
Silver medal – second place	2015 Baku	Women's doubles
Bronze medal – third place	2019 Minsk	Women's singles
European Championships
Silver medal – second place	2018 Huelva	Women's singles
European Mixed Team Championships
Silver medal – second place	2017 Lubin	Mixed team
Bronze medal – third place	2015 Leuven	Mixed team
Bronze medal – third place	2019 Copenhagen	Mixed team
Bronze medal – third place	2021 Vantaa	Mixed team
European Women's Team Championships
Silver medal – second place	2014 Basel	Women's team
Bronze medal – third place	2018 Kazan	Women's team
European Junior Championships
Silver medal – second place	2011 Vantaa	Mixed team
Bronze medal – third place	2013 Ankara	Girls' doubles

Evgeniya Andreevna Kosetskaya (Russian: Евгения Андреевна Косецкая; born 16 December 1994) is a Russian badminton player. She was the women's doubles silver medalist at the 2015 Baku European Games, and settled the women's singles bronze medal in 2019 Minsk. She competed at the 2020 Tokyo Olympics.

== Achievements ==
=== European Games ===
Women's singles
Year	Venue	Opponent	Score	Result
2019	Falcon Club; Minsk, Belarus	(Denmark) Mia Blichfeldt	14–21, 11–21	Bronze

Women's doubles
Year	Venue	Partner	Opponent	Score	Result
2015	Baku Sports Hall; Baku, Azerbaijan	(Russia) Ekaterina Bolotova	(Bulgaria) Gabriela Stoeva (Bulgaria) Stefani Stoeva	12–21, 21–23	Silver

=== European Championships ===
Women's singles
Year	Venue	Opponent	Score	Result
2018	Palacio de los Deportes Carolina Marín; Huelva, Spain	(Spain) Carolina Marín	15–21, 7–21	Silver

=== European Junior Championships ===
Girls' doubles
Year	Venue	Partner	Opponent	Score	Result
2013	ASKI Sport Hall; Ankara, Turkey	(Russia) Victoria Dergunova	(Bulgaria) Gabriela Stoeva (Bulgaria) Stefani Stoeva	21–19, 16–21, 16–21	Bronze

=== BWF World Tour (1 runner-up) ===
The BWF World Tour, which was announced on 19 March 2017 and implemented in 2018, is a series of elite badminton tournaments sanctioned by the Badminton World Federation (BWF). The BWF World Tour is divided into levels of World Tour Finals, Super 1000, Super 750, Super 500, Super 300 (part of the HSBC World Tour), and the BWF Tour Super 100.

Women's singles
Year	Tournament	Level	Opponent	Score	Result
2019	Dutch Open	Super 100	(China) Wang Zhiyi	14–21, 18–21	(silver) Runner-up

=== BWF Grand Prix (1 title, 3 runners-up) ===
The BWF Grand Prix had two levels, the Grand Prix and Grand Prix Gold. It was a series of badminton tournaments sanctioned by the Badminton World Federation (BWF) and played between 2007 and 2017.

Women's singles
Year	Tournament	Opponent	Score	Result
2016	Russian Open	(India) Gadde Ruthvika Shivani	10–21, 13–21	(silver) Runner-up
2017	Russian Open	(Malaysia) Soniia Cheah	11–9, 5–11, 11–5, 5–11, 11–4	(gold) Winner

Women's doubles
Year	Tournament	Partner	Opponent	Score	Result
2014	Bitburger Open	(Russia) Ekaterina Bolotova	(China) Ou Dongni (China) Yu Xiaohan	10–21, 18–21	(silver) Runner-up
2016	Russian Open	(Russia) Ksenia Polikarpova	(Russia) Anastasia Chervyakova (Russia) Olga Morozova	14–21, 20–22	(silver) Runner-up

BWF Grand Prix Gold tournament
BWF Grand Prix tournament

=== BWF International Challenge/Series (14 titles, 6 runners-up) ===
Women's singles
Year	Tournament	Opponent	Score	Result
2014	Estonian International	(Ukraine) Marija Ulitina	21–16, 23–21	(gold) Winner
2015	Kazakhstan International	(Belgium) Lianne Tan	21–17, 21–10	(gold) Winner
2016	South Africa International	(Egypt) Hadia Hosny	21–8, 21–10	(gold) Winner
2016	Botswana International	(Egypt) Hadia Hosny	21–8, 21–13	(gold) Winner
2017	Spanish International	(Denmark) Mia Blichfeldt	12–21, 12–21	(silver) Runner-up
2017	White Nights	(Turkey) Neslihan Yiğit	21–8, 15–21, 22–20	(gold) Winner
2019	White Nights	(Japan) Yukino Nakai	24–22, 21–12	(gold) Winner

Women's doubles
Year	Tournament	Partner	Opponent	Score	Result
2010	Cyprus International	(Russia) Romina Gabdullina	(Denmark) Lena Grebak (Denmark) Camilla Overgaard	21–18, 21–9	(gold) Winner
2012	White Nights	(Russia) Viktoriia Vorobeva	(Russia) Tatjana Bibik (Russia) Anastasia Chervyakova	Walkover	(silver) Runner-up
2014	White Nights	(Russia) Ekaterina Bolotova	(Russia) Olga Golovanova (Russia) Viktoriia Vorobeva	21–14, 26–24	(gold) Winner
2014	Bahrain International Challenge	(Russia) Ekaterina Bolotova	(Russia) Anastasia Chervyakova (Russia) Nina Vislova	21–6, 21–15	(gold) Winner
2015	White Nights	(Russia) Ekaterina Bolotova	(Turkey) Özge Bayrak (Turkey) Neslihan Yiğit	20–22, 21–13, 21–15	(gold) Winner
2016	Austrian Open	(Russia) Ekaterina Bolotova	(United States) Eva Lee (United States) Paula Lynn Obañana	21–11, 23–21	(gold) Winner

Mixed doubles
Year	Tournament	Partner	Opponent	Score	Result
2014	Estonian International	(Russia) Anatoliy Yartsev	(Russia) Vitalij Durkin (Russia) Nina Vislova	9–21, 12–21	(silver) Runner-up
2014	Czech International	(Russia) Anatoliy Yartsev	(Sweden) Jonathan Nordh (Sweden) Emelie Fabbeke	21–18, 19–21, 19–21	(silver) Runner-up
2015	Finnish Open	(Russia) Anatoliy Yartsev	(France) Gaëtan Mittelheisser (France) Audrey Fontaine	21–16, 17–21, 21–10	(gold) Winner
2015	Kazakhstan International	(Russia) Anatoliy Yartsev	(Malaysia) Bolriffin Khairul Tor (Malaysia) Ng Sin Er	21–11, 21–12	(gold) Winner
2016	Bahrain International Challenge	(Russia) Anatoliy Yartsev	(Russia) Evgenij Dremin (Russia) Evgenia Dimova	15–21, 11–21	(silver) Runner-up
2016	South Africa International	(Russia) Anatoliy Yartsev	(South Africa) Andries Malan (South Africa) Sandra le Grange	21–13, 21–9	(gold) Winner
2016	Botswana International	(Russia) Anatoliy Yartsev	(Mauritius) Julien Paul (Egypt) Hadia Hosny	21–12, 21–10	(gold) Winner
2017	Estonian International	(Russia) Anatoliy Yartsev	(Russia) Rodion Alimov (Russia) Alina Davletova	8–21, 19–21	(silver) Runner-up

BWF International Challenge tournament
BWF International Series tournament
BWF Future Series tournament
