= Ekaterina Kut =

Russian badminton player (born 1996)

Personal information
- Born: Ekaterina Vyacheslavovna Kut; Екатерина Вячеславовна Кут; 4 March 1996 (age 30) Orekhovo-Zuyevo, Moscow, Russia

Sport
- Country: Russia
- Sport: Badminton

Women's singles & doubles
- Highest ranking: 346 (WS, 20 August 2015); 91 (WD, 30 June 2016); 213 (XD, 30 June 2016)
- BWF profile

Ekaterina Vyacheslavovna Kut (Russian: Екатерина Вячеславовна Кут; born 4 March 1996) is a Russian badminton player.

== Achievements ==
=== BWF International Challenge/Series (1 title, 2 runners-up) ===
Women's doubles
Year	Tournament	Partner	Opponent	Score	Result
2016	Croatian International	(Russia) Daria Serebriakova	(Russia) Ekaterina Bolotova (Russia) Anastasiia Semenova	14–21, 9–21	(silver) Runner-up
2016	Lithuanian International	(Russia) Daria Serebriakova	(Russia) Ksenia Evgenova (Russia) Elena Komendrovskaja	16–21, 8–21	(silver) Runner-up
2017	Hellas International	(Russia) Daria Serebriakova	(Romania) Madalina Ilie (Romania) Milu Luiza	21–12, 21–7	(gold) Winner

BWF International Challenge tournament
BWF International Series tournament
BWF Future Series tournament
