= Kristina Silich =

Belarusian badminton player (born 1990)

Personal information
- Born: 15 May 1990 (age 36)

Sport
- Country: Belarus
- Sport: Badminton

Women's singles & doubles
- Highest ranking: 168 (WS 19 October 2017); 254 (WD 7 October 2000); 148 (XD 9 November 2017)
- BWF profile

Kristina Silich (Belarusian: Крысціна Сяргееўна Сіліч, Russian: Кристина Сергеевна Силич; born 15 May 1990) is a Belarusian badminton player.

== Achievements ==
=== BWF International Challenge/Series (5 titles, 1 runner-up) ===
Women's doubles
| Year | Tournament | Partner | Opponent | Score | Result |
|---|---|---|---|---|---|
| 2016 | Egypt International | (Lithuania) Gerda Voitechovskaja | (Egypt) Nadine Ashraf (Egypt) Menna El-Tanany | 21–7, 21–14 | (gold) Winner |
| 2018 | Hellas International | (Thailand) Porntip Buranaprasertsuk | (England) Abigail Holden (England) Fee Teng Liew | 21–9, 21–19 | (gold) Winner |
| 2018 | Hatzor International | (Israel) Ksenia Polikarpova | (Slovenia) Iza Šalehar (Slovenia) Lia Šalehar | 21–16, 23–25, 22–20 | (gold) Winner |

Mixed doubles
| Year | Tournament | Partner | Opponent | Score | Result |
|---|---|---|---|---|---|
| 2015 | Hatzor International | (Israel) Ariel Shainski | (Israel) Lior Kroyter (Israel) Dana Kugel | 21–10, 21–3 | (gold) Winner |
| 2016 | Egypt International | (Belarus) Uladzimir Varantsou | (Egypt) Ahmed Salah (Egypt) Menna El-Tanany | 14–21, 10–21 | (silver) Runner-up |
| 2016 | Hatzor International | (Israel) Ariel Shainski | (Russia) Aleksandr Vasilkin (Russia) Kristina Vyrvich | 19–21, 21–18, 21–13 | (gold) Winner |

BWF International Challenge tournament
BWF International Series tournament
BWF Future Series tournament
