= Irina Shorokhova =

Russian badminton player (born 1997)

Personal information
- Born: Irina Andreevna Shorokhova (Ирина Андреевна Шорохова); 12 January 1997 (age 29)

Sport
- Country: Russia
- Sport: Badminton

Women's singles & doubles
- Highest ranking: 830 (WS, 24 July 2014); 443 (WD, 14 August 2014)
- BWF profile

Irina Andreevna Shorokhova (Russian: Ирина Андреевна Шорохова; born 12 January 1997) is a Russian badminton player.

== Achievements ==
=== BWF International Challenge/Series ===
Women's singles
Year	Tournament	Opponent	Score	Result
2016	Hatzor International	(Slovenia) Ana Marija Šetina	16–21, 14–21	(silver) Runner-up

Women's doubles
Year	Tournament	Partner	Opponent	Score	Result
2016	Hatzor International	(Russia) Kristina Vyrvich	(Israel) Dana Kugel (Israel) Yana Molodezki	21–12, 21–15	(gold) Winner

BWF International Challenge tournament
BWF International Series tournament
BWF Future Series tournament
