= Indra Bagus Ade Chandra =

Indonesian-born badminton player

Personal information
- Born: 13 July 1987 (age 39) Jakarta, Indonesia

Sport
- Country: Indonesia; Italy
- Sport: Badminton
- Handedness: Right

Men's singles & doubles
- Highest ranking: 65 (MS 22 December 2016); 211 (MD 30 April 2015)
- BWF profile

Indra Bagus Ade Chandra (born 13 July 1987) is an Indonesian badminton player who later represented Italy. He is currently the coach of the Belgium national badminton team.

== Achievements ==
=== BWF International Challenge/Series (4 titles, 6 runners-up) ===
Men's singles
Year	Tournament	Opponent	Score	Result
2010	Swedish International	(Denmark) Viktor Axelsen	21–15, 21–12	(gold) Winner
2013	Czech International	(India) Anup Sridhar	11–21, 16–21	(silver) Runner-up
2013	Italian International	(Indonesia) Andre Kurniawan Tedjono	19–21, 21–15, 21–12	(gold) Winner
2014	Italian International	(Indonesia) Andre Kurniawan Tedjono	21–15, 18–21, 18–21	(silver) Runner-up
2015	Romanian International	(Indonesia) Adi Pratama	10–12, 6–11, 9–11	(silver) Runner-up
2015	Zambia International	(Iran) Soroush Eskandari	19–21, 21–14, 19–21	(silver) Runner-up
2016	Manhattan Beach International	(Mexico) Job Castillo	21–19, 21–12	(gold) Winner
2016	Peru International Series	(Japan) Yusuke Onodera	9–21, 10–21	(silver) Runner-up
2016	Tahiti International	(Czech Republic) Milan Ludík	24–22, 18–21, 21–9	(gold) Winner
2016	Italian International	(Sweden) Henri Hurskainen	20–22, 13–21	(silver) Runner-up

BWF International Challenge tournament
BWF International Series tournament
BWF Future Series tournament
