= Anastasiia Semenova =

Russian badminton player (born 1999)

Anastasiia Semenova Анастасия Семенова
Personal information
- Born: Anastasiia Vladimirovna Semenova (Анастасия Владимировна Семенова); 12 March 1999 (age 27)

Sport
- Country: Russia
- Sport: Badminton
- Coached by: I. R. Sukhacheva; Klaudia Mayorova

Women's singles & doubles
- Highest ranking: 141 (WS 22 November 2018); 159 (WD 29 November 2018); 127 (XD 22 November 2018)
- BWF profile
Medal record
Women's badminton
Representing Russia
European Mixed Team Championships
Bronze medal – third place	2019 Copenhagen	Mixed team
European Women's Team Championships
Bronze medal – third place	2018 Kazan	Women's team
European Junior Championships
Silver medal – second place	2017 Mulhouse	Mixed team

Anastasiia Vladimirovna Semenova (Russian: Анастасия Владимировна Семенова; born 12 March 1999) is a Russian badminton player. She won her first international tournament in Lithuanian International tournament in the women's doubles event partnered with senior player Ekaterina Bolotova. In the singles event, she won the 2017 Hatzor International tournament in Israel, also doubles up her title in the women's doubles event with Ksenia Evgenova. Semenova was part of the Russian junior team that won the silver medal at the 2017 Mulhouse European Junior Championships.

== Achievements ==
=== BWF International Challenge/Series (4 titles, 1 runner-up) ===
Women's singles
Year	Tournament	Opponent	Score	Result
2017	Hatzor International	(Lithuania) Akvilė Stapušaitytė	21–12, 21–8	(gold) Winner
2018	Belarus International	(France) Marie Batomene	23–25, 15–21	(silver) Runner-up

Women's doubles
Year	Tournament	Partner	Opponent	Score	Result
2016	Lithuanian International	(Russia) Ekaterina Bolotova	(Russia) Ekaterina Kut (Russia) Daria Serebriakova	21–14, 21–9	(gold) Winner
2017	Hatzor International	(Russia) Ksenia Evgenova	(Cyprus) Eleni Christodoulou (Cyprus) Anastasia Zintsidou	21–16, 15–21, 21–11	(gold) Winner
2018	Croatian International	(Russia) Ksenia Evgenova	(France) Marion Le Turdu (France) Mélanie Potin	19–21, 21–11, 21–14	(gold) Winner

BWF International Challenge tournament
BWF International Series tournament
BWF Future Series tournament
