= Ksenia Evgenova =

Russian badminton player (born 1996)

Ksenia Evgenova Ксения Евгенова
Personal information
- Born: Ксения Александровна Евгенова; 19 April 1996 (age 30) Zhukovsky, Moscow, Russia

Sport
- Country: Russia
- Sport: Badminton
- Coached by: V.A. Degtyarev

Women's singles & doubles
- Highest ranking: 133 (WS 10 May 2018); 86 (WD with Maria Shegurova 25 May 2017); 334 (XD with Ilya Zhdanov 13 July 2017)
- BWF profile
Medal record
Women's badminton
Representing Russia
European Women's Team Championships
Bronze medal – third place	2018 Kazan	Women's team

Ksenia Aleksandrovna Evgenova (Russian: Ксения Александровна Евгенова; born 19 April 1996) is a Russian badminton player. In the national event, she plays for the Sdyusshor, and in 2017, she was the semi-finalist at the National Championships in the women's doubles event partnered with Maria Shegurova.

== Achievements ==
=== BWF International Challenge/Series ===
Women's doubles
Year	Tournament	Partner	Opponent	Score	Result
2016	Latvia International	(Russia) Maria Shegurova	(Belarus) Anastasiya Cherniavskaya (Belarus) Alesia Zaitsava	16–21, 21–10, 21–7	(gold) Winner
2016	Croatian International	(Russia) Elena Komendrovskaja	(Russia) Ekaterina Kut (Russia) Daria Serebriakova	21–16, 21–8	(gold) Winner
2017	Hatzor International	(Russia) Anastasiia Semenova	(Cyprus) Eleni Christodoulou (Cyprus) Anastasia Zintsidou	21–16, 15–21, 21–11	(gold) Winner
2018	Croatian International	(Russia) Anastasiia Semenova	(France) Marion Le Turdu (France) Mélanie Potin	19–21, 21–11, 21–14	(gold) Winner

Mixed doubles
Year	Tournament	Partner	Opponent	Score	Result
2016	Bulgaria International	(Russia) Andrei Ivanov	(Russia) Rodion Alimov (Russia) Alina Davletova	Walkover	(silver) Runner-up

BWF International Challenge tournament
BWF International Series tournament
BWF Future Series tournament
