= Elena Komendrovskaja =

Russian badminton player (born 1991)

Elena Komendrovskaja Елена Комендровская
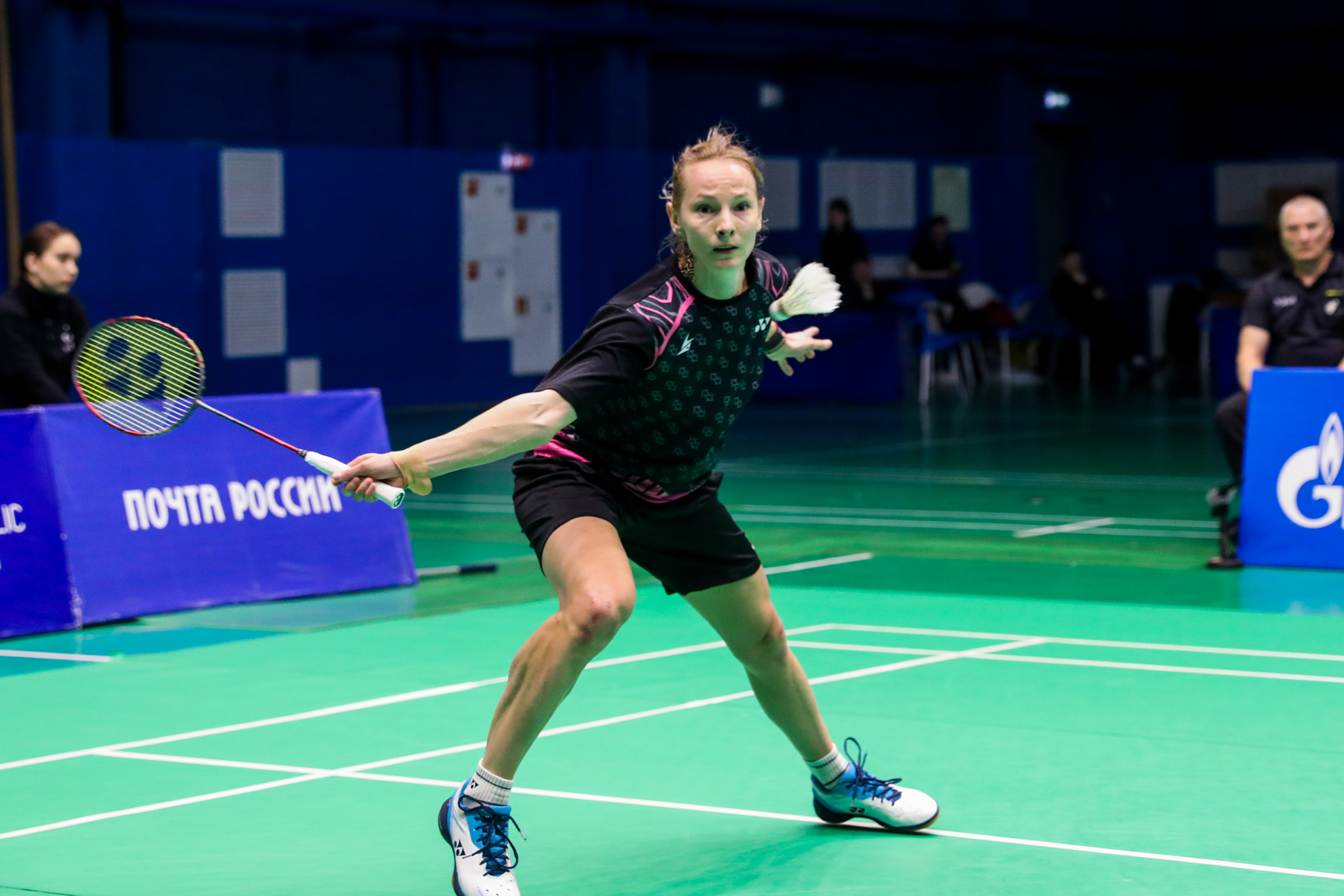

Personal information
- Born: Elena Sergeevna Komendrovskaja (Елена Сергеевна Комендровская); 19 May 1991 (age 35) Perm, Russia

Sport
- Country: Russia
- Sport: Badminton
- Coached by: AM Ponomarev, AV Loginov

Women's singles & doubles
- Highest ranking: 93 (WS, 13 October 2016); 55 (WD, 2 July 2015); 274 (XD, 21 June 2016)
- BWF profile
Medal record
Women's badminton
Representing Russia
European Women's Team Championships
Bronze medal – third place	2018 Kazan	Women's team
European Junior Championships
Bronze medal – third place	2009 Milan	Girls' doubles

Elena Sergeevna Komendrovskaja (Russian: Елена Сергеевна Комендровская; born 19 May 1991) is a Russian badminton player.

== Achievements ==
=== European Junior Championships ===
Girls' doubles
Year	Venue	Partner	Opponent	Score	Result
2009	Federal Technical Centre - Palabadminton; Milan, Italy	(Russia) Ksenia Polikarpova	(Netherlands) Selena Piek (Netherlands) Iris Tabeling	19–21, 15–21	Bronze

=== BWF International Challenge/Series ===
Women's singles
Year	Tournament	Opponent	Score	Result
2015	Croatian International	(Russia) Olga Golovanova	21–9, 21–18	(gold) Winner
2016	Croatian International	(Belarus) Alesia Zaitsava	21–13, 21–19	(gold) Winner
2016	Latvia International	(Belarus) Alesia Zaitsava	21–17, 21–15	(gold) Winner
2016	Lithuanian International	(Denmark) Irina Amalie Andersen	21–12, 21–13	(gold) Winner

Women's doubles
Year	Tournament	Partner	Opponent	Score	Result
2014	Hellas International	(Russia) Viktoriia Vorobeva	(Turkey) Özge Bayrak (Turkey) Neslihan Yiğit	7–21, 14–21	(silver) Runner-up
2014	Czech International	(Russia) Irina Khlebko	(Canada) Rachel Honderich (Canada) Michelle Li	7–21, 14–21	(silver) Runner-up
2014	Finnish International	(Russia) Irina Khlebko	(Russia) Victoria Dergunova (Russia) Olga Morozova	11–21, 15–21	(silver) Runner-up
2016	Croatian International	(Russia) Ksenia Evgenova	(Russia) Ekaterina Kut (Russia) Daria Serebriakova	21–16, 21–8	(gold) Winner
2017	Hungarian International	(Russia) Maria Shegurova	(Russia) Ekaterina Bolotova (Russia) Alina Davletova	13–21, 19–21	(silver) Runner-up

BWF International Challenge tournament
BWF International Series tournament
BWF Future Series tournament
