= Maria Shegurova =

Russian badminton player (born 1993)

Personal information
- Born: Maria Sergeevna Shegurova; Мария Сергеевна Шегурова; 8 June 1993 (age 33) Perm, Russia

Sport
- Country: Russia
- Sport: Badminton

Women's singles & doubles
- Highest ranking: 395 (WS, 24 October 2013); 177 (WD, 12 September 2013); 184 (XD, 18 August 2016)
- BWF profile

Maria Sergeevna Shegurova (Russian: Мария Сергеевна Шегурова; born 8 June 1993) is a Russian badminton player.

== Achievements ==
=== BWF International Challenge/Series ===
Women's doubles
Year	Tournament	Partner	Opponent	Score	Result
2016	Latvia International	(Russia) Ksenia Evgenova	(Belarus) Anastasiya Cherniavskaya (Belarus) Alesia Zaitsava	16–21, 21–10, 21–7	(gold) Winner
2017	Hungarian International	(Russia) Elena Komendrovskaja	(Russia) Ekaterina Bolotova (Russia) Alina Davletova	13–21, 19–21	(silver) Runner-up

Mixed doubles
Year	Tournament	Partner	Opponent	Score	Result
2016	Latvia International	(Russia) Dmitrii Riabov	(France) Thom Gicquel (France) Léonice Huet	15–21, 21–18, 15–21	(silver) Runner-up

BWF International Challenge tournament
BWF International Series tournament
BWF Future Series tournament
