= Kristina Vyrvich =

Russian badminton player (born 1997)

Personal information
- Born: Kristina Andreevna Vyrvich (Кристина Андреевна Вырвич); 14 February 1997 (age 29)

Sport
- Country: Russia
- Sport: Badminton

Women's & mixed doubles
- Highest ranking: 169 (WD, 27 October 2016); 229 (XD, 13 October 2016)
- BWF profile

Kristina Andreevna Vyrvich (Russian: Кристина Андреевна Вырвич; born 14 February 1997) is a Russian badminton player.

== Achievements ==
=== BWF International Challenge/Series ===
Women's doubles
Year	Tournament	Partner	Opponent	Score	Result
2016	Hatzor International	(Russia) Irina Shorokhova	(Israel) Dana Kugel (Israel) Yana Molodezki	21–12, 21–15	(gold) Winner

Mixed doubles
Year	Tournament	Partner	Opponent	Score	Result
2016	Hatzor International	(Russia) Aleksandr Vasilkin	(Israel) Ariel Shainski (Belarus) Kristina Silich	21–19, 18–21, 13–21	(silver) Runner-up

BWF International Challenge tournament
BWF International Series tournament
BWF Future Series tournament
