= Ekaterina Malkova =

Russian badminton player (born 1992)

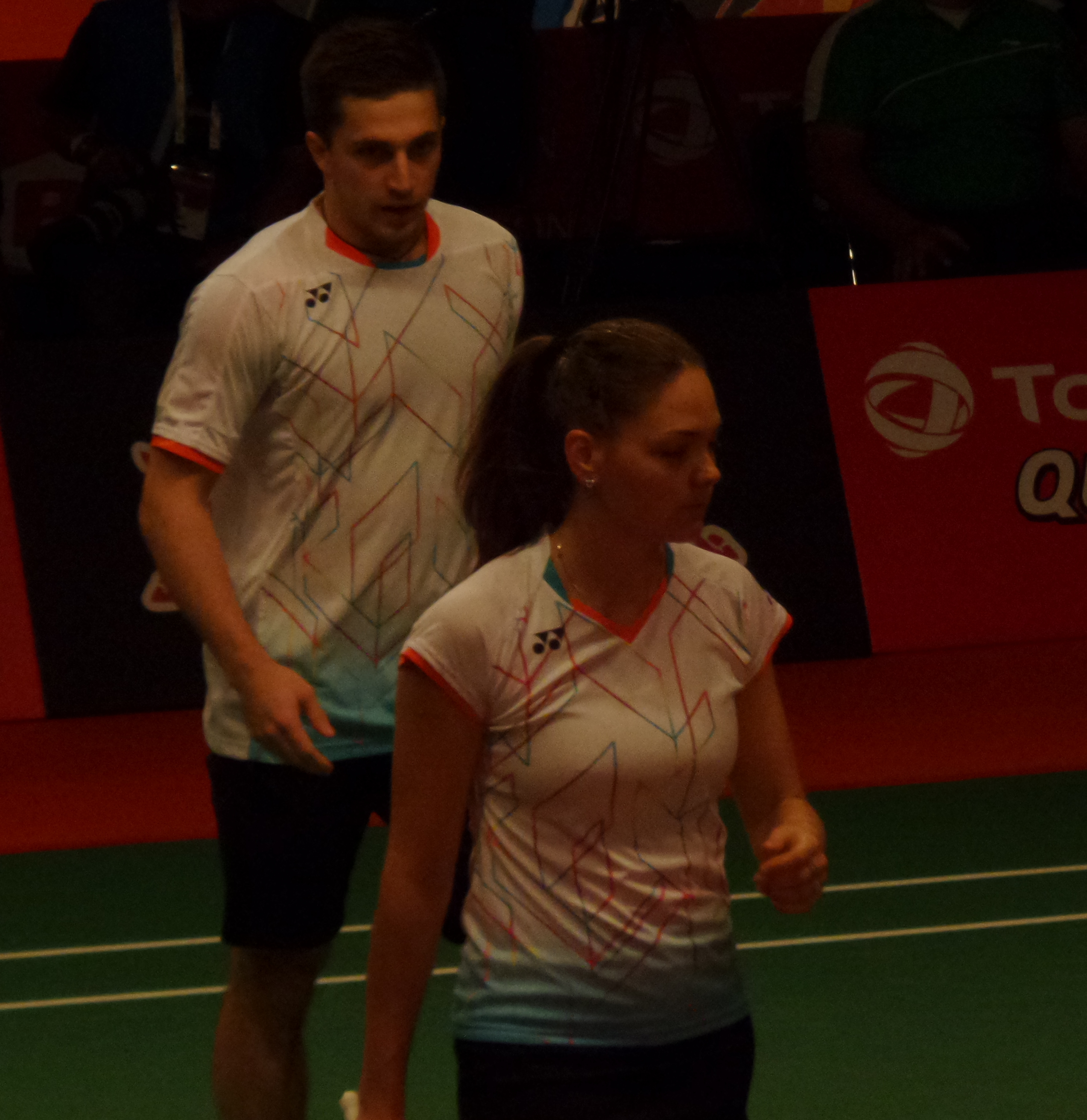
- Malkova with Kargaev at the 2015 BWF World Championships

Personal information
- Born: Екатерина Владимировна Болотова (Ekaterina Vladimirovna Bolotova); 12 December 1992 (age 33) Orekhovo-Zuyevo, Moscow, Russia
- Years active: 2010
- Height: 1.76 m (5 ft 9 in)
- Weight: 67 kg (148 lb)

Sport
- Country: Russia
- Sport: Badminton
- Handedness: Right
- Coached by: Tatiana Ivanova

Women's singles & doubles
- Highest ranking: 141 (WS 25 September 2014); 19 (WD 12 March 2019); 50 (XD 26 March 2015)
- BWF profile
Medal record
Women's badminton
Representing Russia
European Games
Silver medal – second place	2015 Baku	Women's doubles
Bronze medal – third place	2019 Minsk	Women's doubles
European Mixed Team Championships
Silver medal – second place	2017 Lubin	Mixed team
Bronze medal – third place	2015 Leuven	Mixed team
Bronze medal – third place	2019 Copenhagen	Mixed team
European Women's Team Championships
Silver medal – second place	2014 Basel	Women's team
Bronze medal – third place	2018 Kazan	Women's team
European Junior Championships
Silver medal – second place	2011 Vantaa	Mixed team

Ekaterina Vladimirovna Malkova (Russian: Екатерина Владимировна Малькова; born 12 December 1992; née Bolotova) is a Russian badminton player. She was the women's doubles silver medalist at the 2015 Baku European Games with partner Evgeniya Kosetskaya, and later won a bronze medal in 2019 Minsk with Alina Davletova.

== Personal life ==
She is married to Saratov badminton player Vladimir Malkov.

== Achievements ==
=== European Games ===
Women's doubles
Year	Venue	Partner	Opponent	Score	Result
2015	Baku Sports Hall; Baku, Azerbaijan	(Russia) Evgeniya Kosetskaya	(Bulgaria) Gabriela Stoeva (Bulgaria) Stefani Stoeva	12–21, 21–23	Silver
2019	Falcon Club; Minsk, Belarus	(Russia) Alina Davletova	(Netherlands) Selena Piek (Netherlands) Cheryl Seinen	21–18, 20–22, 14–21	Bronze

=== BWF Grand Prix (2 runners-up) ===
The BWF Grand Prix had two levels, the Grand Prix and Grand Prix Gold. It was a series of badminton tournaments sanctioned by the Badminton World Federation (BWF) and played between 2007 and 2017.

Women's doubles
Year	Tournament	Partner	Opponent	Score	Result
2014	Bitburger Open	(Russia) Evgeniya Kosetskaya	(China) Ou Dongni (China) Yu Xiaohan	10–21, 18–21	(silver) Runner-up
2017	Scottish Open	(Russia) Alina Davletova	(Netherlands) Selena Piek (Netherlands) Cheryl Seinen	21–15, 15–21, 11–21	(silver) Runner-up

BWF Grand Prix Gold tournament
BWF Grand Prix tournament

=== BWF International Challenge/Series (14 titles, 4 runners-up) ===
Women's doubles
Year	Tournament	Partner	Opponent	Score	Result
2014	White Nights	(Russia) Evgeniya Kosetskaya	(Russia) Olga Golovanova (Russia) Viktoriia Vorobeva	21–14, 26–24	(gold) Winner
2014	Bahrain International Challenge	(Russia) Evgeniya Kosetskaya	(Russia) Anastasia Chervyakova (Russia) Nina Vislova	21–6, 21–15	(gold) Winner
2015	White Nights	(Russia) Evgeniya Kosetskaya	(Turkey) Özge Bayrak (Turkey) Neslihan Yiğit	20–22, 21–13, 21–15	(gold) Winner
2016	Austrian Open	(Russia) Evgeniya Kosetskaya	(United States) Eva Lee (United States) Paula Lynn Obañana	21–11, 23–21	(gold) Winner
2016	Lithuanian International	(Russia) Anastasiia Semenova	(Russia) Ekaterina Kut (Russia) Daria Serebriakova	21–14, 21–9	(gold) Winner
2017	Hungarian International	(Russia) Alina Davletova	(Russia) Elena Komendrovskaja (Russia) Maria Shegurova	21–13, 21–19	(gold) Winner
2017	Italian International	(Russia) Alina Davletova	(Denmark) Alexandra Bøje (Denmark) Sara Lundgaard	21–18, 21–11	(gold) Winner
2018	Estonian International	(Russia) Alina Davletova	(England) Jessica Hopton (England) Jenny Moore	21–10, 21–10	(gold) Winner
2018	Hungarian International	(Russia) Alina Davletova	(Sweden) Emma Karlsson (Sweden) Johanna Magnusson	21–14, 21–9	(gold) Winner
2018	Italian International	(Russia) Alina Davletova	(Denmark) Julie Finne-Ipsen (Denmark) Mai Surrow	21–13, 14–21, 21–13	(gold) Winner
2019	Azerbaijan International	(Russia) Alina Davletova	(England) Chloe Birch (England) Lauren Smith	18–21, 12–21	(silver) Runner-up
2019	Italian International	(Russia) Alina Davletova	(Bulgaria) Gabriela Stoeva (Bulgaria) Stefani Stoeva	11–21, 14–21	(silver) Runner-up
2022	Iran Fajr International	(Russia) Anastasiia Shapovalova	(Iran) Hajar Kabiri (Iran) Saghar Rafei	21–3, 21–13	(gold) Winner

Mixed doubles
Year	Tournament	Partner	Opponent	Score	Result
2013	Lithuanian International	(Russia) Andrey Ashmarin	(Russia) Yaroslav Egerev (Russia) Irina Khlebko	21–15, 21–14	(gold) Winner
2016	Lithuanian International	(Russia) Denis Grachev	(Poland) Paweł Śmiłowski (Poland) Magdalena Świerczyńska	21–11, 21–16	(gold) Winner
2016	Czech International	(Russia) Vasily Kuznetsov	(Denmark) Mathias Bay-Smidt (Denmark) Alexandra Bøje	19–21, 15–21	(silver) Runner-up
2018	Dubai International	(Russia) Denis Grachev	(South Korea) Yoo Yeon-seong (South Korea) Park So-young	14–21, 21–17, 14–21	(silver) Runner-up
2019	Italian International	(Russia) Vladimir Ivanov	(South Korea) Kim Sa-rang (South Korea) Eom Hye-won	21–12, 18–21, 21–15	(gold) Winner

BWF International Challenge tournament
BWF International Series tournament
BWF Future Series tournament
