= Alina Davletova =

Russian badminton player

Alina Davletova Алина Давлетова
Personal information
- Born: Alina Ilgizarovna Davletova; 17 July 1998 (age 28) Ufa, Russia
- Years active: 2014–present
- Height: 1.63 m (5 ft 4 in)
- Weight: 58 kg (128 lb)

Sport
- Country: Russia
- Sport: Badminton
- Handedness: Right

Women's & mixed doubles
- Highest ranking: 19 (WD with Ekaterina Malkova 12 March 2019); 18 (XD with Rodion Alimov 18 January 2022)
- BWF profile
Medal record
Women's badminton
Representing Russia
European Games
Bronze medal – third place	2019 Minsk	Women's doubles
European Championships
Gold medal – first place	2021 Kyiv	Mixed doubles
European Mixed Team Championships
Silver medal – second place	2017 Lubin	Mixed team
Bronze medal – third place	2019 Copenhagen	Mixed team
Bronze medal – third place	2021 Vantaa	Mixed team
European Women's Team Championships
Bronze medal – third place	2018 Kazan	Women's team
Summer Universiade
Bronze medal – third place	2017 Taipei	Mixed doubles
European Junior Championships
Gold medal – first place	2017 Mulhouse	Mixed doubles
Silver medal – second place	2017 Mulhouse	Mixed team

Alina Ilgizarovna Davletova (Russian: Алина Ильгизаровна Давлетова; born 17 July 1998) is a Russian badminton player. She won the mixed doubles title at the European Junior Championships in 2017 and at the European Championships in 2021.

== Career ==
Davletova who was born in Ufa, started to playing badminton at aged nine. She joined the national team in 2013, and made a debut in 2014. She crowned as mixed doubles champion at the 2016 Bulgaria International tournament, the first senior international title in her career. Davletova who still in the junior age group, was the mixed doubles gold medalist at the 2017 European Junior Championships partnered with Rodion Alimov, made them as the first Russian player to win that category. At the same year, she and Alimov also won the bronze medal at the 2017 Summer Universiade in Taipei. At the 2019 Minsk European Games, she clinched the bronze medal in the women's doubles event partnered with Ekaterina Bolotova. Davletova and Alimov became the first Russians winning the European Championships in mixed doubles, doing so in 2021.

In January 2022, Davletova and Rodion Alimov had to withdraw from the India Open mixed doubles semifinals match after Alimov was tested positive of COVID-19.

At the 2024 BRICS Games Alina Davletova won two medals.

== Achievements ==
=== European Games ===
Women's doubles
Year	Venue	Partner	Opponent	Score	Result
2019	Falcon Club, Minsk, Belarus	(Russia) Ekaterina Bolotova	(Netherlands) Selena Piek (Netherlands) Cheryl Seinen	21–18, 20–22, 14–21	Bronze

=== European Championships ===
Mixed doubles
Year	Venue	Partner	Opponent	Score	Result
2021	Palace of Sports, Kyiv, Ukraine	(Russia) Rodion Alimov	(England) Marcus Ellis (England) Lauren Smith	11–21, 21–16, 21–15	Gold

=== Summer Universiade ===
Mixed doubles
Year	Venue	Partner	Opponent	Score	Result
2017	Taipei Gymnasium, Taipei, Taiwan	(Russia) Rodion Alimov	(Chinese Taipei) Wang Chi-lin (Chinese Taipei) Lee Chia-hsin	14–21, 13–21	Bronze

=== European Junior Championships ===
Mixed doubles
Year	Venue	Partner	Opponent	Score	Result
2017	Centre Sportif Régional d'Alsace, Mulhouse, France	(Russia) Rodion Alimov	(Scotland) Alexander Dunn (Scotland) Eleanor O'Donnell	21–16, 21–14	Gold

=== BWF World Tour (1 title) ===
The BWF World Tour, which was announced on 19 March 2017 and implemented in 2018, is a series of elite badminton tournaments sanctioned by the Badminton World Federation (BWF). The BWF World Tours are divided into levels of World Tour Finals, Super 1000, Super 750, Super 500, Super 300 (part of the HSBC World Tour), and the BWF Tour Super 100.

Mixed doubles
Year	Tournament	Level	Partner	Opponent	Score	Result
2019	Syed Modi International	Super 300	(Russia) Rodion Alimov	(England) Marcus Ellis (England) Lauren Smith	21–18, 21–16	(gold) Winner

=== BWF Grand Prix (1 runner-up) ===
The BWF Grand Prix had two levels, the Grand Prix and Grand Prix Gold. It was a series of badminton tournaments sanctioned by the Badminton World Federation (BWF) and played between 2007 and 2017.

Women's doubles
Year	Tournament	Partner	Opponent	Score	Result
2017	Scottish Open	(Russia) Ekaterina Bolotova	(Netherlands) Selena Piek (Netherlands) Cheryl Seinen	21–15, 15–21, 11–21	(silver) Runner-up

BWF Grand Prix Gold tournament
BWF Grand Prix tournament

=== BWF International Challenge/Series (14 titles, 4 runners-up) ===
Women's doubles
Year	Tournament	Partner	Opponent	Score	Result
2017	Hungarian International	(Russia) Ekaterina Bolotova	(Russia) Elena Komendrovskaja (Russia) Maria Shegurova	21–13, 21–19	(gold) Winner
2017	Italian International	(Russia) Ekaterina Bolotova	(Denmark) Alexandra Bøje (Denmark) Sara Lundgaard	21–18, 21–11	(gold) Winner
2018	Estonian International	(Russia) Ekaterina Bolotova	(England) Jessica Hopton (England) Jenny Moore	21–10, 21–10	(gold) Winner
2018	Hungarian International	(Russia) Ekaterina Bolotova	(Sweden) Emma Karlsson (Sweden) Johanna Magnusson	21–14, 21–9	(gold) Winner
2018	Italian International	(Russia) Ekaterina Bolotova	(Denmark) Julie Finne-Ipsen (Denmark) Mai Surrow	21–13, 14–21, 21–13	(gold) Winner
2019	Azerbaijan International	(Russia) Ekaterina Bolotova	(England) Chloe Birch (England) Lauren Smith	18–21, 12–21	(silver) Runner-up
2019	Italian International	(Russia) Ekaterina Bolotova	(Bulgaria) Gabriela Stoeva (Bulgaria) Stefani Stoeva	11–21, 14–21	(silver) Runner-up

Mixed doubles
Year	Tournament	Partner	Opponent	Score	Result
2016	Bulgarian International	(Russia) Rodion Alimov	(Russia) Andrei Ivanov (Russia) Ksenia Evgenova	Walkover	(gold) Winner
2016	Turkey International	(Russia) Rodion Alimov	(Turkey) Melih Turgut (Turkey) Fatma Nur Yavuz	19–21, 14–21	(silver) Runner-up
2017	Estonian International	(Russia) Rodion Alimov	(Russia) Anatoliy Yartsev (Russia) Evgeniya Kosetskaya	21–8, 21–19	(gold) Winner
2017	Hungarian International	(Russia) Rodion Alimov	(Denmark) Søren Gravholt (Sweden) Louise Eriksson	25–23, 21–16	(gold) Winner
2018	White Nights	(Russia) Rodion Alimov	(Singapore) Jason Wong (Singapore) Citra Putri Sari Dewi	21–14, 21–19	(gold) Winner
2018	Hungarian International	(Russia) Rodion Alimov	(Denmark) Joel Eipe (Denmark) Mette Poulsen	10–21, 21–19, 10–21	(silver) Runner-up
2018	Italian International	(Russia) Rodion Alimov	(Russia) Evgenij Dremin (Russia) Evgenia Dimova	21–13, 21–16	(gold) Winner
2019	White Nights	(Russia) Rodion Alimov	(Republic of Ireland) Sam Magee (Republic of Ireland) Chloe Magee	21–16, 13–21, 21–16	(gold) Winner
2019	Dubai International	(Russia) Rodion Alimov	(South Korea) Kim Sa-rang (South Korea) Kim Ha-na	22–20, 21–16	(gold) Winner
2026 (I)	India International	(Individual Neutral Athletes) Rodion Alimov	(India) C Lalramsanga (India) Angel Punera	21–12, 21–14	(gold) Winner
2026 (II)	India International	(Individual Neutral Athletes) Rodion Alimov	(India) Sathish Karunakaran (India) Ashwini Ponnappa	19–21, 21–11, 21–13	(gold) Winner

BWF International Challenge tournament
BWF International Series tournament
BWF Future Series tournament
