= 2019 Akita Masters =

2019 badminton tournament in Japan

Tournament details
- Dates: 13–18 August
- Level: Super 100
- Total prize money: US$75,000
- Venue: CNA Arena Akita
- Location: Akita, Akita Prefecture, Japan

Champions
- Men's singles: (Indonesia) Firman Abdul Kholik
- Women's singles: (South Korea) An Se-young
- Men's doubles: (China) Ou Xuanyi (China) Zhang Nan
- Women's doubles: (Japan) Ayako Sakuramoto (Japan) Yukiko Takahata
- Mixed doubles: (South Korea) Ko Sung-hyun (South Korea) Eom Hye-won

The 2019 Akita Masters (officially known as the Yonex Akita Masters 2019 for sponsorship reasons) was a badminton tournament which took place at CNA Arena Akita in Japan from 13 to 18 August 2019 and had a total purse of $75,000.

== Tournament ==
The 2019 Akita Masters was the sixth Super 100 tournament of the 2019 BWF World Tour and also part of the Akita Masters championships, which had been held since 2018. This tournament was organized by the Nippon Badminton Association and sanctioned by the BWF.

=== Venue ===
This international tournament was held at CNA Arena Akita in Akita, Akita Prefecture, Japan.

=== Point distribution ===
Below is the point distribution table for each phase of the tournament based on the BWF points system for the BWF Tour Super 100 event.

Winner	Runner-up	3/4	5/8	9/16	17/32	33/64	65/128	129/256
5,500	4,680	3,850	3,030	2,110	1,290	510	240	100

=== Prize money ===
The total prize money for this tournament was US$75,000. Distribution of prize money was in accordance with BWF regulations.

Event	Winner	Finals	Semi-finals	Quarter-finals	Last 16
Singles	$5,625	$2,850	$1,087.50	$450	$262.50
Doubles	$5,925	$2,850	$1,050	$543.75	$281.25

== Men's singles ==
=== Seeds ===
1. (Thailand) Sitthikom Thammasin (third round)
2. (Thailand) Suppanyu Avihingsanon (third round)
3. (India) Subhankar Dey (withdrew)
4. (Japan) Kazumasa Sakai (third round)
5. (Indonesia) Firman Abdul Kholik (champion)
6. (Thailand) Kunlavut Vitidsarn (withdrew)
7. (Japan) Koki Watanabe (quarter-finals)
8. (Indonesia) Ihsan Maulana Mustofa (second round)

=== Finals ===
Semi-finals
(Japan) Hashiru Shimono	21	17	13
(Japan) Yu Igarashi	19	21	21
(Japan) Yusuke Onodera	15	8
5	(Indonesia) Firman Abdul Kholik	21	21

Final
(Japan) Yu Igarashi	18	20
5	(Indonesia) Firman Abdul Kholik	21	22

=== Top half ===
==== Section 1 ====
First Round
(China) Bai YP	24	21
(Japan) K Matsumura	22	17

Second Round
1	(Thailand) S Thammasin	21	17	21
(Chinese Taipei) Lin C-y	11	21	15
(Thailand) T Saensomboonsuk	20	21	12
(Japan) H Shimono	22	15	21
8	(Indonesia) I M Mustofa	18	17
(China) Bai YP	21	21
(Canada) B. R. Sankeerth	9	15
(Japan) Y Yamaguchi	21	21

Third Round
1	(Thailand) S Thammasin	20	21	4
(Japan) H Shimono	22	18	21
(China) Bai YP	21	22
(Japan) Y Yamaguchi	17	20

Quarter-finals
(Japan) H Shimono	21	19	21
(China) Bai YP	8	21	11

==== Section 2 ====
First Round
(Japan) K Naraoka	21	21
(England) F M Hassan	8	10
(Japan) M Koga	21	19	21
(Indonesia) G P F Cupu	16	21	10

Second Round
4	(Japan) K Sakai	22	21
(Japan) K Naraoka	20	12
(Japan) Y Igarashi	21	21
(South Korea) Choi J-h	11	13
7	(Japan) K Watanabe	21	21
(Japan) M Koga	15	16
(Thailand) P Thongnuam	21	21
(Indonesia) Y F Mainaky	9	11

Third Round
4	(Japan) K Sakai	23	16	16
(Japan) Y Igarashi	21	21	21
7	(Japan) K Watanabe	21	21
(Thailand) P Thongnuam	18	14

Quarter-finals
(Japan) Y Igarashi	23	13	21
7	(Japan) K Watanabe	21	21	19

=== Bottom half ===
==== Section 3 ====
First Round
(Malaysia) Tan J W	19	21	11
(Japan) T Obayashi	21	15	21
(Japan) S Omoto	21	21
(England) H S Wong	7	10

Second Round
(Japan) T Obayashi	21	21
(Chinese Taipei) Yu S-p	14	14
(Canada) J Lam	w	/	o
6	(Thailand) K Vitidsarn
(Japan) Y Onodera	w	/	o
(Malaysia) D M S E Sardik
(Japan) S Omoto	w	/	o
3	(India) S Dey

Third Round
(Japan) T Obayashi	21	21
(Canada) J Lam	4	4
(Japan) Y Onodera	21	21
(Japan) S Omoto	12	13

Quarter-finals
(Japan) T Obayashi	21	15	11
(Japan) Y Onodera	8	21	21

==== Section 4 ====
First Round
(Malaysia) Soo T Z	21	21
(England) K L Chun	13	13

Second Round
(Mauritius) G Paul	21	21
(Malaysia) Lau K L	13	18
(China) Sun FX	21	18	14
5	(Indonesia) F A Kholik	9	21	21
(South Korea) Kim D-h	w	/	o
(Malaysia) Yeoh S Z
(Malaysia) Soo T Z	21	12	19
2	(Thailand) S Avihingsanon	12	21	21

Third Round
(Mauritius) G Paul	13	7
5	(Indonesia) F A Kholik	21	21
(South Korea) Kim D-h	21	21
2	(Thailand) S Avihingsanon	11	19

Quarter-finals
5	(Indonesia) F A Kholik	17	22	22
(South Korea) Kim D-h	21	20	20

== Women's singles ==
=== Seeds ===
1. (Thailand) Nitchaon Jindapol (withdrew)
2. (Japan) Saena Kawakami (withdrew)
3. (South Korea) An Se-young (champion)
4. (Japan) Ayumi Mine (first round)
5. (Indonesia) Ruselli Hartawan (quarter-finals)
6. (China) Zhang Yiman (quarter-finals)
7. (Indonesia) Lyanny Alessandra Mainaky (first round)
8. (South Korea) Sim Yu-jin (first round)

=== Finals ===
Semi-finals
(Thailand) Phittayaporn Chaiwan	21	15	11
3	(South Korea) An Se-young	15	21	21
Q1	(Japan) Natsuki Nidaira	21	12	19
PFQ	(Japan) Haruko Suzuki	14	21	21

Final
3	(South Korea) An Se-young	21	17	21
PFQ	(Japan) Haruko Suzuki	10	21	14

=== Top half ===
==== Section 1 ====
First Round
PFQ	(United States) I Rusli	5	12
(Canada) B Tam	21	21
(China) Ji ST	21	21
PFQ	(Japan) Y Suizu	19	12
7	(Indonesia) L A Mainaky	15	21	9
(Thailand) P Chaiwan	21	18	21
PFQ	(United States) L Lam	15	15
(Japan) S Saito	21	21

Second Round
(Canada) B Tam	16	21	15
(China) Ji ST	21	9	21
(Thailand) P Chaiwan	21	16	21
(Japan) S Saito	15	21	16

Quarter-finals
(China) Ji ST	19	15
(Thailand) P Chaiwan	21	21

==== Section 2 ====
First Round
3	(South Korea) An S-y	w	/	o
Q4
(Thailand) C Jucharoen	22	16
(Japan) N Oie	24	21
5	(Indonesia) R Hartawan	21	21
PFQ	(Japan) Y Nakai	19	18
PFQ	(Japan) M Hayashi	14	21	21
(United States) I Wang	21	17	18

Second Round
3	(South Korea) An S-y	14	21	21
(Japan) N Oie	21	11	5
5	(Indonesia) R Hartawan	21	21
PFQ	(Japan) M Hayashi	13	7

Quarter-finals
3	(South Korea) An S-y	21	21
5	(Indonesia) R Hartawan	17	14

=== Bottom half ===
==== Section 3 ====
First Round
(Japan) M Mitani	19	11
Q1	(Japan) N Nidaira	21	21
(Japan) H Mizui	21	21
8	(South Korea) Sim Y-j	17	11
Q3	(Japan) K Furukawa	21	15	23
(Thailand) S Katethong	12	21	25
PFQ	(Japan) N Shimoda	19	21	21
4	(Japan) A Mine	21	17	9

Second Round
Q1	(Japan) N Nidaira	21	15	24
(Japan) H Mizui	16	21	22
(Thailand) S Katethong	21	16	17
PFQ	(Japan) N Shimoda	16	21	21

Quarter-finals
Q1	(Japan) N Nidaira	21	21
PFQ	(Japan) N Shimoda	13	16

==== Section 4 ====
First Round
(Japan) S Sato	21	21
(Japan) M Urushizaki	12	9
Q2	(Chinese Taipei) Hsu W-c	22	19
6	(China) Zhang YM	24	21
(Japan) A Takahashi	21	22
(Chinese Taipei) Lin H-t	8	20
(United States) I Zhong	12	13
PFQ	(Japan) H Suzuki	21	21

Second Round
(Japan) S Sato	21	23	9
6	(China) Zhang YM	19	25	21
(Japan) A Takahashi	14	22	23
PFQ	(Japan) H Suzuki	21	20	25

Quarter-finals
6	(China) Zhang YM	21	18	14
PFQ	(Japan) H Suzuki	15	21	21

== Men's doubles ==
=== Seeds ===
1. (Japan) Akira Koga / Taichi Saito (final)
2. (Chinese Taipei) Lee Jhe-huei / Yang Po-hsuan (semi-finals)
3. (Japan) Hiroki Okamura / Masayuki Onodera (second round)
4. (Japan) Keiichiro Matsui / Yoshinori Takeuchi (quarter-finals)
5. (Indonesia) Ricky Karanda Suwardi / Angga Pratama (second round)
6. (China) Ou Xuanyi / Zhang Nan (champions)
7. (China) Huang Kaixiang / Liu Cheng (semi-finals)
8. (South Korea) Kang Min-hyuk / Kim Jae-hwan (quarter-finals)

=== Finals ===
Semi-finals
1	(Japan) Akira Koga (Japan) Taichi Saito	21	16	21
7	(China) Huang Kaixiang (China) Liu Cheng	14	21	13
6	(China) Ou Xuanyi (China) Zhang Nan	21	16	21
2	(Chinese Taipei) Lee Jhe-huei (Chinese Taipei) Yang Po-hsuan	17	21	10

Final
1	(Japan) Akira Koga (Japan) Taichi Saito	14	19
6	(China) Ou Xuanyi (China) Zhang Nan	21	21

=== Top half ===
==== Section 1 ====
First Round
1	(Japan) A Koga (Japan) T Saito	21	21
(Canada) J Lam (England) H S Wong	5	7
(Japan) K Mitsuhashi (Japan) Y Ogura	w	/	o
(South Korea) Lee Y-d (South Korea) Yoo Y-s
8	(South Korea) Kang M-h (South Korea) Kim J-h	21	17	21
(South Korea) Na S-s (South Korea) Wang C	15	21	16
(Japan) M Takano (Japan) K Tamate	19	21	21
(Malaysia) Low H Y (Malaysia) Ng E C	21	12	18

Second Round
1	(Japan) A Koga (Japan) T Saito	21	21
(Japan) K Mitsuhashi (Japan) Y Ogura	18	12
8	(South Korea) Kang M-h (South Korea) Kim J-h	21	21
(Japan) M Takano (Japan) K Tamate	15	7

Quarter-finals
1	(Japan) A Koga (Japan) T Saito	21	21
8	(South Korea) Kang M-h (South Korea) Kim J-h	18	9

==== Section 2 ====
First Round
3	(Japan) H Okamura (Japan) M Onodera	21	21
(England) F M Hassan (England) K L Chun	4	3
(Japan) M Kaneko (Japan) Y Kubota	9	0^{r}
(Indonesia) L R Carnando (Indonesia) D Marthin	21	0
7	(China) Huang KX (China) Liu C	21	21
(Japan) K Ichikawa (Japan) D Umayahara	12	13
(Japan) T Nomura (Japan) Y Tsukamoto	22	21
(Thailand) T Isriyanet (Thailand) K Kedren	20	17

Second Round
3	(Japan) H Okamura (Japan) M Onodera	18	13
(Indonesia) L R Carnando (Indonesia) D Marthin	21	21
7	(China) Huang KX (China) Liu C	21	25	21
(Japan) T Nomura (Japan) Y Tsukamoto	19	27	12

Quarter-finals
(Indonesia) L R Carnando (Indonesia) D Marthin	22	13	18
7	(China) Huang KX (China) Liu C	20	21	21

=== Bottom half ===
==== Section 3 ====
First Round
(Malaysia) Chia W J (Malaysia) Man W C	21	21
(Chinese Taipei) Lu C (Chinese Taipei) Tang K-w	16	17
(Japan) A Endo (Japan) Y Takei	13	20
6	(China) Ou XY (China) Zhang N	21	22
(Japan) R Mase (Japan) K Morita	16	21	18
(Malaysia) Shia C K (Malaysia) Tan B H	21	16	21
(Chinese Taipei) Wei C-w (Chinese Taipei) Wu G-x	19	13
4	(Japan) K Matsui (Japan) Y Takeuchi	21	21

Second Round
(Malaysia) Chia W J (Malaysia) Man W C	15	20
6	(China) Ou XY (China) Zhang N	21	22
(Malaysia) Shia C K (Malaysia) Tan B H	20	15
4	(Japan) K Matsui (Japan) Y Takeuchi	22	21

Quarter-finals
6	(China) Ou XY (China) Zhang N	23	21
4	(Japan) K Matsui (Japan) Y Takeuchi	21	18

==== Section 4 ====
First Round
(Japan) A Kobayashi (Japan) K Miyajima	18	21	14
(Japan) S Hoshino (Japan) Y Nishikawa	21	19	21
(Malaysia) Lim K W (Malaysia) Lim Z T	12	13
5	(Indonesia) R Karanda Suwardi (Indonesia) A Pratama	21	21
(South Korea) Kim W-h (South Korea) Park K-h	19	21
(Malaysia) Chang Y J (Malaysia) Tee K W	21	23
(Thailand) I Apisuk (Thailand) T Viriyangkura	21	11	14
2	(Chinese Taipei) Lee J-h (Chinese Taipei) Yang P-h	19	21	21

Second Round
(Japan) S Hoshino (Japan) Y Nishikawa	21	16	21
5	(Indonesia) R Karanda Suwardi (Indonesia) A Pratama	13	21	19
(Malaysia) Chang Y J (Malaysia) Tee K W	6	12
2	(Chinese Taipei) Lee J-h (Chinese Taipei) Yang P-h	21	21

Quarter-finals
(Japan) S Hoshino (Japan) Y Nishikawa	25	15
2	(Chinese Taipei) Lee J-h (Chinese Taipei) Yang P-h	27	21

== Women's doubles ==
=== Seeds ===
1. (Japan) Nami Matsuyama / Chiharu Shida (quarter-finals)
2. (Japan) Ayako Sakuramoto / Yukiko Takahata (champions)
3. (Thailand) Chayanit Chaladchalam / Phataimas Muenwong (withdrew)
4. (Japan) Miki Kashihara / Miyuki Kato (first round)
5. (Indonesia) Ni Ketut Mahadewi Istirani / Tania Oktaviani Kusumah (first round)
6. (Indonesia) Putri Syaikah / Nita Violina Marwah (final)
7. (Japan) Natsuki Sone / Sayaka Hobara (quarter-finals)
8. (Chinese Taipei) Li Zi-qing / Teng Chun-hsun (first round)

=== Finals ===
Semi-finals
6	(Indonesia) Nita Violina Marwah (Indonesia) Putri Syaikah	16	21	21
(Japan) Mayu Nakamura (Japan) Miku Shigeta	21	14	7
(China) Chen Xiaofei (China) Zhang Shuxian	16	14
2	(Japan) Ayako Sakuramoto (Japan) Yukiko Takahata	21	21

Final
6	(Indonesia) Nita Violina Marwah (Indonesia) Putri Syaikah	17	21	15
2	(Japan) Ayako Sakuramoto (Japan) Yukiko Takahata	21	14	21

=== Top half ===
==== Section 1 ====
First Round
(Japan) M Aratama (Japan) S Nagai	21	22	13
(South Korea) Jang E-s (South Korea) Jeong N-e	17	24	21
6	(Indonesia) N V Marwah (Indonesia) P Syaikah	21	21
(Indonesia) D B Anjani (Indonesia) F Iwasaki	7	13
(Malaysia) P Tan K L (Malaysia) M Thinaah	24	15
(Japan) N Fukuman (Japan) E Yokoyama	26	21

Second Round
1	(Japan) N Matsuyama (Japan) C Shida	21	21
(South Korea) Jang E-s (South Korea) Jeong N-e	6	10
6	(Indonesia) N V Marwah (Indonesia) P Syaikah	15	21	21
(Japan) N Fukuman (Japan) E Yokoyama	21	19	17

Quarter-finals
1	(Japan) N Matsuyama (Japan) C Shida	24	21
6	(Indonesia) N V Marwah (Indonesia) P Syaikah	26	23

==== Section 2 ====
First Round
(Japan) S Fukumoto (Japan) N Ono	12	12
(Japan) M Kawazoe (Japan) H Nimura	21	21
8	(Chinese Taipei) Li Z-q (Chinese Taipei) Teng C-h	18	17
(Japan) Y Suizu (Japan) K Yonao	21	21

Second Round
(Japan) M Nakamura (Japan) M Shigeta	21	21
(Japan) M Kawazoe (Japan) H Nimura	14	12
(Japan) Y Suizu (Japan) K Yonao	15	21	21
(China) Kang Y (China) Zhou SQ	21	11	19

Quarter-finals
(Japan) M Nakamura (Japan) M Shigeta	21	21
(Japan) Y Suizu (Japan) K Yonao	17	12

=== Bottom half ===
==== Section 3 ====
First Round
(Japan) S Ozaki (Japan) A Watanabe	12	18
7	(Japan) S Hobara (Japan) N Sone	21	21
(China) Chen XF (China) Zhang SX	21	21
4	(Japan) M Kashihara (Japan) M Kato	17	12

Second Round
(Japan) E Honda (Japan) N Shimizu	21	10	15
7	(Japan) S Hobara (Japan) N Sone	14	21	21
(Malaysia) Teoh M X (Malaysia) Yap L	10	20
(China) Chen XF (China) Zhang SX	21	22

Quarter-finals
7	(Japan) S Hobara (Japan) N Sone	17	16
(China) Chen XF (China) Zhang SX	21	21

==== Section 4 ====
First Round
(Japan) C Hoshi (Japan) A Matsuda	21	18	18
(Japan) M Kawashima (Japan) N Saito	18	21	21
(Japan) R Iwanaga (Japan) K Nakanishi	21	22
5	(Indonesia) N K M Istirani (Indonesia) T O Kusumah	14	20
(Japan) Y Komatsu (Japan) N Uratani	21	19	14
(Japan) Y Imai (Japan) C Yamafuji	11	21	21
(Thailand) R Laisuan (Thailand) S Mingchua	10	18
2	(Japan) A Sakuramoto (Japan) Y Takahata	21	21

Second Round
(Japan) M Kawashima (Japan) N Saito	12	15
(Japan) R Iwanaga (Japan) K Nakanishi	21	21
(Japan) Y Imai (Japan) C Yamafuji	10	12
2	(Japan) A Sakuramoto (Japan) Y Takahata	21	21

Quarter-finals
(Japan) R Iwanaga (Japan) K Nakanishi	10	17
2	(Japan) A Sakuramoto (Japan) Y Takahata	21	21

== Mixed doubles ==
=== Seeds ===
1. (Malaysia) Chen Tang Jie / Peck Yen Wei (semi-finals)
2. (Malaysia) Hoo Pang Ron / Cheah Yee See (second round)
3. (South Korea) Ko Sung-hyun / Eom Hye-won (champions)
4. (United States) Mathew Fogarty / Isabel Zhong (second round)
5. (South Korea) Kim Won-ho / Kim Hye-rin (withdrew)
6. (South Korea) Park Kyung-hoon / Baek Ha-na (withdrew)
7. (China) Guo Xinwa / Zhang Shuxian (quarter-finals)
8. (Thailand) Parinyawat Thongnuam / Kittipak Dubthuk (withdrew)

=== Finals ===
Semi-finals
1	(Malaysia) Chen Tang Jie (Malaysia) Peck Yen Wei	19	19
3	(South Korea) Ko Sung-hyun (South Korea) Eom Hye-won	21	21
PFQ	(South Korea) Wang Chan (South Korea) Jeong Na-eun	18	14
(Japan) Kyohei Yamashita (Japan) Naru Shinoya	21	21

Final
3	(South Korea) Ko Sung-hyun (South Korea) Eom Hye-won	21	21
(Japan) Kyohei Yamashita (Japan) Naru Shinoya	10	17

=== Top half ===
==== Section 1 ====
First Round
1	(Malaysia) Chen T J (Malaysia) Peck Y W	21	21
(Chinese Taipei) Wei C-w (Chinese Taipei) Li Z-q	13	4
(Indonesia) Y F Mainaky (Indonesia) L A Mainaky	w	/	o
Q3
PFQ	(Japan) D Suzuki (Japan) Y Imai	21	15
(Japan) H Okamura (Japan) C Hoshi	23	21
(China) Chen K (China) Zhou SQ	w	/	o
Q2

Second Round
1	(Malaysia) Chen T J (Malaysia) Peck Y W	21	21
(Indonesia) Y F Mainaky (Indonesia) L A Mainaky	10	8
(Japan) H Okamura (Japan) C Hoshi	21	21
(China) Chen K (China) Zhou SQ	13	14

Quarter-finals
1	(Malaysia) Chen T J (Malaysia) Peck Y W	21	21
(Japan) H Okamura (Japan) C Hoshi	16	15

==== Section 2 ====
First Round
3	(South Korea) Ko S-h (South Korea) Eom H-w	w	/	o
Q4
(Chinese Taipei) Wu G-x (Chinese Taipei) Teng C-h	12	18
(China) Ou XY (China) Chen XF	21	21
7	(China) Guo XW (China) Zhang SX	21	21
(Japan) T Urai (Japan) R Miyaura	17	15
(Malaysia) Tee K W (Malaysia) M Thinaah	18	14
(Malaysia) Man W C (Malaysia) P Tan K L	21	21

Second Round
3	(South Korea) Ko S-h (South Korea) Eom H-w	21	21
(China) Ou XY (China) Chen XF	13	15
7	(China) Guo XW (China) Zhang SX	21	21
(Malaysia) Man W C (Malaysia) P Tan K L	12	17

Quarter-finals
3	(South Korea) Ko S-h (South Korea) Eom H-w	21	22
7	(China) Guo XW (China) Zhang SX	18	20

=== Bottom half ===
==== Section 3 ====
First Round
(Malaysia) Ng E C (Malaysia) Yap L	23	12
(South Korea) Na S-s (South Korea) Jang E-s	25	21
(Japan) Y Kubota (Japan) N Matsuyama	23	15	13
PFQ	(South Korea) Wang C (South Korea) Jeong N-e	21	21	21
PFQ	(Indonesia) G A Prihardika (Indonesia) I C S Jamil	21	21
(Chinese Taipei) Lin C-y (Chinese Taipei) Lin H-t	10	14
Q1
4	(United States) M Fogarty (United States) I Zhong	w	/	o

Second Round
(South Korea) Na S-s (South Korea) Jang E-s	19	24	13
PFQ	(South Korea) Wang C (South Korea) Jeong N-e	21	22	21
PFQ	(Indonesia) G A Prihardika (Indonesia) I C S Jamil	21	21
4	(United States) M Fogarty (United States) I Zhong	2	11

Quarter-finals
PFQ	(South Korea) Wang C (South Korea) Jeong N-e	21	21
PFQ	(Indonesia) G A Prihardika (Indonesia) I C S Jamil	17	16

==== Section 4 ====
First Round
(Japan) K Yamashita (Japan) N Shinoya	w	/	o
(United States) V Chiu (United States) B Chi
(Chinese Taipei) Yu S-p (Chinese Taipei) Hsu W-c	14	17
PFQ	(Japan) S Nihei (Japan) N Uesugi	21	21
(Japan) Y Nishikawa (Japan) S Ozaki	21	19	21
(Thailand) V Kanjanakeereewong (Thailand) R Laisuan	11	21	11
(Malaysia) Low H Y (Malaysia) Teoh M X	24	20
2	(Malaysia) Hoo P R (Malaysia) Cheah Y S	26	22

Second Round
(Japan) K Yamashita (Japan) N Shinoya	21	21
PFQ	(Japan) S Nihei (Japan) N Uesugi	15	11
(Japan) Y Nishikawa (Japan) S Ozaki	24	18	22
2	(Malaysia) Hoo P R (Malaysia) Cheah Y S	22	21	20

Quarter-finals
(Japan) K Yamashita (Japan) N Shinoya	21	21
(Japan) Y Nishikawa (Japan) S Ozaki	13	15

Preceded by 2018 Akita Masters	Akita Masters	Succeeded by 2020 Akita Masters
Preceded by 2019 Hyderabad Open	BWF World Tour; 2019 BWF season	Succeeded by 2019 Chinese Taipei Open
