= 2019 BWF International Challenge =

The 2019 BWF International Challenge was the thirteenth season of the BWF International Challenge.

== Schedule ==
Below is the schedule released by Badminton World Federation:

Tour	Official title	Venue	City	Date		Prize money USD	TS link
Tour	Official title	Venue	City	Start	Finish	Prize money USD	TS link
1	The 28th Iran Fajr International Challenge 2019	Enghelab Sport Complex	Tehran	4 February	7 February	25,000	
2	(Austria) Austrian Open 2019	Wiener Stadthalle	Vienna	20 February	23 February	25,000	
3	(Poland) YONEX Polish Open 2019	Hala Polonia	Częstochowa	28 March	31 March	25,000	
4	(Japan) YONEX Osaka International Challenge 2019	Moriguchi City Gymnasium	Moriguchi	3 April	7 April	25,000	
5	(Finland) Finnish Open 2019	Energia Areena	Vantaa	4 April	7 April	25,000	
6	Ciputra Hanoi - Yonex Sunrise Vietnam International Challenge 2019	Tay Ho District Stadium	Hanoi	9 April	14 April	25,000	
7	34th Brazil International Challenge 2019	Fonte São Paulo Venue	Campinas	1 May	5 May	25,000	
8	LI-NING Denmark Challenge 2019	Farum Arena	Farum	9 May	12 May	25,000	
9	Azerbaijan International 2019	Baku Sports Palace	Baku	6 June	9 June	25,000	
10	(Spain) Spanish International 2019	Polideportivo Municipal 'Marqués de Samarach'	Madrid	12 June	15 June	25,000	
11	Mongolia International Challenge 2019	National Sports Center	Ulaanbaatar	25 June	30 June	25,000	
12	(Russia) White Nights 2019	Arena	Gatchina	10 July	14 July	25,000	
13	(Nigeria) Lagos International Badminton Classics 2019	Okoya Thomas Hall, Teslim Balogun Stadium	Lagos	24 July	27 July	25,000	
14	(Ukraine) RSL Kharkiv International 2019	Lokomotiv	Kharkiv	4 September	8 September	25,000	
15	(Belgium) YONEX Belgian International 2019	Sportoase	Leuven	11 September	14 September	25,000	
16	South Australia International 2019	Titanium Arena	Adelaide	11 September	15 September	25,000	
17	Maldives International Challenge 2019	Malé Sports Complex	Malé	24 September	29 September	25,000	
18	(United Arab Emirates) Dubai International Challenge 2019	NAS Sports Complex	Dubai	16 October	20 October	25,000	
19	CAFFINO Indonesia International Challenge 2019	GOR Djarum Magelang	Magelang	22 October	27 October	25,000	
20	(Hungary) 44th YONEX Hungarian International Championships 2019	Budaörs Városi Sportshall	Budaörs	30 October	2 November	25,000	
21	(Republic of Ireland) FZ FORZA Irish Open 2019	National Indoor Arena	Dublin	13 November	16 November	25,000	
22	CELCOM AXIATA Malaysia International Challenge 2019	DEWAN 2020	Kangar, Perlis	12 November	17 November	25,000	
23	YONEX - SUNRISE Nepal International Challenge 2019	National Sports Council	Kathmandu	13 November	17 November	25,000	
24	(Scotland) Scottish Open 2019	Emirates Arena	Glasgow	21 November	24 November	25,000	
25	INFOSYS FOUNDATION - India International Challenge 2019	Cricket Club of India	Mumbai	20 November	24 November	25,000	
26	YONEX SUNRISE Bangladesh International Challenge 2019	Shaheed Tajuddin Ahmed Indoor Stadium	Dhaka	10 December	15 December	25,000	
27	(Italy) Italian International 2019	PalaBadminton	Milan	12 December	15 December	25,000	
28	(United States) 2019 YONEX/K&D GRAPHICS International Challenge	Orange County Badminton Club	Orange County	17 December	21 December	25,000	

== Results ==
=== Winners ===
Tour	Men's singles	Women's singles	Men's doubles	Women's doubles	Mixed doubles
Iran Fajr	(Thailand) Kunlavut Vitidsarn	(Thailand) Supanida Katethong	(Indonesia) Adnan Maulana (Indonesia) Ghifari Anandaffa Prihardika	(Indonesia) Nita Violina Marwah (Indonesia) Putri Syaikah	—N/a
Austria	(Netherlands) Mark Caljouw	(China) Wang Zhiyi	(China) Guo Xinwa (China) Liu Shiwen	(China) Liu Xuanxuan (China) Xia Yuting	(Netherlands) Robin Tabeling (Netherlands) Selena Piek
Poland	(Thailand) Kunlavut Vitidsarn	(China) Wei Yaxin	(Chinese Taipei) Lee Jhe-huei (Chinese Taipei) Yang Po-hsuan	(Japan) Chisato Hoshi (Japan) Aoi Matsuda	(England) Ben Lane (England) Jessica Pugh
(Japan) Osaka	(Japan) Koki Watanabe	(Japan) Saena Kawakami	(South Korea) Ko Sung-hyun (South Korea) Shin Baek-cheol	(Japan) Sayaka Hobara (Japan) Natsuki Sone	(South Korea) Kim Won-ho (South Korea) Jeong Na-eun
Finland	(Thailand) Kunlavut Vitidsarn	(Denmark) Julie Dawall Jakobsen	(Indonesia) Muhammad Shohibul Fikri (Indonesia) Bagas Maulana	(Japan) Erina Honda (Japan) Nozomi Shimizu	(Indonesia) Rehan Naufal Kusharjanto (Indonesia) Lisa Ayu Kusumawati
Vietnam	(Indonesia) Firman Abdul Kholik	(Japan) Hirari Mizui	(Indonesia) Kenas Adi Haryanto (Indonesia) Rian Agung Saputro	(Indonesia) Nita Violina Marwah (Indonesia) Putri Syaikah	(Japan) Hiroki Midorikawa (Japan) Natsu Saito
Brazil	(Israel) Misha Zilberman	(Belgium) Lianne Tan	(India) Satwiksairaj Rankireddy (India) Chirag Shetty	(Canada) Rachel Honderich (Canada) Kristen Tsai	(Netherlands) Robin Tabeling (Netherlands) Selena Piek
Denmark	(Denmark) Hans-Kristian Vittinghus	(Denmark) Mia Blichfeldt	(Japan) Shohei Hoshino (Japan) Yujiro Nishikawa	(Japan) Saori Ozaki (Japan) Akane Watanabe	(France) Ronan Labar (France) Anne Tran
Azerbaijan	(Denmark) Rasmus Gemke	(Thailand) Phittayaporn Chaiwan	(Germany) Mark Lamsfuß (Germany) Marvin Emil Seidel	(England) Chloe Birch (England) Lauren Smith	(France) Thom Gicquel (France) Delphine Delrue
Spain	(Thailand) Kunlavut Vitidsarn	(Thailand) Phittayaporn Chaiwan	(Denmark) Mathias Boe (Denmark) Mads Conrad-Petersen	(Bulgaria) Gabriela Stoeva (Bulgaria) Stefani Stoeva	(England) Ben Lane (England) Jessica Pugh
Mongolia	(Japan) Kodai Naraoka	(Thailand) Supanida Katethong	(South Korea) Kim Won-ho (South Korea) Park Kyung-hoon	(Singapore) Shinta Mulia Sari (Singapore) Crystal Wong	(Hong Kong) Mak Hee Chun (Hong Kong) Chau Hoi Wah
(Russia) White Nights	(Malaysia) Iskandar Zulkarnain Zainuddin	(Russia) Evgeniya Kosetskaya	(Russia) Nikita Khakimov (Russia) Alexandr Zinchenko	(Japan) Yukino Nakai (Japan) Nao Ono	(Russia) Rodion Alimov (Russia) Alina Davletova
(Nigeria) Lagos	(Vietnam) Nguyễn Tiến Minh	(Turkey) Neslihan Yiğit	(Germany) Jones Ralfy Jansen (Germany) Peter Käsbauer	(India) Pooja Dandu (India) Sanjana Santosh	(India) Arjun M.R. (India) K. Maneesha
(Ukraine) Kharkiv	(Netherlands) Mark Caljouw	(France) Qi Xuefei	(England) Ben Lane (England) Sean Vendy	(England) Chloe Birch (England) Lauren Smith	(Poland) Paweł Śmiłowski (Poland) Magdalena Świerczyńska
Belgium	(India) Lakshya Sen	(Denmark) Line Christophersen	(England) Ben Lane (England) Sean Vendy	(Bulgaria) Gabriela Stoeva (Bulgaria) Stefani Stoeva	(England) Ben Lane (England) Jessica Pugh
South Australia	(Malaysia) Ng Tze Yong	(Japan) Natsuki Nidaira	(South Korea) Kim Duk-young (South Korea) Kim Sa-rang	(Japan) Rin Iwanaga (Japan) Kie Nakanishi	(Canada) Joshua Hurlburt-Yu (Canada) Josephine Wu
Maldives	(India) Kaushal Dharmamer	(United States) Iris Wang	(Japan) Keiichiro Matsui (Japan) Yoshinori Takeuchi	(Japan) Sayaka Hobara (Japan) Natsuki Sone	(Thailand) Chaloempon Charoenkitamorn (Thailand) Chasinee Korepap
(United Arab Emirates) Dubai	(Japan) Kodai Naraoka	(Japan) Mako Urushizaki	(Japan) Keiichiro Matsui (Japan) Yoshinori Takeuchi	(Japan) Rin Iwanaga (Japan) Kie Nakanishi	(Russia) Rodion Alimov (Russia) Alina Davletova
Indonesia	(Indonesia) Ikhsan Rumbay	(Japan) Asuka Takahashi	(South Korea) Kang Min-hyuk (South Korea) Kim Jae-hwan	(Indonesia) Anggia Shitta Awanda (Indonesia) Pia Zebadiah Bernadet	(Indonesia) Zachariah Josiahno Sumanti (Indonesia) Hediana Julimarbela
Hungary	(Spain) Pablo Abián	(Turkey) Neslihan Yiğit	(South Korea) Kim Duk-young (South Korea) Kim Sa-rang	(Canada) Rachel Honderich (Canada) Kristen Tsai	(South Korea) Kim Sa-rang (South Korea) Kim Ha-na
(Republic of Ireland) Ireland	(France) Toma Junior Popov	(France) Qi Xuefei	(Germany) Jones Ralfy Jansen (Germany) Peter Käsbauer	(Denmark) Amalie Magelund (Denmark) Freja Ravn	(Denmark) Mathias Christiansen (Denmark) Alexandra Bøje
Malaysia	(Malaysia) Cheam June Wei	(China) Wang Zhiyi	(Japan) Hiroki Midorikawa (Japan) Kyohei Yamashita	(Japan) Natsu Saito (Japan) Naru Shinoya	(China) Dong Weijie (China) Chen Xiaofei
Nepal	(Vietnam) Phạm Cao Cường	(Thailand) Porntip Buranaprasertsuk	(India) Manu Attri (India) B. Sumeeth Reddy	(Australia) Setyana Mapasa (Australia) Gronya Somerville	(Thailand) Supak Jomkoh (Thailand) Supissara Paewsampran
India	(Canada) Xiaodong Sheng	(Thailand) Porntip Buranaprasertsuk	(India) Manu Attri (India) B. Sumeeth Reddy	(Malaysia) Pearly Tan Koong Le (Malaysia) Thinaah Muralitharan	(Malaysia) Hoo Pang Ron (Malaysia) Cheah Yee See
(Scotland) Scottish	(India) Lakshya Sen	(France) Qi Xuefei	(Scotland) Alexander Dunn (Scotland) Adam Hall	(Denmark) Amalie Magelund (Denmark) Freja Ravn	(Denmark) Mathias Christiansen (Denmark) Alexandra Bøje
Bangladesh	(India) Lakshya Sen	(Vietnam) Nguyễn Thùy Linh	(Malaysia) Chang Yee Jun (Malaysia) Tee Kai Wun	(Malaysia) Pearly Tan Koong Le (Malaysia) Thinaah Muralitharan	(Malaysia) Hoo Pang Ron (Malaysia) Cheah Yee See
Italy	(France) Christo Popov	(Spain) Carolina Marín	(Germany) Bjarne Geiss (Germany) Jan Colin Völker	(Bulgaria) Gabriela Stoeva (Bulgaria) Stefani Stoeva	(Russia) Vladimir Ivanov (Russia) Ekaterina Bolotova
United States	(Japan) Kodai Naraoka	(Vietnam) Vũ Thị Trang	(Chinese Taipei) Chen Xin-yuan (Chinese Taipei) Lin Yu-chieh	(Australia) Setyana Mapasa (Australia) Gronya Somerville	(Canada) Joshua Hurlburt-Yu (Canada) Josephine Wu

=== Performance by nation ===
Rank	Nation	(Iran)	(Austria)	(Poland)	(Japan)	(Finland)	(Vietnam)	(Brazil)	(Denmark)	(Azerbaijan)	(Spain)	(Mongolia)	(Russia)	(Nigeria)	(Ukraine)	(Australia)	(Belgium)	(Maldives)	(United Arab Emirates)	(Indonesia)	(Hungary)	(Republic of Ireland)	(Malaysia)	(Nepal)	(India)	(Scotland)	(Bangladesh)	(Italy)	(United States)	Total
1	Japan			1	3	1	2		2			1	1			2		2	4	1			2						1	23
2	Thailand	2		1		1				1	2	1						1						2	1					12
3	Denmark					1			2	1	1						1					2				2				10
3	Indonesia	2				2	3													3										10
5	India							1						2			1	1						1	1	1	1			9
6	Malaysia												1			1							1		2		3			8
7	England			1						1	1				2		2													7
7	France								1	1					1							2				1		1		7
7	South Korea				2							1				1				1	2									7
10	China		3	1																			2							6
11	Canada							1								1					1				1				1	5
11	Russia												3						1									1		5
13	Germany									1				1								1						1		4
13	Netherlands		2					1							1															4
13	Vietnam													1										1			1		1	4
16	Bulgaria										1						1											1		3
17	Australia																							1					1	2
17	Chinese Taipei			1																									1	2
17	Spain																				1							1		2
17	Turkey													1							1									2
21	Belgium							1																						1
21	Hong Kong											1																		1
21	Israel							1																						1
21	Poland														1															1
21	Scotland																									1				1
21	Singapore											1																		1
21	United States																	1												1

=== Players with multiple titles ===
In alphabetical order.

Rank	Player	MS	WS	MD	WD	XD	Total
1	(England) Ben Lane			2		3	5
2	(Thailand) Kunlavut Vitidsarn	4					4
3	(Bulgaria) Gabriela Stoeva				3		3
3	(Bulgaria) Stefani Stoeva				3		3
3	(England) Jessica Pugh					3	3
3	(France) Qi Xuefei		3				3
3	(India) Lakshya Sen	3					3
3	(Japan) Kodai Naraoka	3					3
3	(South Korea) Kim Sa-rang			2		1	3
10	(Australia) Setyana Mapasa				2		2
10	(Australia) Gronya Somerville				2		2
10	(Canada) Rachel Honderich				2		2
10	(Canada) Joshua Hurlburt-Yu					2	2
10	(Canada) Kristen Tsai				2		2
10	(Canada) Josephine Wu					2	2
10	(China) Wang Zhiyi		2				2
10	(Denmark) Alexandra Bøje					2	2
10	(Denmark) Mathias Christiansen					2	2
10	(Denmark) Amalie Magelund				2		2
10	(Denmark) Freja Ravn				2		2
10	(England) Chloe Birch				2		2
10	(England) Lauren Smith				2		2
10	(England) Sean Vendy			2			2
10	(Germany) Jones Ralfy Jansen			2			2
10	(Germany) Peter Käsbauer			2			2
10	(India) Manu Attri			2			2
10	(India) B. Sumeeth Reddy			2			2
10	(Indonesia) Nita Violina Marwah				2		2
10	(Indonesia) Putri Syaikah				2		2
10	(Japan) Sayaka Hobara				2		2
10	(Japan) Rin Iwanaga				2		2
10	(Japan) Keiichiro Matsui			2			2
10	(Japan) Hiroki Midorikawa			1		1	2
10	(Japan) Kie Nakanishi				2		2
10	(Japan) Natsu Saito				1	1	2
10	(Japan) Natsuki Sone				2		2
10	(Japan) Yoshinori Takeuchi			2			2
10	(Malaysia) Cheah Yee See					2	2
10	(Malaysia) Hoo Pang Ron					2	2
10	(Malaysia) Thinaah Muralitharan				2		2
10	(Malaysia) Pearly Tan Koong Le				2		2
10	(Netherlands) Mark Caljouw	2					2
10	(Netherlands) Selena Piek					2	2
10	(Netherlands) Robin Tabeling					2	2
10	(Russia) Rodion Alimov					2	2
10	(Russia) Alina Davletova					2	2
10	(South Korea) Kim Duk-young			2			2
10	(South Korea) Kim Won-ho			1		1	2
10	(Thailand) Porntip Buranaprasertsuk		2				2
10	(Thailand) Phittayaporn Chaiwan		2				2
10	(Thailand) Supanida Katethong		2				2
10	(Turkey) Neslihan Yiğit		2				2
