= 2019 Hyderabad Open (badminton) =

2019 badminton tournament in India

Tournament details
- Dates: 6–11 August
- Level: Super 100
- Total prize money: US$75,000
- Venue: G. M. C. Balayogi SATS Indoor Stadium
- Location: Hyderabad, India

Champions
- Men's singles: (India) Sourabh Verma
- Women's singles: (Singapore) Yeo Jia Min
- Men's doubles: (Indonesia) Muhammad Shohibul Fikri (Indonesia) Bagas Maulana
- Women's doubles: (South Korea) Baek Ha-na (South Korea) Jung Kyung-eun
- Mixed doubles: (Malaysia) Hoo Pang Ron (Malaysia) Cheah Yee See

The 2019 Hyderabad Open (officially known as the IDBI Federal Life Insurance Hyderabad Open 2019 for sponsorship reasons) was a badminton tournament which took place at G. M. C. Balayogi SATS Indoor Stadium in Hyderabad, India, from 6 to 11 August 2019 and had a total purse of $75,000.

== Tournament ==
The 2019 Hyderabad Open was the fifth Super 100 tournament of the 2019 BWF World Tour and also part of the Hyderabad Open championships, which had been held since 2018. This tournament was organized by the Badminton Association of India and sanctioned by the BWF.

=== Venue ===
This international tournament was held at G. M. C. Balayogi SATS Indoor Stadium in Hyderabad, Telangana, India.

=== Point distribution ===
Below is the point distribution table for each phase of the tournament based on the BWF points system for the BWF Tour Super 100 event.

| Winner | Runner-up | 3/4 | 5/8 | 9/16 | 17/32 | 33/64 | 65/128 | 129/256 |
|---|---|---|---|---|---|---|---|---|
| 5,500 | 4,680 | 3,850 | 3,030 | 2,110 | 1,290 | 510 | 240 | 100 |

=== Prize money ===
The total prize money for this tournament was US$75,000. Distribution of prize money was in accordance with BWF regulations.

| Event | Winner | Finals | Semi-finals | Quarter-finals | Last 16 |
| Singles | $5,625 | $2,850 | $1,087.50 | $450 | $262.50 |
| Doubles | $5,925 | $2,850 | $1,050 | $543.75 | $281.25 |

== Men's singles ==
=== Seeds ===
1. (India) Sameer Verma (second round)
2. (India) B. Sai Praneeth (second round)
3. (India) Prannoy Kumar (second round)
4. (India) Parupalli Kashyap (third round)
5. (India) Subhankar Dey (quarter-finals)
6. (Indonesia) Shesar Hiren Rhustavito (third round)
7. (India) Sourabh Verma (champion)
8. (Indonesia) Firman Abdul Kholik (third round)

=== Finals ===
Semi-finals
(South Korea) Heo Kwang-hee | 21 | 10 | 23
(Singapore) Loh Kean Yew | 16 | 21 | 25
7 | (India) Sourabh Verma | 23 | 21
(Malaysia) Iskandar Zulkarnain | 21 | 16

Final
(Singapore) Loh Kean Yew | 13 | 21 | 16
7 | (India) Sourabh Verma | 21 | 14 | 21

=== Top half ===
==== Section 1 ====
First Round
(India) S Thakur | 15 | 10
(South Korea) Heo K-h | 21 | 21
(India) M Manjunath | 22 | 21
Q3 | (Malaysia) Chong Y H | 20 | 17
PFQ | (India) K Gulshan Kumar | 21 | 21
(India) H Dani | 18 | 12
PFQ | (India) C Sen | 19 | 25 | 10
PFQ | (Indonesia) A Marteen | 21 | 23 | 21

Second Round
1 | (India) Sa Verma | 18 | 11
(South Korea) Heo K-h | 21 | 21
Q1 | (India) Rahul Bharadwaj B.M | 15 | 14
(India) M Manjunath | 21 | 21
6 | (Indonesia) S H Rhustavito | 21 | 21
PFQ | (India) K Gulshan Kumar | 16 | 15
(Finland) K Koljonen | 18 | 21 | 21
PFQ | (Indonesia) A Marteen | 21 | 17 | 15

Third Round
(South Korea) Heo K-h | 10 | 21 | 21
(India) M Manjunath | 21 | 15 | 13
6 | (Indonesia) S H Rhustavito | 21 | 15
(Finland) K Koljonen | 23 | 21

Quarter-finals
(South Korea) Heo K-h | 21 | 21
(Finland) K Koljonen | 10 | 18

==== Section 2 ====
First Round
Q8 | (South Korea) Kim D-h | 14 | 21 | 21
(India) Si Verma | 21 | 14 | 19
(United States) T Lam | 7 | 13
(Singapore) Loh K Y | 21 | 21
Q4 | (Malaysia) Yeoh S Z | 15 | 21 | 21
(Austria) L Wraber | 21 | 9 | 13
(India) L Sen | 17 | 15
(Malaysia) Cheam J W | 21 | 21

Second Round
4 | (India) P Kashyap | 23 | 19 | 21
Q8 | (South Korea) Kim D-h | 21 | 21 | 17
(Indonesia) S D Kuncoro | 2^{r}
(Singapore) Loh K Y | 1
5 | (India) S Dey | 19 | 21 | 21
Q4 | (Malaysia) Yeoh S Z | 21 | 13 | 16
(Indonesia) C A D Wardoyo | 26 | 21
(Malaysia) Cheam J W | 24 | 17

Third Round
4 | (India) P Kashyap | 21 | 15 | 19
(Singapore) Loh K Y | 17 | 21 | 21
5 | (India) S Dey | 21 | 21
(Indonesia) C A D Wardoyo | 16 | 15

Quarter-finals
(Singapore) Loh K Y | 21 | 21
5 | (India) S Dey | 11 | 16

=== Bottom half ===
==== Section 3 ====
First Round
(China) Sun FX | 21 | 24
(Canada) Sheng XD | 17 | 22
(Thailand) P Thongnuam | 19 | 16
(Thailand) A Namkul | 21 | 21
(Malaysia) Soo T Z | 21 | 21
(India) S P Singh | 16 | 17
PFQ | (Malaysia) Tan J W | 0
(India) Gurusaidutt | 3^{r}

Second Round
(China) Sun FX | 21 | 21
(Malaysia) Goh G C | 18 | 16
(Thailand) A Namkul | 17 | 14
7 | (India) So Verma | 21 | 21
(Malaysia) Soo T Z | 21 | 3 | 14
(India) A Jayaram | 18 | 21 | 21
PFQ | (Malaysia) Tan J W | 21 | 21
3 | (India) Prannoy K | 17 | 10

Third Round
(China) Sun FX | 16 | 11
7 | (India) So Verma | 21 | 21
(India) A Jayaram | 21 | 21
PFQ | (Malaysia) Tan J W | 18 | 13

Quarter-finals
7 | (India) So Verma | 21 | 21
(India) A Jayaram | 18 | 9

==== Section 4 ====
First Round
Q6 | (India) B Kajla | 17 | 21 | 15
Q7 | (China) Bai YP | 21 | 19 | 21
(Canada) B. R. Sankeerth | 17 | 20
(Indonesia) I M Mustofa | 21 | 22
Q2 | (India) A Tandon | 21 | 21
(India) K A Walter | 12 | 14
(Indonesia) I Rumbay | 21 | 21 | 21
(India) K Dharmamer | 15 | 23 | 7

Second Round
Q7 | (China) Bai YP | 16 | 23 | 21
Q5 | (India) R Y Chittaboina | 21 | 21 | 15
(Indonesia) I M Mustofa | 12 | 15
8 | (Indonesia) F A Kholik | 21 | 21
Q2 | (India) A Tandon | 21 | 13 | 11
(Malaysia) I Zulkarnain | 16 | 21 | 21
(Indonesia) I Rumbay | 21 | 21 | 21
2 | (India) B. Sai Praneeth | 17 | 23 | 15

Third Round
Q7 | (China) Bai YP | 21 | 13 | 21
8 | (Indonesia) F A Kholik | 16 | 21 | 16
(Malaysia) I Zulkarnain | 21 | 21
(Indonesia) I Rumbay | 16 | 15

Quarter-finals
Q7 | (China) Bai YP | 16 | 21 | 13
(Malaysia) I Zulkarnain | 21 | 12 | 21

== Women's singles ==
=== Seeds ===
1. (Singapore) Yeo Jia Min (champion)
2. (South Korea) An Se-young (final)
3. (China) Zhang Yiman (quarter-finals)
4. (Thailand) Porntip Buranaprasertsuk (semi-finals)
5. (Israel) Ksenia Polikarpova (withdrew)
6. (Chinese Taipei) Pai Yu-po (quarter-finals)
7. (Canada) Brittney Tam (second round)
8. (Indonesia) Choirunnisa (first round)

=== Finals ===
Semi-finals
1 | (Singapore) Yeo Jia Min | 21 | 15 | 21
(Thailand) Phittayaporn Chaiwan | 11 | 21 | 18
4 | (Thailand) Porntip Buranaprasertsuk | 14 | 13
2 | (South Korea) An Se-young | 21 | 21

Final
1 | (Singapore) Yeo Jia Min | 12 | 21 | 21
2 | (South Korea) An Se-young | 21 | 17 | 19

=== Top half ===
==== Section 1 ====
First Round
1 | (Singapore) Yeo J M | 21 | 21
(Thailand) S Katethong | 12 | 19
Q1 | (India) S Gautam | 11 | 13
(China) Ji ST | 21 | 21
6 | (Chinese Taipei) Pai Y-p | 21 | 21
(United States) J Gai | 19 | 14
(Chinese Taipei) Chiang Y-l | 17 | 21 | 20
(South Korea) Sim Y-j | 21 | 16 | 22

Second Round
1 | (Singapore) Yeo J M | 21 | 19 | 21
(China) Ji ST | 17 | 21 | 15
6 | (Chinese Taipei) Pai Y-p | 21 | 7 | 21
(South Korea) Sim Y-j | 12 | 21 | 15

Quarter-finals
1 | (Singapore) Yeo J M | 21 | 18 | 21
6 | (Chinese Taipei) Pai Y-p | 16 | 21 | 19

==== Section 2 ====
First Round
3 | (China) Zhang YM | 21 | 21
(India) R Mookerjee | 15 | 13
(Indonesia) Y Y Susanto | 21 | 21
(India) M Agrey | 13 | 15
7 | (Canada) B Tam | 21 | 16 | 21
(Thailand) C Jucharoen | 17 | 21 | 18
(India) V Gummadi | 16 | 10
(Thailand) P Chaiwan | 21 | 21

Second Round
3 | (China) Zhang YM | 21 | 21
(Indonesia) Y Y Susanto | 15 | 13
7 | (Canada) B Tam | 8 | 11
(Thailand) P Chaiwan | 21 | 21

Quarter-finals
3 | (China) Zhang YM | 21 | 16 | 20
(Thailand) P Chaiwan | 19 | 21 | 22

=== Bottom half ===
==== Section 3 ====
First Round
(India) A Prabhudesai | 18 | 19
(Russia) N Perminova | 21 | 21
(Malaysia) Lee Y Y | 21 | 19 | 21
PFQ | (India) A Chaliha | 13 | 21 | 17
(France) Qi XF | 21 | 21
(India) S K P Kudaravalli | 15 | 10
(India) R Das | 13 | 13
4 | (Thailand) P Buranaprasertsuk | 21 | 21

Second Round
(Russia) N Perminova | 21 | 21
(Malaysia) Lee Y Y | 13 | 14
(France) Qi XF | 16 | 17
4 | (Thailand) P Buranaprasertsuk | 21 | 21

Quarter-finals
(Russia) N Perminova | 14 | 19
4 | (Thailand) P Buranaprasertsuk | 21 | 21

==== Section 4 ====
First Round
(United States) D Gupta | 14 | 21 | 10
(India) S U R Chukka | 21 | 17 | 21
Q2 | (Thailand) B Aimsaard | 17 | 22 | 21
8 | (Indonesia) Choirunnisa | 21 | 20 | 12
Q4 | (India) A Kashyap | 21 | 21
(Wales) J Hart | 12 | 18
Q3 | (Thailand) N Aimsaard | 11 | 11
2 | (South Korea) An S-y | 21 | 21

Second Round
(India) S U R Chukka | 10 | 21 | 8
Q2 | (Thailand) B Aimsaard | 21 | 9 | 21
Q4 | (India) A Kashyap | 18 | 13
2 | (South Korea) An S-y | 21 | 21

Quarter-finals
Q2 | (Thailand) B Aimsaard | 17 | 16
2 | (South Korea) An S-y | 21 | 21

== Men's doubles ==
=== Seeds ===
1. (India) Satwiksairaj Rankireddy / Chirag Shetty (withdrew)
2. (India) Manu Attri / B. Sumeeth Reddy (quarter-finals)
3. (Thailand) Bodin Isara / Maneepong Jongjit (first round)
4. (Chinese Taipei) Lee Jhe-huei / Yang Po-hsuan (semi-finals)
5. (China) Ou Xuanyi / Zhang Nan (second round)
6. (China) Huang Kaixiang / Liu Cheng (quarter-finals)
7. (India) Pranav Chopra / Rohan Kapoor (first round)
8. (India) Arjun M.R. / Ramchandran Shlok (quarter-finals)

=== Finals ===
Semi-finals
(Indonesia) Muhammad Shohibul Fikri (Indonesia) Bagas Maulana | 22 | 21
4 | (Chinese Taipei) Lee Jhe-huei (Chinese Taipei) Yang Po-hsuan | 20 | 18
(South Korea) Kang Min-hyuk (South Korea) Kim Jae-hwan | 14 | 15
Q4 | (South Korea) Na Sung-seung (South Korea) Wang Chan | 21 | 21

Final
(Indonesia) Muhammad Shohibul Fikri (Indonesia) Bagas Maulana | 21 | 21
Q4 | (South Korea) Na Sung-seung (South Korea) Wang Chan | 18 | 18

=== Top half ===
==== Section 1 ====
First Round
PFQ | (Malaysia) M A Mohd Sani (Malaysia) M A Mohd Sani | 18 | 21 | 18
(India) Vaibhaav (India) P Raj | 21 | 17 | 21
(Thailand) T Isriyanet (Thailand) K Kedren | 13 | 17
(South Korea) Kim W-h (South Korea) Park K-h | 21 | 21
7 | (India) P Chopra (India) R Kapoor | 18 | 21 | 14
(Indonesia) M S Fikri (Indonesia) B Maulana | 21 | 13 | 21
(India) V Devlekar (India) D Rambhiya | 21 | 21
(India) S V Govindarasu (India) M R Raju | 14 | 19

Second Round
(India) Vaibhaav (India) P Raj | 12 | 12
(South Korea) Kim W-h (South Korea) Park K-h | 21 | 21
(Indonesia) M S Fikri (Indonesia) B Maulana | 21 | 21
(India) V Devlekar (India) D Rambhiya | 12 | 19

Quarter-finals
(South Korea) Kim W-h (South Korea) Park K-h | 21 | 21 | 17
(Indonesia) M S Fikri (Indonesia) B Maulana | 9 | 23 | 21

==== Section 2 ====
First Round
4 | (Chinese Taipei) Lee J-h (Chinese Taipei) Yang P-h | 21 | 21
Q3 | (Thailand) C Charoenkitamorn (Thailand) W Phakjarung | 15 | 8
(India) M Elumalai (India) V Vasudevan | 16 | 21 | 17
(Malaysia) Lim T J (Malaysia) Low J S | 21 | 12 | 21
8 | (India) Arjun M.R. (India) R Shlok | 21 | 21
(India) G Deswal (India) D Khatri | 11 | 8
(Malaysia) Lim K W (Malaysia) Lim Z T | 21 | 18 | 19
(Malaysia) Chia W J (Malaysia) Man W C | 16 | 21 | 21

Second Round
4 | (Chinese Taipei) Lee J-h (Chinese Taipei) Yang P-h | 21 | 22
(Malaysia) Lim T J (Malaysia) Low J S | 13 | 20
8 | (India) Arjun M.R. (India) R Shlok | 18 | 21 | 21
(Malaysia) Chia W J (Malaysia) Man W C | 21 | 13 | 19

Quarter-finals
4 | (Chinese Taipei) Lee J-h (Chinese Taipei) Yang P-h | 21 | 21
8 | (India) Arjun M.R. (India) R Shlok | 19 | 9

=== Bottom half ===
==== Section 3 ====
First Round
(India) V K H Ranganatha (India) A Surya | 15 | 21 | 12
Q1 | (Singapore) T Hee Y K (Singapore) Loh K H | 21 | 19 | 21
(Indonesia) P Kusumawardana (Indonesia) Y Rambitan | 15 | 20
6 | (China) Huang KX (China) Liu C | 21 | 22
(Malaysia) Low H Y (Malaysia) Ng E C | 17 | 22 | 21
(Singapore) D B Chrisnanta (Singapore) A Kwek J L | 21 | 20 | 18
(South Korea) Kang M-h (South Korea) Kim J-h | 21 | 18 | 21
3 | (Thailand) B Isara (Thailand) M Jongjit | 19 | 21 | 11

Second Round
Q1 | (Singapore) T Hee Y K (Singapore) Loh K H | 15 | 17
6 | (China) Huang KX (China) Liu C | 21 | 21
(Malaysia) Low H Y (Malaysia) Ng E C | 19 | 20
(South Korea) Kang M-h (South Korea) Kim J-h | 21 | 22

Quarter-finals
6 | (China) Huang KX (China) Liu C | 19 | 17
(South Korea) Kang M-h (South Korea) Kim J-h | 21 | 21

==== Section 4 ====
First Round
Q4 | (South Korea) Na S-s (South Korea) Wang C | 21 | 21
(India) U Arora (India) S Sharma | 9 | 15
(India) K P Garaga (India) D Kapila | 21 | 15 | 17
5 | (China) Ou XY (China) Zhang N | 18 | 21 | 21
(Thailand) S Jomkoh (Thailand) W Sothon | 9 | 27 | 14
(Thailand) I Apisuk (Thailand) T Viriyangkura | 21 | 25 | 21
Q2 | (Indonesia) K A Haryanto (Indonesia) R A Saputro | 21 | 8 | 13
2 | (India) M Attri (India) B. S Reddy | 16 | 21 | 21

Second Round
Q4 | (South Korea) Na S-s (South Korea) Wang C | 21 | 15 | 21
5 | (China) Ou XY (China) Zhang N | 19 | 21 | 16
(Thailand) I Apisuk (Thailand) T Viriyangkura | 14 | 8
2 | (India) M Attri (India) B. S Reddy | 21 | 21

Quarter-finals
Q4 | (South Korea) Na S-s (South Korea) Wang C | 19 | 21 | 21
2 | (India) M Attri (India) B. S Reddy | 21 | 11 | 17

== Women's doubles ==
=== Seeds ===
1. (India) Ashwini Ponnappa / N. Sikki Reddy (final)
2. (France) Émilie Lefel / Anne Tran (first round)
3. (Thailand) Chayanit Chaladchalam / Phataimas Muenwong (withdrew)
4. (Hong Kong) Ng Wing Yung / Yeung Nga Ting (second round)
5. (Indonesia) Ni Ketut Mahadewi Istarani / Tania Oktaviani Kusumah (first round)
6. (Australia) Setyana Mapasa / Gronya Somerville (withdrew)
7. (India) Pooja Dandu / Sanjana Santosh (second round)
8. (India) Meghana Jakkampudi / Poorvisha S. Ram (quarter-finals)

=== Finals ===
Semi-finals
1 | (India) Ashwini Ponnappa (India) N. Sikki Reddy | 21 | 21
(Hong Kong) Fan Ka Yan (Hong Kong) Wu Yi Ting | 12 | 12
(South Korea) Baek Ha-na (South Korea) Jung Kyung-eun | 21 | 21
(Japan) Akane Araki (Japan) Riko Imai | 10 | 9

Final
1 | (India) Ashwini Ponnappa (India) N. Sikki Reddy | 17 | 17
(South Korea) Baek Ha-na (South Korea) Jung Kyung-eun | 21 | 21

=== Top half ===
==== Section 1 ====
First Round
1 | (India) A Ponnappa (India) N. S Reddy | 21 | 13 | 21
Q2 | (Malaysia) P Tan K L (Malaysia) M Thinaah | 13 | 21 | 16
(Thailand) C Korepap (Thailand) K Sudjaipraparat | 21 | 21
(India) N B Hazarika (India) T Ramesh | 4 | 14
8 | (India) M Jakkampudi (India) P S. Ram | 21 | 21
(India) A Dhankar (India) A Kaushik | 10 | 6
(India) M Dang (India) R Jaiswal | 11 | 5
(Sri Lanka) T P Hendahewa (Sri Lanka) K Sirimannage | 21 | 21

Second Round
1 | (India) A Ponnappa (India) N. S Reddy | 21 | 21
(Thailand) C Korepap (Thailand) K Sudjaipraparat | 19 | 16
8 | (India) M Jakkampudi (India) P S. Ram | 22 | 21
(Sri Lanka) T P Hendahewa (Sri Lanka) K Sirimannage | 20 | 15

Quarter-finals
1 | (India) A Ponnappa (India) N. S Reddy | 21 | 21
8 | (India) M Jakkampudi (India) P S. Ram | 16 | 15

==== Section 2 ====
First Round
4 | (Hong Kong) Ng W Y (Hong Kong) Yeung N T | 21 | 21
(India) R Mookerjee (India) A Prabhudesai | 10 | 13
(India) H Veludurthi (India) A Warang | 16 | 12
(Canada) C Choi (Canada) J Wu | 21 | 21
7 | (India) P Dandu (India) S Santosh | 1
(India) R Panda (India) A S Sunil | 0^{r}
(Hong Kong) Fan K Y (Hong Kong) Wu Y T | 21 | 21
(India) D Choudhary (India) S Christian | 10 | 11

Second Round
4 | (Hong Kong) Ng W Y (Hong Kong) Yeung N T | 21 | 16 | 18
(Canada) C Choi (Canada) J Wu | 11 | 21 | 21
7 | (India) P Dandu (India) S Santosh | 21 | 21 | 18
(Hong Kong) Fan K Y (Hong Kong) Wu Y T | 23 | 16 | 21

Quarter-finals
(Canada) C Choi (Canada) J Wu | 9 | 26
(Hong Kong) Fan K Y (Hong Kong) Wu Y T | 21 | 28

=== Bottom half ===
==== Section 3 ====
First Round
Q3 | (India) K Garg (India) A Parikh | 15 | 16
Q1 | (China) Gao ZY (China) Peng Q | 21 | 21
(South Korea) Chang Y-n (South Korea) Kim H-r | 22 | 21
5 | (Indonesia) N K M Istarani (Indonesia) T O Kusumah | 20 | 9
(Thailand) B Aimsaard (Thailand) N Aimsaard | 16 | 21
(South Korea) Baek H-n (South Korea) Jung K-e | 21 | 23
(Thailand) R Laisuan (Thailand) S Mingchua | 21 | 21
PFQ | (India) A Balan (India) P Sawant | 19 | 15

Second Round
Q1 | (China) Gao ZY (China) Peng Q | 13 | 17
(South Korea) Chang Y-n (South Korea) Kim H-r | 21 | 21
(South Korea) Baek H-n (South Korea) Jung K-e | 21 | 21
(Thailand) R Laisuan (Thailand) S Mingchua | 13 | 15

Quarter-finals
(South Korea) Chang Y-n (South Korea) Kim H-r | 21 | 19 | 16
(South Korea) Baek H-n (South Korea) Jung K-e | 13 | 21 | 21

==== Section 4 ====
First Round
(Japan) A Araki (Japan) R Imai | 21 | 21
(India) H M Harinarayanan (India) S Sharma | 9 | 6
Q4 | (India) B V R T Bailupudi (India) P Prabhu Chimulkar | w | / | o
6 | (Australia) S Mapasa (Australia) G Somerville
(India) S Singhi (India) R Thaker | 16 | 10
PFQ | (South Korea) Jang E-s (South Korea) Jeong N-e | 21 | 21
(Indonesia) S F S Ramadhanti (Indonesia) R Sugiarto | 21 | 21
2 | (France) É Lefel (France) A Tran | 11 | 11

Second Round
(Japan) A Araki (Japan) R Imai | 21 | 21
Q4 | (India) B V R T Bailupudi (India) P Prabhu Chimulkar | 10 | 14
PFQ | (South Korea) Jang E-s (South Korea) Jeong N-e | 21 | 19 | 21
(Indonesia) S F S Ramadhanti (Indonesia) R Sugiarto | 15 | 21 | 16

Quarter-finals
(Japan) A Araki (Japan) R Imai | 21 | 19 | 21
PFQ | (South Korea) Jang E-s (South Korea) Jeong N-e | 18 | 21 | 16

== Mixed doubles ==
=== Seeds ===
1. (India) Pranav Chopra / N. Sikki Reddy (second round)
2. (India) Satwiksairaj Rankireddy / Ashwini Ponnappa (withdrew)
3. (Malaysia) Chen Tang Jie / Peck Yen Wei (second round)
4. (Canada) Joshua Hurlburt-Yu / Josephine Wu (second round)
5. (Hong Kong) Mak Hee Chun / Chau Hoi Wah (withdrew)
6. (India) Saurabh Sharma / Anoushka Parikh (first round)
7. (Singapore) Danny Bawa Chrisnanta / Tan Wei Han (withdrew)
8. (India) Rohan Kapoor / Kuhoo Garg (second round)

=== Finals ===
Semi-finals
(Indonesia) Adnan Maulana (Indonesia) Mychelle Crhystine Bandaso | 19 | 21 | 21
(Denmark) Mathias Christiansen (Denmark) Alexandra Bøje | 21 | 16 | 17
(Malaysia) Hoo Pang Ron (Malaysia) Cheah Yee See | 17 | 21 | 21
Q1 | (Thailand) Ratchapol Makkasasithorn (Thailand) Benyapa Aimsaard | 21 | 15 | 15

Final
(Indonesia) Adnan Maulana (Indonesia) Mychelle Crhystine Bandaso | 21 | 16 | 11
(Malaysia) Hoo Pang Ron (Malaysia) Cheah Yee See | 16 | 21 | 21

=== Top half ===
==== Section 1 ====
First Round
1 | (India) P Chopra (India) N. S Reddy | 21 | 21
PFR | (India) S Yadav (India) S Sharma | 9 | 8
(India) K P Garaga (India) P S. Ram | 19 | 21 | 11
(Indonesia) A Ramadiansyah (Indonesia) B F Romadhini | 21 | 19 | 21
6 | (India) S Sharma (India) A Parikh | 14 | 14
(Indonesia) A Maulana (Indonesia) M C Bandaso | 21 | 21
(Thailand) V Kanjanakeereewong (Thailand) R Laisuan | 15 | 15
(South Korea) Kim W-h (South Korea) Kim H-r | 21 | 21

Second Round
1 | (India) P Chopra (India) N. S Reddy | 21 | 13 | 11
(Indonesia) A Ramadiansyah (Indonesia) B F Romadhini | 11 | 21 | 21
(Indonesia) A Maulana (Indonesia) M C Bandaso | 21 | 18 | 22
(South Korea) Kim W-h (South Korea) Kim H-r | 19 | 21 | 20

Quarter-finals
(Indonesia) A Ramadiansyah (Indonesia) B F Romadhini | 13 | 14
(Indonesia) A Maulana (Indonesia) M C Bandaso | 21 | 21

==== Section 2 ====
First Round
4 | (Canada) J Hurlburt-Yu (Canada) J Wu | 15 | 21 | 21
(India) Arjun M.R. (India) K. Maneesha | 21 | 15 | 14
(Thailand) W Phakrajung (Thailand) C Korepap | 21 | 16 | 14
(Indonesia) R N Kusharjanto (Indonesia) L A Kusumawati | 17 | 21 | 21
PFQ | (Malaysia) Man W C (Malaysia) P Tan K L | 19 | 17
(Denmark) M Christiansen (Denmark) A Bøje | 21 | 21
(India) M R Raju (India) A K Jamaludeen | 5 | 16
Q2 | (South Korea) Na S-s (South Korea) Jang E-s | 21 | 21

Second Round
4 | (Canada) J Hurlburt-Yu (Canada) J Wu | 19 | 27 | 19
(Indonesia) R N Kusharjanto (Indonesia) L A Kusumawati | 21 | 25 | 21
(Denmark) M Christiansen (Denmark) A Bøje | 21 | 18 | 21
Q2 | (South Korea) Na S-s (South Korea) Jang E-s | 19 | 21 | 11

Quarter-finals
(Indonesia) R N Kusharjanto (Indonesia) L A Kusumawati | 15 | 21 | 15
(Denmark) M Christiansen (Denmark) A Bøje | 21 | 15 | 21

=== Bottom half ===
==== Section 3 ====
First Round
(India) U Arora (India) K Wadkar | 19 | 16
(Hong Kong) Yeung S C (Hong Kong) Fan K Y | 21 | 21
(United States) V Chiu (United States) B Chi | 17 | 16
PFQ | (Thailand) T Viriyangkura (Thailand) K Sudjaipraparat | 21 | 21
Q3 | (Hong Kong) Law C H (Hong Kong) Wu Y T | 12 | 13
(Malaysia) Hoo P R (Malaysia) Cheah Y S | 21 | 21
(India) S. Sunjith Jr. (India) S Kurien | 12 | 11
3 | (Malaysia) Chen T J (Malaysia) Peck Y W | 21 | 21

Second Round
(Hong Kong) Yeung S C (Hong Kong) Fan K Y | 21 | 10 | 10
PFQ | (Thailand) T Viriyangkura (Thailand) K Sudjaipraparat | 19 | 21 | 21
(Malaysia) Hoo P R (Malaysia) Cheah Y S | 21 | 21
3 | (Malaysia) Chen T J (Malaysia) Peck Y W | 16 | 19

Quarter-finals
PFQ | (Thailand) T Viriyangkura (Thailand) K Sudjaipraparat | 19 | 23 | 19
(Malaysia) Hoo P R (Malaysia) Cheah Y S | 21 | 21 | 21

==== Section 4 ====
First Round
Q1 | (Thailand) R Makkasasithorn (Thailand) B Aimsaard | 15 | 21 | 21
(South Korea) Park K-h (South Korea) Baek H-n | 21 | 19 | 15
(India) N Dua (India) D Choudhary | 8 | 11
8 | (India) R Kapoor (India) K Garg | 21 | 21
(India) V Devlekar (India) P Sawant | 21 | 21
Q4 | (India) R Shlok (India) R Panda | 14 | 15
(Thailand) S Jomkoh (Thailand) S Paewsampran | w | / | o
2 | (India) S Rankireddy (India) A Ponnappa

Second Round
Q1 | (Thailand) R Makkasasithorn (Thailand) B Aimsaard | 21 | 21
8 | (India) R Kapoor (India) K Garg | 9 | 12
(India) V Devlekar (India) P Sawant | 23 | 21 | 13
(Thailand) S Jomkoh (Thailand) S Paewsampran | 25 | 16 | 21

Quarter-finals
Q1 | (Thailand) R Makkasasithorn (Thailand) B Aimsaard | 21 | 21
(Thailand) S Jomkoh (Thailand) S Paewsampran | 19 | 17

| Preceded by 2018 Hyderabad Open | Hyderabad Open | Succeeded by 2020 Hyderabad Open |
| Preceded by 2019 Thailand Open | BWF World Tour; 2019 BWF season | Succeeded by 2019 Akita Masters |
