= Akira Koga =

Japanese badminton player (born 1994)

Personal information
- Born: 8 March 1994 (age 32) Fukuoka Prefecture, Japan
- Height: 1.68 m (5 ft 6 in)
- Weight: 75 kg (165 lb)

Sport
- Country: Japan
- Sport: Badminton
- Handedness: Right
- Coached by: Shu Wada

Men's & mixed doubles
- Highest ranking: 13 (XD with Natsu Saito, 10 November 2026); 14 (MD with Taichi Saito, 12 December 2023)
- Current ranking: 13 (XD with Natsu Saito, 10 November 2026)
- BWF profile
Medal record
Men's badminton
Representing Japan
Sudirman Cup
Silver medal – second place	2021 Vantaa	Mixed team
Bronze medal – third place	2023 Suzhou	Mixed team
Thomas Cup
Bronze medal – third place	2020 Aarhus	Men's team
Bronze medal – third place	2022 Bangkok	Men's team
Asian Games
Bronze medal – third place	2022 Hangzhou	Men's team
Asia Team Championships
Bronze medal – third place	2020 Manila	Men's team
Bronze medal – third place	2024 Selangor	Men's team
World Junior Championships
Silver medal – second place	2012 Chiba	Mixed team
Asia Junior Championships
Gold medal – first place	2012 Gimcheon	Mixed team

Akira Koga (古賀 輝, Koga Akira; born 8 March 1994) is a Japanese badminton player who competes in doubles. He plays for the JTEKT badminton team and is a member of the Japanese national team. He was a member of the Japanese junior team that won a gold medal at the 2012 Asian Junior Championships and a silver medal at the 2012 World Junior Championships. In his senior career, Koga has primarily competed in men's doubles with his partner Taichi Saito. He won a silver medal with the Japanese team at the 2021 Sudirman Cup, and has won multiple bronze medals at the Thomas Cup and the Asian Games.

== Early career ==
=== Junior career ===
Koga began playing badminton during elementary school in his hometown of Fukuoka, influenced by his parents; his father coached a junior team, and his mother had played at the university level. He later attended Saitama Sakae Junior and Senior High Schools. During his junior career, he won several national titles, including the doubles title at the 2008 All Japan Junior High School Championships and the 2010 JOC Junior Olympic Cup. In 2011, he won the singles title at the National High School Championships (Inter-High), defeating Kento Momota in the final.

In 2012, he contributed to Japan's first mixed team title at the Asian Junior Championships and a silver medal at the World Junior Championships. In the World Junior team final against China, he and partner Akane Yamaguchi lost the decisive mixed doubles match 22–24 in the third game to Zheng Siwei and Chen Qingchen.

=== University career ===
From 2012 to 2016, Koga studied at the Faculty of Sport Sciences at Waseda University, where he formed a men's doubles partnership with fellow student Taichi Saito. The pair won the All Japan Inter-Collegiate Championships three times (2012, 2013, and 2015). During his second year, Koga sustained a stress fracture that required surgery, hindering his performance for the remainder of the 2013 season. In his final year, he served as team captain and received the Athletics Honorary Award and the Azusa Ono Memorial Award.

== Career ==
=== 2016: Competition suspension ===
After graduating from Waseda University in 2016, Koga joined the NTT East badminton team. In April, amid an illegal gambling scandal involving fellow NTT East players Kento Momota, Kenichi Tago and several other players, Koga was removed from the Japanese national team and suspended from competition for one year by the Nippon Badminton Association for his involvement in illegal gambling. His suspension was set to run until April 2017.

=== 2017–2024: Partnership with Taichi Saito ===
Following his suspension, Koga resumed his senior career with Taichi Saito. The pair won consecutive national titles at the Japan Ranking Circuit in 2017 and 2018 and secured their first international title at the 2018 South Australia International. On the BWF World Tour, they finished as runners-up at four tournaments: the Orléans Masters, the Akita Masters, and the Indonesia Masters in 2019, and the Syed Modi International in 2023. They also reached the semifinals of the 2021 Indonesia Open Super 1000 and the 2023 Canada Open Super 500. Representing Japan in team events, Koga won a silver medal at the 2021 Sudirman Cup. He has also won bronze medals at the Thomas Cup and the Asian Games.

=== 2025: New partnerships and first World Tour title ===
Following Saito's retirement, Koga transferred to the JTEKT Stingers in 2025. He formed a new men's doubles pairing with Naoya Kawashima, with whom he won the Saipan International and finished as runner-up at the Northern Marianas International. In the same year, Koga began competing in mixed doubles with Yuho Imai, securing his first World Tour title at the Super 100 Kaohsiung Masters. The pair also won the Mexican International and the Northern Marianas Open, and were runners-up at the Northern Marianas International. In late 2025, Koga competed with temporary partners in mixed doubles, reaching quarterfinals at the Korea Masters with Hina Osawa and the semifinals of the Japan Masters with Misaki Matsutomo.

=== 2026: First Super 300 title ===
Koga formed a new mixed doubles partnership with Natsu Saito. The pair made their international debut at the season-opening Malaysia Open, where they reached the second round, before advancing to the semifinals of the Thailand Masters. In July, the pair won the Canada Open, marking Koga's first Super 300 title.

Later in the season they reached the semifinals of the Japan Open and the quarterfinals of the Denmark Open, where they defeated the reigning world champions Thom Gicquel and Delphine Delrue.

== Achievements ==
=== BWF World Tour (2 titles, 4 runners-up) ===
The BWF World Tour, which was announced on 19 March 2017 and implemented in 2018, is a series of elite badminton tournaments sanctioned by the Badminton World Federation (BWF). The BWF World Tour is divided into levels of World Tour Finals, Super 1000, Super 750, Super 500, Super 300, and the BWF Tour Super 100.

Men's doubles
Year	Tournament	Level	Partner	Opponent	Score	Result	Ref.
2019	Orléans Masters	Super 100	(Japan) Taichi Saito	(Chinese Taipei) Lee Yang (Chinese Taipei) Wang Chi-lin	21–16, 20–22, 15–21	(silver) Runner-up	
2019	Akita Masters	Super 100	(Japan) Taichi Saito	(China) Ou Xuanyi (China) Zhang Nan	14–21, 19–21	(silver) Runner-up	
2019	Indonesia Masters	Super 100	(Japan) Taichi Saito	(China) Ou Xuanyi (China) Zhang Nan	21–11, 10–21, 20–22	(silver) Runner-up	
2023	Syed Modi International	Super 300	(Japan) Taichi Saito	(Malaysia) Choong Hon Jian (Malaysia) Muhammad Haikal	21–18, 18–21, 16–21	(silver) Runner-up	

Mixed doubles
Year	Tournament	Level	Partner	Opponent	Score	Result	Ref.
2025	Kaohsiung Masters	Super 100	(Japan) Yuho Imai	(Chinese Taipei) Wu Hsuan-yi (Chinese Taipei) Yang Chu-yun	16–21, 21–13, 21–15	(gold) Winner	
2026	Canada Open	Super 300	(Japan) Natsu Saito	(Chinese Taipei) Liu Kuang-heng (Chinese Taipei) Hsu Yin-hui	21–17, 17–21, 21–17	(gold) Winner	

=== BWF International Challenge/Series (4 titles, 2 runners-up) ===
Men's doubles
Year	Tournament	Partner	Opponent	Score	Result	Ref.
2018	South Australia International	(Japan) Taichi Saito	(Singapore) Danny Bawa Chrisnanta (Singapore) Terry Hee	21–11, 19–21, 21–16	(gold) Winner	
2025	Northern Marianas International	(Japan) Naoya Kawashima	(South Korea) Kim Jae-hyeon (South Korea) Lee Sang-won	16–21, 15–21	(silver) Runner-up	
2025	Saipan International	(Japan) Naoya Kawashima	(Japan) Haruki Kawabe (Japan) Kenta Matsukawa	15–13, 15–12	(gold) Winner	

Mixed doubles
Year	Tournament	Partner	Opponent	Score	Result	Ref.
2025	Mexican International	(Japan) Yuho Imai	(Brazil) Davi Silva (Brazil) Sânia Lima	15–8, 9–15, 15–9	(gold) Winner	
2025	Northern Marianas International	(Japan) Yuho Imai	(South Korea) Kim Jae-hyeon (South Korea) Kim Min-ji	13–21, 21–16, 18–21	(silver) Runner-up	
2025	Northern Marianas Open	(Japan) Yuho Imai	(Japan) Haruki Kawabe (Japan) Kokona Ishikawa	21–19, 21–13	(gold) Winner	

BWF International Challenge tournament
BWF International Series tournament

== Record against selected opponents ==
Record against year-end Finals finalists, World Championships semi-finalists, and Olympic quarter-finalists. Accurate as of 7 November 2026.

=== Natsu Saito ===
Players	M	W	L	Diff.
(China) Feng Yanzhe & Huang Dongping	2	0	2	–2
(China) Guo Xinwa & Chen Fanghui	1	0	1	–1
(China) Jiang Zhenbang & Wei Yaxin	1	0	1	–1

Players	M	W	L	Diff.
(France) Thom Gicquel & Delphine Delrue	1	1	0	+1
(Indonesia) Amri Syahnawi & Nita Violina Marwah	1	0	1	–1

=== Taichi Saito ===
Players	M	W	L	Diff.
(China) He Jiting & Tan Qiang	1	0	1	–1
(China) Li Junhui & Liu Yuchen	1	0	1	–1
(China) Liang Weikeng & Wang Chang	2	1	1	0
(China) Liu Yuchen & Ou Xuanyi	6	1	5	–4
(Chinese Taipei) Lee Jhe-huei & Yang Po-hsuan	2	0	2	–2
(Chinese Taipei) Lee Yang & Wang Chi-lin	6	1	5	–4
(Denmark) Kim Astrup & Anders Skaarup Rasmussen	3	1	2	–1
(India) Satwiksairaj Rankireddy & Chirag Shetty	4	2	2	0
(Indonesia) Mohammad Ahsan & Hendra Setiawan	3	0	3	–3
(Indonesia) Fajar Alfian & Muhammad Rian Ardianto	6	1	5	–4
(Indonesia) Marcus Fernaldi Gideon & Kevin Sanjaya Sukamuljo	2	0	2	–2

Players	M	W	L	Diff.
(Japan) Takeshi Kamura & Keigo Sonoda	2	0	2	–2
(Japan) Takuro Hoki & Yugo Kobayashi	6	2	4	–2
(Malaysia) Aaron Chia & Soh Wooi Yik	9	4	5	–1
(Malaysia) Goh Sze Fei & Nur Izzuddin	4	3	1	+2
(Malaysia) Goh V Shem & Tan Wee Kiong	1	0	1	–1
(Malaysia) Ong Yew Sin & Teo Ee Yi	2	0	2	–2
(South Korea) Kang Min-hyuk & Seo Seung-jae	2	0	2	–2
(South Korea) Ko Sung-hyun & Shin Baek-cheol	6	1	5	–4
(Thailand) Bodin Isara & Maneepong Jongjit	1	0	1	–1
(Thailand) Supak Jomkoh & Kittinupong Kedren	1	1	0	+1
