= Taichi Saito =

Japanese badminton player (born 1993)

Personal information
- Born: 21 April 1993 (age 33) Chiba, Japan

Sport
- Country: Japan
- Sport: Badminton
- Handedness: Right
- Coached by: Tan Kim Her
- Retired: 31 May 2024

Men's doubles
- Career record: 130 wins, 94 losses
- Highest ranking: 14 (with Akira Koga, 12 December 2023)
- BWF profile
Medal record
Men's badminton
Representing Japan
Sudirman Cup
| Silver medal – second place | 2021 Vantaa | Mixed team |
| Bronze medal – third place | 2023 Suzhou | Mixed team |
Thomas Cup
| Bronze medal – third place | 2020 Aarhus | Men's team |
| Bronze medal – third place | 2022 Bangkok | Men's team |
Asian Games
| Bronze medal – third place | 2022 Hangzhou | Men's team |
Asia Team Championships
| Bronze medal – third place | 2020 Manila | Men's team |
| Bronze medal – third place | 2024 Selangor | Men's team |

Taichi Saito (齋藤 太一, Saitō Taichi; born 21 April 1993) is a Japanese badminton player affiliated with NTT East club.

== Achievements ==
=== BWF World Tour (4 runners-up) ===
The BWF World Tour, which was announced on 19 March 2017 and implemented in 2018, is a series of elite badminton tournaments sanctioned by the Badminton World Federation (BWF). The BWF World Tour is divided into levels of World Tour Finals, Super 1000, Super 750, Super 500, Super 300, and the BWF Tour Super 100.

Men's doubles
| Year | Tournament | Level | Partner | Opponent | Score | Result | Ref. |
|---|---|---|---|---|---|---|---|
| 2019 | Orléans Masters | Super 100 | (Japan) Akira Koga | (Chinese Taipei) Lee Yang (Chinese Taipei) Wang Chi-lin | 21–16, 20–22, 15–21 | (silver) Runner-up | |
| 2019 | Akita Masters | Super 100 | (Japan) Akira Koga | (China) Ou Xuanyi (China) Zhang Nan | 14–21, 19–21 | (silver) Runner-up | |
| 2019 | Indonesia Masters | Super 100 | (Japan) Akira Koga | (China) Ou Xuanyi (China) Zhang Nan | 21–11, 10–21, 20–22 | (silver) Runner-up | |
| 2023 | Syed Modi International | Super 300 | (Japan) Akira Koga | (Malaysia) Choong Hon Jian (Malaysia) Muhammad Haikal | 21–18, 18–21, 16–21 | (silver) Runner-up | |

=== BWF International Challenge/Series (1 title) ===
Men's doubles
| Year | Tournament | Partner | Opponent | Score | Result | Ref. |
|---|---|---|---|---|---|---|
| 2018 | South Australia International | (Japan) Akira Koga | (Singapore) Danny Bawa Chrisnanta (Singapore) Terry Hee | 21–11, 19–21, 21–16 | (gold) Winner | |

BWF International Challenge tournament

== Record against selected opponents ==
Record against year-end Finals finalists, World Championships semi-finalists, and Olympic quarter-finalists. Accurate as of 23 August 2026.

=== Akira Koga ===
| Players | M | W | L | Diff. |
|---|---|---|---|---|
| (China) He Jiting & Tan Qiang | 1 | 0 | 1 | –1 |
| (China) Li Junhui & Liu Yuchen | 1 | 0 | 1 | –1 |
| (China) Liang Weikeng & Wang Chang | 2 | 1 | 1 | 0 |
| (China) Liu Yuchen & Ou Xuanyi | 6 | 1 | 5 | –4 |
| (Chinese Taipei) Lee Jhe-huei & Yang Po-hsuan | 2 | 0 | 2 | –2 |
| (Chinese Taipei) Lee Yang & Wang Chi-lin | 6 | 1 | 5 | –4 |
| (Denmark) Kim Astrup & Anders Skaarup Rasmussen | 3 | 1 | 2 | –1 |
| (India) Satwiksairaj Rankireddy & Chirag Shetty | 4 | 2 | 2 | 0 |
| (Indonesia) Mohammad Ahsan & Hendra Setiawan | 3 | 0 | 3 | –3 |
| (Indonesia) Fajar Alfian & Muhammad Rian Ardianto | 6 | 1 | 5 | –4 |
| (Indonesia) Marcus Fernaldi Gideon & Kevin Sanjaya Sukamuljo | 2 | 0 | 2 | –2 |

| Players | M | W | L | Diff. |
|---|---|---|---|---|
| (Japan) Takeshi Kamura & Keigo Sonoda | 2 | 0 | 2 | –2 |
| (Japan) Takuro Hoki & Yugo Kobayashi | 6 | 2 | 4 | –2 |
| (Malaysia) Aaron Chia & Soh Wooi Yik | 9 | 4 | 5 | –1 |
| (Malaysia) Goh Sze Fei & Nur Izzuddin | 4 | 3 | 1 | +2 |
| (Malaysia) Goh V Shem & Tan Wee Kiong | 1 | 0 | 1 | –1 |
| (Malaysia) Ong Yew Sin & Teo Ee Yi | 2 | 0 | 2 | –2 |
| (South Korea) Kang Min-hyuk & Seo Seung-jae | 2 | 0 | 2 | –2 |
| (South Korea) Ko Sung-hyun & Shin Baek-cheol | 6 | 1 | 5 | –4 |
| (Thailand) Bodin Isara & Maneepong Jongjit | 1 | 0 | 1 | –1 |
| (Thailand) Supak Jomkoh & Kittinupong Kedren | 1 | 1 | 0 | +1 |
