= 2017 Russia Open Grand Prix =

Tournament details
- Dates: 18–23 July 2017
- Level: Grand Prix
- Total prize money: US$65,000
- Venue: Sport Hall Olympic
- Location: Vladivostok, Russia

Champions
- Men's singles: (Russia) Sergey Sirant
- Women's singles: (Russia) Evgeniya Kosetskaya
- Men's doubles: (Russia) Vladimir Ivanov (Russia) Ivan Sozonov
- Women's doubles: (Japan) Aoi Matsuda (Japan) Akane Araki
- Mixed doubles: (Malaysia) Chan Peng Soon (Malaysia) Cheah Yee See

The 2017 Russia Open Grand Prix is the tenth Grand Prix tournament of the 2017 BWF Grand Prix Gold and Grand Prix. The tournament was held at the Sport Hall Olympic in Vladivostok, Russia on 18–23 July 2017 and has a total purse of $65,000. The tournament is organized by the National Badminton Federation of Russia, and the scoring system of best of 5 games of 11 points will be used.

== Men's singles ==
=== Seeds ===
1. (India) Sourabh Verma (withdrew)
2. (Russia) Vladimir Malkov (final)
3. (Malaysia) Soong Joo Ven (third round)
4. (India) Subhankar Dey (third round)
5. (Russia) Sergey Sirant (champion)
6. (Ukraine) Artem Pochtarov (third round)
7. (Czech Republic) Milan Ludík (second round)
8. (India) Anand Pawar (quarterfinals)

=== Finals ===
Quarterfinals
(Russia) Anatoliy Yartsev	7	11	7	5
5	(Russia) Sergey Sirant	11	9	11	11
(Japan) Ryotaro Maruo	8	11	11	6	11
(Japan) Haruki Fukuda	11	9	7	11	7
(England) Yuehang Wang	11	5	6
(India) Rahul Yadav Chittaboina	13	11	11
8	(India) Anand Pawar	4	11	8	3
2	(Russia) Vladimir Malkov	11	7	11	11

Semifinals
5	(Russia) Sergey Sirant	11	11	12
(Japan) Ryotaro Maruo	7	9	10
(India) Rahul Yadav Chittaboina	11	10	11	6	8
2	(Russia) Vladimir Malkov	5	12	7	11	11

Final
5	(Russia) Sergey Sirant	13	11	6	7	11
2	(Russia) Vladimir Malkov	11	5	11	11	4

=== Top half ===
==== Section 1 ====
First round
1	(India) So Verma
BYE
(Russia) A Yartsev
BYE
(Russia) S Iakovlev
BYE
(Russia) K Timofeev	5	2	2
(England) H S Wong	11	11	11

Second round
1	(India) So Verma
(Russia) A Yartsev	w	/	o
(Russia) S Iakovlev	10	8	3
(England) H S Wong	11	11	11

Third round
(Russia) A Yartsev	11	11	11
(England) H S Wong	8	6	5

==== Section 2 ====
First round
5	(Russia) S Sirant
BYE
(Russia) A Derbenev	6	2	6
(Azerbaijan) O Galandarov	11	11	11
(Russia) D Grachev
BYE
(India) S Thakur	11	11	11
(Russia) A Kokarev	1	7	8

Second round
5	(Russia) S Sirant	11	11	11
(Azerbaijan) O Galandarov	2	2	2
(Russia) D Grachev	11	6	11	11
(India) S Thakur	9	11	3	3

Third round
5	(Russia) S Sirant	5	11	11	14
(Russia) D Grachev	11	3	8	12

==== Section 3 ====
First round
3	(Malaysia) Soong J V
BYE
(India) C. R Yadav
BYE
(Japan) R Maruo
BYE
(Russia) A Parakhodin	12	4	3
(India) Si Verma	14	11	11

Second round
3	(Malaysia) Soong J V	w	/	o
(India) C. R Yadav
(Japan) R Maruo	11	5	11	11
(India) Si Verma	7	11	5	7

Third round
3	(Malaysia) Soong J V	13	5	11	5	10
(Japan) R Maruo	11	11	8	11	12

==== Section 4 ====
First round
6	(Ukraine) A Pochtarov
BYE
(India) A Joshi	11	11	11
(Russia) A Panov	0	0	5
(India) S Jaiswal
BYE
(Russia) A Butovetstkiy	7	6	4
(Japan) H Fukuda	11	11	11

Second round
6	(Ukraine) A Pochtarov	7	11	11	5	11
(India) A Joshi	11	7	4	11	4
(India) S Jaiswal	9	11	9	10
(Japan) H Fukuda	11	4	11	12

Third round
6	(Ukraine) A Pochtarov	11	4	8	10
(Japan) H Fukuda	6	11	11	12

=== Bottom half ===
==== Section 5 ====
First round
(Russia) V Shipilenko	4	5	6
(Japan) K Hoshino	11	11	11
BYE
(Russia) A Ivanov
(India) H Aggarwal	9	11	11	7	2
(England) Y Wang	11	8	7	11	11
BYE
7	(Czech Republic) M Ludík

Second round
(Japan) K Hoshino	11	11	11
(Russia) A Ivanov	9	9	4
(England) Y Wang	11	11	11
7	(Czech Republic) M Ludík	6	6	8

Third round
(Japan) K Hoshino	11	9	9	11	9
(England) Y Wang	9	11	11	4	11

==== Section 6 ====
First round
(India) R. Y Chittaboina	11	11	11
(Japan) K Naito	5	8	5
BYE
(Russia) A Serpionov
BYE
(France) T Rouxel
BYE
4	(India) S Dey

Second round
(India) R. Y Chittaboina	11	11	11
(Russia) A Serpionov	2	1	4
(France) T Rouxel	11	11	6	4
4	(India) S Dey	6	13	11	11

Third round
(India) R. Y Chittaboina	11	11	11	11
4	(India) S Dey	13	4	6	7

==== Section 7 ====
First round
(Malaysia) Lim C W	11	11	11
(Russia) P Kotsarenko	4	4	4
BYE
(Russia) V Nikulov
(England) H L Ngan	6	10	11	11	11
(Russia) A Khamidulin	11	12	7	8	6
BYE
8	(India) A Pawar

Second round
(Malaysia) Lim C W	11	11	11
(Russia) V Nikulov	5	3	3
(England) H L Ngan	4	6	7
8	(India) A Pawar	11	11	11

Third round
(Malaysia) Lim C W	12	6	7	10
8	(India) A Pawar	10	11	11	12

==== Section 8 ====
First round
(Russia) A Kozyrev	11	7	11	11
(Azerbaijan) K Rzayev	7	11	8	8
BYE
(Uzbekistan) A Savatyugin
BYE
(Belgium) M Moreels
BYE
2	(Russia) V Malkov

Second round
(Russia) A Kozyrev	9	11	11	11
(Uzbekistan) A Savatyugin	11	7	5	8
(Belgium) M Moreels	5	7	6
2	(Russia) V Malkov	11	11	11

Third round
(Russia) A Kozyrev	4	11	5	4
2	(Russia) V Malkov	11	6	11	11

== Women's singles ==
=== Seeds ===
1. (Malaysia) Sonia Cheah Su Ya (final)
2. (Russia) Evgeniya Kosetskaya (champion)
3. (Russia) Natalia Perminova (semifinals)
4. (Japan) Natsuki Nidaira (semifinals)
5. (Japan) Shiori Saito (quarterfinals)
6. (India) Rasika Raje (quarterfinals)
7. (Russia) Victoria Slobodyanyuk (quarterfinals)
8. (Russia) Ksenia Evgenova (first round)

=== Finals ===
Semifinals
1	(Malaysia) Sonia Cheah Su Ya	12	12	11	11
3	(Russia) Natalia Perminova	10	14	2	3
4	(Japan) Natsuki Nidaira	11	8	10	6
2	(Russia) Evgeniya Kosetskaya	5	11	12	11

Final
1	(Malaysia) Sonia Cheah Su Ya	9	11	5	11	4
2	(Russia) Evgeniya Kosetskaya	11	5	11	5	11

=== Top half ===
==== Section 1 ====
First round
1	(Malaysia) Sonia Cheah S Y	11	11	11
PFQ	(Russia) A Romanko	3	2	2
(Russia) A Semenova	8	5	6
(India) A Prabhudesai	11	11	11
5	(Japan) S Saito	11	11	11
(Russia) M Malygina	6	2	4
Q1	(Russia) V Vorobeva	11	15	11
(Russia) D Dzhedzhla	1	14	6

Second round
1	(Malaysia) Sonia Cheah S Y	11	11	11
(India) A Prabhudesai	5	8	7
5	(Japan) S Saito	11	6	11	9	11
Q1	(Russia) V Vorobeva	3	11	7	11	7

Quarterfinals
1	(Malaysia) Sonia Cheah S Y	11	11	11
5	(Japan) S Saito	8	4	4

==== Section 2 ====
First round
3	(Russia) N Perminova	11	11	11
(France) Y Hoyaux	8	7	8
(Russia) D Radchenko	8	10	11	11	11
Q3	(Russia) P Makkoveeva	11	12	8	7	7
8	(Russia) K Evgenova	7	2	5
(India) V Gummadi	11	11	11
(Azerbaijan) A Mehdiyeva	4	4	4
(Russia) A Sharapova	11	11	11

Second round
3	(Russia) N Perminova	11	11	11
(Russia) D Radchenko	2	7	5
(India) V Gummadi	11	15	11
(Russia) A Sharapova	8	14	6

Quarterfinals
3	(Russia) N Perminova	8	11	10	11	11
(India) V Gummadi	11	8	12	9	9

=== Bottom half ===
==== Section 3 ====
First round
Q4	(Japan) M Kawashima	11	11	11
(Russia) J Zapolskaya	2	1	2
(Russia) S Doroshenko	7	5	3
6	(India) R Raje	11	11	11
(India) S Gautam	11	11	9	11
(Russia) E Kut	6	5	11	5
(Russia) O Kister	4	5	6
4	(Japan) N Nidaira	11	11	11

Second round
Q4	(Japan) M Kawashima	11	7	14
6	(India) R Raje	13	11	15
(India) S Gautam	3	11	6
4	(Japan) N Nidaira	11	13	11

Quarterfinals
6	(India) R Raje	2	4	7
4	(Japan) N Nidaira	11	11	11

==== Section 4 ====
First round
(Russia) O Arkhangelskaya	8	11	7	11	11
(France) M Batomene	11	6	11	3	9
(Azerbaijan) Z Huseynova	1	4	1
7	(Russia) V Slobodyanyuk	11	11	11
Q2	(Russia) E Nesterenko	8	1	6
(Russia) E Pyatina	11	11	11
(Russia) A Redkina	4	7	7
2	(Russia) E Kosetskaya	11	11	11

Second round
(Russia) O Arkhangelskaya	11	14	8	9
7	(Russia) V Slobodyanyuk	8	15	11	11
(Russia) E Pyatina	3	3	7
2	(Russia) E Kosetskaya	11	11	11

Quarterfinals
7	(Russia) V Slobodyanyuk	9	7	4
2	(Russia) E Kosetskaya	11	11	11

== Men's doubles ==
=== Seeds ===
1. (Russia) Vladimir Ivanov / Ivan Sozonov (champion)
2. (Malaysia) Chooi Kah Ming / Low Juan Shen (final)
3. (Russia) Evgenij Dremin / Denis Grachev (quarterfinals)
4. (India) Arjun M. R. / Ramchandran Shlok (semifinals)

=== Finals ===
Semifinals

Final

1
- (Russia) Vladimir Ivanov
- (Russia) Ivan Sozonov
11
11
11

4
- (India) Arjun M. R.
- (India) Ramchandran Shlok
3
2
4

1
- (Russia) Vladimir Ivanov
- (Russia) Ivan Sozonov
11
11
11

2
- (Malaysia) Chooi Kah Ming
- (Malaysia) Low Juan Shen
6
9
5

- (Russia) Konstantin Abramov
- (Russia) Alexandr Zinchenko
6
9
11
6

2
- (Malaysia) Chooi Kah Ming
- (Malaysia) Low Juan Shen
11
11
9
11

=== Top half ===
==== Section 1 ====
First round

Second round

Quarterfinals

1
- (Russia) V Ivanov
- (Russia) I Sozonov

BYE

1
- (Russia) V Ivanov
- (Russia) I Sozonov
11
11
11

- (Russia) Y Ismogilov
- (Ukraine) A Pochtarov
2
3
7

- (Russia) Y Ismogilov
- (Ukraine) A Pochtarov

BYE

1
- (Russia) V Ivanov
- (Russia) I Sozonov
10
11
11
15

- (Japan) K Matsui
- (Japan) Y Takeuchi
12
8
6
14

- (Azerbaijan) O Galandarov
- (Azerbaijan) K Rzayev

BYE

- (Azerbaijan) O Galandarov
- (Azerbaijan) K Rzayev
4
4
7

- (Japan) K Matsui
- (Japan) Y Takeuchi
11
11
11

- (Japan) K Matsui
- (Japan) Y Takeuchi

BYE

==== Section 2 ====
First round

Second round

Quarterfinals

4
- (India) Arjun M. R.
- (India) R Shlok

BYE

4
- (India) Arjun M. R.
- (India) R Shlok
11
11
11

- (Russia) R Alimov
- (Russia) P Kotsarenko
9
3
8

- (Russia) R Alimov
- (Russia) P Kotsarenko

BYE

4
- (India) Arjun M. R.
- (India) R Shlok
7
11
11
11

- (Japan) M Takano
- (Japan) Y Tsukamoto
11
9
8
9

- (Russia) R Kargaev
- (Russia) A Parakhodin

BYE

- (Russia) R Kargaev
- (Russia) A Parakhodin
5
2
4

- (Japan) M Takano
- (Japan) Y Tsukamoto
11
11
11

- (Japan) M Takano
- (Japan) Y Tsukamoto
11
11
14
13
11

- (France) B Kersaudy
- (France) J Maio
8
9
15
15
6

=== Bottom half ===
==== Section 3 ====
First round

Second round

Quarterfinals

- (Japan) K Oshima
- (Japan) Y Yamasaki
11
11
11

- (Russia) S Iakovlev
- (Russia) K Timofeev
2
6
3

- (Japan) K Oshima
- (Japan) Y Yamasaki
10
6
11

- (Russia) K Abramov
- (Russia) A Zinchenko
12
11
13

BYE

- (Russia) K Abramov
- (Russia) A Zinchenko

- (Russia) K Abramov
- (Russia) A Zinchenko
6
11
13
8
11

3
- (Russia) E Dremin
- (Russia) D Grachev
11
9
11
11
8

BYE

- (Russia) V Nikulov
- (Russia) A Serpionov

- (Russia) V Nikulov
- (Russia) A Serpionov
7
4
11
8

3
- (Russia) E Dremin
- (Russia) D Grachev
11
11
9
11

BYE

3
- (Russia) E Dremin
- (Russia) D Grachev

==== Section 4 ====
First round

Second round

Quarterfinals

BYE

- (Russia) A Kokarev
- (Russia) A Panov

- (Russia) A Kokarev
- (Russia) A Panov
2
2
0

- (Russia) V Durkin
- (Russia) V Malkov
11
11
11

BYE

- (Russia) V Durkin
- (Russia) V Malkov

- (Russia) V Durkin
- (Russia) V Malkov
6
11
8
6

2
- (Malaysia) Chooi K M
- (Malaysia) Low J S
11
6
11
11

BYE

- (Russia) A Kozyrev
- (Russia) A Vasilkin

- (Russia) A Kozyrev
- (Russia) A Vasilkin
3
5
6

2
- (Malaysia) Chooi K M
- (Malaysia) Low J S
11
11
11

BYE

2
- (Malaysia) Chooi K M
- (Malaysia) Low J S

== Women's doubles ==
=== Seeds ===
1. (Malaysia) Chow Mei Kuan / Lee Meng Yean (withdrew)
2. (Russia) Ekaterina Bolotova / Alina Davletova (semifinals)
3. (France) Delphine Delrue / Léa Palermo (second round)
4. (Russia) Olga Arkhangelskaya / Natalia Rogova (quarterfinals)

=== Finals ===
Semifinals

Final

- (Russia) Anastasiia Sharapova
- (Russia) Julia Zapolskaya
5
9
9

- (Japan) Yuho Imai
- (Japan) Minami Kawashima
11
11
11

- (Japan) Yuho Imai
- (Japan) Minami Kawashima
6
11
7
11
5

- (Japan) Akane Araki
- (Japan) Aoi Matsuda
11
6
11
7
11

- (Japan) Akane Araki
- (Japan) Aoi Matsuda
12
11
11

2
- (Russia) Ekaterina Bolotova
- (Russia) Alina Davletova
10
7
3

=== Top half ===
==== Section 1 ====
First round

Second round

Quarterfinals

1
- (Malaysia) Chow M K
- (Malaysia) Lee M Y

BYE

1
- (Malaysia) Chow M K
- (Malaysia) Lee M Y

- (Russia) V Chigintseva
- (Russia) M Dremina
w
/
o

- (Russia) V Chigintseva
- (Russia) M Dremina

BYE

- (Russia) V Chigintseva
- (Russia) M Dremina
2
6
0

- (Russia) A Sharapova
- (Russia) J Zapolskaya
11
11
11

- (Russia) E Khmelj
- (Russia) P Makkoveeva

BYE

- (Russia) E Khmelj
- (Russia) P Makkoveeva
8
9
11
8

- (Russia) A Sharapova
- (Russia) J Zapolskaya
11
11
9
11

- (Russia) A Sharapova
- (Russia) Y Vasilyeva
11
11
11

- (Russia) E Pyatina
- (Russia) J Zapolskaya
7
9
7

==== Section 2 ====
First round

Second round

Quarterfinals

4
- (Russia) O Arkhangelskaya
- (Russia) N Rogova

BYE

4
- (Russia) O Arkhangelskaya
- (Russia) N Rogova
11
11
8
11

- (Russia) T Bibik
- (Russia) N Perminova
6
5
11
8

- (Russia) T Bibik
- (Russia) N Perminova

BYE

4
- (Russia) O Arkhangelskaya
- (Russia) N Rogova
3
4
2

- (Japan) Y Imai
- (Japan) M Kawashima
11
11
11

- (Russia) E Dimova
- (Russia) N Vislova

BYE

- (Russia) E Dimova
- (Russia) N Vislova
6
11
14
7

- (Japan) Y Imai
- (Japan) M Kawashima
11
5
15
11

- (Japan) Y Imai
- (Japan) M Kawashima
11
11
11

- (Russia) M Malygina
- (Russia) A Romanko
5
3
5

=== Bottom half ===
==== Section 3 ====
First round

Second round

Quarterfinals

- (Japan) M Shigeta
- (Japan) H Yonemoto
11
11
11

- (Russia) O Ivashchenko
- (Russia) A Nazarchuk
2
5
5

- (Japan) M Shigeta
- (Japan) H Yonemoto
11
11
6
11

- (Russia) K Evgenova
- (Russia) E Kut
4
6
11
5

BYE

- (Russia) K Evgenova
- (Russia) E Kut

- (Japan) M Shigeta
- (Japan) H Yonemoto
6
4
7

- (Japan) A Araki
- (Japan) A Matsuda
11
11
11

- (Russia) E Kadochnikova
- (Russia) A Redkina
3
5
5

- (Japan) A Araki
- (Japan) A Matsuda
11
11
11

- (Japan) A Araki
- (Japan) A Matsuda
11
11
11

3
- (France) D Delrue
- (France) L Palermo
5
5
9

BYE

3
- (France) D Delrue
- (France) L Palermo

==== Section 4 ====
First round

Second round

Quarterfinals

- (Azerbaijan) Z Huseynova
- (Azerbaijan) A Mehdiyeva
4
6
5

- (Russia) A Semenova
- (Russia) K Vyrvich
11
11
11

- (Russia) A Semenova
- (Russia) K Vyrvich
11
11
11

- (Russia) A Korzhinskaia
- (Russia) E Nesterenko
6
2
3

BYE

- (Russia) A Korzhinskaia
- (Russia) E Nesterenko

- (Russia) A Semenova
- (Russia) K Vyrvich
4
6
7

2
- (Russia) E Bolotova
- (Russia) A Davletova
11
11
11

BYE

- (Russia) D Dzhedzhla
- (Russia) V Vorobeva

- (Russia) D Dzhedzhla
- (Russia) V Vorobeva
4
6
4

2
- (Russia) E Bolotova
- (Russia) A Davletova
11
11
11

BYE

2
- (Russia) E Bolotova
- (Russia) A Davletova

== Mixed doubles ==
=== Seeds ===
1. (Russia) Evgenij Dremin / Evgenia Dimova (quarterfinals)
2. (France) Bastian Kersaudy / Léa Palermo (second round)
3. (Russia) Rodion Alimov / Alina Davletova (second round)
4. (France) Thom Gicquel / Delphine Delrue (quarterfinals)

=== Finals ===
Semifinals

Final

- (Japan) Keiichiro Matsui
- (Japan) Akane Araki
9
11
11
11

- (Russia) Andrey Parakhodin
- (Russia) Natalia Rogova
11
3
9
5

- (Japan) Keiichiro Matsui
- (Japan) Akane Araki
8
11
3

- (Malaysia) Chan Peng Soon
- (Malaysia) Cheah Yee See
11
13
11

- (Russia) Vladimir Ivanov
- (Russia) Ekaterina Bolotova
15
9
9
9

- (Malaysia) Chan Peng Soon
- (Malaysia) Cheah Yee See
14
11
11
11

=== Top half ===
==== Section 1 ====
First round

Second round

Quarterfinals

1
- (Russia) E Dremin
- (Russia) E Dimova

BYE

1
- (Russia) E Dremin
- (Russia) E Dimova
8
13
11
11

- (Ukraine) A Pochtarov
- (Russia) O Arkhangelskaya
11
11
2
7

- (Russia) A Derbenev
- (Russia) V Chigintseva
3
1
2

- (Ukraine) A Pochtarov
- (Russia) O Arkhangelskaya
11
11
11

1
- (Russia) E Dremin
- (Russia) E Dimova
6
11
4
7

- (Japan) K Matsui
- (Japan) A Araki
11
6
11
11

- (Russia) A Khamidulin
- (Russia) M Malygina

BYE

- (Russia) A Khamidulin
- (Russia) M Malygina
4
2
3

- (Japan) K Matsui
- (Japan) A Araki
11
11
11

- (Russia) A Panov
- (Russia) P Makkoveeva
3
4
5

- (Japan) K Matsui
- (Japan) A Araki
11
11
11

==== Section 2 ====
First round

Second round

Quarterfinals

4
- (France) T Gicquel
- (France) D Delrue

BYE

4
- (France) T Gicquel
- (France) D Delrue
11
7
11
13

- (Russia) A Serpionov
- (Russia) V Vorobeva
2
11
2
11

- (Russia) A Serpionov
- (Russia) V Vorobeva
11
11
7
11

- (Azerbaijan) K Rzayev
- (Azerbaijan) A Mehdiyeva
2
2
11
7

4
- (France) T Gicquel
- (France) D Delrue
11
11
7
7
7

- (Russia) A Parakhodin
- (Russia) N Rogova
9
5
11
11
11

- (Russia) V Malkov
- (Russia) J Zapolskaya
8
11
11
11

- (Russia) Y Ismogilov
- (Russia) S Tsirulnikova
11
7
4
2

- (Russia) V Malkov
- (Russia) J Zapolskaya
8
9
7

- (Russia) A Parakhodin
- (Russia) N Rogova
11
11
11

- (Uzbekistan) A Savatyugin
- (Russia) O Ivashchenko
7
6
6

- (Russia) A Parakhodin
- (Russia) N Rogova
11
11
11

=== Bottom half ===
==== Section 3 ====
First round

Second round

Quarterfinals

- (Azerbaijan) O Galandarov
- (Azerbaijan) Z Huseynova
4
5
6

- (Russia) R Kargaev
- (Russia) K Vyrvich
11
11
11

- (Russia) R Kargaev
- (Russia) K Vyrvich
5
7
11
7

- (Russia) V Durkin
- (Russia) N Vislova
11
11
8
11

- (Russia) V Nikulov
- (Russia) E Kut
2
8
7

- (Russia) V Durkin
- (Russia) N Vislova
11
11
11

- (Russia) V Durkin
- (Russia) N Vislova
8
5
7

- (Russia) V Ivanov
- (Russia) E Bolotova
11
11
11

- (Russia) V Ivanov
- (Russia) E Bolotova
11
11
11

- (Japan) M Takano
- (Japan) A Matsuda
9
9
6

- (Russia) V Ivanov
- (Russia) E Bolotova
11
11
11

3
- (Russia) R Alimov
- (Russia) A Davletova
2
8
6

BYE

3
- (Russia) R Alimov
- (Russia) A Davletova

==== Section 4 ====
First round

Second round

Quarterfinals

- (India) S Sharma
- (India) A Parikh
11
11
11

- (Russia) A Butovetstkiy
- (Russia) A Nazarchuk
8
6
7

- (India) S Sharma
- (India) A Parikh
11
11
11

- (Russia) A Vasilkin
- (Russia) A Redkina
9
5
7

BYE

- (Russia) A Vasilkin
- (Russia) A Redkina

- (India) S Sharma
- (India) A Parikh
12
8
7
8

- (Malaysia) Chan P S
- (Malaysia) Cheah Y S
10
11
11
11

- (Malaysia) Chan P S
- (Malaysia) Cheah Y S
11
11
11

- (Russia) P Kotsarenko
- (Russia) T Bibik
7
7
9

- (Malaysia) Chan P S
- (Malaysia) Cheah Y S
10
14
11
13

2
- (France) B Kersaudy
- (France) L Palermo
12
12
6
11

BYE

2
- (France) B Kersaudy
- (France) L Palermo

Preceded by 2017 Canada Open Grand Prix	BWF Grand Prix Gold and Grand Prix; 2017 BWF Season	Succeeded by 2017 U.S. Open Grand Prix Gold
