= Yuho Imai =

Japanese badminton player (born 1995)

Yūho Imai
Personal information
- Born: 29 June 1995 (age 31) Nara Prefecture, Japan
- Height: 1.64 m (5 ft 5 in)
- Weight: 59 kg (130 lb)

Sport
- Country: Japan
- Sport: Badminton
- Handedness: Right

Women's & mixed doubles
- Highest ranking: 69 (XD with Akira Koga, 30 September 2025); 133 (WD with Minami Kawashima, 12 April 2018)
- BWF profile

Yuho Imai (今井 優歩, Imai Yūho; born 29 June 1995) is a Japanese female badminton player.

== Career ==
In her early career focusing on women's doubles, Imai won the 2016 Sydney International with Haruka Yonemoto and finished as the runner-up at the 2017 Russia Open Grand Prix with Minami Kawashima. Her career-high ranking in women's doubles was No. 133, achieved on 12 April 2018. After the 2019 Akita Masters, she did not compete internationally for several years.

She returned to competition in 2025, shifting her focus to mixed doubles with Akira Koga. They secured their first BWF World Tour title by winning the Kaohsiung Masters, a Super 100 level tournament. The pair defeated World University Games gold medalists Wu Hsuan-yi and Yang Chu-yun in the final. On the International Challenge/Series circuit, the pair won titles at the Mexican International and the Northern Marianas Open, and finished as runners-up at the Northern Marianas International. Her career-high ranking in mixed doubles with Koga is No. 69, achieved on 30 September 2025.

== Achievements ==
=== BWF World Tour (1 title) ===
The BWF World Tour, which was announced on 19 March 2017 and implemented in 2018, is a series of elite badminton tournaments sanctioned by the Badminton World Federation (BWF). The BWF World Tour is divided into levels of World Tour Finals, Super 1000, Super 750, Super 500, Super 300, and the BWF Tour Super 100.

Mixed doubles
| Year | Tournament | Level | Partner | Opponent | Score | Result | Ref. |
|---|---|---|---|---|---|---|---|
| 2025 | Kaohsiung Masters | Super 100 | (Japan) Akira Koga | (Chinese Taipei) Wu Hsuan-yi (Chinese Taipei) Yang Chu-yun | 16–21, 21–13, 21–15 | (gold) Winner | |

=== BWF Grand Prix ===
The BWF Grand Prix has two level such as Grand Prix Gold and Grand Prix. It is a series of badminton tournaments, sanctioned by Badminton World Federation (BWF) since 2007.

Women's Doubles
| Year | Tournament | Partner | Opponent | Score | Result | Ref. |
|---|---|---|---|---|---|---|
| 2017 | Russian Open | (Japan) Minami Kawashima | (Japan) Akane Araki (Japan) Aoi Matsuda | 6–11, 11–6, 7–11, 11–7, 5–11 | (silver) Runner-up | |

BWF Grand Prix tournament

=== BWF International Challenge/Series (3 titles, 1 runner-up) ===
Women's Doubles
| Year | Tournament | Partner | Opponent | Score | Result | Ref. |
|---|---|---|---|---|---|---|
| 2016 | Sydney International | (Japan) Haruka Yonemoto | (Japan) Erina Honda (Japan) Nozomi Shimizu | 21–16, 15–21, 21–18 | (gold) Winner | |

Mixed doubles
| Year | Tournament | Partner | Opponent | Score | Result | Ref. |
|---|---|---|---|---|---|---|
| 2025 | Mexican International | (Japan) Akira Koga | (Brazil) Davi Silva (Brazil) Sânia Lima | 15–8, 9–15, 15–9 | (gold) Winner | |
| 2025 | Northern Marianas International | (Japan) Akira Koga | (South Korea) Kim Jae-hyeon (South Korea) Kim Min-ji | 13–21, 21–16, 18–21 | (silver) Runner-up | |
| 2025 | Northern Marianas Open | (Japan) Akira Koga | (Japan) Haruki Kawabe (Japan) Kokona Ishikawa | 21–19, 21–13 | (gold) Winner | |

BWF International Challenge tournament
BWF International Series tournament
