= Akane Araki =

Japanese badminton player (born 1996)

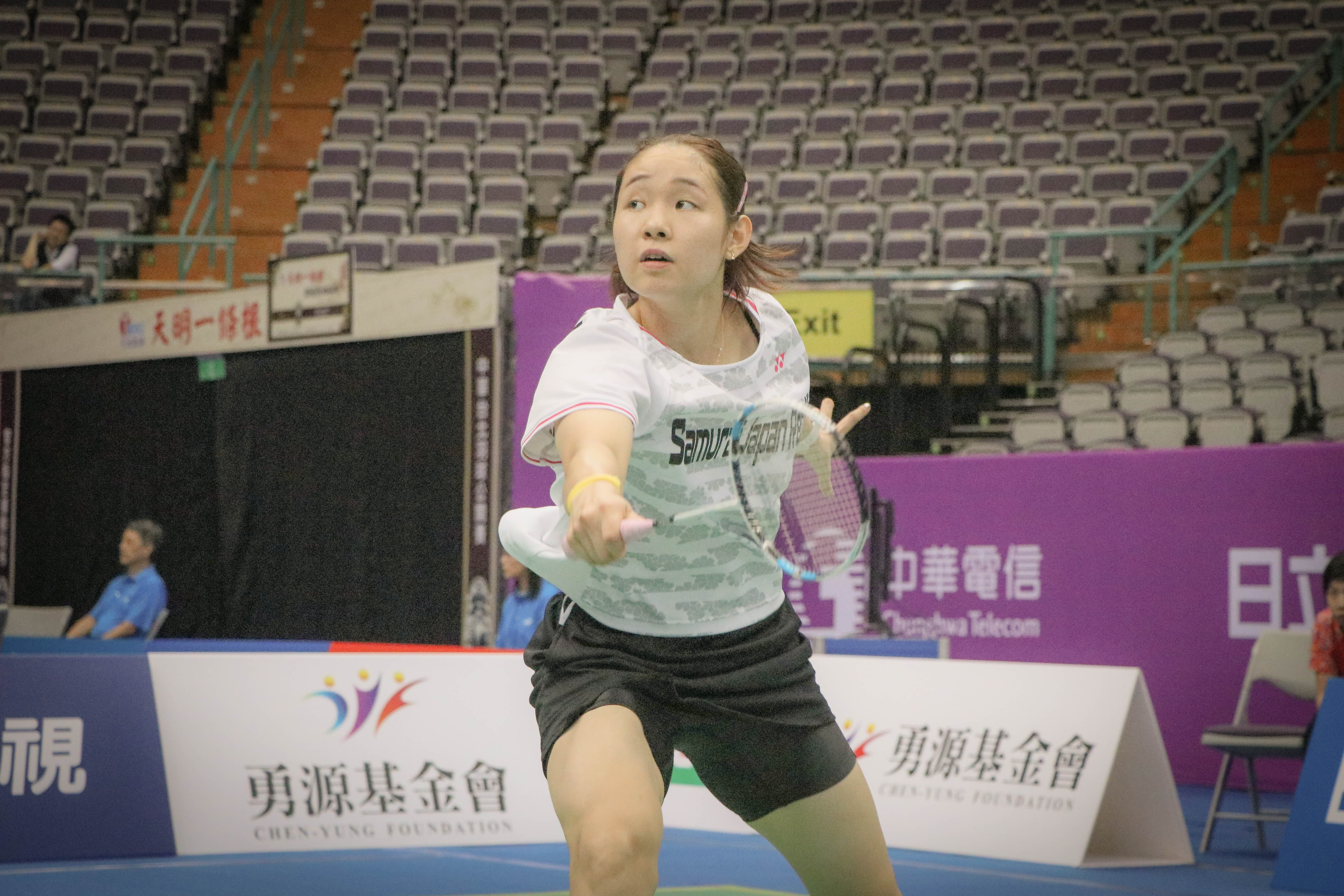
- Araki at the 2018 Chinese Taipei Open

Personal information
- Born: 21 October 1996 (age 30) Saitama Prefecture, Japan
- Height: 1.76 m (5 ft 9 in)
- Weight: 63 kg (139 lb)

Sport
- Country: Japan
- Sport: Badminton

Women's singles & doubles
- Highest ranking: 317 (WS 6 October 2016); 62 (WD with Aoi Matsuda 16 November 2017); 212 (XD with Keiichiro Matsui 5 July 2018)
- BWF profile
Medal record
Women's badminton
Representing Japan
World Junior Championships
Bronze medal – third place	2014 Alor Setar	Mixed team
Asian Junior Championships
Bronze medal – third place	2014 Taipei	Mixed team

Akane Araki (荒木 茜羽, Araki Akane; born 21 October 1996) is a Japanese badminton player who plays for The 77 Bank. She won her first international title at the Tahiti International tournament in the women's doubles event partnered with Ayaka Kawasaki. She and Kawasaki were the semi-finalists at the 2016 Belgian International tournament.

== Personal life ==
Her mother, Wu Jianqiu is a former member of the China national badminton team.

== Achievements ==
=== BWF Grand Prix ===
The BWF Grand Prix had two levels, the Grand Prix and Grand Prix Gold. It was a series of badminton tournaments sanctioned by the Badminton World Federation (BWF) and played between 2007 and 2017.

Women's doubles
Year	Tournament	Partner	Opponent	Score	Result	Ref.
2017	Russian Open	(Japan) Aoi Matsuda	(Japan) Yuho Imai (Japan) Minami Kawashima	11–6, 6–11, 11–7, 7–11, 11–5	(gold) Winner	
2017	Bitburger Open	(Japan) Aoi Matsuda	(Thailand) Jongkolphan Kititharakul (Thailand) Rawinda Prajongjai	19–21, 6–21	(silver) Runner-up	

Mixed doubles
Year	Tournament	Partner	Opponent	Score	Result	Ref.
2017	Russian Open	(Japan) Keiichiro Matsui	(Malaysia) Chan Peng Soon (Malaysia) Cheah Yee See	8–11, 11–13, 3–11	(silver) Runner-up	

BWF Grand Prix Gold tournament
BWF Grand Prix tournament

=== BWF International Challenge/Series ===
Women doubles
Year	Tournament	Partner	Opponent	Score	Result	Ref.
2016	Tahiti International	(Japan) Ayaka Kawasaki	(United States) Eva Lee (United States) Paula Lynn Obañana	21–13, 21–12	(gold) Winner	
2018	White Nights	(Japan) Riko Imai	(Japan) Asumi Kugo (Japan) Megumi Yokoyama	21–18, 21–12	(gold) Winner	
2018	Yonex / K&D Graphics International	(Japan) Riko Imai	(United States) Annie Xu (United States) Kerry Xu	21–15, 21–19	(gold) Winner	

BWF International Challenge tournament
BWF International Series tournament
BWF Future Series tournament
