= South Australia International =

International badminton tournament

The South Australia International in badminton, is an international open held in Adelaide, South Australia, Australia. The tournament sanctioned by the Badminton World Federation and part of the Badminton Oceania circuit.

== Previous winners ==
Year	Men's singles	Women's singles	Men's doubles	Women's doubles	Mixed doubles	Ref
1995	(Australia) Paul Stevenson	(Australia) Lisa Campbell	(Australia) Peter Blackburn (Australia) Paul Staight	(Australia) Rhonda Cator (Australia) Amanda Hardy	(Australia) Paul Stevenson (Australia) Amanda Hardy	
1996	(Australia) Chris Thirlwell	(Australia) Rayoni Head	(Australia) David Draper (Australia) Meng Ling	(Australia) Jenny Gibson (Australia) Lynda Graves	(Australia) David Draper (Australia) Jenny Gibson	
1997	No competition					
1998	(New Zealand) Nick Hall	(New Zealand) Amanda Carter	(Australia) Murray Hocking (Australia) Mark Nichols	(Australia) Rhonda Cator (Australia) Amanda Hardy	(Australia) Peter Blackburn (Australia) Rhonda Cator	
1999– 2017	No competition					
2018	(Japan) Yu Igarashi	(Japan) Natsuki Oie	(Japan) Akira Koga (Japan) Taichi Saito	(Japan) Erina Honda (Japan) Nozomi Shimizu	(Singapore) Terry Hee (Singapore) Citra Putri Sari Dewi	
2019	(Malaysia) Ng Tze Yong	(Japan) Natsuki Nidaira	(South Korea) Kim Duk-young (South Korea) Kim Sa-rang	(Japan) Rin Iwanaga (Japan) Kie Nakanishi	(Canada) Joshua Hurlburt-Yu (Canada) Josephine Wu	
2020– 2025	No competition					
2026	(Australia) Karono	(South Korea) Kim Do-yeon	(South Korea) Cheon Ji-min (South Korea) Park Seung-min	(South Korea) Kim So-hee (South Korea) Yeon Seo-yeon	(South Korea) Park Seung-min (South Korea) Yeon Seo-yeon	

== Performances by nation ==
As of the 2026 edition

Top Nations
Pos	Nation	MS	WS	MD	WD	XD	Total
1	Australia*	3	2	3	3	3	14
2	Japan	1	2	1	2	0	6
3	South Korea	0	1	1	1	1	4
4	New Zealand	1	1	0	0	0	2
5	Canada	0	0	0	0	1	1
5	Malaysia	1	0	0	0	0	1
5	Singapore	0	0	0	0	1	1
5	South Korea	0	0	1	0	0	1
Total		6	6	6	6	6	30

* Host nation
