= Keiichiro Matsui =

Japanese badminton player (born 1994)

Kei'ichirō Matsui
Personal information
- Native name: 松居 圭一郎
- Born: 5 June 1994 (age 32) Kahoku, Ishikawa, Japan
- Height: 1.69 m (5 ft 7 in)
- Weight: 64 kg (141 lb)

Sport
- Country: Japan
- Sport: Badminton
- Handedness: Right

Men's & mixed doubles
- Highest ranking: 26 (MD with Yoshinori Takeuchi, 19 September 2023); 212 (XD with Akane Araki, 5 July 2018)
- Current ranking: 133 (MD with Kenya Mitsuhashi, 3 November 2026)
- BWF profile
Medal record
Men's badminton
Representing Japan
Thomas Cup
Bronze medal – third place	2022 Bangkok	Men's team
World Junior Championships
Silver medal – second place	2012 Chiba	Mixed team
Asian Junior Championships
Gold medal – first place	2012 Gimcheon	Mixed team

Keiichiro Matsui (松居 圭一郎, Matsui Kei'ichirō; born 5 June 1994) is a Japanese badminton player. He is a former member of the Japanese national team. Previously affiliated with the Hitachi team, Matsui officially joined the AC Nagano Parceiro Badminton Club in March 2026. Born in Ishikawa, he graduated from the Tomioka senior high school, and later educated at the Nippon Sport Science University. He was part of the national junior team that won the gold medal at the 2012 Asian Junior Championships, and the silver medal at the 2012 World Junior Championships.

== Career ==
=== 2026 ===
Matsui formed a new men's doubles partnership with Kenya Mitsuhashi. In June, they made their debut at the U.S. Open, where they reached the quarterfinals.

== Achievements ==
=== BWF World Tour (1 runner-up) ===
The BWF World Tour, which was announced on 19 March 2017 and implemented in 2018, is a series of elite badminton tournaments sanctioned by the Badminton World Federation (BWF). The BWF World Tour is divided into levels of World Tour Finals, Super 1000, Super 750, Super 500, Super 300 (part of the HSBC World Tour), and the BWF Tour Super 100.

Men's doubles
Year	Tournament	Level	Partner	Opponent	Score	Result	Ref.
2019	Russian Open	Super 100	(Japan) Yoshinori Takeuchi	(Denmark) Mathias Boe (Denmark) Mads Conrad-Petersen	18–21, 13–21	(silver) Runner-up	

=== BWF Grand Prix (1 runner-up) ===
The BWF Grand Prix had two levels, the Grand Prix and Grand Prix Gold. It was a series of badminton tournaments sanctioned by the Badminton World Federation (BWF) and played between 2007 and 2017.

Mixed doubles
Year	Tournament	Partner	Opponent	Score	Result	Ref.
2017	Russian Open	(Japan) Akane Araki	(Malaysia) Chan Peng Soon (Malaysia) Cheah Yee See	8–11, 13–11, 3–11	(silver) Runner-up	

BWF Grand Prix tournament

=== BWF International Challenge/Series (3 titles, 1 runner-up) ===
Men's doubles
Year	Tournament	Partner	Opponent	Score	Result	Ref.
2017	Spanish International	(Japan) Yoshinori Takeuchi	(Netherlands) Jacco Arends (Netherlands) Ruben Jille	17–21, 19–21	(silver) Runner-up	
2019	Maldives International	(Japan) Yoshinori Takeuchi	(India) Arun George (India) Sanyam Shukla	21–9, 22–20	(gold) Winner	
2019	Dubai International	(Japan) Yoshinori Takeuchi	(Malaysia) Shia Chun Kang (Malaysia) Tan Boon Heong	21–14, 21–14	(gold) Winner	
2025	Malaysia International	(Japan) Katsuki Tamate	(Malaysia) Muhammad Faiq (Malaysia) Lok Hong Quan	15–7, 15–13	(gold) Winner	

BWF International Challenge tournament
