= Hoo Pang Ron =

Malaysian badminton player (born 1998)

Hoo Pang Ron 许邦荣
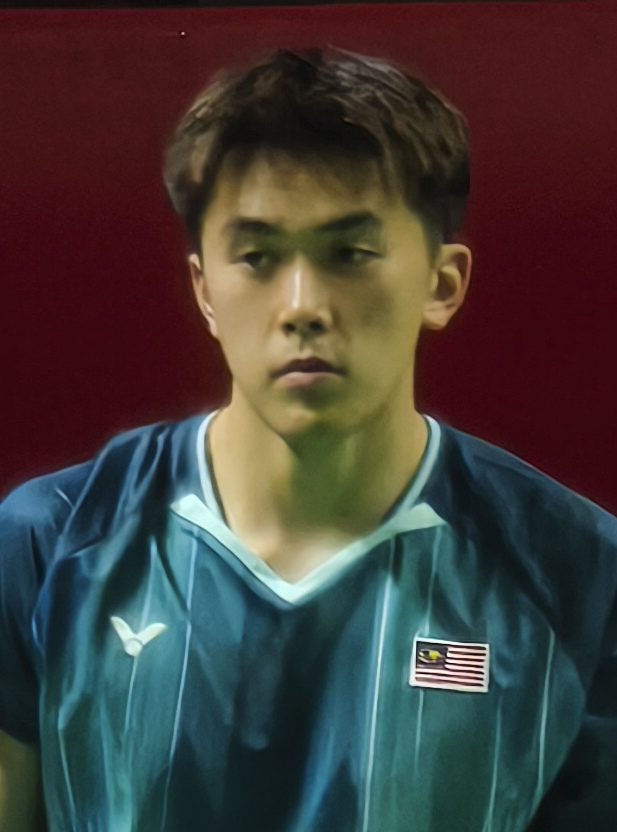
- Hoo at the 2026 Indonesia Open

Personal information
- Born: 29 March 1998 (age 28) Kuala Lumpur, Malaysia
- Height: 1.78 m (5 ft 10 in)

Sport
- Country: Malaysia
- Sport: Badminton
- Handedness: Right

Mixed doubles
- Highest ranking: 13 (with Cheng Su Yin, 11 March 2025)
- Current ranking: 14 (with Lai Pei Jing, 10 November 2026)
- BWF profile
Medal record
Men's badminton
Representing Malaysia
Sudirman Cup
Bronze medal – third place	2021 Vantaa	Mixed team
Bronze medal – third place	2023 Suzhou	Mixed team
SEA Games
Silver medal – second place	2021 Vietnam	Men's team
Silver medal – second place	2021 Vietnam	Mixed doubles
Silver medal – second place	2025 Thailand	Men's team
World Junior Championships
Silver medal – second place	2016 Bilbao	Mixed team

Hoo Pang Ron
- Traditional Chinese: 許邦榮
- Simplified Chinese: 许邦荣
Transcriptions
Standard Mandarin
- Hanyu Pinyin: Xǔ Bāngróng
Southern Min
- Hokkien POJ: Khó͘ Pang-êng

Hoo Pang Ron (simplified Chinese: 许邦荣; traditional Chinese: 許邦榮; pinyin: Xǔ Bāngróng, born 29 March 1998) is a Malaysian badminton player. A two-time Sudirman Cup bronze medalist and a double silver medalist at the 2021 SEA Games, he was part of Malaysia's mixed teams that won bronze medals at the 2021 and 2023 Sudirman Cups. He also won a silver medal in mixed doubles at the 2021 SEA Games alongside Cheah Yee See and was a member of Malaysia's silver medal-winning men's team at the same competition.

At the senior international level, Hoo won his first BWF World Tour title at the 2019 Hyderabad Open with Cheah Yee See. He subsequently partnered Cheng Su Yin and reached the final of the 2024 China Masters, a BWF World Tour Super 750 tournament, where they finished runners-up to China's Feng Yanzhe and Huang Dongping. Hoo and Cheng achieved a career-high mixed doubles world ranking of number 13 on 11 March 2025.

In 2026, Hoo formed a new partnership with Lai Pei Jing and reached another China Masters final, finishing runners-up to Feng Yanzhe and Huang Dongping for the second time, this time at the 2026 China Masters. The result was the pair's first BWF World Tour final since joining forces earlier that year. Hoo also won a men's team silver medal at the 2025 SEA Games and was part of Malaysia's mixed team that finished runners-up at the 2016 BWF World Junior Championships. He is the younger brother of Malaysian badminton player Vivian Hoo.

== Personal life ==
Hoo is the younger brother of Vivian Hoo, a professional badminton player.

== Achievements ==
=== SEA Games ===
Mixed doubles
Year	Venue	Partner	Opponent	Score	Result
2021	Bac Giang Gymnasium; Bắc Giang, Vietnam	(Malaysia) Cheah Yee See	(Malaysia) Chen Tang Jie (Malaysia) Peck Yen Wei	21–15, 19–21, 13–21	Silver

=== BWF World Tour (1 title, 3 runners-up) ===
The BWF World Tour, which was announced on 19 March 2017 and implemented in 2018, is a series of elite badminton tournaments sanctioned by the Badminton World Federation (BWF). The BWF World Tour is divided into levels of World Tour Finals, Super 1000, Super 750, Super 500, Super 300 (part of the HSBC World Tour), and the BWF Tour Super 100.

Mixed doubles
Year	Tournament	Level	Partner	Opponent	Score	Result	Ref.
2019	Hyderabad Open	Super 100	(Malaysia) Cheah Yee See	(Indonesia) Adnan Maulana (Indonesia) Mychelle Crhystine Bandaso	16–21, 21–16, 21–11	(gold) Winner	
2024	China Masters	Super 750	(Malaysia) Cheng Su Yin	(China) Feng Yanzhe (China) Huang Dongping	23–21, 23–25, 16–21	(silver) Runner-up	
2026	China Masters	Super 750	(Malaysia) Lai Pei Jing	(China) Feng Yanzhe (China) Huang Dongping	19–21, 16–21	(silver) Runner-up	
2026	French Open	Super 750	(Malaysia) Lai Pei Jing	(China) Feng Yanzhe (China) Huang Dongping	10–21, 13–21	(silver) Runner-up	

=== BWF International Challenge/Series (5 titles, 2 runners-up) ===
Mixed doubles
Year	Tournament	Partner	Opponent	Score	Result
2018	Bangladesh International	(Malaysia) Cheah Yee See	(Indonesia) Leo Rolly Carnando (Indonesia) Indah Cahya Sari Jamil	16–21, 15–21	(silver) Runner-up
2019	India International	(Malaysia) Cheah Yee See	(Malaysia) Chia Wei Jie (Malaysia) Pearly Tan	21–15, 21–15	(gold) Winner
2019	Bangladesh International	(Malaysia) Cheah Yee See	(Malaysia) Choong Hon Jian (Malaysia) Payee Lim Peiy Yee	21–8, 21–19	(gold) Winner
2022	Malaysia International	(Malaysia) Teoh Mei Xing	(Malaysia) Chen Tang Jie (Malaysia) Toh Ee Wei	18–21, 21–15, 21–19	(gold) Winner
2023	Iran Fajr International	(Malaysia) Teoh Mei Xing	(Malaysia) Chen Tang Jie (Malaysia) Toh Ee Wei	19–21, 15–21	(silver) Runner-up
2023	Maldives International	(Malaysia) Teoh Mei Xing	(United States) Vinson Chiu (United States) Jennie Gai	21–13, 21–18	(gold) Winner
2023	Malaysia International	(Malaysia) Cheng Su Yin	(Chinese Taipei) Lin Yu-chieh (Chinese Taipei) Hsu Yin-hui	21–17, 21–19	(gold) Winner

BWF International Challenge tournament
BWF International Series tournament
