= Cheah Yee See =

Malaysian former badminton player (born 1995)

Cheah Yee See 谢宜茜
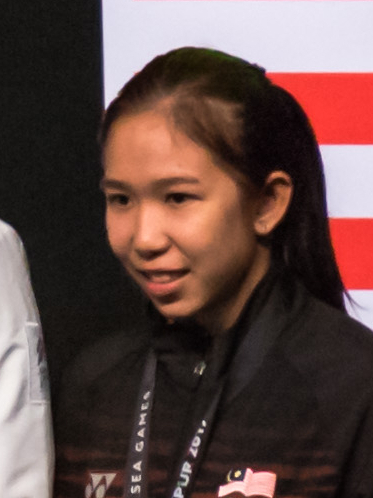

Personal information
- Born: 谢宜希; 18 November 1995 (age 30) Butterworth, Penang, Malaysia
- Height: 1.65 m (5 ft 5 in)

Sport
- Country: Malaysia
- Sport: Badminton
- Handedness: Right
- Retired: 22 May 2024

Women's & mixed doubles
- Highest ranking: 49 (WD with Chin Kah Mun 15 September 2016); 17 (XD with Chan Peng Soon 12 April 2018)
- BWF profile
Medal record
Women's badminton
Representing Malaysia
Sudirman Cup
Bronze medal – third place	2021 Vantaa	Mixed team
Commonwealth Games
Gold medal – first place	2022 Birmingham	Mixed team
SEA Games
Silver medal – second place	2017 Kuala Lumpur	Women's team
Silver medal – second place	2021 Vietnam	Mixed doubles
Bronze medal – third place	2017 Kuala Lumpur	Mixed doubles
Bronze medal – third place	2021 Vietnam	Women's doubles
Asian Junior Championships
Silver medal – second place	2011 Lucknow	Mixed team

Cheah Yee See (Chinese: 謝宜茜; pinyin: Xiè Yíxī; Pe̍h-ōe-jī: Chiā Gî-chhi; born 18 November 1995) is a Malaysian former badminton player. Along with Hoo Pang Ron, she was one of the players that earned the Malaysian team a bronze medal at the 2021 Sudirman Cup.

== Achievements ==
=== SEA Games ===
Women's doubles
Year	Venue	Partner	Opponent	Score	Result
2021	Bac Giang Gymnasium; Bắc Giang, Vietnam	(Malaysia) Cheng Su Hui	(Thailand) Benyapa Aimsaard (Thailand) Nuntakarn Aimsaard	16–21, 6–21	Bronze

Mixed doubles
Year	Venue	Partner	Opponent	Score	Result
2017	Axiata Arena; Kuala Lumpur, Malaysia	(Malaysia) Chan Peng Soon	(Thailand) Dechapol Puavaranukroh (Thailand) Sapsiree Taerattanachai	16–21, 21–18, 21–23	Bronze
2021	Bac Giang Gymnasium; Bắc Giang, Vietnam	(Malaysia) Hoo Pang Ron	(Malaysia) Chen Tang Jie (Malaysia) Peck Yen Wei	21–15, 19–21, 13–21	Silver

=== BWF World Tour (2 titles) ===
The BWF World Tour, which was announced on 19 March 2017 and implemented in 2018, is a series of elite badminton tournaments sanctioned by the Badminton World Federation (BWF). The BWF World Tours are divided into levels of World Tour Finals, Super 1000, Super 750, Super 500, Super 300 (part of the HSBC World Tour), and the BWF Tour Super 100.

Mixed doubles
Year	Tournament	Level	Partner	Opponent	Score	Result
2019	Hyderabad Open	Super 100	(Malaysia) Hoo Pang Ron	(Indonesia) Adnan Maulana (Indonesia) Mychelle Crhystine Bandaso	16–21, 21–16, 21–11	(gold) Winner
2023	Malaysia Super 100	Super 100	(Malaysia) Chan Peng Soon	(Thailand) Pakkapon Teeraratsakul (Thailand) Phataimas Muenwong	21–9, 17–21, 21–10	(gold) Winner

=== BWF Grand Prix (1 title) ===
The BWF Grand Prix had two levels, the Grand Prix and Grand Prix Gold. It was a series of badminton tournaments sanctioned by the Badminton World Federation (BWF) and played between 2007 and 2017.

Mixed doubles
Year	Tournament	Partner	Opponent	Score	Result
2017	Russian Open	(Malaysia) Chan Peng Soon	(Japan) Keiichiro Matsui (Japan) Akane Araki	11–8, 11–13, 11–3	(gold) Winner

BWF Grand Prix Gold tournament
BWF Grand Prix tournament

=== BWF International Challenge/Series (4 titles, 2 runners-up) ===
Women's doubles
Year	Tournament	Partner	Opponent	Score	Result
2014	Hungarian International	(Malaysia) Goh Yea Ching	(Denmark) Josephine van Zaane (Sweden) Emma Wengberg	11–4, 11–10, 11–10	(gold) Winner
2015	Hungarian International	(Malaysia) Chin Kah Mun	(Denmark) Alexandra Bøje (Denmark) Gabriella Bøje	21–14, 22–20	(gold) Winner

Mixed doubles
Year	Tournament	Partner	Opponent	Score	Result
2016	India International Series	(Malaysia) Low Hang Yee	(India) Satwiksairaj Rankireddy (India) K. Maneesha	11–5, 8–11, 10–12, 8–11	(silver) Runner-up
2018	Bangladesh International	(Malaysia) Hoo Pang Ron	(Indonesia) Leo Rolly Carnando (Indonesia) Indah Cahya Sari Jamil	16–21, 15–21	(silver) Runner-up
2019	India International	(Malaysia) Hoo Pang Ron	(Malaysia) Chia Wei Jie (Malaysia) Pearly Tan	21–15, 21–15	(gold) Winner
2019	Bangladesh International	(Malaysia) Hoo Pang Ron	(Malaysia) Choong Hon Jian (Malaysia) Payee Lim Peiy Yee	21–8, 21–19	(gold) Winner

BWF International Challenge tournament
BWF International Series tournament
