= Aoi Matsuda =

Japanese badminton player (born 1996)

Personal information
- Born: 26 February 1996 (age 30) Osaka Prefecture, Japan
- Height: 1.58 m (5 ft 2 in)
- Weight: 50 kg (110 lb)

Sport
- Country: Japan
- Sport: Badminton
- Handedness: Right
- Retired: 15 May 2022

Women's doubles
- Highest ranking: 44 (WD with Chisato Hoshi 9 November 2021)
- BWF profile
Medal record
Women's badminton
Representing Japan
Asian Junior Championships
Bronze medal – third place	2013 Kota Kinabalu	Mixed team

Aoi Matsuda (松田 蒼, Matsuda Aoi; born 26 February 1996) is a retired Japanese badminton player who competed primarily in women's doubles. She achieved a career-high ranking of world No. 44 in women's doubles on 9 November 2021. Matsuda won the 2021 Hylo Open, a Super 500 tournament and her first BWF World Tour title, partnering with Chisato Hoshi. Her other titles include the 2019 Polish Open with Hoshi and the 2017 Russian Open with Akane Araki. Matsuda officially retired from professional badminton on 15 May 2022.

== Early life and career ==
Born on 26 February 1996, in Osaka Prefecture, Japan, Aoi Matsuda began playing badminton in her first year of elementary school at the Uryūwari-nishi SSC club. She later moved to Toyama Prefecture to attend Wago Junior High School and graduated from the Toyama University of International Studies High School, a region recognized for its strong badminton programs.

Matsuda's junior career included several achievements at international and national levels. In 2013, she earned a bronze medal as part of the Japanese team at the Asian Junior Championships. Partnering with Arisa Higashino, she reached the quarterfinals in girls' doubles at both the Asian Junior Championships and the World Junior Championships. Domestically, she was the runner-up in girls' doubles at the 2012 Inter-High School Championships. The following year, she won the girls' doubles title at the All Japan High School Invitational Badminton Championships.

== Career ==
After graduating from high school, Aoi Matsuda joined the Gifu Tricky Panders team. With teammate Akane Araki, she won the BWF Grand Prix title at the 2017 Russian Open and was a finalist at the Bitburger Open the same year. On 1 April 2018, she signed a professional contract with Wilson and competed as a player for Amer Sports Japan.

In March 2019, Matsuda joined Nihon Unisys team (later renamed BIPROGY) and started a new partnership with Chisato Hoshi in women's doubles. The pair were members of the Japanese B national team from 2019 until 2022. They won the 2019 Polish Open in March, the same month their partnership was formed. In 2021, Matsuda and Hoshi achieved their first Super 500 title at the Hylo Open, which also marked Matsuda's inaugural BWF World Tour title. They defeated the top-seeded Thai pair, Jongkolphan Kititharakul and Rawinda Prajongjai, in the semifinals before winning the final against fellow Japanese players Rin Iwanaga and Kie Nakanishi. This victory led to their highest career ranking of world No. 44 on 9 November 2021. Domestically, the pair also secured the Japan Ranking Circuit Tournament title in both 2019 and 2021.

Matsuda's final professional appearance was the 2021 BWF World Championships in December, which was also her world championships debut. On 16 May 2022, her retirement was officially announced by her team, BIPROGY, effective 15 May 2022.

== Personal life ==
In October 2022, it was announced that Matsuda had married fellow badminton player Yunosuke Kubota, a former World Junior Champion.

== Achievements ==
=== BWF World Tour (1 title) ===
The BWF World Tour, which was announced on 19 March 2017 and implemented in 2018, is a series of elite badminton tournaments sanctioned by the Badminton World Federation (BWF). The BWF World Tours are divided into levels of World Tour Finals, Super 1000, Super 750, Super 500, Super 300 (part of the HSBC World Tour), and the BWF Tour Super 100.

Women's doubles
Year	Tournament	Level	Partner	Opponent	Score	Result	Ref.
2021	Hylo Open	Super 500	(Japan) Chisato Hoshi	(Japan) Rin Iwanaga (Japan) Kie Nakanishi	22–20, 21–18	(gold) Winner	

=== BWF Grand Prix (1 title, 1 runner-up) ===
The BWF Grand Prix had two levels, the Grand Prix and Grand Prix Gold. It was a series of badminton tournaments sanctioned by the Badminton World Federation (BWF) and played between 2007 and 2017.

Women's doubles
Year	Tournament	Partner	Opponent	Score	Result	Ref.
2017	Russian Open	(Japan) Akane Araki	(Japan) Yuho Imai (Japan) Minami Kawashima	11–6, 6–11, 11–7, 7–11, 11–5	(gold) Winner	
2017	Bitburger Open	(Japan) Akane Araki	(Thailand) Jongkolphan Kititharakul (Thailand) Rawinda Prajongjai	19–21, 6–21	(silver) Runner-up	

BWF Grand Prix Gold tournament
BWF Grand Prix tournament

=== BWF International Challenge/Series (1 title) ===
Women's doubles
Year	Tournament	Partner	Opponent	Score	Result	Ref.
2019	Polish Open	(Japan) Chisato Hoshi	(Denmark) Alexandra Bøje (Denmark) Mette Poulsen	21–18, 15–21, 21–17	(gold) Winner	

BWF International Challenge tournament
