= Israeli National Badminton Championships =

The Israeli National Badminton Championships is a tournament organized to crown the best badminton players in Israel. They have been held since 1977.

== Past winners ==
| Year | Men's singles | Women's singles | Men's doubles | Women's doubles | Mixed doubles |
|---|---|---|---|---|---|
| 1977 | Victor Yusim | Chaya Grunstein | Victor Yusim; Michael Schneidman | Vivian Meirowitz; Carol Silman | Michael Schneidman; Dianne Levi |
| 1978 | Nissim Duk | Chaya Grunstein | Victor Yusim; Michael Schneidman | Carol Silman; Prina Ben Shushan | Michael Rappaport; Gila Rappaport |
| 1979 | Yitzhak Serrouya | Eva Unglick | Victor Yusim; Michael Schneidman | no competition | Michael Rappaport; Eva Unglick |
| 1980 | Yitzhak Serrouya | Eva Unglick | Nissim Duk; Yitzhak Serrouya | Eva Unglick; Irit Ben Shushan | Michael Rappaport; Eva Unglick |
| 1981 | Nissim Duk | Eva Unglick | Victor Yusim; Michael Rappaport | Eva Unglick; Irit Ben Shushan | Michael Rappaport; Eva Unglick |
| 1982 | Nissim Duk | Aliza Moses | Nissim Duk; Yitzhak Serrouya | Aliza Moses; Bruria Serrouya | Yitzhak Serrouya; Aliza Moses |
| 1983 | Nissim Duk | Aliza Moses | Nissim Duk; Yitzhak Serrouya | Aliza Moses; Bruria Serrouya | Yitzhak Serrouya; Aliza Moses |
| 1984 | Nissim Duk | Irit Ben-Shushan | Nissim Duk; Reuven Moses | Aliza Moses; Bruria Serrouya | Reuven Moses; Irit Ben Shushan |
| 1985 | Reuven Moses | Bruria Serrouya | Reuven Moses; Victor Yusim | no competition | Reuven Moses; Aliza Moses |
| 1986 | Reuven Moses | Bruria Serrouya | Reuven Moses; Amir Moses | no competition | no competition |
| 1987 | Amir Moses | Sigalit Moses | Reuven Moses; Amir Moses | no competition | Amir Moses; Sigalit Moses |
| 1988 | Reuven Moses | Shirley Daniel | Reuven Moses; Amir Moses | no competition | Reuven Moses; Aliza Moses |
| 1989 | Amir Moses | Shirley Daniel | Reuven Moses; Amir Moses | no competition | Reuven Moses; Bruria Serrouya |
| 1990 | Reuven Moses | Natalia Sverdlin | Reuven Moses; Amir Moses | no competition | Reuven Moses; Natalia Sverdlin |
| 1991 | Reuven Moses | Svetlana Zilberman | Reuven Moses; Amir Moses | Svetlana Zilberman; Maybar Ben Ari | Leonid Paikin; Svetlana Zilberman |
| 1992 | Amir Moses | Svetlana Zilberman | Reuven Moses; Amir Moses | Svetlana Zilberman; Sigalit Moses | Reuven Moses; Svetlana Zilberman |
| 1993 | Amir Moses | Sigalit Moses | Reuven Moses; Amir Moses | Sigalit Moses; Anat Ladsky | Leonid Paikin; Natalia Sverdlin |
| 1994 | Amir Moses | Svetlana Zilberman | Reuven Moses; Amir Moses | Svetlana Zilberman; Esther Koifman | Reuven Moses; Svetlana Zilberman |
| 1995 | Leon Pugatch | Svetlana Zilberman | Reuven Moses; Amir Moses | Svetlana Zilberman; Sigalit Moses | Reuven Moses; Svetlana Zilberman |
| 1996 | Leon Pugatch | Svetlana Zilberman | Leon Pugatch; Meni Gershon | Svetlana Zilberman; Esther Koifman | Reuven Moses; Svetlana Zilberman |
| 1997 | Leon Pugatch | Svetlana Zilberman | Leon Pugatch; Eli Raymond | Svetlana Zilberman; Shirley Daniel | Leon Pugatch; Svetlana Zilberman |
| 1998 | Paz Ben-Sira | Svetlana Zilberman | Leon Pugatch; Eli Raymond | Svetlana Zilberman; Shirley Daniel | Leon Pugatch; Svetlana Zilberman |
| 1999 | Leon Pugatch | Svetlana Zilberman | Leon Pugatch; Eli Raymond | Svetlana Zilberman; Shirley Daniel | Leon Pugatch; Svetlana Zilberman |
| 2000 | Leon Pugatch | Svetlana Zilberman | Nir Yusim; Boris Kroiter | Svetlana Zilberman; Shirley Daniel | Leon Pugatch; Svetlana Zilberman |
| 2001 | Nir Yusim | Svetlana Zilberman | Nir Yusim; Boris Kroiter | Svetlana Zilberman; Svetlana Kaplian | Leon Pugatch; Svetlana Zilberman |
| 2002 | Shai Geffen | Svetlana Zilberman | Leon Pugatch; Dani Schneidman | Svetlana Zilberman; Svetlana Kaplian | Sergey Antonyuk; Svetlana Zilberman |
| 2003 | Shai Geffen | Svetlana Zilberman | Nir Yusim; Boris Kroiter | Svetlana Zilberman; Svetlana Kaplian | Sergey Antonyuk; Svetlana Zilberman |
| 2004 | Nir Yusim | Svetlana Zilberman | Reuven Moses; Amir Moses | Svetlana Zilberman; Svetlana Kaplian | Sergey Antonyuk; Svetlana Zilberman |
| 2005 | Shai Geffen | Svetlana Zilberman | Nir Yusim; Boris Kroiter | Svetlana Zilberman; Svetlana Kaplian | Misha Zilberman; Svetlana Zilberman |
| 2006 | Misha Zilberman | Svetlana Zilberman | Nir Yusim; Alex Bass | Svetlana Zilberman; Svetlana Kaplian | Misha Zilberman; Svetlana Zilberman |
| 2007 | Nir Yusim | Svetlana Zilberman | Nir Yusim; Alex Bass | Svetlana Zilberman; Svetlana Kaplian | Misha Zilberman; Svetlana Zilberman |
| 2008 | Alex Bass | Svetlana Zilberman | Nir Yusim; Lior Kroyter | Svetlana Zilberman; Svetlana Kopelyan | Misha Zilberman; Svetlana Zilberman |
| 2009 | Misha Zilberman | Alina Pugach | Nir Yusim; Lior Kroyter | Alina Pugach; Rina Fridman | Misha Zilberman; Svetlana Zilberman |
| 2010 | Misha Zilberman | Alina Pugach | Nir Yusim; Alex Bass | Alina Pugach; Rotem Romano | Misha Zilberman; Svetlana Zilberman |
| 2011 | Misha Zilberman | Alina Pugach | Nir Yusim; Alex Bass | Alina Pugach; Rotem Romano | Misha Zilberman; Svetlana Zilberman |
| 2012 | Misha Zilberman | Alina Pugach | Ziv Nadil; Itay Elazar | Alina Pugach; Rotem Romano | Misha Zilberman; Svetlana Zilberman |
| 2013 | Misha Zilberman | Yana Molodezki | | | Misha Zilberman; Svetlana Zilberman |
| 2014 | Misha Zilberman | Alina Pugach | Alex Bass; Lior Kroyter | Yana Molodezki; Dana Kugel | Misha Zilberman; Svetlana Zilberman |
| 2015 | Misha Zilberman | Dana Kugel | Alex Bass; Lior Kroyter | Yana Molodezki; Dana Kugel | Misha Zilberman; Svetlana Zilberman |
| 2016 | Misha Zilberman | Dana Danilenko | Matan Zyskind; Yonathan Levit | Alina Pugach; Yuval Pugach | Misha Zilberman; Svetlana Zilberman |
| 2017 | Misha Zilberman | Dana Kugel | Daniel Chislov; Yonathan Levit | Alina Pugach; Yuval Pugach | Misha Zilberman; Svetlana Zilberman |
| 2018 | Misha Zilberman | Ksenia Polikarpova | Alex Bass; Lior Kroyter | Dana Danilenko; Margeret Lurie | Misha Zilberman; Dana Danilenko |
| 2019 | Misha Zilberman | Ksenia Polikarpova | Ariel Shainski; Misha Zilberman | Dana Danilenko; Margeret Lurie | May Bar Netzer; Ksenia Polikarpova |
| 2020 | No competition | | | | |
| 2021 | Misha Zilberman | Ksenia Polikarpova | Ariel Shainski; Misha Zilberman | Dana Kugel; Heli Neiman | Maxim Grinblat; Dana Danilenko |
| 2022 | Misha Zilberman | Ksenia Polikarpova | Ariel Shainski; Misha Zilberman | Anna Kirilova; Margaret Lurie | Maxim Grinblat; Anna Kirilova |
| 2023 | Misha Zilberman | Heli Neiman | Daniil Dubovenko; Misha Zilberman | Anna Kirilova; Margaret Lurie | Ariel Shainski; Dana Danilenko |
| 2024 | Misha Zilberman | Heli Neiman | Danilo Dubinsky; Misha Zilberman | Alina Bergelson; Heli Neiman | Danilo Dubinsky; Dana Danilenko |
| 2025 | Misha Zilberman | Heli Neiman | Danilo Dubinsky; Misha Zilberman | Alina Bergelson; Heli Neiman | Danilo Dubinsky; Dana Danilenko |
