= Israel national badminton team =

Israeli national badminton team

Israel
- Association: Israel Badminton Association
- Confederation: Badminton Europe
- President: Nir Sade

BWF ranking
- Current ranking: 38 ▼16 (3 January 2023)
- Highest ranking: 20 (2 July 2019)

Sudirman Cup
- Appearances: 10 (first in 1993)
- Best result: Group stage

European Mixed Team Championships
- Appearances: 3 (first in 2009)
- Best result: Group stage

European Men's Team Championships
- Appearances: 5 (first in 2006)
- Best result: Group stage

European Women's Team Championships
- Appearances: 2 (first in 2018)
- Best result: Group stage

Helvetia Cup
- Appearances: 6 (first in 1995)
- Best result: 11th (1997)

The Israel national badminton team (Hebrew: נבחרת ישראל בבדמינטון) represents Israel in international badminton team competitions. The Israel Badminton Association controls the national team and the players' ability to join tournaments.

Israel participated in the 2019 Sudirman Cup and were placed into Group 3B, along with Canada, Germany and Singapore. The team faced the United States in the knockout stage and lost the tie 1–3. The team finished in 20th place. The men's and women's team participated in the European Men's and Women's Team Badminton Championships.

Israel also participates in para-badminton. Its national players Amir Levi and Nina Gorodetzky are world number one in the mixed doubles WH1-WH2 discipline.

== Competitive record ==
=== Thomas Cup ===
Year	Round	Pos
1949	Did not enter	
1952	Did not enter	
1955	Did not enter	
1958	Did not enter	
1961	Did not enter	
1964	Did not enter	
1967	Did not enter	
1970	Did not enter	
1973	Did not enter	
1976	Did not enter	
1979	Did not enter	
1982	Did not enter	
1984	Did not enter	
1986	Did not enter	
1988	Did not enter	
1990	Did not qualify	
1992	Did not qualify	
1994	Did not qualify	
1996	Did not qualify	
1998
2000
2002	Did not qualify	
2004	Did not qualify	

Sudirman Cup

Year	Result
1993	39th - Group 9
1995	41st - Group 10
1997	40th - Group 6
1999	36th - Group 5
2001	38th - Group 5
2003	38th - Group 5
2005	36th - Group 5
2011	32nd - Group 4
2015	32nd - Group 4
2019	20th - Group 2

== Participation in European Team Badminton Championships ==
Men's Team

Year	Result
(Greece) 2006	Group stage
(Netherlands) 2008	Group stage
(Switzerland) 2014	Group stage
(Russia) 2018	Group stage
(France) 2020	Group stage
(Poland) 2024	Did not qualify
(Turkey) 2026	Did not qualify

Women's Team

Year	Result
(Russia) 2018	Group stage
(France) 2020	Group stage
(Poland) 2024	Did not qualify
(Turkey) 2026	Did not qualify

Mixed Team

Year	Result
(England) 2009	Group stage
(Netherlands) 2011	Group stage
(Russia) 2013	Group stage
(Azerbaijan) 2025	Did not qualify

== Participation in Helvetia Cup ==
Year	Result
(Cyprus) 1995	14th place
(France) 1997	11th place
(Czech Republic) 2001	14th place
(Portugal) 2003	12th place
(Cyprus) 2005	20th place
(Iceland) 2007	16th place

== Participation in European Junior Team Badminton Championships ==
Mixed Team

Year	Result
(Finland) 2011	Group stage
(Turkey) 2013	Group stage
(Estonia) 2018	Group stage
(Serbia) 2022	Group stage
(Spain) 2024	Group stage

== Players ==
The following players were selected to represent Israel at the 2020 European Men's and Women's Team Badminton Championships.

Men

- Misha Zilberman
- Ariel Shainski
- Yonathan Levit
- Ofir Belenki
- Shoni Schwartzman
- May Bar Netzer
- Maxim Grinblat

Women

- Ksenia Polikarpova
- Dana Danilenko
- Anastasia Bantish
- Heli Neiman
- Yuval Pugach
- Shery Rotshtein
- Margeret Lurie
