= 2013 European Mixed Team Badminton Championships =

Tournament details
- Dates: 12–17 February 2013
- Venue: Borisoglebsky Arena
- Location: Moscow, Russia

The 2013 European Mixed Team Badminton Championships were held at the Borisoglebsky Arena in Ramenskoye, Moscow Oblast, Russia, from 12 to 17 February 2013, and were organised by the Badminton Europe and the National Badminton Federation of Russia.

== Medalists ==
Event	Gold	Silver	Bronze
Mixed Team	Germany	Denmark	England Russia

== Group stage ==
=== Group 1 ===
Pos	Team	Pld	W	L	MF	MA	MD	GF	GA	GD	PF	PA	PD	Pts	Qualification
1	Denmark	2	2	0	10	0	+10	20	1	+19	444	261	+183	2	Knockout stage
2	Turkey	2	1	1	4	6	−2	10	13	−3	373	413	−40	1	
3	Norway	2	0	2	1	9	−8	3	19	−16	298	441	−143	0	

Source: BWF

==== Denmark vs Norway ====
Denmark
5
Borisoglebsky Arena, Court 2
12 February 2013, 19:00

Norway
0

			1	2	3
1	(Denmark) (Norway)	Rasmus Bonde / Line Kjærsfeldt; Jonas Christensen / Marie Wåland	21; 10	21; 9
2	(Denmark) (Norway)	Viktor Axelsen; Marius Myhre	21; 16	21; 16
3	(Denmark) (Norway)	Natalia Koch Rohde; Cathrine Fossmo	21; 8	25; 23
4	(Denmark) (Norway)	Rasmus Bonde / Mads Conrad-Petersen; Jonas Christensen / Marius Myhre	21; 8	21; 12
5	(Denmark) (Norway)	Line Damkjær Kruse / Line Kjærsfeldt; Cathrine Fossmo / Marie Wåland	21; 3	21; 10

==== Norway vs Turkey ====
Norway
1
Borisoglebsky Arena, Court 1
13 February 2013, 14:00

Turkey
4

			1	2	3
1	(Norway) (Turkey)	Marius Myhre; Ramazan Öztürk	21; 13	17; 21	21; 9
2	(Norway) (Turkey)	Cathrine Fossmo; Özge Bayrak	17; 21	8; 21
3	(Norway) (Turkey)	Jonas Christensen / Marius Myhre; Murat Şen / Emre Vural	21; 16	19; 21	19; 21
4	(Norway) (Turkey)	Helene Søgaard / Marie Wåland; Cemre Fere / Neslihan Kılıç	9; 21	8; 21
5	(Norway) (Turkey)	Jonas Christensen / Cathrine Fossmo; Emre Vural / Neslihan Kılıç	7; 21	16; 21

==== Denmark vs Turkey ====
Denmark
5
Borisoglebsky Arena, Court 4
14 February 2013, 10:00

Turkey
0

			1	2	3
1	(Denmark) (Turkey)	Rasmus Bonde / Line Damkjær Kruse; Ramazan Öztürk / Neslihan Kılıç	21; 11	21; 13
2	(Denmark) (Turkey)	Viktor Axelsen; Murat Şen	21; 9	21; 17
3	(Denmark) (Turkey)	Line Kjærsfeldt; Özge Bayrak	21; 17	21; 10
4	(Denmark) (Turkey)	Rasmus Bonde / Mads Conrad-Petersen; Murat Şen / Emre Vural	21; 11	21; 10
5	(Denmark) (Turkey)	Line Damkjær Kruse / Natalia Koch Rohde; Cemre Fere / Neslihan Kılıç	21; 10	20; 22	21; 16

=== Group 2 ===
Pos	Team	Pld	W	L	MF	MA	MD	GF	GA	GD	PF	PA	PD	Pts	Qualification
1	Germany	2	2	0	9	1	+8	18	3	+15	426	264	+162	2	Knockout stage
2	Spain	2	1	1	5	5	0	10	10	0	332	332	0	1	
3	Estonia	2	0	2	1	9	−8	3	18	−15	267	429	−162	0	

Source: BWF

==== Germany vs Estonia ====
Germany
5
Borisoglebsky Arena, Court 5
12 February 2013, 14:00

Estonia
0

			1	2	3
1	(Germany) (Estonia)	Johannes Schöttler / Carla Nyenhuis; Raul Käsner / Kristin Kuuba	21; 19	21; 10
2	(Germany) (Estonia)	Marc Zwiebler; Raul Must	17; 21	21; 9	21; 16
3	(Germany) (Estonia)	Olga Roj; Karoliine Hõim	21; 10	21; 8
4	(Germany) (Estonia)	Michael Fuchs / Oliver Roth; Rainer Kaljumäe / Raul Käsner	21; 8	21; 11
5	(Germany) (Estonia)	Johanna Käpplein / Juliane Schenk; Kristin Kuuba / Helina Rüütel	21; 8	21; 14

==== Estonia vs Spain ====
Estonia
1
Borisoglebsky Arena, Court 2
13 February 2013, 14:00

Spain
4

			1	2	3
1	(Estonia) (Spain)	Raul Käsner / Karoliine Hõim; Pablo Abián / Carolina Marín	7; 21	18; 21
2	(Estonia) (Spain)	Raul Must; Ernesto Velázquez	21; 17	21; 17
3	(Estonia) (Spain)	Laura Vana; Beatriz Corrales	8; 21	13; 21
4	(Estonia) (Spain)	Rainer Kaljumäe / Raul Käsner; Pablo Abián / Ernesto Velázquez	14; 21	12; 21
5	(Estonia) (Spain)	Kristin Kuuba / Helina Rüütel; Beatriz Corrales / Carolina Marín	9; 21	10; 21

==== Germany vs Spain ====
Germany
4
Borisoglebsky Arena, Court 1
14 February 2013, 18:30

Spain
1

			1	2	3
1	(Germany) (Spain)	Michael Fuchs / Birgit Overzier; Ernesto Velázquez / Beatriz Corrales	21; 9	21; 8
2	(Germany) (Spain)	Marc Zwiebler; Pablo Abián	21; 18	21; 11
3	(Germany) (Spain)	Juliane Schenk; Carolina Marín	13; 21	18; 21
4	(Germany) (Spain)	Ingo Kindervater / Johannes Schöttler; Pablo Abián / Ernesto Velázquez	21; 4	21; 10
5	(Germany) (Spain)	Johanna Käpplein / Karin Schnaase; Beatriz Corrales / Carolina Marín	21; 16	21; 12

=== Group 3 ===
Pos	Team	Pld	W	L	MF	MA	MD	GF	GA	GD	PF	PA	PD	Pts	Qualification
1	Russia	2	2	0	9	1	+8	19	2	+17	433	257	+176	2	Knockout stage
2	Bulgaria	2	1	1	5	5	0	11	12	−1	389	398	−9	1	
3	Iceland	2	0	2	1	9	−8	3	19	−16	280	447	−167	0	

Source: BWF

==== Russia vs Iceland ====
Russia
5
Borisoglebsky Arena, Court 1
12 February 2013, 18:30

Iceland
0

			1	2	3
1	(Russia) (Iceland)	Ivan Sozonov / Valeria Sorokina; Kári Gunnarsson / Snjólaug Jóhannsdóttir	21; 8	21; 5
2	(Russia) (Iceland)	Anatoliy Yartsev; Atli Jóhannesson	21; 7	21; 12
3	(Russia) (Iceland)	Natalia Perminova; Margrét Jóhannsdóttir	21; 12	21; 15
4	(Russia) (Iceland)	Andrey Ashmarin / Vitalij Durkin; Kári Gunnarsson / Atli Jóhannesson	21; 14	21; 14
5	(Russia) (Iceland)	Anastasiia Akchurina / Tatjana Bibik; Rakel Jóhannesdóttir / Snjólaug Jóhannsdóttir	21; 8	21; 10

==== Iceland vs Bulgaria ====
Iceland
1
Borisoglebsky Arena, Court 4
13 February 2013, 14:00

Bulgaria
4

			1	2	3
1	(Iceland) (Bulgaria)	Atli Jóhannesson / Snjólaug Jóhannsdóttir; Julian Hristov / Dimitria Popstoikova	9; 21	17; 21
2	(Iceland) (Bulgaria)	Kári Gunnarsson; Ivan Rusev	20; 22	21; 16	21; 12
3	(Iceland) (Bulgaria)	Margrét Jóhannsdóttir; Petya Nedelcheva	12; 21	6; 21
4	(Iceland) (Bulgaria)	Kári Gunnarsson / Atli Jóhannesson; Julian Hristov / Ivan Rusev	13; 21	21; 19	18; 21
5	(Iceland) (Bulgaria)	Rakel Jóhannesdóttir / Snjólaug Jóhannsdóttir; Petya Nedelcheva / Dimitria Popstoikova	6; 21	11; 21

==== Russia vs Bulgaria ====
Russia
4
Borisoglebsky Arena, Court 2
14 February 2013, 18:00

Bulgaria
1

			1	2	3
1	(Russia) (Bulgaria)	Andrey Ashmarin / Ksenia Polikarpova; Julian Hristov / Petya Nedelcheva	21; 16	21; 9
2	(Russia) (Bulgaria)	Vladimir Malkov; Ivan Rusev	21; 11	21; 10
3	(Russia) (Bulgaria)	Ella Diehl; Linda Zetchiri	21; 16	18; 21	16; 21
4	(Russia) (Bulgaria)	Vladimir Ivanov / Ivan Sozonov; Julian Hristov / Ivan Rusev	21; 14	21; 10
5	(Russia) (Bulgaria)	Valeria Sorokina / Nina Vislova; Petya Nedelcheva / Dimitria Popstoikova	21; 13	21; 11

=== Group 4 ===
Pos	Team	Pld	W	L	MF	MA	MD	GF	GA	GD	PF	PA	PD	Pts	Qualification
1	England	2	2	0	10	0	+10	20	1	+19	435	224	+211	2	Knockout stage
2	Lithuania	2	1	1	4	6	−2	9	13	−4	380	385	−5	1	
3	Latvia	2	0	2	1	9	−8	4	19	−15	262	468	−206	0	

Source: BWF

==== England vs Latvia ====
England
5
Borisoglebsky Arena, Court 3
12 February 2013, 10:00

Latvia
0

			1	2	3
1	(England) (Latvia)	Chris Langridge / Heather Olver; Raimonds Cipe / Kristīne Šefere	21; 10	21; 7
2	(England) (Latvia)	Toby Penty; Edijs Līviņš	21; 2	21; 8
3	(England) (Latvia)	Sarah Walker; Ieva Pope	12; 21	21; 10	21; 10
4	(England) (Latvia)	Chris Adcock / Andrew Ellis; Edijs Līviņš / Kārlis Vidas	21; 14	21; 14
5	(England) (Latvia)	Heather Olver / Jenny Wallwork; Monika Radovska / Kristīne Šefere	21; 6	21; 6

==== Latvia vs Lithuania ====
Latvia
1
Borisoglebsky Arena, Court 5
13 February 2013, 14:00

Lithuania
4

			1	2	3
1	(Latvia) (Lithuania)	Raimonds Cipe / Kristīne Šefere; Povilas Bartušis / Vytautė Fomkinaitė	12; 21	21; 19	22; 20
2	(Latvia) (Lithuania)	Kārlis Vidas; Kęstutis Navickas	10; 21	9; 21
3	(Latvia) (Lithuania)	Monika Radovska; Akvilė Stapušaitytė	10; 21	9; 21
4	(Latvia) (Lithuania)	Raimonds Cipe / Kārlis Vidas; Povilas Bartušis / Kęstutis Navickas	15; 21	15; 21
5	(Latvia) (Lithuania)	Ieva Pope / Kristīne Šefere; Vytautė Fomkinaitė / Akvilė Stapušaitytė	21; 18	13; 21	15; 21

==== England vs Lithuania ====
England
5
Borisoglebsky Arena, Court 2
14 February 2013, 14:00

Lithuania
0

			1	2	3
1	(England) (Lithuania)	Chris Adcock / Gabby White; Povilas Bartušis / Vytautė Fomkinaitė	21; 11	21; 7
2	(England) (Lithuania)	Rajiv Ouseph; Kęstutis Navickas	21; 15	24; 22
3	(England) (Lithuania)	Sarah Walker; Akvilė Stapušaitytė	21; 13	21; 18
4	(England) (Lithuania)	Chris Langridge / Peter Mills; Povilas Bartušis / Kęstutis Navickas	21; 12	21; 11
5	(England) (Lithuania)	Lauren Smith / Jenny Wallwork; Vytautė Fomkinaitė / Akvilė Stapušaitytė	21; 10	21; 15

=== Group 5 ===
Pos	Team	Pld	W	L	MF	MA	MD	GF	GA	GD	PF	PA	PD	Pts	Qualification
1	Netherlands	3	3	0	15	0	+15	30	1	+29	649	353	+296	3	Knockout stage
2	Switzerland	3	2	1	9	6	+3	20	13	+7	601	539	+62	2	
3	Hungary	3	1	2	5	10	−5	11	22	−11	500	633	−133	1	
4	Luxembourg	3	0	3	1	14	−13	4	29	−25	449	674	−225	0	

Source: BWF

==== Netherlands vs Luxembourg ====
Netherlands
5
Borisoglebsky Arena, Court 4
12 February 2013, 10:00

Luxembourg
0

			1	2	3
1	(Netherlands) (Luxembourg)	Jorrit de Ruiter / Samantha Barning; Mike Vallenthini / Myriam Havé	21; 12	21; 10
2	(Netherlands) (Luxembourg)	Eric Pang; Eric Solagna	21; 10	21; 12
3	(Netherlands) (Luxembourg)	Patty Stolzenbach; Claudine Barnig	21; 9	21; 11
4	(Netherlands) (Luxembourg)	Jacco Arends / Jorrit de Ruiter; Eric Solagna / Mike Vallenthini	21; 11	21; 13
5	(Netherlands) (Luxembourg)	Selena Piek / Iris Tabeling; Myriam Havé / Aude Meyer	21; 10	21; 3

==== Hungary vs Switzerland ====
Hungary
1
Borisoglebsky Arena, Court 2
12 February 2013, 10:00

Switzerland
4

			1	2	3
1	(Hungary) (Switzerland)	Laura Sárosi; Nicole Schaller	13; 21	8; 21
2	(Hungary) (Switzerland)	Henrik Tóth; Lukas Nussbaumer	20; 22	21; 17	21; 13
3	(Hungary) (Switzerland)	Laura Sárosi / Orsolya Varga; Sabrina Jaquet / Nicole Schaller	12; 21	18; 21
4	(Hungary) (Switzerland)	Gergely Krausz / Henrik Tóth; Gilles Tripet / Florian Schmid	14; 21	18; 21
5	(Hungary) (Switzerland)	Márton Szatzker / Réka Sárosi; Anthony Dumartheray / Sabrina Jaquet	10; 21	10; 21

==== Netherlands vs Hungary ====
Netherlands
5
Borisoglebsky Arena, Court 4
13 February 2013, 18:00

Hungary
0

			1	2	3
1	(Netherlands) (Hungary)	Eric Pang; Gergely Krausz	21; 15	21; 9
2	(Netherlands) (Hungary)	Patty Stolzenbach; Laura Sárosi	21; 13	21; 19
3	(Netherlands) (Hungary)	Jacco Arends / Jorrit de Ruiter; Gergely Krausz / Márton Szatzker	21; 5	21; 7
4	(Netherlands) (Hungary)	Selena Piek / Iris Tabeling; Réka Sárosi / Orsolya Varga	21; 4	21; 5
5	(Netherlands) (Hungary)	Jorrit de Ruiter / Samantha Barning; Henrik Tóth / Laura Sárosi	21; 12	21; 10

==== Luxembourg vs Switzerland ====
Luxembourg
5
Borisoglebsky Arena, Court 5
13 February 2013, 18:00

Switzerland
0

			1	2	3
1	(Luxembourg) (Switzerland)	Mike Vallenthini / Myriam Havé; Anthony Dumartheray / Tiffany Girona	13; 21	18; 21
2	(Luxembourg) (Switzerland)	Claudine Barnig; Sabrina Jaquet	8; 21	14; 21
3	(Luxembourg) (Switzerland)	Eric Solagna; Anthony Dumartheray	10; 21	10; 21
4	(Luxembourg) (Switzerland)	Claudine Barnig / Myriam Havé; Tiffany Girona / Nicole Schaller	8; 21	17; 21
5	(Luxembourg) (Switzerland)	Eric Solagna / Mike Vallenthini; Gilles Tripet / Florian Schmid	13; 21	21; 18	13; 21

==== Netherlands vs Switzerland ====
Netherlands
5
Borisoglebsky Arena, Court 1
14 February 2013, 14:00

Switzerland
0

			1	2	3
1	(Netherlands) (Switzerland)	Jorrit de Ruiter / Samantha Barning; Anthony Dumartheray / Sabrina Jaquet	21; 12	21; 19
2	(Netherlands) (Switzerland)	Eric Pang; Lukas Nussbaumer	21; 17	21; 13
3	(Netherlands) (Switzerland)	Patty Stolzenbach; Nicole Schaller	19; 21	21; 18	21; 16
4	(Netherlands) (Switzerland)	Jacco Arends / Jorrit de Ruiter; Gilles Tripet / Florian Schmid	21; 6	21; 7
5	(Netherlands) (Switzerland)	Selena Piek / Iris Tabeling; Sabrina Jaquet / Nicole Schaller	21; 12	21; 12

==== Luxembourg vs Hungary ====
Luxembourg
1
Borisoglebsky Arena, Court 5
14 February 2013, 14:00

Hungary
4

			1	2	3
1	(Luxembourg) (Hungary)	Mike Vallenthini / Myriam Havé; Márton Szatzker / Réka Sárosi	21; 14	14; 21	9; 18	retired
2	(Luxembourg) (Hungary)	Eric Solagna; Gergely Krausz	15; 21	13; 21
3	(Luxembourg) (Hungary)	Claudine Barnig; Orsolya Varga	21; 15	20; 22	21; 18
4	(Luxembourg) (Hungary)	Eric Solagna / Valeriy Strelcov; Gergely Krausz / Henrik Tóth	20; 22	20; 22
5	(Luxembourg) (Hungary)	Claudine Barnig / Myriam Havé; Laura Sárosi / Réka Sárosi	14; 21	15; 21

=== Group 6 ===
Pos	Team	Pld	W	L	MF	MA	MD	GF	GA	GD	PF	PA	PD	Pts	Qualification
1	France	3	3	0	11	4	+7	23	12	+11	674	567	+107	3	Knockout stage
2	Ireland	3	2	1	10	5	+5	22	11	+11	636	524	+112	2	
3	Finland	3	1	2	8	7	+1	19	17	+2	641	643	−2	1	
4	Israel	3	0	3	1	14	−13	4	28	−24	441	658	−217	0	

Source: BWF

==== France vs Israel ====
France
5
Borisoglebsky Arena, Court 4
12 February 2013, 10:00

Israel
0

			1	2	3
1	(France) (Israel)	Baptiste Carême / Audrey Fontaine; Daniel Chislov / Alina Pugach	21; 12	21; 10
2	(France) (Israel)	Brice Leverdez; Misha Zilberman	21; 19	21; 19
3	(France) (Israel)	Perrine Le Buhanic; Dana Kugel	21; 9	21; 10
4	(France) (Israel)	Ronan Labar / Gaëtan Mittelheisser; Itay Elazar / Ziv Nadil	21; 10	21; 11
5	(France) (Israel)	Delphine Lansac / Émilie Lefel; Dana Kugel / Alina Pugach	21; 13	21; 9

==== Finland vs Ireland ====
Finland
1
Borisoglebsky Arena, Court 1
12 February 2013, 10:00

Ireland
4

			1	2	3
1	(Finland) (Republic of Ireland)	Anton Kaisti / Sanni Rautala; Sam Magee / Chloe Magee	21; 18	17; 21	13; 21
2	(Finland) (Republic of Ireland)	Ville Lång; Scott Evans	16; 21	13; 21
3	(Finland) (Republic of Ireland)	Airi Mikkelä; Chloe Magee	12; 21	11; 21
4	(Finland) (Republic of Ireland)	Eetu Heino / Ville Lång; Scott Evans / Sam Magee	15; 21	17; 21
5	(Finland) (Republic of Ireland)	Airi Mikkelä / Sanni Rautala; Sinead Chambers / Jennie King	21; 12	21; 16

==== France vs Finland ====
France
3
Borisoglebsky Arena, Court 4
13 February 2013, 18:00

Finland
2

			1	2	3
1	(France) (Finland)	Perrine Le Buhanic; Airi Mikkelä	16; 21	21; 19	21; 9
2	(France) (Finland)	Matthieu Lo Ying Ping; Eetu Heino	18; 21	11; 21
3	(France) (Finland)	Audrey Fontaine / Émilie Lefel; Airi Mikkelä / Sanni Rautala	21; 6	21; 13
4	(France) (Finland)	Baptiste Carême / Gaëtan Mittelheisser; Eetu Heino / Ville Lång	21; 7	19; 21	21; 17
5	(France) (Finland)	Ronan Labar / Audrey Fontaine; Anton Kaisti / Sanni Rautala	18; 21	22; 20	14; 21

==== Israel vs Ireland ====
Israel
1
Borisoglebsky Arena, Court 2
13 February 2013, 18:00

Ireland
4

			1	2	3
1	(Israel) (Republic of Ireland)	Daniel Chislov / Alina Pugach; Sam Magee / Chloe Magee	10; 21	12; 21
2	(Israel) (Republic of Ireland)	Misha Zilberman; Jonathan Dolan	21; 16	21; 17
3	(Israel) (Republic of Ireland)	Dana Kugel; Chloe Magee	4; 21	11; 21
4	(Israel) (Republic of Ireland)	Itay Elazar / Ziv Nadil; Scott Evans / Sam Magee	10; 21	13; 21
5	(Israel) (Republic of Ireland)	Dana Kugel / Alina Pugach; Sinead Chambers / Jennie King	13; 21	12; 21

==== France vs Ireland ====
France
3
Borisoglebsky Arena, Court 2
14 February 2013, 14:00

Ireland
2

			1	2	3
1	(France) (Republic of Ireland)	Ronan Labar / Émilie Lefel; Sam Magee / Chloe Magee	18; 21	12; 21
2	(France) (Republic of Ireland)	Brice Leverdez; Scott Evans	21; 19	17; 21	21; 17
3	(France) (Republic of Ireland)	Perrine Le Buhanic; Chloe Magee	16; 21	15; 21
4	(France) (Republic of Ireland)	Baptiste Carême / Gaëtan Mittelheisser; Scott Evans / Sam Magee	16; 21	21; 16	21; 15
5	(France) (Republic of Ireland)	Delphine Lansac / Émilie Lefel; Sinead Chambers / Jennie King	21; 12	21; 16

==== Israel vs Finland ====
Israel
0
Borisoglebsky Arena, Court 3
14 February 2013, 14:00

Finland
5

			1	2	3
1	(Israel) (Finland)	Dana Kugel; Airi Mikkelä	15; 21	9; 21
2	(Israel) (Finland)	Misha Zilberman; Eetu Heino	19; 21	21; 16	17; 21
3	(Israel) (Finland)	Dana Kugel / Alina Pugach; Airi Mikkelä / Sanni Rautala	9; 21	17; 21
4	(Israel) (Finland)	Itay Elazar / Ziv Nadil; Eetu Heino / Ville Lång	12; 21	15; 21
5	(Israel) (Finland)	Daniel Chislov / Alina Pugach; Anton Kaisti / Sanni Rautala	19; 21	23; 21	9; 21

=== Group 7 ===
Pos	Team	Pld	W	L	MF	MA	MD	GF	GA	GD	PF	PA	PD	Pts	Qualification
1	Ukraine	3	2	1	11	4	+7	22	14	+8	691	602	+89	2	Knockout stage
2	Sweden	3	2	1	9	6	+3	21	12	+9	609	523	+86	2	
3	Belgium	3	2	1	9	6	+3	21	15	+6	675	642	+33	2	
4	Belarus	3	0	3	1	14	−13	5	28	−23	453	661	−208	0	

Source: BWF

==== Sweden vs Belarus ====
Sweden
4
Borisoglebsky Arena, Court 4
12 February 2013, 14:00

Belarus
1

			1	2	3
1	(Sweden) (Belarus)	Henri Hurskainen; Dzmitry Saidakou	21; 9	21; 7
2	(Sweden) (Belarus)	Ellinor Widh; Alesia Zaitsava	15; 21	11; 21
3	(Sweden) (Belarus)	Patrick Lundqvist / Jonatan Nordh; Vladzislav Kushnir / Dzmitry Saidakou	21; 9	21; 7
4	(Sweden) (Belarus)	Emelie Lennartsson / Emma Wengberg; Anastasiya Cherniavskaya / Elena Lukashevich	21; 11	21; 4
5	(Sweden) (Belarus)	Nico Ruponen / Amanda Högström; Andrey Konakh / Alesia Zaitsava	21; 9	21; 12

==== Ukraine vs Belgium ====
Ukraine
4
Borisoglebsky Arena, Court 1
12 February 2013, 14:00

Belgium
1

			1	2	3
1	(Ukraine) (Belgium)	Valeriy Atrashchenkov / Anna Kobceva; Matijs Dierickx / Debbie Janssens	21; 17	21; 17
2	(Ukraine) (Belgium)	Dmytro Zavadsky; Yuhan Tan	21; 12	15; 21	21; 15
3	(Ukraine) (Belgium)	Marija Ulitina; Lianne Tan	21; 19	20; 22	24; 22
4	(Ukraine) (Belgium)	Vitaliy Konov / Dmytro Zavadsky; Matijs Dierickx / Freek Golinski	21; 14	13; 21	21; 10
5	(Ukraine) (Belgium)	Larisa Griga / Anna Kobceva; Steffi Annys / Séverine Corvilain	20; 22	14; 21

==== Sweden vs Ukraine ====
Sweden
3
Borisoglebsky Arena, Court 2
13 February 2013, 10:00

Ukraine
2

			1	2	3
1	(Sweden) (Ukraine)	Jonatan Nordh / Emelie Lennartsson; Valeriy Atrashchenkov / Anna Kobceva	19; 21	20; 22
2	(Sweden) (Ukraine)	Henri Hurskainen; Dmytro Zavadsky	15; 21	21; 18	3; 2	retired
3	(Sweden) (Ukraine)	Ellinor Widh; Marija Ulitina	21; 18	13; 21	21; 18
4	(Sweden) (Ukraine)	Patrick Lundqvist / Jonatan Nordh; Valeriy Atrashchenkov / Artem Pochtarov	21; 16	21; 19
5	(Sweden) (Ukraine)	Emelie Lennartsson / Emma Wengberg; Yuliya Kazarinova / Anna Kobceva	21; 11	21; 17

==== Belarus vs Belgium ====
Belarus
0
Borisoglebsky Arena, Court 3
13 February 2013, 10:00

Belgium
5

			1	2	3
1	(Belarus) (Belgium)	Andrey Konakh / Alesia Zaitsava; Freek Golinski / Séverine Corvilain	19; 21	21; 11	14; 21
2	(Belarus) (Belgium)	Vladzislav Kushnir; Maxime Moreels	12; 21	8; 21
3	(Belarus) (Belgium)	Alesia Zaitsava; Lianne Tan	21; 23	21; 9	20; 22
4	(Belarus) (Belgium)	Vladzislav Kushnir / Dzmitry Saidakou; Matijs Dierickx / Freek Golinski	13; 21	9; 21
5	(Belarus) (Belgium)	Anastasiya Cherniavskaya / Elena Lukashevich; Steffi Annys / Séverine Corvilain	15; 21	18; 21

==== Sweden vs Belgium ====
Sweden
2
Borisoglebsky Arena, Court 1
14 February 2013, 10:00

Belgium
3

			1	2	3
1	(Sweden) (Belgium)	Jonatan Nordh / Emelie Lennartsson; Matijs Dierickx / Debbie Janssens	21; 17	21; 19
2	(Sweden) (Belgium)	Mattias Borg; Yuhan Tan	18; 21	19; 21
3	(Sweden) (Belgium)	Ellinor Widh; Lianne Tan	11; 21	14; 21
4	(Sweden) (Belgium)	Patrick Lundqvist / Jonatan Nordh; Matijs Dierickx / Freek Golinski	21; 19	15; 21	16; 21
5	(Sweden) (Belgium)	Emelie Lennartsson / Emma Wengberg; Steffi Annys / Séverine Corvilain	21; 14	21; 14

==== Belarus vs Ukraine ====
Belarus
0
Borisoglebsky Arena, Court 5
14 February 2013, 10:00

Ukraine
5

			1	2	3
1	(Belarus) (Ukraine)	Alesia Zaitsava; Marija Ulitina	20; 22	25; 23	12; 21
2	(Belarus) (Ukraine)	Dzmitry Saidakou; Valeriy Atrashchenkov	6; 21	17; 21
3	(Belarus) (Ukraine)	Anastasiya Cherniavskaya / Elena Lukashevich; Yuliya Kazarinova / Anna Kobceva	10; 21	9; 21
4	(Belarus) (Ukraine)	Vladzislav Kushnir / Dzmitry Saidakou; Gennadiy Natarov / Artem Pochtarov	7; 21	19; 21
5	(Belarus) (Ukraine)	Andrey Konakh / Anastasiya Cherniavskaya; Valeriy Atrashchenkov / Anna Kobceva	14; 21	13; 21

=== Group 8 ===
Pos	Team	Pld	W	L	MF	MA	MD	GF	GA	GD	PF	PA	PD	Pts	Qualification
1	Scotland	2	2	0	13	2	+11	16	7	+9	444	326	+118	2	Knockout stage
2	Czech Republic	2	1	1	12	3	+9	16	6	+10	415	315	+100	1	
3	Slovakia	2	0	2	5	10	−5	1	20	−19	217	435	−218	0	
4	Wales	0	0	0	0	0	0	0	0	0	0	0	0	0	Withdrew

Source: BWF

==== Scotland vs Slovakia ====
Scotland
5
Borisoglebsky Arena, Court 2
12 February 2013, 14:00

Slovakia
0

			1	2	3
1	(Scotland) (Slovakia)	Paul van Rietvelde / Imogen Bankier; Matej Hliničan / Martina Repiská	21; 12	21; 6
2	(Scotland) (Slovakia)	Calum Menzies; Jarolím Vícen	21; 12	21; 12
3	(Scotland) (Slovakia)	Kirsty Gilmour; Monika Fašungová	21; 8	21; 12
4	(Scotland) (Slovakia)	Martin Campbell / Jamie Neill; Matej Hliničan / Jarolím Vícen	15; 21	21; 10	21; 9
5	(Scotland) (Slovakia)	Jillie Cooper / Kirsty Gilmour; Monika Fašungová / Martina Repiská	21; 13	21; 6

==== Wales vs Czech Republic ====
Wales
Withdrew
Borisoglebsky Arena, Court 3
12 February 2013, 14:00

Czech Republic
-

		1	2	3
1	(Wales) (Czech Republic)
2	(Wales) (Czech Republic)
3	(Wales) (Czech Republic)
4	(Wales) (Czech Republic)
5	(Wales) (Czech Republic)

==== Scotland vs Wales ====
Scotland
-
Borisoglebsky Arena, Court 5
13 February 2013, 10:00

Wales
Withdrew

		1	2	3
1	(Scotland) (Wales)
2	(Scotland) (Wales)
3	(Scotland) (Wales)
4	(Scotland) (Wales)
5	(Scotland) (Wales)

==== Slovakia vs Czech Republic ====
Slovakia
0
Borisoglebsky Arena, Court 1
13 February 2013, 10:00

Czech Republic
5

			1	2	3
1	(Slovakia) (Czech Republic)	Jarolím Vícen / Monika Fašungová; Jakub Bitman / Alžběta Bášová	11; 21	14; 21
2	(Slovakia) (Czech Republic)	Matej Hliničan; Petr Koukal	11; 21	4; 21
3	(Slovakia) (Czech Republic)	Martina Repiská; Kristína Gavnholt	6; 21	9; 21
4	(Slovakia) (Czech Republic)	Matej Hliničan / Jarolím Vícen; Pavel Florián / Ondřej Kopřiva	11; 21	17; 21
5	(Slovakia) (Czech Republic)	Monika Fašungová / Martina Repiská; Kristína Gavnholt / Hana Milisová	7; 21	6; 21

==== Scotland vs Czech Republic ====
Scotland
3
Borisoglebsky Arena, Court 2
14 February 2013, 10:00

Czech Republic
2

			1	2	3
1	(Scotland) (Czech Republic)	Paul van Rietvelde / Imogen Bankier; Jakub Bitman / Alžběta Bášová	14; 21	21; 7	21; 12
2	(Scotland) (Czech Republic)	Calum Menzies; Petr Koukal	19; 21	16; 21
3	(Scotland) (Czech Republic)	Kirsty Gilmour; Kristína Gavnholt	16; 21	6; 21
4	(Scotland) (Czech Republic)	Martin Campbell / Paul van Rietvelde; Matijs Dierickx / Freek Golinski	21; 9	21; 23	21; 11
5	(Scotland) (Czech Republic)	Imogen Bankier / Jillie Cooper; Kristína Gavnholt / Hana Milisová	22; 20	21; 18

==== Slovakia vs Wales ====
Slovakia
-
Borisoglebsky Arena, Court 3
14 February 2013, 10:00

Wales
Withdrew

		1	2	3
1	(Slovakia) (Wales)
2	(Slovakia) (Wales)
3	(Slovakia) (Wales)
4	(Slovakia) (Wales)
5	(Slovakia) (Wales)

== Knockout stage ==
Quarterfinals
15 February
Denmark	3
Scotland	0
15 February
England	3
Ukraine	1
15 February
Netherlands	0
Russia	3
15 February
France	0
Germany	3

Semifinals
16 February
Denmark	3
England	2
16 February
Russia	1
Germany	3

Final
17 February
Denmark	0
Germany	3

=== Quarterfinals ===
Denmark
3
Borisoglebsky Arena
15 February 2013

Scotland
0

			1	2	3
1	(Denmark) (Scotland)	Joachim Fischer Nielsen / Christinna Pedersen; Paul van Rietvelde / Imogen Bankier	21; 18	21; 17
2	(Denmark) (Scotland)	Hans-Kristian Vittinghus; Calum Menzies	21; 5	21; 10
3	(Denmark) (Scotland)	Natalia Koch Rode; Caitlin Pringle	21; 12	21; 12
4	(Denmark) (Scotland)	Mathias Boe / Carsten Mogensen; Martin Campbell / Paul van Rietvelde				not played
5	(Denmark) (Scotland)	Line Damkjaer Kruse / Kamilla Rytter Juhl; Imogen Bankier / Jillie Cooper				not played

England
3
Borisoglebsky Arena
15 February 2013

Ukraine
1

			1	2	3
1	(England) (Ukraine)	Andrew Ellis / Jenny Wallwork; Valeriy Atrashchenkov / Anna Kobceva	15; 21	21; 16	21; 19
2	(England) (Ukraine)	Rajiv Ouseph; Dmytro Zavadsky	21; 15	21; 14
3	(England) (Ukraine)	Sarah Walker; Larisa Griga	23; 25	21; 18	17; 21
4	(England) (Ukraine)	Chris Adcock / Andrew Ellis; Valeriy Atrashchenkov / Dmytro Zavadsky	21; 14	21; 15
5	(England) (Ukraine)	Heather Olver / Jenny Wallwork; Yuliya Kazarinova / Anna Kobceva				not played

Netherlands
0
Borisoglebsky Arena
15 February 2013

Russia
3

			1	2	3
1	(Netherlands) (Russia)	Jorrit de Ruiter / Samantha Barning; Vladimir Ivanov / Valeria Sorokina	12; 21	10; 21
2	(Netherlands) (Russia)	Eric Pang; Vladimir Malkov	17; 21	17; 21
3	(Netherlands) (Russia)	Patty Stolzenbach; Ella Diehl	21; 9	15; 21	14; 21
4	(Netherlands) (Russia)	Jacco Arrends / Jorrit de Ruiter; Vladimir Ivanov / Ivan Sozonov				not played
5	(Netherlands) (Russia)	Selena Piek / Iris Tabeling; Nina Vislova / Valeria Sorokina				not played

France
0
Borisoglebsky Arena
15 February 2013

Germany
3

			1	2	3
1	(France) (Germany)	Baptiste Carême / Audrey Fontaine; Michael Fuchs / Birgit Michels	21; 19	14; 21	11; 21
2	(France) (Germany)	Brice Leverdez; Marc Zwiebler	22; 20	14; 21	20; 22
3	(France) (Germany)	Delphine Lansac; Juliane Schenk	16; 21	12; 21
4	(France) (Germany)	Baptiste Carême / Ronan Labar; Ingo Kindervater / Johannes Schöttler				not played
5	(France) (Germany)	Audrey Fontaine / Emelie Lefel; Johanna Goliszewski / Olga Konon				not played

=== Semifinals ===
Denmark
3
Borisoglebsky Arena
16 February 2013

England
2

			1	2	3
1	(Denmark) (England)	Joachim Fischer Nielsen / Christinna Pedersen; Chris Adcock / Jenny Wallwork	21; 13	21; 16
2	(Denmark) (England)	Viktor Axelsen; Rajiv Ouseph	16; 21	12; 21
3	(Denmark) (England)	Line Kjaersfeldt; Sarah Walker	16; 21	21; 13	21; 18
4	(Denmark) (England)	Mathias Boe / Carsten Mogensen; Chris Adcock / Andrew Ellis	21; 16	20; 22	19; 21
5	(Denmark) (England)	Christinna Pedersen / Kamilla Rytter Juhl; Heather Olver / Lauren Smith	23; 21	21; 13

Russia
1
Borisoglebsky Arena
16 February 2013

Germany
3

			1	2	3
1	(Russia) (Germany)	Ivan Sozonov / Valeria Sorokina; Michael Fuchs / Birgit Michels	21; 12	21; 17
2	(Russia) (Germany)	Vladimir Ivanov; Marc Zwiebler	13; 21	18; 21
3	(Russia) (Germany)	Ella Diehl; Juliane Schenk	17; 21	8; 21
4	(Russia) (Germany)	Vladimir Ivanov / Ivan Sozonov; Ingo Kindervater / Johannes Schoettler	9; 21	15; 21
5	(Russia) (Germany)	Valeria Sorokina / Nina Vislova; Birgit Michels / Juliane Schenk				not played

=== Final ===
Denmark
0
Borisoglebsky Arena
17 February 2013

Germany
3

			1	2	3
1	(Denmark) (Germany)	Line Kjaersfeldt; Juliane Schenk	9; 21	16; 21
2	(Denmark) (Germany)	Hans-Kristian Vittinghus; Marc Zwiebler	17; 21	21; 7	8; 21
3	(Denmark) (Germany)	Christinna Pedersen / Kamilla Rytter Juhl; Birgit Michels / Juliane Schenk	19; 21	15; 21
4	(Denmark) (Germany)	Mathias Boe / Carsten Mogensen; Ingo Kindervater / Johannes Schoettler				not played
5	(Denmark) (Germany)	Joachim Fischer Nielsen / Christinna Pedersen; Michael Fuchs / Birgit Michels				not played
