= 2015 Bitburger Open Grand Prix Gold =

Tournament details
- Dates: 27 October 2015 – 1 November 2015
- Level: Grand Prix Gold
- Total prize money: US$120,000
- Venue: Saarlandhalle
- Location: Saarbrücken, Germany

Champions
- Men's singles: (Hong Kong) Ng Ka Long
- Women's singles: (Japan) Akane Yamaguchi
- Men's doubles: (Denmark) Mads Conrad-Petersen (Denmark) Mads Pieler Kolding
- Women's doubles: (China) Tang Yuanting (China) Yu Yang
- Mixed doubles: (Poland) Robert Mateusiak (Poland) Nadiezda Zieba

The 2015 Bitburger Open Grand Prix Gold was the fortieth grand prix gold and grand prix tournament of the 2015 BWF Grand Prix and Grand Prix Gold. The tournament was held in Saarlandhalle, Saarbrücken, Germany October 27 until November 1, 2015, and had a total purse of $120,000.

== Men's singles ==
=== Seeds ===
1. (Chinese Taipei) Chou Tien-chen (quarterfinals)
2. (Indonesia) Tommy Sugiarto (third round)
3. (Germany) Marc Zwiebler (semifinals)
4. (Denmark) Hans-Kristian Vittinghus (quarterfinals)
5. (England) Rajiv Ouseph (semifinals)
6. (Thailand) Tanongsak Saensomboonsuk (third round)
7. (Japan) Sho Sasaki (second round)
8. (Chinese Taipei) Hsu Jen-hao (quarterfinals)
9. (Indonesia) Dionysius Hayom Rumbaka (third round)
10. (Japan) Takuma Ueda (second round)
11. (Thailand) Boonsak Ponsana (second round)
12. (Hong Kong) Wong Wing Ki (final)
13. (Hong Kong) Ng Ka Long (champion)
14. (Malaysia) Chong Wei Feng (third round)
15. (Republic of Ireland) Scott Evans (third round)
16. (India) B. Sai Praneeth (third round)

=== Finals ===
Quarterfinals
1	(Chinese Taipei) Chou Tien-chen	21	16	14
13	(Hong Kong) Ng Ka Long	16	21	21
4	(Denmark) Hans-Kristian Vittinghus	26	9	13
5	(England) Rajiv Ouseph	24	21	21
8	(Chinese Taipei) Hsu Jen-hao	21	21	15
3	(Germany) Marc Zwiebler	17	23	21
12	(Hong Kong) Wong Wing Ki	21	21	21
(Chinese Taipei) Wang Tzu-wei	13	23	18

Semifinals
13	(Hong Kong) Ng Ka Long	21	18	21
5	(England) Rajiv Ouseph	16	21	18
3	(Germany) Marc Zwiebler	21	12	11
12	(Hong Kong) Wong Wing Ki	18	21	21

Final
13	(Hong Kong) Ng Ka Long	21	21
12	(Hong Kong) Wong Wing Ki	12	13

=== Top half ===
==== Section 1 ====
First Round
1	(Chinese Taipei) Chou T-c	21	21
Q7	(Germany) A Roovers	19	19
(Belgium) M Moreels	21	21
Q2	(Russia) A Ivanov	13	11
9	(Indonesia) D H Rumbaka	21	21
(Malaysia) M A Abdul Latif	19	15
(Poland) M Dubowski	14	21	18
(Germany) L Schaenzler	21	17	21

Second Round
1	(Chinese Taipei) Chou T-c	14	21	21
(Belgium) M Moreels	21	7	10
9	(Indonesia) D H Rumbaka	21	21
(Germany) L Schaenzler	16	17

Third Round
1	(Chinese Taipei) Chou T-c	21	21
9	(Indonesia) D H Rumbaka	17	16

==== Section 2 ====
First Round
6	(Thailand) T Saensomboonsuk	21	21
PFQ	(Germany) D Benz	18	16
PFQ	(England) M Spencer-Smith	10
(Germany) F Roth	6^{r}
13	(Hong Kong) Ng K L	21	21
(Denmark) C L Thomsen	16	14
(Germany) D Domke	21	21
(Finland) K Lehikoinen	12	15

Second Round
6	(Thailand) T Saensomboonsuk	21	21
PFQ	(England) M Spencer-Smith	7	14
13	(Hong Kong) Ng K L	21	22
(Germany) D Domke	18	20

Third Round
6	(Thailand) T Saensomboonsuk	6	17
13	(Hong Kong) Ng K L	21	21

==== Section 3 ====
First Round
4	(Denmark) H-K Vittinghus	21	21
(Uganda) E Ekiring	12	7
(Poland) M Rogalski	21	11	6
(Israel) M Zilberman	18	21	21
10	(Japan) T Ueda	21	21
PFQ	(Germany) M Weisskirchen	16	14
(Malaysia) Chiang J S	17	10
(Denmark) J Persson	21	21

Second Round
4	(Denmark) H-K Vittinghus	15	21	21
(Israel) M Zilberman	21	3	14
10	(Japan) T Ueda	17	17
(Denmark) J Persson	21	21

Third Round
4	(Denmark) H-K Vittinghus	21	21
(Denmark) J Persson	14	16

==== Section 4 ====
First Round
5	(England) R Ouseph	21	21
(Finland) V Lang	14	6
(Czech Republic) P Koukal	21	19	21
(Ukraine) V Atrashchenkov	10	21	14
16	(India) B S Praneeth	21	21
PFQ	(Germany) T Wadenka	12	12
(Indonesia) A K Tedjono	21	21
(Ukraine) D Zavadsky	16	18

Second Round
5	(England) R Ouseph	21	21
(Czech Republic) P Koukal	13	15
16	(India) B S Praneeth	24	21
(Indonesia) A K Tedjono	22	17

Third Round
5	(England) R Ouseph	17	21	21
16	(India) B S Praneeth	21	6	18

=== Bottom half ===
==== Section 5 ====
First Round
(Ukraine) A Pochtarev	14	9
(United States) B Seguin	21	21
(Denmark) E Holst	13	21	21
15	(Republic of Ireland) S Evans	21	10	23
(Poland) A Dziolko	21	13	5
(Netherlands) E Meijs	18	21	21
(Denmark) R Fladberg	13	21	15
8	(Chinese Taipei) Hsu J-h	21	16	21

Second Round
(United States) B Seguin	22	13	18
15	(Republic of Ireland) S Evans	20	21	21
(Netherlands) E Meijs	14	15
8	(Chinese Taipei) Hsu J-h	21	21

Third Round
15	(Republic of Ireland) S Evans	14	12
8	(Chinese Taipei) Hsu J-h	21	21

==== Section 6 ====
First Round
Q4	(Germany) L Schmidt	22	21
(Germany) P Kaemnitz	20	12
(Germany) K Schaefer	15	22	15
14	(Malaysia) Chong W F	21	20	21
(England) T Penty	21	21
Q3	(Luxembourg) R Mann	2	6
PFQ	(Republic of Ireland) J Magee	15	13
3	(Germany) M Zwiebler	21	21

Second Round
Q4	(Germany) L Schmidt	11	18
14	(Malaysia) Chong W F	21	21
(England) T Penty	21	18	19
3	(Germany) M Zwiebler	15	21	21

Third Round
14	(Malaysia) Chong W F	21	13	17
3	(Germany) M Zwiebler	17	21	21

==== Section 7 ====
First Round
Q6	(Germany) N Persson	8	12
(Russia) V Malkov	21	21
Q5	(Belgium) N Vervaeke	9	14
12	(Hong Kong) Wong W K	21	21
(Sweden) H Hurskainen	21	21
Q1	(Germany) P Discher	14	7
(Belgium) Y Tan	21	10	13
7	(Japan) S Sasaki	12	21	21

Second Round
(Russia) V Malkov	12	14
12	(Hong Kong) Wong W K	21	21
(Sweden) H Hurskainen	21	5	21
7	(Japan) S Sasaki	16	21	15

Third Round
12	(Hong Kong) Wong W K	21	21
(Sweden) H Hurskainen	19	12

==== Section 8 ====
First Round
(Chinese Taipei) Wang T-w	21	21
(Finland) E Heino	15	11
(Bulgaria) B Kisyov	0^{r}
11	(Thailand) B Ponsana	1
Q8	(France) Y Turlan	15	21	13
(Denmark) K Bruun	21	18	21
(Denmark) F Quach	9	11
2	(Indonesia) T Sugiarto	21	21

Second Round
(Chinese Taipei) Wang T-w	21	15	21
11	(Thailand) B Ponsana	16	21	14
(Denmark) K Bruun	9	15
2	(Indonesia) T Sugiarto	21	21

Third Round
(Chinese Taipei) Wang T-w	21	20	21
2	(Indonesia) T Sugiarto	10	22	10

== Women's singles ==
=== Seeds ===
1. (Spain) Carolina Marin (withdrew)
2. (Thailand) Ratchanok Intanon (semifinals)
3. (Japan) Nozomi Okuhara (quarterfinals)
4. (Japan) Akane Yamaguchi (champion)
5. (Japan) Sayaka Takahashi (withdrew)
6. (Canada) Michelle Li (withdrew)
7. (Thailand) Busanan Ongbumrungpan (final)
8. (Thailand) Porntip Buranaprasertsuk (second round)

=== Finals ===
Semifinals
(Scotland) Kirsty Gilmour	15	17
7	(Thailand) Busanan Ongbumrungpan	21	21
4	(Japan) Akane Yamaguchi	21	21
2	(Thailand) Ratchanok Intanon	8	17

Final
7	(Thailand) Busanan Ongbumrungpan	21	14	13
4	(Japan) Akane Yamaguchi	16	21	21

=== Top half ===
==== Section 1 ====
First Round
PFQ	(Mauritius) K F Kune	21	17	21
(France) S V Waran	8	21	9
Q4	(Denmark) N K Rohde	21	22
(Indonesia) L Fanetri	10	20
PFQ	(Czech Republic) K Gavnholt	21	21
(Republic of Ireland) C Magee	16	12
(Denmark) A T Madsen	8	19
(Scotland) K Gilmour	21	21

Second Round
PFQ	(Mauritius) K F Kune	17	20
Q4	(Denmark) N K Rohde	21	22
PFQ	(Czech Republic) K Gavnholt	21	14	11
(Scotland) K Gilmour	16	21	21

Quarterfinals
Q4	(Denmark) N K Rohde	13	16
(Scotland) K Gilmour	21	21

==== Section 2 ====
First Round
3	(Japan) N Okuhara	21	21
PFQ	(Nigeria) G Gabriel	10	15
Q1	(Ukraine) Y Zharka	15	21	15
(Chinese Taipei) Hsu Y-c	21	15	21
7	(Thailand) B Ongbumrungpan	21	21
(Switzerland) S Jaquet	17	17
(Russia) K Polikarpova	22	21
(Bulgaria) L Zetchiri	20	18

Second Round
3	(Japan) N Okuhara	21	21
(Chinese Taipei) Hsu Y-c	9	8
7	(Thailand) B Ongbumrungpan	21	21
(Russia) K Polikarpova	7	6

Quarterfinals
3	(Japan) N Okuhara	21	10	19
7	(Thailand) B Ongbumrungpan	17	21	21

=== Bottom half ===
==== Section 3 ====
First Round
(Denmark) L Kjaersfeldt	19	21	22
(England) F M Chapman	21	17	20
(Spain) B Corrales	21	19	21
PFQ	(Ukraine) M Ulitina	18	21	13
(Malaysia) Tee J Y	13	21	21
(United States) R Schafer	21	15	11
(Chinese Taipei) Pai Y-p	8	21	11
4	(Japan) A Yamaguchi	21	13	21

Second Round
(Denmark) L Kjaersfeldt	18	22	14
(Spain) B Corrales	21	20	21
(Malaysia) Tee J Y	18	17
4	(Japan) A Yamaguchi	21	21

Quarterfinals
(Spain) B Corrales	14	19
4	(Japan) A Yamaguchi	21	21

==== Section 4 ====
First Round
(Indonesia) M F Kusumastuti	21	21
(Bulgaria) P Nedelcheva	15	17
(Belgium) L Tan	13	12
8	(Thailand) P Buranaprasertsuk	21	21
(Russia) N Perminova	18	15
Q3	(Germany) O Konon	21	21
Q2	(Denmark) M Poulsen	14	4
2	(Thailand) R Intanon	21	21

Second Round
(Indonesia) M F Kusumastuti	13	21	24
8	(Thailand) P Buranaprasertsuk	21	19	22
Q3	(Germany) O Konon	22	9
2	(Thailand) R Intanon	24	21

Quarterfinals
(Indonesia) M F Kusumastuti	13	18
2	(Thailand) R Intanon	21	21

== Men's doubles ==
=== Seeds ===
1. (Denmark) Mads Conrad-Petersen / Mads Pieler Kolding (champion)
2. (Russia) Vladimir Ivanov / Ivan Sozonov (final)
3. (Malaysia) Goh V Shem / Tan Wee Kiong (quarterfinals)
4. (Japan) Hirokatsu Hashimoto / Noriyasu Hirata (semifinals)
5. (Denmark) Kim Astrup / Anders Skaarup Rasmussen (second round)
6. (Japan) Takeshi Kamura / Keigo Sonoda (semifinals)
7. (India) Manu Attri / B. Sumeeth Reddy (withdrew)
8. (England) Marcus Ellis / Chris Langridge (first round)

=== Finals ===
Semifinals
1	(Denmark) Mads Conrad-Petersen (Denmark) Mads Pieler Kolding	21	16	21
6	(Japan) Takeshi Kamura (Japan) Keigo Sonoda	16	21	17
4	(Japan) Hirokatsu Hashimoto (Japan) Noriyasu Hirata	18	11
2	(Russia) Vladimir Ivanov (Russia) Ivan Sozonov	21	21

Final
1	(Denmark) Mads Conrad-Petersen (Denmark) Mads Pieler Kolding	21	21
2	(Russia) Vladimir Ivanov (Russia) Ivan Sozonov	18	18

=== Top half ===
==== Section 1 ====
First Round
1	(Denmark) M Conrad-Petersen (Denmark) M Pieler Kolding
Q1	BYE
(Denmark) M Christiansen (Denmark) D Daugaard	21	19	21
(England) A Ellis (England) P Mills	13	21	19
PFQ	(Denmark) K Antonsen (Denmark) N Nohr
Q2	BYE
(Russia) V Durkin (Russia) R Kargaev	21	21
(Malaysia) Lee J Y (Malaysia) Lim Z T	16	12

Second Round
1	(Denmark) M Conrad-Petersen (Denmark) M Pieler Kolding	21	21
(Denmark) M Christiansen (Denmark) D Daugaard	18	16
PFQ	(Denmark) K Antonsen (Denmark) N Nohr	21	21
(Russia) V Durkin (Russia) R Kargaev	17	7

Quarterfinals
1	(Denmark) M Conrad-Petersen (Denmark) M Pieler Kolding	20	21	21
PFQ	(Denmark) K Antonsen (Denmark) N Nohr	22	18	19

==== Section 2 ====
First Round
3	(Malaysia) Goh V S (Malaysia) Tan W K	21	21
PFQ	(Germany) D Benz (Malaysia) Chiang J S	16	7
(Chinese Taipei) Lin C-y (Chinese Taipei) Wu H-l	21	21
PFQ	(Germany) R Beck (Germany) P Kaesbauer	18	16
6	(Japan) T Kamura (Japan) K Sonoda	21	21
PFQ	(Germany) J R Jansen (Germany) J Pistorius	19	16
(Germany) M Fuchs (Germany) J Schöttler
Q4	BYE

Second Round
3	(Malaysia) Goh V S (Malaysia) Tan W K	21	16	21
(Chinese Taipei) Lin C-y (Chinese Taipei) Wu H-l	16	21	13
6	(Japan) T Kamura (Japan) K Sonoda	21	21
(Germany) M Fuchs (Germany) J Schöttler	19	11

Quarterfinals
3	(Malaysia) Goh V S (Malaysia) Tan W K	15	16
6	(Japan) T Kamura (Japan) K Sonoda	21	21

=== Bottom half ===
==== Section 3 ====
First Round
(Thailand) D Puavaranukroh (Thailand) K Kedren
Q3	BYE
(Germany) A Heinz (Germany) F Holzer	2^{r}
5	(Denmark) K Astrup (Denmark) A S Rasmussen	4
(Republic of Ireland) J Magee (Republic of Ireland) S Magee	5
(Germany) M Schwenger (Germany) J Zurwonne	4^{r}
(Germany) M Lamsfuss (Germany) M E Seidel	13	22	18
4	(Japan) H Hashimoto (Japan) N Hirata	21	20	21

Second Round
(Thailand) D Puavaranukroh (Thailand) K Kedren	24	21
5	(Denmark) K Astrup (Denmark) A S Rasmussen	22	16
(Republic of Ireland) J Magee (Republic of Ireland) S Magee	17	11
4	(Japan) H Hashimoto (Japan) N Hirata	21	21

Quarterfinals
(Thailand) D Puavaranukroh (Thailand) K Kedren	19	13
4	(Japan) H Hashimoto (Japan) N Hirata	21	21

==== Section 4 ====
First Round
PFQ	(Austria) J Koch (Denmark) C L Thomsen	22	21
(Belgium) M Dierickx (Belgium) F Golinski	20	15
(Chinese Taipei) Chen H-l (Chinese Taipei) Wang C-l	21	21
8	(England) M Ellis (England) C Langridge	17	15
(Ukraine) G Natarov (Ukraine) A Pochtarev	15	16
(Russia) N Khakimov (Russia) V Kuznetsov	21	21
(England) P Briggs (England) T Wolfenden	19	9
2	(Russia) V Ivanov (Russia) I Sozonov	21	21

Second Round
PFQ	(Austria) J Koch (Denmark) C L Thomsen	15	12
(Chinese Taipei) Chen H-l (Chinese Taipei) Wang C-l	21	21
(Russia) N Khakimov (Russia) V Kuznetsov	17	8
2	(Russia) V Ivanov (Russia) I Sozonov	21	21

Quarterfinals
(Chinese Taipei) Chen H-l (Chinese Taipei) Wang C-l	13	10
2	(Russia) V Ivanov (Russia) I Sozonov	21	21

== Women's doubles ==
=== Seeds ===
1. (Netherlands) Eefje Muskens / Selena Piek (withdrew)
2. (India) Jwala Gutta / Ashwini Ponnappa (second round)
3. (Japan) Naoko Fukuman / Kurumi Yonao (second round)
4. (Malaysia) Vivian Hoo Kah Mun / Woon Khe Wei (semifinals)

=== Finals ===
Semifinals
(Hong Kong) Poon Lok Yan (Hong Kong) Tse Ying Suet	21	21
4	(Malaysia) Vivian Hoo Kah Mun (Malaysia) Woon Khe Wei	15	16
(China) Tang Yuanting (China) Yu Yang	21	21
(Thailand) Jongkonphan Kittiharakul (Thailand) Rawinda Prajongjai	18	8

Final
(Hong Kong) Poon Lok Yan (Hong Kong) Tse Ying Suet	10	18
(China) Tang Yuanting (China) Yu Yang	21	21

=== Top half ===
==== Section 1 ====
First Round
1	(Netherlands) E Muskens (Netherlands) S Piek
BYE
(Thailand) C Chaladchalam (Thailand) P Muenwong	16	11
(Hong Kong) Poon L Y (Hong Kong) Tse Y S	21	21
(Indonesia) P Z Bernadeth (Indonesia) A P L Variella	21	10
(Denmark) M Fruergaard (Denmark) S Thygesen	23	21
(Thailand) P Supajirakul (Thailand) S Taerattanachai	21	21
(Chinese Taipei) Hsu Y-c (Chinese Taipei) Pai Y-p	14	14

Second Round
1	(Netherlands) E Muskens (Netherlands) S Piek	w/o
(Hong Kong) Poon L Y (Hong Kong) Tse Y S
(Denmark) M Fruergaard (Denmark) S Thygesen	16	16
(Thailand) P Supajirakul (Thailand) S Taerattanachai	21	21

Quarterfinals
(Hong Kong) Poon L Y (Hong Kong) Tse Y S	17	21	21
(Thailand) P Supajirakul (Thailand) S Taerattanachai	21	18	17

==== Section 2 ====
First Round
4	(Malaysia) Vivian Hoo K M (Malaysia) Woon K W
BYE
(France) M Batomene (France) E Lefel	w/o
(Australia) L Choo (Switzerland) N Fankhauser
(Ukraine) N Voytsekh (Ukraine) Y Zharka	21	21
(Germany) L Kaminski (Germany) H Pohl	10	13
(Germany) J Goliszewski (Germany) C Nelte	21	9	14
(England) H Olver (England) L Smith	18	21	21

Second Round
4	(Malaysia) Vivian Hoo K M (Malaysia) Woon K W	21	21
(Australia) L Choo (Switzerland) N Fankhauser	17	9
(Ukraine) N Voytsekh (Ukraine) Y Zharka	19	7
(England) H Olver (England) L Smith	21	21

Quarterfinals
4	(Malaysia) Vivian Hoo K M (Malaysia) Woon K W	16	21	21
(England) H Olver (England) L Smith	21	16	9

=== Bottom half ===
==== Section 3 ====
First Round
(Malaysia) A A Anscelly (Malaysia) Soong F C	5	10
(Bulgaria) G Stoeva (Bulgaria) S Stoeva	21	21
(England) S Brown (England) K Robertshaw	21	21
(Germany) I Herttrich (Germany) B Michels	15	18
(China) Tang YT (China) Yu Y	21	21
(United States) E Lee (United States) P L Obanana	13	10
(Germany) B Bellenberg (Germany) E Janssens	4	3
3	(Japan) N Fukuman (Japan) K Yonao	21	21

Second Round
(Bulgaria) G Stoeva (Bulgaria) S Stoeva	21	21
(England) S Brown (England) K Robertshaw	15	15
(China) Tang YT (China) Yu Y	21	21
3	(Japan) N Fukuman (Japan) K Yonao	18	19

Quarterfinals
(Bulgaria) G Stoeva (Bulgaria) S Stoeva	16	9
(China) Tang YT (China) Yu Y	21	21

==== Section 4 ====
First Round
(Germany) R Hacks (Germany) A Horbach	17	8
(France) A Fontaine (France) A Tran	21	21
(Thailand) J Kittiharakul (Thailand) R Prajongjai	21	21
(Chinese Taipei) Hsieh P-c (Chinese Taipei) Wu T-j	14	11
(Chinese Taipei) Chiang K-h (Chinese Taipei) Wu F-c	21	13	15
(Netherlands) S Barning (Netherlands) I Tabeling	16	21	21
BYE
2	(India) J Gutta (India) A Ponnappa

Second Round
(France) A Fontaine (France) A Tran	14	13
(Thailand) J Kittiharakul (Thailand) R Prajongjai	21	21
(Netherlands) S Barning (Netherlands) I Tabeling	23	13	26
2	(India) J Gutta (India) A Ponnappa	21	21	24

Quarterfinals
(Thailand) J Kittiharakul (Thailand) R Prajongjai	21	23
(Netherlands) S Barning (Netherlands) I Tabeling	15	21

== Mixed doubles ==
=== Seeds ===
1. (England) Chris Adcock / Gabrielle Adcock (final)
2. (Indonesia) Praveen Jordan / Debby Susanto (quarterfinals)
3. (Indonesia) Edi Subaktiar / Gloria Emanuelle Widjaja (first round)
4. (Germany) Michael Fuchs / Birgit Michels (quarterfinals)

=== Finals ===
Semifinals
1	(England) Chris Adcock (England) Gabrielle Adcock	21	21
(Netherlands) Jacco Arends (Netherlands) Selena Piek	14	13
(Russia) Vitalij Durkin (Russia) Nina Vislova	18	16
(Poland) Robert Mateusiak (Poland) Nadiezda Zieba	21	21

Final
1	(England) Chris Adcock (England) Gabrielle Adcock	18	17
(Poland) Robert Mateusiak (Poland) Nadiezda Zieba	21	21

=== Top half ===
==== Section 1 ====
First Round
1	(England) C Adcock (England) G Adcock
BYE
(Germany) R Domke (Germany) K Kattenbeck	13	9
(Japan) K Sonoda (Japan) N Fukuman	21	21
(France) R Labar (France) E Lefel	w/o
(Germany) P Kaesbauer (Germany) F Volkmann
(Malaysia) Chan P S (Malaysia) Goh L Y	21	21
(Ukraine) G Natarov (Ukraine) N Voytsekh	11	11

Second Round
1	(England) C Adcock (England) G Adcock	22	21
(Japan) K Sonoda (Japan) N Fukuman	20	18
(Germany) P Kaesbauer (Germany) F Volkmann	17	18
(Malaysia) Chan P S (Malaysia) Goh L Y	21	21

Quarterfinals
1	(England) C Adcock (England) G Adcock	21	15	21
(Malaysia) Chan P S (Malaysia) Goh L Y	13	21	12

==== Section 2 ====
First Round
3	(Indonesia) E Subaktiar (Indonesia) G E Widjaja	17	14
(Netherlands) J Arends (Netherlands) S Piek	21	21
(Germany) J R Jansen (Germany) C J Jansen	15	21	14
(Denmark) M Christiansen (Denmark) L Grebak	21	16	21
(Russia) R Kargaev (Russia) E Bolotova	21	15
(Germany) M Lamsfuss (Germany) I Herttrich	23	21
(Germany) M E Seidel (Germany) L Efler	13	14
(Chinese Taipei) Wu H-l (Chinese Taipei) Hsieh P-c	21	21

Second Round
(Netherlands) J Arends (Netherlands) S Piek	21	21
(Denmark) M Christiansen (Denmark) L Grebak	17	17
(Germany) M Lamsfuss (Germany) I Herttrich	19	21
(Chinese Taipei) Wu H-l (Chinese Taipei) Hsieh P-c	21	23

Quarterfinals
(Netherlands) J Arends (Netherlands) S Piek	21	20	21
(Chinese Taipei) Wu H-l (Chinese Taipei) Hsieh P-c	13	22	9

=== Bottom half ===
==== Section 3 ====
First Round
(Republic of Ireland) S Magee (Republic of Ireland) C Magee	15	18
(Russia) V Durkin (Russia) N Vislova	21	21
(Germany) D Benz (Germany) A Horbach	16	11
(Australia) R Middleton (Australia) L Choo	21	21
(Sweden) N Ruponen (Sweden) A Hogstrom	w/o
(Malaysia) Wong F Y (Malaysia) Chow M K
(France) G Mittelheisser (France) A Fontaine	w/o
4	(Germany) M Fuchs (Germany) B Michels

Second Round
(Russia) V Durkin (Russia) N Vislova	21	21
(Australia) R Middleton (Australia) L Choo	12	15
(Malaysia) Wong F Y (Malaysia) Chow M K	13	12
4	(Germany) M Fuchs (Germany) B Michels	21	21

Quarterfinals
(Russia) V Durkin (Russia) N Vislova	21	15	21
4	(Germany) M Fuchs (Germany) B Michels	17	21	13

==== Section 4 ====
First Round
(Germany) J Pistorius (Germany) E Janssens	12	11
(Poland) R Mateusiak (Poland) N Zieba	21	21
(England) M Nottingham (England) E Westwood	26	22
(Denmark) K Antonsen (Denmark) A Madsen	24	20
(Denmark) N Nohr (Denmark) S Thygesen	21	13	12
(Chinese Taipei) Lin C-y (Chinese Taipei) Wu T-j	15	21	21
(Germany) F M.Gustaf (Indonesia) A P L Variella	12	12
2	(Indonesia) P Jordan (Indonesia) D Susanto	21	21

Second Round
(Poland) R Mateusiak (Poland) N Zieba	21	21
(England) M Nottingham (England) E Westwood	15	11
(Chinese Taipei) Lin C-y (Chinese Taipei) Wu T-j	18	22
2	(Indonesia) P Jordan (Indonesia) D Susanto	21	24

Quarterfinals
(Poland) R Mateusiak (Poland) N Zieba	21	21
2	(Indonesia) P Jordan (Indonesia) D Susanto	13	19

Preceded by 2015 Chinese Taipei Masters Grand Prix	BWF Grand Prix and Grand Prix Gold; 2015 BWF Season	Succeeded by 2015 Korea Masters Grand Prix Gold
