= Pugach =

Pugach is a surname. Notable people with the surname include:

- Alina Pugach (born 1993), Israeli badminton player
- Burt Pugach (1927–2020), disbarred American lawyer, known for blinding his ex-mistress with lye and subsequently marrying her
- Leon Pugach (born 1972), Israeli badminton player
- Yuval Pugach (born 2001), Israeli badminton player
