= Nir Yusim =

Israeli badminton player (born 1978)

Nir Yusim ניר יוסים
Personal information
- Born: 17 January 1978 (age 48)
- Height: 1.85 m (6 ft 1 in)

Sport
- Country: Israel
- Sport: Badminton
- Handedness: Left
- Event: Men's singles & doubles

Men's singles & doubles
- BWF profile

Nir Yusim (Hebrew: ניר יוסים; born 17 January 1978) is an Israeli badminton player who won National Championships for 11 times.

== Achievements ==
=== IBF/BWF International ===
Men's singles
Year	Tournament	Opponent	Score	Result
1998	Cyprus International	(Bulgaria) Konstantin Dobrev	15–11, 4–15, 8–15	(silver) Runner-up
1999	Kenya International	(France) Bertrand Gallet	11–15, 9–15	(silver) Runner-up
1999	Cyprus International	(Greece) Theodoros Velkos	7–15, 7–15	(silver) Runner-up
2001	Cyprus International	(Greece) Theodoros Velkos	5–7, 4–7, 3–7	(silver) Runner-up
2001	Athens International	(Greece) Theodoros Velkos	7–3, 2–7, 2–7, ?, ?	(silver) Runner-up

Men's doubles
Year	Tournament	Partner	Opponent	Score	Result
1998	Israel International	(Lithuania) Aivaras Kvedarauskas	(Hungary) Richárd Bánhidi (Hungary) Tamás Hódos	15–7, 15–2	(gold) Winner
1999	Israel International	(Israel) Leon Pougatch	(Bulgaria) Boris Kessov (Bulgaria) Georgi Petrov	4–15, 4–15	(silver) Runner-up
2002	Cyprus International	(Israel) Alexander Bass	(Bulgaria) Julian Hristov (Bulgaria) Georgi Petrov	2–15, 3–15	(silver) Runner-up
2005	Cyprus International	(Israel) Alexander Bass	(Denmark) Daniel Damgaard-Pedersen (Denmark) Jesper Hovgaard	7–15, 3–15	(silver) Runner-up

Mixed doubles
Year	Tournament	Partner	Opponent	Score	Result
1998	Israel International	(Bulgaria) Diana Knekna	(Israel) Leon Pougatch (Israel) Svetlana Zilberman	4–15, 5–15	(silver) Runner-up
