= Jan Rudziński =

Polish badminton player (born 1982)

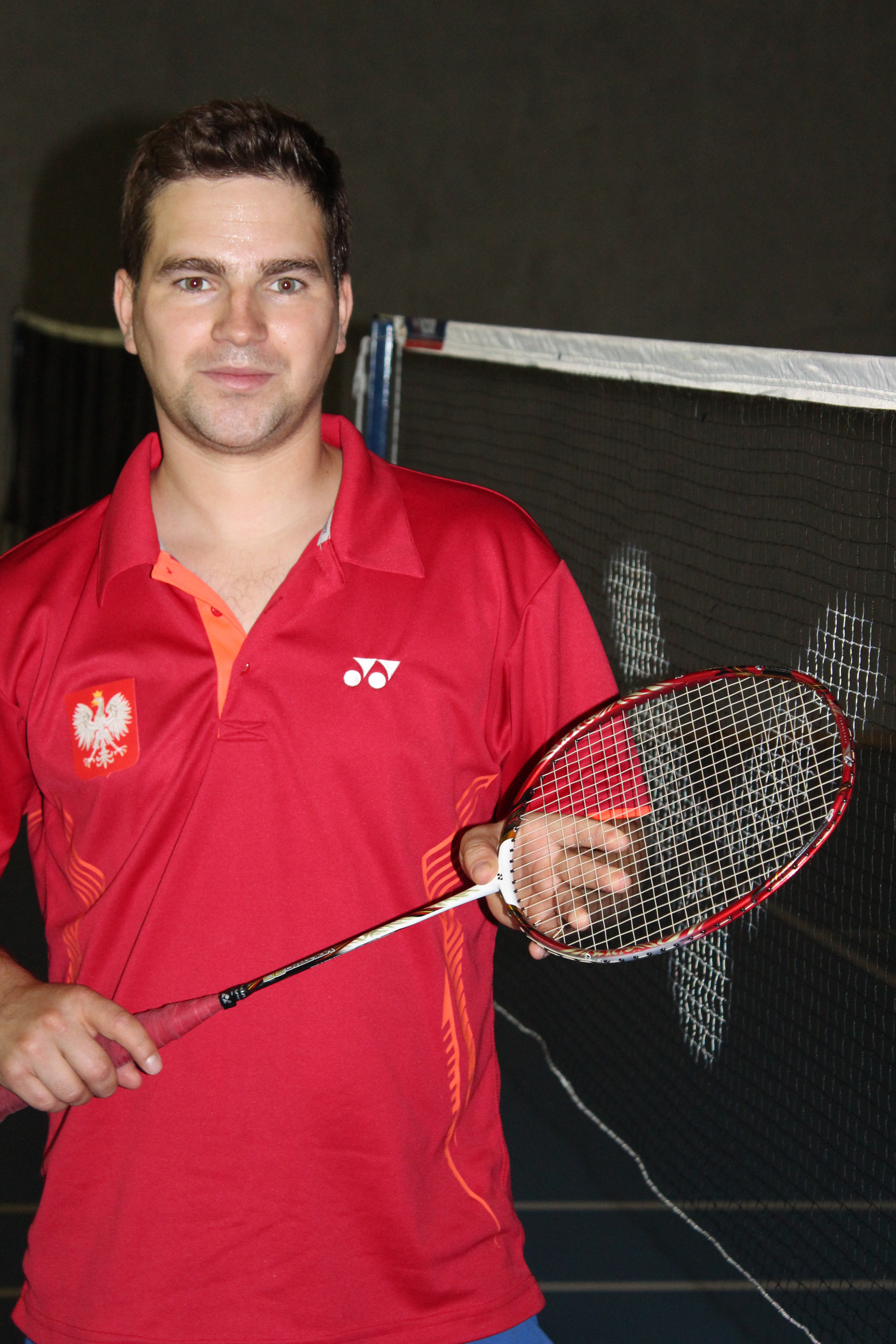

Personal information
- Born: 22 September 1982 (age 44) Warsaw, Poland
- Height: 1.69 m (5 ft 7 in)

Sport
- Country: Poland
- Sport: Badminton
- Handedness: Right

Men's & mixed doubles
- Highest ranking: 68 (MD 12 October 2017); 190 (XD 20 April 2017)
- BWF profile

Jan Rudziński (born 22 September 1982) is a Polish badminton player. Rudziński started playing badminton when he was seven at the AZS Warszawa, and a part of the Polish national team in 1998–2004. Rudziński was a champion at the 2017 Iceland International in the men's doubles event with partner Paweł Prądziński.

== Achievements ==
=== BWF International Challenge/Series (1 title, 4 runners-up) ===
Men's doubles
Year	Tournament	Partner	Opponent	Score	Result
2016	Hatzor International	(Poland) Paweł Prądziński	(Israel) Yonathan Levit (Israel) Ariel Shainski	17–21, 19–21	(silver) Runner-up
2016	Turkey International	(Poland) Paweł Prądziński	(France) Vanmael Hériau (France) Florent Riancho	10–21, 21–18, 11–21	(silver) Runner-up
2017	Iceland International	(Poland) Paweł Prądziński	(England) Zach Russ (England) Steven Stallwood	24–22, 10–21, 21–16	(gold) Winner
2019	Egypt International	(Poland) Paweł Pietryja	(Algeria) Koceila Mammeri (Algeria) Youcef Sabri Medel	19–21, 22–24	(silver) Runner-up
2019	Algeria International	(Poland) Paweł Pietryja	(Algeria) Koceila Mammeri (Algeria) Youcef Sabri Medel	16–21, 16–21	(silver) Runner-up

BWF International Challenge tournament
BWF International Series tournament
BWF Future Series tournament
