= Paweł Prądziński =

Polish badminton player (born 1991)

Personal information
- Born: 23 March 1991 (age 35) Koszalin, Poland
- Height: 1.86 m (6 ft 1 in)

Sport
- Country: Poland
- Sport: Badminton
- Handedness: Right

Men's singles & doubles
- Highest ranking: 221 (MS 20 April 2017); 68 (MD 12 October 2017)
- BWF profile

Paweł Prądziński (born 23 March 1991) is a Polish badminton player. He was a champion at the 2017 Iceland International in the men's doubles event with partner Jan Rudziński.

== Achievements ==
=== BWF International Challenge/Series ===
Men's singles
Year	Tournament	Opponent	Score	Result
2016	Hatzor International	(Czech Republic) Lukáš Zevl	18–21, 21–14, 13–21	(silver) Runner-up

Men's doubles
Year	Tournament	Partner	Opponent	Score	Result
2016	Hatzor International	(Poland) Jan Rudziński	(Israel) Yonathan Levit (Israel) Ariel Shainski	17–21, 19–21	(silver) Runner-up
2016	Turkey International	(Poland) Jan Rudziński	(France) Vanmael Hériau (France) Florent Riancho	10–21, 21–18, 11–21	(silver) Runner-up
2017	Iceland International	(Poland) Jan Rudziński	(England) Zach Russ (England) Steven Stallwood	24–22, 10–21, 21–16	(gold) Winner

BWF International Challenge tournament
BWF International Series tournament
BWF Future Series tournament
