= Lukáš Zevl =

Czech badminton player (born 1991)

Personal information
- Born: 25 October 1991 (age 35) České Budějovice, Czech Republic
- Height: 1.78 m (5 ft 10 in)
- Weight: 75 kg (165 lb)

Sport
- Country: Czech Republic
- Sport: Badminton
- Handedness: Left
- Coached by: Lennart Engler; Jakob Toft; Petr Martinec

Men's singles & doubles
- Highest ranking: 221 (MS 5 September 2013); 371 (MD 1 December 2011); 254 (XD 15 April 2010)
- BWF profile

Lukáš Zevl (born 25 October 1991) is a Czech badminton player. He was two times Hatzor International champions, winning the men's singles title in 2016 and the men's doubles title in 2018.

== Career ==
In 2014, Zevl participated at the European Men's Team Championships. At the 2012 and 2014 Czech Nationals, he won the bronze medal in the men's singles. In 2015, he finished as finalists in the Hatzor International, losing to Sam Parsons of England in straight games.

== Achievements ==
=== BWF International Challenge/Series ===
Men's singles
Year	Tournament	Opponent	Score	Result	Ref.
2015	Hatzor International	(England) Sam Parsons	22–20, 8–21, 8–21	(silver) Runner-up	
2016	Hatzor International	(Poland) Paweł Prądziński	21–18, 14–21, 21–13	(gold) Winner	

Men's doubles
Year	Tournament	Partner	Opponent	Score	Result	Ref.
2018	Hatzor International	(Israel) Ariel Shainski	(Slovenia) Andraž Krapež (Croatia) Filip Špoljarec	15–21, 21–15, 21–16	(gold) Winner	

BWF International Challenge tournament
BWF International Series tournament
BWF Future Series tournament
