= Dana Danilenko =

Israeli badminton player (born 2001)

Personal information
- Born: דנה דנילנקו; 19 July 2001 (age 24) Lod, Israel
- Height: 1.70 m (5 ft 7 in)

Sport
- Country: Israel
- Sport: Badminton
- Handedness: Right

Women's singles & doubles
- Highest ranking: 264 (WS 24 May 2018); 720 (WD 22 September 2016)
- Current ranking: 441 (WS 22 October 2019)
- BWF profile

Dana Danilenko (Hebrew: דנה דנילנקו; born 19 July 2001) is an Israeli badminton player. She started playing badminton at the age of eight, and in 2011 she won the Israel Junior International tournament. Danilenko captured her first national championships title in 2016.

== Achievements ==
=== BWF International Challenge/Series (3 runners-up) ===
Women's singles

Year	Tournament	Opponent	Score	Result
2019	Hatzor International	(Israel) Ksenia Polikarpova	15–21, 13–21	(silver) Runner-up

Women's doubles

Year	Tournament	Partner	Opponent	Score	Result
2015	Hatzor International	(Israel) Margeret Lurie	(Israel) Alina Pugach (Israel) Yuval Pugach	18–21, 20–22	(silver) Runner-up
2022	Israel Open	(Israel) Katsiaryna Zablotskaya	(Switzerland) Aline Müller (Switzerland) Caroline Racloz	11–21, 9–21	(silver) Runner-up

BWF International Challenge tournament
BWF International Series tournament
BWF Future Series tournament
