= Israel Open (badminton) =

Badminton open in Hatzor, Israel

The Israel Open, formerly called Hatzor International, in badminton is an international open held in Israel since 1975. It was held annually from 1975 to 1982, but between 1983 and 2005 the competition was held only thrice. The competition was resumed in 2006 under a new name Hatzor International, after the club which host the event at Kibbutz Hatzor. Israeli National Badminton Championships started in 1977.

== Previous winners ==
Year	Men's singles	Women's singles	Men's doubles	Women's doubles	Mixed doubles
1975	(Israel) Victor Yusim	No competition	(Israel) Victor Yusim (Israel) Michael Schneidman	No competition	
1976	(Israel) Michael Schneidman	(Netherlands) Tineke Hof	(Israel) Victor Yusim (Israel) Michael Schneidman	(Netherlands) Tineke Hof (Netherlands) Devora Geffen	No competition
1977	(Israel) Victor Yusim	(Sweden) Eva Unglick	(Israel) Victor Yusim (Israel) Michael Schneidman	(Sweden) Eva Unglick (Israel) Chaya Grunstein	No competition
1978	(Israel) Victor Yusim	(Israel) Chaya Grunstein	(Israel) Victor Yusim (Israel) Michael Schneidman	(Israel) Chaya Grunstein (Israel) Carole Silman	(Israel) Michael Rapaport (Israel) Carole Silman
1979	(Israel) Victor Yusim	(Sweden) Eva Unglick	(Israel) Victor Yusim (Israel) Michael Schneidman	(Sweden) Eva Unglick (Israel) Chaya Grunstein	(Israel) Nissim Duk (Israel) Eva Unglick
1980	(Israel) Yitzhak Serrouya	(West Germany) Elka Kalb	(Israel) Nissim Duk (Israel) Yitzhak Serrouya	(West Germany) Elka Kalb (Israel) Irit Ben Shushan	(Israel) Michael Rapaport (Israel) Eva Unglick
1981	(Austria) Johann Ratheyser	(Austria) Adelhid Losek	(Austria) Johann Rathyser (Austria) Gerard Hofegger	(Sweden) Eva Unglick (Israel) Irit Ben Shushan	(Austria) Johann Ratheyser (Austria) Adelheid Losek
1982	(England) Andrew Downes	(England) Lisa Salmon	(England) David Spurling (England) Stuart Spurling	(England) Lisa Salmon (England) J. Downes	(England) David Spurling (England) H. Blake
1983– 1989	No competition				
1990	(France) Stephane Renault	(France) Christelle Mol	(Portugal) Ricardo Fernandes (Portugal) Marco Vasconcelos	(France) Christelle Mol (France) Virginie Delvingt	(France) Stephane Renault (France) Elodie Mansuy
1991– 1997	No competition				
1998	(Lithuania) Aivaras Kvedarauskas	(Israel) Svetlana Zilberman	(Lithuania) Aivaras Kvedarauskas (Israel) Nir Yusim	(Israel) Svetlana Zilberman (Bulgaria) Diana Koleva	(Israel) Leon Pugatch (Israel) Svetlana Zilberman
1999	(Bulgaria) Boris Kessov	(Bulgaria) Neli Boteva	(Bulgaria) Boris Kessov (Bulgaria) Georgi Petrov	No competition	(Bulgaria) Ljuben Panov (Bulgaria) Diana Koleva
2000– 2005	No competition				
2006	(Czech Republic) Petr Koukal	(Slovenia) Maja Tvrdy	(Slovenia) Luka Petric (Slovenia) Mateuz Srekl	No competition	(Slovenia) Luka Petric (Slovenia) Maja Tvrdy
2007	(Japan) Sho Sasaki	(England) Tracey Hallam	(Germany) Jochen Cassel (Germany) Thomas Tesche	No competition	(Ukraine) Valeriy Atrashenkov (Ukraine) Elena Prus
2008– 2012	No competition				
2013	(Russia) Vladimir Malkov	(Portugal) Telma Santos	(Russia) Vladimir Malkov (Russia) Vadim Novoselov	(Russia) Olga Golovanova (Russia) Viktoriia Vorobeva	(Russia) Vladimir Malkov (Russia) Viktoriia Vorobeva
2014	(Ukraine) Artem Pochtarev	(Portugal) Telma Santos	(Ukraine) Gennadiy Natarov (Ukraine) Artem Pochtarev	No competition	(Ukraine) Gennadiy Natarov (Ukraine) Yuliya Kazarinova
2015	(England) Sam Parsons	(Czech Republic) Zuzana Pavelkova	(Israel) Alexander Bass (Israel) Daniel Chislov	(Israel) Alina Pugach (Israel) Yuval Pugach	(Israel) Ariel Shainski (Belarus) Krestina Silich
2016	(Czech Republic) Lukas Zevl	(Slovenia) Ana Marija Setina	(Israel) Yonathan Levit (Israel) Ariel Shainski	(Russia) Irina Shorokhova (Russia) Kristina Virvich	(Israel) Ariel Shainski (Belarus) Krestina Silich
2017	(Slovenia) Miha Ivanič	(Russia) Anastasiia Semenova	(Israel) Alexander Bass (Israel) Shai Geffen	(Russia) Ksenia Evgenova (Russia) Anastasiia Semenova	(Israel) Yonathan Levit (Russia) Yulia Vasilyeva
2018	(India) Kaushal Dharmamer	(Israel) Ksenia Polikarpova	(Israel) Ariel Shainski (Czech Republic) Lukas Zevl	(Israel) Ksenia Polikarpova (Belarus) Krestina Silich	(Ukraine) Mykhaylo Makhnovskiy (Ukraine) Anastasiya Prozorova
2019	(Germany) Felix Hammes	(Israel) Ksenia Polikarpova	(Germany) Felix Hammes (Germany) Christopher Klauer	(Israel) Heli Neiman (Israel) Ksenia Polikarpova	(Israel) May Bar Netzer (Israel) Shery Rotshtein
2020	Cancelled (Note: This tournament, originally to be played from 21 to 24 October, was later cancelled due to the COVID-19 pandemic in Israel.)				
2021	Cancelled (Note: This tournament, originally to be played from 27 to 30 October, was later cancelled due to the COVID-19 pandemic in Israel.)				
2022	(Germany) Matthias Kicklitz	(Switzerland) Dounia Pelupessy	(Italy) Giovanni Greco (Italy) David Salutt	(Switzerland) Aline Müller (Switzerland) Caroline Racloz	(Switzerland) Minh Quang Pham (Switzerland) Caroline Racloz
2023	Cancelled (Note: This tournament, originally to be played on 26–28 October, was later cancelled due to the Gaza war.)				
2024	Cancelled (Note: This tournament, originally to be played on 23–26 October, was later cancelled due to the Gaza war.)				
2025	Cancelled (Note: This tournament, originally to be played on 22–25 October, was later cancelled due to the Gaza war.)				

== Performances by nation ==
As of the 2022 edition

Rank	Nation	MS	WS	MD	WD	XD	Total
1	Israel	6	4	10	6	6.5	32.5
2	Russia	1	1	1	3	1.5	7.5
3	England	2	2	1	1	1	7
4	Germany	2	1	2	0.5		5.5
5	Slovenia	1	2	1		1	5
5	Ukraine	1		1		3	5
7	Bulgaria	1	1	1	0.5	1	4.5
8	Austria	1	1	1		1	4
8	France	1	1		1	1	4
10	Czech Republic	2	1	0.5			3.5
10	Sweden		2		1.5		3.5
12	Portugal		2	1			3
12	Switzerland		1		1	1	3
14	Netherlands		1		1		2
15	Belarus				0.5	1	1.5
15	Lithuania	1		0.5			1.5
17	India	1					1
17	Italy			1			1
17	Japan	1					1
Total		21	20	21	16	18	96
