= Yuval Pugach =

Israeli badminton player (born 2001)

Personal information
- Born: 'יובל פוגץ; 15 November 2001 (age 24)

Sport
- Country: Israel
- Sport: Badminton

Women's singles & doubles
- Highest ranking: 545 (WS 23 April 2019); 357 (WD 26 March 2019); 673 (XD 26 July 2018)
- Current ranking: 574 (WS), 357 (WD), 769 (XD) (22 October 2019)
- BWF profile

Yuval Pugach (Hebrew: 'יובל פוגץ; born 15 November 2001) is an Israeli badminton player.

She was the women's doubles champion at the 2015 Hatzor International, also won the National Championships titles partnered with Alina Pugach in 2016 and 2017. At the 2022 Maccabiah Games, she won a gold medal in mixed doubles and a silver medal in women's doubles.

== Achievements ==
=== BWF International Challenge/Series (1 title, 1 runner-up) ===
Women's doubles

Year	Tournament	Partner	Opponent	Score	Result
2019	Hatzor International	(Israel) Shery Rotshtein	(Israel) Heli Neiman (Israel) Ksenia Polikarpova	15–21, 9–21	(silver) Runner-up
2015	Hatzor International	(Israel) Alina Pugach	(Israel) Dana Danilenko (Israel) Margeret Lurie	21–18, 22–20	(gold) Winner

BWF International Challenge tournament
BWF International Series tournament
BWF Future Series tournament
