= Artem Pochtarov =

Ukrainian badminton player

Artem Pochtaryov
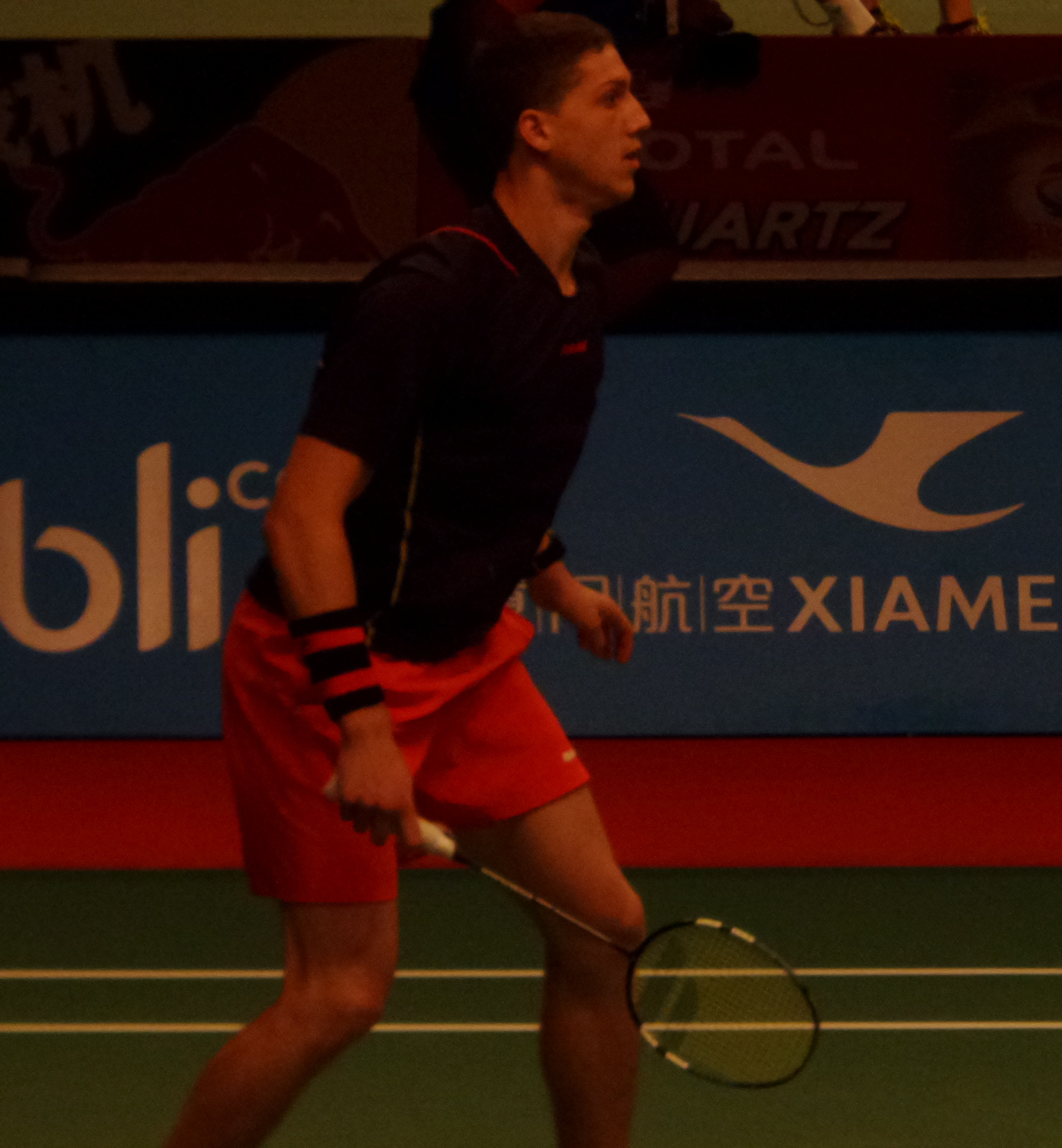
- Artem Pochtarev at the 2015 BWF World Championships

Personal information
- Born: Артем Сергійович Почтарьов; July 24, 1993 (age 33) Lysychansk, Ukraine
- Height: 1.83 m (6 ft 0 in)

Sport
- Country: Ukraine
- Sport: Badminton
- Handedness: Right
- Coached by: Gennadiy Makhnovskiy
- Highest ranking: 57 (MS) (15 December 2016)
- Current ranking: 119 (MS), 381 (XD) (25 June 2019)
- BWF profile
Medal record
Men's badminton
Representing Ukraine
European Junior Championships
Bronze medal – third place	2011 Vantaa	Mixed team

Artem Sergiyovich Pochtaryov (Ukrainian: Артем Сергійович Почтарьов; born 24 July 1993) is a Ukrainian badminton player. His current partner for men's doubles is Gennadiy Natarov. Pochtarev competed in 2015 BWF World Championships, where he was defeated by Sho Sasaki in the first round.

== Career achievements ==
Men's singles

Year	Championship	Opponent	Score
2014	Hatzor International	(Bulgaria) Blagovest Kisyov	retired

Men's doubles with Gennadiy Natarov

Year	Championship	Opponent	Score
2014	Hatzor International	(Israel) Alexander Bass (Israel) Lior Kroyter	11-5, 11-10, 11-10
2014	Kharkiv International	(Ukraine) Vitaly Konov (Ukraine) Dmytro Zavadsky	11-6, 11-8, 11-9

Mixed doubles with Elena Prus

Year	Championship	Opponent	Score
2014	Kharkiv International	(Ukraine) Valeriy Atrashchenkov (Ukraine) Yelyzaveta Zharka	10-11, 11-7, 11-10, 11-6

Notes

Commonwealth Youth Games tournament
BWF International Series tournament
