= Yonathan Levit =

Israeli badminton player (born 1997)

Personal information
- Born: יונתן לויט; 15 November 1997 (age 28)

Sport
- Country: Israel
- Sport: Badminton

Men's singles & doubles
- Highest ranking: 235 (MS 2 February 2021); 167 (MD with Shai Geffen 30 April 2019)
- BWF profile

Yonathan Levit (Hebrew: יונתן לויט; born 15 November 1997) is an Israeli badminton player. He won a silver medal at the 2017 Maccabiah Games.

== Career ==
Hailing from Binyamina, Levit started to playing badminton at the age of eight introduced by his parents. Both of his parents came from Russia. His first major title in Israel was the National U11 champion. He won the Hatzor International in the men's doubles event in 2016 and in the mixed doubles in 2017. In 2021, he trained in the Centre of Excellence based in Denmark toobtain his badminton career.

== Achievements ==
=== BWF International Challenge/Series ===
Men's doubles
Year	Tournament	Partner	Opponent	Score	Result
2016	Hatzor International	(Israel) Ariel Shainski	(Poland) Paweł Prądziński (Poland) Jan Rudziński	21–17, 21–19	(gold) Winner

Mixed doubles
Year	Tournament	Partner	Opponent	Score	Result
2017	Hatzor International	(Russia) Yulia Vasilyeva	(Poland) Maciej Ociepa (Poland) Agnieszka Foryta	19–21, 15–21, 30–28	(gold) Winner

BWF International Challenge tournament
BWF International Series tournament
BWF Future Series tournament
