= Daniel Chislov =

Israeli badminton player (born 1995)

Personal information
- Born: דניאל צ'יסלוב; 1 May 1995 (age 31)

Sport
- Country: Israel
- Sport: Badminton

Men's singles & doubles
- Highest ranking: 178 (MS 10 May 2018); 244 (MD 2 June 2016); 366 (XD 30 August 2018)
- Current ranking: 330 (MS 9 July 2019); 455 (MD 9 July 2019); 395 (XD 9 July 2019)
- BWF profile

Daniel Chislov (Hebrew: דניאל צ'יסלוב; born 1 May 1995) is an Israeli badminton player.

He won a gold medal at the 2017 Maccabiah Games.

== Achievements ==
=== BWF International Challenge/Series ===
Men's singles
Year	Tournament	Opponent	Score	Result
2017	Czech International	(Czech Republic) Milan Ludík	19–21, 15–21	(silver) Runner-up

Men's doubles
Year	Tournament	Partner	Opponent	Score	Result
2015	Hatzor International	(Israel) Alexander Bass	(Israel) Leon Pugach (Israel) Aviv Sade	21–14, 23–21	(gold) Winner

BWF International Challenge tournament
BWF International Series tournament
BWF Future Series tournament
