= Gennadiy Natarov =

Ukrainian badminton player

Personal information
- Born: Генадій Вадимович Натаров; 23 January 1992 (age 34) Kharkiv, Ukraine
- Height: 1.93 m (6 ft 4 in)
- Weight: 85 kg (187 lb)

Sport
- Country: Ukraine
- Sport: Badminton
- Handedness: Right
- Coached by: Gennadiy Makhnovskiy

Men's & mixed doubles
- Highest ranking: 64 (MD 17 September 2015); 61 (XD 10 September 2015)
- BWF profile
Medal record
Men's badminton
Representing Ukraine
European Junior Championships
Bronze medal – third place	2011 Vantaa	Mixed team

Gennadiy Vadymovych Natarov (Ukrainian: Генадій Вадимович Натаров; born 23 January 1992) is a Ukrainian badminton player.

== Career ==
Natarov started playing badminton at badminton club in KPI, and made his international debut at Poland in 2006. In 2013, he competed at the Summer Universiade in Kazan, Russia. In 2014, he won Hatzor Israel International tournament in the men's and mixed doubles events, then became the runner-up of the Polish International tournament in the mixed doubles event.

== Achievements ==
=== BWF International Challenge/Series ===
Men's doubles
Year	Tournament	Partner	Opponent	Score	Result
2014	Hatzor International	(Ukraine) Artem Pochtarev	(Israel) Alexander Bass (Israel) Lior Kroyter	11–5, 11–10, 11–10	(gold) Winner
2014	Kharkiv International	(Ukraine) Artem Pochtarev	(Ukraine) Vitaly Konov (Ukraine) Dmytro Zavadsky	11–6, 11–8, 11–9	(gold) Winner

Mixed doubles
Year	Tournament	Partner	Opponent	Score	Result
2014	Hatzor International	(Ukraine) Yuliya Kazarinova	(France) Florent Riancho (Mauritius) Kate Foo Kune	11–6, 11–7, 8–11, 11–10	(gold) Winner
2014	Polish International	(Ukraine) Yuliya Kazarinova	(Poland) Robert Mateusiak (Poland) Agnieszka Wojtkowska	9–11, 7–11, 4–11	(silver) Runner-up

BWF International Challenge tournament
BWF International Series tournament
BWF Future Series tournament
