= Alexander Bass =

Israeli badminton player

Personal information
- Nickname: Alex
- Born: אלכסנדר בס

Sport
- Country: Israel
- Sport: Badminton

Men's singles & doubles
- Highest ranking: 119 (MD 10 May 2018)
- Current ranking: 449 (MD 25 June 2018)
- BWF profile

Alexander Bass (Hebrew: אלכסנדר בס) is an Israeli badminton player. In 2014, he became the men's doubles runner-up of the Hatzor International tournament, then in 2015 he became the champion. At the 2022 Maccabiah Games, he won a silver medal in men's doubles.

== Achievements ==
=== BWF International Challenge/Series ===
Men's doubles
Year	Tournament	Partner	Opponent	Score	Result
2017	Hatzor International	(Israel) Shai Geffen	(Russia) Dmitry Dubovenko (Russia) Andrei Klimenkov	21–17, 21–16	(gold) Winner
2015	Hatzor International	(Israel) Daniel Chislov	(Israel) Leon Pugach (Israel) Aviv Sade	21–14, 23–21	(gold) Winner
2014	Hatzor International	(Israel) Lior Kroyter	(Ukraine) Gennadiy Natarov (Ukraine) Artem Pochtarev	5–11, 10–11, 10–11	(silver) Runner-up

BWF International Challenge tournament
BWF International Series tournament
BWF Future Series tournament
