= Ariel Shainski =

Israeli badminton player (born 1993)

Ariel Shainski אריאל שאינסקי
Personal information
- Born: 2 April 1993 (age 33)

Sport
- Country: Israel
- Sport: Badminton

Men's singles & doubles
- Highest ranking: 458 (MS, 5 June 2014); 475 (MD, 25 June 2019); 277 (XD, 25 June 2015)
- BWF profile

Ariel Shainski (Hebrew: אריאל שאינסקי; born 2 April 1993) is an Israeli badminton player.

== Achievements ==
=== BWF International Challenge/Series ===
Men's doubles
Year	Tournament	Partner	Opponent	Score	Result
2016	Hatzor International	(Israel) Yonathan Levit	(Poland) Paweł Prądziński (Poland) Jan Rudziński	21–17, 21–19	(gold) Winner
2018	Hatzor International	(Czech Republic) Lukáš Zevl	(Slovenia) Andraž Krapež (Croatia) Filip Špoljarec	15–21, 21–15, 21–16	(gold) Winner

Mixed doubles
Year	Tournament	Partner	Opponent	Score	Result
2015	Hatzor International	(Belarus) Kristina Silich	(Israel) Lior Kroyter (Israel) Dana Kugel	21–10, 21–3	(gold) Winner
2016	Hatzor International	(Belarus) Kristina Silich	(Russia) Aleksandr Vasilkin (Russia) Kristina Virvich	19–21, 21–18, 21–13	(gold) Winner

BWF International Challenge tournament
BWF International Series tournament
BWF Future Series tournament
