= Alina Pugach =

Israeli badminton player (born 1993)

Personal information
- Born: אלינה פוגץ; 11 January 1993 (age 33)

Sport
- Country: Israel
- Sport: Badminton

Women's singles & doubles
- Highest ranking: 346 (WS 5 May 2011); 267 (WD 24 March 2011); 277 (XD 25 June 2015)
- BWF profile

Alina Pugach (Hebrew: אלינה פוגץ; born 11 January 1993) is an Israeli badminton player.

== Achievements ==
=== BWF International Challenge/Series ===
Women's doubles

Year	Tournament	Partner	Opponent	Score	Result
2015	Hatzor International	(Israel) Yuval Pugach	(Israel) Dana Danilenko (Israel) Margeret Lurie	21–18, 22–20	(gold) Winner

BWF International Challenge tournament
BWF International Series tournament
BWF Future Series tournament
