= Ksenia Polikarpova =

Israeli badminton player

Ksenia Polikarpova קסניה פוליקרפובה
Personal information
- Born: Ksenia Olegovna Polikarpova (Ксения Олеговна Поликарпова); 11 March 1990 (age 36) Leningrad, Soviet Union
- Height: 1.72 m (5 ft 8 in)
- Weight: 65 kg (143 lb)

Sport
- Country: Russia (until 2017); Israel (2017–present)
- Sport: Badminton
- Handedness: Right

Women's singles & doubles
- Highest ranking: 43 (WS 3 September 2015); 38 (WD 9 January 2014); 219 (XD 5 July 2018)
- BWF profile
Medal record
Women's badminton
Representing Russia
European Mixed Team Championships
Bronze medal – third place	2011 Amsterdam	Mixed team
Bronze medal – third place	2013 Moscow	Mixed team
Bronze medal – third place	2015 Leuven	Mixed team
European Women's Team Championships
Silver medal – second place	2010 Warsaw	Women's team
European Junior Championships
Bronze medal – third place	2009 Milan	Women's doubles

Ksenia Olegovna Polikarpova (Russian: Ксения Олеговна Поликарпова, Hebrew: קסניה פוליקרפובה; born 11 March 1990) is a Russian-Israeli Olympic badminton player.

In 2009, she won a bronze medal at the European Junior Championships in Milan, Italy. She also won bronze medals at the European Mixed Team Badminton Championships in 2011, 2013, and 2015 with Russian national badminton team.

Polikarpova became an Israeli citizen in May 2017, and won a gold medal in 2017 Maccabiah Games. She competed at the Tokyo 2020 Summer Olympics, competing in women's singles, coming in 15th. At the 2022 Maccabiah Games, she won a gold medal in women's doubles and a silver medal in women's singles.

== Achievements ==
=== European Junior Championships ===
Girls' doubles
Year	Venue	Partner	Opponent	Score	Result
2009	Federal Technical Centre - Palabadminton; Milan, Italy	(Russia) Elena Komendrovskaja	(Netherlands) Selena Piek (Netherlands) Iris Tabeling	19–21, 15–21	Bronze

=== BWF Grand Prix (3 runners-up) ===
The BWF Grand Prix had two levels, the Grand Prix and Grand Prix Gold. It was a series of badminton tournaments sanctioned by the Badminton World Federation (BWF) and played between 2007 and 2017.

Women's singles
Year	Tournament	Opponent	Score	Result
2013	Russian Open	(Japan) Aya Ohori	5–21, 10–21	(silver) Runner-up

Women's doubles
Year	Tournament	Partner	Opponent	Score	Result
2013	Russian Open	(Russia) Irina Khlebko	(Russia) Anastasia Chervyakova (Russia) Nina Vislova	16–21, 18–21	(silver) Runner-up
2016	Russian Open	(Russia) Evgeniya Kosetskaya	(Russia) Anastasia Chervyakova (Russia) Olga Morozova	14–21, 20–22	(silver) Runner-up

BWF Grand Prix Gold tournament
BWF Grand Prix tournament

=== BWF International Challenge/Series (13 titles, 10 runners-up) ===
Women's singles
Year	Tournament	Opponent	Score	Result
2013	Portugal International	(Russia) Ella Diehl	21–16, 16–21, 19–21	(silver) Runner-up
2017	Estonian International	(France) Delphine Lansac	15–21, 14–21	(silver) Runner-up
2017	Iran Fajr International	(Singapore) Grace Chua	9–11, 11–4, 11–5, 11–3	(gold) Winner
2017	Zambia International	(Mauritius) Kate Foo Kune	21–14, 16–21, 18–21	(silver) Runner-up
2018	Estonian International	(Denmark) Michelle Skødstrup	21–13, 21–17	(gold) Winner
2018	Ghana International	(Mauritius) Aurélie Allet	21–5, 21–5	(gold) Winner
2018	Lagos International	(India) Sri Krishna Priya Kudaravalli	20–22, 21–16, 27–25	(gold) Winner
2018	Hatzor International	(Slovenia) Lia Šalehar	21–15, 21–12	(gold) Winner
2019	Jamaica International	(Wales) Jordan Hart	21–23, 18–21	(silver) Runner-up
2019	Hatzor International	(Israel) Dana Danilenko	21–15, 21–13	(gold) Winner
2022	Mexican International	(United States) Lauren Lam	7–21, 13–21	(silver) Runner-up
2023	Tajikistan International	(India) Anupama Upadhyaya	21–19, 9–21, 8–21	(silver) Runner-up
2023	Cameroon International	(Azerbaijan) Keisha Fatimah Azzahra	14–21, 16–21	(silver) Runner-up

Women's doubles
Year	Tournament	Partner	Opponent	Score	Result
2009	Estonian International	(Russia) Irina Khlebko	(China) Cai Jiani (China) Bo Rong	13–21, 15–21	(silver) Runner-up
2009	Hungarian International	(Russia) Irina Khlebko	(Russia) Tatjana Bibik (Russia) Olga Golovanova	16–21, 21–17, 13–21	(silver) Runner-up
2013	Estonian International	(Russia) Irina Khlebko	(Denmark) Julie Finne-Ipsen (Denmark) Rikke Søby Hansen	15–21, 21–19, 22–20	(gold) Winner
2013	Romanian International	(Russia) Irina Khlebko	(Ukraine) Natalya Voytsekh (Ukraine) Yelyzaveta Zharka	21–18, 23–21	(gold) Winner
2013	Croatian International	(Russia) Irina Khlebko	(Denmark) Julie Finne-Ipsen (Denmark) Rikke Søby Hansen	21–19, 21–19	(gold) Winner
2013	Lithuanian International	(Russia) Irina Khlebko	(Netherlands) Alida Chen (Netherlands) Gayle Mahulette	21–10, 21–13	(gold) Winner
2015	Kazakhstan International	(Russia) Tatjana Bibik	(Iran) Negin Amiripour (Iran) Aghaei Hajiagha Soraya	21–14, 21–12	(gold) Winner
2018	Hatzor International	(Belarus) Krestina Silich	(Slovenia) Iza Šalehar (Slovenia) Lia Šalehar	21–16, 23–25, 22–20	(gold) Winner
2019	Hatzor International	(Israel) Heli Neiman	(Israel) Yuval Pugach (Israel) Shery Rotshtein	21–15, 21–9	(gold) Winner

Mixed doubles
Year	Tournament	Partner	Opponent	Score	Result
2009	Estonian International	(Russia) Andrey Ashmarin	(China) Zhang Yi (China) Cai Jiani	9–21, 14–21	(silver) Runner-up

BWF International Challenge tournament
BWF International Series tournament
BWF Future Series tournament
