= Leon Pugach =

Israeli badminton player

Leon Pugach 'ליאון פוגץ
Personal information
- Born: 11 April 1972 (age 54)

Sport
- Country: Israel
- Sport: Badminton

Men's & mixed doubles
- Highest ranking: 564 (MD) 22 Sep 2016; 745 (XD) 6 Nov 2014
- BWF profile

Leon Pugach (Hebrew: 'ליאון פוגץ; born 11 April 1972) is an Israeli male badminton player.

== Achievements ==
=== BWF International Challenge/Series ===
Men's Doubles
| Year | Tournament | Partner | Opponent | Score | Result |
|---|---|---|---|---|---|
| 2015 | Hatzor International | (Israel) Aviv Sade | (Israel) Alexander Bass (Israel) Daniel Chislov | 14-21, 21–23 | (silver) Runner-up |

BWF International Challenge tournament
BWF International Series tournament
BWF Future Series tournament
