= 2015 U.S. Open Grand Prix Gold =

Tournament details
- Dates: June 16, 2015 - June 21, 2015
- Level: Grand Prix Gold
- Total prize money: US$120,000
- Venue: Suffolk County Community College
- Location: New York, United States

Champions
- Men's singles: (Malaysia) Lee Chong Wei
- Women's singles: (Japan) Nozomi Okuhara
- Men's doubles: (China) Li Junhui (China) Liu Yuchen
- Women's doubles: (China) Yu Yang (China) Zhong Qianxin
- Mixed doubles: (China) Huang Kaixiang (China) Huang Dongping

The 2015 U.S. Open Grand Prix Gold is the seventh grand prix gold and grand prix tournament of the 2015 BWF Grand Prix Gold and Grand Prix. The tournament will be held in Suffolk County Community College, New York, United States June 16 until June 21, 2015, and has a total purse of $120,000.

== Players by nation ==
Nation	First round	Second round	Third round	Quarterfinals	Semifinals	Final
(United States)	15	2				
(Brazil)	9	1				
(Canada)	8	1		1		
(Chinese Taipei)	8	8	1	3		
(Australia)	5			1		
(India)	5				2	1
(China)	4		3	1		
(Japan)	3	7	1	5	5	1
(Czech Republic)	3	1				
(France)	3	1				
(Dominican Republic)	3					
(Denmark)	2	2				1
(Sweden)	2	2				
(Turkey)	2	1				
(Malaysia)	2					
(Switzerland)	2					
(Hong Kong)	1	5	1	2		1
(Germany)	1	4		2		
(England)	1	2		2		
(Netherlands)	1	1		1	1	
(Spain)	1	1				
(Finland)	1					
(Norway)	1					
(Indonesia)	1					
(Uganda)	1					
(Austria)	1					
(Scotland)		1		1		
(Thailand)		1		1		
(Poland)		2				
(Sri Lanka)		1				

== Men's singles ==
=== Seeds ===
1. (Chinese Taipei) Chou Tien-chen (semi-final)
2. (Denmark) Viktor Axelsen (withdrew)
3. (Denmark) Hans-Kristian Vittinghus (final)
4. (Japan) Sho Sasaki (first round)
5. (Germany) Marc Zwiebler (withdrew)
6. (Indonesia) Dionysius Hayom Rumbaka (withdrew)
7. (China) Xue Song (second round)
8. (Chinese Taipei) Hsu Jen-hao (third round)
9. (Japan) Takuma Ueda (quarter-final)
10. (Hong Kong) Wong Wing Ki (third round)
11. (England) Rajiv Ouseph (quarter-final)
12. (Hong Kong) Ng Ka Long (quarter-final)
13. (Japan) Kazumasa Sakai (first round)
14. (India) Ajay Jayaram (third round)
15. (Japan) Riichi Takeshita (third round)
16. (India) Sai Praneeth (semi-final)

=== Finals ===
Quarterfinals
1	(Chinese Taipei) Chou Tien-chen	21	21
9	(Japan) Takuma Ueda	11	19
3	(Denmark) Hans-Kristian Vittinghus	21	21
(Japan) Kenta Nishimoto	10	16
12	(Hong Kong) Ng Ka Long	8	14
16	(India) Sai Praneeth	21	21
(Malaysia) Lee Chong Wei	21	21
11	(England) Rajiv Ouseph	9	14

Semifinals
1	(Chinese Taipei) Chou Tien-chen	21	11	13
3	(Denmark) Hans-Kristian Vittinghus	12	21	21
16	(India) Sai Praneeth	9	17
(Malaysia) Lee Chong Wei	21	21

Final
3	(Denmark) Hans-Kristian Vittinghus	20	12
(Malaysia) Lee Chong Wei	22	21

=== Top half ===
==== Section 1 ====
First round
1	(Chinese Taipei) Chou T-c	21	18	21
(Finland) A Kaisti	11	21	16
Q8	(Canada) B. R. Sankeerth	10	18
(Sweden) H Hurskainen	21	21
14	(India) A Jayaram	21	21
(United States) H Shu	19	11
(Australia) D Guda	10	11
(Czech Republic) J Fröhlich	21	21

Second round
1	(Chinese Taipei) Chou T-c	21	21
(Sweden) H Hurskainen	19	14
14	(India) A Jayaram	21	21
(Czech Republic) J Fröhlich	9	7

Third round
1	(Chinese Taipei) Chou T-c	21	21
14	(India) A Jayaram	18	19

==== Section 2 ====
First round
PFQ	(Indonesia) N Sulistyo	11	8
(India) R.M.V.Gurusaidutt	21	21
(Canada) M Giuffre	17	15
(India) A Pawar	21	21
9	(Japan) T Ueda	21	21
Q5	(Dominican Republic) W Cabrera	7	5
(Norway) M Myhre	21	8	9
(Brazil) Y Oliveira	19	21	21

Second round
(India) R.M.V.Gurusaidutt	18	21	22
(India) A Pawar	21	11	20
9	(Japan) T Ueda	21	19	21
(Brazil) Y Oliveira	10	21	14

Third round
(India) R.M.V.Gurusaidutt	20	21	16
9	(Japan) T Ueda	22	13	21

==== Section 3 ====
First round
3	(Denmark) H Vittinghus	19	21	25
(Malaysia) Z Zulkiffli	21	14	23
Q2	(United States) T Pojanakanokporn	9	14
(England) T Penty	21	21
10	(Hong Kong) Wong WK	21	21
(Brazil) A Tjong	18	12
(Czech Republic) M Ludík	15	17
(England) A Smith	21	21

Second round
3	(Denmark) H Vittinghus	21	21
(England) T Penty	13	8
10	(Hong Kong) Wong WK	21	21
(England) A Smith	11	18

Third round
3	(Denmark) H Vittinghus	21	21
10	(Hong Kong) Wong WK	12	15

==== Section 4 ====
First round
7	(China) Xue S	21	21
(Denmark) J Persson	13	17
(Japan) K Nishimoto	21	21
Q1	(United States) A Shekhtman	8	7
15	(Japan) R Takeshita	21	21
(Spain) E Velázquez	19	17
(Sri Lanka) N Karunaratne	21	21
(Uganda) E Ekiring	12	12

Second round
7	(China) Xue S	16	15
(Japan) K Nishimoto	21	21
15	(Japan) R Takeshita	21	21
(Sri Lanka) N Karunaratne	12	13

Third round
(Japan) K Nishimoto	21	21
15	(Japan) R Takeshita	13	10

=== Bottom half ===
==== Section 5 ====
First round
(United States) S Pongnairat	9	19
(Chinese Taipei) Wang T-w	21	21
Q4	(China) Shi YQ	15	21	22
12	(Hong Kong) Ng KL	21	15	24
(Chinese Taipei) Lin Y-h	21	21
(Dominican Republic) N Javier	14	10
Q6	(United States) E Wu	16	13
8	(Chinese Taipei) Hsu J-h	21	21

Second round
(Chinese Taipei) Wang T-w	21	14	12
12	(Hong Kong) Ng KL	13	21	21
(Chinese Taipei) Lin Y-h	21	14	19
8	(Chinese Taipei) Hsu J-h	15	21	21

Third round
12	(Hong Kong) Ng KL	21	21
8	(Chinese Taipei) Hsu J-h	13	10

==== Section 6 ====
First round
(Denmark) C Thomsen	21	21
PFQ	(Czech Republic) A Mendrek	17	16
Q7	(United States) N Waller	11	12
16	(India) S Praneeth	21	21
Q3	(United States) R Chew	6	5
(Poland) A Dziolko	21	21
(China) Huang YX	21	21
4	(Japan) S Sasaki	16	13

Second round
(Denmark) C Thomsen	21	9	10
16	(India) S Praneeth	13	21	21
(Poland) A Dziolko	10	18
(China) Huang YX	21	21

Third round
16	(India) S Praneeth	21	16	21
(China) Huang YX	17	21	18

==== Section 7 ====
First round
(Austria) M Almer	5	16
(Denmark) R Fladberg	21	21
(Malaysia) Lee CW	21	21
13	(Japan) K Sakai	14	13
(Thailand) S Thammasin	21	21
(Brazil) D Paiola	3	16
PFQ	(China) Guo K	15	21	21
PFQ	(Chinese Taipei) Yang C-c	21	12	11

Second round
(Denmark) R Fladberg	13	11
(Malaysia) Lee CW	21	21
(Thailand) S Thammasin	17	17
PFQ	(China) Guo K	21	21

Third round
(Malaysia) Lee CW	21	22
PFQ	(China) Guo K	17	20

==== Section 8 ====
First round
PFQ	(Japan) K Tsuneyama	21	21
(Canada) L Couture	7	11
PFQ	(Australia) P Low	4	12
11	(England) R Ouseph	21	21
(Czech Republic) P Koukal	21	15	15
(Denmark) F Quach	18	21	21
(Sweden) M Borg	21	12	20
PFQ	(China) Zhu SY	15	21	22

Second round
PFQ	(Japan) K Tsuneyama	11	18
11	(England) R Ouseph	21	21
(Denmark) F Quach	15	17
PFQ	(China) Zhu SY	21	21

Third round
11	(England) R Ouseph	21	21
PFQ	(China) Zhu SY	11	8

== Women's singles ==
=== Seeds ===
1. (Japan) Nozomi Okuhara (champion)
2. (Japan) Akane Yamaguchi (semi-final)
3. (United States) Zhang Beiwen (second round)
4. (Japan) Sayaka Takahashi (semi-final)
5. (Canada) Michelle Li (first round)
6. (Japan) Minatsu Mitani (quarter-final)
7. (Spain) Beatriz Corrales (second round)
8. (Chinese Taipei) Pai Yu-po (second round)

=== Finals ===
Semifinals
1	(Japan) Nozomi Okuhara	21	21
4	(Japan) Sayaka Takahashi	18	10
(Japan) Sayaka Sato	22	21	21
2	(Japan) Akane Yamaguchi	24	11	8

Final
1	(Japan) Nozomi Okuhara	21	21
(Japan) Sayaka Sato	16	14

=== Top half ===
==== Section 1 ====
First round
1	(Japan) N Okuhara	21	21
(Brazil) L Vicente	5	15
(Japan) A Ohori	21	17	21
Q2	(China) Li Y	19	21	14
6	(Japan) M Mitani	12	21	21
(Germany) K Schnaase	21	15	13
(Japan) Y Hashimoto	21	21
PFQ	(India) S Rane	17	11

Second round
1	(Japan) N Okuhara	22	21
(Japan) A Ohori	20	10
6	(Japan) M Mitani	17	21	21
(Japan) Y Hashimoto	21	12	18

Quarterfinals
1	(Japan) N Okuhara	21	21
6	(Japan) M Mitani	8	15

==== Section 2 ====
First round
4	(Japan) S Takahashi	21	21
(United States) I Wang	18	15
(Chinese Taipei) Cheng C-y	22	16	21
(United States) R Schafer	20	21	18
5	(Canada) M Li	20	22
(Hong Kong) Cheung NY	22	24
(Switzerland) S Jaquet	19	26	12
(Chinese Taipei) Hsu Y-c	21	24	21

Second round
4	(Japan) S Takahashi	21	21
(Chinese Taipei) Cheng C-y	16	18
(Hong Kong) Cheung NY	21	21
(Chinese Taipei) Hsu Y-c	17	13

Quarterfinals
4	(Japan) S Takahashi	21	22
(Hong Kong) Cheung NY	17	20

=== Bottom half ===
==== Section 3 ====
First round
Q4	(China) Shen YY	21	21
(United States) J Subandhi	15	12
Q1	(Australia) W Chen	19	10
7	(Spain) B Corrales	21	21
(Japan) S Sato	21	21
(India) P Thulasi	15	6
Q3	(Turkey) O Bayrak	12	14
3	(United States) Zhang BW	21	21

Second round
Q4	(China) Shen YY	21	19	22
7	(Spain) B Corrales	12	21	20
(Japan) S Sato	21	21
3	(United States) Zhang BW	19	14

Quarterfinals
Q4	(China) Shen YY	7	21	9
(Japan) S Sato	21	8	21

==== Section 4 ====
First round
(Brazil) F Silva	12	15
(Scotland) K Gilmour	21	21
(England) F Chapman	10	21
8	(Chinese Taipei) Pai Y-p	21	23
(Japan) K Imabeppu	21	16	21
(Canada) R Honderich	5	21	6
(Turkey) N Yigit	20	18
2	(Japan) A Yamaguchi	22	21

Second round
(Scotland) K Gilmour	21	17	21
8	(Chinese Taipei) Pai Y-p	11	21	14
(Japan) K Imabeppu	13	20
2	(Japan) A Yamaguchi	21	22

Quarterfinals
(Scotland) K Gilmour	23	13	16
2	(Japan) A Yamaguchi	21	21	21

== Men's doubles ==
=== Seeds ===
1. (Japan) Hiroyuki Endo / Kenichi Hayakawa (withdrew)
2. (Japan) Hirokatsu Hashimoto / Noriyasu Hirata (second round)
3. (Denmark) Kim Astrup / Anders Skaarup Rasmussen (first round)
4. (Japan) Takeshi Kamura / Keigo Sonoda (semi-final)
5. (Indonesia) Andrei Adistia / Hendra Aprida Gunawan (withdrew)
6. (Japan) Kenta Kazuno / Kazushi Yamada (quarter-final)
7. (Poland) Adam Cwalina / Przemysław Wacha (second round)
8. (Germany) Michael Fuchs / Johannes Schottler (second round)

=== Finals ===
Semifinals

Final

- (China) Li Junhui
- (China) Liu Yuchen
21
18
21

- (Japan) Takuro Hoki
- (Japan) Yugo Kobayashi
17
21
11

- (China) Li Junhui
- (China) Liu Yuchen
21
21

- (India) Manu Attri
- (India) Sumeeth Reddy B.
12
16

4
- (Japan) Takeshi Kamura
- (Japan) Keigo Sonoda
17
17

- (India) Manu Attri
- (India) Sumeeth Reddy B.
21
21

=== Top half ===
==== Section 1 ====
First round

Second round

Quarterfinals

PFQ
- (Malaysia) Hoon TH
- (Malaysia) Lim KW
19
15

- (France) B Careme
- (France) R Labar
21
21

- (France) B Careme
- (France) R Labar
17
12

- (China) Li JH
- (China) Liu YC
21
21

- (China) Li JH
- (China) Liu YC
21
21

- (England) A Ellis
- (England) P Mills
17
15

- (China) Li JH
- (China) Liu YC
21
19
21

6
- (Japan) K Kazuno
- (Japan) K Yamada
13
21
18

6
- (Japan) K Kazuno
- (Japan) K Yamada
14
21
21

- (United States) P Chew
- (United States) S Pongnairat
21
13
8

6
- (Japan) K Kazuno
- (Japan) K Yamada
24
21

- (Chinese Taipei) Lin C-y
- (Chinese Taipei) Wu H-l
22
10

PFQ
- (Canada) P Charron
- (Canada) T Ng
10
10

- (Chinese Taipei) Lin C-y
- (Chinese Taipei) Wu H-l
21
21

==== Section 2 ====
First round

Second round

Quarterfinals

3
- (Denmark) K Astrup
- (Denmark) A Rasmussen
16
19

- (Japan) T Hoki
- (Japan) Y Kobayashi
21
21

- (Japan) T Hoki
- (Japan) Y Kobayashi
18
21
21

PFQ
- (England) C Coles
- (Scotland) P Van Rietvelde
21
19
17

PFQ
- (England) C Coles
- (Scotland) P Van Rietvelde
21
21

- (Brazil) H Arthuso
- (Brazil) D Paiola
18
13

- (Japan) T Hoki
- (Japan) Y Kobayashi
21
21

- (Thailand) K Ketlen
- (Thailand) D Puavaranukroh
18
15

8
- (Germany) M Fuchs
- (Germany) J Schottler
21
19
21

- (Chinese Taipei) Liang J-w
- (Chinese Taipei) Lu C-p
18
21
13

8
- (Germany) M Fuchs
- (Germany) J Schottler
21
15
19

- (Thailand) K Ketlen
- (Thailand) D Puavaranukroh
19
21
21

- (Canada) A Liu
- (Canada) D Ng
16
19

- (Thailand) K Ketlen
- (Thailand) D Puavaranukroh
21
21

=== Bottom half ===
==== Section 3 ====
First round

Second round

Quarterfinals

- (Japan) T Inoue
- (Japan) Y Kaneko
21
20
16

Q4
- (Chinese Taipei) Lee J-h
- (Chinese Taipei) Lee Y
17
22
21

Q4
- (Chinese Taipei) Lee J-h
- (Chinese Taipei) Lee Y
21
21

7
- (Poland) A Cwałina
- (Poland) P Wacha
18
14

- (Australia) M Chau
- (Australia) S Serasinghe
21
14
17

7
- (Poland) A Cwałina
- (Poland) P Wacha
18
21
21

Q4
- (Chinese Taipei) Lee J-h
- (Chinese Taipei) Lee Y
13
21
18

4
- (Japan) T Kamura
- (Japan) K Sonoda
21
19
21

Q2
- (Hong Kong) Or CC
- (Hong Kong) Tang CM
21
19
20

- (Germany) P Kaesbauer
- (Germany) M Lamsfuss
17
21
22

- (Germany) P Kaesbauer
- (Germany) M Lamsfuss
13
19

4
- (Japan) T Kamura
- (Japan) K Sonoda
21
21

- (China) Huang KX
- (China) Wang SJ
15
19

4
- (Japan) T Kamura
- (Japan) K Sonoda
21
21

==== Section 4 ====
First round

Second round

Quarterfinals

Q3
- (Brazil) Y De Oliveira
- (Brazil) A Tjong
10
17

- (England) M Ellis
- (England) C Langridge
21
21

- (England) M Ellis
- (England) C Langridge
21
21

PFQ
- (Hong Kong) Chan Y L
- (Hong Kong) Lee C H
3
11

- (Chinese Taipei) Liao M-c
- (Chinese Taipei) Tseng M-h
18
21
16

PFQ
- (Hong Kong) Chan Y L
- (Hong Kong) Lee C H
21
18
21

- (England) M Ellis
- (England) C Langridge
20
13

- (India) M Attri
- (India) S Reddy
22
21

- (India) M Attri
- (India) S Reddy
21
21

Q1
- (India) K. Dilshad
- (India) T Kona
16
9

- (India) M Attri
- (India) S Reddy
21
14
21

2
- (Japan) H Hashimoto
- (Japan) N Hirata
18
21
19

- (Canada) K Li
- (Canada) N Yakura
15
11

2
- (Japan) H Hashimoto
- (Japan) N Hirata
21
21

== Women's doubles ==
=== Seeds ===
1. (Japan) Reika Kakiiwa / Miyuki Maeda (first round)
2. (Netherlands) Eefje Muskens / Selena Piek (quarter-final)
3. (Japan) Shizuka Matsuo / Mami Naito (quarter-final)
4. (India) Jwala Gutta / Ashwini Ponnappa (semi-final)
5. (China) Yu Yang / Zhong Qianxin (champion)
6. (United States) Eva Lee / Paula Lynn Obanana (second round)
7. (Germany) Johanna Goliszewski / Carla Nelte (quarter-final)
8. (England) Heather Olver / Lauren Smith (first round)

=== Finals ===
Semifinals

Final

- (Japan) Ayane Kurihara
- (Japan) Naru Shinoya
21
21

4
- (India) Jwala Gutta
- (India) Ashwini Ponnappa
17
11

- (Japan) Ayane Kurihara
- (Japan) Naru Shinoya
14
10

5
- (China) Yu Yang
- (China) Zhong Qianxin
21
21

- (Japan) Naoko Fukuman
- (Japan) Kurumi Yonao
18
5

5
- (China) Yu Yang
- (China) Zhong Qianxin
21
21

=== Top half ===
==== Section 1 ====
First round

Second round

Quarterfinals

1
- (Japan) R Kakiiwa
- (Japan) M Maeda
10^{r}

- (Canada) A Bruce
- (Canada) P Chan
11

- (Canada) A Bruce
- (Canada) P Chan
21
19
11

PFQ
- (Chinese Taipei) Huang M-c
- (Chinese Taipei) Liu S-c
18
21
21

PFQ
- (Dominican Republic) B Polanco
- (Dominican Republic) D Saturria
5
10

PFQ
- (Chinese Taipei) Huang M-c
- (Chinese Taipei) Liu S-c
21
21

PFQ
- (Chinese Taipei) Huang M-c
- (Chinese Taipei) Liu S-c
20
14

- (Japan) A Kurihara
- (Japan) N Shinoya
22
21

6
- (United States) E Lee
- (United States) P Obanana
13
21
21

PFQ
- (Chinese Taipei) Chiang K-h
- (Chinese Taipei) Wu F-c
21
17
14

6
- (United States) E Lee
- (United States) P Obanana
10
12

- (Japan) A Kurihara
- (Japan) N Shinoya
21
21

- (Netherlands) S Barning
- (Netherlands) I Tabeling
11
17

- (Japan) A Kurihara
- (Japan) N Shinoya
21
21

==== Section 2 ====
First round

Second round

Quarterfinals

4
- (India) J Gutta
- (India) A Ponnappa
21
21

- (Japan) M Matsumoto
- (Japan) W Nagahara
16
14

4
- (India) J Gutta
- (India) A Ponnappa
21
21

- (Turkey) O Bayrak
- (Turkey) N Yigit
10
18

- (Turkey) O Bayrak
- (Turkey) N Yigit
23
21

- (Brazil) L Vicente
- (Brazil) L Vicente
21
14

4
- (India) J Gutta
- (India) A Ponnappa
21
21

7
- (Germany) J Goliszewski
- (Germany) C Nelte
17
14

7
- (Germany) J Goliszewski
- (Germany) C Nelte
13
21
21

- (Chinese Taipei) Cheng C-y
- (Chinese Taipei) Lee C-h
21
18
18

7
- (Germany) J Goliszewski
- (Germany) C Nelte
21
18
24

- (Hong Kong) Chan TK
- (Hong Kong) Yuen SY
19
21
22

- (United States) A Lee
- (England) J Wallwork
11
5

- (Hong Kong) Chan TK
- (Hong Kong) Yuen SY
21
21

=== Bottom half ===
==== Section 3 ====
First round

Second round

Quarterfinals

- (Japan) N Fukuman
- (Japan) K Yonao
21
21

- (Chinese Taipei) Hsieh P-c
- (Chinese Taipei) Wu T-j
9
10

- (Japan) N Fukuman
- (Japan) K Yonao
19
21
21

- (Hong Kong) Poon LY
- (Hong Kong) Tse YS
21
15
15

- (Hong Kong) Poon LY
- (Hong Kong) Tse YS
15
21
21

8
- (England) H Olver
- (England) L Smith
21
14
11

- (Japan) N Fukuman
- (Japan) K Yonao
21
21

3
- (Japan) S Matsuo
- (Japan) M Naito
11
19

- (India) P Gadre
- (India) S Reddy
18
20

- (Japan) S Tanaka
- (Japan) K Yonemoto
21
22

- (Japan) S Tanaka
- (Japan) K Yonemoto
7
20

3
- (Japan) S Matsuo
- (Japan) M Naito
21
22

Q1
BYE

3
- (Japan) S Matsuo
- (Japan) M Naito

==== Section 4 ====
First round

Second round

Quarterfinals

Q4
- (China) Huang DP
- (China) Zhu MC
5
9

- (Chinese Taipei) Hsu Y-c
- (Chinese Taipei) Pai Y-p
21
21

- (Chinese Taipei) Hsu Y-c
- (Chinese Taipei) Pai Y-p
10
4

5
- (China) Yu Y
- (China) Zhong QX
21
21

- (France) A Fontaine
- (France) E Lefel
21
11

5
- (China) Yu Y
- (China) Zhong QX
23
21

5
- (China) Yu Y
- (China) Zhong QX
21
21

2
- (Netherlands) E Muskens
- (Netherlands) S Piek
15
11

- (Russia) O Golovanova
- (Russia) V Vorobeva
11
7

- (Germany) I Herttrich
- (Germany) B Michels
21
21

- (Germany) I Herttrich
- (Germany) B Michels
22
15
13

2
- (Netherlands) E Muskens
- (Netherlands) S Piek
20
21
21

- (Brazil) P Pereira
- (Brazil) F Silva
6
8

2
- (Netherlands) E Muskens
- (Netherlands) S Piek
21
21

== Mixed doubles ==
=== Seeds ===
1. (Germany) Michael Fuchs / Birgit Michels (semi-final)
2. (Hong Kong) Lee Chun Hei / Chau Hoi Wah (final)
3. (Netherlands) Jacco Arends / Selena Piek (semi-final)
4. (Hong Kong) Chan Yun Lung / Tse Ying Suet (second round)
5. (Netherlands) Jorrit de Ruiter / Samantha Barning (second round)
6. (United States) Phillip Chew / Jamie Subandhi (first round)
7. (China) Liu Yuchen / Zhong Qianxin (first round)
8. (Canada) Toby Ng / Alex Bruce (quarter-final)

=== Finals ===
Semifinals

Final

1
- (Germany) Michael Fuchs
- (Germany) Birgit Michels
13
21
15

- (China) Huang Kaixiang
- (China) Huang Dongping
21
12
21

- (China) Huang Kaixiang
- (China) Huang Dongping
21
21

2
- (Hong Kong) Lee Chun Hei
- (Hong Kong) Chau Hoi Wah
15
14

3
- (Netherlands) Jacco Arends
- (Netherlands) Selena Piek
19
17

2
- (Hong Kong) Lee Chun Hei
- (Hong Kong) Chau Hoi Wah
21
21

=== Top half ===
==== Section 1 ====
First round

Second round

Quarterfinals

1
- (Germany) M Fuchs
- (Germany) B Michels
21
18
21

- (Sweden) J Nordh
- (Sweden) E Fabbeke
13
21
15

1
- (Germany) M Fuchs
- (Germany) B Michels
24
21

PFQ
- (Sweden) N Ruponen
- (Sweden) A Hogstrom
22
11

PFQ
- (Sweden) N Ruponen
- (Sweden) A Hogstrom
29
21
21

- (Chinese Taipei) Liao M-c
- (Chinese Taipei) Chen H-h
30
19
12

1
- (Germany) M Fuchs
- (Germany) B Michels
21
21

- (Australia) R Middleton
- (Australia) L Choo
17
16

6
- (United States) P Chew
- (United States) J Subandhi
14
12

- (Australia) R Middleton
- (Australia) L Choo
21
21

- (Australia) R Middleton
- (Australia) L Choo
21
21

- (Japan) T Inoue
- (Japan) S Matsuo
13
14

- (France) R Labar
- (France) E Lefel
12
19

- (Japan) T Inoue
- (Japan) S Matsuo
21
21

==== Section 2 ====
First round

Second round

Quarterfinals

4
- (Hong Kong) Chan YL
- (Hong Kong) Tse YS
21
21

Q3
- (France) B Careme
- (Switzerland) S Jaquet
14
19

4
- (Hong Kong) Chan YL
- (Hong Kong) Tse YS
19
21
18

- (China) Huang KX
- (China) Huang DP
21
18
21

- (China) Huang KX
- (China) Huang DP
21
21

- (Brazil) A Tjong
- (Brazil) L Vicente
10
15

- (China) Huang KX
- (China) Huang DP
21
21

Q1
- (Chinese Taipei) Lu C-p
- (Chinese Taipei) Lee C-h
7
13

5
- (Netherlands) J de Ruiter
- (Netherlands) S Barning
21
21

- (Canada) P Charron
- (Canada) P Chan
11
18

5
- (Netherlands) J de Ruiter
- (Netherlands) S Barning
22
21
19

Q1
- (Chinese Taipei) Lu C-p
- (Chinese Taipei) Lee C-h
24
13
21

- (India) T Kona
- (India) S Reddy
18
16

Q1
- (Chinese Taipei) Lu C-p
- (Chinese Taipei) Lee C-h
21
21

=== Bottom half ===
==== Section 3 ====
First round

Second round

Quarterfinals

PFQ
- (Australia) M Chau
- (Australia) G Somerville
14
7

Q4
- (Chinese Taipei) Liang J-w
- (Chinese Taipei) Cheng C-y
21
21

Q4
- (Chinese Taipei) Liang J-w
- (Chinese Taipei) Cheng C-y
23
21
15

8
- (Canada) T Ng
- (Canada) A Bruce
25
16
21

PFQ
- (Canada) N Yakura
- (Canada) B Tam
20
17

8
- (Canada) T Ng
- (Canada) A Bruce
22
21

8
- (Canada) T Ng
- (Canada) A Bruce
13
14

3
- (Netherlands) J Arends
- (Netherlands) S Piek
21
21

- (Japan) K Kazuno
- (Japan) A Kurihara
10
21
21

Q2
- (Chinese Taipei) Lee Y
- (Chinese Taipei) Wu F-c
21
14
15

- (Japan) K Kazuno
- (Japan) A Kurihara
21
19
17

3
- (Netherlands) J Arends
- (Netherlands) S Piek
13
21
21

- (United States) H Shu
- (United States) E Lee
12
11

3
- (Netherlands) J Arends
- (Netherlands) S Piek
21
21

==== Section 4 ====
First round

Second round

Quarterfinals

- (France) G Mittelheisser
- (France) A Fontaine
18
9

- (Hong Kong) Tang CM
- (Hong Kong) Poon LY
21
21

- (Hong Kong) Tang CM
- (Hong Kong) Poon LY
21
19

- (Germany) P Kaesbauer
- (Germany) C Nelte
23
21

- (Germany) P Kaesbauer
- (Germany) C Nelte
21
15
21

7
- (China) Liu YC
- (China) Zhong QX
18
21
15

- (Germany) P Kaesbauer
- (Germany) C Nelte
4
20

2
- (Hong Kong) Lee CH
- (Hong Kong) Chau HW
21
22

- (Chinese Taipei) Chang K-c
- (Chinese Taipei) Chang H-t
13
9

- (Germany) M Lamsfuss
- (Germany) I Herttrich
21
21

- (Germany) M Lamsfuss
- (Germany) I Herttrich
14
9

2
- (Hong Kong) Lee CH
- (Hong Kong) Chau HW
21
21

- (Chinese Taipei) Lin C-y
- (Chinese Taipei) Wu T-j
17
14

2
- (Hong Kong) Lee CH
- (Hong Kong) Chau HW
21
21

Preceded by 2015 New Zealand Open Grand Prix	BWF Grand Prix Gold and Grand Prix; 2015 BWF season	Succeeded by 2015 Canada Open Grand Prix
