= 2015 Canada Open Grand Prix =

Tournament details
- Dates: June 23, 2015 - June 28, 2015
- Level: Grand Prix
- Total prize money: US$50,000
- Venue: Markin MacPhail Centre
- Location: Calgary, Canada

Champions
- Men's singles: (Malaysia) Lee Chong Wei
- Women's singles: (Canada) Michelle Li
- Men's doubles: (China) Li Junhui (China) Liu Yuchen
- Women's doubles: (India) Jwala Gutta (India) Ashwini Ponnappa
- Mixed doubles: (Hong Kong) Lee Chun Hei (Hong Kong) Chau Hoi Wah

The 2015 Canada Open Grand Prix was the eighth grand prix and grand prix gold tournament of the 2015 BWF Grand Prix and Grand Prix Gold. The tournament was held at the Markin MacPhail Centre in Calgary, Canada June 23 until June 28, 2015, and had a total purse of $50,000.

== Players by nation ==
| Nation | First round | Second round | Third round | Quarterfinals | Semifinals | Final |
|---|---|---|---|---|---|---|
| (Canada) | 21 | 5 | | | | |
| (Chinese Taipei) | 11 | 4 | 1 | 10 | | |
| (Brazil) | 9 | 1 | | | | |
| (United States) | 7 | 3 | | | | |
| (Australia) | 5 | 2 | | | | |
| (England) | 5 | 1 | | | | |
| (India) | 4 | 2 | 1 | 4 | | |
| (Sweden) | 4 | | | | | |
| (China) | 3 | 5 | | 1 | | 1 |
| (Hong Kong) | 3 | 3 | 1 | 1 | 1 | 1 |
| (Indonesia) | 2 | 2 | 1 | | 1 | 1 |
| (Czech Republic) | 2 | 2 | | | | |
| (Thailand) | 2 | | | | | |
| (Scotland) | 2 | | | | | |
| (Switzerland) | 2 | | | | | |
| (Brazil) | 2 | | | | | |
| (Japan) | 1 | 1 | | 4 | 4 | 1 |
| (Netherlands) | 1 | 1 | | 1 | 1 | 1 |
| (Germany) | 1 | 6 | | | 2 | |
| (France) | 1 | 2 | 1 | | | |
| (Poland) | 1 | 1 | | | | |
| (Malaysia) | 1 | | | | 1 | |
| (Jamaica) | 1 | | | | | |
| (Trinidad and Tobago) | 1 | | | | | |
| (Norway) | 1 | | | | | |
| (Dominican Republic) | 1 | | | | | |
| (Denmark) | | 1 | 1 | | | |
| (Cuba) | | 1 | | | | |
| (Austria) | | 1 | | | | |
| (Spain) | | 1 | | | | |
| (Sri Lanka) | | | 1 | | | |

== Men's singles ==
=== Seeds ===
1. (Germany) Marc Zwiebler (semi-final)
2. (China) Xue Song (quarter-final)
3. (Chinese Taipei) Hsu Jen-hao (quarter-final)
4. (Indonesia) Dionysius Hayom Rumbaka (withdrew)
5. (Hong Kong) Wong Wing Ki (third round)
6. (Japan) Takuma Ueda (semi-final)
7. (Hong Kong) Ng Ka Long (final)
8. (Malaysia) Chong Wei Feng (first round)
9. (India) Ajay Jayaram (quarter-final)
10. (India) Sai Praneeth (quarter-final)
11. (India) Anand Pawar (third round)
12. (Cuba) Osleni Guerrero (second round)
13. (Chinese Taipei) Wang Tzu-wei (first round)
14. (Malaysia) Lee Chong Wei (champion)
15. (Denmark) Joachim Persson (third round)
16. (France) Thomas Rouxel (third round)

=== Finals ===
Quarterfinals
1 | (Germany) Marc Zwiebler | 21 | 21
9 | (India) Ajay Jayaram | 16 | 15
3 | (Chinese Taipei) Hsu Jen-hao | 17 | 21 | 7
7 | (Hong Kong) Ng Ka Long | 21 | 13 | 21
14 | (Malaysia) Lee Chong Wei | 21 | 18 | 21
10 | (India) Sai Praneeth | 13 | 21 | 11
6 | (Japan) Takuma Ueda | 19 | 21 | 21
2 | (China) Xue Song | 21 | 18 | 17

Semifinals
1 | (Germany) Marc Zwiebler | 17 | 15
7 | (Hong Kong) Ng Ka Long | 21 | 21
14 | (Malaysia) Lee Chong Wei | 16 | 21 | 21
6 | (Japan) Takuma Ueda | 21 | 10 | 12

Final
7 | (Hong Kong) Ng Ka Long | 17 | 13
14 | (Malaysia) Lee Chong Wei | 21 | 21

=== Top half ===
==== Section 1 ====
First round
1 | (Germany) M Zwiebler | 21 | 21
Q4 | (Canada) K Barkman | 6 | 8
PFQ | (Jamaica) D Reid | 9 | 8
(Chinese Taipei) Yang C-c | 21 | 21
12 | (Cuba) O Guerrero | 21 | 21
PFQ | (Canada) B Holcek | 8 | 10
Q8 | (Canada) A Zhuang | 10 | 14
PFQ | (Chinese Taipei) Kuo C-h | 21 | 21

Second round
1 | (Germany) M Zwiebler | 21 | 19 | 21
(Chinese Taipei) Yang C-c | 19 | 21 | 17
12 | (Cuba) O Guerrero | 19 | 21 | 15
PFQ | (Chinese Taipei) Kuo C-h | 21 | 15 | 21

Third round
1 | (Germany) M Zwiebler | 21 | 21
PFQ | (Chinese Taipei) Kuo C-h | 13 | 14

==== Section 2 ====
First round
8 | (Malaysia) Chong WF | 15 | 20
(Denmark) C Thomsen | 21 | 22
(Czech Republic) A Mendrek | 13 | 16
(Indonesia) W Prasetyo | 21 | 21
9 | (India) A Jayaram | 21 | 21
(Chinese Taipei) Shih K-c | 10 | 19
(China) Huang YX | 21 | 21
(Trinidad and Tobago) N Bonkowsky | 3 | 7

Second round
(Denmark) C Thomsen | 14 | 12
(Indonesia) W Prasetyo | 21 | 21
9 | (India) A Jayaram | 21 | 21
(China) Huang YX | 15 | 16

Third round
(Indonesia) W Prasetyo | 12 | 21 | 12
9 | (India) A Jayaram | 21 | 17 | 21

==== Section 3 ====
First round
3 | (Chinese Taipei) Hsu J-h | 21 | 21
(England) T Penty | 16 | 19
(Sweden) M Borg | 18 | 21 | 11
(Czech Republic) M Ludík | 21 | 16 | 21
16 | (France) T Rouxel | 21 | 21
(Thailand) S Thammasin | 19 | 14
(Canada) A D'Souza | 21 | 12 | 21
Q5 | (Canada) J Ho-Shue | 19 | 21 | 16

Second round
3 | (Chinese Taipei) Hsu J-h | 21 | 21
(Czech Republic) M Ludík | 16 | 11
16 | (France) T Rouxel | 21 | 21
(Canada) A D'Souza | 12 | 13

Third round
3 | (Chinese Taipei) Hsu J-h | 26 | 21
16 | (France) T Rouxel | 24 | 9

==== Section 4 ====
First round
7 | (Hong Kong) Ng KL | 21 | 21
Q3 | (Canada) J Lai | 3 | 9
(Austria) M Almer | 21 | 21
Q7 | (Canada) A Lin | 9 | 5
15 | (Denmark) J Persson | 17 | 21 | 21
(Canada) M Giuffre | 21 | 13 | 11
(United States) H Shu | 21 | 21
(Australia) D Guda | 18 | 14

Second round
7 | (Hong Kong) Ng KL | 21 | 21
(Austria) M Almer | 14 | 17
15 | (Denmark) J Persson | 21 | 21
(United States) H Shu | 9 | 18

Third round
7 | (Hong Kong) Ng KL | 22 | 21
15 | (Denmark) J Persson | 20 | 14

=== Bottom half ===
==== Section 5 ====
First round
(China) Shi YQ | 21 | 21
(India) R.M.V.Gurusaidutt | 9 | 14
Q1 | (Canada) A Li | 6 | 9
14 | (Malaysia) Lee CW | 21 | 21
(United States) S Pongnairat | 21 | 21
PFQ | (United States) T Lam | 12 | 12
(Poland) A Dziolko | 21 | 18 | 11
5 | (Hong Kong) Wong WK | 19 | 21 | 21

Second round
(China) Shi YQ | 14 | 15
14 | (Malaysia) Lee CW | 21 | 21
(United States) S Pongnairat | 7 | 15
5 | (Hong Kong) Wong WK | 21 | 21

Third round
14 | (Malaysia) Lee CW | 21 | 20 | 21
5 | (Hong Kong) Wong WK | 17 | 22 | 10

==== Section 6 ====
First round
(Czech Republic) J Fröhlich | 21 | 21
(Indonesia) N Sulistyo | 14 | 10
(Scotland) A Casey | 11 | 17
10 | (India) S Praneeth | 21 | 21
PFQ | (Canada) J Kryczka | 17 | 15
Q6 | (Canada) G Robb | 21 | 21
(Sri Lanka) N Karunaratne | 21 | 21
PFQ | (United States) A Shekhtman | 8 | 16

Second round
(Czech Republic) J Fröhlich | 14 | 16
10 | (India) S Praneeth | 21 | 21
Q6 | (Canada) G Robb | 7 | 16
(Sri Lanka) N Karunaratne | 21 | 21

Third round
10 | (India) S Praneeth | 14 | 21 | 21
(Sri Lanka) N Karunaratne | 21 | 15 | 15

==== Section 7 ====
First round
(Canada) L Couture | 16 | 17
(Australia) P Low | 21 | 21
(Indonesia) S Rhustavito | 12 | 21 | 21
13 | (Chinese Taipei) Wang T-w | 21 | 19 | 16
(Norway) M Myhre | 15 | 14
(China) Guo K | 21 | 21
(Chinese Taipei) Lin Y-h | 10 | 16
6 | (Japan) T Ueda | 21 | 21

Second round
(Australia) P Low | 9 | 10
(Indonesia) S Rhustavito | 21 | 21
(China) Guo K | 15 | 14
6 | (Japan) T Ueda | 21 | 21

Third round
(Indonesia) S Rhustavito | 16 | 13
6 | (Japan) T Ueda | 21 | 21

==== Section 8 ====
First round
PFQ | (United States) R Chew | 9 | 9
(China) Zhu SY | 21 | 21
Q2 | (United States) N Waller | 9 | 10
11 | (India) A Pawar | 21 | 21
PFQ | (Canada) S Shatenko | 8 | 14
(Denmark) R Fladberg | 21 | 21
(Sweden) H Hurskainen | 16 | 16
2 | (China) Xue S | 21 | 21

Second round
(China) Zhu SY | 17 | 16
11 | (India) A Pawar | 21 | 21
(Denmark) R Fladberg | 16 | 21 | 7
2 | (China) Xue S | 21 | 15 | 21

Third round
11 | (India) A Pawar | 15 | 13
2 | (China) Xue S | 21 | 21

== Women's singles ==
=== Seeds ===
1. (Japan) Akane Yamaguchi (withdrew)
2. (United States) Zhang Beiwen (second round)
3. (Canada) Michelle Li (champion)
4. (Japan) Sayaka Takahashi (semi-final)
5. (Japan) Minatsu Mitani (semi-final)
6. (Spain) Beatriz Corrales (second round)
7. (Chinese Taipei) Pai Yu-po (quarter-final)
8. (Japan) Sayaka Sato (second round)

=== Finals ===
Semifinals
5 | (Japan) Minatsu Mitani | 21 | 17 | 13
3 | (Canada) Michelle Li | 13 | 21 | 21
4 | (Japan) Sayaka Takahashi | 16 | 19
(Japan) Kaori Imabeppu | 21 | 21

Final
3 | (Canada) Michelle Li | 21 | 25
(Japan) Kaori Imabeppu | 17 | 23

=== Top half ===
==== Section 1 ====
First round
PFQ | (Chinese Taipei) Lee C-h | 21 | 21
(Australia) J Lai | 15 | 8
Q1 | (Sweden) B Pirzamanbein | 6 | 5
(Indonesia) M Kusumastuti | 21 | 21
5 | (Japan) M Mitani | 21 | 21
(Chinese Taipei) Cheng C-y | 13 | 12
(United States) I Wang | 21 | 14 | 19
(Germany) K Schnaase | 14 | 21 | 21

Second round
PFQ | (Chinese Taipei) Lee C-h | 21 | 21
(Indonesia) M Kusumastuti | 15 | 15
5 | (Japan) M Mitani | 21 | 21
(Germany) K Schnaase | 10 | 11

Quarterfinals
PFQ | (Chinese Taipei) Lee C-h | 17 | 16
5 | (Japan) M Mitani | 21 | 21

==== Section 2 ====
First round
3 | (Canada) M Li | 21 | 20 | 21
Q3 | (China) Shen YY | 18 | 22 | 16
(United States) J Subandhi | 11 | 14
(India) T Lad | 21 | 21
7 | (Chinese Taipei) Pai Y-p | 22 | 21
Q2 | (China) Li Y | 20 | 19
PFQ | (Canada) B Tam | 19 | 11
(Hong Kong) Cheung NY | 21 | 21

Second round
3 | (Canada) M Li | 21 | 21
(India) T Lad | 14 | 13
7 | (Chinese Taipei) Pai Y-p | 21 | 21
(Hong Kong) Cheung NY | 9 | 15

Quarterfinals
3 | (Canada) M Li | 20 | 21 | 21
7 | (Chinese Taipei) Pai Y-p | 22 | 14 | 18

=== Bottom half ===
==== Section 3 ====
First round
(Japan) A Ohori | 21 | 21
(Switzerland) S Jaquet | 14 | 18
Q4 | (Japan) Y Kusunose | 14 | 19
6 | (Spain) B Corrales | 21 | 21
(Czech Republic) Z Pavelkova | 9 | 15
(United States) R Schafer | 21 | 21
(Canada) R Honderich | 7 | 4
4 | (Japan) S Takahashi | 21 | 21

Second round
(Japan) A Ohori | 21 | 17 | 21
6 | (Spain) B Corrales | 8 | 21 | 12
(United States) R Schafer | 7 | 8
4 | (Japan) S Takahashi | 21 | 21

Quarterfinals
(Japan) A Ohori | 27 | 18
4 | (Japan) S Takahashi | 29 | 21

==== Section 4 ====
First round
(Japan) Y Hashimoto | 21 | 21
(India) P Thulasi | 8 | 11
PFQ | (France) P Le Buhanic | 11 | 11
8 | (Japan) S Sato | 21 | 21
(Japan) K Imabeppu | 21 | 21
(England) F Chapman | 10 | 14
(Chinese Taipei) Hsu Y-c | 15 | 25 | 14
2 | (United States) Zhang BW | 21 | 23 | 21

Second round
(Japan) Y Hashimoto | 14 | 21 | 21
8 | (Japan) S Sato | 21 | 15 | 17
(Japan) K Imabeppu | 21 | 21
2 | (United States) Zhang BW | 15 | 11

Quarterfinals
(Japan) Y Hashimoto | 21 | 12 | 8
(Japan) K Imabeppu | 14 | 21 | 21

== Men's doubles ==
=== Seeds ===
1. (Indonesia) Andrei Adistia / Hendra Aprida Gunawan (semi-final)
2. (Poland) Adam Cwalina / Przemysław Wacha (second round)
3. (Germany) Michael Fuchs / Johannes Schottler (second round)
4. (India) Manu Attri / Sumeeth Reddy Buss (second round)
5. (China) Li Junhui / Liu Yuchen (champion)
6. (United States) Phillip Chew / Sattawat Pongnairat (first round)
7. (France) Baptiste Careme / Ronan Labar (second round)
8. (England) Andrew Ellis / Peter Mills (second round)

=== Finals ===
Semifinals

Final

1
- (Indonesia) Andrei Adistia
- (Indonesia) Hendra Aprida Gunawan
20
10

5
- (China) Li Junhui
- (China) Liu Yuchen
22
21

5
- (China) Li Junhui
- (China) Liu Yuchen
17
21
21

- (China) Huang Kaixiang
- (China) Wang Sijie
21
12
18

- (Malaysia) Hoon Thien How
- (Malaysia) Lim Khim Wah
18
21
15

- (China) Huang Kaixiang
- (China) Wang Sijie
21
18
21

=== Top half ===
==== Section 1 ====
First round

Second round

Quarterfinals

1
- (Indonesia) A Adistia
- (Indonesia) H Gunawan
21
21

- (Thailand) K Ketlen
- (Thailand) D Puavaranukroh
13
13

1
- (Indonesia) A Adistia
- (Indonesia) H Gunawan
21
21

- (Canada) P Charron
- (Canada) T Ng
15
18

PFQ
- (India) K. Dilshad
- (India) T Kona
21
12
17

- (Canada) P Charron
- (Canada) T Ng
14
21
21

1
- (Indonesia) A Adistia
- (Indonesia) H Gunawan
21
21

- (Chinese Taipei) Liao M-c
- (Chinese Taipei) Tseng M-h
16
17

7
- (France) B Careme
- (France) R Labar
21
21

- (England) C Coles
- (Scotland) P Van Rietvelde
18
16

7
- (France) B Careme
- (France) R Labar
12
23

- (Chinese Taipei) Liao M-c
- (Chinese Taipei) Tseng M-h
21
25

- (Germany) P Kaesbauer
- (Germany) M Lamsfuss
15
12

- (Chinese Taipei) Liao M-c
- (Chinese Taipei) Tseng M-h
21
21

==== Section 2 ====
First round

Second round

Quarterfinals

4
- (India) M Attri
- (India) S Reddy
21
15
21

- (Canada) A Liu
- (Canada) D Ng
12
21
12

4
- (India) M Attri
- (India) S Reddy
19
19

Q4
- (Chinese Taipei) Lee J-h
- (Chinese Taipei) Lee Y
21
21

Q1
- (Chinese Taipei) Lu J-s
- (Chinese Taipei) Yang P-h
21
17
16

Q4
- (Chinese Taipei) Lee J-h
- (Chinese Taipei) Lee Y
19
21
21

Q4
- (Chinese Taipei) Lee J-h
- (Chinese Taipei) Lee Y
20
22

5
- (China) Li JH
- (China) Liu YC
22
24

5
- (China) Li JH
- (China) Liu YC
21
21

PFQ
- (Canada) B Holcek
- (Canada) J Kryczka
9
7

5
- (China) Li JH
- (China) Liu YC
21
16
21

Q3
- (Hong Kong) Chan TK
- (Hong Kong) Law CH
11
21
13

Q3
- (Hong Kong) Chan TK
- (Hong Kong) Law CH
21
21

PFQ
- (Canada) A Bauer
- (Canada) G Robb
13
11

=== Bottom half ===
==== Section 3 ====
First round

Second round

Quarterfinals

- (United States) R Chew
- (Netherlands) K Ridder
16
17

Q2
- (Canada) J Ho-Shue
- (Canada) J Lai
21
21

Q2
- (Canada) J Ho-Shue
- (Canada) J Lai
22
12

- (Chinese Taipei) Chang K-c
- (Chinese Taipei) Wang T-w
24
21

- (Chinese Taipei) Chang K-c
- (Chinese Taipei) Wang T-w
21
23

6
- (United States) P Chew
- (United States) S Pongnairat
19
21

- (Chinese Taipei) Chang K-c
- (Chinese Taipei) Wang T-w
8
21
14

- (Malaysia) Hoon TH
- (Malaysia) Lim KW
21
19
21

- (Malaysia) Hoon TH
- (Malaysia) Lim KW
9
21
21

- (Chinese Taipei) Lin C-y
- (Chinese Taipei) Wu H-l
21
13
14

- (Malaysia) Hoon TH
- (Malaysia) Lim KW
13
21
21

3
- (Germany) M Fuchs
- (Germany) J Schottler
21
18
14

- (Hong Kong) Chan Y L
- (Hong Kong) Lee C H
12
21
22

3
- (Germany) M Fuchs
- (Germany) J Schottler
21
16
24

==== Section 4 ====
First round

Second round

Quarterfinals

- (Canada) K Li
- (Canada) N Yakura
12
14

- (China) Huang KX
- (China) Wang SJ
21
21

- (China) Huang KX
- (China) Wang SJ
21
21

8
- (England) A Ellis
- (England) P Mills
14
14

PFQ
- (United States) A Shekhtman
- (United States) N Waller
6
8

8
- (England) A Ellis
- (England) P Mills
21
21

- (China) Huang KX
- (China) Wang SJ
21
21

- (Chinese Taipei) Liang J-w
- (Chinese Taipei) Lu C-p
19
12

- (Chinese Taipei) Liang J-w
- (Chinese Taipei) Lu C-p
21
21

- (Australia) M Chau
- (Australia) S Serasinghe
16
12

- (Chinese Taipei) Liang J-w
- (Chinese Taipei) Lu C-p
21
17
22

2
- (Poland) A Cwałina
- (Poland) P Wacha
16
21
20

PFQ
- (Hong Kong) Or CC
- (Hong Kong) Tang CM
19
6

2
- (Poland) A Cwałina
- (Poland) P Wacha
21
21

== Women's doubles ==
=== Seeds ===
1. (Netherlands) Eefje Muskens / Selena Piek (final)
2. (Japan) Shizuka Matsuo / Mami Naito (quarter-final)
3. (India) Jwala Gutta / Ashwini Ponnappa (champion)
4. (Germany) Johanna Goliszewski / Carla Nelte (second round)

=== Finals ===
Semifinals

Final

1
- (Netherlands) Eefje Muskens
- (Netherlands) Selena Piek
21
18
21

- (Hong Kong) Poon Lok Yan
- (Hong Kong) Tse Ying Suet
16
21
16

1
- (Netherlands) Eefje Muskens
- (Netherlands) Selena Piek
19
16

3
- (India) Jwala Gutta
- (India) Ashwini Ponnappa
21
21

3
- (India) Jwala Gutta
- (India) Ashwini Ponnappa
21
21

- (Japan) Shiho Tanaka
- (Japan) Koharu Yonemoto
17
16

=== Top half ===
==== Section 1 ====
First round

Second round

Quarterfinals

1
- (Netherlands) E Muskens
- (Netherlands) S Piek

BYE

1
- (Netherlands) E Muskens
- (Netherlands) S Piek
21
21

- (Australia) S Mapasa
- (Australia) G Somerville
9
11

- (Chinese Taipei) Hsu Y-c
- (Chinese Taipei) Pai Y-p
19
21
15

- (Australia) S Mapasa
- (Australia) G Somerville
21
15
21

1
- (Netherlands) E Muskens
- (Netherlands) S Piek
21
21

- (Japan) M Matsumoto
- (Japan) W Nagahara
19
17

- (Japan) M Matsumoto
- (Japan) W Nagahara

BYE

- (Japan) M Matsumoto
- (Japan) W Nagahara
21
21

- (Chinese Taipei) Hsieh P-c
- (Chinese Taipei) Wu T-j
15
13

- (Chinese Taipei) Hsieh P-c
- (Chinese Taipei) Wu T-j

- (Brazil) L Vicente
- (Brazil) L Vicente
w
/
o

==== Section 2 ====
First round

Second round

Quarterfinals

4
- (Germany) J Goliszewski
- (Germany) C Nelte

BYE

4
- (Germany) J Goliszewski
- (Germany) C Nelte
15
12

- (India) P Gadre
- (India) S Reddy
21
21

- (Dominican Republic) B Munoz
- (Dominican Republic) D Saturria
wo

- (India) P Gadre
- (India) S Reddy

- (India) P Gadre
- (India) S Reddy
18
25
15

- (Hong Kong) Poon LY
- (Hong Kong) Tse YS
21
23
21

- (Canada) J Chen
- (Canada) K O'Donoghue
9
8

- (Hong Kong) Poon LY
- (Hong Kong) Tse YS
21
21

- (Hong Kong) Poon LY
- (Hong Kong) Tse YS
21
21

- (Indonesia) K Dewi
- (Indonesia) V Marissa
9
12

- (Indonesia) K Dewi
- (Indonesia) V Marissa
21
15
21

- (England) H Olver
- (England) L Smith
17
21
9

=== Bottom half ===
==== Section 3 ====
First round

Second round

Quarterfinals

- (Hong Kong) Chan TK
- (Hong Kong) Yuen SY
21
21

- (China) Huang DP
- (China) Zhu MC
19
9

- (Hong Kong) Chan TK
- (Hong Kong) Yuen SY
22
21

- (Chinese Taipei) Cheng C-y
- (Chinese Taipei) Lee C-h
20
12

- (England) S Brown
- (England) K Robertshaw
wo

- (Chinese Taipei) Cheng C-y
- (Chinese Taipei) Lee C-h

- (Hong Kong) Chan TK
- (Hong Kong) Yuen SY
19
13

3
- (India) J Gutta
- (India) A Ponnappa
21
21

- (Chinese Taipei) Chiang K-h
- (Chinese Taipei) Wu F-c
20
15

- (Netherlands) S Barning
- (Netherlands) I Tabeling
22
21

- (Netherlands) S Barning
- (Netherlands) I Tabeling
21
16
17

3
- (India) J Gutta
- (India) A Ponnappa
16
21
21

BYE

3
- (India) J Gutta
- (India) A Ponnappa

==== Section 4 ====
First round

Second round

Quarterfinals

- (Canada) A Bruce
- (Canada) P Chan
13
17

- (Japan) S Tanaka
- (Japan) K Yonemoto
21
21

- (Japan) S Tanaka
- (Japan) K Yonemoto
21
21

- (United States) E Lee
- (United States) P Obanana
12
16

BYE

- (United States) E Lee
- (United States) P Obanana

- (Japan) S Tanaka
- (Japan) K Yonemoto
23
21
21

2
- (Japan) S Matsuo
- (Japan) M Naito
25
15
13

- (Germany) I Herttrich
- (Germany) B Michels

- (Brazil) P Pereira
- (Brazil) F Silva
wo

- (Germany) I Herttrich
- (Germany) B Michels
17
16

2
- (Japan) S Matsuo
- (Japan) M Naito
21
21

BYE

2
- (Japan) S Matsuo
- (Japan) M Naito

== Mixed doubles ==
=== Seeds ===
1. (Germany) Michael Fuchs / Birgit Michels (semi-final)
2. (Hong Kong) Lee Chun Hei / Chau Hoi Wah (champion)
3. (Netherlands) Jacco Arends / Selena Piek (semi-final)
4. (Hong Kong) Chan Yun Lung / Tse Ying Suet (second round)
5. (Netherlands) Jorrit de Ruiter / Samantha Barning (quarter-final)
6. (United States) Phillip Chew / Jamie Subandhi (first round)
7. (Canada) Toby Ng / Alex Bruce (second round)
8. (Indonesia) Fran Kurniawan / Komala Dewi (first round)

=== Finals ===
Semifinals

Final

1
- (Germany) Michael Fuchs
- (Germany) Birgit Michels
12
21
22

- (Indonesia) Andrei Adistia
- (Indonesia) Vita Marissa
21
16
24

- (Indonesia) Andrei Adistia
- (Indonesia) Vita Marissa
16
18

2
- (Hong Kong) Lee Chun Hei
- (Hong Kong) Chau Hoi Wah
21
21

3
- (Netherlands) Jacco Arends
- (Netherlands) Selena Piek
12
17

2
- (Hong Kong) Lee Chun Hei
- (Hong Kong) Chau Hoi Wah
21
21

=== Top half ===
==== Section 1 ====
First round

Second round

Quarterfinals

1
- (Germany) M Fuchs
- (Germany) B Michels
21
21

- (India) T Kona
- (India) S Reddy
15
15

1
- (Germany) M Fuchs
- (Germany) B Michels
21
21

Q4
- (Chinese Taipei) Wu H-l
- (Chinese Taipei) Hsieh P-c
10
11

Q1
- (Canada) A Bauer
- (Canada) J Chen
13
12

Q4
- (Chinese Taipei) Wu H-l
- (Chinese Taipei) Hsieh P-c
21
21

1
- (Germany) M Fuchs
- (Germany) B Michels
21
21

5
- (Netherlands) J de Ruiter
- (Netherlands) S Barning
15
12

5
- (Netherlands) J de Ruiter
- (Netherlands) S Barning
18
21
21

- (Canada) N Yakura
- (Canada) B Tam
21
15
18

5
- (Netherlands) J de Ruiter
- (Netherlands) S Barning
22
15
21

- (France) R Labar
- (France) E Lefel
20
21
12

- (Australia) S Serasinghe
- (Australia) S Mapasa
21
14
15

- (France) R Labar
- (France) E Lefel
15
21
21

==== Section 2 ====
First round

Second round

Quarterfinals

4
- (Hong Kong) Chan YL
- (Hong Kong) Tse YS
21
21

PFQ
- (Chinese Taipei) Liang J-w
- (Chinese Taipei) Cheng C-y
16
19

4
- (Hong Kong) Chan YL
- (Hong Kong) Tse YS
19
21
17

- (Chinese Taipei) Liao M-c
- (Chinese Taipei) Chen H-h
21
13
21

- (Chinese Taipei) Liao M-c
- (Chinese Taipei) Chen H-h
21
21

- (Australia) M Chau
- (Australia) G Somerville
19
8

- (Chinese Taipei) Liao M-c
- (Chinese Taipei) Chen H-h
14
21
14

- (Indonesia) A Adistia
- (Indonesia) V Marissa
21
18
21

6
- (United States) P Chew
- (United States) J Subandhi
18
20

- (Indonesia) A Adistia
- (Indonesia) V Marissa
21
22

- (Indonesia) A Adistia
- (Indonesia) V Marissa
21
21

- (Germany) M Lamsfuss
- (Germany) I Herttrich
12
18

- (Germany) M Lamsfuss
- (Germany) I Herttrich
21
21

- (Canada) P Charron
- (Canada) P Chan
11
9

=== Bottom half ===
==== Section 3 ====
First round

Second round

Quarterfinals

- (Sweden) N Ruponen
- (Sweden) A Hogstrom
11
13

- (Australia) R Middleton
- (Australia) L Choo
21
21

- (Australia) R Middleton
- (Australia) L Choo
8
14

- (Chinese Taipei) Lin C-y
- (Chinese Taipei) Wu T-j
21
21

- (Chinese Taipei) Lin C-y
- (Chinese Taipei) Wu T-j
21
21

8
- (Indonesia) F Kurniawan
- (Indonesia) K Dewi
12
17

- (Chinese Taipei) Lin C-y
- (Chinese Taipei) Wu T-j
18
14

3
- (Netherlands) J Arends
- (Netherlands) S Piek
21
21

PFQ
- (Chinese Taipei) Lu C-p
- (Chinese Taipei) Lee C-h
17
11

- (Germany) P Kaesbauer
- (Germany) C Nelte
21
21

- (Germany) P Kaesbauer
- (Germany) C Nelte
17
24
19

3
- (Netherlands) J Arends
- (Netherlands) S Piek
21
22
21

- (Hong Kong) Tang CM
- (Hong Kong) Poon LY
14
21
15

3
- (Netherlands) J Arends
- (Netherlands) S Piek
21
17
21

==== Section 4 ====
First round

Second round

Quarterfinals

- (United States) H Shu
- (United States) E Lee
15
16

Q2
- (Chinese Taipei) Lee Y
- (Chinese Taipei) Wu F-c
21
21

Q2
- (Chinese Taipei) Lee Y
- (Chinese Taipei) Wu F-c
22
21

7
- (Canada) T Ng
- (Canada) A Bruce
20
17

Q3
- (France) B Careme
- (Switzerland) S Jaquet
19
22
15

7
- (Canada) T Ng
- (Canada) A Bruce
21
20
21

Q2
- (Chinese Taipei) Lee Y
- (Chinese Taipei) Wu F-c
12
11

2
- (Hong Kong) Lee CH
- (Hong Kong) Chau HW
21
21

- (Canada) K Li
- (Canada) R Honderich
13
10

- (China) Huang KX
- (China) Huang DP
21
21

- (China) Huang KX
- (China) Huang DP
22
20
19

2
- (Hong Kong) Lee CH
- (Hong Kong) Chau HW
20
22
21

- (Chinese Taipei) Chang K-c
- (Chinese Taipei) Chang H-t
8
12

2
- (Hong Kong) Lee CH
- (Hong Kong) Chau HW
21
21

| Preceded by 2015 U.S. Open Grand Prix Gold | BWF Grand Prix and Grand Prix Gold; 2015 BWF season | Succeeded by 2015 Chinese Taipei Open Grand Prix Gold |
