= 2014 European Badminton Championships =

Tournament details
- Dates: 23–27 April 2014
- Venue: Gymnastics Center Kazan
- Location: Kazan, Russia

Champions
- Men's singles: (Denmark) Jan Ø. Jørgensen
- Women's singles: (Spain) Carolina Marín
- Men's doubles: (Russia) Vladimir Ivanov (Russia) Ivan Sozonov
- Women's doubles: (Denmark) Christinna Pedersen (Denmark) Kamilla Rytter Juhl
- Mixed doubles: (Denmark) Joachim Fischer Nielsen (Denmark) Christinna Pedersen

The 2014 European Badminton Championships were the 24th tournament of the European Badminton Championships. They were held in Kazan, Russia, from April 23 to April 27, 2014. The competitions were held in the Gymnastics Center.

== Medalists ==
Event	Gold	Silver	Bronze
Men's singles	Jan Ø. Jørgensen (DEN)	Rajiv Ouseph (ENG)	Viktor Axelsen (DEN)
Men's singles	Jan Ø. Jørgensen (DEN)	Rajiv Ouseph (ENG)	Vladimir Ivanov (RUS)
Women's singles	Carolina Marín (ESP)	Anna Thea Madsen (DEN)	Karin Schnaase (GER)
Women's singles	Carolina Marín (ESP)	Anna Thea Madsen (DEN)	Özge Bayrak (TUR)
Men's doubles	Vladimir Ivanov (RUS); Ivan Sozonov (RUS)	Mads Conrad-Petersen (DEN); Mads Pieler Kolding (DEN)	Mathias Boe (DEN); Carsten Mogensen (DEN)
Men's doubles	Vladimir Ivanov (RUS); Ivan Sozonov (RUS)	Mads Conrad-Petersen (DEN); Mads Pieler Kolding (DEN)	Chris Adcock (ENG); Andrew Ellis (ENG)
Women's doubles	Christinna Pedersen (DEN); Kamilla Rytter Juhl (DEN)	Line Damkjaer Kruse (DEN); Marie Roepke (DEN)	Imogen Bankier (SCO); Petya Nedelcheva (BUL)
Women's doubles	Christinna Pedersen (DEN); Kamilla Rytter Juhl (DEN)	Line Damkjaer Kruse (DEN); Marie Roepke (DEN)	Eefje Muskens (NED); Selena Piek (NED)
Mixed doubles	Joachim Fischer Nielsen (DEN); Christinna Pedersen (DEN)	Mads Pieler Kolding (DEN); Kamilla Rytter Juhl (DEN)	Jorrit de Ruiter (NED); Samantha Barning (NED)
Mixed doubles	Joachim Fischer Nielsen (DEN); Christinna Pedersen (DEN)	Mads Pieler Kolding (DEN); Kamilla Rytter Juhl (DEN)	Anders Kristiansen (DEN); Julie Houmann (DEN)

== Men's singles ==
=== Seeds ===
1. (Denmark) Jan Ø. Jørgensen
2. (Germany) Marc Zwiebler (Round 2)
3. (Denmark) Hans-Kristian Vittinghus
4. (Denmark) Viktor Axelsen
5. (England) Rajiv Ouseph
6. (Netherlands) Eric Pang
7. (France) Brice Leverdez
8. (Finland) Ville Lång (Round 2)

=== Wild cards ===
1. (Russia) Anton Ivanov

=== Finals ===
Quarterfinals
1	(Denmark) Jan Ø. Jørgensen	21	19	21
7	(France) Brice Leverdez	14	21	12
4	(Denmark) Viktor Axelsen	21	21
(Russia) Vladimir Malkov	9	18
5	(England) Rajiv Ouseph	15	21	21
3	(Denmark) Hans-Kristian Vittinghus	21	15	11
6	(Netherlands) Eric Pang	15	9
(Russia) Vladimir Ivanov	21	21

Semifinals
1	(Denmark) Jan Ø. Jørgensen	21	21
4	(Denmark) Viktor Axelsen	11	13
5	(England) Rajiv Ouseph	25	13	21
(Russia) Vladimir Ivanov	23	21	8

Final
1	(Denmark) Jan Ø. Jørgensen	21	21
5	(England) Rajiv Ouseph	18	10

=== Section 1 ===
First Round
1	(Denmark) Jan Ø. Jørgensen
Bye
(Malta) Samuel Calì	6	9
(Poland) Michał Rogalski	21	21
(Belarus) Vladzislav Kushnir
Bye
(Germany) Dieter Domke	21	21
(Wales) Daniel Font	10	19
7	(France) Brice Leverdez
Bye
(Hungary) Gergely Krausz	21	21
(Switzerland) Anthony Dumartheray	16	14
(Netherlands) Erik Meijs
Bye
(Lithuania) Kęstutis Navickas	21	21
(Estonia) Raul Must	7	18

Second Round
1	(Denmark) Jan Ø. Jørgensen	21	21
(Poland) Michał Rogalski	19	10
(Belarus) Vladzislav Kushnir	10	8
(Germany) Dieter Domke	21	21
7	(France) Brice Leverdez	21	21
(Hungary) Gergely Krausz	9	16
(Netherlands) Erik Meijs	21	16	19
(Lithuania) Kęstutis Navickas	13	21	21

Third Round
1	(Denmark) Jan Ø. Jørgensen	12	21	23
14	(Germany) Dieter Domke	21	14	21
7	(France) Brice Leverdez	21	21	16
(Lithuania) Kęstutis Navickas	12	23	11^{r}

Quarterfinals
1	(Denmark) Jan Ø. Jørgensen
7	(France) Brice Leverdez

=== Section 2 ===
First Round
4	(Denmark) Viktor Axelsen
Bye
(Republic of Ireland) Scott Evans	21	21
(Serbia) Ilija Pavlović	6	9
(Ukraine) Valeriy Atrashchenkov
Bye
(Sweden) Henri Hurskainen	14	21	9
(Belgium) Yuhan Tan	21	18	21
8	(Finland) Ville Lång
Bye
(Austria) David Obernosterer	19	21	7
(Russia) Vladimir Malkov	21	18	21
(Czech Republic) Petr Koukal
Bye
(Greece) Georgios Charalambidis	7	17
(England) Toby Penty	21	21

Second Round
4	(Denmark) Viktor Axelsen	21	20	21
(Republic of Ireland) Scott Evans	13	22	11
(Ukraine) Valeriy Atrashchenkov	17	21	13
(Belgium) Yuhan Tan	21	8	21
8	(Finland) Ville Lång	12	19
(Russia) Vladimir Malkov	21	21
(Czech Republic) Petr Koukal	21	14	21
3	(England) Toby Penty	11	21	13

Third Round
4	(Denmark) Viktor Axelsen	21	21
13	(Belgium) Yuhan Tan	17	16
(Russia) Vladimir Malkov	21	21
(Czech Republic) Petr Koukal	13	17

Quarterfinals
4	(Denmark) Viktor Axelsen
(Russia) Vladimir Malkov

=== Section 3 ===
First Round
(Ukraine) Dmytro Zavadsky	21	21
(Sweden) Gabriel Ulldahl	17	18
Bye
(Azerbaijan) Kanan Rzayev
WC	(Russia) Anton Ivanov	7	21	26
(Finland) Eetu Heino	21	16	24
Bye
5	(England) Rajiv Ouseph
(Slovenia) Iztok Utroša	19	21	14
(Austria) Michael Lahnsteiner	21	13	21
Bye
(France) Lucas Corvée
(Israel) Misha Zilberman	21	21
(Croatia) Zvonimir Đurkinjak	19	13
Bye
3	(Denmark) Hans-Kristian Vittinghus

Second Round
(Ukraine) Dmytro Zavadsky	21	21
(Azerbaijan) Kanan Rzayev	3	5
WC	(Russia) Anton Ivanov	6	14
5	(England) Rajiv Ouseph	21	21
(Austria) Michael Lahnsteiner	24	22	14
(France) Lucas Corvée	26	20	21
(Israel) Misha Zilberman	13	13
7	(Denmark) Hans-Kristian Vittinghus	21	21

Third Round
(Ukraine) Dmytro Zavadsky	17	16
5	(England) Rajiv Ouseph	21	21
(France) Lucas Corvée	17	15	10
3	(Denmark) Hans-Kristian Vittinghus	21	21

Quarterfinals
5	(England) Rajiv Ouseph
3	(Denmark) Hans-Kristian Vittinghus

=== Section 4 ===
First Round
(Norway) Marius Myhre	9	5
(Spain) Pablo Abián	21	21
Bye
(Bulgaria) Blagovest Kisyov
(Portugal) Nuno Santos	17	16
(Italy) Giovanni Greco	21	21
Bye
6	(Netherlands) Eric Pang
(France) Thomas Rouxel	18	15
(Belgium) Maxime Moreels	21	21
Bye
(Slovakia) Jarolím Vícen
(Russia) Vladimir Ivanov	21	21
(Czech Republic) Jan Fröhlich	12	17
Bye
2	(Germany) Marc Zwiebler

Second Round
(Spain) Pablo Abián	21	21
(Bulgaria) Blagovest Kisyov	14	18
(Italy) Giovanni Greco	11	21	9
6	(Netherlands) Eric Pang	21	13	21
(Belgium) Maxime Moreels	23	21
(Slovakia) Jarolím Vícen	21	19
(Russia) Vladimir Ivanov	21	24
2	(Germany) Marc Zwiebler	14	22

Third Round
(Spain) Pablo Abián	21	13	14
6	(Netherlands) Eric Pang	16	21	21
(Belgium) Maxime Moreels	9	8
(Russia) Vladimir Ivanov	21	21

Quarterfinals
6	(Netherlands) Eric Pang
(Russia) Vladimir Ivanov

== Women's singles ==
=== Seeds ===
1. (Spain) Carolina Marín
2. (Scotland) Kirsty Gilmour (Round 3)
3. (Spain) Beatriz Corrales (Round 2)
4. (Bulgaria) Linda Zetchiri (Round 3)
5. (Czech Republic) Kristína Gavnholt
6. (France) Sashina Vignes Waran (Round 3)
7. (Republic of Ireland) Chloe Magee (Round 3)
8. (Bulgaria) Petya Nedelcheva (Round 3)

=== Finals ===
Quarterfinals
1	(Spain) Carolina Marín	21	21
(Bulgaria) Stefani Stoeva	10	15
(Germany) Karin Schnaase	21	21
(Denmark) Line Kjærsfeldt	18	15
(Denmark) Anna Thea Madsen	21	21
(Russia) Olga Golovanova	9	12
5	(Czech Republic) Kristína Gavnholt	10	15
(Turkey) Özge Bayrak	21	21

Semifinals
1	(Spain) Carolina Marín	21	21
(Germany) Karin Schnaase	12	9
(Denmark) Anna Thea Madsen	21	21
(Turkey) Özge Bayrak	10	14

Final
1	(Spain) Carolina Marín	21	14	21
(Denmark) Anna Thea Madsen	9	21	8

=== Section 1 ===
First Round
1	(Spain) Carolina Marín
Bye
(Hungary) Laura Sárosi
Bye
(Estonia) Laura Vana
Bye
(Russia) Natalia Perminova	21	21
(Serbia) Milica Simić	14	10
7	(Republic of Ireland) Chloe Magee
Bye
(Switzerland) Sabrina Jaquet	24	21
(Poland) Anna Narel	22	18
(Malta) Sadowski Fiorella Marie
Bye
(Bulgaria) Stefani Stoeva	21	21
(Belgium) Marie Demy	12	14

Second Round
1	(Spain) Carolina Marín	21	21
(Hungary) Laura Sárosi	15	16
(Estonia) Laura Vana	24	11	12
(Russia) Natalia Perminova	22	21	21
7	(Republic of Ireland) Chloe Magee	16	23	28
(Switzerland) Sabrina Jaquet	21	21	26
(Malta) Sadowski Fiorella Marie	5	6
(Bulgaria) Stefani Stoeva	21	21

Third Round
1	(Spain) Carolina Marín	21	21
(Russia) Natalia Perminova	13	12
7	(Republic of Ireland) Chloe Magee	15	16
(Bulgaria) Stefani Stoeva	21	21

Quarterfinals
1	(Spain) Carolina Marín
(Bulgaria) Stefani Stoeva

=== Section 2 ===
First Round
4	(Bulgaria) Linda Zetchiri
Bye
(England) Fontaine Mica Chapman	21	21	21
(Czech Republic) Zuzana Pavelcová	23	19	17
(Slovakia) Jana Ciznarova
Bye
WC	(Russia) Ella Diehl	14	21	15
(Germany) Karin Schnaase	21	18	21
6	(France) Sashina Vignes Waran
Bye
(Netherlands) Soraya de Visch Eijbergen	21	17	18
(Ukraine) Marija Ulitina	14	21	21
(Denmark) Line Kjærsfeldt
Bye
(Greece) Ioanna Karkantzia	8	15
(Croatia) Maja Pavlinic	21	21

Second Round
4	(Bulgaria) Linda Zetchiri	21	21
(England) Fontaine Mica Chapman	7	14
(Slovakia) Jana Ciznarova	7	8
13	(Germany) Karin Schnaase	21	21
6	(France) Sashina Vignes Waran	21	21
(Ukraine) Marija Ulitina	17	12
(Denmark) Line Kjærsfeldt	21	21
(Croatia) Maja Pavlinic	13	5

Third Round
4	(Bulgaria) Linda Zetchiri	10	15
(Germany) Karin Schnaase	21	21
(France) Sashina Vignes Waran	20	25
(Denmark) Line Kjærsfeldt	22	27

Quarterfinals
(Germany) Karin Schnaase
(Denmark) Line Kjærsfeldt

=== Section 3 ===
First Round
(Italy) Claudia Gruber	10	17
(Denmark) Anna Thea Madsen	21	21
Bye
(Austria) Alexandra Mathis
(Sweden) Matilda Petersen	18	21	17
(Ukraine) Natalya Voytsekh	21	13	21
Bye
8	(Bulgaria) Petya Nedelcheva
(France) Perrine Le Buhanic	10	21	12
(Russia) Olga Golovanova	21	18	21
Bye
(Denmark) Sandra-Maria Jensen
(Lithuania) Akvilė Stapušaitytė	21	17	17
(Russia) Ksenia Polikarpova	13	21	21
Bye
3	(Spain) Beatriz Corrales

Second Round
(Denmark) Anna Thea Madsen	21	23
(Austria) Alexandra Mathis	16	21
(Ukraine) Natalya Voytsekh	21	8	9
8	(Bulgaria) Petya Nedelcheva	15	21	21
(Russia) Olga Golovanova	21	21
(Denmark) Sandra-Maria Jensen	9	16
(Russia) Ksenia Polikarpova	21	21
3	(Spain) Beatriz Corrales	17	14

Third Round
(Denmark) Anna Thea Madsen	21	21
8	(Bulgaria) Petya Nedelcheva	19	14
(Russia) Olga Golovanova	21	21
(Russia) Ksenia Polikarpova	19	14

Quarterfinals
(Denmark) Anna Thea Madsen
(Russia) Olga Golovanova

=== Section 4 ===
First Round
(Finland) Nanna Vainio	21	12	6
(Belgium) Lianne Tan	17	21	21
Bye
(England) Sarah Walker
(Azerbaijan) Alizada Parvin	2	1
(Wales) Carissa Turner	21	21
Bye
5	(Czech Republic) Kristína Gavnholt
(Turkey) Özge Bayrak	17	23	21
(Belarus) Alesia Zaitsava	21	21	15
Bye
(Latvia) Monika Radovska
Bye
(Slovenia) Maja Tvrdy
Bye
2	(Scotland) Kirsty Gilmour

Second Round
(Belgium) Lianne Tan	27	21
(England) Sarah Walker	25	18
(Wales) Carissa Turner	13	6
5	(Czech Republic) Kristína Gavnholt	21	21
(Turkey) Özge Bayrak	21	21
(Latvia) Monika Radovska	11	5
(Slovenia) Maja Tvrdy	0^{r}
2	(Scotland) Kirsty Gilmour	2

Third Round
(Belgium) Lianne Tan	16	12
5	(Czech Republic) Kristína Gavnholt	21	21
(Turkey) Özge Bayrak	21	21
2	(Scotland) Kirsty Gilmour	13	19

Quarterfinals
5	(Czech Republic) Kristína Gavnholt
(Turkey) Özge Bayrak

== Men's doubles ==
=== Seeds ===
1. (Denmark) Mathias Boe/Carsten Mogensen
2. (England) Chris Adcock/Andrew Ellis
3. (Russia) Vladimir Ivanov/Ivan Sozonov
4. (Denmark) Mads Conrad-Petersen/Mads Pieler Kolding

=== Finals ===
Semifinals
1	(Denmark) Mathias Boe (Denmark) Carsten Mogensen	19	21	18
3	(Russia) Vladimir Ivanov (Russia) Ivan Sozonov	21	18	21
4	(Denmark) Mads Conrad-Petersen (Denmark) Mads Pieler Kolding	21	19	21
2	(England) Chris Adcock (England) Andrew Ellis	16	21	8

Final
3	(Russia) Vladimir Ivanov (Russia) Ivan Sozonov	21	21
4	(Denmark) Mads Conrad-Petersen (Denmark) Mads Pieler Kolding	13	16

=== Section 1 ===
First Round
1	(Denmark) Mathias Boe (Denmark) Carsten Mogensen
Bye
(Slovenia) Kek Jamnik (Slovenia) Alen Roj	11	11
(England) Chris Coles (England) Matt Nottingham	21	21
(Germany) Michael Fuchs (Germany) Johannes Schöttler	21	21
(Czech Republic) Jan Fröhlich (Czech Republic) Zdeněk Sváta	7	10
(Republic of Ireland) Jonathan Dolan (Republic of Ireland) Sam McGee	21	17	19
(Netherlands) Jacco Arends (Netherlands) Jelle Maas	13	21	21
3	(Russia) Vladimir Ivanov (Russia) Ivan Sozonov	21	21
(France) Laurent Constantin (France) Matthieu Lo Ying Ping	10	6
(Belgium) Matijs Dierickx (Belgium) Freek Golinski	12	6
(Poland) Adam Cwalina (Poland) Przemysław Wacha	21	21
WC	(Russia) Andrej Ashmarin (Russia) Vitalij Durkin	14	21	15
(England) Chris Langridge (England) Peter Mills	21	14	21
(Denmark) Anders Skaarup Rasmussen (Denmark) Kim Astrup Sørensen	21	21
(Switzerland) Anthony Dumartheray (Switzerland) Thomas Heiniger	11	11

Second Round
1	(Denmark) Mathias Boe (Denmark) Carsten Mogensen	21	21
(England) Chris Coles (England) Matt Nottingham	10	13
(Germany) Michael Fuchs (Germany) Johannes Schöttler	21	21
(Netherlands) Jacco Arends (Netherlands) Jelle Maas	18	15
3	(Russia) Vladimir Ivanov (Russia) Ivan Sozonov	21	13	21
(Poland) Adam Cwalina (Poland) Przemysław Wacha	19	21	19
(England) Chris Langridge (England) Peter Mills	22	21
(Denmark) Anders Skaarup Rasmussen (Denmark) Kim Astrup Sørensen	20	16

Quarterfinals
1	(Denmark) Mathias Boe (Denmark) Carsten Mogensen	22	21
(Germany) Michael Fuchs (Germany) Johannes Schöttler	20	19
3	(Russia) Vladimir Ivanov (Russia) Ivan Sozonov	21	16	21
(England) Chris Langridge (England) Peter Mills	14	21	18

Semifinals
1	(Denmark) Mathias Boe (Denmark) Carsten Mogensen
3	(Russia) Vladimir Ivanov (Russia) Ivan Sozonov

=== Section 2 ===
First Round
(Italy) Giovanni Greco (Italy) Rosario Maddaloni	20	21	23
(Czech Republic) Pavel Florián (Czech Republic) Ondřej Kopřiva	22	15	21
(Russia) Evgenij Dremin (Russia) Sergey Lunev	21	21
(Germany) Peter Käsbauer (Germany) Josche Zurwonne	17	13
(Scotland) Martin Campbell (Scotland) Patrick MacHugh	16	22	8
(France) Lucas Corvée (France) Brice Leverdez	21	20	21
(Poland) Łukasz Moreń (Poland) Wojciech Szkudlarczyk	19	17
4	(Denmark) Mads Conrad-Petersen (Denmark) Mads Pieler Kolding	21	21
(Lithuania) Povilas Bartušis (Lithuania) Alan Plavin	21	21
(Belarus) Vladzislav Kushnir (Belarus) Dzmitry Saidakou	16	14
(Russia) Nikita Khakimov (Russia) Vasily Kuznetsov	21	13	21
(Ukraine) Valeriy Atrashchenkov (Ukraine) Gennadiy Natarov	15	21	17
(Wales) Joe Morgan (Wales) Nic Strange	9	10
(Netherlands) Ruud Bosch (Netherlands) Koen Ridder	21	21
Bye
2	(England) Chris Adcock (England) Andrew Ellis

Second Round
(Italy) Giovanni Greco (Italy) Rosario Maddaloni	10	12
(Russia) Evgenij Dremin (Russia) Sergey Lunev	21	21
(France) Lucas Corvée (France) Brice Leverdez	16	13
4	(Denmark) Mads Conrad-Petersen (Denmark) Mads Pieler Kolding	21	21
(Lithuania) Povilas Bartušis (Lithuania) Alan Plavin	8	11
(Russia) Nikita Khakimov (Russia) Vasily Kuznetsov	21	21
(Netherlands) Ruud Bosch (Netherlands) Koen Ridder	25	12	18
2	(England) Chris Adcock (England) Andrew Ellis	23	21	21

Quarterfinals
1	(Russia) Evgenij Dremin (Russia) Sergey Lunev	9	13
4	(Denmark) Mads Conrad-Petersen (Denmark) Mads Pieler Kolding	21	21
11	(Russia) Nikita Khakimov (Russia) Vasily Kuznetsov	21	17	8
2	(England) Chris Adcock (England) Andrew Ellis	19	21	21

Semifinals
4	(Denmark) Mads Conrad-Petersen (Denmark) Mads Pieler Kolding
2	(England) Chris Adcock (England) Andrew Ellis

== Women's doubles ==
=== Seeds ===
1. (Denmark) Christinna Pedersen / Kamilla Rytter Juhl
2. (Netherlands) Eefje Muskens / Selena Piek
3. (Denmark) Line Damkjaer Kruse / Marie Roepke
4. (Scotland) Imogen Bankier / (Bulgaria) Petya Nedelcheva

=== Finals ===
Semifinals
1	(Denmark) Christinna Pedersen (Denmark) Kamilla Rytter Juhl	12	21	21
4	(Scotland) Imogen Bankier (Bulgaria) Petya Nedelcheva	21	13	7
3	(Denmark) Line Damkjaer Kruse (Denmark) Marie Roepke	25	21
2	(Netherlands) Eefje Muskens (Netherlands) Selena Piek	23	11

Final
1	(Denmark) Christinna Pedersen; Kamilla Rytter Juhl	21	21
3	(Denmark) Line Damkjaer Kruse (Denmark) Marie Roepke	11	11

=== Sector 1 ===
First Round
1	(Denmark) Christinna Pedersen (Denmark) Kamilla Rytter Juhl
Bye
(Turkey) Özge Bayrak (Turkey) Neslihan Yiğit
(Russia) Tatjana Bibik (Russia) Ekaterina Bolotova	w/o
(Russia) Irina Khlebko (Russia) Ksenia Polikarpova
Bye
(England) Gabrielle Adcock (England) Lauren Smith	21	21
(Republic of Ireland) Caroline Black (Republic of Ireland) Sinead Chambers	12	7
4	(Scotland) Imogen Bankier (Bulgaria) Petya Nedelcheva
Bye
(France) Audrey Fontaine (France) Emilie Lefel	21	21
(Wales) Sarah Thomas (Wales) Carissa Turner	14	8
(Greece) Panagiota Dimitra Aslanidou (Greece) Irina Tenta
bye
(Netherlands) Samantha Barning (Netherlands) Iris Tabeling
(Germany) Johanna Goliszewski (Germany) Birgit Michels	w/o

Second Round
1	(Denmark) Christinna Pedersen (Denmark) Kamilla Rytter Juhl	21	21
(Turkey) Özge Bayrak (Turkey) Neslihan Yiğit	6	12
(Russia) Irina Khlebko (Russia) Ksenia Polikarpova	14	18
(England) Gabrielle Adcock (England) Lauren Smith	21	21
4	(Scotland) Imogen Bankier (Bulgaria) Petya Nedelcheva	21	21
(France) Audrey Fontaine (France) Emilie Lefel	13	13
(Greece) Panagiota Dimitra Aslanidou (Greece) Irina Tenta	1	5
(Netherlands) Samantha Barning (Netherlands) Iris Tabeling	21	21

Quarterfinals
1	(Denmark) Christinna Pedersen (Denmark) Kamilla Rytter Juhl	21	21
(England) Gabrielle Adcock (England) Lauren Smith	13	13
4	(Scotland) Imogen Bankier (Bulgaria) Petya Nedelcheva	21	21
(Netherlands) Samantha Barning (Netherlands) Iris Tabeling	11	8

Semifinals
1	(Denmark) Christinna Pedersen (Denmark) Kamilla Rytter Juhl
4	(Scotland) Imogen Bankier (Bulgaria) Petya Nedelcheva

=== Sector 2 ===
First Round
WC	(Russia) Olga Golovanova (Russia) Viktoriia Vorobeva	21	21
(England) Heather Olver (England) Kate Robertshaw	15	17
Bye
(France) Lorraine Baumann (France) Teshana Vignes Waran
(Russia) Anastasia Chervaykova (Russia) Nina Vislova
(Belgium) Steffi Annys (Belgium) Severine Corvilain	w/o
Bye
3	(Denmark) Line Damkjær Kruse (Denmark) Marie Røpke
(Bulgaria) Gabriela Stoeva (Bulgaria) Stefani Stoeva	21	21	21
(Finland) Mathilda Lindholm (Finland) Jenny Nyström	23	13	16
Bye
(Ukraine) Natalya Voytsekh (Ukraine) Yelyzaveta Zharka
(Germany) Isabel Herttrich (Germany) Carla Nelte	14	21	15
(Switzerland) Ayla Huser (Switzerland) Sabrina Jaquet	21	14	21
Bye
2	(Netherlands) Eefje Muskens (Netherlands) Selena Piek

Second Round
WC	(Russia) Olga Golovanova (Russia) Viktoriia Vorobeva	21	18	21
(France) Lorraine Baumann (France) Teshana Vignes Waran	14	21	11
(Russia) Anastasia Chervaykova (Russia) Nina Vislova	16	18
3	(Denmark) Line Damkjær Kruse (Denmark) Marie Røpke	21	21
(Bulgaria) Gabriela Stoeva (Bulgaria) Stefani Stoeva	21	20	21
(Ukraine) Natalya Voytsekh (Ukraine) Yelyzaveta Zharka	15	22	18
(Germany) Isabel Herttrich (Germany) Carla Nelte	11	10
2	(Netherlands) Eefje Muskens (Netherlands) Selena Piek	21	21

Quarterfinals
WC	(Russia) Olga Golovanova (Russia) Viktoriia Vorobeva	9	15
3	(Denmark) Line Damkjær Kruse (Denmark) Marie Røpke	21	21
(Bulgaria) Gabriela Stoeva (Bulgaria) Stefani Stoeva	23	15
2	(Netherlands) Eefje Muskens (Netherlands) Selena Piek	25	21

Semifinals
3	(Denmark) Line Damkjær Kruse (Denmark) Marie Røpke
2	(Netherlands) Eefje Muskens (Netherlands) Selena Piek

== Mixed doubles ==
=== Seeds ===
1. (Denmark) Joachim Fischer Nielsen / Christinna Pedersen
2. (England) Chris Adcock / Gabrielle Adcock
3. (Germany) Michael Fuchs / Birgit Michels
4. (Scotland) Robert Blair / Imogen Bankier

=== Finals ===
Semifinals
1	(Denmark) Joachim Fischer Nielsen (Denmark) Christinna Pedersen	21	21
(Netherlands) Jorrit de Ruiter (Netherlands) Samantha Barning	12	8
(Denmark) Mads Pieler Kolding (Denmark) Kamilla Rytter Juhl	21	21
(Denmark) Anders Kristiansen (Denmark) Julie Houmann	14	17

Final
1	(Denmark) Joachim Fischer Nielsen (Denmark) Christinna Pedersen	22	21	21
(Denmark) Mads Pieler Kolding (Denmark) Kamilla Rytter Juhl	24	13	18

=== Sector 1 ===
First Round
WC	(Denmark) Joachim Fischer Nielsen (Denmark) Christinna Pedersen
Bye
(Czech Republic) Jakub Bitman (Czech Republic) Alžběta Bášová	9	18
(Republic of Ireland) Sam Magee (Republic of Ireland) Chloe Magee	21	21
(England) Chris Langridge (England) Heather Olver	21	21
(Hungary) Gergely Krausz (Hungary) Laura Sárosi	8	7
(Finland) Anton Kaisti (Finland) Jenny Nyström	15	12
(Germany) Max Schwenger (Germany) Carla Nelte	21	21
3	(Germany) Michael Fuchs (Germany) Birgit Michels	w/o
(France) Baptiste Carême (France) Anne Tran
(Russia) Vitalij Durkin (Russia) Nina Vislova	21	21
(Sweden) Nico Ruponen (Sweden) Amanda Högström	18	7
(Netherlands) Jorrit de Ruiter (Netherlands) Samantha Barning	21	21
(England) Christopher Coles (England) Alyssa Lim	8	16
(Wales) Daniel Font (Wales) Sarah Thomas	21	21
(Malta) Samuel Cali (Malta) Sadowski Fiorella Marie	6	12

Second Round
1	(Denmark) Joachim Fischer Nielsen (Denmark) Christinna Pedersen	21	21
(Republic of Ireland) Sam Magee (Republic of Ireland) Chloe Magee	12	17
(England) Chris Langridge (England) Heather Olver	21	16	17
(Germany) Max Schwenger (Germany) Carla Nelte	13	21	21
(France) Baptiste Carême (France) Anne Tran	8	10
(Russia) Vitalij Durkin (Russia) Nina Vislova	21	21
(Netherlands) Jorrit de Ruiter (Netherlands) Samantha Barning	20	21	21
(Wales) Daniel Font (Wales) Sarah Thomas	22	13	10

Quarterfinals
1	(Denmark) Joachim Fischer Nielsen (Denmark) Christinna Pedersen	21	21
(Germany) Max Schwenger (Germany) Carla Nelte	11	12
(Russia) Vitalij Durkin (Russia) Nina Vislova	18	21	18
(Netherlands) Jorrit de Ruiter (Netherlands) Samantha Barning	21	16	21

Semifinals
1	(Denmark) Joachim Fischer Nielsen (Denmark) Christinna Pedersen
4	(Netherlands) Jorrit de Ruiter (Netherlands) Samantha Barning

=== Sector 2 ===
First Round
(Denmark) Mads Pieler Kolding (Denmark) Kamilla Rytter Juhl	21	21
(Ukraine) Gennadiy Natarov (Ukraine) Yuliya Kazarinova	14	14
(Croatia) Zvonimir Durkinjak (Croatia) Stasa Poznanovic	21	21
(Spain) Jesus Lorenzo (Spain) Maria Marquez Diaz	16	10
WC	(Russia) Anotoliy Yartsev (Russia) Evgeniya Kosetskaya	21	21
(Switzerland) Thomas Heiniger (Switzerland) Tiffany Zaugg	13	18
(Russia) Andrej Ashmarin (Russia) Ekaterina Bolotova	10	15
4	(Scotland) Robert Blair (Scotland) Imogen Bankier	21	21
(Poland) Robert Matusiak (Poland) Agnieszka Wojtkowska	21	21
(Netherlands) Jacco Arends (Netherlands) Selena Piek	14	10
(Austria) Roman Zirnwald (Austria) Elisabeth Baldauf	18	20
(Germany) Peter Kaesbauer (Germany) Isabel Herttrich	21	21
(Denmark) Anders Kristiansen (Denmark) Julie Houmann	11	21	21
(Sweden) Jonathan Nordh (Sweden) Emelie Lennartsson	21	12	15
(Israel) Misha Zilberman (Israel) Svetlana Zilberman	11	10
2	(England) Chris Adcock (England) Gabrielle Adcock	21	21

Second Round
(Denmark) Mads Pieler Kolding (Denmark) Kamilla Rytter Juhl	21	21
(Croatia) Zvonimir Durkinjak (Croatia) Stasa Poznanovic	10	10
WC	(Russia) Anotoliy Yartsev (Russia) Evgeniya Kosetskaya	15	18
4	(Scotland) Robert Blair (Scotland) Imogen Bankier	21	21
(Poland) Robert Matusiak (Poland) Agnieszka Wojtkowska	16	21	15
(Germany) Peter Kaesbauer (Germany) Isabel Herttrich	21	10	21
(Denmark) Anders Kristiansen (Denmark) Julie Houmann	12	21	21
2	(England) Chris Adcock (England) Gabrielle Adcock	21	18	12

Quarterfinals
(Denmark) Mads Pieler Kolding (Denmark) Kamilla Rytter Juhl	21	21
4	(Scotland) Robert Blair (Scotland) Imogen Bankier	14	18
(Germany) Peter Kaesbauer (Germany) Isabel Herttrich	15	21	19
(Denmark) Anders Kristiansen (Denmark) Julie Houmann	21	16	21

Semifinals
(Denmark) Mads Pieler Kolding (Denmark) Kamilla Rytter Juhl
(Denmark) Anders Kristiansen (Denmark) Julie Houmann
