= Anna Thea Madsen =

Danish badminton player (born 1994)

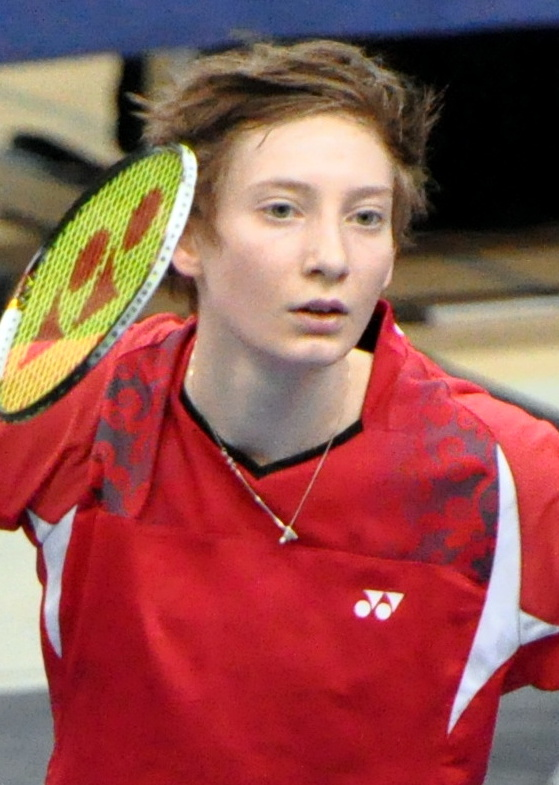
- Madsen in 2015

Personal information
- Born: 27 October 1994 (age 32) Copenhagen, Denmark
- Height: 1.62 m (5 ft 4 in)
- Weight: 57 kg (126 lb)

Sport
- Country: Denmark
- Sport: Badminton
- Handedness: Right
- Coached by: Tanja Berg; Per-Henrik Croona

Women's singles
- Highest ranking: 34 (26 March 2015)
- BWF profile
Medal record
Women's badminton
Representing Denmark
Sudirman Cup
Bronze medal – third place	2013 Kuala Lumpur	Mixed team
European Championships
Silver medal – second place	2014 Kazan	Women's singles
Bronze medal – third place	2016 La Roche-sur-Yon	Women's singles
European Mixed Team Championships
Gold medal – first place	2015 Leuven	Mixed team
Gold medal – first place	2017 Lubin	Mixed team
European Women's Team Championships
Gold medal – first place	2014 Basel	Women's team
Gold medal – first place	2016 Kazan	Women's team
European Junior Championships
Gold medal – first place	2013 Ankara	Mixed team
Bronze medal – third place	2011 Vantaa	Mixed team

Anna Thea Madsen (born 27 October 1994) is a Danish badminton player.

== Achievements ==
=== European Championships ===
Women's singles
Year	Venue	Opponent	Score	Result
2014	Gymnastics Center; Kazan, Russia	(Spain) Carolina Marín	9–21, 21–14, 8–21	Silver
2016	Vendéspace; La Roche-sur-Yon, France	(Scotland) Kirsty Gilmour	21–17, 18–21, 19–21	Bronze

=== BWF International Challenge/Series ===
Women singles
Year	Tournament	Opponent	Score	Result
2012	Denmark International	(Denmark) Sandra-Maria Jensen	19–21, 18–21	(silver) Runner-up
2014	Portugal International	(Denmark) Sandra-Maria Jensen	21–17, 21–23, 12–21	(silver) Runner-up
2014	Finnish Open	(Denmark) Line Kjærsfeldt	9–21, 3–12 retired	(silver) Runner-up
2015	Welsh International	(Germany) Karin Schnaase	24–22, 21–11	(gold) Winner
2016	Finnish Open	(Japan) Rira Kawashima	19–21, 25–23, 21–12	(gold) Winner
2017	Irish Open	(Netherlands) Soraya de Visch Eijbergen	21–13, 21–13	(gold) Winner
2018	Austrian International	(Thailand) Pattarasuda Chaiwan	23–21, 21–17	(gold) Winner
2018	Portugal International	(China) Qi Xuefei	15–21, 17–21	(silver) Runner-up

BWF International Challenge tournament
BWF International Series tournament
BWF Future Series tournament
