= Dave Khodabux =

Dutch badminton player (born 1985)

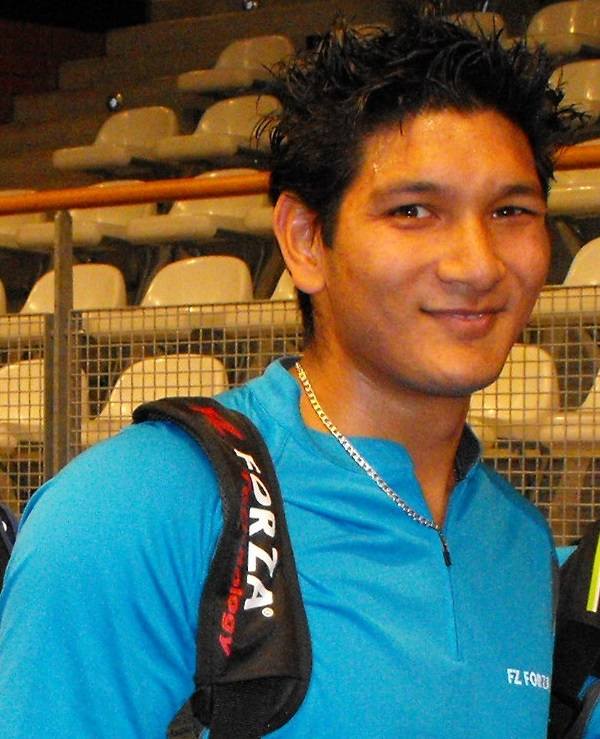

Personal information
- Born: 18 October 1985 (age 41)

Sport
- Country: Netherlands
- Sport: Badminton

Men's & mixed doubles
- Highest ranking: 33 (MD 10 January 2013); 37 (XD 26 August 2010)
- BWF profile
Medal record
Men's badminton
Representing Netherlands
European Junior Championships
Bronze medal – third place	2003 Esbjerg	Boys' doubles

Dave Khodabux (born 18 October 1985) is a Dutch retired badminton player, specializing in doubles play. He won a bronze medal at the 2003 European Junior Championships with his partner Ruud Bosch in the boys' doubles event. He won the Dutch National badminton title twice in the mixed doubles event, in 2010 with Samantha Barning and in 2012 with Selena Piek. Khodabux is from Surinamese origin, now a coach at his badminton club BV Almere.

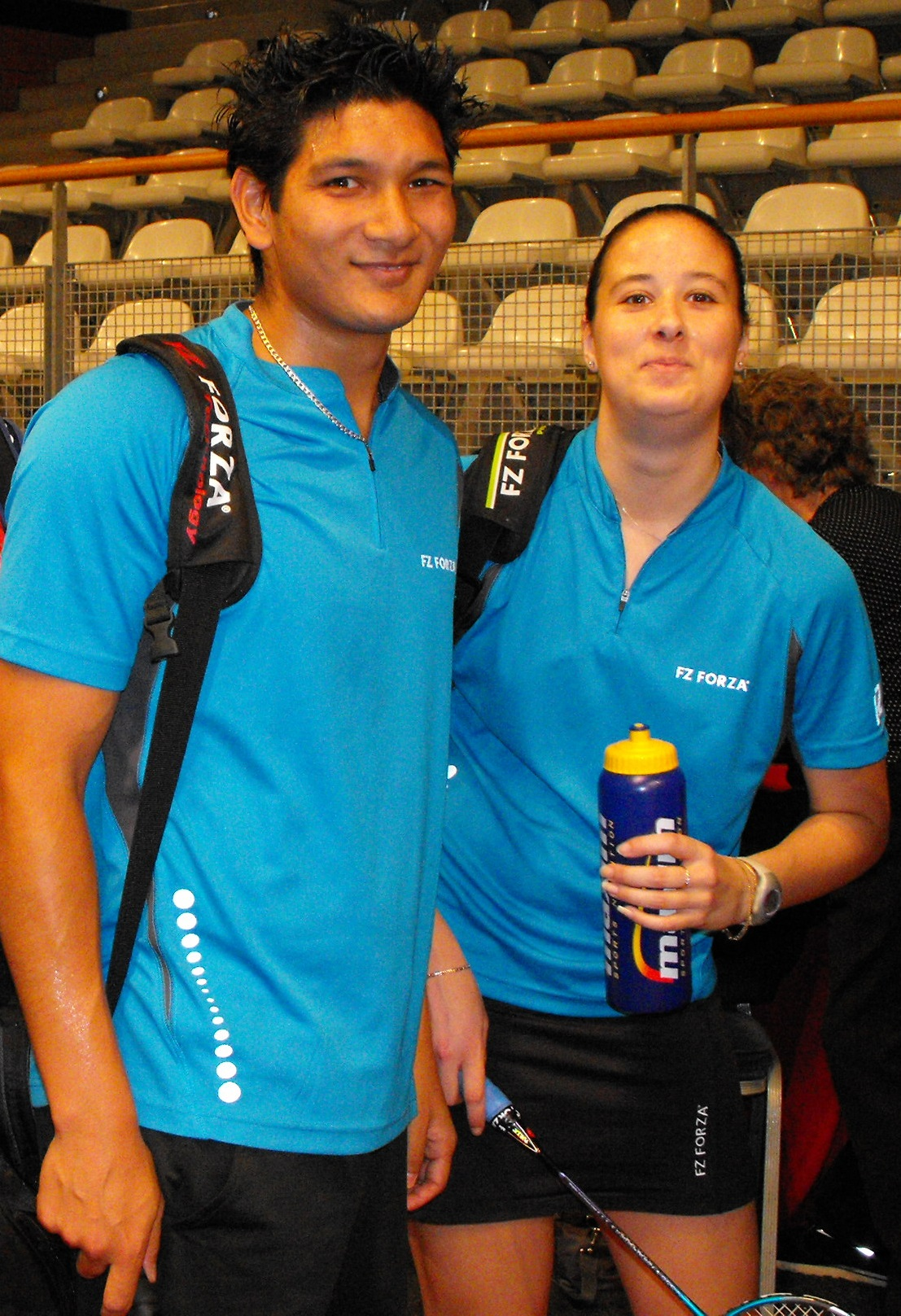
Dave Khodabux and Samantha Barning

== Achievements ==
=== European Junior Championships ===
Boys' doubles
Year	Venue	Partner	Opponent	Score	Result
2003	Esbjerg Badminton Center; Esbjerg, Denmark	(Netherlands) Ruud Bosch	(Denmark) Søren Frandsen (Denmark) Mads Hallas	5–15, 15–8, 6–15	Bronze

=== BWF International Challenge/Series ===
Men's doubles
Year	Tournament	Partner	Opponent	Score	Result
2011	Slovak Open	(Netherlands) Jorrit de Ruiter	(Poland) Łukasz Moreń (Poland) Wojciech Szkudlarczyk	21–10, 22–20	(gold) Winner
2012	Estonian International	(Netherlands) Jorrit de Ruiter	(France) Laurent Constantin (France) Sébastien Vincent	17–21, 21–19, 15–21	(silver) Runner-up
2012	Swedish Masters	(Netherlands) Jorrit de Ruiter	(Russia) Vladimir Ivanov (Russia) Ivan Sozonov	16–21, 9–21	(silver) Runner-up
2012	Dutch International	(Netherlands) Jorrit de Ruiter	(Malaysia) Nelson Heg (Malaysia) Teo Ee Yi	21–19, 13–21, 9–21	(silver) Runner-up
2012	Spanish International	(Netherlands) Jorrit de Ruiter	(Netherlands) Jacco Arends (Netherlands) Jelle Maas	21–16, 21–23, 21–13	(gold) Winner
2013	Suriname International	(Netherlands) Joris van Soerland	(Italy) Giovanni Greco (Italy) Rosario Maddaloni	21–14, 21–18	(gold) Winner

Mixed doubles
Year	Tournament	Partner	Opponent	Score	Result
2012	Swedish Masters	(Netherlands) Samantha Barning	(England) Robin Middleton (England) Heather Olver	21–15, 9–21, 14–21	(silver) Runner-up
2011	Slovak Open	(Netherlands) Selena Piek	(Poland) Wojciech Szkudlarczyk (Poland) Agnieszka Wojtkowska	21–13, 21–18	(gold) Winner
2011	Irish International	(Netherlands) Selena Piek	(England) Marcus Ellis (England) Heather Olver	19–21, 17–21	(silver) Runner-up
2012	Estonian International	(Netherlands) Selena Piek	(Netherlands) Jorrit de Ruiter (Netherlands) Samantha Barning	21–7, 21–12	(gold) Winner
2013	Suriname International	(Netherlands) Elisa Piek	(Suriname) Mitchel Wongsodikromo (Suriname) Crystal Leefmans	21–17, 18–21, 21–19	(gold) Winner

BWF International Challenge tournament
BWF International Series tournament
BWF Future Series tournament
