= Eefje Muskens =

Dutch badminton player (born 1989)

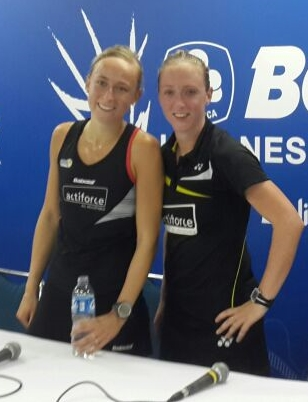
- Muskens (right) at the 2016 Indonesia Super Series Premier

Personal information
- Born: 17 June 1989 (age 37) Goirle, Netherlands
- Height: 1.64 m (5 ft 5 in)

Sport
- Country: Netherlands
- Sport: Badminton
- Handedness: Right

Women's & mixed doubles
- Highest ranking: 7 (WD, 11 February 2016)
- BWF profile
Medal record
Women's badminton
Representing Netherlands
European Championships
Silver medal – second place	2016 La Roche-sur-Yon	Women's doubles
Bronze medal – third place	2014 Kazan	Women's doubles
European Women's Team Championships
Silver medal – second place	2008 Almere	Women's team
European Junior Championships
Silver medal – second place	2007 Völklingen	Mixed team

Eefje Muskens (born 17 June 1989), is a Dutch former badminton player who specializes in doubles. Her last partner for women's doubles was Selena Piek. She won the 2014, 2015 and 2016 editions of Dutch National Badminton Championships with Piek. Prior to that she already won her first National title in 2013 with Samantha Barning. She won a silver medal at the 2016 European Badminton Championships and a bronze medal at the 2014 European Badminton Championships with Piek. In 2016, she and Piek competed at the Rio Summer Olympics and reached the quarter-finals round. She also reached a semi-final at the 2016 Indonesia Open and won the 2014 edition of the Dutch Open and both the 2013 editions of the Scottish Open and the Bitburger Open BWF Grand Prix events.

After her retirement due to a shoulder injury in 2017, she first became the National coach for the Dutch Para-Badminton team and also head-coach of the talents at the Regional Centre in Arnhem. Currently Muskens is appointed as one of the doubles coaches of Badminton Nederland at Papendal.

== Achievements ==
=== European Championships ===
Women's doubles
Year	Venue	Partner	Opponent	Score	Result
2014	Gymnastics Center; Kazan, Russia	(Netherlands) Selena Piek	(Denmark) Line Damkjær Kruse (Denmark) Marie Røpke	23–25, 11–21	Bronze
2016	Vendéspace; La Roche-sur-Yon, France	(Netherlands) Selena Piek	(Denmark) Christinna Pedersen (Denmark) Kamilla Rytter Juhl	18–21, 17–21	Silver

=== BWF Grand Prix ===
The BWF Grand Prix had two levels, the Grand Prix and Grand Prix Gold. It was a series of badminton tournaments sanctioned by the Badminton World Federation (BWF) and played between 2007 and 2017.

Women's doubles
Year	Tournament	Partner	Opponent	Score	Result
2012	Dutch Open	(Netherlands) Samantha Barning	(Netherlands) Selena Piek (Netherlands) Iris Tabeling	21–19, 16–21, 20–22	(silver) Runner-up
2013	Canada Open	(Netherlands) Selena Piek	(China) Yu Xiaohan (China) Huang Yaqiong	21–13, 11–21, 13–21	(silver) Runner-up
2013	Bitburger Open	(Netherlands) Selena Piek	(Malaysia) Ng Hui Ern (Malaysia) Ng Hui Lin	22–20, 21–15	(gold) Winner
2013	Scottish Open	(Netherlands) Selena Piek	(Malaysia) Ng Hui Ern (Malaysia) Ng Hui Lin	25–23, 15–21, 21–16	(gold) Winner
2014	Dutch Open	(Netherlands) Selena Piek	(Indonesia) Shendy Puspa Irawati (Indonesia) Vita Marissa	11–8, 4–11, 11–9, 11–10	(gold) Winner
2015	Canada Open	(Netherlands) Selena Piek	(India) Jwala Gutta (India) Ashwini Ponnappa	19–21, 16–21	(silver) Runner-up
2015	Dutch Open	(Netherlands) Selena Piek	(Bulgaria) Gabriela Stoeva (Bulgaria) Stefani Stoeva	22–24, 15–21	(silver) Runner-up
2015	Brasil Open	(Netherlands) Selena Piek	(China) Chen Qingchen (China) Jia Yifan	17–21, 14–21	(silver) Runner-up
2016	Syed Modi International	(Netherlands) Selena Piek	(South Korea) Jung Kyung-eun (South Korea) Shin Seung-chan	15–21, 13–21	(silver) Runner-up

BWF Grand Prix Gold tournament
BWF Grand Prix tournament

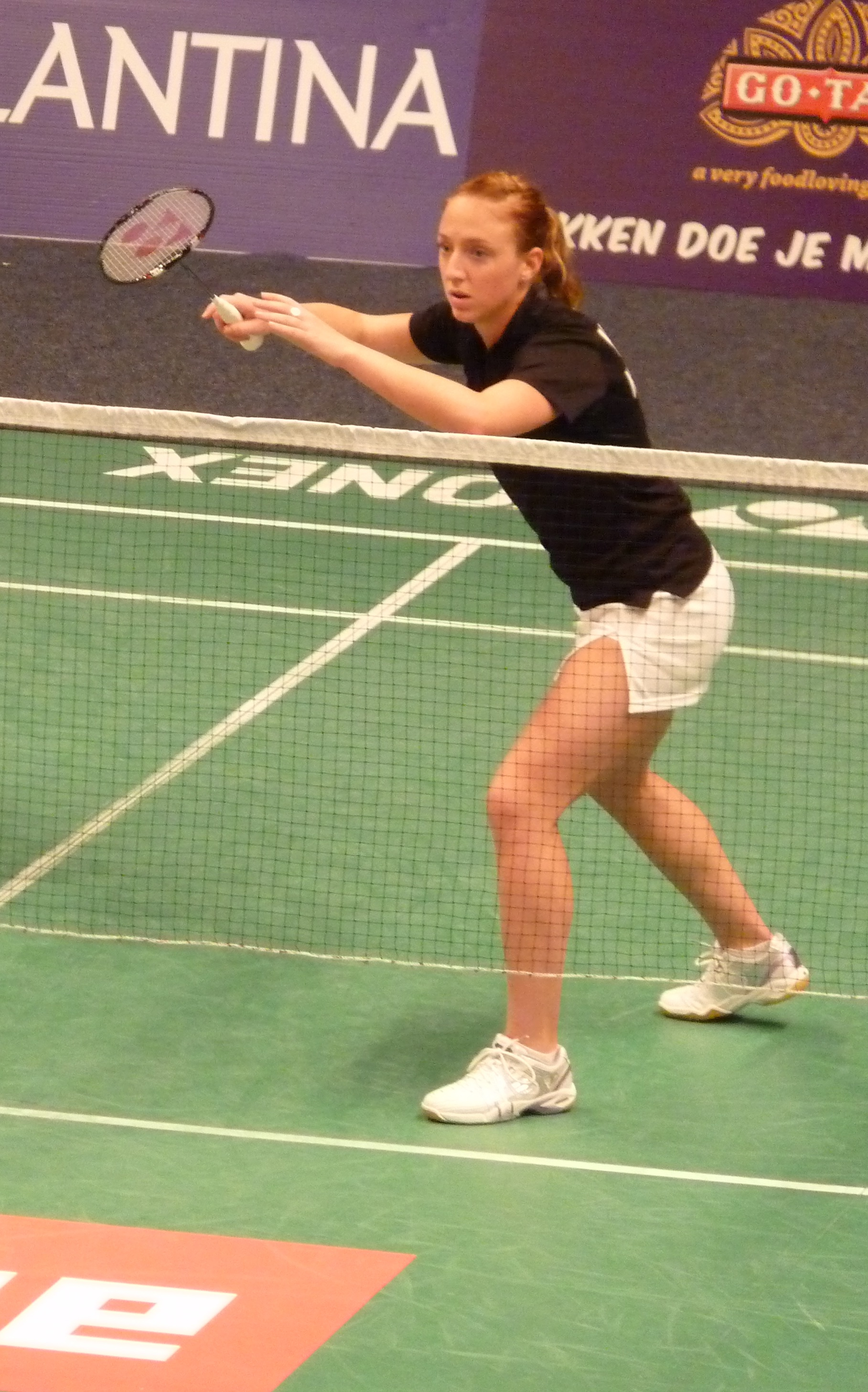
Eefje Muskens

=== BWF International Challenge/Series ===
Women's doubles
Year	Tournament	Partner	Opponent	Score	Result
2009	Norwegian International	(Netherlands) Samantha Barning	(Denmark) Helle Nielsen (Denmark) Marie Røpke	13–21, 18–21	(silver) Runner-up
2010	Dutch International	(Netherlands) Samantha Barning	(Denmark) Maria Helsbøl (Denmark) Anne Skelbæk	21–8, 21–18	(gold) Winner
2012	Croatian International	(Netherlands) Samantha Barning	(Germany) Johanna Goliszewski (Germany) Carla Nelte	21–18, 21–19	(gold) Winner
2012	Norwegian International	(Netherlands) Samantha Barning	(Netherlands) Selena Piek (Netherlands) Iris Tabeling	22–20, 21–16	(gold) Winner
2012	Irish International	(Netherlands) Samantha Barning	(France) Audrey Fontaine (France) Émilie Lefel	21–12, 21–8	(gold) Winner
2013	Irish Open	(Netherlands) Selena Piek	(Malaysia) Ng Hui Ern (Malaysia) Ng Hui Lin	21–17, 21–10	(gold) Winner
2013	Italian International	(Netherlands) Selena Piek	(Australia) He Tian Tang (Australia) Renuga Veeran	21–10, 21–8	(gold) Winner
2014	Swedish Masters	(Netherlands) Selena Piek	(Denmark) Line Damkjær Kruse (Denmark) Marie Røpke	21–19, 21–11	(gold) Winner
2014	Belgian International	(Netherlands) Selena Piek	(Netherlands) Samantha Barning (Netherlands) Iris Tabeling	11–9, 9–11, 8–11, 11–7, 11–9	(gold) Winner

BWF International Challenge tournament
BWF International Series tournament
