= Wang Sijie =

Chinese badminton player (born 1989)

Wang Sijie 王斯杰
Personal information
- Born: 31 December 1989 (age 36) Zhejiang, China

Sport
- Country: China
- Sport: Badminton

Men's & mixed doubles
- Highest ranking: 68 (MD 21 April 2016); 148 (XD 15 June 2017)
- BWF profile

Wang Sijie (Chinese: 王斯杰; born 31 December 1989) is a Chinese badminton player.

== Achievements ==
=== BWF Grand Prix ===
The BWF Grand Prix had two levels, the Grand Prix and Grand Prix Gold. It was a series of badminton tournaments sanctioned by the Badminton World Federation (BWF) and played between 2007 and 2017.

Men's doubles
Year	Tournament	Partner	Opponent	Score	Result
2015	Canada Open	(China) Huang Kaixiang	(China) Li Junhui (China) Liu Yuchen	8–21, 16–21	(silver) Runner-up
2015	Vietnam Open	(China) Huang Kaixiang	(China) Li Junhui (China) Liu Yuchen	21–17, 12–21, 18–21	(silver) Runner-up

BWF Grand Prix Gold tournament
BWF Grand Prix tournament

=== BWF International Challenge/Series ===
Men's doubles
Year	Tournament	Partner	Opponent	Score	Result
2016	China International	(China) Zhu Junhao	(China) Wang Yilyu (China) Zhang Wen	9–21, 15–21	(silver) Runner-up
2017	Osaka International	(China) Zhuge Lukai	(Japan) Kazuya Itani (Japan) Tomoya Takashina	21–10, 21–19	(gold) Winner

Mixed doubles
Year	Tournament	Partner	Opponent	Score	Result
2016	China International	(China) Chen Lu	(China) Zhou Haodong (China) Jia Yifan	21–18, 18–21, 21–17	(gold) Winner
2017	Osaka International	(China) Ni Bowen	(South Korea) Park Kyung-hoon (South Korea) Kong Hee-yong	18–21, 21–16, 21–12	(gold) Winner
2017	Smiling Fish International	(China) Du Peng	(Indonesia) Lukhi Apri Nugroho (Indonesia) Ririn Amelia	21–14, 21–12	(gold) Winner

BWF International Challenge tournament
BWF International Series tournament
