= Agnieszka Wojtkowska =

Polish badminton player (born 1987)

Personal information
- Born: 30 January 1987 (age 39) Poznań, Poland
- Height: 1.68 m (5 ft 6 in)
- Weight: 62 kg (137 lb)

Sport
- Country: Poland
- Sport: Badminton
- Handedness: Right
- Coached by: Bożena Haracz

Women's singles & doubles
- Highest ranking: 210 (WS 21 January 2010); 42 (WD 21 January 2010); 26 (XD 4 December 2014)
- BWF profile
Medal record
Women's badminton
Representing Poland
European Mixed Team Championships
Bronze medal – third place	2008 Herning	Mixed team

Agnieszka Wojtkowska (born 30 January 1987) is a Polish badminton player.

== Achievements ==
=== BWF International Challenge/Series (5 titles, 15 runners-up) ===
Women's doubles
Year	Tournament	Partner	Opponent	Score	Result
2011	Hungarian International	(Poland) Kamila Augustyn	(Poland) Natalia Pocztowiak (Croatia) Staša Poznanović	20–22, 22–20, 18–21	(silver) Runner-up
2012	Polish International	(Poland) Kamila Augustyn	(Wales) Sarah Thomas (Wales) Carissa Turner	21–15, 21–14	(gold) Winner

Mixed doubles
Year	Tournament	Partner	Opponent	Score	Result
2009	Hungarian International	(Poland) Wojciech Szkudlarczyk	(Germany) Peter Käsbauer (Germany) Johanna Goliszewski	21–15, 8–21, 21–10	(gold) Winner
2010	Bahrain International	(Poland) Wojciech Szkudlarczyk	(Indonesia) Indra Viki Okvana (Indonesia) Gustiani Megawati	21–17, 16–21, 14–21	(silver) Runner-up
2011	Slovenia International	(Poland) Wojciech Szkudlarczyk	(Croatia) Zvonimir Đurkinjak (Croatia) Staša Poznanović	15–21, 11–21	(silver) Runner-up
2011	Lithuanian International	(Poland) Wojciech Szkudlarczyk	(Republic of Ireland) Sam Magee (Republic of Ireland) Chloe Magee	9–21, 21–15, 19–21	(silver) Runner-up
2011	Slovak Open	(Poland) Wojciech Szkudlarczyk	(Netherlands) Dave Khodabux (Netherlands) Selena Piek	13–21, 18–21	(silver) Runner-up
2011	Scottish International	(Poland) Wojciech Szkudlarczyk	(Denmark) Kim Astrup (Denmark) Line Kjærsfeldt	21–15, 15–21, 13–21	(silver) Runner-up
2012	White Nights	(Poland) Wojciech Szkudlarczyk	(France) Baptiste Carême (France) Audrey Fontaine	17–21, 10–21	(silver) Runner-up
2012	Polish International	(Poland) Wojciech Szkudlarczyk	(England) Andrew Ellis (England) Jenny Wallwork	13–21, 12–21	(silver) Runner-up
2013	Polish Open	(Poland) Wojciech Szkudlarczyk	(Poland) Robert Mateusiak (Poland) Nadieżda Zięba	21–15, 16–21, 14–21	(silver) Runner-up
2013	Spanish Open	(Poland) Wojciech Szkudlarczyk	(Denmark) Anders Skaarup Rasmussen (Denmark) Lena Grebak	14–21, 18–21	(silver) Runner-up
2013	Bulgarian International	(Poland) Robert Mateusiak	(Scotland) Robert Blair (Scotland) Imogen Bankier	17–21, 15–21	(silver) Runner-up
2013	Puerto Rico International	(Poland) Robert Mateusiak	(France) Laurent Constantin (France) Laura Choinet	21–13, 21–8	(gold) Winner
2014	Austrian International	(Poland) Robert Mateusiak	(Malaysia) Chan Peng Soon (Malaysia) Lai Pei Jing	21–15, 15–21, 21–16	(gold) Winner
2014	Polish Open	(Poland) Robert Mateusiak	(Russia) Vitalij Durkin (Russia) Nina Vislova	15–21, 7–16 retired	(silver) Runner-up
2014	Spanish Open	(Poland) Robert Mateusiak	(Scotland) Robert Blair (Scotland) Imogen Bankier	13–21, 21–14, 16–21	(silver) Runner-up
2014	White Nights	(Poland) Robert Mateusiak	(Russia) Evgenij Dremin (Russia) Evgenia Dimova	17–21, 12–21	(silver) Runner-up
2014	Polish International	(Poland) Robert Mateusiak	(Ukraine) Gennadiy Natarov (Ukraine) Yuliya Kazarinova	11–9, 11–5, 11–7	(gold) Winner
2018	Hellas Open	(Poland) Paweł Pietryja	(India) Arjun M.R. (India) K. Maneesha	15–21, 14–21	(silver) Runner-up

BWF International Challenge tournament
BWF International Series tournament
BWF Future Series tournament
