= Jorrit de Ruiter =

Dutch badminton player

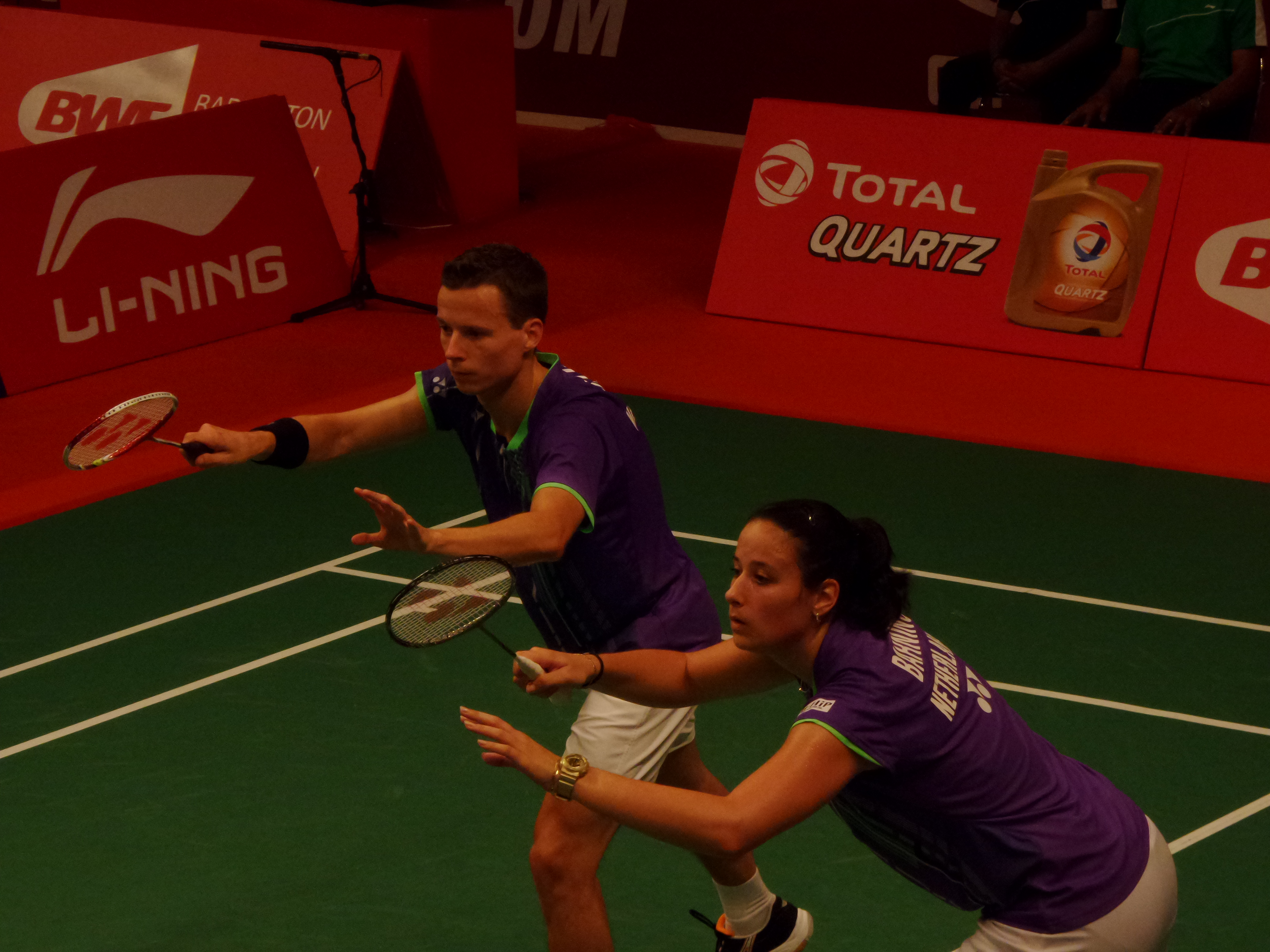
- Jorrit de Ruiter (left) at the 2015 BWF World Championships

Personal information
- Born: 28 November 1986 (age 39) Amsterdam, Netherlands

Sport
- Country: Netherlands
- Sport: Badminton
- Highest ranking: 16 (XD 18 June 2015)
- BWF profile
Medal record
Men's badminton
Representing Netherlands
European Championships
Bronze medal – third place	2014 Kazan	Mixed doubles

Jorrit de Ruiter (born 28 November 1986 in Amsterdam) is a Dutch internationally elite badminton player who, until September 2015, was member of the Dutch national team. After he had played in the 2015 World Championships in Jakarta he decided to put an end to his international career.

De Ruiter was a doubles specialist. Until April 2013 he played the men's doubles together with Dave Khodabux (highest achieved world ranking 32). From that moment on he only played the mixed doubles with Samantha Barning who was his partner in this discipline since 2012 and with whom he achieved world ranking 24 in about a year’s time. In September 2013, Barning got seriously injured, the reason why they couldn’t play a considerable number of tournaments. Therefore, they fell far back on the world ranking. In February 2014 they started to play international tournaments again and came in third place at the European Championships in Kazan, Russia. His highest achieved ranking in the mixed doubles was 16.

De Ruiter trained full-time at the Dutch National Sports Centre Papendal. He was chairman of the athletes council of the Dutch Badminton Association and he has a bachelor's degree in sports marketing at Johan Cruyff University in Amsterdam.

== Career ==
De Ruiter started to play badminton when he was seven years old at the Haarlem Badminton Club Duinwijck for which he played in different leagues until 2005. During this period he also joined the National Badminton Youth Team and 9 times he won a national youth championship (4 times mixed doubles, 3 times men's doubles and 2 times men's singles). In the season 2005/06, he played for the first time in the Premier League at the then premier league club Slotermeer in Amsterdam. One year later he joined the First team of BC Van Zijderveld in Amstelveen. In 2011, he returned to BC Duinwijck. As from the season 2012/13, de Ruiter played in the German premier league as club member of 1. BV Mülheim an der Ruhr. In 2016 he committed himself to BC Duinwijck again where he plays in the Dutch premier league. In March 2018 his team won the national championship in the premier league which is the 25th championship for the club. A year later de Ruiter is present again when his club also wins the final of the premier league season 2018-2019.

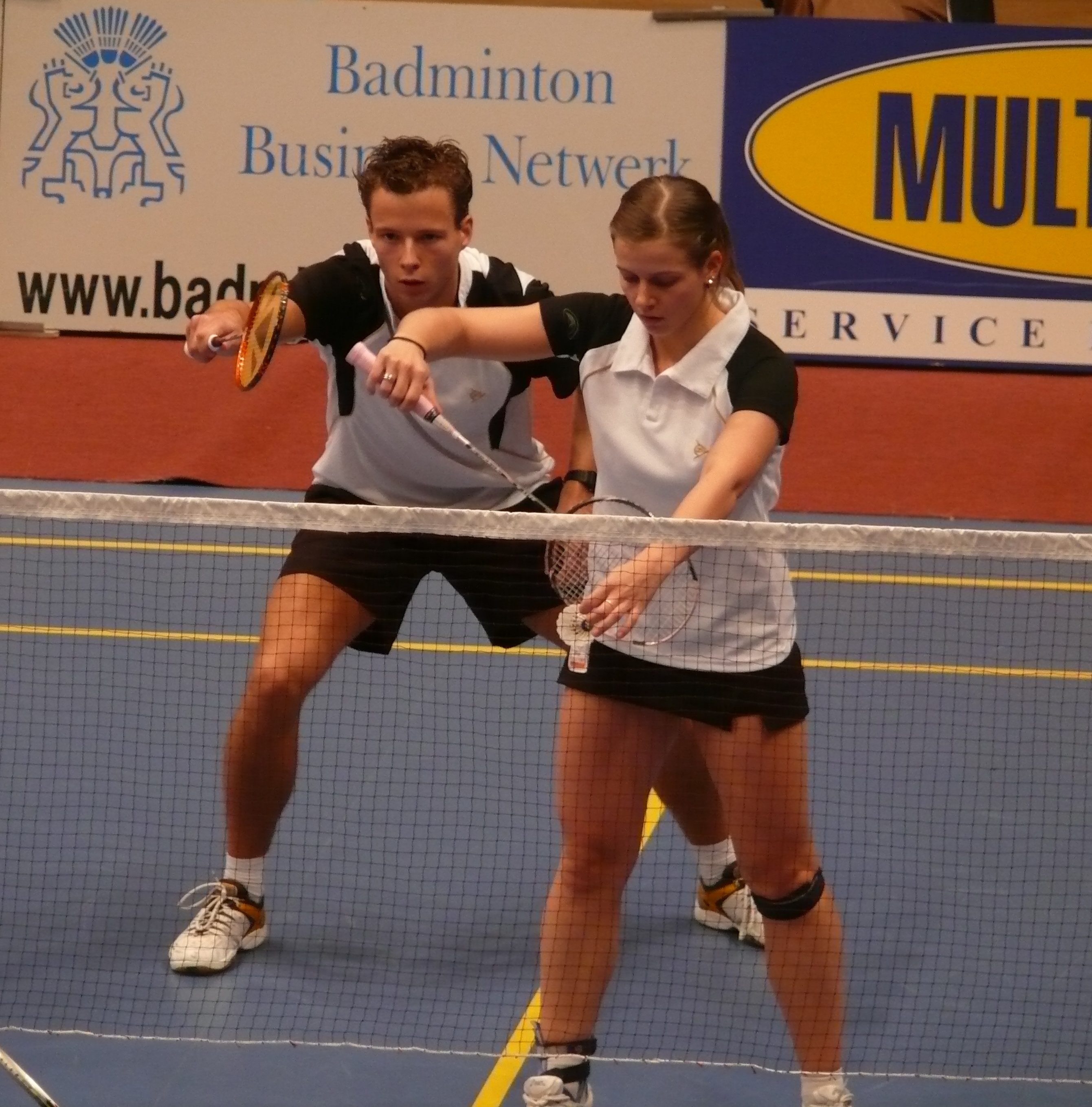
De Ruiter and Ilse Vaessen

== Achievements ==
=== European Championships ===
Mixed doubles
Year	Venue	Partner	Opponent	Score	Result
2014	Gymnastics Center; Kazan, Russia	(Netherlands) Samantha Barning	(Denmark) Joachim Fischer Nielsen (Denmark) Christinna Pedersen	12–21, 8–21	Bronze

=== BWF Grand Prix ===
The BWF Grand Prix had two levels, the Grand Prix and Grand Prix Gold. It was a series of badminton tournaments sanctioned by the Badminton World Federation (BWF) and played between 2007 and 2017.

Mixed doubles
Year	Tournament	Partner	Opponent	Score	Result
2013	Canada Open	(Netherlands) Samantha Barning	(Hong Kong) Lee Chun Hei (Hong Kong) Chau Hoi Wah	13–21, 10–21	(silver) Runner-up
2014	Canada Open	(Netherlands) Samantha Barning	(Germany) Max Schwenger (Germany) Carla Nelte	18–21, 21–23	(silver) Runner-up
2014	Dutch Open	(Netherlands) Samantha Barning	(Indonesia) Riky Widianto (Indonesia) Richi Puspita Dili	10–11, 11–10, 11–9, 8–11, 1–11	(silver) Runner-up

BWF Grand Prix Gold tournament
BWF Grand Prix tournament

=== BWF International Challenge/Series ===
Men's doubles
Year	Tournament	Partner	Opponent	Score	Result
2011	Slovak Open	(Netherlands) Dave Khodabux	(Poland) Łukasz Moreń (Poland) Wojciech Szkudlarczyk	21–10, 22–20	(gold) Winner
2012	Estonian International	(Netherlands) Dave Khodabux	(France) Laurent Constantin (France) Sébastien Vincent	17–21, 21–19, 15–21	(silver) Runner-up
2012	Swedish Masters	(Netherlands) Dave Khodabux	(Russia) Vladimir Ivanov (Russia) Ivan Sozonov	16–21, 9–21	(silver) Runner-up
2012	Dutch International	(Netherlands) Dave Khodabux	(Malaysia) Nelson Heg (Malaysia) Teo Ee Yi	21–19, 13–21, 9–21	(silver) Runner-up
2012	Spanish International	(Netherlands) Dave Khodabux	(Netherlands) Jacco Arends (Netherlands) Jelle Maas	21–16, 21–23, 21–13	(gold) Winner

Mixed doubles
Year	Tournament	Partner	Opponent	Score	Result
2007	Welsh International	(Netherlands) Ilse Vaessen	(Poland) Adam Cwalina (Poland) Malgorzata Kurdelska	16–21, 19–21	(silver) Runner-up
2008	Welsh International	(Netherlands) Ilse Vaessen	(Scotland) Watson Briggs (Scotland) Jillie Cooper	19–21, 18–21	(silver) Runner-up
2011	Belgian International	(Netherlands) Selena Piek	(Singapore) Chayut Triyachart (Singapore) Yao Lei	25–23, 16–21, 14–21	(silver) Runner-up
2012	Estonian International	(Netherlands) Samantha Barning	(Netherlands) Dave Khodabux (Netherlands) Selena Piek	7–21, 12–21	(silver) Runner-up
2012	Norwegian International	(Netherlands) Samantha Barning	(Germany) Michael Fuchs (Germany) Birgit Michels	16–21, 23–21, 21–19	(gold) Winner
2012	Irish International	(Netherlands) Samantha Barning	(Netherlands) Jacco Arends (Netherlands) Ilse Vaessen	22–20, 21–17	(gold) Winner

BWF International Challenge tournament
BWF International Series tournament
