= Samantha Barning =

Dutch badminton player

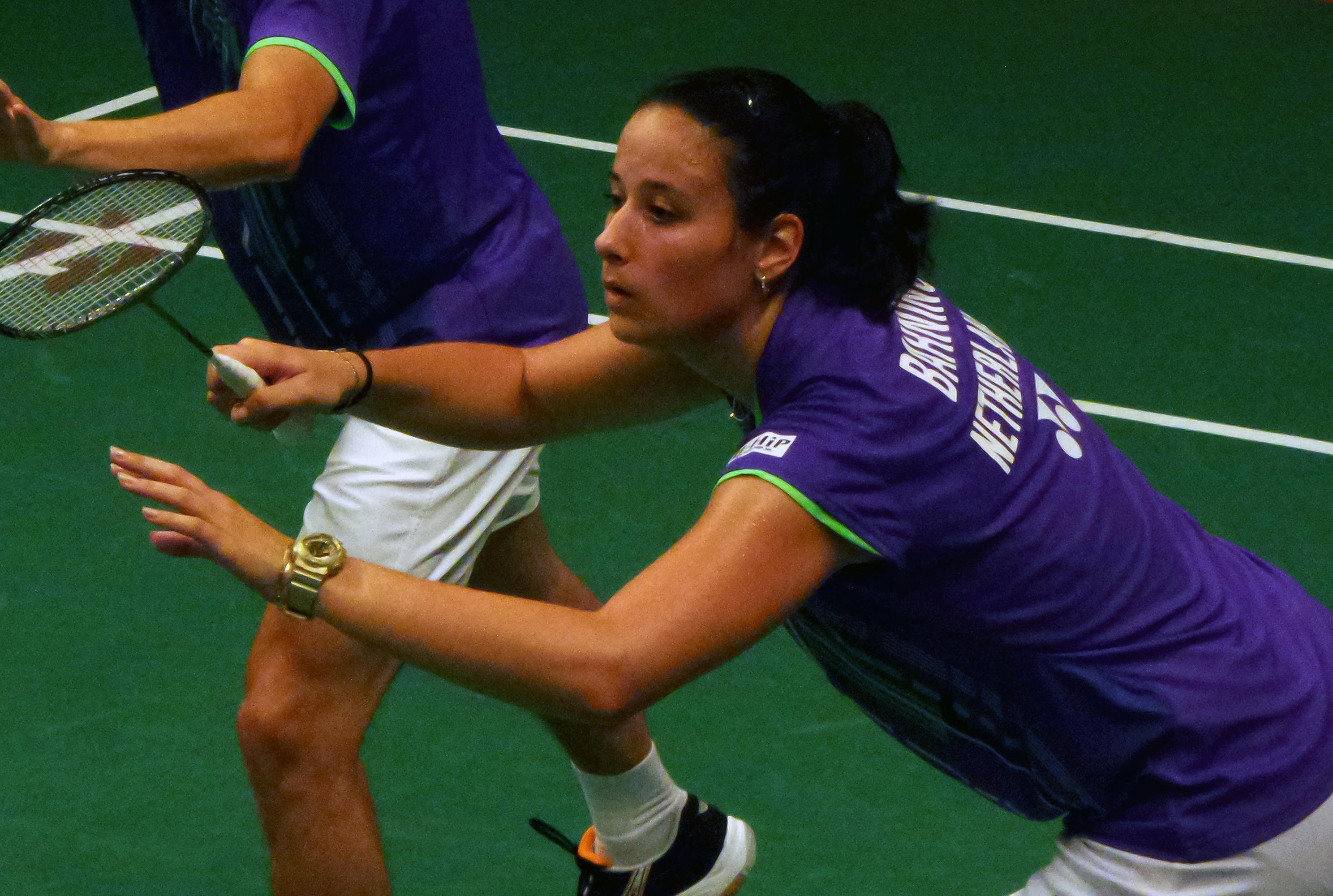
- Samantha Barning at the 2015 BWF World Championships

Personal information
- Born: June 28, 1989 (age 37) Amstelveen, Netherlands
- Height: 1.78 m (5 ft 10 in)

Sport
- Country: Netherlands
- Sport: Badminton
- Handedness: Right

Women's & mixed doubles
- Highest ranking: 24 (WD 26 August 2010); 16 (XD 18 June 2015)
- BWF profile
Medal record
Representing Netherlands
Women's badminton
European Championships
Bronze medal – third place	2014 Kazan	Mixed doubles
Bronze medal – third place	2016 La Roche-sur-Yon	Women's doubles
European Women's Team Championships
Bronze medal – third place	2012 Amsterdam	Women's team
European Junior Championships
Silver medal – second place	2007 Völklingen	Mixed team

Samantha Barning (born 28 June 1989) is a former professional Dutch badminton player. She could play either in singles or in doubles. She won bronze medals at the 2014 European Championships in the mixed doubles with Jorrit de Ruiter, and at the 2016 European Championships in the women's doubles with Iris Tabeling. Barning also featured in the Dutch women's team that won bronze at the 2012 European Women's Team Championships. She won the Dutch National Mixed doubles title in 2010 with Dave Khodabux and the Women's doubles title in 2013 with Eefje Muskens.

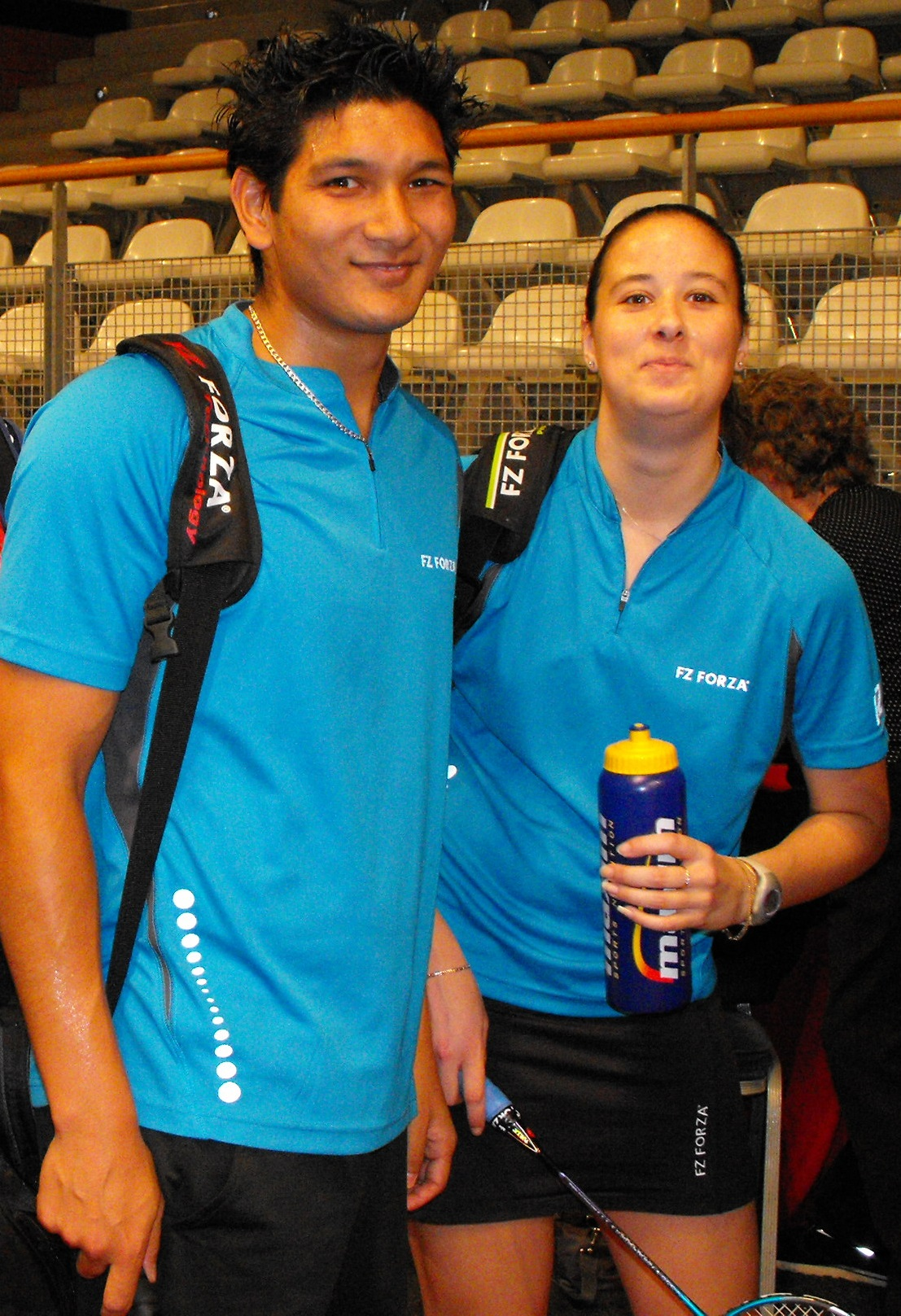
Dave Khodabux and Samantha Barning

== Achievements ==
=== European Championships ===
Women's doubles
Year	Venue	Partner	Opponent	Score	Result
2016	Vendéspace; La Roche-sur-Yon, France	(Netherlands) Iris Tabeling	(Denmark) Christinna Pedersen (Denmark) Kamilla Rytter Juhl	9–21, 13–21	Bronze

Mixed doubles
Year	Venue	Partner	Opponent	Score	Result
2014	Gymnastics Center; Kazan, Russia	(Netherlands) Jorrit de Ruiter	(Denmark) Joachim Fischer Nielsen (Denmark) Christinna Pedersen	12–21, 8–21	Bronze

=== BWF Grand Prix ===
The BWF Grand Prix had two levels, the Grand Prix and Grand Prix Gold. It was a series of badminton tournaments sanctioned by the Badminton World Federation (BWF) and played between 2007 and 2017.

Women's doubles
Year	Tournament	Partner	Opponent	Score	Result
2012	Dutch Open	(Netherlands) Eefje Muskens	(Netherlands) Selena Piek (Netherlands) Iris Tabeling	21–19, 16–21, 20–22	(silver) Runner-up
2015	Scottish Open	(Netherlands) Iris Tabeling	(Japan) Yuki Fukushima (Japan) Sayaka Hirota	14–21, 11–14 Retired	(silver) Runner-up

Mixed doubles
Year	Tournament	Partner	Opponent	Score	Result
2013	Canada Open	(Netherlands) Jorrit de Ruiter	(Hong Kong) Lee Chun Hei (Hong Kong) Chau Hoi Wah	13–21, 10–21	(silver) Runner-up
2014	Canada Open	(Netherlands) Jorrit de Ruiter	(Germany) Max Schwenger (Germany) Carla Nelte	18–21, 21–23	(silver) Runner-up
2014	Dutch Open	(Netherlands) Jorrit de Ruiter	(Indonesia) Riky Widianto (Indonesia) Richi Puspita Dili	10–11, 11–10, 11–9, 8–11, 1–11	(silver) Runner-up

BWF Grand Prix Gold tournament
BWF Grand Prix tournament

=== BWF International Challenge/Series ===
Women's doubles
Year	Tournament	Partner	Opponent	Score	Result
2009	Norwegian International	(Netherlands) Eefje Muskens	(Denmark) Helle Nielsen (Denmark) Marie Røpke	13–21, 18–21	(silver) Runner-up
2010	Dutch International	(Netherlands) Eefje Muskens	(Denmark) Maria Helsbøl (Denmark) Anne Skelbæk	21–8, 21–18	(gold) Winner
2012	Estonian International	(Netherlands) Ilse Vaessen	(Netherlands) Selena Piek (Netherlands) Iris Tabeling	15–21, 21–13, 10–21	(silver) Runner-up
2012	Croatian International	(Netherlands) Eefje Muskens	(Germany) Johanna Goliszewski (Germany) Carla Nelte	21–18, 21–19	(gold) Winner
2012	Norwegian International	(Netherlands) Eefje Muskens	(Netherlands) Selena Piek (Netherlands) Iris Tabeling	22–20, 21–16	(gold) Winner
2012	Irish International	(Netherlands) Eefje Muskens	(France) Audrey Fontaine (France) Émilie Lefel	21–12, 21–8	(gold) Winner
2014	Dutch International	(Netherlands) Iris Tabeling	(Denmark) Maiken Fruergaard (Denmark) Sara Thygesen	21–16, 21–12	(gold) Winner
2014	Belgian International	(Netherlands) Iris Tabeling	(Netherlands) Eefje Muskens (Netherlands) Selena Piek	9–11, 11–9, 8–11, 11–10, 7–11	(silver) Runner-up
2014	Italian International	(Netherlands) Iris Tabeling	(Russia) Victoria Dergunova (Russia) Olga Morozova	21–17, 21–15	(gold) Winner
2015	Swiss International	(Netherlands) Iris Tabeling	(Indonesia) Pia Zebadiah Bernadet (Indonesia) Aprilsasi Putri Lejarsar Variella	21–11, 21–10	(gold) Winner
2016	Swedish Masters	(Netherlands) Iris Tabeling	(Denmark) Maiken Fruergaard (Denmark) Sara Thygesen	19–21, 17–21	(silver) Runner-up
2016	Finnish Open	(Netherlands) Iris Tabeling	(Japan) Misato Aratama (Japan) Akane Watanabe	12–21, 17–21	(silver) Runner-up

Mixed doubles
Year	Tournament	Partner	Opponent	Score	Result
2011	Swedish Masters	(Netherlands) Dave Khodabux	(England) Robin Middleton (England) Heather Olver	21–15, 9–21, 14–21	(silver) Runner-up
2012	Estonian International	(Netherlands) Jorrit de Ruiter	(Netherlands) Dave Khodabux (Netherlands) Selena Piek	7–21, 12–21	(silver) Runner-up
2012	Norwegian International	(Netherlands) Jorrit de Ruiter	(Germany) Michael Fuchs (Germany) Birgit Michels	16–21, 23–21, 21–19	(gold) Winner
2012	Irish International	(Netherlands) Jorrit de Ruiter	(Netherlands) Jacco Arends (Netherlands) Ilse Vaessen	22–20, 21–17	(gold) Winner
2016	Orléans International	(Netherlands) Robin Tabeling	(Denmark) Mathias Christiansen (Denmark) Lena Grebak	14–21, 13–21	(silver) Runner-up

BWF International Challenge tournament
BWF International Series tournament
