= 2011 European Mixed Team Badminton Championships =

Tournament details
- Dates: 15-20 February 2011
- Venue: Sporthallen Zuid
- Location: Amsterdam, Netherlands

The 2011 European Mixed Team Badminton Championships were held at the Sporthallen Zuid in Amsterdam, Netherlands, from February 15–20, and were organised by the Badminton Europe and the Nederlandse Badminton Bond. It was the 21st edition of the tournament. Denmark was the defending champion. The draw was made on 17 December 2010.

Denmark defeated Germany in the final 3–1 to defend their title.

== Medalists ==
Event	Gold	Silver	Bronze
Mixed Team	Denmark	Germany	England Russia

== Group stage ==
=== Group 1 ===
Pos	Team	Pld	W	L	MF	MA	MD	GF	GA	GD	PF	PA	PD	Pts	Qualification
1	Denmark	3	3	0	14	1	+13	29	2	+27	646	334	+312	3	Knockout stage
2	Czech Republic	3	2	1	10	5	+5	21	14	+7	626	603	+23	2	
3	Israel	3	1	2	3	12	−9	8	25	−17	467	641	−174	1	
4	Italy	3	0	3	3	12	−9	9	26	−17	516	677	−161	0	

Source: BWF

==== Denmark vs Israel ====
Denmark
5
Sporthallen Zuid, Court 2
15 February 2011, 14:00

Israel
0

			1	2	3
1	(Denmark) (Israel)	Hans-Kristian Vittinghus; Misha Zilberman	21; 14	21; 14
2	(Denmark) (Israel)	Karina Jørgensen; Alina Pugach	21; 4	21; 6
3	(Denmark) (Israel)	Rasmus Bonde / Anders Kristiansen; Alexander Bass / Vladislav Chislov	21; 12	21; 15
4	(Denmark) (Israel)	Kamilla Rytter Juhl / Christinna Pedersen; Dana Katz / Rotem Romano	21; 4	21; 6
5	(Denmark) (Israel)	Rasmus Bonde / Marie Røpke; Vladislav Chislov / Alina Pugach	21; 8	21; 14

==== Italy vs Czech Republic ====
Italy
1
Sporthallen Zuid, Court 6
15 February 2011, 14:00

Czech Republic
4

			1	2	3
1	(Italy) (Czech Republic)	Giovanni Traina / Agnese Allegrini; Jakub Bitman / Alžběta Bášová	11; 21	21; 17	21; 17
2	(Italy) (Czech Republic)	Rosario Maddaloni; Tomáš Kopřiva	17; 21	18; 21
3	(Italy) (Czech Republic)	Agnese Allegrini; Kristína Ludíková	16; 21	21; 14	20; 22
4	(Italy) (Czech Republic)	Rosario Maddaloni / Giovanni Traina; Jakub Bitman / Pavel Drančák	21; 18	13; 21	16; 21
5	(Italy) (Czech Republic)	Isabel Delueg / Ira Tomio; Alžběta Bášová / Kristína Ludíková	12; 21	11; 21

==== Denmark vs Italy ====
Denmark
5
Sporthallen Zuid, Court 2
16 February 2011, 19:00

Italy
0

			1	2	3
1	(Denmark) (Italy)	Anders Kristiansen / Christinna Pedersen; Rosario Maddaloni / Isabel Delueg	21; 9	21; 9
2	(Denmark) (Italy)	Hans-Kristian Vittinghus; Giovanni Traina	21; 4	21; 8
3	(Denmark) (Italy)	Karina Jørgensen; Agnese Allegrini	21; 12	21; 19
4	(Denmark) (Italy)	Rasmus Bonde / Anders Kristiansen; Giovanni Greco / Giovanni Traina	21; 10	21; 14
5	(Denmark) (Italy)	Kamilla Rytter Juhl / Marie Røpke; Isabel Delueg / Ira Tomio	21; 9	21; 3

==== Israel vs Czech Republic ====
Israel
0
Sporthallen Zuid, Court 5
16 February 2011, 19:00

Czech Republic
5

			1	2	3
1	(Israel) (Czech Republic)	Misha Zilberman; Tomáš Kopřiva	19; 21	18; 21
2	(Israel) (Czech Republic)	Alina Pugach; Kristína Ludíková	9; 21	19; 21
3	(Israel) (Czech Republic)	Alexander Bass / Vladislav Chislov; Jakub Bitman / Pavel Drančák	16; 21	12; 21
4	(Israel) (Czech Republic)	Dana Katz / Rotem Romano; Alžběta Bášová / Lucie Havlová	12; 21	11; 21
5	(Israel) (Czech Republic)	Misha Zilberman / Alina Pugach; Jakub Bitman / Alžběta Bášová	22; 20	15; 21	19; 21

==== Denmark vs Czech Republic ====
Denmark
4
Sporthallen Zuid, Court 1
17 February 2011, 14:00

Czech Republic
1

			1	2	3
1	(Denmark) (Czech Republic)	Anders Kristiansen / Christinna Pedersen; Jakub Bitman / Alžběta Bášová	21; 8	21; 10
2	(Denmark) (Czech Republic)	Hans-Kristian Vittinghus; Tomáš Kopřiva	21; 14	21; 9
3	(Denmark) (Czech Republic)	Karina Jørgensen; Kristína Ludíková	17; 21	22; 20	19; 21
4	(Denmark) (Czech Republic)	Rasmus Bonde / Anders Kristiansen; Jakub Bitman / Pavel Drančák	21; 10	21; 7
5	(Denmark) (Czech Republic)	Kamilla Rytter Juhl / Marie Røpke; Alžběta Bášová / Lucie Havlová	21; 11	21; 9

==== Israel vs Italy ====
Israel
3
Sporthallen Zuid, Court 6
17 February 2011, 14:00

Italy
2

			1	2	3
1	(Israel) (Italy)	Misha Zilberman; Giovanni Greco	21; 11	21; 7
2	(Israel) (Italy)	Rotem Romano; Agnese Allegrini	7; 21	2; 21
3	(Israel) (Italy)	Alexander Bass / Vladislav Chislov; Rosario Maddaloni / Giovanni Traina	21; 18	18; 21	19; 21
4	(Israel) (Italy)	Dana Katz / Alina Pugach; Isabel Delueg / Ira Tomio	21; 12	18; 21	21; 19
5	(Israel) (Italy)	Misha Zilberman / Svetlana Zilberman; Giovanni Traina / Agnese Allegrini	21; 17	21; 12

=== Group 2 ===
Pos	Team	Pld	W	L	MF	MA	MD	GF	GA	GD	PF	PA	PD	Pts	Qualification
1	Germany	3	3	0	15	0	+15	30	3	+27	679	384	+295	3	Knockout stage
2	Estonia	3	2	1	9	6	+3	20	16	+4	640	617	+23	2	
3	Belgium	3	1	2	6	9	−3	16	19	−3	598	635	−37	1	
4	Latvia	3	0	3	0	15	−15	2	30	−28	384	665	−281	0	

Source: BWF

==== Estonia vs Belgium ====
Estonia
4
Sporthallen Zuid, Court 4
15 February 2011, 19:00

Belgium
1

			1	2	3
1	(Estonia) (Belgium)	Laura Vana; Lianne Tan	7; 21	21; 23
2	(Estonia) (Belgium)	Raul Must; Yuhan Tan	20; 22	21; 16	21; 14
3	(Estonia) (Belgium)	Karoliine Hõim / Laura Vana; Steffi Annys / Séverine Corvilain	21; 19	18; 21	21; 15
4	(Estonia) (Belgium)	Rainer Kaljumäe / Raul Käsner; Matijs Dierickx / Freek Golinski	21; 17	21; 17
5	(Estonia) (Belgium)	Ants Mängel / Karoliine Hõim; Jonathan Gillis / Janne Elst	20; 22	21; 17	21; 8

==== Germany vs Latvia ====
Germany
5
Sporthallen Zuid, Court 5
15 February 2011, 19:00

Latvia
0

			1	2	3
1	(Germany) (Latvia)	Karin Schnaase; Ieva Pope	21; 9	21; 10
2	(Germany) (Latvia)	Marcel Reuter; Edijs Līviņš	21; 7	21; 6
3	(Germany) (Latvia)	Birgit Michels / Sandra Marinello; Aija Pope / Kristīne Šefere	21; 8	21; 7
4	(Germany) (Latvia)	Michael Fuchs / Oliver Roth; Guntis Lavrinovičs / Edijs Līviņš	21; 8	21; 12
5	(Germany) (Latvia)	Johannes Schöttler / Sandra Marinello; Raimonds Cipe / Kristīne Šefere	21; 11	21; 9

==== Germany vs Estonia ====
Germany
5
Sporthallen Zuid, Court 1
16 February 2011, 14:00

Estonia
0

			1	2	3
1	(Germany) (Estonia)	Marc Zwiebler; Raul Must	20; 22	21; 16	21; 10
2	(Germany) (Estonia)	Karin Schnaase; Karoliine Hõim	21; 11	14; 21	21; 14
3	(Germany) (Estonia)	Ingo Kindervater / Johannes Schöttler; Rainer Kaljumäe / Raul Käsner	21; 9	21; 11
4	(Germany) (Estonia)	Carla Nelte / Birgit Michels; Karoliine Hõim / Laura Vana	21; 14	21; 9
5	(Germany) (Estonia)	Johannes Schöttler / Sandra Marinello; Ants Mängel / Kertu Margus	21; 6	21; 11

==== Latvia vs Belgium ====
Latvia
0
Sporthallen Zuid, Court 2
16 February 2011, 14:00

Belgium
5

			1	2	3
1	(Latvia) (Belgium)	Guntis Lavrinovičs / Kristīne Šefere; Freek Golinski / Steffi Annys	10; 21	14; 21
2	(Latvia) (Belgium)	Raimonds Cipe; Maxime Moreels	21; 13	15; 21	15; 21
3	(Latvia) (Belgium)	Ieva Pope; Lianne Tan	15; 21	9; 21
4	(Latvia) (Belgium)	Guntis Lavrinovičs / Edijs Līviņš; Matijs Dierickx / Jonathan Gillis	12; 21	17; 21
5	(Latvia) (Belgium)	Aija Pope / Kristīne Šefere; Janne Elst / Jelske Snoeck	16; 21	12; 21

==== Germany vs Belgium ====
Germany
5
Sporthallen Zuid, Court 3
17 February 2011, 10:00

Belgium
0

			1	2	3
1	(Germany) (Belgium)	Juliane Schenk; Lianne Tan	21; 11	21; 12
2	(Germany) (Belgium)	Marcel Reuter; Yuhan Tan	15; 21	21; 13	21; 16
3	(Germany) (Belgium)	Birgit Michels / Sandra Marinello; Steffi Annys / Séverine Corvilain	21; 16	21; 15
4	(Germany) (Belgium)	Ingo Kindervater / Johannes Schöttler; Matijs Dierickx / Freek Golinski	21; 8	21; 9
5	(Germany) (Belgium)	Michael Fuchs / Birgit Michels; Jonathan Gillis / Jelske Snoeck	21; 11	21; 11

==== Latvia vs Estonia ====
Latvia
0
Sporthallen Zuid, Court 6
17 February 2011, 10:00

Estonia
5

			1	2	3
1	(Latvia) (Estonia)	Raimonds Cipe; Rainer Kaljumäe	9; 21	1; 21
2	(Latvia) (Estonia)	Kristīne Šefere; Karoliine Hõim	16; 21	10; 21
3	(Latvia) (Estonia)	Guntis Lavrinovičs / Edijs Līviņš; Rainer Kaljumäe / Raul Käsner	10; 21	14; 21
4	(Latvia) (Estonia)	Aija Pope / Ieva Pope; Karoliine Hõim / Laura Vana	21; 18	9; 21	14; 21
5	(Latvia) (Estonia)	Raimonds Cipe / Kristīne Šefere; Raul Käsner / Kertu Margus	14; 21	23; 25

=== Group 3 ===
Pos	Team	Pld	W	L	MF	MA	MD	GF	GA	GD	PF	PA	PD	Pts	Qualification
1	England	3	3	0	13	2	+11	28	6	+22	694	477	+217	3	Knockout stage
2	Ireland	3	2	1	8	7	+1	18	16	+2	603	619	−16	2	
3	Austria	3	1	2	7	8	−1	16	17	−1	593	587	+6	1	
4	Slovenia	3	0	3	2	13	−11	5	28	−23	470	677	−207	0	

Source: BWF

==== England vs Slovenia ====
England
4
Sporthallen Zuid, Court 3
15 February 2011, 14:00

Slovenia
1

			1	2	3
1	(England) (Slovenia)	Rajiv Ouseph; Iztok Utroša	7; 12	21; 15
2	(England) (Slovenia)	Kate Robertshaw; Špela Silvester	21; 9	18; 21	20; 22
3	(England) (Slovenia)	Chris Adcock / Andrew Ellis; Urban Turk / Iztok Utroša	21; 12	21; 16
4	(England) (Slovenia)	Mariana Agathangelou / Heather Olver; Tina Kodrič / Maja Tvrdy	21; 10	21; 6
5	(England) (Slovenia)	Nathan Robertson / Jenny Wallwork; Urban Turk / Špela Silvester	21; 4	21; 8

==== Austria vs Ireland ====
Austria
2
Sporthallen Zuid, Court 4
15 February 2011, 14:00

Ireland
3

			1	2	3
1	(Austria) (Republic of Ireland)	Roman Zirnwald / Elisabeth Baldauf; Sam Magee / Chloe Magee	11; 21	14; 21
2	(Austria) (Republic of Ireland)	Michael Lahnsteiner; Scott Evans	15; 21	14; 21
3	(Austria) (Republic of Ireland)	Simone Prutsch; Chloe Magee	19; 21	20; 22
4	(Austria) (Republic of Ireland)	Jürgen Koch / Roman Zirnwald; Sam Magee / Tony Stephenson	21; 18	21; 15
5	(Austria) (Republic of Ireland)	Elisabeth Baldauf / Simone Prutsch; Sinead Chambers / Jennie King	20; 22	21; 12	21; 13

==== England vs Austria ====
England
5
Sporthallen Zuid, Court 3
16 February 2011, 10:00

Austria
0

			1	2	3
1	(England) (Austria)	Sarah Walker; Simone Prutsch	21; 13	23; 21
2	(England) (Austria)	Carl Baxter; Michael Lahnsteiner	17; 21	21; 13	21; 9
3	(England) (Austria)	Jenny Wallwork / Gabby White; Elisabeth Baldauf / Simone Prutsch	21; 13	21; 10
4	(England) (Austria)	Anthony Clark / Chris Langridge; Jürgen Koch / Peter Zauner	21; 19	19; 21	21; 14
5	(England) (Austria)	Chris Adcock / Gabby White; Roman Zirnwald / Elisabeth Baldauf	21; 18	21; 14

==== Slovenia vs Ireland ====
Slovenia
0
Sporthallen Zuid, Court 6
16 February 2011, 10:00

Ireland
5

			1	2	3
1	(Slovenia) (Republic of Ireland)	Urban Turk / Špela Silvester; Sam Magee / Chloe Magee	15; 21	14; 21
2	(Slovenia) (Republic of Ireland)	Iztok Utroša; Scott Evans	14; 21	21; 19	14; 21
3	(Slovenia) (Republic of Ireland)	Maja Tvrdy; Chloe Magee	19; 21	8; 21
4	(Slovenia) (Republic of Ireland)	Urban Turk / Iztok Utroša; Sam Magee / Tony Stephenson	21; 23	18; 21
5	(Slovenia) (Republic of Ireland)	Tina Kodrič / Špela Silvester; Sinead Chambers / Jennie King	21; 18	17; 21	21; 12

==== Slovenia vs Austria ====
Slovenia
0
Sporthallen Zuid, Court 1
17 February 2011, 19:00

Austria
5

			1	2	3
1	(Slovenia) (Austria)	Špela Silvester; Simone Prutsch	16; 21	10; 21
2	(Slovenia) (Austria)	Iztok Utroša; Michael Lahnsteiner	15; 21	16; 21
3	(Slovenia) (Austria)	Tina Kodrič / Špela Silvester; Elisabeth Baldauf / Simone Prutsch	16; 21	10; 21
4	(Slovenia) (Austria)	Denis Peshehonov / Urban Turk; Jürgen Koch / Peter Zauner	9; 21	12; 21
5	(Slovenia) (Austria)	Iztok Utroša / Tina Kodrič; Roman Zirnwald / Elisabeth Baldauf	13; 21	15; 21

==== England vs Ireland ====
England
4
Sporthallen Zuid, Court 4
17 February 2011, 19:00

Ireland
1

			1	2	3
1	(England) (Republic of Ireland)	Rajiv Ouseph; Scott Evans	21; 13	21; 13
2	(England) (Republic of Ireland)	Sarah Walker; Chloe Magee	18; 21	21; 6	12; 21
3	(England) (Republic of Ireland)	Chris Adcock / Andrew Ellis; Sam Magee / Tony Stephenson	21; 15	21; 8
4	(England) (Republic of Ireland)	Mariana Agathangelou / Heather Olver; Sinead Chambers / Jennie King	21; 14	21; 15
5	(England) (Republic of Ireland)	Nathan Robertson / Jenny Wallwork; Sam Magee / Chloe Magee	21; 17	21; 13

=== Group 4 ===
Pos	Team	Pld	W	L	MF	MA	MD	GF	GA	GD	PF	PA	PD	Pts	Qualification
1	Russia	3	3	0	14	1	+13	28	3	+25	645	357	+288	3	Knockout stage
2	Sweden	3	2	1	10	5	+5	20	11	+9	573	492	+81	2	
3	Wales	3	1	2	5	10	−5	12	20	−8	518	601	−83	1	
4	Cyprus	3	0	3	1	14	−13	2	28	−26	341	627	−286	0	

Source: BWF

==== Russia vs Wales ====
Russia
5
Sporthallen Zuid, Court 1
15 February 2011, 14:00

Wales
0

			1	2	3
1	(Russia) (Wales)	Evgenij Dremin / Anastasia Prokopenko; Martyn Lewis / Bethan Higginson	21; 17	21; 4
2	(Russia) (Wales)	Stanislav Pukhov; Daniel Font	21; 10	21; 12
3	(Russia) (Wales)	Ella Diehl; Sarah Thomas	21; 5	21; 12
4	(Russia) (Wales)	Vitalij Durkin / Aleksandr Nikolaenko; Martyn Lewis / Joe Morgan	21; 14	23; 25	21; 10
5	(Russia) (Wales)	Anastasia Prokopenko / Valeria Sorokina; Caroline Harvey / Carissa Turner	21; 19	21; 7

==== Cyprus vs Sweden ====
Cyprus
0
Sporthallen Zuid, Court 5
15 February 2011, 14:00

Sweden
5

			1	2	3
1	(Cyprus) (Sweden)	Nikolas Panayiotou / Dometia Ioannou; Jonatan Nordh / Amanda Högström	7; 21	11; 21
2	(Cyprus) (Sweden)	Demetris Kyprianou; Gabriel Ulldahl	6; 21	17; 21
3	(Cyprus) (Sweden)	Stella Knekna; Jenny Wan	13; 21	6; 21
4	(Cyprus) (Sweden)	Demetris Kyprianou / Nikolas Panayiotou; Oscar Kruse / Jonatan Nordh	14; 21	16; 21
5	(Cyprus) (Sweden)	Dometia Ioannou / Stella Knekna; Emelie Lennartsson / Emma Wengberg	11; 21	13; 21

==== Russia vs Cyprus ====
Russia
5
Sporthallen Zuid, Court 2
16 February 2011, 10:00

Cyprus
0

			1	2	3
1	(Russia) (Cyprus)	Vitalij Durkin / Nina Vislova; Nikolas Panayiotou / Dometia Ioannou	21; 5	21; 3
2	(Russia) (Cyprus)	Stanislav Pukhov; Demetris Kyprianou	21; 11	21; 6
3	(Russia) (Cyprus)	Anastasia Prokopenko; Stella Knekna	21; 10	21; 5
4	(Russia) (Cyprus)	Vladimir Ivanov / Ivan Sozonov; Demetris Kyprianou / Nikolas Panayiotou	21; 14	21; 13
5	(Russia) (Cyprus)	Valeria Sorokina / Nina Vislova; Dometia Ioannou / Stella Knekna	21; 8	21; 5

==== Wales vs Sweden ====
Wales
0
Sporthallen Zuid, Court 5
16 February 2011, 10:00

Sweden
5

			1	2	3
1	(Wales) (Sweden)	Daniel Font; Henri Hurskainen	6; 21	7; 21
2	(Wales) (Sweden)	Sarah Thomas; Jenny Wan	21; 15	22; 20
3	(Wales) (Sweden)	Martyn Lewis / Joe Morgan; Oscar Kruse / Jonatan Nordh	21; 17	15; 21	17; 21
4	(Wales) (Sweden)	Caroline Harvey / Carissa Turner; Emelie Lennartsson / Emma Wengberg	15; 21	16; 21
5	(Wales) (Sweden)	Martyn Lewis / Bethan Higginson; Jonatan Nordh / Amanda Högström	20; 22	16; 21

==== Wales vs Cyprus ====
Wales
4
Sporthallen Zuid, Court 2
17 February 2011, 14:00

Cyprus
1

			1	2	3
1	(Wales) (Cyprus)	Martyn Lewis / Bethan Higginson; Nikolas Panayiotou / Dometia Ioannou	21; 16	21; 10
2	(Wales) (Cyprus)	Daniel Font; Henri Hurskainen	21; 11	21; 16
3	(Wales) (Cyprus)	Sarah Thomas; Stella Knekna	21; 23	18; 21
4	(Wales) (Cyprus)	Martyn Lewis / Joe Morgan; Demetris Kyprianou / Nikolas Panayiotou	21; 12	21; 10
5	(Wales) (Cyprus)	Caroline Harvey / Carissa Turner; Dometia Ioannou / Stella Knekna	21; 14	21; 14

==== Russia vs Sweden ====
Russia
4
Sporthallen Zuid, Court 4
17 February 2011, 14:00

Sweden
1

			1	2	3
1	(Russia) (Sweden)	Alexandr Nikolaenko / Valeria Sorokina; Jonatan Nordh / Amanda Högström	21; 17	21; 16
2	(Russia) (Sweden)	Stanislav Pukhov; Henri Hurskainen	17; 21	17; 21
3	(Russia) (Sweden)	Ella Diehl; Jenny Wan	21; 5	21; 11
4	(Russia) (Sweden)	Vladimir Ivanov / Ivan Sozonov; Oscar Kruse / Jonatan Nordh	21; 13	21; 11
5	(Russia) (Sweden)	Valeria Sorokina / Nina Vislova; Emelie Lennartsson / Emma Wengberg	21; 14	21; 13

=== Group 5 ===
Pos	Team	Pld	W	L	MF	MA	MD	GF	GA	GD	PF	PA	PD	Pts	Qualification
1	Netherlands	3	3	0	10	5	+5	22	11	+11	610	519	+91	3	Knockout stage
2	Switzerland	3	2	1	11	4	+7	22	12	+10	635	556	+79	2	
3	Iceland	3	1	2	5	10	−5	12	21	−9	547	611	−64	1	
4	Lithuania	3	0	3	4	11	−7	11	23	−12	531	637	−106	0	

Source: BWF

==== Lithuania vs Switzerland ====
Lithuania
1
Sporthallen Zuid, Court 2
15 February 2011, 19:00

Switzerland
4

			1	2	3
1	(Lithuania) (Switzerland)	Kęstutis Navickas; Christoph Heiniger	21; 16	21; 15
2	(Lithuania) (Switzerland)	Akvilė Stapušaitytė; Jeanine Cicognini	16; 21	18; 21
3	(Lithuania) (Switzerland)	Povilas Bartušis / Alan Plavin; Christian Bösiger / Anthony Dumartheray	11; 21	18; 21
4	(Lithuania) (Switzerland)	Kristina Dovydaitytė / Gerda Voitechovskaja; Marion Gruber / Sanya Herzig	5; 21	13; 21
5	(Lithuania) (Switzerland)	Kęstutis Navickas / Akvilė Stapušaitytė; Anthony Dumartheray / Sabrina Jaquet	10; 21	21; 18	13; 21

==== Netherlands vs Iceland ====
Netherlands
4
Sporthallen Zuid, Court 3
15 February 2011, 19:00

Iceland
1

			1	2	3
1	(Netherlands) (Iceland)	Jacco Arends / Selena Piek; Magnús Ingi Helgason / Tinna Helgadóttir	7; 14	11; 16
2	(Netherlands) (Iceland)	Rune Massing; Atli Jóhannesson	21; 15	21; 16
3	(Netherlands) (Iceland)	Josephine Wentholt; Ragna Ingólfsdóttir	11; 21	17; 21
4	(Netherlands) (Iceland)	Ruud Bosch / Koen Ridder; Magnús Ingi Helgason / Helgi Jóhannesson	21; 12	21; 14
5	(Netherlands) (Iceland)	Lotte Jonathans / Paulien van Dooremalen; Tinna Helgadóttir / Snjólaug Jóhannsdóttir	21; 10	21; 13

==== Iceland vs Switzerland ====
Iceland
0
Sporthallen Zuid, Court 1
16 February 2011, 19:00

Switzerland
5

			1	2	3
1	(Iceland) (Switzerland)	Magnús Ingi Helgason / Tinna Helgadóttir; Anthony Dumartheray / Sabrina Jaquet	19; 21	16; 21
2	(Iceland) (Switzerland)	Atli Jóhannesson; Christian Bösiger	13; 21	3; 21
3	(Iceland) (Switzerland)	Ragna Ingólfsdóttir; Jeanine Cicognini	18; 21	10; 21
4	(Iceland) (Switzerland)	Magnús Ingi Helgason / Helgi Jóhannesson; Christian Bösiger / Anthony Dumartheray	21; 13	18; 21	16; 21
5	(Iceland) (Switzerland)	Tinna Helgadóttir / Ragna Ingólfsdóttir; Sabrina Jaquet / Nicole Schaller	21; 17	14; 21	18; 21

==== Netherlands vs Lithuania ====
Netherlands
3
Sporthallen Zuid, Court 3
16 February 2011, 19:00

Lithuania
2

			1	2	3
1	(Netherlands) (Lithuania)	Dave Khodabux / Samantha Barning; Kęstutis Navickas / Kristina Dovydaitytė	16; 21	21; 13	16; 21
2	(Netherlands) (Lithuania)	Patty Stolzenbach; Akvilė Stapušaitytė	21; 7	12; 21	21; 15
3	(Netherlands) (Lithuania)	Saber Afif; Kęstutis Navickas	11; 21	10; 21
4	(Netherlands) (Lithuania)	Selena Piek / Iris Tabeling; Kristina Dovydaitytė / Akvilė Stapušaitytė	21; 11	21; 19
5	(Netherlands) (Lithuania)	Jorrit de Ruiter / Dave Khodabux; Povilas Bartušis / Alan Plavin	21; 11	21; 8

==== Iceland vs Lithuania ====
Iceland
4
Sporthallen Zuid, Court 2
17 February 2011, 19:00

Lithuania
1

			1	2	3
1	(Iceland) (Lithuania)	Magnús Ingi Helgason / Tinna Helgadóttir; Kęstutis Navickas / Kristina Dovydaitytė	21; 15	17; 21	21; 15
2	(Iceland) (Lithuania)	Ragna Ingólfsdóttir; Akvilė Stapušaitytė	21; 8	21; 11
3	(Iceland) (Lithuania)	Helgi Jóhannesson; Kęstutis Navickas	10; 21	13; 21
4	(Iceland) (Lithuania)	Tinna Helgadóttir / Ragna Ingólfsdóttir; Kristina Dovydaitytė / Akvilė Stapušaitytė	21; 19	21; 19
5	(Iceland) (Lithuania)	Magnús Ingi Helgason / Helgi Jóhannesson; Povilas Bartušis / Alan Plavin	21; 10	21; 15

==== Netherlands vs Switzerland ====
Russia
4
Sporthallen Zuid, Court 3
17 February 2011, 19:00

Sweden
1

			1	2	3
1	(Russia) (Sweden)	Ruud Bosch / Lotte Jonathans; Anthony Dumartheray / Sabrina Jaquet	21; 14	21; 14
2	(Russia) (Sweden)	Rune Massing; Christian Bösiger	17; 21	21; 19	15; 21
3	(Russia) (Sweden)	Patty Stolzenbach; Jeanine Cicognini	16; 21	16; 21
4	(Russia) (Sweden)	Ruud Bosch / Koen Ridder; Thomas Heiniger / Florian Schmid	21; 6	21; 6
5	(Russia) (Sweden)	Lotte Jonathans / Paulien van Dooremalen; Jeanine Cicognini / Sabrina Jaquet	21; 15	22; 20

=== Group 6 ===
Pos	Team	Pld	W	L	MF	MA	MD	GF	GA	GD	PF	PA	PD	Pts	Qualification
1	France	3	3	0	12	3	+9	25	8	+17	654	529	+125	3	Knockout stage
2	Scotland	3	2	1	11	4	+7	23	12	+11	668	582	+86	2	
3	Spain	3	1	2	7	8	−1	17	18	−1	654	642	+12	1	
4	Slovakia	3	0	3	0	15	−15	3	30	−27	462	685	−223	0	

Source: BWF

==== France vs Slovakia ====
France
5
Sporthallen Zuid, Court 1
16 February 2011, 10:00

Slovakia
0

			1	2	3
1	(France) (Slovakia)	Sylvain Grosjean / Émilie Lefel; Vladimír Závada / Zuzana Orlovská	21; 13	21; 8
2	(France) (Slovakia)	Matthieu Lo Ying Ping; Jarolím Vícen	21; 12	21; 12
3	(France) (Slovakia)	Perrine Le Buhanic; Monika Fašungová	21; 14	21; 16
4	(France) (Slovakia)	Baptiste Carême / Sylvain Grosjean; Michal Matejka / Vladimír Závada	21; 11	21; 9
5	(France) (Slovakia)	Émilie Lefel / Marion Luttmann; Jana Čižnárová / Zuzana Orlovská	21; 15	21; 15

==== Spain vs Scotland ====
Spain
1
Sporthallen Zuid, Court 4
16 February 2011, 10:00

Scotland
4

			1	2	3
1	(Spain) (Scotland)	Carolina Marín; Susan Egelstaff	21; 13	17; 21	17; 21
2	(Spain) (Scotland)	Pablo Abián; Kieran Merrilees	21; 15	21; 18
3	(Spain) (Scotland)	Laura Molina / Haideé Ojeda; Jillie Cooper / Emma Mason	23; 21	14; 21	9; 21
4	(Spain) (Scotland)	David Leal / Eliezer Ojeda; Jamie Neill / Keith Turnbull	17; 21	19; 21
5	(Spain) (Scotland)	Carlos Longo / Haideé Ojeda; Paul van Rietvelde / Imogen Bankier	18; 21	11; 21

==== France vs Spain ====
France
5
Sporthallen Zuid, Court 4
16 February 2011, 19:00

Spain
0

			1	2	3
1	(France) (Spain)	Baptiste Carême / Laura Choinet; Carlos Longo / Haideé Ojeda	21; 13	21; 16
2	(France) (Spain)	Brice Leverdez; Pablo Abián	21; 15	15; 21	21; 19
3	(France) (Spain)	Perrine Le Buhanic; Carolina Marín	17; 21	17; 21
4	(France) (Spain)	Baptiste Carême / Sylvain Grosjean; David Leal / Eliezer Ojeda	21; 14	21; 16
5	(France) (Spain)	Laura Choinet / Audrey Fontaine; Laura Molina / Haideé Ojeda	21; 18	27; 25

==== Slovakia vs Scotland ====
Slovakia
0
Sporthallen Zuid, Court 6
16 February 2011, 19:00

Scotland
5

			1	2	3
1	(Slovakia) (Scotland)	Vladimír Závada / Zuzana Orlovská; Paul van Rietvelde / Imogen Bankier	14; 21	11; 21
2	(Slovakia) (Scotland)	Michal Matejka; Kieran Merrilees	13; 21	21; 18	17; 21
3	(Slovakia) (Scotland)	Jana Čižnárová; Linda Sloan	18; 21	15; 21
4	(Slovakia) (Scotland)	Jarolím Vícen / Vladimír Závada; Jamie Neill / Keith Turnbull	11; 21	15; 21
5	(Slovakia) (Scotland)	Monika Fašungová / Zuzana Orlovská; Jillie Cooper / Emma Mason	9; 21	9; 21

==== France vs Scotland ====
France
3
Sporthallen Zuid, Court 3
17 February 2011, 14:00

Scotland
2

			1	2	3
1	(France) (Scotland)	Baptiste Carême / Laura Choinet; Paul van Rietvelde / Imogen Bankier	13; 21	21; 19	12; 21
2	(France) (Scotland)	Brice Leverdez; Kieran Merrilees	13; 15	21; 8	17
3	(France) (Scotland)	Perrine Le Buhanic; Susan Egelstaff	19; 21	14; 21
4	(France) (Scotland)	Baptiste Carême / Sylvain Grosjean; Jamie Neill / Keith Turnbull	21; 19	21; 10
5	(France) (Scotland)	Laura Choinet / Émilie Lefel; Jillie Cooper / Emma Mason	16; 21	21; 11	21; 18

==== Slovakia vs Spain ====
Slovakia
4
Sporthallen Zuid, Court 5
17 February 2011, 14:00

Spain
1

			1	2	3
1	(Slovakia) (Spain)	Vladimír Závada / Zuzana Orlovská; Carlos Longo / Haideé Ojeda	14; 21	11; 21
2	(Slovakia) (Spain)	Michal Matejka; Ernesto Velázquez	18; 21	22; 20	8; 21
3	(Slovakia) (Spain)	Monika Fašungová; Beatriz Corrales	14; 21	15; 21
4	(Slovakia) (Spain)	Jarolím Vícen / Vladimír Závada; David Leal / Eliezer Ojeda	21; 17	19; 21	15; 21
5	(Slovakia) (Spain)	Jana Čižnárová / Zuzana Orlovská; Laura Molina / Haideé Ojeda	11; 21	16; 21

=== Group 7 ===
Pos	Team	Pld	W	L	MF	MA	MD	GF	GA	GD	PF	PA	PD	Pts	Qualification
1	Bulgaria	3	3	0	11	4	+7	23	10	+13	643	519	+124	3	Knockout stage
2	Ukraine	3	2	1	11	4	+7	24	11	+13	671	593	+78	2	
3	Finland	3	1	2	7	8	−1	16	18	−2	612	613	−1	1	
4	Hungary	3	0	3	1	14	−13	5	29	−24	497	698	−201	0	

Source: BWF

==== Finland vs Bulgaria ====
Finland
1
Sporthallen Zuid, Court 1
15 February 2011, 19:00

Bulgaria
4

			1	2	3
1	(Finland) (Bulgaria)	Eetu Heino; Krasimir Jankov	16; 21	18; 21
2	(Finland) (Bulgaria)	Anu Nieminen; Petya Nedelcheva	12; 21	21; 16	18; 21
3	(Finland) (Bulgaria)	Ville Lång / Mikko Vikman; Peyo Boychinov / Stiliyan Makarski	21; 17	21; 19
4	(Finland) (Bulgaria)	Sanni Rautala / Nanna Vainio; Petya Nedelcheva / Dimitria Popstoikova	13; 21	16; 21
5	(Finland) (Bulgaria)	Ville Lång / Anu Nieminen; Stiliyan Makarski / Diana Dimova	12; 21	18; 21

==== Ukraine vs Hungary ====
Ukraine
5
Sporthallen Zuid, Court 6
15 February 2011, 19:00

Hungary
0

			1	2	3
1	(Ukraine) (Hungary)	Marija Ulitina; Mónika Szőke	16; 21	21; 14	21; 10
2	(Ukraine) (Hungary)	Valeriy Atraschenkov; Henrik Tóth	21; 14	19; 21	21; 19
3	(Ukraine) (Hungary)	Larisa Griga / Anna Kobceva; Sára Fekete / Zsófia Horváth	21; 5	23; 21
4	(Ukraine) (Hungary)	Vitaly Konov / Dmytro Zavadsky; András Németh / Csaba Szikra	21; 10	21; 13
5	(Ukraine) (Hungary)	Evgen Pochtarev / Elena Prus; Márton Szatzker / Sára Fekete	23; 21	21; 19

==== Ukraine vs Finland ====
Ukraine
4
Sporthallen Zuid, Court 4
16 February 2011, 14:00

Finland
1

			1	2	3
1	(Ukraine) (Finland)	Valeriy Atraschenkov / Elena Prus; Anton Kaisti / Sanni Rautala	21; 12	22; 20
2	(Ukraine) (Finland)	Dmytro Zavadsky; Ville Lång	21; 15	9; 21	16; 21
3	(Ukraine) (Finland)	Larisa Griga; Anu Nieminen	21; 16	21; 11
4	(Ukraine) (Finland)	Valeriy Atraschenkov / Vladislav Druzchenko; Ville Lång / Mikko Vikman	16; 21	21; 17	21; 10
5	(Ukraine) (Finland)	Anna Kobceva / Elena Prus; Anu Nieminen / Sanni Rautala	21; 17	21; 19

==== Hungary vs Bulgaria ====
Hungary
1
Sporthallen Zuid, Court 5
16 February 2011, 14:00

Bulgaria
4

			1	2	3
1	(Hungary) (Bulgaria)	Mónika Szőke; Linda Zetchiri	5; 21	5; 21
2	(Hungary) (Bulgaria)	Henrik Tóth; Stiliyan Makarski	15; 21	21; 16	21; 18
3	(Hungary) (Bulgaria)	Sára Fekete / Zsófia Horváth; Petya Nedelcheva / Dimitria Popstoikova	13; 21	10; 21
4	(Hungary) (Bulgaria)	András Németh / Csaba Szikra; Peyo Boychinov / Krasimir Jankov	15; 21	13; 21
5	(Hungary) (Bulgaria)	Márton Szatzker / Sára Fekete; Stiliyan Makarski / Diana Dimova	11; 21	13; 21

==== Hungary vs Finland ====
Hungary
4
Sporthallen Zuid, Court 1
17 February 2011, 10:00

Finland
1

			1	2	3
1	(Hungary) (Finland)	Mónika Szőke; Nanna Vainio	13; 21	14; 21
2	(Hungary) (Finland)	András Németh; Ville Lång	16; 21	6; 21
3	(Hungary) (Finland)	Sára Fekete / Zsófia Horváth; Anu Nieminen / Sanni Rautala	21; 23	9; 21
4	(Hungary) (Finland)	András Németh / Csaba Szikra; Ville Lång / Mikko Vikman	15; 21	16; 21
5	(Hungary) (Finland)	Márton Szatzker / Sára Fekete; Anton Kaisti / Sanni Rautala	16; 21	21; 14	15; 21

==== Ukraine vs Bulgaria ====
Russia
2
Sporthallen Zuid, Court 4
17 February 2011, 10:00

Sweden
3

			1	2	3
1	(Russia) (Sweden)	Valeriy Atraschenkov / Elena Prus; Stiliyan Makarski / Diana Dimova	17; 21	21; 14	16; 21
2	(Russia) (Sweden)	Dmytro Zavadsky; Krasimir Jankov	21; 14	21; 16
3	(Russia) (Sweden)	Larisa Griga; Linda Zetchiri	12; 21	16; 21
4	(Russia) (Sweden)	Valeriy Atraschenkov / Vladislav Druzchenko; Stiliyan Makarski / Krasimir Jankov	21; 17	21; 13
5	(Russia) (Sweden)	Anna Kobceva / Elena Prus; Petya Nedelcheva / Dimitria Popstoikova	16; 17	9; 19

=== Group 8 ===
Pos	Team	Pld	W	L	MF	MA	MD	GF	GA	GD	PF	PA	PD	Pts	Qualification
1	Poland	3	3	0	11	4	+7	25	10	+15	664	523	+141	3	Knockout stage
2	Croatia	3	2	1	8	7	+1	18	16	+2	614	572	+42	2	
3	Portugal	3	1	2	6	9	−3	13	20	−7	543	622	−79	1	
4	Belarus	3	0	3	5	10	−5	12	22	−10	549	653	−104	0	

Source: BWF

==== Poland vs Portugal ====
Poland
4
Sporthallen Zuid, Court 3
16 February 2011, 14:00

Portugal
1

			1	2	3
1	(Poland) (Portugal)	Robert Mateusiak / Nadieżda Zięba; Alexandre Paixão / Filipa Lamy	21; 16	21; 10
2	(Poland) (Portugal)	Hubert Pączek; Pedro Martins	12; 21	21; 17	20; 22
3	(Poland) (Portugal)	Kamila Augustyn; Ana Moura	21; 14	21; 6
4	(Poland) (Portugal)	Adam Cwalina / Michał Łogosz; Gil Martins / Alexandre Paixão	21; 18	22; 20
5	(Poland) (Portugal)	Małgorzata Kurdelska / Nadieżda Zięba; Filipa Lamy / Helena Pestana	21; 6	21; 8

==== Belarus vs Croatia ====
Belarus
1
Sporthallen Zuid, Court 6
16 February 2011, 14:00

Croatia
4

			1	2	3
1	(Belarus) (Croatia)	Aleksei Konakh / Vlada Chernyavskaya; Zvonimir Đurkinjak / Staša Poznanović	16; 21	7; 21
2	(Belarus) (Croatia)	Yauheni Yakauchuk; Luka Zdenjak	15; 21	21; 12	19; 21
3	(Belarus) (Croatia)	Alesia Zaitsava; Andrea Žvorc	15; 21	16; 21
4	(Belarus) (Croatia)	Aleksei Konakh / Yauheni Yakauchuk; Zvonimir Đurkinjak / Zvonimir Hölbling	11; 21	15; 21
5	(Belarus) (Croatia)	Vlada Chernyavskaya / Alesia Zaitsava; Staša Poznanović / Andrea Žvorc	21; 18	23; 21

==== Poland vs Belarus ====
Poland
4
Sporthallen Zuid, Court 2
17 February 2011, 10:00

Belarus
1

			1	2	3
1	(Poland) (Belarus)	Robert Mateusiak / Kamila Augustyn; Aleksei Konakh / Alesia Zaitsava	21; 13	21; 18
2	(Poland) (Belarus)	Michał Rogalski; Yauheni Yakauchuk	19; 21	24; 22	21; 12
3	(Poland) (Belarus)	Małgorzata Kurdelska; Viktoryia Varabyova	15; 21	21; 15	17; 21
4	(Poland) (Belarus)	Adam Cwalina / Michał Łogosz; Aleksei Konakh / Vitaliy Primak	21; 7	21; 9
5	(Poland) (Belarus)	Kamila Augustyn / Nadieżda Zięba; Vlada Chernyavskaya / Viktoryia Varabyova	21; 8	21; 5

==== Portugal vs Croatia ====
Portugal
3
Sporthallen Zuid, Court 5
17 February 2011, 10:00

Croatia
2

			1	2	3
1	(Portugal) (Croatia)	Alexandre Paixão / Filipa Lamy; Zvonimir Đurkinjak / Staša Poznanović	18; 21	8; 21
2	(Portugal) (Croatia)	Pedro Martins; Luka Zdenjak	25; 23	21; 16
3	(Portugal) (Croatia)	Helena Pestana; Andrea Žvorc	21; 15	17; 21	21; 14
4	(Portugal) (Croatia)	Gil Martins / Alexandre Paixão; Zvonimir Đurkinjak / Zvonimir Hölbling	10; 21	11; 21
5	(Portugal) (Croatia)	Filipa Lamy / Helena Pestana; Staša Poznanović / Maja Šavor	21; 14	21; 15

==== Poland vs Croatia ====
Poland
3
Sporthallen Zuid, Court 5
17 February 2011, 19:00

Croatia
2

			1	2	3
1	(Poland) (Croatia)	Robert Mateusiak / Nadieżda Zięba; Zvonimir Đurkinjak / Staša Poznanović	21; 16	21; 9
2	(Poland) (Croatia)	Hubert Pączek; Luka Zdenjak	21; 16	21; 8
3	(Poland) (Croatia)	Kamila Augustyn; Andrea Žvorc	16; 21	21; 11	21; 13
4	(Poland) (Croatia)	Adam Cwalina / Michał Łogosz; Zvonimir Đurkinjak / Zvonimir Hölbling	21; 15	19; 21	17; 21
5	(Poland) (Croatia)	Małgorzata Kurdelska / Nadieżda Zięba; Staša Poznanović / Maja Šavor				w/o

==== Portugal vs Belarus ====
Portugal
2
Sporthallen Zuid, Court 6
17 February 2011, 19:00

Belarus
3

			1	2	3
1	(Portugal) (Belarus)	Alexandre Paixão / Filipa Lamy; Yauheni Yakauchuk / Vlada Chernyavskaya	21; 17	21; 13
2	(Portugal) (Belarus)	Pedro Martins; Vitaliy Primak	21; 9	21; 14
3	(Portugal) (Belarus)	Helena Pestana; Alesia Zaitsava	14; 21	13; 21
4	(Portugal) (Belarus)	Gil Martins / Alexandre Paixão; Aleksei Konakh / Yauheni Yakauchuk	21; 19	16; 21	16; 21
5	(Portugal) (Belarus)	Filipa Lamy / Helena Pestana; Vlada Chernyavskaya / Alesia Zaitsava	12; 14	15; 15

== Knockout stage ==
Quarterfinals
18 February
Denmark	3
Poland	0
18 February
England	3
Bulgaria	1
18 February
Netherlands	0
Russia	3
18 February
France	0
Germany	3

Semifinals
19 February
Denmark	3
England	1
19 February
Russia	1
Germany	3

Final
20 February
Denmark	3
Germany	1

=== Quarterfinals ===
Denmark
3
Sporthallen Zuid
18 February 2011

Poland
0

			1	2	3
1	(Denmark) (Poland)	Tine Baun; Malgorzata Kurdelska	21; 15	21; 5
2	(Denmark) (Poland)	Jan Ø. Jørgensen; Hubert Paczek	22; 20	21; 12
3	(Denmark) (Poland)	Kamilla Rytter Juhl / Marie Røpke; Kamila Augustyn / Nadiezda Zieba	15; 21	22; 20	21; 17
4	(Denmark) (Poland)	Mathias Boe / Anders Kristiansen; Adam Cwalina / Michal Logosz				not played
5	(Denmark) (Poland)	Joachim Fischer Nielsen / Christinna Pedersen; Robert Mateusiak / Nadiezda Zieba				not played

England
3
Sporthallen Zuid
18 February 2011

Bulgaria
1

			1	2	3
1	(England) (Bulgaria)	Kate Robertshaw; Linda Zechiri	11; 21	16; 21
2	(England) (Bulgaria)	Carl Baxter; Blagovest Kisyov	21; 9	21; 7
3	(England) (Bulgaria)	Jenny Wallwork / Gabrielle White; Petya Nedelcheva / Dimitria Popstoykova	21; 16	22; 20
4	(England) (Bulgaria)	Anthony Clark / Chris Langridge; Peyo Boychinov / Krasimir Yankov	21; 9	21; 10
5	(England) (Bulgaria)	Nathan Robertson / Jenny Wallwork; Stiliyan Makarski / Diana Dimova				not played

Netherlands
0
Sporthallen Zuid
18 February 2011

Russia
3

			1	2	3
1	(Netherlands) (Russia)	Ruud Bosch / Lotte Jonathans; Evgeniy Dremin / Valeria Sorokina	19; 21	13; 21
2	(Netherlands) (Russia)	Rune Massing; Stanislav Pukhov	20; 22	11; 21
3	(Netherlands) (Russia)	Patty Stolzenbach; Ella Diehl	7; 21	15; 21
4	(Netherlands) (Russia)	Ruud Bosch / Koen Ridder; Vladimir Ivanov / Ivan Sozonov				not played
5	(Netherlands) (Russia)	Lotte Jonathans / Paulien van Dooremalen; Valeria Sorokina / Nina Vislova				not played

France
0
Sporthallen Zuid
18 February 2011

Germany
3

			1	2	3
1	(France) (Germany)	Baptiste Carême / Laura Choinet; Michael Fuchs / Birgit Michels	11; 21	21; 17	12; 21
2	(France) (Germany)	Brice Leverdez; Marc Zwiebler	9; 21	12; 21
3	(France) (Germany)	Perrine Le Buhanic; Juliane Schenk	4; 21	3; 21
4	(France) (Germany)	Baptiste Carême / Sylvain Grosjean; Ingo Kindervater / Johannes Schöttler				not played
5	(France) (Germany)	Laura Choinet / Audrey Fontaine; Sandra Marinello / Birgit Michels				not played

=== Semifinals ===
Denmark
3
Sporthallen Zuid
19 February 2011

England
1

			1	2	3
1	(Denmark) (England)	Tine Baun; Sarah Walker	21; 8	21; 7
2	(Denmark) (England)	Jan Ø. Jørgensen; Rajiv Ouseph	21; 13	11; 21	12; 21
3	(Denmark) (England)	Christinna Pedersen / Kamilla Rytter Juhl; Jenny Wallwork / Gabrielle White	21; 14	21; 16
4	(Denmark) (England)	Mathias Boe / Carsten Mogensen; Chris Adcock / Andrew Ellis	27; 29	21; 19	21; 17
5	(Denmark) (England)	Joachim Fischer Nielsen / Christinna Pedersen; Nathan Robertson / Jenny Wallwork				not played

Russia
1
Sporthallen Zuid
19 February 2011

Germany
3

			1	2	3
1	(Russia) (Germany)	Ella Diehl; Juliane Schenk	10; 21	19; 21
2	(Russia) (Germany)	Stanislav Pukhov; Marc Zwiebler	12; 21	14; 21
3	(Russia) (Germany)	Valeria Sorokina / Nina Vislova; Sandra Marinello / Birgit Michels	13; 21	21; 17	21; 15
4	(Russia) (Germany)	Evgeniy Dremin / Ivan Sozonov; Ingo Kindervater / Johannes Schoettler	15; 21	17; 21
5	(Russia) (Germany)	Vitalij Durkin / Nina Vislova; Michael Fuchs / Birgit Michels				not played

=== Final ===
Denmark
3
Sporthallen Zuid
20 February 2011

Germany
1

			1	2	3
1	(Denmark) (Germany)	Karina Jørgensen; Juliane Schenk	16; 21	19; 21
2	(Denmark) (Germany)	Jan Ø. Jørgensen; Marc Zwiebler	21; 18	21; 15
3	(Denmark) (Germany)	Christinna Pedersen / Kamilla Rytter Juhl; Sandra Marinello / Birgit Michels	21; 17	21; 12
4	(Denmark) (Germany)	Mathias Boe / Carsten Mogensen; Ingo Kindervater / Johannes Schoettler	21; 13	21; 16
5	(Denmark) (Germany)	Joachim Fischer Nielsen / Christinna Pedersen; Michael Fuchs / Birgit Michels				not played
