= 2009 European Mixed Team Badminton Championships =

Tournament details
- Dates: 10-15 February 2009
- Venue: Echo Arena
- Location: Liverpool, England

The 2009 European Mixed Team Badminton Championships were held at the Echo Arena in Liverpool, England, from 10-15 February, and were organised by the Badminton Europe and the Badminton England. It was the 20th edition of the tournament. Denmark was the defending champion. This is the first edition of European Mixed Team Badminton Championships which is not held together with the individual European Championships. The event also saw two bronze medals awarded for both losing semifinalist.

Denmark defeated England in the final 3–2 to defend their title.

== Medalists ==
Event	Gold	Silver	Bronze
Mixed Team	Denmark	England	Russia Poland

== Group stage ==
=== Group 1 ===
Pos	Team	Pld	W	L	MF	MA	MD	GF	GA	GD	PF	PA	PD	Pts	Qualification
1	Denmark	3	3	0	14	1	+13	29	2	+27	646	334	+312	3	Knockout stage
2	Ireland	3	2	1	10	5	+5	21	14	+7	626	603	+23	2	
3	Spain	3	1	2	3	12	−9	8	25	−17	467	641	−174	1	
4	Slovenia	3	0	3	3	12	−9	9	26	−17	516	677	−161	0	

Source: BWF

==== Denmark vs Spain ====
Denmark
5
Echo Arena, Court 5
11 February 2009, 10:00

Spain
0

			1	2	3
1	(Denmark) (Spain)	Joachim Persson; Pablo Abián	19; 21	21; 19	18; 21
2	(Denmark) (Spain)	Nanna Brosolat Jensen; Beatriz Corrales	21; 13	21; 13
3	(Denmark) (Spain)	Thomas Laybourn / Carsten Mogensen; Carlos Longo / Eliezer Ojeda	21; 7	21; 11
4	(Denmark) (Spain)	Kamilla Rytter Juhl / Marie Røpke; Carolina Marín / Ana María Martín	21; 15	21; 14
5	(Denmark) (Spain)	Joachim Fischer Nielsen / Christinna Pedersen; Eliezer Ojeda / Haideé Ojeda	21; 9	21; 10

==== Slovenia vs Ireland ====
Slovenia
2
Echo Arena, Court 6
11 February 2009, 10:00

Ireland
3

			1	2	3
1	(Slovenia) (Republic of Ireland)	Luka Petrič / Špela Silvester; Sam Magee / Chloe Magee	18; 21	21; 17	15; 21
2	(Slovenia) (Republic of Ireland)	Iztok Utroša; Scott Evans	12; 21	8; 21
3	(Slovenia) (Republic of Ireland)	Maja Tvrdy; Chloe Magee	21; 15	21; 17
4	(Slovenia) (Republic of Ireland)	Luka Petrič / Iztok Utroša; Scott Evans / Sam Magee	12; 21	19; 21
5	(Slovenia) (Republic of Ireland)	Špela Silvester / Maja Tvrdy; Sinead Chambers / Dona Scott	21; 18	21; 11

==== Denmark vs Slovenia ====
Denmark
5
Echo Arena, Court 4
12 February 2009, 10:00

Slovenia
0

			1	2	3
1	(Denmark) (Slovenia)	Jan O. Jorgensen; Luka Petrič	21; 13	21; 11
2	(Denmark) (Slovenia)	Nanna Brosolat Jensen; Maja Tvrdy	21; 18	21; 17
3	(Denmark) (Slovenia)	Thomas Laybourn / Carsten Mogensen; Luka Petrič / Iztok Utroša	21; 10	21; 7
4	(Denmark) (Slovenia)	Tine Rasmussen / Marie Røpke; Nika Končut / Špela Silvester	21; 9	21; 7
5	(Denmark) (Slovenia)	Joachim Fischer Nielsen / Christinna Pedersen; Iztok Utroša / Maja Tvrdy	21; 13	21; 15

==== Spain vs Ireland ====
Spain
2
Echo Arena, Court 5
12 February 2009, 10:00

Ireland
3

			1	2	3
1	(Spain) (Republic of Ireland)	Pablo Abián; Scott Evans	15; 21	21; 19	21; 19
2	(Spain) (Republic of Ireland)	Carolina Marín; Chloe Magee	21; 15	17; 21	21; 23
3	(Spain) (Republic of Ireland)	Pablo Abián / Carlos Longo; Scott Evans / Sam Magee	8; 21	17; 21
4	(Spain) (Republic of Ireland)	Carolina Marín / Ana María Martín; Sinead Chambers / Dona Scott	20; 22	21; 10	21; 14
5	(Spain) (Republic of Ireland)	Carlos Longo / Haideé Ojeda; Sam Magee / Chloe Magee	21; 16	12; 21	20; 22

==== Spain vs Slovenia ====
Spain
4
Echo Arena, Court 5
12 February 2009, 18:00

Slovenia
1

			1	2	3
1	(Spain) (Slovenia)	Carlos Longo / Haideé Ojeda; Iztok Utroša / Špela Silvester	21; 15	21; 19
2	(Spain) (Slovenia)	Pablo Abián; Scott Evans	20; 22	21; 7	21; 10
3	(Spain) (Slovenia)	Carolina Marín; Maja Tvrdy	22; 20	10; 21	23; 21
4	(Spain) (Slovenia)	Carlos Longo / Eliezer Ojeda; Luka Petrič / Iztok Utroša	16; 21	21; 18	21; 19
5	(Spain) (Slovenia)	Carolina Marín / Ana María Martín; Špela Silvester / Maja Tvrdy	21; 18	21; 19

==== Denmark vs Ireland ====
Denmark
5
Echo Arena, Court 6
12 February 2009, 18:00

Ireland
0

			1	2	3
1	(Denmark) (Republic of Ireland)	Joachim Persson; Scott Evans	21; 13	21; 18
2	(Denmark) (Republic of Ireland)	Nanna Brosolat Jensen; Chloe Magee	24; 22	21; 15
3	(Denmark) (Republic of Ireland)	Mathias Boe / Carsten Mogensen; Matthew Gleave / Sam Magee	21; 10	21; 10
4	(Denmark) (Republic of Ireland)	Christinna Pedersen / Marie Røpke; Sinead Chambers / Dona Scott	21; 8	21; 8
5	(Denmark) (Republic of Ireland)	Thomas Laybourn / Kamilla Rytter Juhl; Scott Evans / Chloe Magee	21; 11	21; 19

=== Group 2 ===
Pos	Team	Pld	W	L	MF	MA	MD	GF	GA	GD	PF	PA	PD	Pts	Qualification
1	France	3	3	0	13	2	+11	28	6	+22	692	499	+193	3	Knockout stage
2	Switzerland	3	2	1	9	6	+3	21	15	+6	694	621	+73	2	
3	Portugal	3	1	2	7	8	−1	17	18	−1	589	621	−32	1	
4	Cyprus	3	0	3	1	14	−13	2	29	−27	411	645	−234	0	

Source: BWF

==== France vs Cyprus ====
France
5
Echo Arena, Court 1
11 February 2009, 10:00

Cyprus
0

			1	2	3
1	(France) (Cyprus)	Matthieu Lo Ying Ping; Charis Charalambous	21; 8	21; 8
2	(France) (Cyprus)	Barbara Matias; Dometia Ioannou	21; 7	21; 14
3	(France) (Cyprus)	Laurent Constantin / Sylvain Grosjean; Charis Charalambous / Vasilis Vasou	21; 11	21; 15
4	(France) (Cyprus)	Pi Hongyan / Weny Rahmawati; Maria Ioannou / Dometia Ioannou	21; 12	21; 13
5	(France) (Cyprus)	Baptiste Carême / Laura Choinet; Vasilis Vasou / Maria Ioannou	21; 19	21; 14

==== Portugal vs Switzerland ====
Portugal
2
Echo Arena, Court 2
11 February 2009, 10:00

Switzerland
3

			1	2	3
1	(Portugal) (Switzerland)	Alexandre Paixão / Telma Santos; Anthony Dumartheray / Sabrina Jaquet	14; 21	21; 17	21; 18
2	(Portugal) (Switzerland)	Pedro Martins; Christian Bösiger	21; 17	22; 20
3	(Portugal) (Switzerland)	Telma Santos; Jeanine Cicognini	13; 21	21; 16	9; 21
4	(Portugal) (Switzerland)	Gil Martins / Alexandre Paixão; Christian Bösiger / Anthony Dumartheray	21; 17	17; 21	12; 21
5	(Portugal) (Switzerland)	Helena Pestana / Ana Reis; Jeanine Cicognini / Sabrina Jaquet	14; 21	12; 21

==== Cyprus vs Switzerland ====
Cyprus
5
Echo Arena, Court 3
11 February 2009, 18:00

Switzerland
0

			1	2	3
1	(Cyprus) (Switzerland)	Vasilis Vasou / Maria Ioannou; Anthony Dumartheray / Sabrina Jaquet	13; 21	9; 21
2	(Cyprus) (Switzerland)	Charis Charalambous; Livio Dorizzi	15; 21	12; 21
3	(Cyprus) (Switzerland)	Dometia Ioannou; Monika Fischer	18; 21	20; 22
4	(Cyprus) (Switzerland)	Charis Charalambous / Vasilis Vasou; Christian Bösiger / Anthony Dumartheray	16; 21	16; 21
5	(Cyprus) (Switzerland)	Dometia Ioannou / Maria Ioannou; Jeanine Cicognini / Sabrina Jaquet	15; 21	8; 21

==== France vs Portugal ====
France
4
Echo Arena, Court 4
11 February 2009, 18:00

Portugal
1

			1	2	3
1	(France) (Portugal)	Baptiste Carême / Laura Choinet; Alexandre Paixão / Telma Santos	21; 14	21; 17
2	(France) (Portugal)	Brice Leverdez; Pedro Martins	19; 21	21; 11	13; 21
3	(France) (Portugal)	Pi Hongyan; Telma Santos	21; 13	21; 7
4	(France) (Portugal)	Baptiste Carême / Sylvain Grosjean; Gil Martins / Alexandre Paixão	21; 13	21; 16
5	(France) (Portugal)	Laura Choinet / Weny Rahmawati; Helena Pestana / Ana Reis	14; 7	12; 7

==== France vs Switzerland ====
France
5
Echo Arena, Court 5
12 February 2009, 14:00

Switzerland
0

			1	2	3
1	(France) (Switzerland)	Baptiste Carême / Laura Choinet; Anthony Dumartheray / Sabrina Jaquet	21; 12	17; 21	21; 16
2	(France) (Switzerland)	Brice Leverdez; Christian Bösiger	21; 12	21; 19
3	(France) (Switzerland)	Pi Hongyan; Jeanine Cicognini	21; 15	21; 18
4	(France) (Switzerland)	Baptiste Carême / Sylvain Grosjean; Christian Bösiger / Anthony Dumartheray	21; 15	14; 21	21; 18
5	(France) (Switzerland)	Laura Choinet / Weny Rahmawati; Jeanine Cicognini / Sabrina Jaquet	21; 19	20; 22	21; 23

==== Cyprus vs Portugal ====
Cyprus
1
Echo Arena, Court 6
12 February 2009, 14:00

Portugal
4

			1	2	3
1	(Cyprus) (Portugal)	Vasilis Vasou / Maria Ioannou; Alexandre Paixão / Telma Santos	14; 21	20; 22
2	(Cyprus) (Portugal)	Charis Charalambous; Pedro Martins	5; 21	4; 21
3	(Cyprus) (Portugal)	Dometia Ioannou; Telma Santos	15; 21	8; 21
4	(Cyprus) (Portugal)	Charis Charalambous / Vasilis Vasou; Gil Martins / Alexandre Paixão	16; 21	7; 21
5	(Cyprus) (Portugal)	Dometia Ioannou / Maria Ioannou; Helena Pestana / Ana Reis	17; 21	21; 19	21; 15

=== Group 3 ===
Pos	Team	Pld	W	L	MF	MA	MD	GF	GA	GD	PF	PA	PD	Pts	Qualification
1	Germany	3	3	0	14	1	+13	29	3	+26	667	438	+229	3	Knockout stage
2	Sweden	3	2	1	9	6	+3	20	15	+5	629	587	+42	2	
3	Estonia	3	1	2	6	9	−3	14	19	−5	573	594	−21	1	
4	Slovakia	3	0	3	1	14	−13	2	28	−26	373	623	−250	0	

Source: BWF

==== Germany vs Slovakia ====
Germany
5
Echo Arena, Court 5
10 February 2009, 14:00

Slovakia
0

			1	2	3
1	(Germany) (Slovakia)	Johannes Schöttler / Birgit Overzier; Jarolím Vícen / Gabriela Zabavníková	26; 24	21; 15
2	(Germany) (Slovakia)	Marc Zwiebler; Michal Matejka	21; 10	21; 14
3	(Germany) (Slovakia)	Huaiwen Xu; Zuzana Orlovská	21; 7	21; 14
4	(Germany) (Slovakia)	Tim Dettmann / Michael Fuchs; Michal Matejka / Jarolím Vícen	21; 4	21; 8
5	(Germany) (Slovakia)	Sandra Marinello / Juliane Schenk; Zuzana Orlovská / Gabriela Zabavníková	21; 13	21; 9

==== Estonia vs Sweden ====
Estonia
5
Echo Arena, Court 6
10 February 2009, 14:00

Sweden
0

			1	2	3
1	(Estonia) (Sweden)	Ants Mängel / Karoliine Hõim; Joel Johansson-Berg / Emma Wengberg	15; 21	18; 21
2	(Estonia) (Sweden)	Raul Must; Henri Hurskainen	21; 10	16; 21	21; 15
3	(Estonia) (Sweden)	Kati Tolmoff; Sophia Hansson	21; 8	21; 12
4	(Estonia) (Sweden)	Raul Käsner / Ants Mängel; Joel Johansson-Berg / Johan Kasperi	21; 21	18; 18	11; 11
5	(Estonia) (Sweden)	Karoliine Hõim / Kati Tolmoff; Emma Wengberg / Elin Bergblom	22; 20	16; 21	17; 21

==== Germany vs Estonia ====
Germany
5
Echo Arena, Court 3
11 February 2009, 14:00

Estonia
0

			1	2	3
1	(Germany) (Estonia)	Michael Fuchs / Annekatrin Lillie; Ants Mängel / Karoliine Hõim	21; 13	21; 10
2	(Germany) (Estonia)	Dieter Domke; Raul Must	21; 17	21; 19
3	(Germany) (Estonia)	Huaiwen Xu; Kati Tolmoff	21; 11	21; 16
4	(Germany) (Estonia)	Michael Fuchs / Ingo Kindervater; Michal Matejka / Jarolím Vícen	21; 8	21; 6
5	(Germany) (Estonia)	Annekatrin Lillie / Sandra Marinello; Karoliine Hõim / Laura Vana	21; 15	21; 22

==== Slovakia vs Sweden ====
Slovakia
0
Echo Arena, Court 4
11 February 2009, 14:00

Sweden
5

			1	2	3
1	(Slovakia) (Sweden)	Jarolím Vícen / Gabriela Zabavníková; Joel Johansson-Berg / Emma Wengberg	16; 21	13; 21
2	(Slovakia) (Sweden)	Michal Matejka; Kristian Karttunen	14; 21	7; 21
3	(Slovakia) (Sweden)	Zuzana Orlovská; Sophia Hansson	5; 21	8; 21
4	(Slovakia) (Sweden)	Michal Matejka / Jarolím Vícen; Joel Johansson-Berg / Johan Kasperi	13; 21	13; 21
5	(Slovakia) (Sweden)	Zuzana Orlovská / Gabriela Zabavníková; Emma Wengberg / Elin Bergblom	14; 21	7; 21

==== Slovakia vs Estonia ====
Slovakia
1
Echo Arena, Court 4
12 February 2009, 14:00

Estonia
4

			1	2	3
1	(Slovakia) (Estonia)	Michal Matejka / Gabriela Zabavníková; Raul Must / Laura Vana	21; 12	21; 6
2	(Slovakia) (Estonia)	Zuzana Orlovská; Kati Tolmoff	9; 21	7; 21
3	(Slovakia) (Estonia)	Jarolím Vícen; Raul Must	18; 21	13; 21
4	(Slovakia) (Estonia)	Zuzana Orlovská / Gabriela Zabavníková; Karoliine Hõim / Kati Tolmoff	6; 21	18; 21
5	(Slovakia) (Estonia)	Michal Matejka / Jarolím Vícen; Raul Käsner / Ants Mängel	21; 23	16; 21

==== Germany vs Sweden ====
Germany
4
Echo Arena, Court 4
12 February 2009, 18:00

Sweden
1

			1	2	3
1	(Germany) (Sweden)	Johannes Schöttler / Birgit Overzier; Joel Johansson-Berg / Emma Wengberg	21; 13	21; 14
2	(Germany) (Sweden)	Marc Zwiebler; Henri Hurskainen	18; 21	21; 18	21; 15
3	(Germany) (Sweden)	Juliane Schenk; Elin Bergblom	21; 17	21; 12
4	(Germany) (Sweden)	Michael Fuchs / Ingo Kindervater; Joel Johansson-Berg / Johan Kasperi	21; 8	21; 9
5	(Germany) (Sweden)	Sandra Marinello / Birgit Overzier; Emelie Lennartsson / Emma Wengberg	21; 19	16; 21	16; 21

=== Group 4 ===
Pos	Team	Pld	W	L	MF	MA	MD	GF	GA	GD	PF	PA	PD	Pts	Qualification
1	Russia	3	3	0	15	0	+15	30	1	+29	647	288	+359	3	Knockout stage
2	Belarus	3	2	1	10	5	+5	21	10	+11	558	490	+68	2	
3	Latvia	3	1	2	3	12	−9	7	25	−18	410	630	−220	1	
4	Norway	3	0	3	2	13	−11	5	27	−22	421	628	−207	0	

Source: BWF

==== Norway vs Belarus ====
Norway
5
Echo Arena, Court 3
10 February 2009, 18:00

Belarus
0

			1	2	3
1	(Norway) (Belarus)	Jonas Christensen / Mari Helene Bøe; Aleksei Konakh / Vlada Chernyavskaya	16; 21	16; 21
2	(Norway) (Belarus)	Marius Myhre; Yauheni Yakauchuk	12; 21	14; 21
3	(Norway) (Belarus)	Sara Blengsli Kværnø; Alesia Zaitsava	14; 21	17; 21
4	(Norway) (Belarus)	Jonas Christensen / Matz Menkin; Aleksei Konakh / Yauheni Yakauchuk	8; 21	12; 21
5	(Norway) (Belarus)	Mari Helene Bøe / Sara Blengsli Kværnø; Vlada Chernyavskaya / Alesia Zaitsava	11; 21	11; 21

==== Russia vs Latvia ====
Russia
5
Echo Arena, Court 4
10 February 2009, 18:00

Latvia
0

			1	2	3
1	(Russia) (Latvia)	Aleksandr Nikolaenko / Valeria Sorokina; Eduards Loze / Kristīne Šefere	21; 3	21; 7
2	(Russia) (Latvia)	Ivan Sozonov; Raimonds Cipe	21; 10	21; 9
3	(Russia) (Latvia)	Ella Diehl; Kristīne Šefere	21; 3	21; 8
4	(Russia) (Latvia)	Vitalij Durkin / Aleksandr Nikolaenko; Guntis Lavrinovičs / Kārlis Vidass	21; 13	21; 6
5	(Russia) (Latvia)	Valeria Sorokina / Nina Vislova; Zane Mētra / Madara Puķīte	21; 3	21; 8

==== Russia vs Norway ====
Russia
5
Echo Arena, Court 1
11 February 2009, 14:00

Norway
0

			1	2	3
1	(Russia) (Norway)	Vitalij Durkin / Nina Vislova; Matz Menkin / Mari Helene Bøe	21; 6	21; 8
2	(Russia) (Norway)	Vladimir Malkov; Jonas Christensen	21; 7	21; 8
3	(Russia) (Norway)	Ella Diehl; Sara Blengsli Kværnø	21; 10	21; 12
4	(Russia) (Norway)	Vladimir Ivanov / Ivan Sozonov; Jonas Christensen / Matz Menkin	21; 6	21; 14
5	(Russia) (Norway)	Valeria Sorokina / Nina Vislova; Mari Helene Bøe / Ingrid Teistung	21; 10	21; 3

==== Latvia vs Belarus ====
Latvia
0
Echo Arena, Court 2
11 February 2009, 14:00

Belarus
5

			1	2	3
1	(Latvia) (Belarus)	Eduards Loze / Kristīne Šefere; Aleksei Konakh / Vlada Chernyavskaya	20; 22	17; 21
2	(Latvia) (Belarus)	Raimonds Cipe; Yauheni Yakauchuk	17; 21	14; 21
3	(Latvia) (Belarus)	Kristīne Šefere; Alesia Zaitsava	12; 21	12; 21
4	(Latvia) (Belarus)	Guntis Lavrinovičs / Kārlis Vidass; Aleksei Konakh / Yauheni Yakauchuk	22; 24	10; 21
5	(Latvia) (Belarus)	Alesia Hodokovska / Madara Puķīte; Vlada Chernyavskaya / Alesia Zaitsava	5; 21	3; 21

==== Latvia vs Norway ====
Latvia
3
Echo Arena, Court 3
12 February 2009, 10:00

Norway
2

			1	2	3
1	(Latvia) (Norway)	Eduards Loze / Kristīne Šefere; Jonas Christensen / Mari Helene Bøe	21; 14	18; 21	21; 9
2	(Latvia) (Norway)	Raimonds Cipe; Marius Myhre	21; 17	21; 19
3	(Latvia) (Norway)	Madara Puķīte; Sara Blengsli Kværnø	7; 21	9; 21
4	(Latvia) (Norway)	Guntis Lavrinovičs / Kārlis Vidass; Jonas Christensen / Matz Menkin	21; 18	21; 14
5	(Latvia) (Norway)	Kristīne Šefere / Madara Puķīte; Mari Helene Bøe / Sara Blengsli Kværnø	10; 21	21; 10	17; 21

==== Russia vs Belarus ====
Russia
5
Echo Arena, Court 6
12 February 2009, 10:00

Belarus
0

			1	2	3
1	(Russia) (Belarus)	Ivan Sozonov / Ekaterina Ananina; Aleksei Konakh / Vlada Chernyavskaya	17; 21	21; 10	21; 15
2	(Russia) (Belarus)	Vladimir Ivanov; Yauheni Yakauchuk	21; 15	21; 19
3	(Russia) (Belarus)	Ella Diehl; Alesia Zaitsava	21; 11	21; 16
4	(Russia) (Belarus)	Alexander Nikolaenko / Vitalij Durkin; Aleksei Konakh / Yauheni Yakauchuk	21; 5	21; 7
5	(Russia) (Belarus)	Valeria Sorokina / Nina Vislova; Vlada Chernyavskaya / Alesia Zaitsava	21; 6	21; 9

=== Group 5 ===
Pos	Team	Pld	W	L	MF	MA	MD	GF	GA	GD	PF	PA	PD	Pts	Qualification
1	Netherlands	3	3	0	14	1	+13	29	4	+25	686	436	+250	3	Knockout stage
2	Belgium	3	2	1	9	6	+3	20	12	+8	607	537	+70	2	
3	Austria	3	1	2	5	10	−5	10	21	−11	514	589	−75	1	
4	Israel	3	0	3	2	13	−11	5	27	−22	406	651	−245	0	

Source: BWF

==== Netherlands vs Austria ====
Netherlands
5
Echo Arena, Court 3
10 February 2009, 14:00

Austria
0

			1	2	3
1	(Netherlands) (Austria)	Jorrit de Ruiter / Ilse Vaessen; Roman Zirnwald / Elisabeth Baldauf	21; 11	21; 17
2	(Netherlands) (Austria)	Eric Pang; David Obernosterer	21; 12	21; 16
3	(Netherlands) (Austria)	Judith Meulendijks; Miriam Gruber	21; 6	21; 8
4	(Netherlands) (Austria)	Koen Ridder / Jurgen Wouters; Michael Lahnsteiner / Peter Zauner	21; 17	28; 26
5	(Netherlands) (Austria)	Yao Jie / Paulien van Dooremalen; Belinda Heber / Elisabeth Baldauf	21; 12	21; 9

==== Israel vs Belgium ====
Israel
0
Echo Arena, Court 4
10 February 2009, 14:00

Belgium
5

			1	2	3
1	(Israel) (Belgium)	Misha Zilberman; Yuhan Tan	13; 21	11; 21
2	(Israel) (Belgium)	Alina Pugach; Lianne Tan	14; 21	15; 21
3	(Israel) (Belgium)	Shai Geffen / Ilia Konyak; Wouter Claes / Frédéric Mawet	6; 21	12; 21
4	(Israel) (Belgium)	Mor Bitterman / Alina Pugach; Steffi Annys / Séverine Corvilain	15; 21	12; 21
5	(Israel) (Belgium)	Misha Zilberman / Svetlana Zilberman; Wouter Claes / Nathalie Descamps	12; 21	19; 21

==== Austria vs Belgium ====
Austria
1
Echo Arena, Court 5
11 February 2009, 18:00

Belgium
4

			1	2	3
1	(Austria) (Belgium)	Roman Zirnwald / Elisabeth Baldauf; Wouter Claes / Nathalie Descamps	12; 21	15; 21
2	(Austria) (Belgium)	Michael Lahnsteiner; Yuhan Tan	18; 21	14; 21
3	(Austria) (Belgium)	Claudia Mayer; Nathalie Descamps	19; 21	10; 21
4	(Austria) (Belgium)	Michael Lahnsteiner / Peter Zauner; Wouter Claes / Frédéric Mawet	25; 23	22; 20
5	(Austria) (Belgium)	Elisabeth Baldauf / Belinda Heber; Steffi Annys / Séverine Corvilain	14; 21	14; 21

==== Netherlands vs Israel ====
Netherlands
4
Echo Arena, Court 3
10 February 2009, 14:00

Israel
1

			1	2	3
1	(Netherlands) (Israel)	Dicky Palyama; Shai Geffen	21; 12	21; 13
2	(Netherlands) (Israel)	Patty Stolzenbach; Mor Bitterman	21; 3	21; 1
3	(Netherlands) (Israel)	Koen Ridder / Jurgen Wouters; Ilia Konyak / Anton Kracheny	21; 17	28; 26
4	(Netherlands) (Israel)	Yao Jie / Paulien van Dooremalen; Mor Bitterman / Alina Pugach	21; 8	21; 10
5	(Netherlands) (Israel)	Jorrit de Ruiter / Ilse Vaessen; Misha Zilberman / Svetlana Zilberman	21; 11	16; 21	19; 21

==== Netherlands vs Belgium ====
Netherlands
4
Echo Arena, Court 1
12 February 2009, 14:00

Belgium
1

			1	2	3
1	(Netherlands) (Belgium)	Dicky Palyama; Yuhan Tan	21; 19	21; 19
2	(Netherlands) (Belgium)	Yao Jie; Lianne Tan	16; 21	21; 18	21; 10
3	(Netherlands) (Belgium)	Ruud Bosch / Koen Ridder; Wouter Claes / Frédéric Mawet	21; 15	21; 15
4	(Netherlands) (Belgium)	Judith Meulendijks / Paulien van Dooremalen; Steffi Annys / Séverine Corvilain	21; 10	21; 12
5	(Netherlands) (Belgium)	Jorrit de Ruiter / Ilse Vaessen; Wouter Claes / Nathalie Descamps	21; 13	19; 21	21; 13

==== Austria vs Israel ====
Austria
4
Echo Arena, Court 2
12 February 2009, 14:00

Israel
1

			1	2	3
1	(Austria) (Israel)	Claudia Mayer; Alina Pugach	21; 12	21; 5
2	(Austria) (Israel)	Michael Lahnsteiner; Misha Zilberman	24; 22	14; 21	21; 11
3	(Austria) (Israel)	Elisabeth Baldauf / Belinda Heber; Alina Pugach / Svetlana Zilberman	21; 12	21; 16
4	(Austria) (Israel)	Michael Lahnsteiner / Peter Zauner; Ilia Konyak / Anton Kracheny	21; 10	21; 10
5	(Austria) (Israel)	Roman Zirnwald / Elisabeth Baldauf; Misha Zilberman / Svetlana Zilberman	17; 21	15; 21

=== Group 6 ===
Pos	Team	Pld	W	L	MF	MA	MD	GF	GA	GD	PF	PA	PD	Pts	Qualification
1	Poland	3	3	0	12	3	+9	24	6	+18	606	443	+163	3	Knockout stage
2	Bulgaria	3	2	1	9	6	+3	18	13	+5	584	494	+90	2	
3	Finland	3	1	2	7	8	−1	14	17	−3	505	580	−75	1	
4	Lithuania	3	0	3	2	13	−11	6	26	−20	462	640	−178	0	

Source: BWF

==== Poland vs Lithuania ====
Poland
4
Echo Arena, Court 1
10 February 2009, 14:00

Lithuania
1

			1	2	3
1	(Poland) (Lithuania)	Przemysław Wacha; Kęstutis Navickas	21; 18	21; 14
2	(Poland) (Lithuania)	Anna Narel; Akvilė Stapušaitytė	19; 21	18; 21
3	(Poland) (Lithuania)	Michał Łogosz / Wojciech Szkudlarczyk; Klaudijus Kašinskis / Kęstutis Navickas	21; 8	21; 13
4	(Poland) (Lithuania)	Małgorzata Kurdelska / Agnieszka Wojtkowska; Akvilė Stapušaitytė / Ligita Žukauskaitė	21; 11	21; 11
5	(Poland) (Lithuania)	Robert Mateusiak / Kamila Augustyn; Ramūnas Stapušaitis / Kristina Dovydaitytė	21; 7	21; 11

==== Finland vs Bulgaria ====
Finland
1
Echo Arena, Court 2
10 February 2009, 14:00

Bulgaria
4

			1	2	3
1	(Finland) (Bulgaria)	Tuomas Nuorteva / Sanni Rautala; Stiliyan Makarski / Diana Dimova	13; 21	18; 21
2	(Finland) (Bulgaria)	Ville Lång; Blagovest Kisyov	22; 20	21; 18
3	(Finland) (Bulgaria)	Anu Nieminen; Petya Nedelcheva	11; 21	9; 21
4	(Finland) (Bulgaria)	Tuomas Nuorteva / Mikko Vikman; Krasimir Jankov / Vladimir Metodiev	13; 21	7; 21
5	(Finland) (Bulgaria)	Sanni Rautala / Noora Virta; Petya Nedelcheva / Dimitria Popstoikova	13; 21	13; 21

==== Lithuania vs Bulgaria ====
Lithuania
1
Echo Arena, Court 3
11 February 2009, 10:00

Bulgaria
4

			1	2	3
1	(Lithuania) (Bulgaria)	Kęstutis Navickas; Blagovest Kisyov	21; 10	21; 10
2	(Lithuania) (Bulgaria)	Akvilė Stapušaitytė; Petya Nedelcheva	11; 21	8; 21
3	(Lithuania) (Bulgaria)	Klaudijus Kašinskis / Kęstutis Navickas; Julian Hristov / Krasimir Jankov	11; 21	14; 21
4	(Lithuania) (Bulgaria)	Kristina Dovydaitytė / Akvilė Stapušaitytė; Petya Nedelcheva / Dimitria Popstoikova	22; 20	12; 21	12; 21
5	(Lithuania) (Bulgaria)	Ramūnas Stapušaitis / Ligita Žukauskaitė; Stiliyan Makarski / Diana Dimova	12; 21	17; 21

==== Poland vs Finland ====
Poland
4
Echo Arena, Court 4
11 February 2009, 10:00

Finland
1

			1	2	3
1	(Poland) (Finland)	Robert Mateusiak / Kamila Augustyn; Tuomas Nuorteva / Noora Virta	21; 18	21; 6
2	(Poland) (Finland)	Przemysław Wacha; Ville Lång	21; 7	25; 23
3	(Poland) (Finland)	Natalia Pocztowiak; Anu Nieminen	17; 21	19; 21
4	(Poland) (Finland)	Michał Łogosz / Robert Mateusiak; Tuomas Nuorteva / Mikko Vikman	21; 10	21; 9
5	(Poland) (Finland)	Kamila Augustyn / Małgorzata Kurdelska; Sanni Rautala / Noora Virta	21; 11	21; 12

==== Lithuania vs Finland ====
Lithuania
0
Echo Arena, Court 3
12 February 2009, 14:00

Finland
5

			1	2	3
1	(Lithuania) (Finland)	Akvilė Stapušaitytė; Anu Nieminen	9; 21	15; 21
2	(Lithuania) (Finland)	Kęstutis Navickas; Ville Lång	19; 21	21; 14	19; 21
3	(Lithuania) (Finland)	Kristina Dovydaitytė / Akvilė Stapušaitytė; Sanni Rautala / Noora Virta	10; 21	11; 21
4	(Lithuania) (Finland)	Kęstutis Navickas / Ramūnas Stapušaitis; Ville Lång / Mikko Vikman	12; 21	21; 23
5	(Lithuania) (Finland)	Klaudijus Kašinskis / Ligita Žukauskaitė; Tuomas Nuorteva / Noora Virta	20; 22	9; 21

==== Poland vs Bulgaria ====
Poland
4
Echo Arena, Court 3
12 February 2009, 18:00

Bulgaria
1

			1	2	3
1	(Poland) (Bulgaria)	Robert Mateusiak / Kamila Augustyn; Stiliyan Makarski / Petya Nedelcheva	21; 11	21; 18
2	(Poland) (Bulgaria)	Przemysław Wacha; Blagovest Kisyov	21; 16	21; 17
3	(Poland) (Bulgaria)	Anna Narel; Linda Zetchiri	11; 21	14; 21
4	(Poland) (Bulgaria)	Michał Łogosz / Robert Mateusiak; Julian Hristov / Krasimir Jankov	21; 16	21; 13
5	(Poland) (Bulgaria)	Kamila Augustyn / Małgorzata Kurdelska; Petya Nedelcheva / Diana Dimova	21; 19	21; 18

=== Group 7 ===
Pos	Team	Pld	W	L	MF	MA	MD	GF	GA	GD	PF	PA	PD	Pts	Qualification
1	Ukraine	3	3	0	14	1	+13	29	2	+27	646	423	+223	3	Knockout stage
2	Iceland	3	2	1	7	8	−1	16	17	−1	564	586	−22	2	
3	Italy	3	1	2	6	9	−3	12	18	−6	503	551	−48	1	
4	Hungary	3	0	3	3	12	−9	6	26	−20	485	638	−153	0	

Source: BWF

==== Ukraine vs Italy ====
Ukraine
5
Echo Arena, Court 5
10 February 2009, 18:00

Italy
0

			1	2	3
1	(Ukraine) (Italy)	Dmytro Zavadsky / Mariya Diptan; Giovanni Traina / Federica Panini	21; 11	21; 10
2	(Ukraine) (Italy)	Valeriy Atrashchenkov; Rosario Maddaloni	21; 11	21; 18
3	(Ukraine) (Italy)	Larisa Griga; Agnese Allegrini	21; 11	21; 12
4	(Ukraine) (Italy)	Vladislav Druzchenko / Vitaly Konov; Giovanni Greco / Pierluigi Musiari	21; 19	21; 14
5	(Ukraine) (Italy)	Anna Kobceva / Elena Prus; Elena Chepurnova / Federica Panini	21; 12	21; 16

==== Hungary vs Iceland ====
Hungary
2
Echo Arena, Court 6
10 February 2009, 18:00

Iceland
3

			1	2	3
1	(Hungary) (Iceland)	Henrik Tóth; Magnús Ingi Helgason	20; 22	21; 19	21; 7
2	(Hungary) (Iceland)	Orsolya Varga; Tinna Helgadóttir	13; 11	14; 12
3	(Hungary) (Iceland)	András Németh / Dávid Sárosi; Magnús Ingi Helgason / Helgi Jóhannesson	21; 19	21; 14
4	(Hungary) (Iceland)	Orsolya Varga / Sarolta Varga; Snjólaug Jóhannsdóttir / Karitas Ósk Ólafsdóttir	21; 10	13; 21	21; 16
5	(Hungary) (Iceland)	Henrik Tóth / Krisztina Ádám; Helgi Jóhannesson / Tinna Helgadóttir	15; 21	13; 21

==== Italy vs Iceland ====
Italy
2
Echo Arena, Court 5
11 February 2009, 14:00

Iceland
3

			1	2	3
1	(Italy) (Iceland)	Rosario Maddaloni / Federica Panini; Helgi Jóhannesson / Tinna Helgadóttir	7; 21	15; 21
2	(Italy) (Iceland)	Giovanni Greco; Magnús Ingi Helgason	16; 21	16; 21
3	(Italy) (Iceland)	Agnese Allegrini; Tinna Helgadóttir	21; 18	21; 18
4	(Italy) (Iceland)	Pierluigi Musiari / Giovanni Traina; Magnús Ingi Helgason / Helgi Jóhannesson	12; 21	12; 21
5	(Italy) (Iceland)	Agnese Allegrini / Federica Panini; Snjólaug Jóhannsdóttir / Karitas Ósk Ólafsdóttir	21; 14	21; 9

==== Ukraine vs Hungary ====
Ukraine
5
Echo Arena, Court 6
11 February 2009, 14:00

Hungary
0

			1	2	3
1	(Ukraine) (Hungary)	Vitaly Konov; Henrik Tóth	21; 16	21; 18
2	(Ukraine) (Hungary)	Elena Prus; Sarolta Varga	21; 15	21; 14
3	(Ukraine) (Hungary)	Valeriy Atrashchenkov / Dmytro Zavadsky; András Németh / Dávid Sárosi	21; 10	21; 14
4	(Ukraine) (Hungary)	Mariya Diptan / Anna Kobceva; Orsolya Varga / Sarolta Varga	21; 9	21; 8
5	(Ukraine) (Hungary)	Vladislav Druzchenko / Larisa Griga; Henrik Tóth / Krisztina Ádám	21; 14	21; 13

==== Italy vs Hungary ====
Italy
4
Echo Arena, Court 1
12 February 2009, 10:00

Hungary
1

			1	2	3
1	(Italy) (Hungary)	Agnese Allegrini; Sarolta Varga	21; 8	21; 9
2	(Italy) (Hungary)	Rosario Maddaloni; Henrik Tóth	17; 21	19; 21
3	(Italy) (Hungary)	Agnese Allegrini / Federica Panini; Krisztina Ádám / Sarolta Varga	21; 19	21; 13
4	(Italy) (Hungary)	Pierluigi Musiari / Giovanni Greco; András Németh / Dávid Sárosi	21; 13	21; 15
5	(Italy) (Hungary)	Giovanni Traina / Federica Panini; Henrik Tóth / Krisztina Ádám	24; 22	21; 15

==== Ukraine vs Iceland ====
Ukraine
5
Echo Arena, Court 2
12 February 2009, 10:00

Iceland
0

			1	2	3
1	(Ukraine) (Iceland)	Dmytro Zavadsky; Atli Jóhannsson	21; 3	21; 11
2	(Ukraine) (Iceland)	Mariya Diptan; Tinna Helgadóttir	24; 22	21; 11
3	(Ukraine) (Iceland)	Vitaly Konov / Dmytro Zavadsky; Magnús Ingi Helgason / Helgi Jóhannesson	21; 16	21; 12
4	(Ukraine) (Iceland)	Larisa Griga / Elena Prus; Snjólaug Jóhannsdóttir / Karitas Ósk Ólafsdóttir	21; 13	21; 14
5	(Ukraine) (Iceland)	Vladislav Druzchenko / Anna Kobceva; Helgi Jóhannesson / Tinna Helgadóttir	18; 21	21; 14	16; 21

=== Group 8 ===
Pos	Team	Pld	W	L	MF	MA	MD	GF	GA	GD	PF	PA	PD	Pts	Qualification
1	England	3	3	0	14	1	+13	29	4	+25	679	454	+225	3	Knockout stage
2	Scotland	3	2	1	9	6	+3	20	13	+7	621	565	+56	2	
3	Czech Republic	3	1	2	4	11	−7	10	23	−13	537	630	−93	1	
4	Wales	3	0	3	3	12	−9	6	25	−19	438	626	−188	0	

Source: BWF

==== Wales vs Scotland ====
Wales
1
Echo Arena, Court 1
10 February 2009, 18:00

Scotland
4

			1	2	3
1	(Wales) (Scotland)	Martyn Lewis / Caroline Harvey; Watson Briggs / Imogen Bankier	9; 21	23; 25
2	(Wales) (Scotland)	Irwansyah; Kieran Merrilees	21; 19	21; 19
3	(Wales) (Scotland)	Caroline Harvey; Susan Hughes	10; 21	5; 21
4	(Wales) (Scotland)	Matthew Hughes / Martyn Lewis; Andrew Bowman / Watson Briggs	18; 21	19; 21
5	(Wales) (Scotland)	Harriet Johnson / Kerry Ann Sheppard; Imogen Bankier / Jillie Cooper	11; 21	10; 21

==== England vs Czech Republic ====
England
5
Echo Arena, Court 2
10 February 2009, 18:00

Czech Republic
0

			1	2	3
1	(England) (Czech Republic)	Anthony Clark / Donna Kellogg; Pavel Florián / Martina Benešová	21; 9	21; 8
2	(England) (Czech Republic)	Rajiv Ouseph; Petr Koukal	21; 17	21; 10
3	(England) (Czech Republic)	Elizabeth Cann; Kristína Ludíková	21; 17	21; 19
4	(England) (Czech Republic)	Chris Adcock / Robert Blair; Pavel Florián / Jan Vondra	21; 13	21; 8
5	(England) (Czech Republic)	Jenny Wallwork / Gabby White; Martina Benešová / Kristína Ludíková	21; 18	18; 21	21; 14

==== Czech Republic vs Scotland ====
Czech Republic
1
Echo Arena, Court 1
11 February 2009, 18:00

Scotland
4

			1	2	3
1	(Czech Republic) (Scotland)	Petr Koukal / Martina Benešová; Watson Briggs / Imogen Bankier	10; 21	21; 24
2	(Czech Republic) (Scotland)	Jan Vondra; Kieran Merrilees	15; 21	21; 13	21; 16
3	(Czech Republic) (Scotland)	Kristína Ludíková; Susan Hughes	16; 21	12; 21
4	(Czech Republic) (Scotland)	Pavel Florián / Jan Vondra; Andrew Bowman / Watson Briggs	10; 21	20; 22
5	(Czech Republic) (Scotland)	Martina Benešová / Kristína Ludíková; Imogen Bankier / Jillie Cooper	14; 21	16; 21

==== England vs Wales ====
England
5
Echo Arena, Court 2
11 February 2009, 18:00

Wales
0

			1	2	3
1	(England) (Wales)	Andrew Smith; Irwansyah	21; 8	21; 10
2	(England) (Wales)	Helen Davies; Harriet Johnson	21; 13	21; 17
3	(England) (Wales)	Anthony Clark / Nathan Robertson; Matthew Hughes / Martyn Lewis	21; 12	21; 5
4	(England) (Wales)	Mariana Agathangelou / Jenny Wallwork; Caroline Harvey / Carissa Turner	21; 12	21; 16
5	(England) (Wales)	Chris Adcock / Gabby White; Jonathan Morgan / Kerry Ann Sheppard	21; 5	21; 13

==== Czech Republic vs Wales ====
Czech Republic
3
Echo Arena, Court 1
12 February 2009, 18:00

Wales
2

			1	2	3
1	(Czech Republic) (Wales)	Jan Vondra / Hana Procházková; Martyn Lewis / Caroline Harvey	21; 15	10; 21	23; 25
2	(Czech Republic) (Wales)	Petr Koukal; Irwansyah	21; 18	21; 14
3	(Czech Republic) (Wales)	Kristína Ludíková; Harriet Johnson	21; 14	21; 9
4	(Czech Republic) (Wales)	Pavel Florián / Jan Vondra; Matthew Hughes / Martyn Lewis	11; 21	15; 21
5	(Czech Republic) (Wales)	Martina Benešová / Kristína Ludíková; Caroline Harvey / Carissa Turner	21; 8	21; 14

==== England vs Scotland ====
England
4
Echo Arena, Court 2
12 February 2009, 18:00

Scotland
1

			1	2	3
1	(England) (Scotland)	Robert Blair / Gabby White; Watson Briggs / Imogen Bankier	22; 20	21; 11
2	(England) (Scotland)	Rajiv Ouseph; Kieran Merrilees	21; 13	21; 18
3	(England) (Scotland)	Elizabeth Cann; Susan Hughes	12; 21	21; 15	17; 21
4	(England) (Scotland)	Anthony Clark / Nathan Robertson; Andrew Bowman / Watson Briggs	21; 13	22; 24	21; 7
5	(England) (Scotland)	Donna Kellogg / Jenny Wallwork; Imogen Bankier / Jillie Cooper	21; 13	21; 13

== Knockout stage ==
Quarterfinals
13 February
Denmark	3
France	1
13 February
Germany	2
Russia	3
13 February
Netherlands	1
Poland	3
13 February
Ukraine	1
England	3

Semifinals
14 February
Denmark	3
Russia	0
14 February
Poland	2
England	3

Final
15 February
Denmark	3
England	2

=== Quarterfinals ===
Denmark
3
Echo Arena, Court 3
13 February 2009

France
1

			1	2	3
1	(Denmark) (France)	Jan Ø. Jørgensen; Brice Leverdez	21; 13	21; 14
2	(Denmark) (France)	Nanna Brosolat Jensen; Pi Hongyan	9; 21	9; 21
3	(Denmark) (France)	Mathias Boe / Carsten Mogensen; Baptiste Careme / Ronan Labar	21; 16	21; 11
4	(Denmark) (France)	Marie Røpke / Tine Rasmussen; Laura Choinet / Weny Rahmawati	21; 12	21; 13
5	(Denmark) (France)	Joachim Fischer Nielsen / Christinna Pedersen; Sylvian Grosjean / Barbara Matias				not played

Germany
2
Echo Arena, Court 4
13 February 2009

Russia
3

			1	2	3
1	(Germany) (Russia)	Johannes Schöttler / Birgit Overzier; Alexander Nikolaenko / Valeria Sorokina	11; 21	13; 21
2	(Germany) (Russia)	Marc Zwiebler; Vladimir Malkov	21; 9	21; 13
3	(Germany) (Russia)	Juliane Schenk; Ella Diehl	21; 14	21; 19
4	(Germany) (Russia)	Michael Fuchs / Ingo Kindervater; Alexander Nikolaenko / Vitaly Durkin	17; 21	19; 21
5	(Germany) (Russia)	Xu Huaiwen / Birgit Overzier; Valeria Sorokina / Nina Vislova	10; 21	8; 21

Netherlands
1
Echo Arena, Court 2
13 February 2009

Poland
3

			1	2	3
1	(Netherlands) (Poland)	Jorrit de Ruiter / Ilse Vaesen; Robert Mateusiak / Kamila Augustyn	14; 21	9; 21
2	(Netherlands) (Poland)	Eric Pang; Przemyslaw Wacha	15; 21	21; 10	13; 21
3	(Netherlands) (Poland)	Judith Meulendijks; Natalia Pocztowiak	21; 9	21; 12
4	(Netherlands) (Poland)	Ruud Bosch / Koen Ridder; Michal Logosz / Robert Mateusiak	15; 21	12; 21
5	(Netherlands) (Poland)	Yao Jie / Judith Meulendijks; Kamila Augustyn / Malgorzata Kurdelska				not played

Ukraine
1
Echo Arena, Court 1
13 February 2009

England
3

			1	2	3
1	(Ukraine) (England)	Valeriy Atrashchenkov / Elena Prus; Nathan Robertson / Jenny Wallwork	9; 21	14; 21
2	(Ukraine) (England)	Dmytro Zavadsky; Andrew Smith	21; 17	15; 21	18; 21
3	(Ukraine) (England)	Larisa Griga; Elizabeth Cann	21; 15	21; 19
4	(Ukraine) (England)	Valeriy Atrashchenkov / Vladislav Druzchenko; Chris Adcock / Robert Blair	14; 21	12; 21
5	(Ukraine) (England)	Anna Kobceva / Elena Prus; Donna Kellogg / Gabrielle White				not played

=== Semifinals ===
Denmark
3
Echo Arena, Court 1
14 February 2009

Russia
0

			1	2	3
1	(Denmark) (Russia)	Thomas Laybourn / Kamilla Rytter Juhl; Vitaly Durkin / Nina Vislova	21; 13	21; 16
2	(Denmark) (Russia)	Joachim Persson; Ivan Sozonov	21; 14	21; 12
3	(Denmark) (Russia)	Tine Rasmussen; Ella Diehl	21; 18	21; 7
4	(Denmark) (Russia)	Mathias Boe / Carsten Mogensen; Alexander Nikolaenko / Vitaly Durkin				not played
5	(Denmark) (Russia)	Marie Røpke / Kamilla Rytter Juhl; Valeria Sorokina / Nina Vislova				not played

Poland
2
Echo Arena, Court 1
14 February 2009

England
3

			1	2	3
1	(Poland) (England)	Michal Logosz / Natalia Pocztowiak; Anthony Clark / Donna Kellogg	15; 21	9; 21
2	(Poland) (England)	Przemyslaw Wacha; Andrew Smith	21; 17	22; 20
3	(Poland) (England)	Kamila Augustyn; Elizabeth Cann	21; 11	4; 21	9; 21
4	(Poland) (England)	Michal Logosz / Robert Mateusiak; Anthony Clark / Nathan Robertson	21; 18	21; 12
5	(Poland) (England)	Kamila Augustyn / Malgorzata Kurdelska; Donna Kellogg / Jenny Wallwork	12; 21	21; 17	12; 21

=== Final ===
Denmark
3
Echo Arena, Court 1
15 February 2009

England
2

			1	2	3
1	(Denmark) (England)	Joachim Fischer Nielsen / Christinna Pedersen; Anthony Clark / Donna Kellogg	10; 21	21; 23
2	(Denmark) (England)	Joachim Persson; Andrew Smith	16; 21	19; 21
3	(Denmark) (England)	Tine Rasmussen; Elizabeth Cann	21; 14	21; 10
4	(Denmark) (England)	Mathias Boe / Carsten Mogensen; Anthony Clark / Nathan Robertson	21; 17	16; 21	21; 15
5	(Denmark) (England)	Marie Røpke / Kamilla Rytter Juhl; Donna Kellogg / Jenny Wallwork	21; 14	21; 15
