= Belarusian National Badminton Championships =

The Belarusian National Badminton Championships is a tournament organized to crown the best badminton players in Belarus. They are held since the season 1992. There is not any international tournament in Belarus.

== Past winners ==
Year	Men's singles	Women's singles	Men's doubles	Women's doubles	Mixed doubles
1992	Michail Korshuk	Svetlana Heykova	Michail Korshuk; Oleg Morozevitch	Vlada Tcherniavskaia; Tatiana Gerasimovitch	Vitalii Shmakov; Tatiana Gerasimovitch
1993	Vitalii Shmakov	Vlada Tcherniavskaia	Michail Korshuk; Oleg Morozevitch	Vlada Tcherniavskaia; Tatiana Gerasimovitch	Oleg Morozevitch; Svetlana Koparkina
1994	Michail Korshuk	Vlada Tcherniavskaia	Michail Korshuk; Vitalii Shmakov	Vlada Tcherniavskaia; Tatiana Gerasimovitch	Vitalii Shmakov; Vlada Tcherniavskaia
1995	Michail Korshuk	Vlada Tcherniavskaia	Michail Korshuk; Vitalii Shmakov	Vlada Tcherniavskaia; Tatiana Gerasimovitch	Vitalii Shmakov; Vlada Tcherniavskaia
1996	Michail Korshuk	Vlada Tcherniavskaia	Michail Korshuk; Vitalii Shmakov	Vlada Tcherniavskaia; Tatiana Gerasimovitch	Vitalii Shmakov; Vlada Tcherniavskaia
1997	Vyacheslav Roudnitski	Vlada Tcherniavskaia	Vyacheslav Roudnitski; Vitalii Shmakov	Vlada Tcherniavskaia; Tatiana Gerasimovitch	Michail Korshuk; Tatiana Gerasimovitch
1998	Vitalii Shmakov	Vlada Tcherniavskaia	Vyacheslav Roudnitski; Vitalii Shmakov	Vlada Tcherniavskaia; Tatiana Gerasimovitch	Michail Korshuk; Tatiana Gerasimovitch
1999	Vyacheslav Roudnitski	Vlada Tcherniavskaia	Vyacheslav Roudnitski; Vitalii Shmakov	Vlada Tcherniavskaia; Tatiana Gerasimovitch	Michail Korshuk; Tatiana Gerasimovitch
2000	Vyacheslav Roudnitski	Nadieżda Kostiuczyk	Vyacheslav Roudnitski; Vitalii Shmakov	Olga Boyarovskaia; Nadieżda Kostiuczyk	Andrei Konakh; Nadieżda Kostiuczyk
2001	Andrei Malutin	Nadieżda Kostiuczyk	Andrei Malutin; Vitalii Shmakov	Olga Boyarovskaia; Nadieżda Kostiuczyk	Vitalii Shmakov; Vlada Tcherniavskaia
2002	Andrei Malutin	Nadieżda Kostiuczyk	Vitali Shmakov; Andrei Malutin	Olga Boyarovskaia; Nadieżda Kostiuczyk	Vitali Shmakov; Vlada Tcherniavskaia
2003	Andrei Malutin	Vlada Tcherniavskaya	Alexei Denisenko; Evgenij Jakovchuk	Vlada Tcherniavskaia; Matia Kizil	Vitali Shmakov; Vlada Tcherniavskaia
2004	Andrei Malutin	Vlada Tcherniavskaya	Andrei Konakh; Oleg Gutarev	Vlada Tcherniavskaia; Maria Kizil	Andrei Konakh; Olga Konon
2005	Andrei Malutin	Vlada Tcherniavskaya	Andrei Malutin; Yury Sakolin	Vlada Tcherniavskaia; Maria Kizil	Andrei Malutin; Vlada Tcherniavskaia
2006	Andrei Malutin	Alesia Zaitsava	Andrei Malutin; Yury Sakolin	Alesia Zaitsava; Sviatlana Petrova	Andrei Konakh; Olga Konon
2007	Yauheni Yakauchuk	Alesia Zaitsava	Yauheni Yakauchuk; Yury Sakolin	Vlada Tcherniavskaia; Maria Kizil	Yury Sakolin; Vlada Tcherniavskaia
2008	Yauheni Yakauchuk	Olga Konon	Andrei Konakh; Aliaksei Konakh	Alesia Zaitsava; Olga Konon	Andrei Konakh; Alesia Zaitsava
2009	Yauheni Yakauchuk	Alesia Zaitsava	Andrei Konakh; Aliaksei Konakh	Alesia Zaitsava; Elena Lukashevich	Aliaksei Konakh; Alesia Zaitsava
2010	Yauheni Yakauchuk	Alesia Zaitsava	Aliaksei Konakh; Igor Birykov	Alesia Zaitsava; Elena Lukashevich	Aliaksei Konakh; Alesia Zaitsava
2011	Yauheni Yakauchuk	Alesia Zaitsava	Aliaksei Konakh; Pavel Voloshin	Alesia Zaitsava; Elena Lukashevich	Aliaksei Konakh; Alesia Zaitsava
2012	Yauheni Yakauchuk	Alesia Zaitsava	Aliaksei Konakh; Pavel Voloshin	Alesia Zaitsava	Aliaksei Konakh; Alesia Zaitsava
2013	Yauheni Yakauchuk	Alesia Zaitsava	Yauheni Yakauchuk; Sakolin Yury	Vlada Tcherniavskaia; Anastasiya Tcherniavskaia	Yauheni Yakauchuk; Vlada Tcherniavskaia
2014	Yauheni Yakauchuk	Alesia Zaitsava	Yauheni Yakauchuk; Sakolin Yury	Alesia Zaitsava; Elena Lukashevich	Yauheni Yakauchuk; Vlada Tcherniavskaia
2015	Yauheni Yakauchuk	Alesia Zaitsava	Yauheni Yakauchuk; Sakolin Yury	Alesia Zaitsava; Elena Lukashevich	Aliaksei Konakh; Anastasiya Tcherniavskaia
2016	Dmitriy Supruniuk	Alesia Zaitsava	Vitaliy Primak; Dmitry Saydakov	Kristina Silich; Anastasiya Tcherniavskaia	Aliaksei Konakh; Anastasiya Tcherniavskaia
2017					
2018	Yauheni Yakauchuk	Alesia Zaitsava	Dmitri Kyzmitski; Ilya Laryushin	Alesia Zaitsava; Anastasiya Tcherniavskaia	Aliaksei Konakh; Alesia Zaitsava
2019	Yauheni Yakauchuk	Maryana Viarbitskaya	Dmitry Saydakov; Yauheni Yakauchuk	Julia Bitsoukova; Maryana Viarbitskaya	Aliaksei Konakh; Krestina Silich

=== Junior champions ===
Year	Men's singles	Women's singles	Men's doubles	Women's doubles	Mixed doubles
1992	Oleg Evgrafov	Natalia Kalujnaia	Oleg Evgrafov / Vitalii Masuk	Svetlana Kapelian / Valentina Metlitzkaia	Oleg Evstafiev / Svetlana Kapelian
1993	Andrey Maluotin	Irina Gourina	Andrey Maluotin / Maksim Makarenko	Olesia Dikan / Maria Kizil	Andrey Maloutin / Olesia Dikan
1994	Andrey Astafiev	Irina Gourina	Andrey Astafiev / Valentin Mischenko	Irina Gourina / Dina Greenshtein	Vitalii Zinchuk / Irina Gourina
1995	Andrey Maluotin	Irina Gourina	Vitalii Zenchuk / Alexandr Borodavkin	Irina Gourina / Dina Greenshtein	Andrey Maloutin / Maria Kizil
1996	Maksim Makarenko	Irina Gourina	Andrey Konah / Dmitrii Autarev	Irina Gourina / Nadejhda Kostuochik	Andrey Maloutin / Maria Kizil
1997	Andrey Maluotin	Maria Kizil	Andrey Maloutin / Jori Sakolin	Irina Gourina / Nadieżda Kostiuczyk	Andrey Maloutin / Maria Kizil
1998	Maksim Makarenko	Nadieżda Kostiuczyk	Andrey Konakh / Dmitrii Butarev	Nadieżda Kostiuczyk / Anna Grankina	Andrey Konah / Nadieżda Kostiuczyk
1999	Andrei Razmakov	Nadieżda Kostiuczyk	Andrei Razmakov / Maxim Schmakov	Nadieżda Kostiuczyk / Anna Grankina	Maxim Konach / Nadieżda Kostiuczyk
2000	Oleg Paschkovich	Anna Grankina	Andrei Razmakov / Maxim Schmakov	Olga Kostuchik / Anna Grankina	Oleg Paschkovich / Anna Grankina
2001	Andrei Vaganov	Olesja Zaiceva	Oleg Paschkovich / Evgenij Jakovchuk	Olesja Zaiceva / Olga Konon	Oleg Paschkovich / Olesja Zaiceva
2002	Evgenij Jakovchuk	Olesja Zaiceva	Evgenij Jakovchuk / Aleksei Konakh	Olga Konon / Olesja Zaiceva	Evgenij Jakovchuk / Olga Konon
2003	Evgenij Jakovchuk	Anna Miroshnik	Evgenij Jakovchuk / Aleksei Konakh	Anna Miroshnik / Elena Havriliuk	Evgenij Jakovchuk / Elena Havriliuk
2004	Aleksandr Manko	Svetlana Petrova	Aleksei Konakh / Aleksandr Manko	Svetlana Petrova / Eleva Sereda	Aleksandr Manko / Anastasia Petrova
2005	Aleksei Konakh	Olga Petrova	Aleksei Konakh / Aleksandr Manko	Olga Konon / Elena Sereda	Pavel Voloshin / Olga Konon
2006	Vitali Ziazulia	Anastasiya Petrova	Pavel Kyrilo / Aliaksei Voloshin	Sviatlana Petrova / Anastasiya Petrova	Pavel Kyrilo / Sviatlana Petrova
2007	Aliaksei Voloshin	Anastasiya Petrova	Pavel Kyrilo / Aliaksei Voloshin	Sviatlana Petrova / Anastasiya Petrova	Aliaksei Voloshin / Anastasiya Petrova
2008	Pavel Kyrilo	Anastasiya Cherniavskaya	Pavel Kyrilo / Igar Birukov	Victoryia Varabyova / Yulia Liavitskaya	Pavel Kyrilo / Elena Lukashevich
2009	Pavel Kyrilo	Victoryia Varabyova	Ryhor Varabyou / Vitali Ziazulia	Victoryia Varabyova / Yulia Liavitskaya	Ryhor Varabyou / Victoryia Varabyova
2010	Rygor Varabyov	Victoryia Varabyova	Igar Birukov / Oleg Mezian	Victoryia Varabyova / Yulia Liavitskaya	Ryhor Varabyou / Victoryia Varabyova
2011	Rygor Varabyov	Victoryia Varabyova	Uladzislau Kushnir / Dzmitry Saidakou	Victoryia Varabyova / Elena Lukashevich	Ryhor Varabyou / Victoryia Varabyova
2012	Uladzislau Kushnir	Elena Lukashevich	Uladzislau Kushnir / Dzmitry Saidakou	Elena Lukashevich / Sviatlana Ligatsyk	Dzmitry Saidakou / Elena Lukashevich
2013	Uladzislay Naymay	Ekaterina Chyprinenko	Uladzislay Naymay / Hennadi Karabyn	Victoria Ivanova / Sviatlana Ligatsyk	Uladzislay Naymay / Daria Scherbinskaya
2014	Dmitri Kyzmitski	Julia Bitsoukova	Dmitri Kyzmitski / Pavel Shygaev	Katsiaryna Zablotskaya / Julia Bitsoukova	Dmitri Kyzmitski / Sviatlana Ligatsyk
2015	Andrey Kravchenko	Julia Bitsoukova	Dmitri Kyzmitski / Pavel Shygaev	Julia Boiarovskaya / Maryana Verbitskaya	Dmitri Kyzmitski / Yliana Zaxarova
2016	Dmitri Kyzmitski	Julia Bitsoukova	Vladislav Zhilyanin / Dmitri Kyzmitski	Julia Bitsoukova / Maryana Verbitskaya	Dmitri Kyzmitski / Maryana Verbitskaya
2017	Ilya Laryushin	Maryana Verbitskaya	Andrey Kravchenko / Aleksandr Rakipov	Julia Bitsoukova / Maryana Verbitskaya	Ilya Laryushin / Yliana Zaxarova
