= Jonatan Nordh =

Swedish badminton player (born 1988)

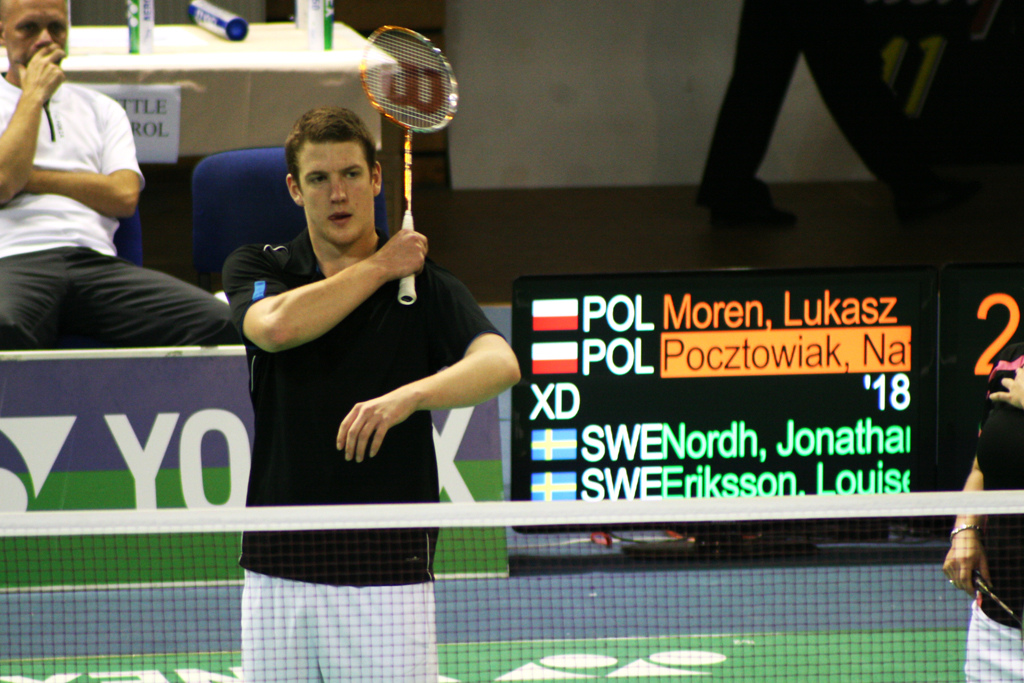
- Jonatan Nordh at the 2011 Czech International

Personal information
- Born: 27 April 1988 (age 38)

Sport
- Country: Sweden
- Sport: Badminton

Men's Doubles & Mixed Doubles
- Highest ranking: 52 (MD) 27 Jun 2013; 41 (XD) 2 Apr 2015
- BWF profile

Jonatan Nordh (born 27 April 1988) is a Swedish male badminton player.

== Achievements ==
=== BWF International Challenge/Series ===
Men's Doubles

Year	Tournament	Partner	Opponent	Score	Result
2012	Kharkiv International	(Sweden) Patrick Lundqvist	(France) Baptiste Careme (France) Gaetan Mittelheisser	23-25, 10–21	(silver) Runner-up

Mixed Doubles

Year	Tournament	Partner	Opponent	Score	Result
2015	Belgian International	(Sweden) Emelie Fabbeke	(Poland) Robert Mateusiak (Poland) Nadieżda Zięba	21-15, 6-21, 8-21	(silver) Runner-up
2014	Czech International	(Sweden) Emelie Fabbeke	(Russia) Anatoliy Yartsev (Russia) Evgenija Kosetskaya	18-21, 21–19, 21–19	(gold) Winner

BWF International Challenge tournament
BWF International Series tournament
BWF Future Series tournament
