= Anastasiya Cherniavskaya =

Belarusian badminton player (born 1992)

Personal information
- Born: 29 May 1992 (age 34) Minsk, Belarus
- Height: 1.73 m (5 ft 8 in)
- Weight: 67 kg (148 lb)

Sport
- Country: Belarus
- Sport: Badminton

Women's singles & doubles
- Highest ranking: 172 (WS 3 May 2018); 78 (WD 2 November 2017); 292 (XD 15 October 2009)
- BWF profile

Anastasiya Igorevna Cherniavskaya (Belarusian: Анастасія Ігараўна Чарняўская, Russian: Анастасия Игоревна Чернявская; born 29 May 1992) is a Belarusian badminton player. She competed at the 2015 Baku and 2019 Minsk European Games.

== Achievements ==
=== BWF International Challenge/Series (1 title, 1 runner-up) ===
Women's doubles
Year	Tournament	Partner	Opponent	Score	Result
2017	Egypt International	(Belarus) Alesia Zaitsava	(India) Sanyogita Ghorpade (India) Prajakta Sawant	21–17, 21–18	(gold) Winner
2016	Latvia International	(Belarus) Alesia Zaitsava	(Russia) Ksenia Evgenova (Russia) Maria Shegurova	21–16, 10–21, 7–21	(silver) Runner-up

BWF International Challenge tournament
BWF International Series tournament
BWF Future Series tournament
