= Anna Narel =

Polish badminton player (born 1989)

Personal information
- Born: 4 January 1989 (age 37)

Sport
- Country: Poland
- Sport: Badminton

Women's
- Highest ranking: 90 (WS) 27 Nov 2014; 81 (WD) 15 Oct 2009; 352 (XD) 1 Dec 2011
- BWF profile
Medal record
Badminton
Representing Poland
European Mixed Team Championships
Bronze medal – third place	2008 Herning	Mixed team

Anna Ościłowicz (born 4 January 1989 as Anna Narel) is a Polish female badminton player.

== Achievements ==
=== BWF International Challenge/Series ===
Women's Singles
Year	Tournament	Opponent	Score	Result
2014	Slovak Open	(Ukraine) Hrystyna Dzhangobekova	11–5, 8–11, 11–8, 11–5	(gold) Winner
2014	Lithuanian International	(Belarus) Alesia Zaitsava	21–19, 21–19	(gold) Winner
2014	Riga International	(Sweden) Matilda Petersen	13–21, 15–21	(silver) Runner-up

Women's Doubles
Year	Tournament	Partner	Opponent	Score	Result
2008	Slovak Open	(Poland) Natalia Pocztowiak	(Republic of Ireland) Chloe Magee (Republic of Ireland) Bing Huang	8–21, 13–21	(silver) Runner-up
2007	Kalev International	(Lithuania) Akvilė Stapušaitytė	(Spain) Lucia Tavera (Spain) Sandra Chirlaque	20–22, 23–21, 18–21	(silver) Runner-up

BWF International Challenge tournament
BWF International Series tournament
BWF Future Series tournament
