= Karoliine Hõim =

Estonian badminton player (born 1989)

Personal information
- Born: 9 March 1989 (age 37) Tallinn, then part of Estonian SSR, Soviet Union
- Height: 1.70 m (5 ft 7 in)

Sport
- Country: Estonia
- Sport: Badminton
- Handedness: Right

Women's singles & doubles
- Highest ranking: 90 (WS 13 October 2011); 121 (WD 17 November 2011); 111 (XD 26 November 2015)
- BWF profile

Karoliine Hõim (born 9 March 1989) is an Estonian badminton player.

Karoliine Hõim was born in Tallinn. She at the Tallinn Kuristiku Gymnasium from 2006 until 2007. She relocated to Finland and attended Helsinki Mäkelänrinne Sports Gymnasium, graduating in 2009. She is a 2013 graduate of Helmi Business College in Helsinki with a degree in tourism, and a 2019 graduate of Laurea University of Applied Sciences with a degree in business administration.

Hõim began badminton training at age 10. She has won twelve gold medals at Estonian championships: 3 in singles (2010–11, 2013), 4 in women's doubles (2010–11, 2013, 2015) and 5 in mixed doubles (2006–07, 2009–11). She was a member of the Estonian national team from 2004 until 2016.

== Achievements ==
=== BWF International Challenge/Series ===
Mixed doubles
Year	Tournament	Partner	Opponent	Score	Result
2006	Riga International	(Estonia) Ants Mängel	(Russia) Anton Nazarenko (Russia) Elena Chernyavskya		(silver) Runner-up
2015	Portugal International	(Finland) Marko Pyykönen	(Sweden) Filip Michael Duwall Myhren (Sweden) Emma Wengberg	15–21, 18–21	(silver) Runner-up

BWF International Challenge tournament
BWF International Series tournament
BWF Future Series tournament
