= Baptiste Carême =

French badminton player (born 1985)

Personal information
- Born: 25 October 1985 (age 41) Grande-Synthe, France
- Height: 1.81 m (5 ft 11 in)
- Weight: 78 kg (172 lb)

Sport
- Country: France
- Sport: Badminton

Men's & mixed doubles
- Highest ranking: 29 (MD); 27 (XD)
- BWF profile
Medal record
Men's badminton
Representing France
European Men's Team Championships
Silver medal – second place	2016 Kazan	Men's team
Mediterranean Games
Bronze medal – third place	2013 Mersin	Men's doubles

Baptiste Carême (born 25 October 1985) is a French badminton player. In 2013, he won bronze medal at the Mediterranean Games in men's doubles event.

== Achievements ==
=== Mediterranean Games ===
Men's doubles
Year	Venue	Partner	Opponent	Score	Result
2013	Mersin University Hall; Mersin, Turkey	(France) Gaëtan Mittelheisser	(Slovenia) Miha Horvat (Slovenia) Iztok Utroša	21–8, 21–14	Bronze

=== BWF Grand Prix ===
The BWF Grand Prix had two levels, the Grand Prix and Grand Prix Gold. It was a series of badminton tournaments sanctioned by the Badminton World Federation (BWF) and played between 2007 and 2017.

Men's doubles
Year	Tournament	Partner	Opponent	Score	Result
2014	Dutch Open	(France) Ronan Labar	(Indonesia) Fran Kurniawan (Indonesia) Agripina Prima Rahmanto Putra	5–11, 11–10, 11–10, 11–7	(gold) Winner

BWF Grand Prix Gold tournament
BWF Grand Prix tournament

=== BWF International Challenge/Series ===
Men's doubles
Year	Tournament	Partner	Opponent	Score	Result
2005	Estonian International	(France) Benoît Azzopard	(Finland) Petri Hyyryläinen (Finland) Iwo Zakowski	6–15, 15–12, 17–15	(gold) Winner
2011	Dutch International	(France) Sylvain Grosjean	(Germany) Peter Käsbauer (Germany) Josche Zurwonne	21–11, 19–21, 21–17	(gold) Winner
2012	White Nights	(France) Gaëtan Mittelheisser	(France) Ronan Labar (France) Mathias Quéré	21–19, 21–19	(gold) Winner
2012	Kharkiv International	(France) Gaëtan Mittelheisser	(Sweden) Patrick Lundqvist (Sweden) Jonatan Nordh	25–23, 21–10	(gold) Winner
2013	French International	(France) Gaëtan Mittelheisser	(Poland) Adam Cwalina (Poland) Przemysław Wacha	18–21, 16–21	(silver) Runner-up
2013	White Nights	(France) Ronan Labar	(Russia) Andrey Ashmarin (Russia) Sergey Shumilkin	21–17, 21–16	(gold) Winner
2014	Swiss International	(France) Ronan Labar	(Philippines) Peter Gabriel Magnaye (Philippines) Paul Jefferson Vivas	11–6, 9–11, 11–10, 6–11, 10–11	(silver) Runner-up

Mixed doubles
Year	Tournament	Partner	Opponent	Score	Result
2005	Lithuanian International	(France) Émilie Despierres	(Wales) Joe Morgan (Lithuania) Ligita Žukauskaitė	17–15, 15–10	(gold) Winner
2008	Croatian International	(France) Laura Choinet	(Bulgaria) Vladimir Metodiev (Bulgaria) Gabriela Banova	21–11, 21–15	(gold) Winner
2010	Turkey International	(France) Laura Choinet	(Denmark) Mads Pieler Kolding (Denmark) Julie Houmann	12–21, 18–21	(silver) Runner-up
2011	White Nights	(France) Audrey Fontaine	(Singapore) Danny Bawa Chrisnanta (Singapore) Vanessa Neo	18–21, 21–19, 15–21	(silver) Runner-up
2012	White Nights	(France) Audrey Fontaine	(Poland) Wojciech Szkudlarczyk (Poland) Agnieszka Wojtkowska	21–17, 21–10	(gold) Winner
2015	Peru International	(France) Anne Tran	(France) Ronan Labar (France) Émilie Lefel	18–21, 21–13, 14–21	(silver) Runner-up

BWF International Challenge tournament
BWF International Series tournament
BWF Future Series tournament
