= Pedro Martins (badminton) =

Portuguese badminton player (born 1990)

Personal information
- Born: Pedro Miguel Assunção Martins; 14 February 1990 (age 36) Portimão, Portugal
- Height: 1.77 m (5 ft 10 in)
- Weight: 71 kg (157 lb)

Sport
- Country: Portugal
- Sport: Badminton
- Handedness: Right
- Coached by: António Leite

Men's singles
- Highest ranking: 52 (13 September 2012)
- BWF profile

Pedro Miguel Assunção Martins (born 14 February 1990 in Portimão, Algarve) is a Portuguese badminton player who joined the national team in 2005. Trained at the ACD CHE Lagoense, Martins competed for Portugal at the 2012 London and 2016 Summer Olympics Men's singles event.

== Achievements ==
=== BWF International Challenge/Series ===
Men's singles
Year	Tournament	Opponent	Score	Result
2016	Jamaica International	(Austria) David Obernosterer	21–19, 21–17	(gold) Winner
2016	Brazil International	(Poland) Adrian Dziółko	21–18, 22–20	(gold) Winner
2016	Uganda International	(Sri Lanka) Niluka Karunaratne	17–21, 15–21	(silver) Runner-up
2016	Iceland International	(Denmark) Kim Bruun	21–10, 14–21, 16–21	(silver) Runner-up
2015	Morocco International	(Uganda) Edwin Ekiring	21–12, 21–14	(gold) Winner
2014	Morocco International	(Belgium) Yuhan Tan	11–8, 11–10, 11–10	(gold) Winner
2011	South Africa International	(Uganda) Edwin Ekiring	21–15, 21–18	(gold) Winner
2011	Suriname International	(Austria) Michael Lahnsteiner	14–21, 21–16, 21–18	(gold) Winner
2011	Syria International	(Iran) Kaveh Mehrabi	21–15, 21–19	(gold) Winner
2010	Puerto Rico International	(Italy) Wisnnu Putro	10–21, 18–21	(silver) Runner-up
2010	Santo Domingo Open	(Guatemala) Kevin Cordon	21–10, 21–13	(gold) Winner
2010	Morocco International	(France) Oliver Fossy	21–12, 21–11	(gold) Winner
2009	Welsh International	(Denmark) Kristian Nielsen	19–21, 21–12, 9–21	(silver) Runner-up
2009	Puerto Rico International	(Guatemala) Kevin Cordon	21–18, 13–21, 17–21	(silver) Runner-up

BWF International Challenge tournament
BWF International Series tournament
