= Scott Evans (badminton) =

Irish badminton player (born 1987)

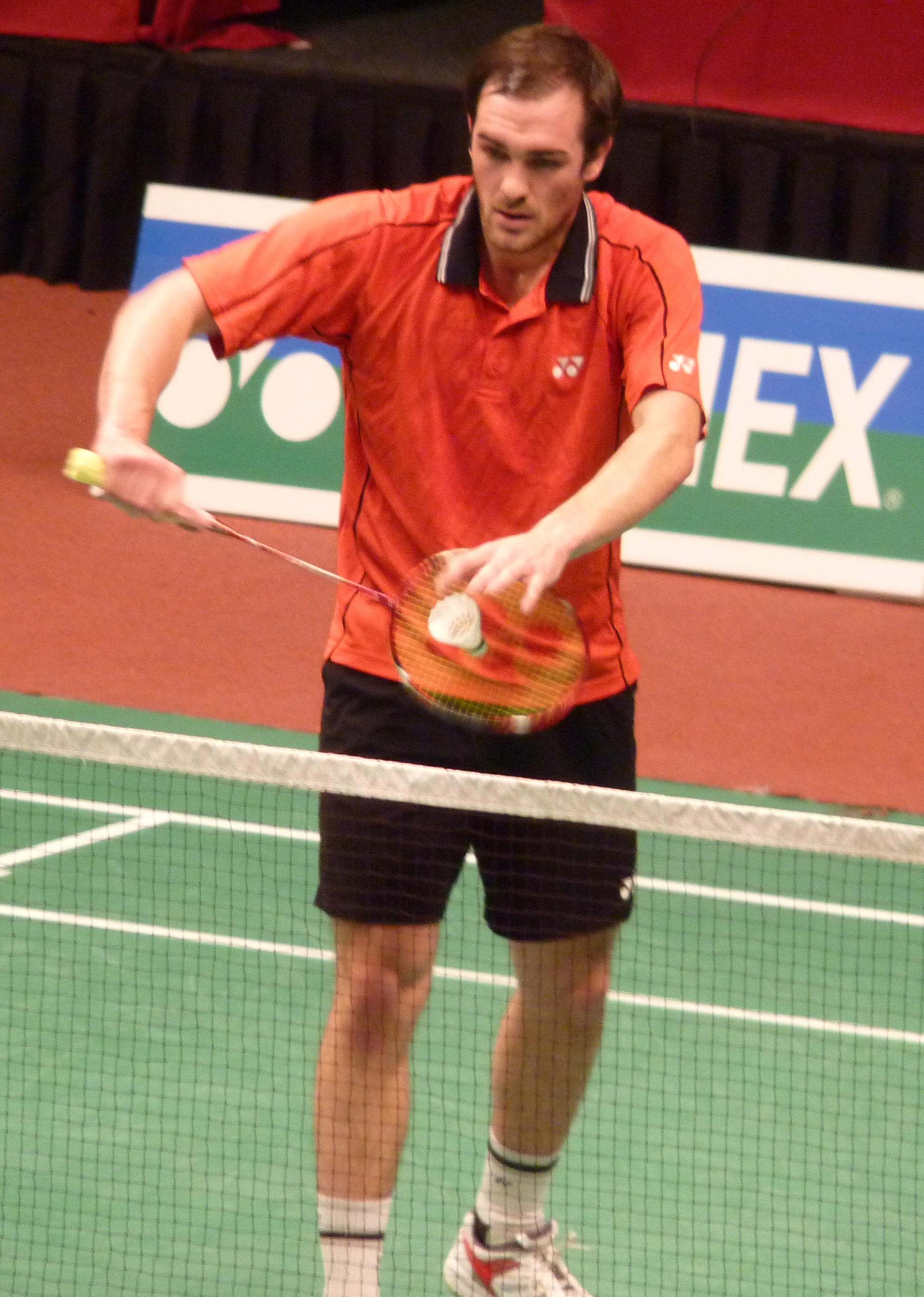

Personal information
- Born: Scott Evans; 26 September 1987 (age 39) Dublin, Ireland
- Years active: 2002–2018
- Height: 1.81 m (5 ft 11 in)
- Weight: 78 kg (172 lb; 12.3 st)

Sport
- Country: Ireland
- Sport: Badminton
- Handedness: Right
- Coached by: Jim Laugesen (2004–12); Peter Gade (2012–2018)

Men's singles
- Career record: 229 wins, 204 losses
- Highest ranking: 23 (18 June 2015)
- Current ranking: 109 (27 Mar 2017)
- BWF profile

Scott Evans (born 26 September 1987 in Dublin) is a former Irish professional badminton player. As of 2017 he was the highest ranked Irish player.

Evans has represented Ireland at the 2008, 2012, and 2016 Olympic Games. He became the first Irishman to win a badminton match at the Olympic during his last participation in 2016. He won the men's singles Irish National Badminton Championships eight consecutive times from 2005 to 2012, becoming the only player to equal James 'Chick' Doyle's record of eight consecutive Irish Men's singles titles.

He attended Wesley College Dublin. In his youth Evans played for Irish association football club Leicester Celtic A.F.C.

== Career ==
Evans has played two-time Olympic gold medalist China's Lin Dan and world No. 1 Malaysia's Lee Chong Wei 3 times each. At the 2011 BWF World Championships, Evans met the second seed and eventual champion Lin Dan in the second round and came out with a 15–21, 16–21 loss. Nearly one year later at the 2012 London Olympics, Evans again met the eventual winner Lin Dan of China in the first round and was defeated 8–21, 14–21. At the 2013 BWF World Championships, Evans lost to top seed and eventual silver medalist Lee Chong Wei of Malaysia in the first round with a score of 14–21, 15–21. Evans moved to Denmark at the age of 16 to pursue his professional career joining Danish club Greve. After 1 season at Greve Evans moved to Gentofte Badminton club where he spent the next 11 years playing for the clubs first team. In 2017 he moved to TSS and played there for 2 years losing in the final of the Danish league both Years. After retiring from badminton Evans returned to Gentofte badminton club to act as head coach for the club for the next 2 years. He is current assistant head coach in Solrod Badminton Club.

=== 2016 Summer Olympics ===
Evans qualified for the 2016 Summer Olympics in the men's singles category. In the group stage, he was put with Germany's Marc Zwiebler and host Brazil's Ygor Coelho de Oliveira. He became the first Irishman to win a badminton game at an Olympics as he beat Zwiebler 9–21, 21–17, 21–7. Evans then won the second match against Ygor Coelho de Oliveira 21–8, 19–21, 21–8. The result means Evans would be qualified for the Round of 16, which he would then face Denmark's Viktor Axelsen. Evans lost to Axelsen 16–21, 12–21 in the round of 16. Evans finished Rio olympic games in 9th position confirming the best ever result in an olympic games for Irish Badminton.

=== Titles ===
Year	Tournament	Opponent in Final	Score
2012	Irish Open	(France) Lucas Corvee	21–19, 21–18
2013	Cyprus International	(England) Andrew Smith	21–17, 21–11
2014	Brasil Open	(Germany) Dieter Domke	7–11, 6–11, 11–6, 11–8, 11–7

BWF Grand Prix tournament
BWF International Series tournament

=== Highlights ===
- 2016 – Irish Open: Men's singles (runner up)
- 2014 – Bitburger Open: Men's singles (runner up)
- 2014 – Bulgarian International: Men's singles (runner up)
- 2011 – Denmark International: Men's singles (semi final)
- 2010 – European Championships: Men's singles (quarter final)
- 2009 – Scottish Open: Men's singles (semi final)
- 2008 – Scott Evans secures qualification to 2008 Summer Olympics
- 2006 – Southern PanAm International: Men's singles (semi final)
- 2006 – Portuguese International: Men's doubles (quarter final)
- 2005 – Hungarian International: Men's singles (runner up)
- 2002 – Helexpo Thessaloniki World Grand Prix: Men's doubles (quarter final)
- 2004 – Welsh International: Men's singles (quarter final)
- 2004 – Italian International: Men's doubles (runner up)
- 2004 – Cyprus International: Men's singles (quarter final)
- 2004 – Cyprus International: Men's doubles (runner up)
- 2004 – Victor Lithuanian International: Men's doubles (runner up)
- 2003 – Italian International: Mixed doubles (quarter final)
- 2002 – Irish International: Men's doubles (quarter final)

Hosbjerg

Evans is Co owner with his wife at Danish ladies fashion brand Hosbjerg. They started the company together in 2014.
