= Yuhan Tan =

Belgian badminton player

Yuhan Tan 谭雨涵
Personal information
- Born: April 21, 1987 (age 39) Bilzen, Belgium
- Height: 1.82 m (6 ft 0 in)
- Weight: 74 kg (163 lb)

Sport
- Country: Belgium
- Sport: Badminton
- Handedness: Left

Men's singles
- Highest ranking: 46 (29 March 2012)
- BWF profile

Yuhan Tan (born 21 April 1987 in Bilzen, Belgium) is a male left-handed badminton player and Orthopedic surgeon from Belgium. Born to a Chinese-Indonesian father and a Belgian mother, He is a 10 time Belgian Champion in the men's singles category which makes him the most successful men's singles athlete in Belgian history. In 2008 he was the 2nd youngest men's singles player to qualify for the 2008 Olympics according to the Badminton World Federation criteria. However the Belgian Olympic Committee did not select him and he was therefore not able to compete. Tan participated at the 2012 Summer Olympics and in the 2016 Summer Olympics together with his sister Lianne.

Tan studied Medicine at the University of Maastricht.

In 2013, Tan was elected as a member of the Badminton World Federation (BWF) Athletes' Commission. In 2015, he was appointed as the Chairman of the BWF Athletes' Commission. In June 2015, he competed at the European Games in Baku, Azerbaijan, before being eliminated at the quarter-finals.

He competed for Belgium at the 2016 Summer Olympics in badminton. He lost to Misha Zilberman of Israel, 22-20 and 21–12, and did not advance to the Round of 16.

In 2017 Tan became the chairman of the Belgian Olympic Committee Athletes' Commission.

== Personal life ==
Tan's father is Chinese Indonesian, while his mother, Maria Meyers, is Belgian (Flemish). His parents met in Belgium, where his father came to study dentistry.

== Achievements ==
=== BWF International Challenge/Series ===
Men's singles
| Year | Tournament | Opponent | Score | Result |
|---|---|---|---|---|
| 2015 | USA International | (Denmark) Emil Holst | 16–21, 20–22 | (silver) Runner-up |
| 2015 | Turkey International | (Israel) Misha Zilberman | 12–21, 21–13, 21–18 | (gold) Winner |
| 2015 | Dutch International | (Denmark) Anders Antonsen | 11–21, 20–22 | (silver) Runner-up |
| 2014 | Morocco International | (Portugal) Pedro Martins | 8–11, 10–11, 10–11 | (silver) Runner-up |
| 2013 | Turkey International | (Slovenia) Iztok Utrosa | 21–11, 21–12 | (gold) Winner |
| 2012 | Austrian International | (Poland) Przemyslaw Wacha | 21–14, 15–21, 16–21 | (silver) Runner-up |
| 2011 | Brazil International | (Poland) Przemyslaw Wacha | 14–21, 19–21 | (silver) Runner-up |
| 2010 | Hungarian International | (Finland) Ville Lang | 20–22, 16–21 | (silver) Runner-up |
| 2008 | Giraldilla International | (United States) Raju Rai | 21–19, 21–19 | (gold) Winner |
| 2006 | Cyprus International | (Denmark) Peter Mikkelsen | 15–21, 21–17, 14–21 | (silver) Runner-up |

BWF International Challenge tournament
BWF International Series tournament
BWF Future Series tournament
