= Christian Bösiger =

Swiss badminton player (born 1984)

Personal information
- Born: 22 March 1984 (age 42) Olten, Switzerland
- Height: 1.73 m (5 ft 8 in)
- Weight: 66 kg (146 lb)

Sport
- Country: Switzerland
- Sport: Badminton
- Handedness: Right

Men's
- Highest ranking: 108 (MS) 19 April 2012; 96 (MD) 22 October 2009; 240 (XD) 17 May 2012
- BWF profile

Christian Bösiger (also spelled Boesiger, born 22 March 1984) is a Swiss male badminton player from Olten club. He competed at the 2008 Summer Olympics in the men's singles event, and reach the second round. Bösiger is a 12-time national champion.

== Career ==
Boesiger played the 2007 BWF World Championships in men's singles, and was defeated in the first round by Yousuke Nakanishi, of Japan, 21–16, 14–21, 21–18. At the 2008 Summer Olympics, he was defeated in the second round by Przemysław Wacha of Poland with the score 12–21, 21–11, 19–21.
