= Ants Mängel =

Estonian badminton player (born 1987)

Ants Mängel (born 26 January 1987) is an Estonian badminton player.

He was born in Tallinn. He started his badminton exercising in 1994, coached by Koit Muru. In 2006 and 2008, he competed at European Championships. Between 2005 and 2011 he won 10 gold medals at Estonian Championships. 2005-2012 he was a member of Estonian national badminton team.
