= Aleksei Konakh =

Belarusian badminton player (born 1987)

Personal information
- Born: 1987 (age 38–39) Brest, Belarus

Sport
- Country: Belarus
- Sport: Badminton

Men's
- Highest ranking: 534 (MS) 21 Jan 2010; 89 (MD) 8 Oct 2009; 58 (XD) 24 Mar 2011
- BWF profile

Aleksei Viktorovich Konakh (Belarusian: Аляксей Віктаравіч Конах, Russian: Алексей Викторович Конах; born 1987) is a Belarusian male badminton player.

== Achievements ==
=== BWF International Challenge/Series ===
Men's Doubles
| Year | Tournament | Partner | Opponent | Score | Result |
|---|---|---|---|---|---|
| 2012 | Slovak Open | (Belarus) Yauheni Yakauchuk | (Wales) Joe Morgan (Wales) Nic Strange | 9-21, 17–21 | (silver) Runner-up |

Mixed Doubles
| Year | Tournament | Partner | Opponent | Score | Result |
|---|---|---|---|---|---|
| 2010 | Slovak Open | (Belarus) Alesia Zaitsava | (Netherlands) Jacco Arends (Netherlands) Selena Piek | 15-21, 14–21 | (silver) Runner-up |
| 2010 | Kharkiv International | (Belarus) Alesia Zaitsava | (Ukraine) Valeriy Atrashchenkov (Ukraine) Elena Prus | 19-21, 16–21 | (silver) Runner-up |
| 2009 | Slovak Open | (Belarus) Alesia Zaitsava | (Denmark) Mark Philip Winther (Denmark) Karina Sørensen | 21-18, 9-21, 13–21 | (silver) Runner-up |

BWF International Challenge tournament
BWF International Series tournament
BWF Future Series tournament
