= Alesia Zaitsava =

Belarusian badminton player (born 1985)

Personal information
- Nickname: Aleska
- Born: Alesia Mikhaylovna Zaitsava; 14 August 1985 (age 41) Brest, Belarus
- Height: 1.62 m (5 ft 4 in)
- Weight: 60 kg (132 lb)

Sport
- Country: Belarus
- Sport: Badminton
- Coached by: Viktar Konakh

Women's singles & doubles
- Highest ranking: 72 (WS 14 March 2013); 78 (WD 2 November 2017); 58 (XD 24 March 2011)
- BWF profile

Alesia Mikhaylovna Zaitsava (Belarusian: Алеся Міхайлаўна Зайцава, Russian: Алеся Михайловна Зайцева; born 14 August 1985) is a Belarusian badminton player. She competed for Belarus at the 2012 Summer Olympics in the women's singles event, but did not advance to the knock-out stage after being defeated by Petya Nedelcheva of Bulgaria and Adriyanti Firdasari of Indonesia in the group stage. She started playing badminton in 1993, and became part of the Belarusian national badminton team in 1996.

== Achievements ==
=== BWF International Challenge/Series (4 titles, 11 runners-up) ===
Women's singles
Year	Tournament	Opponent	Score	Result
2018	Egypt International	(Myanmar) Thet Htar Thuzar	Walkover	(silver) Runner-up
2018	Latvia International	(Estonia) Kristin Kuuba	10–21, 16–21	(silver) Runner-up
2016	Latvia International	(Russia) Elena Komendrovskaja	17–21, 15–21	(silver) Runner-up
2016	Croatian International	(Russia) Elena Komendrovskaja	13–21, 19–21	(silver) Runner-up
2015	Lithuanian International	(Germany) Yvonne Li	14–21, 14–21	(silver) Runner-up
2014	Lithuanian International	(Poland) Anna Narel	19–21, 19–21	(silver) Runner-up
2012	Slovak Open	(Ukraine) Natalya Voytsekh	21–17, 21–13	(gold) Winner
2012	Bulgaria Hebar Open	(Bulgaria) Stefani Stoeva	21–17, 18–21, 21–10	(gold) Winner
2009	Slovak Open	(Indonesia) Gustiani Megawati	17–21, 21–19, 21–10	(gold) Winner

Women's doubles
Year	Tournament	Partner	Opponent	Score	Result
2017	Egypt International	(Belarus) Anastasiya Cherniavskaya	(India) Sanyogita Ghorpade (India) Prajakta Sawant	21–17, 21–18	(gold) Winner
2016	Latvia International	(Belarus) Anastasiya Cherniavskaya	(Russia) Ksenia Evgenova (Russia) Maria Shegurova	21–16, 10–21, 7–21	(silver) Runner-up

Mixed doubles
Year	Tournament	Partner	Opponent	Score	Result
2015	Bahrain International	(Uzbekistan) Artyom Savatyugin	(Malaysia) Tan Yip Jiun (Malaysia) Yang Li Lian	17–21, 10–21	(silver) Runner-up
2010	Slovak Open	(Belarus) Aliaksei Konakh	(Netherlands) Jacco Arends (Netherlands) Selena Piek	15–21, 14–21	(silver) Runner-up
2010	Kharkiv International	(Belarus) Aliaksei Konakh	(Ukraine) Valeriy Atrashchenkov (Ukraine) Elena Prus	19–21, 16–21	(silver) Runner-up
2009	Slovak Open	(Belarus) Aliaksei Konakh	(Denmark) Mark Philip Winther (Denmark) Karina Sørensen	21–18, 9–21, 13–21	(silver) Runner-up

BWF International Challenge tournament
BWF International Series tournament
BWF Future Series tournament
