= Michael Lahnsteiner =

Austrian badminton player (born 1983)

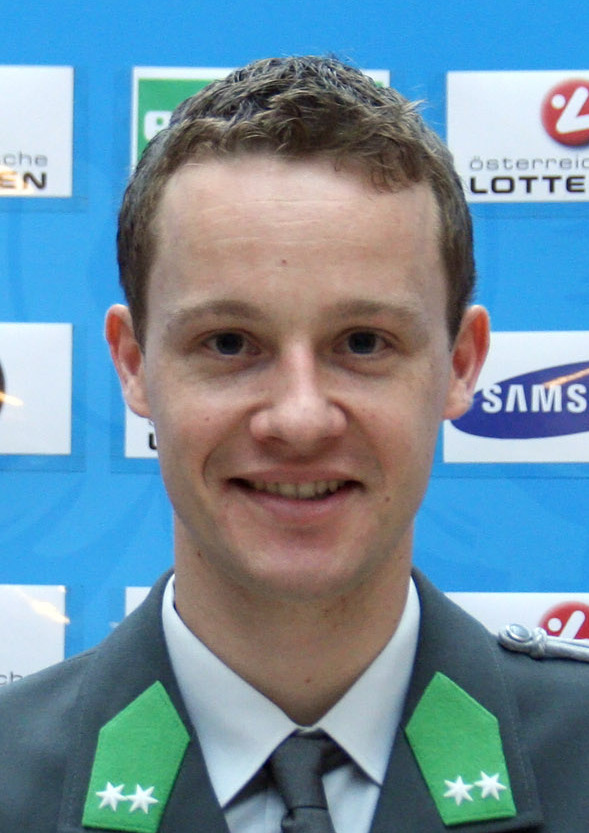
- Michael Lahnsteiner at the 2012 Austrian Olympic Team

Personal information
- Born: 6 December 1983 (age 42)

Sport
- Country: Austria
- Sport: Badminton

Michael Lahnsteiner (born 6 December 1983) is an Austrian badminton player. He competed for Austria at the 2012 Summer Olympics.
