= Iztok Utroša =

Slovenian badminton player (born 1988)

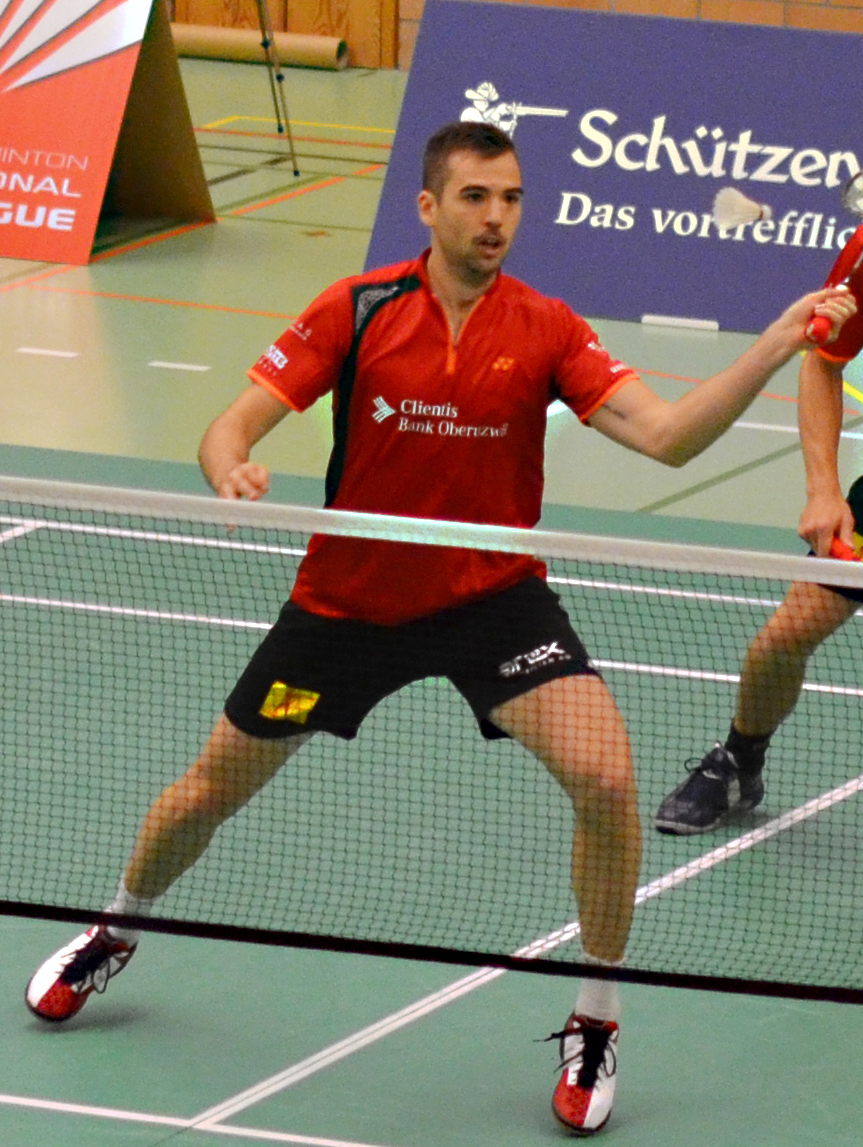

Personal information
- Born: 1 March 1988 (age 38) Murska Sobota, Slovenia
- Height: 1.88 m (6 ft 2 in)
- Weight: 84 kg (185 lb)

Sport
- Country: Slovenia
- Sport: Badminton
- Handedness: Left
- Coached by: Denys Peshekhonov

Men's singles & doubles
- Highest ranking: 83 (MS 11 December 2014); 191 (MD 16 February 2012); 67 (XD 22 October 2009)
- BWF profile

Iztok Utroša (born 1 March 1988) is a Slovenian badminton player. He competed at the 2015 European Games

== Achievements ==
=== BWF International Challenge/Series ===
Men's singles
Year	Tournament	Opponent	Score	Result
2012	Banuinvest International	(Germany) Marcel Reuter	17–21, 17–21	(silver) Runner-up
2012	Slovak Open	(Czech Republic) Jakub Bitman	21–9, 11–7 retired	(gold) Winner
2013	Bulgaria Eurasia Open	(Poland) Michal Rogalski	21–18, 11–21, 12–21	(silver) Runner-up
2013	Turkey International	(Belgium) Yuhan Tan	11–21, 12–21	(silver) Runner-up
2015	Riga International	(Russia) Sirant Sergey	16–21, 20–22	(silver) Runner-up

BWF International Challenge tournament
BWF International Series tournament
BWF Future Series tournament
