= 2012 Dutch Open Grand Prix =

Tournament details
- Dates: 9 October 2012 – 14 October 2012
- Total prize money: US$50,000
- Venue: Topsportcentrum
- Location: Almere, Netherlands

The 2012 Dutch Open Grand Prix was the twelfth grand prix gold and grand prix tournament of the 2012 BWF Grand Prix Gold and Grand Prix. The tournament was held in Topsportcentrum, Almere, Netherlands October 9 until October 14, 2012 and had a total purse of $50,000.

== Men's singles ==
=== Seeds ===
1. (Poland) Przemyslaw Wacha (third round)
2. (Finland) Ville Lang (first round)
3. (Ukraine) Dmytro Zavadsky (quarter-final)
4. (Indonesia) Andre Kurniawan Tedjono (quarter-final)
5. (Belgium) Yuhan Tan (third round)
6. (India) Anand Pawar (withdrew)
7. (Netherlands) Eric Pang (champion)
8. (Netherlands) Dicky Palyama (final)
9. (Germany) Dieter Domke (semi-final)
10. (Republic of Ireland) Scott Evans (quarter-final)
11. (Russia) Vladimir Malkov (withdrew)
12. (Denmark) Rasmus Fladberg (first round)
13. (Denmark) Emil Holst (semi-final)
14. (Czech Republic) Petr Koukal (third round)
15. (Denmark) Christian Lind Thomsen (quarter-final)
16. (Denmark) Rune Ulsing (third round)

=== Finals ===
Quarterfinals
9	(Germany) Dieter Domke	21	23
15	(Denmark) Christian Lind Thomsen	19	21
3	(Ukraine) Dmytro Zavadsky	18	19
7	(Netherlands) Eric Pang	21	21
13	(Denmark) Emil Holst	21	21
4	(Indonesia) Andre Kurniawan Tedjono	16	15
8	(Netherlands) Dicky Palyama	21	21
10	(Republic of Ireland) Scott Evans	11	10

Semifinals
9	(Germany) Dieter Domke	17	13
7	(Netherlands) Eric Pang	21	21
13	(Denmark) Emil Holst	21	19	14
8	(Netherlands) Dicky Palyama	17	21	21

Final
7	(Netherlands) Eric Pang	21	21
8	(Netherlands) Dicky Palyama	14	10

=== Top half ===
==== Section 1 ====
First Round
1	(Poland) P Wacha	21	21
(England) M Spencer-Smith	9	8
(Scotland) K Merrilees	21	21
(Sweden) A Hjelm	14	12
9	(Germany) D Domke	21	21
(France) A Genin	10	19
(Germany) F Hammes	21	21
(Switzerland) A Dumartheray	19	15

Second Round
1	(Poland) P Wacha	21	21
(Scotland) K Merrilees	18	12
9	(Germany) D Domke	21	21
(Germany) F Hammes	12	12

Third Round
1	(Poland) P Wacha	21	10	8
9	(Germany) D Domke	17	21	21

==== Section 2 ====
First Round
PFQ	(Bulgaria) F Shishov	6	13
PFQ	(France) W Goudallier	21	21
(Netherlands) E Meijs	21	21
(Germany) A Roovers	7	17
15	(Denmark) C Thomsen	21	22	21
(Netherlands) N Fransman	11	24	19
(Netherlands) R Starren
BYE

Second Round
PFQ	(France) W Goudallier	11	9
(Netherlands) E Meijs	21	21
15	(Denmark) C Thomsen	21	21
(Netherlands) R Starren	8	12

Third Round
(Netherlands) E Meijs	11	11
15	(Denmark) C Thomsen	21	21

==== Section 3 ====
First Round
3	(Ukraine) D Zavadsky	21	21
Q4	(Netherlands) V de Vries	16	14
(Austria) D Obernosterer	21	21
(Netherlands) M de Jager	12	12
16	(Denmark) R Ulsing	21	21
(Belgium) N Vervaeke	7	7
(Belgium) B Abts	19	13
(Czech Republic) P Florian	21	21

Second Round
3	(Ukraine) D Zavadsky	21	21
(Austria) D Obernosterer	13	9
16	(Denmark) R Ulsing	21	21
(Czech Republic) P Florian	9	17

Third Round
3	(Ukraine) D Zavadsky	21	21
16	(Denmark) R Ulsing	15	16

==== Section 4 ====
First Round
7	(Netherlands) E Pang	21	21
(Mexico) M Moreels	12	14
(Malaysia) Chiang JS	16	19
(Lithuania) K Navickas	21	21
12	(Denmark) R Fladberg	21	12	15
(Germany) Y Pratama	13	21	21
(Germany) K Schaefer	21	21
(Netherlands) H van Os	14	10

Second Round
7	(Netherlands) E Pang	21	21
(Lithuania) K Navickas	14	16
(Germany) Y Pratama	21	21
(Germany) K Schaefer	18	16

Third Round
7	(Netherlands) E Pang	21	13	28
(Germany) Y Pratama	16	21	26

=== Bottom half ===
==== Section 5 ====
First Round
(England) J Green	21	21
(Netherlands) B Gerrits	12	7
Q5	(Netherlands) J Teeuwen	13	15
13	(Denmark) E Holst	21	21
(Germany) N Persson	0^{r}
(Ukraine) A Pochtarev	4
(Germany) S Rduch	21	10
5	(Belgium) Y Tan	23	21

Second Round
(England) J Green	21	16	15
13	(Denmark) E Holst	18	21	21
(Ukraine) A Pochtarev	11	19
5	(Belgium) Y Tan	21	21

Third Round
13	(Denmark) E Holst	21	16	21
5	(Belgium) Y Tan	11	21	18

==== Section 6 ====
First Round
(Switzerland) T Hiramatsu	9	15
Q6	(Germany) F Roth	21	21
PFQ	(Germany) P Kaemnitz	17	21	13
14	(Czech Republic) P Koukal	21	13	21
(Netherlands) J Natenstedt	21	11	21
Q2	(Germany) L Schaenzler	17	21	16
(Belgium) F Kersters	5	6
4	(Indonesia) A Tedjono	21	21

Second Round
Q6	(Germany) F Roth	13	13
14	(Czech Republic) P Koukal	21	21
(Netherlands) J Natenstedt	17	16
4	(Indonesia) A Tedjono	21	21

Third Round
14	(Czech Republic) P Koukal	23	15	16
4	(Indonesia) A Tedjono	21	21	21

==== Section 7 ====
First Round
Q7	(Germany) J Persson
BYE
(Netherlands) M Caljouw
11	(Russia) V Malkov	wo
(Malaysia) B Wong	15	21	13
(Germany) H Kaesbauer	21	12	21
(Austria) L Wraber	10	12
8	(Netherlands) D Palyama	21	21

Second Round
Q7	(Germany) J Persson	21	10	14
(Netherlands) M Caljouw	18	21	21
(Germany) H Kaesbauer	15	21	8
8	(Netherlands) D Palyama	21	19	21

Third Round
(Netherlands) M Caljouw	18	21	10
8	(Netherlands) D Palyama	21	15	21

==== Section 8 ====
First Round
(Czech Republic) J Janacek	16	9
(Germany) M Reuter	21	21
(Germany) A Trisnanto	21	12	13
10	(Republic of Ireland) S Evans	15	21	21
(Austria) M Almer	21	21
Q3	(Switzerland) K Schaffluetzel	12	19
(Sweden) G Ulldahl	21	6
2	(Finland) V Lang	17	1^{r}

Second Round
(Germany) M Reuter	14	16
10	(Republic of Ireland) S Evans	21	21
(Austria) M Almer	14	10
(Sweden) G Ulldahl	21	21

Third Round
10	(Republic of Ireland) S Evans	12	21	21
(Sweden) G Ulldahl	21	14	17

== Women's singles ==
=== Seeds ===
1. (Netherlands) Yao Jie (second round)
2. (Bulgaria) Linda Zechiri (second round)
3. (Czech Republic) Kristina Gavnholt (champion)
4. (New Zealand) Michelle Chan Ky (second round)
5. (Thailand) Salakjit Ponsana (withdrew)
6. (Republic of Ireland) Chloe Magee (quarter-final)
7. (France) Sashina Vignes Waran (withdrew)
8. (Denmark) Karina Jørgensen (quarter-final)

=== Finals ===
Semifinals
(Netherlands) Patty Stolzenbach	15	18
3	(Czech Republic) Kristina Gavnholt	21	21
(Netherlands) Judith Meulendijks	21	21
(Switzerland) Nicole Schaller	8	16

Final
3	(Czech Republic) Kristina Gavnholt	14	21	21
(Netherlands) Judith Meulendijks	21	13	17

=== Top half ===
==== Section 1 ====
First Round
1	(Netherlands) Yao J	0
(England) N Cerfontyne	0^{r}
(Austria) S Prutsch	9	15
(Netherlands) P Stolzenbach	21	21
8	(Denmark) K Jørgensen	21	21
PFQ	(Germany) L Heidenreich	14	11
(Germany) F Deprez	15	22	21
(Ukraine) N Voytsekh	21	20	11

Second Round
1	(Netherlands) Yao J	15	18
(Netherlands) P Stolzenbach	21	21
8	(Denmark) K Jørgensen	17	21	21
(Germany) F Deprez	21	15	15

Quarterfinals
(Netherlands) P Stolzenbach	21	20	21
8	(Denmark) K Jørgensen	18	22	11

==== Section 2 ====
First Round
3	(Czech Republic) K Gavnholt	21	21
PFQ	(England) S Milne	11	13
Q4	(Netherlands) L Malaihollo	18	12
(England) S Walker	21	21
PFQ	(Netherlands) S Eijbergen	13	16
(England) P Riou	21	21
(Switzerland) S Jaquet	21	21
(Scotland) K Gilmour	13	17

Second Round
3	(Czech Republic) K Gavnholt	21	21
(England) S Walker	11	15
(England) P Riou	17	18
(Switzerland) S Jaquet	21	21

Quarterfinals
3	(Czech Republic) K Gavnholt	21	21
(Switzerland) S Jaquet	19	14

=== Bottom half ===
==== Section 3 ====
First Round
(Belgium) L Tan	17	13
(Denmark) L Kjaersfeldt	21	21
Q1	(Germany) L Wich	12	10
6	(Republic of Ireland) C Magee	21	21
(Netherlands) J Meulendijks	21	21
(England) K Robertshaw	14	14
(Czech Republic) L Cerna	14	14
4	(New Zealand) Michelle Chan Ky	21	21

Second Round
(Denmark) L Kjaersfeldt	16	12
6	(Republic of Ireland) C Magee	21	21
(Netherlands) J Meulendijks	21	21
4	(New Zealand) M Chan Ky	18	11

Quarterfinals
6	(Republic of Ireland) C Magee	19	21	15
(Netherlands) J Meulendijks	21	11	21

==== Section 4 ====
First Round
BYE
(Nigeria) G Gabriel
(Denmark) S Jensen	17	21	21
PFQ	(England) E Westwood	21	8	12
Q3	(Netherlands) A Chen	13	21
(Switzerland) N Schaller	21	23
(England) E Cann	12	13
2	(Bulgaria) L Zechiri	21	21

Second Round
(Nigeria) G Gabriel	19	18
(Denmark) S Jensen	21	21
(Switzerland) N Schaller	19	21	18
2	(Bulgaria) L Zechiri	21	9	7^{r}

Quarterfinals
(Denmark) S Jensen	18	14
(Switzerland) N Schaller	21	21

== Men's doubles ==
=== Seeds ===
1. (Poland) Lukasz Moren / Wojciech Szkudlarczyk (semi-final)
2. (Denmark) Christian John Skovgaard / Mads Pieler Kolding (withdrew)
3. (Netherlands) Jorrit de Ruiter / Dave Khodabux (second round)
4. (France) Ronan Labar / Mathias Quere (withdrew)

=== Finals ===
Semifinals
1	(Poland) Lukasz Moren (Poland) Wojciech Szkudlarczyk	16	19
(Indonesia) Markis Kido (Indonesia) Alvent Yulianto	21	21
(Poland) Adam Cwalina (Poland) Przemyslaw Wacha	wo
(Malaysia) Gan Teik Chai (Malaysia) Ong Soon Hock

Final
(Indonesia) Markis Kido (Indonesia) Alvent Yulianto	18	21	21
(Malaysia) Gan Teik Chai (Malaysia) Ong Soon Hock	21	13	14

=== Top half ===
==== Section 1 ====
First Round
1	(Poland) L Moren (Poland) W Szkudlarczyk
BYE
(Czech Republic) P Florian (Czech Republic) J Janacek	19	19
(Netherlands) R Starren (Netherlands) H van Os	21	21
(Germany) J Jansen (Germany) A Trisnanto
BYE
(Denmark) M Elbjorn (Denmark) A Rasmussen	21	21
(England) G Fox (England) B Stawski	19	18

Second Round
1	(Poland) L Moren (Poland) W Szkudlarczyk	22	22
(Netherlands) R Starren (Netherlands) H van Os	20	20
(Germany) J Jansen (Germany) A Trisnanto	14	22	21
(Denmark) M Elbjorn (Denmark) A Rasmussen	21	20	17

Quarterfinals
1	(Poland) L Moren (Poland) W Szkudlarczyk	21	21
(Germany) J Jansen (Germany) A Trisnanto	17	16

==== Section 2 ====
First Round
3	(Netherlands) J de Ruiter (Netherlands) D Khodabux
BYE
(Indonesia) M Kido (Indonesia) A Yulianto	21	21
(Netherlands) M Kruijt (Netherlands) L Nottelman	18	12
(Netherlands) B Gerrits (Netherlands) J Natenstedt	12	14
(France) B Careme (France) G Mittelheisser	21	21
(Netherlands) R Muns (Netherlands) R Tabeling	22	7	11
(England) C Langridge (England) P Mills	20	21	21

Second Round
3	(Netherlands) J de Ruiter (Netherlands) D Khodabux	19	16
(Indonesia) M Kido (Indonesia) A Yulianto	21	21
(France) B Careme (France) G Mittelheisser	16	17
(England) C Langridge (England) P Mills	21	21

Quarterfinals
(Indonesia) M Kido (Indonesia) A Yulianto	21	21
(England) C Langridge (England) P Mills	17	17

=== Bottom half ===
==== Section 3 ====
First Round
(England) M Ellis (Scotland) P Van Rietvelde	21	21
(Netherlands) V de Vries (Netherlands) J Teeuwen	17	17
(Poland) A Cwalina (Poland) P Wacha	21	21
(Netherlands) K Ridder (Malaysia) Tan BS	17	19
(Netherlands) R Bosch (Netherlands) J Middelburg	14	22	18
(Belgium) M Dierickx (Belgium) F Golinski	21	20	21
BYE
4	(France) R Labar (France) M Quere

Second Round
(England) M Ellis (Scotland) P Van Rietvelde	17	12
(Poland) A Cwalina (Poland) P Wacha	21	21
(Belgium) M Dierickx (Belgium) F Golinski
4	(France) R Labar (France) M Quere	wo

Quarterfinals
(Poland) A Cwalina (Poland) P Wacha	21	21
(Belgium) M Dierickx (Belgium) F Golinski	15	9

==== Section 4 ====
First Round
(Sweden) J Johansson-Berg (Sweden) N Ruponen	15	24	22
(England) C Coles (England) M Nottingham	21	22	20
BYE
(Indonesia) Y Suryatama (Indonesia) H Gunawan
(Malaysia) Gan TC (Malaysia) Ong SH	16	21	21
(Netherlands) J Arends (Netherlands) J Maas	21	18	15
BYE
2	(Denmark) C Skovgaard (Denmark) M Kolding

Second Round
(Sweden) J Johansson-Berg (Sweden) N Ruponen	16	11
(Indonesia) Y Suryatama (Indonesia) H Gunawan	21	21
(Malaysia) Gan TC (Malaysia) Ong SH
2	(Denmark) C Skovgaard (Denmark) M Kolding	wo

Quarterfinals
(Indonesia) Y Suryatama (Indonesia) H Gunawan	21	17	18
(Malaysia) Gan TC (Malaysia) Ong SH	12	21	21

== Women's doubles ==
=== Seeds ===
1. (Sweden) Emma Wengberg / Emelie Lennartsson (quarter-final)
2. (Indonesia) Pia Zebadiah / Rizki Amelia Pradipta (quarter-final)
3. (Netherlands) Selena Piek / Iris Tabeling (champion)
4. (Belgium) Steffi Annys / Severine Corvilain (second round)

=== Finals ===
Semifinals
(Netherlands) Samantha Barning (Netherlands) Eefje Muskens	21	19	21
(Poland) Kamila Augustyn (Poland) Agnieszka Wojtkowska	19	21	14
3	(Netherlands) Selena Piek (Netherlands) Iris Tabeling	21	21
(England) Heather Olver (England) Kate Robertshaw	19	19

Final
(Netherlands) Samantha Barning (Netherlands) Eefje Muskens	21	16	20
3	(Netherlands) Selena Piek (Netherlands) Iris Tabeling	19	21	22

=== Top half ===
==== Section 1 ====
First Round
1	(Sweden) E Wengberg (Sweden) E Lennartsson
BYE
(Netherlands) M Halkema (Netherlands) M Sibbald	14	14
(France) A Fontaine (France) E Lefel	21	21
(Netherlands) S Barning (Netherlands) E Muskens
BYE
(Netherlands) J Campman (Netherlands) E Kooijman	13	11
(Netherlands) M van Daal (Nigeria) G Gabriel	21	21

Second Round
1	(Sweden) E Wengberg (Sweden) E Lennartsson	22	18	21
(France) A Fontaine (France) E Lefel	20	21	13
(Netherlands) S Barning (Netherlands) E Muskens	21	21
(Netherlands) M van Daal (Nigeria) G Gabriel	11	7

Quarterfinals
1	(Sweden) E Wengberg (Sweden) E Lennartsson	10	23	15
(Netherlands) S Barning (Netherlands) E Muskens	21	21	21

==== Section 2 ====
First Round
4	(Belgium) S Annys (Belgium) S Corvilain
BYE
(Germany) K Kattenbeck (Germany) L Wich	14	10
(Poland) K Augustyn (Poland) A Wojtkowska	21	21
(England) J Fletcher (England) A Lim
BYE
(England) S Brown (England) H Lewczynska	12	21	20
(Germany) L Efler (Germany) R Hacks	21	16	22

Second Round
4	(Belgium) S Annys (Belgium) S Corvilain	16	17
(Poland) K Augustyn (Poland) A Wojtkowska	21	21
(England) J Fletcher (England) A Lim	21	21
(Germany) L Efler (Germany) R Hacks	14	17

Quarterfinals
(Poland) K Augustyn (Poland) A Wojtkowska	21	21
(England) J Fletcher (England) A Lim	11	15

=== Bottom half ===
==== Section 3 ====
First Round
(Netherlands) G Severien (Netherlands) M Verheul
(Germany) A Hammes (Germany) I Wienefeld	wo
(Netherlands) S Eijbergen (Netherlands) P Stolzenbach
(England) J Wallwork (England) A Langley	wo
(Netherlands) T Peters (Netherlands) P van Dooremalen	wo
(Germany) J Karnott (Germany) H Pohl
BYE
3	(Netherlands) S Piek (Netherlands) I Tabeling

Second Round
(Netherlands) G Severien (Netherlands) M Verheul	11	21	16
(Netherlands) S Eijbergen (Netherlands) P Stolzenbach	21	15	21
(Germany) J Karnott (Germany) H Pohl	17	13
3	(Netherlands) S Piek (Netherlands) I Tabeling	21	21

Quarterfinals
(Netherlands) S Eijbergen (Netherlands) P Stolzenbach	13	20
3	(Netherlands) S Piek (Netherlands) I Tabeling	21	22

==== Section 4 ====
First Round
(Netherlands) L Malaihollo (Netherlands) Y Sie	17	18
(England) H Olver (England) K Robertshaw	21	21
BYE
(Denmark) L Kruse (Denmark) L Grebak
(England) G White (England) L Smith
(Netherlands) G Mahulette (Netherlands) I Vaessen	wo
BYE
2	(Indonesia) P Zebadiah (Indonesia) R Pradipta

Second Round
(England) H Olver (England) K Robertshaw	21	21
(Denmark) L Kruse (Denmark) L Grebak	13	16
(England) G White (England) L Smith	17	14
2	(Indonesia) P Zebadiah (Indonesia) R Pradipta	21	21

Quarterfinals
(England) H Olver (England) K Robertshaw	21	21
2	(Indonesia) P Zebadiah (Indonesia) R Pradipta	19	17

== Mixed doubles ==
=== Seeds ===
1. (Switzerland) Anthony Dumartheray / Sabrina Jaquet (semi-final)
2. (France) Baptiste Careme / Audrey Fontaine (second round)
3. (Poland) Wojciech Szkudlarczyk / Agnieszka Wojtkowska (quarter-final)
4. (France) Ronan Labar / Laura Choinet (first round)
5. (Denmark) Mads Pieler Kolding / Kamilla Rytter Juhl (champion)
6. (England) Marcus Ellis / Gabrielle White (final)
7. (Indonesia) Markis Kido / Pia Zebadiah (semi-final)
8. (Netherlands) Dave Khodabux / Selena Piek (second round)

=== Finals ===
Semifinals
1	(Switzerland) Anthony Dumartheray (Switzerland) Sabrina Jaquet	10	16
5	(Denmark) Mads Pieler Kolding (Denmark) Kamilla Rytter Juhl	21	21
7	(Indonesia) Markis Kido (Indonesia) Pia Zebadiah	12	19
6	(England) Marcus Ellis (England) Gabrielle White	21	21

Final
5	(Denmark) Mads Pieler Kolding (Denmark) Kamilla Rytter Juhl	21	21
6	(England) Marcus Ellis (England) Gabrielle White	15	13

=== Top half ===
==== Section 1 ====
First Round
1	(Switzerland) A Dumartheray (Switzerland) S Jaquet	21	21
(England) C Coles (England) J Fletcher	14	7
(England) B Stawski (England) L Smith	21	21
(Switzerland) K Schaffluetzel (Netherlands) M van Daal	9	13
8	(Netherlands) D Khodabux (Netherlands) S Piek	21	18	21
(Germany) H Kaesbauer (Germany) K Kattenbeck	12	21	12
(Netherlands) J de Ruiter (Netherlands) S Barning	16	21	21
(Indonesia) A Yulianto (Indonesia) R Pradipta	21	9	12

Second Round
1	(Switzerland) A Dumartheray (Switzerland) S Jaquet	14	21	21
(England) B Stawski (England) L Smith	21	15	18
8	(Netherlands) D Khodabux (Netherlands) S Piek	27	20	20
(Netherlands) J de Ruiter (Netherlands) S Barning	25	22	22

Quarterfinals
1	(Switzerland) A Dumartheray (Switzerland) S Jaquet	21	21
(Netherlands) J de Ruiter (Netherlands) S Barning	15	19

==== Section 2 ====
First Round
4	(France) R Labar (France) L Choinet	13	8
(England) C Langridge (England) H Olver	21	21
(England) G Fox (England) S Ward	17	17
Q1	(Denmark) A Rasmussen (Denmark) L Grebak	21	21
5	(Denmark) M Kolding (Denmark) K Juhl	21	21
(France) G Mittelheisser (France) E Lefel	8	15
PFQ	(Netherlands) R Starren (Netherlands) J Campman	21	21
(Belgium) M Moreels (Belgium) S Corvilain	18	13

Second Round
(England) C Langridge (England) H Olver	21	21
Q1	(Denmark) A Rasmussen (Denmark) L Grebak	10	9
5	(Denmark) M Kolding (Denmark) K Juhl	21	21
PFQ	(Netherlands) R Starren (Netherlands) J Campman	13	15

Quarterfinals
(England) C Langridge (England) H Olver	15	15
5	(Denmark) M Kolding (Denmark) K Juhl	21	21

=== Bottom half ===
==== Section 3 ====
First Round
(Czech Republic) J Janacek (Czech Republic) L Cerna
BYE
(Denmark) M Elbjorn (Denmark) L Kjaersfeldt	22	12
7	(Indonesia) M Kido (Indonesia) P Zebadiah	24	21
PFQ	(England) P Mills (England) A Lim	21	19	19
Q3	(Netherlands) K Ridder (Netherlands) P van Dooremalen	19	21	21
(Netherlands) L Nottelman (Netherlands) M Verheul	14	19
3	(Poland) W Szkudlarczyk (Poland) A Wojtkowska	21	21

Second Round
(Czech Republic) J Janacek (Czech Republic) L Cerna	10	15
7	(Indonesia) M Kido (Indonesia) P Zebadiah	21	21
Q3	(Netherlands) K Ridder (Netherlands) P van Dooremalen	23	7	17
3	(Poland) W Szkudlarczyk (Poland) A Wojtkowska	21	21	21

Quarterfinals
7	(Indonesia) M Kido (Indonesia) P Zebadiah	21	21
3	(Poland) W Szkudlarczyk (Poland) A Wojtkowska	18	19

==== Section 4 ====
First Round
(England) M Nottingham (England) A Langley	11	20
PFQ	(Sweden) N Ruponen (Sweden) A Hogstrom	21	22
(Belgium) M Dierickx (Belgium) D Janssens	12	10
6	(England) M Ellis (England) G White	21	21
Q4	(Netherlands) R Tabeling (Netherlands) M Halkema	11	21	21
(Netherlands) J Arends (Netherlands) I Vaessen	21	14	10
(Netherlands) J Maas (Netherlands) I Tabeling	21	16	14
2	(France) B Careme (France) A Fontaine	16	21	21

Second Round
PFQ	(Sweden) N Ruponen (Sweden) A Hogstrom	13	15
6	(England) M Ellis (England) G White	21	21
Q4	(Netherlands) R Tabeling (Netherlands) M Halkema	21	21
2	(France) B Careme (France) A Fontaine	15	19

Quarterfinals
6	(England) M Ellis (England) G White	21	21
Q4	(Netherlands) R Tabeling (Netherlands) M Halkema	19	14

Preceded by 2012 Chinese Taipei Open Grand Prix Gold	BWF Grand Prix Gold and Grand Prix; 2012 season	Succeeded by 2012 Bitburger Open Grand Prix Gold
