= 2012 Bitburger Open Grand Prix Gold =

Tournament details
- Dates: October 30, 2012 - November 4, 2012
- Total prize money: US$120,000
- Venue: Saarlandhalle
- Location: Saarbrücken, Germany

The 2012 Bitburger Open Grand Prix Gold was the thirtieth grand prix gold and grand prix tournament of the 2012 BWF Grand Prix Gold and Grand Prix. The tournament was held in Saarlandhalle, Saarbrücken, Germany October 30 until November 4, 2012, and had a total purse of $120,000.

== Men's singles ==
=== Seeds ===
1. (Denmark) Hans-Kristian Vittinghus (third round)
2. (Germany) Marc Zwiebler (final)
3. (England) Rajiv Ouseph (semi-final)
4. (Chinese Taipei) Hsu Jen-hao (first round)
5. (Chinese Taipei) Chou Tien-chen (champion)
6. (Malaysia) Mohd Arif Abdul Latif (semi-final)
7. (Sweden) Henri Hurskainen (third round)
8. (Finland) Ville Lang (quarter-final)
9. (Ukraine) Dmytro Zavadsky (first round)
10. (France) Brice Leverdez (second round)
11. (Indonesia) Andre Kurniawan Tedjono (quarter-final)
12. (Denmark) Joachim Persson (first round)
13. (Ukraine) Valeriy Atrashchenkov (first round)
14. (Netherlands) Eric Pang (quarter-final)
15. (Israel) Misha Zilberman (first round)
16. (Austria) Michael Lahnsteiner (second round)

=== Finals ===
Quarterfinals
14 | (Netherlands) Eric Pang | 16 | 21 | 6
5 | (Chinese Taipei) Chou Tien-chen | 21 | 9 | 21
3 | (England) Rajiv Ouseph | 21 | 21
(Republic of Ireland) Scott Evans | 14 | 12
6 | (Malaysia) Mohd Arif Abdul Latif | 21 | 21 | 21
11 | (Indonesia) Andre Kurniawan Tedjono | 23 | 19 | 17
8 | (Finland) Ville Lang | 9 | 13
2 | (Germany) Marc Zwiebler | 21 | 21

Semifinals
5 | (Chinese Taipei) Chou Tien-chen | 14 | 21 | 23
3 | (England) Rajiv Ouseph | 21 | 17 | 21
6 | (Malaysia) Mohd Arif Abdul Latif | 10 | 21 | 15
2 | (Germany) Marc Zwiebler | 21 | 17 | 21

Final
5 | (Chinese Taipei) Chou Tien-chen | 21 | 21
2 | (Germany) Marc Zwiebler | 19 | 12

=== Top half ===
==== Section 1 ====
First Round
1 | (Denmark) H Vittinghus | 21 | 21
Q2 | (Germany) K Schaefer | 10 | 12
(Malaysia) Goh SH | 21 | 21
Q1 | (Germany) K Waldenberger | 9 | 10
14 | (Netherlands) E Pang | 21 | 13 | 21
(Denmark) R Fladberg | 17 | 21 | 16
(Slovakia) J Vicen | 21 | 21
(Switzerland) A Dumartheray | 12 | 13

Second Round
1 | (Denmark) H Vittinghus | 22 | 21
(Malaysia) Goh SH | 20 | 17
14 | (Netherlands) E Pang | 22 | 21
(Slovakia) J Vicen | 20 | 13

Third Round
1 | (Denmark) H Vittinghus | 21 | 21 | 16
14 | (Netherlands) E Pang | 23 | 18 | 21

==== Section 2 ====
First Round
5 | (Chinese Taipei) Chou T-c | 21 | 21
(United States) B Seguin | 16 | 11
(Indonesia) I Ade Chandra | 7 | 17
PFQ | (Slovenia) L Petric | 21 | 21
15 | (Israel) M Zilberman | 17 | 13
(Germany) M Reuter | 21 | 21
(Thailand) P Vilailak | 21 | 21
(Italy) W Putro | 15 | 12

Second Round
5 | (Chinese Taipei) Chou T-c | 21 | 21
PFQ | (Slovenia) L Petric | 18 | 18
(Germany) M Reuter | 13 | 25 | 17
(Thailand) P Vilailak | 21 | 23 | 21

Third Round
5 | (Chinese Taipei) Chou T-c | 21 | 21
(Thailand) P Vilailak | 16 | 16

==== Section 3 ====
First Round
3 | (England) R Ouseph | 21 | 21
(Germany) F Hammes | 13 | 8
(Germany) D Domke | 20 | 21 | 10
(Malaysia) B Wong | 22 | 15 | 5^{r}
10 | (France) B Leverdez | 21 | 21
(Denmark) K Bruun | 16 | 18
(Belgium) M Moreels | 12 | 21 | 12
(India) A Sridhar | 21 | 17 | 21

Second Round
3 | (England) R Ouseph | 21 | 21
(Germany) D Domke | 18 | 12
10 | (France) B Leverdez | 15 | 22
(India) A Sridhar | 21 | 24

Third Round
3 | (England) R Ouseph | 21 | 16 | 21
(India) A Sridhar | 18 | 21 | 11

==== Section 4 ====
First Round
7 | (Sweden) H Hurskainen | 13 | 21 | 21
Q3 | (Germany) H Kaesbauer | 21 | 11 | 14
(Czech Republic) P Koukal | 21 | 16 | 30
(Denmark) E Holst | 17 | 21 | 29
9 | (Ukraine) D Zavadsky | 18 | 15
(Republic of Ireland) S Evans | 21 | 21
(Germany) S Rduch | 13 | 16
(Finland) E Heino | 21 | 21

Second Round
7 | (Sweden) H Hurskainen | 21 | 21
(Czech Republic) P Koukal | 15 | 15
(Republic of Ireland) S Evans | 21 | 21
(Finland) E Heino | 14 | 17

Third Round
7 | (Sweden) H Hurskainen | 18 | 21
(Republic of Ireland) S Evans | 21 | 23

=== Bottom half ===
==== Section 5 ====
First Round
(Ukraine) A Pochtarev | 13 | 10
(Germany) L Schmidt | 21 | 21
(Malaysia) I Zainuddin | 21 | 21
13 | (Ukraine) V Atrashchenkov | 17 | 17
(Ukraine) V Konov | 21 | 21
Q8 | (Germany) A Roover | 14 | 16
Q6 | (Germany) T Wadenka | 10 | 14
6 | (Malaysia) A Abdul Latif | 21 | 21

Second Round
(Germany) L Schmidt | 16 | 21 | 21
(Malaysia) I Zainuddin | 21 | 11 | 16
(Ukraine) V Konov | 21 | 19 | 15
6 | (Malaysia) A Abdul Latif | 18 | 21 | 21

Third Round
(Germany) L Schmidt | 13 | 16
6 | (Malaysia) A Abdul Latif | 21 | 21

==== Section 6 ====
First Round
(Germany) Y Pratama | 27 | 21
(Scotland) K Merrilees | 25 | 18
Q7 | (Germany) M Heumann | 21 | 15
11 | (Indonesia) A Tedjono | 23 | 21
(France) M Lo Ying Ping | 21 | 16 | 21
(Uganda) E Ekiring | 11 | 21 | 17
(India) A Bhat | 21 | 21
4 | (Chinese Taipei) Hsu J-h | 14 | 17

Second Round
(Germany) Y Pratama | 17 | 4^{r}
11 | (Indonesia) A Tedjono | 21 | 14
(France) M Lo Ying Ping | 16 | 9
(India) A Bhat | 21 | 21

Third Round
11 | (Indonesia) A Tedjono | 21 | 21
(India) A Bhat | 16 | 16

==== Section 7 ====
First Round
(Germany) R Domke | 17 | 21 | 15
Q5 | (Germany) S Schoettler | 21 | 19 | 21
(Germany) N Persson | 0^{r}
16 | (Austria) M Lahnsteiner | 2
(Denmark) C Thomsen | 25 | 21
(Sweden) G Ulldahl | 23 | 18
(England) M Spencer-Smith | 14 | 14
8 | (Finland) V Lang | 21 | 21

Second Round
Q5 | (Germany) S Schoettler | 21 | 17 | 21
16 | (Austria) M Lahnsteiner | 16 | 21 | 13
(Denmark) C Thomsen | 14 | 21 | 15
8 | (Finland) V Lang | 21 | 16 | 21

Third Round
Q5 | (Germany) S Schoettler | 19 | 19
8 | (Finland) V Lang | 21 | 21

==== Section 8 ====
First Round
Q4 | (Germany) A Trisnanto | 17 | 15
(Malaysia) R Misbun | 21 | 21
(Malaysia) Chan KB | 21 | 21
12 | (Denmark) J Persson | 17 | 15
(Lithuania) K Navickas | 21 | 6
(Malaysia) Chiang JS | 16 | 2^{r}
(Netherlands) E Meijs | 14 | 16
2 | (Germany) M Zwiebler | 21 | 21

Second Round
(Malaysia) R Misbun | 21 | 21
(Malaysia) Chan KB | 15 | 10
(Lithuania) K Navickas | 11 | 5^{r}
2 | (Germany) M Zwiebler | 21 | 11

Third Round
(Malaysia) R Misbun | 15 | 15
2 | (Germany) M Zwiebler | 21 | 21

== Women's singles ==
=== Seeds ===
1. (Germany) Juliane Schenk (champion)
2. (Netherlands) Yao Jie (final)
3. (Bulgaria) Petya Nedelcheva (semi-final)
4. (Spain) Carolina Marín (semi-final)
5. (Malaysia) Tee Jing Yi (second round)
6. (New Zealand) Michelle Chan Ky (second round)
7. (Germany) Karin Schnaase (quarter-final)
8. (France) Sashina Vignes Waran (quarter-final)

=== Finals ===
Semifinals
1 | (Germany) Juliane Schenk | 14 | 21 | 21
3 | (Bulgaria) Petya Nedelcheva | 21 | 6 | 15
4 | (Spain) Carolina Marín | 17 | 15
2 | (Netherlands) Yao Jie | 21 | 21

Final
1 | (Germany) Juliane Schenk | 21 | 15 | 25
2 | (Netherlands) Yao Jie | 10 | 21 | 23

=== Top half ===
==== Section 1 ====
First Round
1 | (Germany) J Schenk | 21 | 21
(Slovenia) K Stankovic | 14 | 11
(Austria) S Kohlfurst | 9 | 15
(Belgium) S Devooght | 21 | 21
6 | (New Zealand) M Chan Ky | 21 | 21
(Germany) L Heidenreich | 11 | 13
(England) E Cann | 9 | 16
(Germany) O Konon | 21 | 21

Second Round
1 | (Germany) J Schenk | 21 | 21
(Belgium) S Devooght | 10 | 12
6 | (New Zealand) M Chan Ky | 14 | 8
(Germany) O Konon | 21 | 21

Quarterfinals
1 | (Germany) J Schenk | 21 | 21
(Germany) O Konon | 14 | 16

==== Section 2 ====
First Round
3 | (Bulgaria) P Nedelcheva | 21 | 21
(Ukraine) L Griga | 17 | 8
Q4 | (Germany) H Pohl | 14 | 10
Q2 | (Germany) A Horbach | 21 | 21
5 | (Malaysia) Tee JY | 21 | 21
(Czech Republic) Z Pavelkova | 8 | 10
(Thailand) S Ponsana | wo
(Scotland) K Gilmour

Second Round
3 | (Bulgaria) P Nedelcheva | 21 | 21
Q2 | (Germany) A Horbach | 4 | 4
5 | (Malaysia) Tee JY | 14 | 18
(Scotland) K Gilmour | 21 | 21

Quarterfinals
3 | (Bulgaria) P Nedelcheva | 21 | 19 | 21
(Scotland) K Gilmour | 18 | 21 | 19

=== Bottom half ===
==== Section 3 ====
First Round
(Wales) C Turner | 21 | 21
Q3 | (France) J Delaune | 17 | 18
(Ukraine) N Voytsekh | 19 | 13
8 | (France) S Vignes Waran | 21 | 21
(Republic of Ireland) C Magee | 21 | 21
(Indonesia) M Wiranto | 16 | 18
(Germany) C Vogelgsang | 11 | 7
4 | (Spain) C Marín | 21 | 21

Second Round
(Wales) C Turner | 17 | 12
8 | (France) S Vignes Waran | 21 | 21
(Republic of Ireland) C Magee | wo
4 | (Spain) C Marín

Quarterfinals
8 | (France) S Vignes Waran | 16 | 12
4 | (Spain) C Marín | 21 | 21

==== Section 4 ====
First Round
(Austria) N Ziesig | 9 | 19
(Bulgaria) D Popstoikova | 21 | 21
(Denmark) K Jorgensen | 16 | 8
7 | (Germany) K Schnaase | 21 | 21
(Germany) F Deprez | 21 | 21
Q1 | (Germany) R Hacks | 12 | 14
(Switzerland) S Jaquet | 12 | 11
2 | (Netherlands) Yao J | 21 | 21

Second Round
(Bulgaria) D Popstoikova | 9 | 9
7 | (Germany) K Schnaase | 21 | 21
(Germany) F Deprez | 18 | 12
2 | (Netherlands) Yao J | 21 | 21

Quarterfinals
7 | (Germany) K Schnaase | 10 | 11
2 | (Netherlands) Yao J | 21 | 21

== Men's doubles ==
=== Seeds ===
1. (Denmark) Mathias Boe / Carsten Mogensen (withdrew)
2. (Germany) Ingo Kindervater / Johannes Schöttler (champion)
3. (England) Chris Adcock / Andrew Ellis (semi-final)
4. (Germany) Michael Fuchs / Oliver Roth (second round)
5. (Indonesia) Yonathan Suryatama / Hendra Aprida Gunawan (quarter-final)
6. (Austria) Jurgen Koch / Peter Zauner (quarter-final)
7. (Poland) Lukasz Moren / Wojciech Szkudlarczyk (quarter-final)
8. (Netherlands) Jorrit de Ruiter / Dave Khodabux (second round)

=== Finals ===
Semifinals
(Denmark) Rasmus Bonde (Denmark) Mads Conrad-Petersen | 21 | 15 | 20
(England) Chris Langridge (England) Peter Mills | 14 | 21 | 22
3 | (England) Chris Adcock (England) Andrew Ellis | 21 | 17 | 19
2 | (Germany) Ingo Kindervater (Germany) Johannes Schöttler | 17 | 21 | 21

Final
(England) Chris Langridge (England) Peter Mills | 15 | 11
2 | (Germany) Ingo Kindervater (Germany) Johannes Schöttler | 21 | 21

=== Top half ===
==== Section 1 ====
First Round
1 | (Denmark) M Boe (Denmark) C Mogensen | wo
(Germany) A Heinz (Germany) M Schwenger
(Sweden) J Johansson-Berg (Sweden) N Ruponen | 8 | 16
(Denmark) R Bonde (Denmark) M Conrad-Petersen | 21 | 21
5 | (Indonesia) Y Suryatama (Indonesia) H Gunawan | 21 | 21
(Belgium) M Dierickx (Belgium) F Golinski | 18 | 18
(Ukraine) V Konov (Ukraine) D Zavadsky | 21 | 21
(Germany) T Felsner (Germany) D Mueller | 11 | 18

Second Round
(Germany) A Heinz (Germany) M Schwenger | 18 | 12
(Denmark) R Bonde (Denmark) M Conrad-Petersen | 21 | 21
5 | (Indonesia) Y Suryatama (Indonesia) H Gunawan | 21 | 21
(Ukraine) V Konov (Ukraine) D Zavadsky | 16 | 14

Quarterfinals
(Denmark) R Bonde (Denmark) M Conrad-Petersen | 19 | 21 | 21
5 | (Indonesia) Y Suryatama (Indonesia) H Gunawan | 21 | 11 | 11

==== Section 2 ====
First Round
4 | (Germany) M Fuchs (Germany) O Roth | 15 | 21 | 21
(Netherlands) J Arends (Netherlands) J Maas | 21 | 14 | 19
(England) C Langridge (England) P Mills | 23 | 20 | 23
(Germany) P Kaesbauer (Germany) J Zurwonne | 21 | 22 | 21
6 | (Austria) J Koch (Austria) P Zauner | 21 | 24
(Germany) D Benz (Germany) R Georg | 10 | 22
(Indonesia) I Ade Chandra (Italy) W Putro | 21 | 5 | 17
(Germany) R Beck (Germany) F Holzer | 14 | 21 | 21

Second Round
4 | (Germany) M Fuchs (Germany) O Roth | 21 | 22 | 13
(England) C Langridge (England) P Mills | 19 | 24 | 21
6 | (Austria) J Koch (Austria) P Zauner | 18 | 21 | 21
(Germany) R Beck (Germany) F Holzer | 21 | 19 | 14

Quarterfinals
(England) C Langridge (England) P Mills | 21 | 21
6 | (Austria) J Koch (Austria) P Zauner | 10 | 10

=== Bottom half ===
==== Section 3 ====
First Round
(Scotland) R Blair (Netherlands) K Ridder
(Sweden) P Lundqvist (Sweden) J Nordh | wo
(Germany) L Bednorsch (Germany) P Beier | 21 | 10 | 19
8 | (Netherlands) J de Ruiter (Netherlands) D Khodabux | 19 | 21 | 21
(Germany) M Heumann (Germany) T Wadenka | 13 | 11
(Denmark) A Kristiansen (Denmark) A Rasmussen | 21 | 21
(Luxembourg) A Thomas (Luxembourg) M Vallenthini | 7 | 6
3 | (England) C Adcock (England) A Ellis | 21 | 21

Second Round
(Scotland) R Blair (Netherlands) K Ridder | 21 | 21
8 | (Netherlands) J de Ruiter (Netherlands) D Khodabux | 19 | 17
(Denmark) A Kristiansen (Denmark) A Rasmussen | 11 | 21 | 17
3 | (England) C Adcock (England) A Ellis | 21 | 16 | 21

Quarterfinals
(Scotland) R Blair (Netherlands) K Ridder | 17 | 19
3 | (England) C Adcock (England) A Ellis | 21 | 21

==== Section 4 ====
First Round
(Switzerland) F Schmid (Switzerland) G Tripet | 21 | 21
(Germany) C Klein (Germany) J Reuther | 12 | 11
(Germany) D Nyenhuis (Germany) P Wachenfeld | 19 | 15
7 | (Poland) L Moren (Poland) W Szkudlarczyk | 21 | 21
(England) M Ellis (Scotland) P Van Rietvelde | 21 | 21
(Germany) M Laibacher (Germany) D Scherpen | 14 | 9
(Ukraine) G Natarov (Ukraine) A Pochtarev | 11 | 14
2 | (Germany) I Kindervater (Germany) J Schöttler | 21 | 21

Second Round
(Switzerland) F Schmid (Switzerland) G Tripet | 13 | 17
7 | (Poland) L Moren (Poland) W Szkudlarczyk | 21 | 21
(England) M Ellis (Scotland) P Van Rietvelde | 17 | 16
2 | (Germany) I Kindervater (Germany) J Schöttler | 21 | 21

Quarterfinals
7 | (Poland) L Moren (Poland) W Szkudlarczyk | 11 | 10
2 | (Germany) I Kindervater (Germany) J Schöttler | 21 | 21

== Women's doubles ==
=== Seeds ===
1. (Singapore) Shinta Mulia Sari / Yao Lei (semi-final)
2. (Malaysia) Vivian Hoo Kah Mun / Woon Khe Wei (quarter-final)
3. (Sweden) Emma Wengberg / Emelie Lennartsson (first round)
4. (Netherlands) Selena Piek / Iris Tabeling (first round)
5. (Scotland) Jillie Cooper / Kirsty Gilmour (second round)
6. (Denmark) Line Damkjaer Kruse / Lena Grebak (withdrew)
7. (Poland) Kamila Augustyn / Agnieszka Wojtkowska (withdrew)
8. (Belgium) Steffi Annys / Severine Corvilain (first round)

=== Finals ===
Semifinals
1 | (Singapore) Shinta Mulia Sari (Singapore) Yao Lei | 18 | 20
(Macau) Wang Rong (Macau) Zhang Zhibo | 21 | 22
(Germany) Birgit Michels (Germany) Johanna Goliszewski | 21 | 21
(Thailand) Patchanut Krajangjit (Thailand) Peeraya Munkitamorn | 12 | 17

Final
(Macau) Wang Rong (Macau) Zhang Zhibo | 21 | 21
(Germany) Birgit Michels (Germany) Johanna Goliszewski | 15 | 13

=== Top half ===
==== Section 1 ====
First Round
1 | (Singapore) S Sari (Singapore) Yao L | 21 | 21
(Germany) N Burger (Germany) A Jungmann | 6 | 2
(Ukraine) Y Kazarinova (Ukraine) N Voytsekh | 17 | 14
(Germany) J Schenk (Netherlands) L Jonathans | 21 | 21
8 | (Belgium) S Annys (Belgium) S Corvilain | 13 | 11
(England) G White (England) L Smith | 21 | 21
Q2 | (Germany) L Kaminski (Germany) T Wurm | 8 | 6
(Netherlands) S Barning (Netherlands) E Muskens | 21 | 21

Second Round
1 | (Singapore) S Sari (Singapore) Yao L | 21 | 21
(Germany) J Schenk (Netherlands) L Jonathans | 15 | 17
(England) G White (England) L Smith | 21 | 21 | 18
(Netherlands) S Barning (Netherlands) E Muskens | 12 | 23 | 21

Quarterfinals
1 | (Singapore) S Sari (Singapore) Yao L | 21 | 21
(Netherlands) S Barning (Netherlands) E Muskens | 17 | 16

==== Section 2 ====
First Round
3 | (Sweden) E Wengberg (Sweden) E Lennartsson | 15 | 21 | 7
(Macau) Wang R (Macau) Zhang ZB | 21 | 16 | 21
(Germany) A Oliva (Slovenia) K Stankovic | 12 | 11
(Germany) I Herttrich (Germany) C Nelte | 21 | 21
PFQ | (Germany) A Horbach (Germany) H Pohl | 12 | 13
(Netherlands) Yao J (Netherlands) I Vaessen | 21 | 21
Q3 | (Bulgaria) P Nedelcheva (Bulgaria) D Popstoikova | 22 | 21
(Ukraine) L Griga (Sweden) A Hogstrom | 20 | 14

Second Round
(Macau) Wang R (Macau) Zhang ZB | 21 | 21
(Germany) I Herttrich (Germany) C Nelte | 16 | 15
(Netherlands) Yao J (Netherlands) I Vaessen | 21 | 18 | 21
Q3 | (Bulgaria) P Nedelcheva (Bulgaria) D Popstoikova | 15 | 21 | 16

Quarterfinals
(Macau) Wang R (Macau) Zhang ZB | 21 | 21
(Netherlands) Yao J (Netherlands) I Vaessen | 10 | 12

=== Bottom half ===
==== Section 3 ====
First Round
(Germany) B Bellenberg (Germany) C Kunzmann | 19 | 12
(Germany) A Hammes (Wales) C Turner | 21 | 21
PFQ | (Germany) E Janssens (Germany) J Kunkel
7 | (Poland) K Augustyn (Poland) A Wojtkowska | wo
(Germany) K Kattenbeck (Germany) I Wienefeld | 21 | 21
Q4 | (Austria) J Lais (Austria) C List | 14 | 15
(Germany) B Michels (Germany) J Goliszewski | 21 | 21
4 | (Netherlands) S Piek (Netherlands) I Tabeling | 18 | 15

Second Round
(Germany) A Hammes (Wales) C Turner | 21 | 21
PFQ | (Germany) E Janssens (Germany) J Kunkel | 9 | 11
(Germany) K Kattenbeck (Germany) I Wienefeld | 15 | 10
(Germany) B Michels (Germany) J Goliszewski | 21 | 21

Quarterfinals
(Germany) A Hammes (Wales) C Turner | 13 | 13
(Germany) B Michels (Germany) J Goliszewski | 21 | 21

==== Section 4 ====
First Round
(Germany) J Bantin (Germany) Y Li | 11 | 14
(Thailand) P Krajangjit (Thailand) P Munkitamorn | 21 | 21
(France) T Vignes Waran (Germany) C Vogelgsang | 13 | 17
5 | (Scotland) J Cooper (Scotland) K Gilmour | 21 | 21
PFQ | (Germany) V Charoloy (Germany) A Dollak | 17 | 22 | 14
(Austria) S Kohlfurst (Austria) N Ziesig | 21 | 20 | 21
BYE
2 | (Malaysia) V Hoo (Malaysia) Woon KW

Second Round
(Thailand) P Krajangjit (Thailand) P Munkitamorn | 16 | 25 | 21
5 | (Scotland) J Cooper (Scotland) K Gilmour | 21 | 23 | 16
(Austria) S Kohlfurst (Austria) N Ziesig | 4 | 21 | 7
2 | (Malaysia) V Hoo (Malaysia) Woon KW | 21 | 16 | 21

Quarterfinals
(Thailand) P Krajangjit (Thailand) P Munkitamorn | 20 | 21 | 21
2 | (Malaysia) V Hoo (Malaysia) Woon KW | 22 | 19 | 13

== Mixed doubles ==
=== Seeds ===
1. (Poland) Robert Mateusiak / Nadiezda Zieba (final)
2. (England) Chris Adcock / (Scotland) Imogen Bankier (withdrew)
3. (Singapore) Danny Bawa Chrisnanta / Vanessa Neo Yu Yan (semi-final)
4. (Germany) Michael Fuchs / Birgit Michels (semi-final)
5. (England) Marcus Ellis / Gabrielle White (first round)
6. (Switzerland) Anthony Dumartheray / Sabrina Jaquet (first round)
7. (Netherlands) Dave Khodabux / Selena Piek (quarter-final)
8. (Denmark) Anders Kristiansen / Julie Houmann (champion)

=== Finals ===
Semifinals
1 | (Poland) Robert Mateusiak (Poland) Nadiezda Zieba | 21 | 21
3 | (Singapore) Danny Bawa Chrisnanta (Singapore) Vanessa Neo Yu Yan | 12 | 19
4 | (Germany) Michael Fuchs (Germany) Birgit Michels | 18 | 21 | 14
8 | (Denmark) Anders Kristiansen (Denmark) Julie Houmann | 21 | 17 | 21

Final
1 | (Poland) Robert Mateusiak (Poland) Nadiezda Zieba | 11 | 16
8 | (Denmark) Anders Kristiansen (Denmark) Julie Houmann | 21 | 21

=== Top half ===
==== Section 1 ====
First Round
1 | (Poland) R Mateusiak (Poland) N Zieba | 21 | 21
(Belgium) F Golinski (Belgium) S Corvilain | 16 | 13
(Germany) R Beck (Germany) A Hammes | 21 | 22
Q4 | (Germany) L Bednorsch (Germany) J Kunkel | 13 | 20
6 | (Switzerland) A Dumartheray (Switzerland) S Jaquet | 14 | 17
(Germany) M Schwenger (Germany) C Nelte | 21 | 21
(Netherlands) J de Ruiter (Netherlands) S Barning | 10 | 21 | 21
(Denmark) A Rasmussen (Denmark) L Grebak | 21 | 15 | 13

Second Round
1 | (Poland) R Mateusiak (Poland) N Zieba | 21 | 21
(Germany) R Beck (Germany) A Hammes | 9 | 9
(Germany) M Schwenger (Germany) C Nelte | 12 | 11
(Netherlands) J de Ruiter (Netherlands) S Barning | 21 | 21

Quarterfinals
1 | (Poland) R Mateusiak (Poland) N Zieba | 21 | 21
(Netherlands) J de Ruiter (Netherlands) S Barning | 16 | 18

==== Section 2 ====
First Round
3 | (Singapore) D Chrisnanta (Singapore) V Neo | 21 | 21
(Germany) M Heumann (Germany) C Kunzmann | 18 | 9
(Scotland) R Blair (Scotland) J Cooper | 22 | 21
(Germany) O Roth (Germany) J Goliszewski | 20 | 18
5 | (England) M Ellis (England) G White | 17 | 21 | 19
(Netherlands) J Maas (Netherlands) I Tabeling | 21 | 19 | 21
(Germany) H Kaesbauer (Germany) K Kattenbeck | 21 | 23 | 21
Q2 | (Germany) M Weisskirchen (Germany) E Janssens | 13 | 25 | 13

Second Round
3 | (Singapore) D Chrisnanta (Singapore) V Neo | 16 | 21 | 21
(Scotland) R Blair (Scotland) J Cooper | 21 | 19 | 17
(Netherlands) J Maas (Netherlands) I Tabeling | 22 | 21
(Germany) H Kaesbauer (Germany) K Kattenbeck | 20 | 14

Quarterfinals
3 | (Singapore) D Chrisnanta (Singapore) V Neo | 21 | 17 | 21
(Netherlands) J Maas (Netherlands) I Tabeling | 13 | 21 | 15

=== Bottom half ===
==== Section 3 ====
First Round
(Republic of Ireland) S Magee (Republic of Ireland) C Magee | 22 | 21
Q1 | (Germany) D Mueller (Germany) T Wurm | 20 | 15
(Poland) W Szkudlarczyk (Poland) A Wojtkowska | 16 | 18
7 | (Netherlands) D Khodabux (Netherlands) S Piek | 21 | 21
(France) S Bourbon (France) J Delaune | 14 | 21 | 16
(Ukraine) G Natarov (Ukraine) Y Kazarinova | 21 | 19 | 21
PFQ | (Germany) A Heinz (Germany) I Wienefeld | 7 | 9
4 | (Germany) M Fuchs (Germany) B Michels | 21 | 21

Second Round
(Republic of Ireland) S Magee (Republic of Ireland) C Magee | wo
7 | (Netherlands) D Khodabux (Netherlands) S Piek
(Ukraine) G Natarov (Ukraine) Y Kazarinova | 18 | 14
4 | (Germany) M Fuchs (Germany) B Michels | 21 | 21

Quarterfinals
7 | (Netherlands) D Khodabux (Netherlands) S Piek | 21 | 19 | 10
4 | (Germany) M Fuchs (Germany) B Michels | 18 | 21 | 21

==== Section 4 ====
First Round
(England) C Langridge (England) H Olver | 21 | 21
(Germany) P Kaesbauer (Germany) I Herttrich | 15 | 12
(Belgium) M Dierickx (Belgium) D Janssens | 10 | 15
8 | (Denmark) A Kristiansen (Denmark) J Houmann | 21 | 21
(Sweden) N Ruponen (Sweden) A Hogstrom | 21 | 16 | 14
Q3 | (Germany) I Kindervater (Germany) H Pohl | 19 | 21 | 21
(Netherlands) J Arends (Netherlands) I Vaessen | 21 | 21
PFQ | (Germany) T Wadenka (Germany) A Oliva | 15 | 17

Second Round
(England) C Langridge (England) H Olver | 21 | 17 | 7
8 | (Denmark) A Kristiansen (Denmark) J Houmann | 18 | 21 | 21
Q3 | (Germany) I Kindervater (Germany) H Pohl | 17 | 21 | 15
(Netherlands) J Arends (Netherlands) I Vaessen | 21 | 14 | 21

Quarterfinals
8 | (Denmark) A Kristiansen (Denmark) J Houmann | 21 | 21
(Netherlands) J Arends (Netherlands) I Vaessen | 11 | 16

| Preceded by 2012 Dutch Open Grand Prix | BWF Grand Prix Gold and Grand Prix; 2012 season | Succeeded by 2012 Macau Open Grand Prix Gold |
