= 2012 Thomas & Uber Cup squads =

This article contains the list for the confirmed squads of badminton's 2012 Thomas & Uber Cup between May 20 and May 27, 2012.

== Thomas Cup ==
=== Group A ===
==== China ====
Name	DoB/Age
Cai Yun	19 January 1980 (aged 32)
Chai Biao	10 October 1990 (aged 21)
Chen Jin	10 January 1986 (aged 26)
Chen Long	18 January 1989 (aged 23)
Du Pengyu	22 January 1988 (aged 24)
Fu Haifeng	23 August 1983 (aged 28)
Guo Zhendong	4 August 1984 (aged 27)
Hong Wei	4 October 1989 (aged 22)
Lin Dan	14 October 1983 (aged 28)
Shen Ye	11 March 1987 (aged 25)

==== Indonesia ====
Name	DoB/Age
Mohammad Ahsan	7 September 1987 (aged 24)
Alvent Yulianto Chandra	11 July 1980 (aged 31)
Taufik Hidayat	10 August 1981 (aged 30)
Markis Kido	11 August 1984 (aged 27)
Dionysius Hayom Rumbaka	22 October 1988 (aged 23)
Simon Santoso	29 July 1985 (aged 26)
Rian Agung Saputro	25 June 1990 (aged 21)
Bona Septano	22 September 1987 (aged 24)
Hendra Setiawan	25 August 1984 (aged 27)
Tommy Sugiarto	31 May 1988 (aged 23)

==== England ====
Name	DoB/Age
Chris Adcock	27 April 1989 (aged 23)
Carl Baxter	28 November 1985 (aged 26)
Ben Beckman	15 December 1987 (aged 24)
Andrew Ellis	21 January 1987 (aged 25)
Chris Langridge	2 May 1985 (aged 27)
Peter Mills	31 March 1988 (aged 24)
Rajiv Ouseph	30 August 1986 (aged 25)
Toby Penty	12 August 1992 (aged 19)
Nathan Robertson	30 May 1977 (aged 34)

== Uber Cup ==
=== Group A ===
==== China ====
Name	DoB/Age
Cheng Shu	11 July 1987 (aged 24)
Li Xuerui	24 January 1991 (aged 21)
Pan Pan	27 April 1986 (aged 26)
Tian Qing	19 August 1986 (aged 25)
Wang Shixian	13 January 1990 (aged 22)
Wang Xiaoli	24 June 1989 (aged 22)
Wang Xin	10 November 1985 (aged 26)
Wang Yihan	18 January 1988 (aged 24)
Yu Yang	7 April 1986 (aged 26)
Zhao Yunlei	25 August 1986 (aged 25)

==== Indonesia ====
Name	DoB/Age
Anneke Feinya Agustin	11 August 1991 (aged 20)
Suci Rizki Andini	26 March 1993 (aged 19)
Lindaweni Fanetri	18 January 1990 (aged 22)
Adriyanti Firdasari	16 December 1986 (aged 25)
Della Destiara Haris	8 December 1992 (aged 19)
Meiliana Jauhari	7 May 1984 (aged 28)
Maria Febe Kusumastuti	30 September 1989 (aged 22)
Nitya Krishinda Maheswari	16 December 1988 (aged 23)
Bellaetrix Manuputty	11 October 1988 (aged 23)
Greysia Polii	11 August 1987 (aged 24)

==== South Africa ====
Name	DoB/Age
Stacey Doubell	23 March 1987 (aged 25)
Michelle Edwards	11 July 1974 (aged 37)
Kerry-Lee Harrington	21 March 1986 (aged 26)
Annari Viljoen	16 January 1987 (aged 25)

== Teams with Thomas and Uber Cup squads ==
=== Denmark ===
Men

- Peter Gade
- Jan O Jorgensen
- Viktor Axelsen
- Hans-Kristian Vittinghus
- Mathias Boe
- Carsten Mogensen
- Jonas Rasmussen
- Joachim Fischer Nielsen
- Mads Conrad-Petersen
- Mads Pieler Kolding

Women

- Tine Baun
- Karina Jørgensen
- Line Kjaersfeldt
- Lene Clausen
- Christinna Pedersen
- Kamilla Rytter Juhl
- Line Damkjaer Kruse
- Maria Helsbol
- Marie Roepke

=== Germany ===
Men

- Marc Zwiebler
- Dieter Domke
- Lukas Schmidt
- Marcel Reuter
- Ingo Kindervater
- Johannes Schoettler
- Michael Fuchs
- Oliver Roth
- Peter Kaesbauer
- Josche Zurwonne

Women

- Juliane Schenk
- Karin Schnaase
- Olga Konon
- Fabienne Deprez
- Birgit Michels
- Johanna Goliszewski
- Sandra Marinello
- Carola Bott
- Carla Nelte
- Isabel Herttrich

=== Japan ===
Men

- Sho Sasaki
- Kenichi Tago
- Takuma Ueda
- Riichi Takeshita
- Noriyasu Hirata
- Hirokatsu Hashimoto
- Hiroyuki Endo
- Kenichi Hayakawa
- Naoki Kawamae
- Shoji Sato

Women

- Sayaka Sato
- Eriko Hirose
- Minatsu Mitani
- Ai Goto
- Mizuki Fujii
- Reika Kakiiwa
- Mami Naito
- Shizuka Matsuo
- Misaki Matsutomo
- Ayaka Takahashi

=== South Korea ===
Men

- Lee Hyun-il
- Shon Wan-ho
- Lee Dong-keun
- Hong Ji-hoon
- Jung Jae-sung
- Lee Yong-dae
- Ko Sung-Hyun
- Yoo Yeon-seong
- Kim Ki-jung
- Kim Sa-rang

Women

- Sung Ji-hyun
- Bae Youn-joo
- Hwang Hye-youn
- Kim Soo-jin
- Ha Jung-eun
- Kim Min-jung
- Jung Kyung-eun
- Kim Ha-na
- Eom Hye-won
- Jang Ye-na

=== South Africa ===
Men

- Dorian James
- Jacob Maliekal
- Willem Viljoen
- Prakash Vijayanath

=== United States ===
Men

- Sattawat Pongnairat
- Howard Shu
- Nicholas Jinadasa
- Tony Gunawan
- Howard Bach
- Phillip Chew

Women

- Jamie Subandhi
- Eva Lee
- Paula Lynn Obanana
- Iris Wang
- Rena Wang

== Teams with Thomas Cup squad only ==
=== Malaysia ===
- Lee Chong Wei
- Daren Liew
- Muhammad Hafiz Hashim
- Chong Wei Feng
- Koo Kien Keat
- Tan Boon Heong
- Goh V Shem
- Lim Khim Wah
- Hoon Thien How
- Tan Wee Kiong

=== New Zealand ===
- James Eunson
- Michael Fowke
- Luke Charlesworth
- Kevin Dennerly-Minturn
- Oliver Leydon-Davis

=== Russia ===
- Vladimir Ivanov
- Ivan Sozonov
- Vladimir Malkov
- Anatoliy Yartsev
- Denis Grachev
- Vitaliy Durkin
- Alexandr Nikolaenko
- Evgeniy Dremin
- Sergey Lunev

== Teams with Uber Cup squad only ==
=== Australia ===
- Victoria Na
- Renuga Veeran
- Tara Pilven
- Wendy Chen Hsuan-yu
- Leanne Choo
- Tang Hetian
- Eugenia Tanaka
- Jacqueline Guan
- Gronya Somerville

=== Chinese Taipei ===
- Tai Tzu-ying
- Pai Hsiao-ma
- Hung Shih-han
- Cheng Wen-hsing
- Chien Yu-chin
- Wang Pei-rong
- Hsieh Pei-chen
- Tsai Pei-ling
- Chiang Kai-hsin

=== Netherlands ===
- Yao Jie
- Judith Meulendijks
- Patty Stolzenbach
- Josephine Wentholt
- Selena Piek
- Iris Tabeling
- Eefje Muskens
- Samantha Barning
- Ilse Vaessen
- Paulien van Dooremalen

=== Thailand ===
- Ratchanok Inthanon
- Porntip Buranaprasertsuk
- Sapsiree Taerattanachai
- Nichaon Jindapon
- Kunchala Voravichitchaikul
- Duanganong Aroonkesorn
- Saralee Thoungthongkam
- Savitree Amitrapai
