= 2007 European Junior Badminton Championships – Girls' doubles =

- Venue: Hermann-Neuberger-Halle
- Location: Völklingen, Germany
- Dates: 4 April 2007 – 8 April 2007
- Competitors: 84 from 28 nations

Medalists
gold medal	Olga Konon	Belarus
gold medal	Kristína Ludíková	Czech Republic
silver medal	Joan Christiansen; Line Damkjær Kruse	Denmark
bronze medal	Gabrielle White; Mariana Agathangelou	England
bronze medal	Samantha Ward; Sarah Walker	England

The girls' doubles tournament of the 2007 European Junior Badminton Championships was held from 4 to 8 April 2007. Nina Vislova and Olga Kolzova from Russia clinched this title in the last edition.

== Seeds ==
Click on the seed number of a player to go to their draw section.

1. (England) Gabrielle White / Mariana Agathangelou (semi-finals)
2. (Denmark) Joan Christiansen / Line Damkjær Kruse (final)
3. (Netherlands) Samantha Barning / Patty Stolzenbach (second round)
4. (Denmark) Maria Thorberg / Maja Bech (quarter-finals)

5. (Russia) Luboov Chudentceva / Victoria Slobodyanyuk (third round)
6. (Poland) Marlena Flis / Natalia Pocztowiak (quarter-finals)
7. (Belarus) Olga Konon / (Czech Republic) Kristína Ludíková (champions)
8. (England) Samantha Ward / Sarah Walker (semi-finals)

== Draw ==
=== Finals ===
Semi-finals
1	(England) Gabrielle White (England) Mariana Agathangelou	20	12
5/8	(Belarus) Olga Konon (Czech Republic) Kristína Ludíková	22	21
5/8	(England) Samantha Ward (England) Sarah Walker	14	15
2	(Denmark) Joan Christiansen (Denmark) Line Damkjær Kruse	21	21

Final
5/8	(Belarus) Olga Konon (Czech Republic) Kristína Ludíková	21	21
2	(Denmark) Joan Christiansen (Denmark) Line Damkjær Kruse	14	7

=== Top half ===
==== Section 1 ====
First Round
(Czech Republic) Š Křížková (Czech Republic) D Koukalová	21	21
(Finland) T Vikman (Finland) N Vainio	11	12
(Italy) A Tiburzi (Italy) I Tomio	9	13
(Sweden) S Ekberg (Sweden) L Hedberg	21	21

Second Round
1	(England) G White (England) M Agathangelou	21	21
(Netherlands) I Tabeling (Netherlands) S Piek	15	15
(Scotland) G Sloan (Scotland) C Lawlor	8	17
(Czech Republic) Š Křížková (Czech Republic) D Koukalová	21	21
5/8; SUB	(Russia) L Chudentceva (Russia) V Slobodyanyuk	25	9	22
(Belgium) S Corvilain (Belgium) L Tan	23	21	20
(Turkey) N Ekin (Turkey) R Kemer	9	11
(Sweden) S Ekberg (Sweden) L Hedberg	21	21

Third Round
1	(England) G White (England) M Agathangelou	21	21
(Czech Republic) Š Křížková (Czech Republic) D Koukalová	13	13
5/8; SUB	(Russia) L Chudentceva (Russia) V Slobodyanyuk	18	18
(Sweden) S Ekberg (Sweden) L Hedberg	21	21

Quarter-finals
1	(England) G White (England) M Agathangelou	21	21
(Sweden) S Ekberg (Sweden) L Hedberg	15	16

==== Section 2 ====
First Round
(Iceland) H R Matthíasdóttir (Iceland) H M Guðbjartsdóttir	13	15
(France) S Callon (France) É Lefel	21	21
(Ukraine) M Martynenko (Ukraine) V Pogrebnyak	21	21
(Poland) M Grządzielska (Poland) A Narel	17	13
(Switzerland) F Spühler (Switzerland) C Hantz	15	18
(Lithuania) O Jacuk (Lithuania) G Voitechovskaja	21	21

Second Round
3/4	(Denmark) M Thorberg (Denmark) M Bech	21	21
(Estonia) G Saar (Estonia) K Freirik	11	7
(Germany) D Kaufhold (Germany) L Deichgräber	21	23	18
(France) S Callon (France) É Lefel	17	25	21
5/8	(Belarus) O Konon (Czech Republic) K Ludíková	21	21
(Bulgaria) B Maneva (Bulgaria) P Neykova	3	11
(Ukraine) M Martynenko (Ukraine) V Pogrebnyak	21	21
(Lithuania) O Jacuk (Lithuania) G Voitechovskaja	7	12

Third Round
3/4	(Denmark) M Thorberg (Denmark) M Bech	21	21
(France) S Callon (France) É Lefel	16	16
5/8	(Belarus) O Konon (Czech Republic) K Ludíková	21	20	21
(Ukraine) M Martynenko (Ukraine) V Pogrebnyak	7	22	13

Quarter-finals
3/4	(Denmark) M Thorberg (Denmark) M Bech	21	12	20
5/8	(Belarus) O Konon (Czech Republic) K Ludíková	19	21	22

=== Bottom half ===
==== Section 3 ====
First Round
(Sweden) J Karlsson (Sweden) A Högström
(Estonia) L Vana (Estonia) K Hőim	w	/	o
(Turkey) Ö Çalışkan (Turkey) E Epice	16	21	21
(Austria) E Baldauf (Austria) I Freimüller	21	10	16
(Luxembourg) D Schümmer (Luxembourg) Z Schroeder	8	10
(Bulgaria) D Popstoikova (Bulgaria) G Banova	21	21

Second Round
(Estonia) L Vana (Estonia) K Hőim	17	19
(Turkey) Ö Çalışkan (Turkey) E Epice	21	21
(Slovenia) T Delak (Slovenia) N Koncut	21	8
5/8	(England) S Ward (England) S Walker	23	21
(Bulgaria) D Popstoikova (Bulgaria) G Banova	23	21	21
(Croatia) S Poznanović (Croatia) I Majstorović	25	8	18
(Scotland) J Cooper (Scotland) L Sloan	21	21
3/4	(Netherlands) S Barning (Netherlands) P Stolzenbach	18	19

Third Round
(Turkey) Ö Çalışkan (Turkey) E Epice	25	15	16
5/8	(England) S Ward (England) S Walker	23	21	21
(Bulgaria) D Popstoikova (Bulgaria) G Banova	11	17
(Scotland) J Cooper (Scotland) L Sloan	21	21

Quarter-finals
5/8	(England) S Ward (England) S Walker	18	21	21
(Scotland) J Cooper (Scotland) L Sloan	21	15	12

==== Section 4 ====
First Round
(Spain) S Chirlaque (Spain) L Molina	21	21
(France) M Maunoury (France) S Sicard	19	17
(Switzerland) J Ling (Switzerland) T Pelling	21	16	21
(Germany) J Schmidt (Germany) M Reich	17	21	15

Second Round
(Spain) S Chirlaque (Spain) L Molina	21	21
(Hungary) Z Horváth (Hungary) Z Bánhegyi	4	14
(Slovakia) A Starostova (Slovakia) M Fašungová
5/8	(Poland) M Flis (Poland) N Pocztowiak	w	/	o
(Switzerland) J Ling (Switzerland) T Pelling	10	21	18
(Russia) K Polikarpova (Russia) A Panushkina	21	11	21
(Ukraine) O Chkheidze (Ukraine) O Mashchenko	13	9
2	(Denmark) J Christiansen (Denmark) L D Kruse	21	21

Third Round
(Spain) S Chirlaque (Spain) L Molina	12	21	14
5/8	(Poland) M Flis (Poland) N Pocztowiak	21	18	21
(Russia) K Polikarpova (Russia) A Panushkina	13	13
2	(Denmark) J Christiansen (Denmark) L D Kruse	21	21

Quarter-finals
5/8	(Poland) M Flis (Poland) N Pocztowiak	12	21	18
2	(Denmark) J Christiansen (Denmark) L D Kruse	21	15	21
