= 2007 European Junior Badminton Championships – Girls' singles =

- Venue: Hermann-Neuberger-Halle
- Location: Völklingen, Germany
- Dates: 4 April 2007 – 8 April 2007
- Competitors: 64 from 30 nations

Medalists
| gold medal | Karina Jørgensen | Denmark |
| silver medal | Michelle Cheung | England |
| bronze medal | Olga Konon | Belarus |
| bronze medal | Patty Stolzenbach | Netherlands |

The girls' singles tournament of the 2007 European Junior Badminton Championships was held from 4 to 8 April 2007. Janet Köhler from Germany clinched this title in the last edition.

== Seeds ==
Click on the seed number of a player to go to their draw section.

1. (Denmark) Karina Jørgensen (champion)
2. (England) Michelle Cheung (final)
3. (Ukraine) Mariya Martynenko (first round)
4. (Netherlands) Patty Stolzenbach (semi-finals)
5. (Denmark) Anne Hald Jensen (second round)
6. (Czech Republic) Kristína Ludíková (quarter-finals)
7. (Republic of Ireland) Chloe Magee (second round)
8. (Scotland) Linda Sloan (quarter-finals)

9. (Bulgaria) Gabriela Banova (quarter-finals)
10. (Turkey) Ezgi Epice (second round)
11. (Spain) Laura Molina (second round)
12. (Russia) Ksenia Polikarpova (second round)
13. (Germany) Mona Reich (third round)
14. (Russia) Victoria Slobodyanyuk (first round)
15. (Belgium) Lianne Tan (third round)
16. (Netherlands) Yik-Man Wong (third round)

== Draw ==
=== Finals ===
Semi-finals
1 | (Denmark) Karina Jørgensen | 21 | 21
(Belarus) Olga Konon | 14 | 18
3/4 | (Netherlands) Patty Stolzenbach | 15 | 18
2 | (England) Michelle Cheung | 21 | 21

Final
1 | (Denmark) Karina Jørgensen | 13 | 21 | 24
2 | (England) Michelle Cheung | 21 | 12 | 22

=== Top half ===
==== Section 1 ====
First Round
1 | (Denmark) K Jørgensen | 21 | 22
(Switzerland) C Hantz | 9 | 20
(Switzerland) T Pelling | 18 | 21 | 21
(Bulgaria) B Manevag | 21 | 18 | 6
9/16 | (Spain) L Molina | 21 | 21
(Lithuania) G Voitechovskaja | 9 | 8
(Slovenia) N Koncut | 16 | 14
(Bulgaria) D Popstoikova | 21 | 21
5/8 | (Scotland) L Sloan | 21 | 21
(England) K Robertshaw | 17 | 11
(Sweden) A Högström
(Netherlands) S Piek | w | / | o
9/16 | (Netherlands) Y-M Wong | 16 | 21 | 21
(France) M Maunoury | 21 | 19 | 12
(England) S Walker | 11 | 16
(Poland) A Narel | 21 | 21

Second Round
1 | (Denmark) K Jørgensen | 21 | 21
(Switzerland) T Pelling | 11 | 11
9/16 | (Spain) L Molina | 24 | 21 | 21
(Bulgaria) D Popstoikova | 26 | 10 | 23
5/8 | (Scotland) L Sloan | 21 | 21
(Netherlands) S Piek | 8 | 12
9/16 | (Netherlands) Y-M Wong | 22 | 21
(Poland) A Narel | 20 | 19

Third Round
1 | (Denmark) K Jørgensen | 18 | 21 | 21
(Bulgaria) D Popstoikova | 21 | 16 | 8
5/8 | (Scotland) L Sloan | 21 | 21
9/16 | (Netherlands) Y-M Wong | 17 | 11

Quarter-finals
1 | (Denmark) K Jørgensen | 21 | 21
5/8 | (Scotland) L Sloan | 18 | 19

==== Section 2 ====
First Round
3/4 | (Ukraine) M Martynenko | 21 | 15 | 21
(Germany) N Voigt | 19 | 21 | 23
(Slovakia) Z Orlovská | 21 | 21
(Estonia) K Freirik | 15 | 10
9/16 | (Russia) K Polikarpova | 21 | 21
(Croatia) P Petranović | 7 | 8
(Belarus) O Konon | 21 | 21
(Wales) C Harvey | 14 | 9
5/8 | (Czech Republic) K Ludíková | 21 | 21
(Bulgaria) P Neykova | 8 | 6
(Austria) B Heber | 12 | 7
(Netherlands) E Muskens | 21 | 21
9/16 | (Turkey) E Epice | 21 | 21
(Finland) N Vainio | 16 | 17
(Estonia) L Vana | 10 | 21 | 20
(Germany) L Deichgräber | 21 | 18 | 22

Second Round
(Germany) N Voigt | 21 | 21
(Slovakia) Z Orlovská | 18 | 17
9/16 | (Russia) K Polikarpova | 21 | 15 | 10
(Belarus) O Konon | 16 | 21 | 21
5/8 | (Czech Republic) K Ludíková | 21 | 21
(Netherlands) E Muskens | 12 | 13
9/16 | (Turkey) E Epice | 21 | 12 | 10
(Germany) L Deichgräber | 18 | 21 | 21

Third Round
(Germany) N Voigt | 9 | 14
(Belarus) O Konon | 21 | 21
5/8 | (Czech Republic) K Ludíková | 21 | 17 | 21
(Germany) L Deichgräber | 14 | 21 | 16

Quarter-finals
(Belarus) O Konon | 16 | 21 | 21
5/8 | (Czech Republic) K Ludíková | 21 | 16 | 19

=== Bottom half ===
==== Section 3 ====
First Round
(France) S Sicard | 10 | 19
(Sweden) J Karlsson | 21 | 21
(Luxembourg) C Barnig | 12 | 11
9/16 | (Bulgaria) G Banova | 21 | 21
(Turkey) Ö Çalışkan | 21 | 21
(Scotland) C Lawlor | 11 | 10
(Russia) L Chudentcevc | 13 | 9
5/8 | (Republic of Ireland) C Magee | 21 | 21
(Austria) M Mathis | 19 | 21 | 15
(Estonia) K Hõim | 21 | 19 | 21
(Finland) T Vikman | 10 | 14
9/16 | (Germany) M Reich | 21 | 21
(Sweden) S Ekberg | 21 | 16 | 15
(Spain) S Chirlaque | 15 | 21 | 21
(Czech Republic) E Maixnerová | 18 | 13
3/4 | (Netherlands) P Stolzenbach | 21 | 21

Second Round
(Sweden) J Karlsson | 11 | 10
9/16 | (Bulgaria) G Banova | 21 | 21
(Turkey) Ö Çalışkan | 21 | 8 | 21
5/8 | (Republic of Ireland) C Magee | 13 | 21 | 14
(Estonia) K Hõim | 20 | 19
9/16 | (Germany) M Reich | 22 | 21
(Spain) S Chirlaque | 13 | 13
3/4 | (Netherlands) P Stolzenbach | 21 | 21

Third Round
9/16 | (Bulgaria) G Banova | 21 | 21
(Turkey) Ö Çalışkan | 15 | 8
9/16 | (Germany) M Reich | 14 | 6
3/4 | (Netherlands) P Stolzenbach | 21 | 21

Quarter-finals
9/16 | (Bulgaria) G Banova | 20 | 12
3/4 | (Netherlands) P Stolzenbach | 22 | 21

==== Section 4 ====
First Round
(Croatia) I Majstorović | 10 | 19
(Italy) I Tomio | 21 | 21
(Czech Republic) D Koukalová | 12 | 21 | 21
9/16 | (Russia) V Slobodyanyuk | 21 | 14 | 9
(Sweden) L Hedberg | 21 | 21
(Switzerland) J Ling | 14 | 18
(England) L Cousins | 19 | 18
5/8 | (Denmark) A Hald Jensen | 21 | 21
(Ukraine) O Mashchenko | 21 | 21
(Hungary) Z Bánhegyi | 12 | 8
(Poland) N Pocztowiak | 14 | 10
9/16 | (Belgium) L Tan | 21 | 21
(Germany) C Nelte | 21 | 21
(Iceland) H M Guðbjartsdóttir | 18 | 14
(Russia) A Panushkina | 11 | 14
2 | (England) M Cheung | 21 | 21

Second Round
(Italy) I Tomio | 6 | 14
(Czech Republic) D Koukalová | 21 | 21
(Sweden) L Hedberg | w | / | o
5/8 | (Denmark) A Hald Jensen
(Ukraine) O Mashchenko | 21 | 17 | 11
9/16 | (Belgium) L Tan | 18 | 21 | 21
(Germany) C Nelte | 4 | 10
2 | (England) M Cheung | 21 | 21

Third Round
(Czech Republic) D Koukalová | 21 | 21
(Sweden) L Hedberg | 10 | 17
9/16 | (Belgium) L Tan | 14 | 18
2 | (England) M Cheung | 21 | 21

Quarter-finals
(Czech Republic) D Koukalová | 10 | 16
2 | (England) M Cheung | 21 | 21
