= 2007 European Junior Badminton Championships =

Tournament details
- Dates: 31 March – 8 April 2007
- Venue: Hermann-Neuberger-Halle
- Location: Völklingen, Saarland, Saarbrücken, Germany

The 2007 European Junior Badminton Championships were held in Hermann-Neuberger-Halle, Völklingen town, Saarbrücken district, Germany, between 31 March and 8 April 2007.

== Medal summary ==
=== Medalists ===
Event	Gold	Silver	Bronze
Boys' singles	(Denmark) Mads Conrad-Petersen	(Sweden) Gabriel Ulldahl	(Spain) Ernesto Velázquez
Boys' singles	(Denmark) Mads Conrad-Petersen	(Sweden) Gabriel Ulldahl	(Netherlands) Lester Oey
Girls' singles	(Denmark) Karina Jørgensen	(England) Michelle Cheung	(Belarus) Olga Konon
Girls' singles	(Denmark) Karina Jørgensen	(England) Michelle Cheung	(Netherlands) Patty Stolzenbach
Boys' doubles	(England) Chris Adcock (England) Peter Mills	(Denmark) Mads Conrad-Petersen (Denmark) Mads Pieler Kolding	(Denmark) Christian Larsen (Denmark) Christian John Skovgaard
Boys' doubles	(England) Chris Adcock (England) Peter Mills	(Denmark) Mads Conrad-Petersen (Denmark) Mads Pieler Kolding	(Germany) Peter Käsbauer (Germany) Lukas Schmidt
Girls' doubles	(Belarus) Olga Konon (Czech Republic) Kristína Ludíková	(Denmark) Joan Christiansen (Denmark) Line Damkjær Kruse	(England) Gabrielle White (England) Mariana Agathangelou
Girls' doubles	(Belarus) Olga Konon (Czech Republic) Kristína Ludíková	(Denmark) Joan Christiansen (Denmark) Line Damkjær Kruse	(England) Samantha Ward (England) Sarah Walker
Mixed doubles	(Denmark) Christian Larsen (Denmark) Joan Christiansen	(Germany) Peter Käsbauer (Germany) Julia Schmidt	(Denmark) Mads Pieler Kolding (Denmark) Line Damkjær Kruse
Mixed doubles	(Denmark) Christian Larsen (Denmark) Joan Christiansen	(Germany) Peter Käsbauer (Germany) Julia Schmidt	(Denmark) Mikkel Elbjørn (Denmark) Maja Bech
Mixed team	England Bruce Peake, Chris Adcock, Chris Hotchen, Gabrielle White, Jamie Bonsels, Kate Robertshaw, Laura Cousins, Marcus Ellis, Mariana Agathangelou, Michelle Cheung, Peter Mills, Robert Kettle, Samantha Ward, Sarah Walker, Victor Liew	Netherlands Eefje Muskens, Iris Tabeling, Jacco Arends, Jelle Maas, Jordy Hilbink, Lester Oey, Patty Stolzenbach, Quintus Thies, Samantha Barning, Selena Piek, Stephen Branderhorst, Yik-Man Wong	Denmark Anne Hald Jensen, Camilla Overgaard, Christian Larsen, Christian John Skovgaard, Dennis Prehn, Joan Christiansen, Karina Jørgensen, Line Damkjær Kruse, Mads Conrad-Petersen, Mads Pieler Kolding, Maja Bech, Maria Thorberg, Martin Kragh, Mikkel Elbjørn

=== Medal table ===
* Host nation (Germany)

Rank	Nation	Gold	Silver	Bronze	Total
1	Denmark	3	2	4	9
2	England	2	1	2	5
3	Belarus	0.5	0	1	1.5
4	Czech Republic	0.5	0	0	0.5
5	Netherlands	0	1	2	3
6	Germany*	0	1	1	2
7	Sweden	0	1	0	1
8	Spain	0	0	1	1
Totals (8 entries)		6	6	11	23
