= Ellen Kooijman =

Dutch geoscientist

Ellen Kooijman is a Dutch geoscientist specializing in mineralogy, geology, and geochemistry. She holds a master's degree in Earth science from Utrecht University and a doctorate in geochemistry from the University of Münster. She is the Head of the Department of Geosciences at the Swedish Museum of Natural History and Director of the NordSIMS-Vegacenter. Kooijman is also known for designing the LEGO Research Institute set, which featured women in STEM.

== Early life ==
Kooijman was raised in Gouda, the Netherlands. She studied geosciences at university, aiming to "combine physics, mathematics, and chemistry to understand the Earth".

Kooijman wrote her dissertation at the Institute for Mineralogy, located at the University of Münster.

== Education ==
Kooijman earned a Master of Science in Earth Science from Utrecht University in the Netherlands. She later obtained a Doctorate in Geochemistry from the University of Münster in Germany, supervised by geochemist Klaus Mezger. Her doctoral research focused on Uranium-lead (U–Pb) dating of zircon and rutile using laser ablation inductively coupled plasma mass spectrometry (LA-ICP-MS).

== Career ==
After completing her doctorate, she remained at Münster for a year as a postdoctoral researcher before working as an assistant professional researcher at the University of California, Santa Barbara for several years, continuing her work with LA-ICP-MS. In 2013, Kooijman began working at the Swedish Museum of Natural History as a senior researcher. She is currently the Head of the Department of Geosciences and the Director of the NordSIMS-Vegacenter, a merged laboratory funded by the Swedish Research Council. Kooijman has over 130 publications in mineralogy, petrology, and geochemistry.

Under the alias "Alatariel," she created the LEGO Research Institute set, which depicted women in STEM roles as minifigures: astronomer, chemist, and paleontologist. Kooijman also collaborated on the LEGO Big Bang Theory set, highlighting scientist characters from the sitcom, and co-designed the Amelia Earhart Tribute set with Brad Meltzer, inspired by the historical aviator.

=== Publications ===
As of September 2024, Kooijman is actively conducting research in the geosciences, with recent co-authored articles including "Origin and Affinities of the Malmberget Iron Oxide-Apatite Deposit, Northern Sweden: Insights From Magnetite Chemistry and Fe-O Isotopes", "Late Cretaceous and Early Paleogene Fluid Circulation and Microbial Activity in Deep Fracture Networks of the Precambrian Basement of Western Greenland", and "A common precursor for global hotspot lavas".

== Awards ==
- 2010 Young Scientist Outstanding Poster Paper (YSOPP) Award
