= Olga Roj =

Belarusian-German badminton player (born 1989)

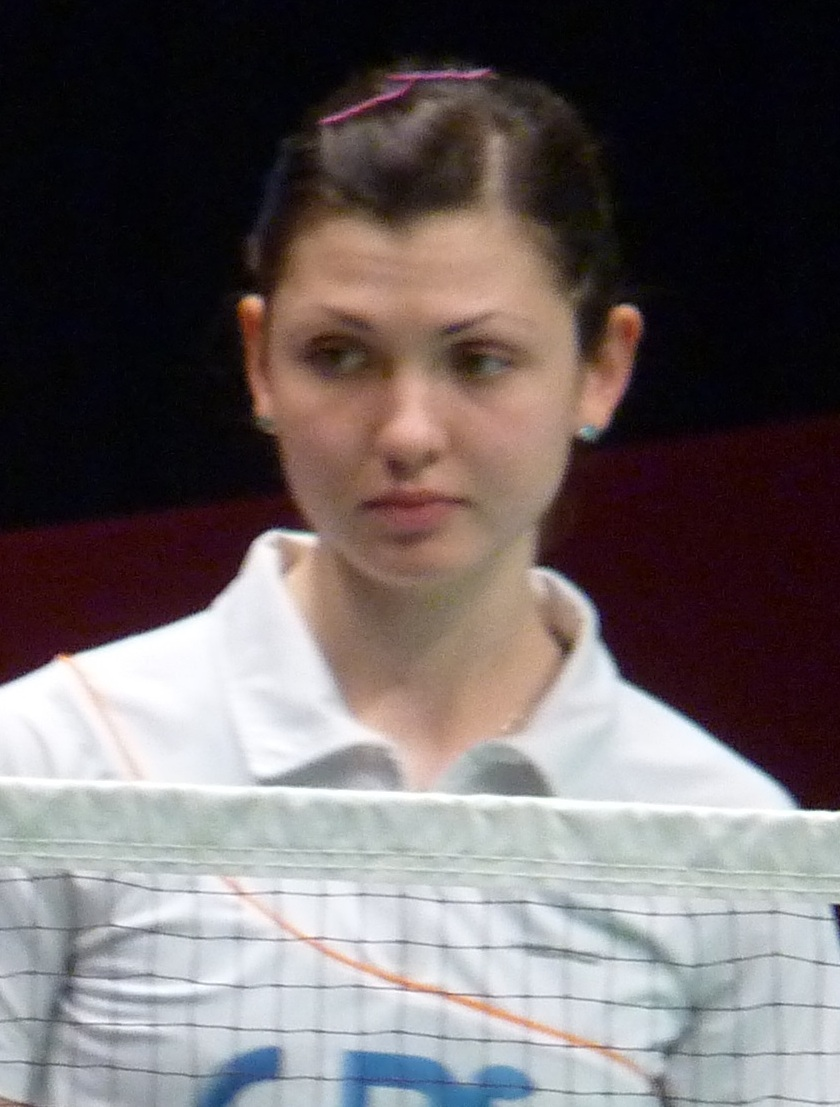
- Roj at the 2010 Dutch Open

Personal information
- Full name: Olga Anatolyevna Roj
- Born: Olga Anatolyevna Konon; 11 November 1989 (age 37) Brest, Byelorussian SSR
- Height: 1.71 m (5 ft 7 in)
- Weight: 61 kg (134 lb; 9.6 st)
- Spouse: Alen Roj (m. 2018)

Sport
- Country: Belarus (to 2009); Poland (2009–2010); Germany (since October 2010)
- Sport: Badminton
- Handedness: Right
- Retired: 30 August 2018

Women's singles & doubles
- Highest ranking: 26 (WS, 18 August 2011); 90 (WD, 12 July 2018); 40 (XD, 27 September 2018)
- BWF profile
Medal record
Women's badminton
Representing Germany
European Mixed Team Championships
Gold medal – first place	2013 Moscow	Mixed Team
European Women's Team Championships
Gold medal – first place	2012 Amsterdam	Women's team
Silver medal – second place	2018 Kazan	Women's team
Bronze medal – third place	2014 Basel	Women's team
Representing Belarus
European Junior Championships
Gold medal – first place	2007 Völklingen	Girls' doubles
Bronze medal – third place	2005 Den Bosch	Girls' doubles
Bronze medal – third place	2007 Völklingen	Girls' singles

Olga Anatolyevna Roj (Note: Belarusian: Вольга Анатольеўна Конан; Russian: Ольга Анатольевна Конон) (née Konon; born 11 November 1989) is a badminton player from Germany, and is of Belarusian origin.

== Career ==
Konon is known for her speed and attacking style of play. She was coached by Kim Ji-hyun and Per Henrik Croona. Konon won her first major international tournament in 2004, at the Finnish International in the mixed event. She was only 14 at the time.

In 2005, she traveled to the north east of England to take on then county champions, mixed doubles team Andrew Dodds and Cheryl Wigham. Konon and her partner were beaten 21–9, 21–14.

In her next match she suffered a knee ligament injury at the Swedish International. After this injury, in 2007, she won a gold medal in girls' doubles and a bronze medal in girls' singles at the European Junior Championships. The following year she won Le Volant d'Or de Toulouse in women's singles, and qualified for the 2008 Summer Olympics.

In October 2014, the UK launched the National Badminton League. This consists of six national teams that play each other once during the season. Top national and European players were 'auctioned' off and bought by one of the six franchises, and Konon was picked to play for the University of Nottingham. In November 2014, she won her first match for the UON, beating Liz Cann 3–0.

=== Summer Olympics ===
At the 2008 Summer Olympics in Beijing, Konon lost in the round of sixteen to top seeded Xie Xingfang (who later won the silver medal) 21–16, 21–15. En route to the round of sixteen, she defeated Singapore's Xing Aiying, who is ranked 23 in the world, 21–19, 21–12. Later in the round of 32, she beat Slovenia's Maja Tvrdy, 21–17, 21–14.

== Achievements ==
=== European Junior Championships ===
Girls' singles
Year	Venue	Opponent	Score	Result
2007	Hermann-Neuberger-Halle; Völklingen, Germany	(Denmark) Karina Jørgensen	14–21, 18–21	Bronze

Girls' doubles
Year	Venue	Partner	Opponent	Score	Result
2005	De Maaspoort; Den Bosch, Netherlands	(Czech Republic) Kristína Ludíková	(Russia) Olga Kozlova (Russia) Nina Vislova	5–15, 12–15	Bronze
2007	Hermann-Neuberger-Halle; Völklingen, Germany	(Czech Republic) Kristína Ludíková	(Denmark) Joan Christiansen (Denmark) Line Damkjær Kruse	21–14, 21–17	Gold

=== BWF World Tour ===
The BWF World Tour, which was announced on 19 March 2017 and implemented in 2018, is a series of elite badminton tournaments sanctioned by the Badminton World Federation (BWF). The BWF World Tours are divided into levels of World Tour Finals, Super 1000, Super 750, Super 500, Super 300 (part of the HSBC World Tour), and the BWF Tour Super 100.

Mixed doubles
Year	Tournament	Level	Partner	Opponent	Score	Result
2018	Orléans Masters	Super 100	(Germany) Peter Käsbauer	(Denmark) Niclas Nøhr (Denmark) Sara Thygesen	19–21, 9–21	(silver) Runner-up

=== BWF International Challenge/Series/European Circuit ===
Women's singles
Year	Tournament	Opponent	Score	Result
2007	White Nights	(Japan) Kanako Yonekura	11–21, 7–21	(silver) Runner-up
2008	Le Volant d'Or de Toulouse	(Scotland) Susan Hughes	21–18, 21–12	(gold) Winner
2010	Norwegian International	(Ukraine) Larisa Griga	21–17, 21–7	(gold) Winner
2010	Italian International	(Spain) Carolina Marín	22–20, 21–14	(gold) Winner
2011	Spanish Open	(Spain) Carolina Marín	13–21, 14–21	(silver) Runner-up
2011	Kharkiv International	(Scotland) Susan Egelstaff	21–9, 21–10	(gold) Winner
2011	Belgian International	(Ukraine) Larisa Griga	21–12, 21–13	(gold) Winner
2013	French International	(Spain) Beatriz Corrales	18–21, 15–21	(silver) Runner-up
2013	Denmark International	(Denmark) Mette Poulsen	21–15, 21–10	(gold) Winner
2013	White Nights	(Russia) Ella Diehl	21–17, 21–14	(gold) Winner
2015	Kharkiv International	(Thailand) Pornpawee Chochuwong	21–16, 21–10	(gold) Winner
2015	Bulgarian International	(Ukraine) Marija Ulitina	19–21, 21–16, 21–14	(gold) Winner
2015	Swiss International	(Thailand) Nitchaon Jindapol	21–16, 16–21, 14–21	(silver) Runner-up
2015	Irish Open	(Denmark) Natalia Koch Rohde	21–17, 21–16	(gold) Winner
2015	Italian International	(Denmark) Natalia Koch Rohde	18–21, 21–16, 15–21	(silver) Runner-up
2016	Swedish Masters	(Germany) Karin Schnaase	16–21, 22–20, 19–21	(silver) Runner-up
2016	Austrian Open	(China) Xu Wei	20–22, 15–21	(silver) Runner-up

Women's doubles
Year	Tournament	Partner	Opponent	Score	Result
2002	Czech International	(Belarus) Nadieżda Kostiuczyk	(Sweden) Elin Bergblom (Sweden) Johanna Persson	5–11, 8–11	(silver) Runner-up

Mixed doubles
Year	Tournament	Partner	Opponent	Score	Result
2003	Czech International	(Belarus) Andrei Konakh	(Canada) Mike Beres (Canada) Jody Patrick	15–11, 9–15, 11–15	(silver) Runner-up
2004	Finnish International	(Belarus) Andrei Konakh	(Ukraine) Vladislav Druzchenko (Ukraine) Elena Nozdran	9–15, 15–11, 17–15	(gold) Winner
2009	Polish International	(Poland) Michał Łogosz	(Poland) Adam Cwalina (Poland) Malgorzata Kurdelska	23–25, 21–11, 21–7	(gold) Winner
2017	Turkey International	(Germany) Peter Käsbauer	(Ukraine) Valeriy Atrashchenkov (Ukraine) Yelyzaveta Zharka	21–18, 22–20	(gold) Winner
2018	Estonian International	(Germany) Peter Käsbauer	(England) Gregory Mairs (England) Jenny Moore	21–14, 21–12	(gold) Winner
2018	Portugal International	(Germany) Peter Käsbauer	(Chinese Taipei) Lu Chen (Chinese Taipei) Li Zi-qing	21–8, 21–12	(gold) Winner
2018	KaBaL International	(Germany) Peter Käsbauer	(Poland) Paweł Śmiłowski (Poland) Magdalena Świerczyńska	21–10, 21–11	(gold) Winner

BWF International Challenge tournament
BWF International Series tournament
