= Kristína Gavnholt =

Czech badminton player (born 1988)

Personal information
- Born: Kristína Ludíková; 12 September 1988 (age 38) Trenčín, Czechoslovakia
- Height: 5 ft 8 in (1.73 m)

Sport
- Country: Czech Republic
- Sport: Badminton
- Handedness: Right
- BWF profile
Medal record
Women's badminton
Representing Czech Republic
European Junior Championships
Gold medal – first place	2007 Völklingen	Girls' doubles
Bronze medal – third place	2005 Den Bosch	Girls' doubles

Kristína Gavnholt (née Kristína Ludíková; born 12 September 1988) is a Czech badminton player. She competed for Czech Republic at the 2008, 2012 and 2016 Summer Olympics.

== Achievements ==
=== European Junior Championships ===
She was the girls' doubles champion of the 2007 European Junior Championships partnering with Belarusian player, Olga Konon. She also competed at the girls' singles, but lost at the quarter-final to Konon in a 3-sets game.

Girls' doubles
Year	Venue	Partner	Opponent	Score	Result
2005	De Maaspoort; Den Bosch, Netherlands	(Belarus) Olga Konon	(Russia) Olga Kozlova (Russia) Nina Vislova	5–15, 12–15	Bronze
2007	Hermann-Neuberger-Halle; Völklingen, Germany	(Belarus) Olga Konon	(Denmark) Joan Christiansen (Denmark) Line Damkjær Kruse	21–14, 21–17	Gold

=== BWF Grand Prix ===
The BWF Grand Prix had two levels, the Grand Prix and Grand Prix Gold. It was a series of badminton tournaments sanctioned by the Badminton World Federation (BWF) and played between 2007 and 2017.

Women's singles
Year	Tournament	Opponent	Score	Result	Ref.
2012	Dutch Open	(Netherlands) Judith Meulendijks	14–21, 21–13, 21–17	(gold) Winner	
2015	Russian Open	(Japan) Mayu Matsumoto	21–10, 22–20	(gold) Winner	

BWF Grand Prix Gold tournament
BWF Grand Prix tournament

=== BWF International Challenge/Series ===
Women's singles
Year	Tournament	Opponent	Score	Result	Ref.
2007	Nouméa International	(Vietnam) Lê Ngọc Nguyên Nhung		(gold) Winner	
2011	Czech International	(India) Arundhati Pantawane	21–10, 21–18	(gold) Winner	
2012	Swedish International	(France) Pi Hongyan	13–21, 17–21	(silver) Runner-up	
2015	Lagos International	(Turkey) Özge Bayrak	24–22, 18–21, 21–5	(gold) Winner	
2015	Slovak Open	(Netherlands) Gayle Mahulette	21–10, 21–15	(gold) Winner	
2015	Chile International	(Turkey) Özge Bayrak	15–21, 19–21	(silver) Runner-up	

BWF International Challenge tournament
BWF International Series tournament
BWF Future Series tournament
