= Sarah Walker (badminton) =

English badminton player

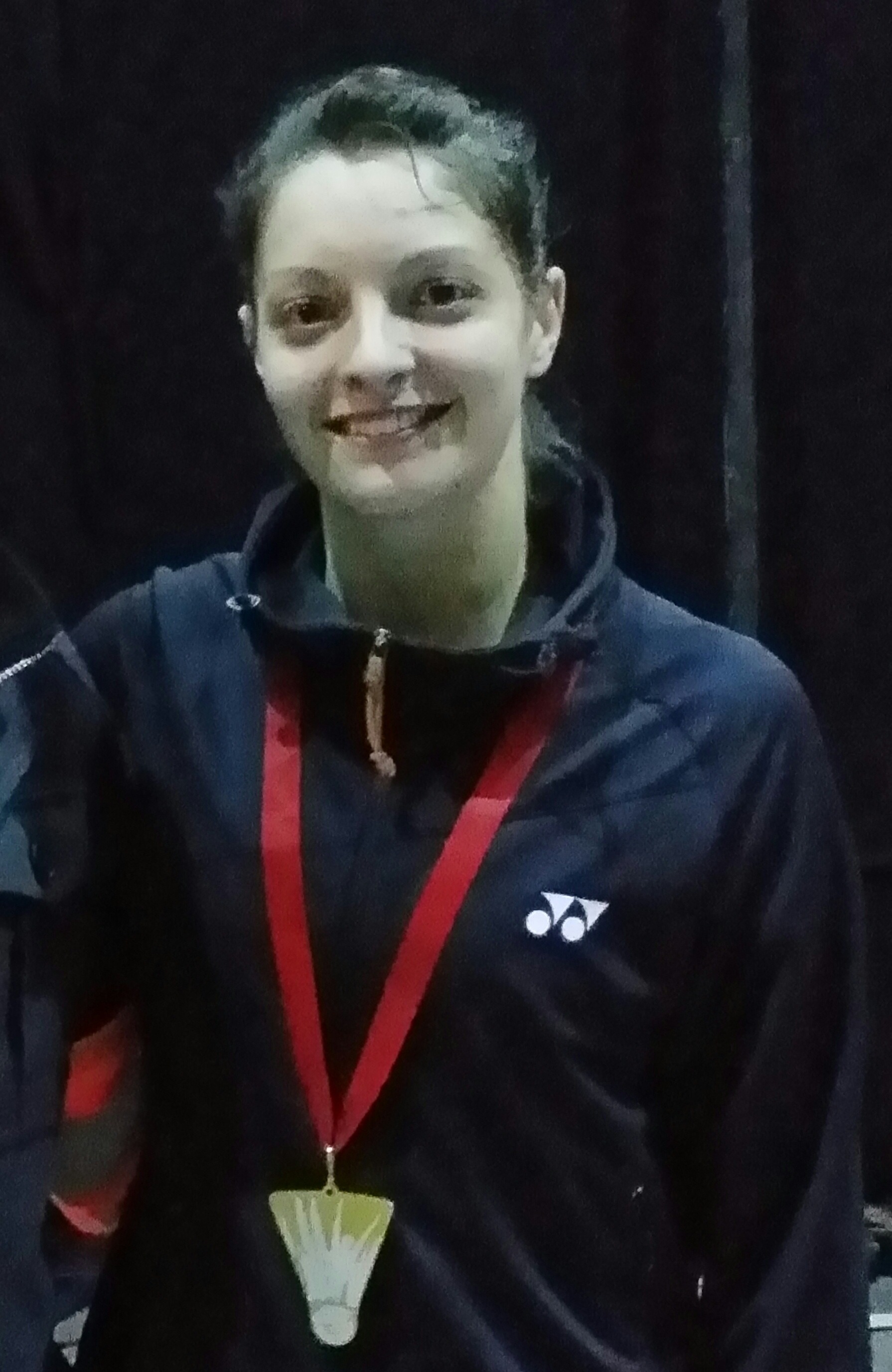
- Sarah Walker with her 2014 National Championships gold medal

Personal information
- Born: 22 November 1989 (age 36) Basildon, Essex, England
- Height: 1.73 m (5 ft 8 in)

Sport
- Country: England
- Sport: Badminton
- Handedness: Right
- Coached by: Dave Lindley

Women's singles & doubles
- Highest ranking: 69 (WS 27 February 2014); 25 (WD 26 October 2017); 192 (XD 29 September 2016)
- BWF profile
Medal record
Women's badminton
Representing England
Commonwealth Games
| Silver medal – second place | 2018 Gold Coast | Women's doubles |
| Silver medal – second place | 2014 Glasgow | Mixed team |
| Bronze medal – third place | 2018 Gold Coast | Mixed team |
European Championships
| Bronze medal – third place | 2017 Kolding | Women's doubles |
European Mixed Team Championships
| Bronze medal – third place | 2017 Lubin | Mixed team |
| Bronze medal – third place | 2013 Moscow | Mixed team |
European Junior Championships
| Gold medal – first place | 2007 Völklingen | Mixed team |
| Bronze medal – third place | 2007 Völklingen | Girls' doubles |

Sarah Walker (born 22 November 1989) is an English badminton player. She won the women's singles title at the English National Badminton Championships in 2013 and 2014.

== Achievements ==
=== Commonwealth Games ===
Women's doubles
| Year | Venue | Partner | Opponent | Score | Result |
|---|---|---|---|---|---|
| 2018 | Carrara Sports and Leisure Centre; Gold Coast, Australia | (England) Lauren Smith | (Malaysia) Chow Mei Kuan (Malaysia) Vivian Hoo | 12–21, 12–21 | Silver |

=== European Championships ===
Women's doubles
| Year | Venue | Partner | Opponent | Score | Result |
|---|---|---|---|---|---|
| 2017 | Sydbank Arena, Kolding, Denmark | (England) Lauren Smith | (Bulgaria) Gabriela Stoeva (Bulgaria) Stefani Stoeva | 15–21, 15–21 | Bronze |

=== European Junior Championships ===
Girls' doubles
| Year | Venue | Partner | Opponent | Score | Result |
|---|---|---|---|---|---|
| 2007 | Hermann-Neuberger-Halle; Völklingen, Saarbrücken, Germany | (England) Samantha Ward | (Denmark) Joan Christiansen (Denmark) Line Damkjær Kruse | 14–21, 15–21 | Bronze |

=== BWF International Challenge/Series ===
Women's doubles
| Year | Tournament | Partner | Opponent | Score | Result |
|---|---|---|---|---|---|
| 2017 | Czech Open | (England) Lauren Smith | (Japan) Erina Honda (Japan) Nozomi Shimizu | 13–21, 21–14, 16–21 | (silver) Runner-up |
| 2016 | Czech International | (England) Lauren Smith | (Bulgaria) Mariya Mitsova (Bulgaria) Petya Nedelcheva | 21–12, 21–18 | (gold) Winner |
| 2016 | Slovenia International | (England) Chloe Birch | (England) Jessica Pugh (Netherlands) Cheryl Seinen | 22–20, 21–19 | (gold) Winner |
| 2016 | Portugal International | (England) Chloe Birch | (Malaysia) Goh Yea Ching (Malaysia) Peck Yen Wei | 9–21, 15–21 | (silver) Runner-up |
| 2016 | Iceland International | (England) Jessica Pugh | (England) Chloe Birch (England) Jenny Wallwork | 21–10, 10–21, 21–17 | (gold) Winner |
| 2007 | Welsh International | (England) Samantha Ward | (Republic of Ireland) Chloe Magee (Republic of Ireland) Bing Huang | 11–21, 14–21 | (silver) Runner-up |

BWF International Challenge tournament
BWF International Series tournament
