= Kate Robertshaw =

British badminton player (born 1990)

Personal information
- Born: 13 September 1990 (age 36) Leeds, England
- Height: 5 ft 10 in (178 cm)

Sport
- Country: England
- Sport: Badminton
- Handedness: Right
- Coached by: Julian Robertson

Women's doubles
- Highest ranking: 23 (10 Oct 2013)
- Current ranking: 65 (28 August 2016)
- BWF profile
Medal record
Women's badminton
Representing England
Commonwealth Games
Silver medal – second place	2014 Glasgow	Mixed team
European Mixed Team Championships
Silver medal – second place	2015 Leuven	Mixed team
European Junior Championships
Gold medal – first place	2007 Völklingen	Mixed team
Bronze medal – third place	2009 Milan	Mixed team

Kate Robertshaw (born 13 September 1990) is a British badminton player. She competed for England in the mixed team event at the 2014 Commonwealth Games where she won a silver medal.

== Achievements ==
=== BWF International Challenge/Series ===
Women's doubles
Year	Tournament	Partner	Opponent	Score	Result
2015	Swedish Masters	(England) Sophie Brown	(Russia) Anastasia Chervyakova (Russia) Nina Vislova	21-17, 21-23, 14-21	(silver) Runner-up
2014	Welsh International	(England) Sophie Brown	(England) Heather Olver (England) Lauren Smith	11-21, 17-21	(silver) Runner-up
2013	Spanish Open	(England) Heather Olver	(Denmark) Maiken Fruergaard (Denmark) Sara Thygesen	18-21, 21-13, 22-20	(gold) Winner
2012	Swiss International	(England) Heather Olver	(Germany) Isabel Herttrich (Germany) Carla Nelte	21-15, 15-21, 23-21	(gold) Winner
2012	Czech International	(England) Heather Olver	(Scotland) Jillie Cooper (Scotland) Kirsty Gilmour	21-16, 21-15	(gold) Winner

BWF International Challenge tournament
BWF International Series tournament
BWF Future Series tournament
