= Yik-Man Wong =

Dutch badminton player (born 1990)

Personal information
- Born: 3 November 1990 (age 35) Tilburg, Netherlands

Sport
- Country: Netherlands
- Sport: Badminton

Women's singles & doubles
- Highest ranking: 213 (WS, 2 September 2010); 134 (WD, 15 October 2009)
- BWF profile
Medal record
Women's badminton
Representing Netherlands
European Women's Team Championships
Silver medal – second place	2008 Almere	Women's team
European Junior Championships
Silver medal – second place	2009 Milan	Mixed team

Yik-Man Wong (born 3 November 1990) is a Dutch badminton player. She mainly participates in singles matches.
