= Ramona Hacks =

German badminton player

Personal information
- Born: 2 November 1994 (age 32) Gladbeck, Germany

Sport
- Country: Germany
- Sport: Badminton
- Handedness: Right
- Coached by: Tobias Grosse; Marcus Busch

Women's
- Highest ranking: 355 (WS) 28 Mar 2013; 91 (WD) 12 Mar 2015; 236 (XD) 25 Jun 2015
- BWF profile
Medal record
Badminton
Representing Germany
European Junior Championships
Gold medal – first place	2011 Vantaa	Mixed team
Bronze medal – third place	2013 Ankara	Mixed team

Ramona Hacks (born 2 November 1994) is a German female badminton player.

== Achievements ==
=== BWF International Challenge/Series ===
Women's Doubles
Year	Tournament	Partner	Opponent	Score	Result
2014	Romanian International	(Germany) Barbara Bellenberg	(Germany) Kira Kattenbeck (Germany) Franziska Volkmann	21-15, 21-13	(gold) Winner

BWF International Challenge tournament
BWF International Series tournament
BWF Future Series tournament
