= Peter Mills (badminton) =

English badminton player (born 1988)

Personal information
- Born: 31 March 1988 (age 38) Nottingham, England
- Height: 1.78 m (5 ft 10 in)
- Weight: 75 kg (165 lb)

Sport
- Country: England
- Sport: Badminton
- Handedness: Right
- Coached by: Jakob Hoi

Men's doubles
- Highest ranking: 20 (29 May 2014)
- Current ranking: 57 (18 May 2017)
- BWF profile
Medal record
Men's badminton
Representing England
Commonwealth Games
Silver medal – second place	2014 Glasgow	Mixed team
Bronze medal – third place	2014 Glasgow	Men's doubles
European Mixed Team Championships
Silver medal – second place	2015 Leuven	Mixed team
Bronze medal – third place	2013 Moscow	Mixed team
European Men's Team Championships
Silver medal – second place	2014 Basel	Men's team
Bronze medal – third place	2016 Kazan	Men's team
Bronze medal – third place	2012 Amsterdam	Men's team
European Junior Championships
Gold medal – first place	2007 Völklingen	Boys' doubles
Gold medal – first place	2007 Völklingen	Mixed team

Peter Mills (born 31 March 1988) is an English badminton player who specializes in doubles. He started playing badminton in Southwell Junior Badminton Club at age 8, and became the England national badminton team at age 19. In 2007, he won the European Junior Badminton Championships in the boys' doubles event with Chris Adcock. He competed for England in the men's doubles and mixed team events at the 2014 Commonwealth Games where he won a bronze and silver medal respectively.

== Achievements ==
=== Commonwealth Games ===
Men's doubles
Year	Venue	Partner	Opponent	Score	Result
2014	Emirates Arena; Glasgow, Scotland	(England) Chris Langridge	(England) Chris Adcock (England) Andrew Ellis	21–17, 21–17	Bronze

=== European Junior Championships ===
Boys' doubles
Year	Venue	Partner	Opponent	Score	Result
2007	Hermann-Neuberger-Halle; Völklingen, Saarbrücken, Germany	(England) Chris Adcock	(Denmark) Mads Conrad-Petersen (Denmark) Mads Pieler Kolding	21–16, 21–15	Gold

=== BWF Grand Prix ===
The BWF Grand Prix has two levels, the Grand Prix and Grand Prix Gold. It is a series of badminton tournaments sanctioned by the Badminton World Federation (BWF) since 2007.

Men's doubles
Year	Tournament	Partner	Opponent	Score	Result
2016	Scottish Open	(Scotland) Adam Hall	(Denmark) Mathias Christiansen (Denmark) David Daugaard	21–15, 19–21, 15–21	(silver) Runner-up
2015	Scottish Open	(England) Andrew Ellis	(Germany) Michael Fuchs (Germany) Johannes Schöttler	15–21, 18–21	(silver) Runner-up
2012	Bitburger Open	(England) Chris Langridge	(Germany) Ingo Kindervater (Germany) Johannes Schöttler	15–21, 11–21	(silver) Runner-up

BWF Grand Prix Gold tournament
BWF Grand Prix tournament

=== BWF International Challenge/Series ===
Men's doubles
Year	Tournament	Partner	Opponent	Score	Result
2015	Finnish Open	(England) Andrew Ellis	(Denmark) Mathias Christiansen (Denmark) David Daugaard	21–19, 21–12	(gold) Winner
2013	Belgian International	(England) Chris Langridge	(Denmark) Anders Skaarup Rasmussen (Denmark) Kim Astrup	26–28, 18–21	(silver) Runner-up
2012	Czech International	(England) Chris Langridge	(England) Peter Briggs (England) Harley Towler	21–14, 21–16	(gold) Winner
2011	Irish International	(England) Marcus Ellis	(Poland) Adam Cwalina (Poland) Michal Logosz	15–21, 15–21	(silver) Runner-up
2011	Scottish International	(England) Marcus Ellis	(Russia) Vladimir Ivanov (Russia) Ivan Sozonov	19–21, 19–21	(silver) Runner-up
2010	Scottish International	(England) Marcus Ellis	(England) Chris Adcock (England) Andrew Ellis	21–19, 11–21, 21–15	(gold) Winner
2010	Norwegian International	(England) Marcus Ellis	(Germany) Ingo Kindervater (Germany) Johannes Schöttler	17–21, 21–23	(silver) Runner-up
2010	Bulgarian International	(England) Marcus Ellis	(Scotland) Martin Campbell (Scotland) Angus Gilmour	21–14, 21–10	(gold) Winner
2010	Czech International	(England) Marcus Ellis	(England) Chris Langridge (England) Robin Middleton	9–21, 19–21	(silver) Runner-up
2009	Irish International	(England) Marcus Ellis	(Denmark) Mads Conrad-Petersen (Denmark) Mads Pieler Kolding	18–21, 11–21	(silver) Runner-up
2009	Belgian International	(England) Marcus Ellis	(Netherlands) Ruud Bosch (Netherlands) Koen Ridder	28–30, 12–21	(silver) Runner-up
2007	Welsh International	(England) Matthew Honey	(Poland) Wojciech Szkudlarczyk (Poland) Adam Cwalina	10–21, 22–20, 15–21	(silver) Runner-up

BWF International Challenge tournament
BWF International Series tournament
