= Christian Lind Thomsen =

Danish badminton player (born 1985)

Personal information
- Born: 9 January 1985 (age 41) Holstebro, Denmark
- Height: 1.85 m (6 ft 1 in)

Sport
- Country: Denmark
- Sport: Badminton
- Handedness: Right

Men's singles & doubles
- Highest ranking: 41 (MS 18 March 2010); 88 (MD 12 June 2014)
- BWF profile

Christian Lind Thomsen (born 9 January 1985) is a Danish badminton player.

== Achievements ==
=== BWF International Challenge/Series ===
Men's singles

Year	Tournament	Opponent	Score	Result
2008	Miami PanAm International	(Guatemala) Kevin Cordón	18–21, 10–21	(silver) Runner-up
2009	Portugal International	(Sweden) Magnus Sahlberg	11–21, 16–21	(silver) Runner-up
2009	Belgian International	(Germany) Marc Zwiebler	13–21, 21–16, 15–21	(silver) Runner-up
2009	Iceland International	(Denmark) Kasper Ødum	21–8, 21–17	(gold) Winner
2014	Slovenian International	(Denmark) Flemming Quach	6–21, 13–21	(silver) Runner-up
2015	Belgian International	(Denmark) Anders Antonsen	18–21, 17–21	(silver) Runner-up

BWF International Challenge tournament
BWF International Series tournament
BWF Future Series tournament
