= Michelle Chan =

Michelle Chan may refer to:

- Michelle Chan (badminton)
- Michelle Chan (diplomat)
