= Lukas Schmidt =

German badminton player (born 1988)

Personal information
- Born: 19 September 1988 (age 38) Regensburg, Germany
- Height: 1.83 m (6 ft 0 in)

Sport
- Country: Germany
- Sport: Badminton
- Handedness: Right

Men's singles
- Highest ranking: 64 (MS 17 January 2013)
- BWF profile
Medal record
Men's badminton
Representing Germany
European Mixed Team Championships
| Gold medal – first place | 2013 Moscow | Mixed team |
| Bronze medal – third place | 2011 Amsterdam | Mixed team |
European Men's Team Championships
| Silver medal – second place | 2012 Amsterdam | Men's team |
| Bronze medal – third place | 2014 Basel | Men's team |
European Junior Championships
| Bronze medal – third place | 2007 Völklingen | Boys' doubles |

Lukas Schmidt (born 19 September 1988) is a German badminton player. He was a bronze medalist at the 2007 European Junior Championships in the boys' doubles event with Peter Käsbauer. Schmidt was a champions at the 2012 and 2014 Croatian International in the men's singles event.

== Achievements ==
=== European Junior Championships ===
Boys' doubles
| Year | Venue | Partner | Opponent | Score | Result |
|---|---|---|---|---|---|
| 2007 | Hermann-Neuberger-Halle; Völklingen, Saarbrücken, Germany | (Germany) Peter Käsbauer | (Denmark) Mads Conrad-Petersen (Denmark) Mads Pieler Kolding | 15–21, 11–21 | Bronze |

=== BWF International Challenge/Series ===
Men's singles
| Year | Tournament | Opponent | Score | Result |
|---|---|---|---|---|
| 2014 | Croatian International | (Austria) David Obernosterer | 21–14, 21–9 | (gold) Winner |
| 2012 | Portugal International | (Germany) Dieter Domke | 16–21, 17–21 | (silver) Runner-up |
| 2012 | Croatian International | (Denmark) Emil Holst | 21–18, 11–21, 21–19 | (gold) Winner |
| 2011 | Portugal International | (Germany) Sven-Eric Kastens | 21–15, 18–21, 11–21 | (silver) Runner-up |

BWF International Challenge tournament
BWF International Series tournament
BWF Future Series tournament
