= Patty Stolzenbach =

Dutch badminton player (born 1989)

Personal information
- Born: 13 November 1989 (age 36) Arnhem, Netherlands

Sport
- Country: Netherlands
- Sport: Badminton

Women's singles & doubles
- Highest ranking: 72 (WS, 4 April 2013); 51 (WD, 21 January 2010)
- BWF profile
Medal record
Women's badminton
Representing Netherlands
European Women's Team Championships
Silver medal – second place	2008 Almere	[Women's team
Bronze medal – third place	2012 Amsterdam	Women's team
European Junior Championships
Silver medal – second place	2007 Völklingen	Mixed team
Bronze medal – third place	2007 Völklingen	Girls' singles

Patty Stolzenbach (born 13 November 1989) is a Dutch badminton player. In 2007, she won bronze medal at the European Junior Badminton Championships in girls' singles event.

== Achievements ==
=== European Junior Championships ===
Girls' singles
Year	Venue	Opponent	Score	Result
2007	Hermann-Neuberger-Halle, Völklingen, Saarbrücken, Germany	(England) Michelle Cheung	15–21, 18–21	Bronze

=== BWF International Challenge/Series ===
Women's singles
Year	Tournament	Opponent	Score	Result
2011	Slovak Open	(Finland) Anu Nieminen	14–21, 21–19, 16–21	(silver) Runner-up
2012	Suriname International	(Suriname) Crystal Leefmans	21–6, 21–12	(gold) Winner

Women's doubles
Year	Tournament	Partner	Opponent	Score	Result
2008	Irish International	(Netherlands) Paulien van Dooremalen	(Denmark) Helle Nielsen (Denmark) Marie Røpke	25–23, 17–21, 8–21	(silver) Runner-up

BWF International Challenge tournament
BWF International Series tournament
BWF Future Series tournament
