= Dieter Domke =

German badminton player

Personal information
- Born: 9 February 1987 (age 39) Kostanay, Kazakh SSR, USSR
- Height: 1.98 m (6 ft 6 in)

Sport
- Country: Germany
- Sport: Badminton
- Handedness: Right

Men's singles
- Highest ranking: 38 (23 October 2014)
- BWF profile
Medal record
Men's Badminton
Representing Germany
European Games
Bronze medal – third place	2015 Baku	Men's singles
European Mixed Team Championships
Gold medal – first place	2013 Moscow	Mixed team
Silver medal – second place	2011 Amsterdam	Mixed team
Bronze medal – third place	2015 Leuven	Mixed team
European Men's Team Championships
Silver medal – second place	2012 Amsterdam	Men's team
Bronze medal – third place	2008 Almere	Men's team
Bronze medal – third place	2010 Warsaw	Men's team
Bronze medal – third place	2014 Basel	Men's team
Bronze medal – third place	2016 Kazan	Men's team
European Junior Championships
Gold medal – first place	2003 Esbjerg	Mixed team
Silver medal – second place	2005 Den Bosch	Boys' singles

Dieter Domke (born 9 February 1987) is a German badminton player.

== Achievements ==
=== European Games ===
Men's singles
Year	Venue	Opponent	Score	Result
2015	Baku Sports Hall; Baku, Azerbaijan	(Denmark) Emil Holst	14–21, 15–21	Bronze

=== European Junior Championships ===
Boys' singles
Year	Venue	Opponent	Score	Result
2005	De Maaspoort; Den Bosch, Netherlands	(England) Rajiv Ouseph	0–15, 5–15	Silver

=== BWF Grand Prix ===
The BWF Grand Prix had two levels, the Grand Prix and Grand Prix Gold. It was a series of badminton tournaments sanctioned by the Badminton World Federation (BWF) and played between 2007 and 2017.

Men's singles
Year	Tournament	Opponent	Score	Result
2014	Brasil Open	(Republic of Ireland) Scott Evans	11–7, 11–6, 6–11, 8–11, 7–11	(silver) Runner-up

BWF Grand Prix Gold tournament
BWF Grand Prix tournament

=== BWF International Challenge/Series ===
Men's singles
Year	Tournament	Opponent	Score	Result
2009	Hungarian International	(Sweden) Magnus Sahlberg	21–14, 21–10	(gold) Winner
2011	Croatian International	(Estonia) Raul Must	21–16, 21–7	(gold) Winner
2012	Portugal International	(Germany) Lukas Schmidt	21–16, 21–17	(gold) Winner
2012	Swiss International	(England) Toby Penty	21–14, 20–22, 21–18	(gold) Winner
2013	Irish Open	(Malaysia) Misbun Ramdan Misbun	13–21, 18–21	(silver) Runner-up
2014	White Nights	(France) Thomas Rouxel	21–16, 25–23	(gold) Winner

BWF International Challenge tournament
BWF International Series tournament
BWF Future Series tournament
