= Karina Jørgensen =

Indian-born Danish badminton player

Personal information
- Born: 10 October 1988 (age 38) Gangtok, Sikkim, India
- Height: 1.59 m (5 ft 3 in)
- Weight: 48 kg (106 lb)

Sport
- Country: Denmark
- Sport: Badminton
- Handedness: Right

Women's singles
- Career record: 95 wins, 74 losses
- Highest ranking: 48 (26 January 2012)
- BWF profile
Medal record
Women's badminton
Representing Denmark
Sudirman Cup
Silver medal – second place	2011 Qingdao	Mixed team
European Mixed Team Championships
Silver medal – second place	2011 Amsterdam	Mixed team
European Women's Team Championships
Gold medal – first place	2010 Warsaw	Women's team
Silver medal – second place	2012 Amsterdam	Women's team
European Junior Championships
Gold medal – first place	2007 Völklingen	Girls' singles
Bronze medal – third place	2007 Völklingen	Mixed team

Karina Jørgensen (born 10 October 1988) is an Indian-born Danish badminton player. She is the former European junior champion in the girls' singles event in 2007. In the senior event, Jørgensen was part of the Danish winning team at the 2010 European Women's Team and 2011 European Mixed Team Championships.

== Achievements ==
=== European Junior Championships ===
Girls' singles
Year	Venue	Opponent	Score	Result
2007	Hermann-Neuberger-Halle; Völklingen, Saarbrücken, Germany	(England) Michelle Cheung	13–21, 21–12, 24–22	Gold

=== BWF International Challenge/Series ===
Women's singles
Year	Tournament	Opponent	Score	Result
2007	Cyprus International	(Estonia) Kati Tolmoff	14–21, 9–21	(silver) Runner-up
2010	Dutch International	(Republic of Ireland) Chloe Magee	20–22, 21–14, 21–12	(gold) Winner
2010	Czech International	(France) Sashina Vignes Waran	24–22, 22–20	(gold) Winner
2010	Irish International	(Scotland) Susan Egelstaff	21–23, 8–21	(silver) Runner-up

BWF International Challenge tournament
BWF International Series tournament
BWF Future Series tournament
