= Line Damkjær Kruse =

Danish badminton player (born 1988)

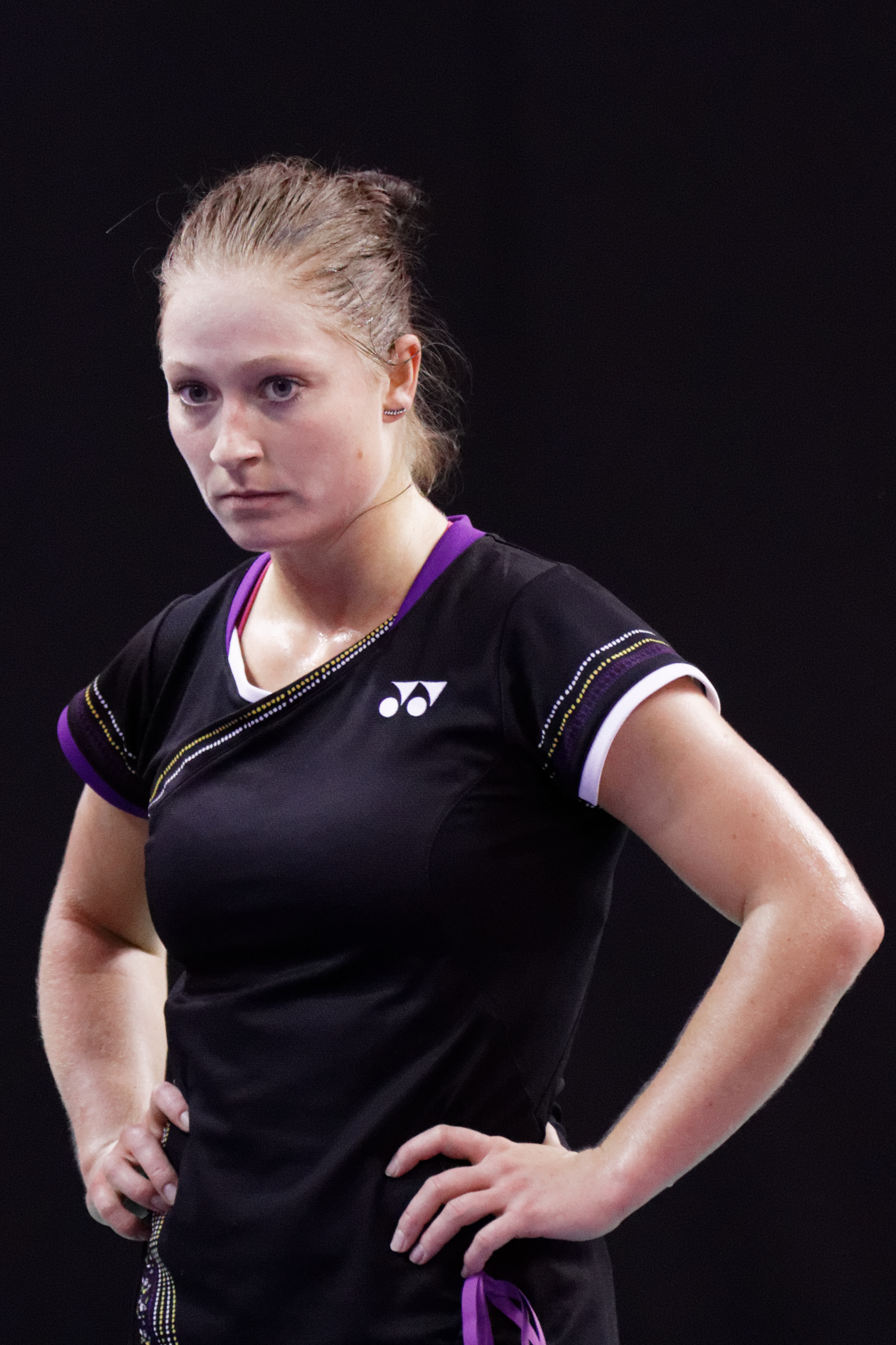

Personal information
- Born: 7 January 1988 (age 38) Aarhus, Denmark

Sport
- Country: Denmark
- Sport: Badminton
- Handedness: Right

Women's & mixed doubles
- Highest ranking: 14 (WD 12 January 2012); 91 (XD 17 December 2009)
- BWF profile
Medal record
Women's badminton
Representing Denmark
Sudirman Cup
Silver medal – second place	2011 Qingdao	Mixed team
Bronze medal – third place	2013 Kuala Lumpur	Mixed team
European Championships
Silver medal – second place	2012 Karlskrona	Women's doubles
Silver medal – second place	2014 Kazan	Women's doubles
Bronze medal – third place	2010 Manchester	Women's doubles
European Mixed Team Championships
Gold medal – first place	2013 Moscow	Mixed team
European Women's Team Championships
Gold medal – first place	2008 Almere	Women's team
Gold medal – first place	2010 Warsaw	Women's team
Gold medal – first place	2014 Basel	Women's team
Silver medal – second place	2012 Amsterdam	Women's team
European Junior Championships
Silver medal – second place	2007 Völklingen	Girls' doubles
Bronze medal – third place	2007 Völklingen	Mixed doubles
Bronze medal – third place	2007 Völklingen	Mixed team

Line Damkjær Kruse (born 7 January 1988) is a Danish badminton player. She won silver medal in girls' doubles event at the 2007 European Junior Championships, and bronze medal in mixed doubles event.

== Achievements ==
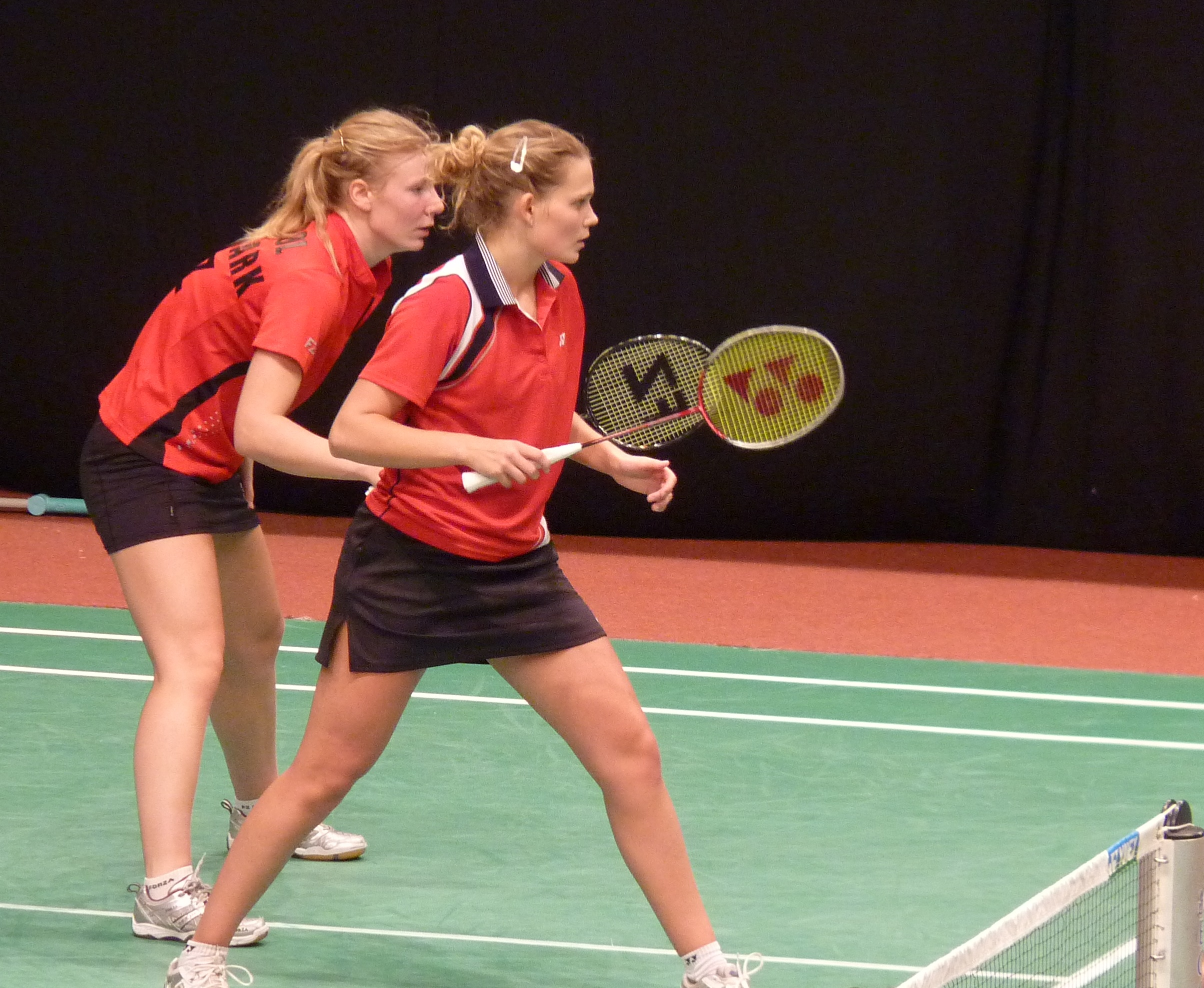
Line Damkjær Kruse and Mie Schjøtt-Kristensen

=== European Championships ===
Women's doubles
Year	Venue	Partner	Opponent	Score	Result
2010	Manchester Evening News Arena; Manchester, England	(Denmark) Mie Schjøtt-Kristensen	(Russia) Valeria Sorokina (Russia) Nina Vislova	11–21, 16–21	Bronze
2012	Telenor Arena; Karlskrona, Sweden	(Denmark) Marie Røpke	(Denmark) Christinna Pedersen (Denmark) Kamilla Rytter Juhl	17–21, 22–24	Silver
2014	Gymnastics Center; Kazan, Russia	(Denmark) Marie Røpke	(Denmark) Christinna Pedersen (Denmark) Kamilla Rytter Juhl	11–21, 11–21	Silver

=== European Junior Championships ===
Girls' doubles
Year	Venue	Partner	Opponent	Score	Result
2007	Hermann-Neuberger-Halle; Völklingen, Germany	(Denmark) Joan Christiansen	(Belarus) Olga Konon (Czech Republic) Kristína Ludíková	14–21, 7–21	Silver

Mixed doubles
Year	Venue	Partner	Opponent	Score	Result
2007	Hermann-Neuberger-Halle; Völklingen, Germany	(Denmark) Mads Pieler Kolding	(Denmark) Christian Larsen (Denmark) Joan Christiansen	13–21, 21–12, 17–21	Bronze

=== BWF Grand Prix ===
The BWF Grand Prix had two levels, the Grand Prix and Grand Prix Gold. It was a series of badminton tournaments sanctioned by the Badminton World Federation (BWF) and played between 2007 and 2017.

Women's doubles
Year	Tournament	Partner	Opponent	Score	Result
2009	Bitburger Open	(Denmark) Mie Schjøtt-Kristensen	(Denmark) Helle Nielsen (Denmark) Marie Røpke	21–18, 19–21, 19–21	(silver) Runner-up
2013	London Grand Prix Gold	(Denmark) Marie Røpke	(Denmark) Christinna Pedersen (Denmark) Kamilla Rytter Juhl	21–12, 17–21, 15–21	(silver) Runner-up

BWF Grand Prix Gold tournament
BWF Grand Prix tournament

=== BWF International Challenge/Series ===
Women's doubles
Year	Tournament	Partner	Opponent	Score	Result
2006	Portugal International	(Denmark) Marie Røpke	(England) Liza Parker (England) Jenny Day	13–21, 9–21	(silver) Runner-up
2007	Hungarian International	(Denmark) Camilla Sørensen	(Sweden) Sophia Hansson (Sweden) Emelie Lennartsson	21–11, 21–15	(gold) Winner
2009	Dutch International	(Denmark) Mie Schjøtt-Kristensen	(Germany) Sandra Marinello (Germany) Birgit Overzier	21–19, 21–18	(gold) Winner
2009	Spanish Open	(Denmark) Mie Schjøtt-Kristensen	(India) Aparna Balan (India) Shruti Kurien	21–14, 17–21, 21–15	(gold) Winner
2011	Swedish International	(Denmark) Marie Røpke	(Japan) Rie Eto (Japan) Yu Wakita	21–14, 21–16	(gold) Winner
2011	Austrian International	(Denmark) Marie Røpke	(Japan) Yuriko Miki (Japan) Koharu Yonemoto	24–26, 15–21	(silver) Runner-up
2011	Denmark International	(Denmark) Marie Røpke	(Denmark) Maria Helsbøl (Denmark) Anne Skelbæk	21–14, 21–14	(gold) Winner
2012	Denmark International	(Denmark) Marie Røpke	(England) Lauren Smith (England) Gabrielle White	21–18, 21–19	(gold) Winner
2013	Denmark International	(Denmark) Marie Røpke	(Sweden) Emelie Lennartsson (Sweden) Emma Wengberg	22–20, 21–11	(gold) Winner
2014	Swedish Masters	(Denmark) Marie Røpke	(Netherlands) Eefje Muskens (Netherlands) Selena Piek	19–21, 11–21	(silver) Runner-up
2014	Finnish Open	(Denmark) Marie Røpke	(Bulgaria) Gabriela Stoeva (Bulgaria) Stefani Stoeva	21–17, 21–14	(gold) Winner

Mixed doubles
Year	Tournament	Partner	Opponent	Score	Result
2007	Hungarian International	(Denmark) Mads Pieler Kolding	(China) Zhang Yi (China) Cai Jiani	15–21, 17–21	(silver) Runner-up
2007	Hellas International	(Denmark) Mads Pieler Kolding	(Denmark) Jeppe Lund (Denmark) Louise Hansen	Walkover	(gold) Winner
2008	Swedish International	(Denmark) Mads Pieler Kolding	(Denmark) Peter Steffensen (Denmark) Julie Houmann	8–21, 17–21	(silver) Runner-up
2008	Finnish International	(Denmark) Mads Pieler Kolding	(Indonesia) Fran Kurniawan (Indonesia) Shendy Puspa Irawati	12–21, 18–21	(silver) Runner-up

BWF International Challenge tournament
BWF International Series tournament
BWF Future Series tournament
