= 2012 European Men's Team Badminton Championships group stage =

This article lists the full results for group stage of 2012 European Men's Team Badminton Championships. The group stage was held from 14 to 16 February 2012.

== Group 1 ==
| Pos | Team | Pld | W | L | MF | MA | MD | GF | GA | GD | PF | PA | PD | Pts | Qualification | Denmark | Sweden | Scotland |
|---|---|---|---|---|---|---|---|---|---|---|---|---|---|---|---|---|---|---|
| 1 | Denmark | 2 | 2 | 0 | 10 | 0 | +10 | 20 | 1 | +19 | 437 | 313 | +124 | 2 | Knockout stage | — | 5–0 | 5–0 |
| 2 | Sweden | 2 | 1 | 1 | 4 | 6 | −2 | 8 | 14 | −6 | 374 | 445 | −71 | 1 | | | — | 4–1 |
| 3 | Scotland | 2 | 0 | 2 | 1 | 9 | −8 | 5 | 18 | −13 | 398 | 451 | −53 | 0 | | | | — |

Source: BWF

=== Scotland vs. Sweden ===
Scotland
1
Sporthallen Zuid, Court 1
14 February 2012, 18:00 UTC+2

Sweden
4

| | | | 1 | 2 | 3 |
|---|---|---|---|---|---|
| 1 | (Scotland) (Sweden) | Kieran Merrilees; Henri Hurskainen | 23; 21 | 16; 21 | 13; 21 |
| 2 | (Scotland) (Sweden) | Martin Campbell / Paul van Rietvelde; Patrick Lundqvist / Jonatan Nordh | 21; 14 | 21; 19 |
| 3 | (Scotland) (Sweden) | Gordon Hoggan; Mattias Borg | 16; 21 | 16; 21 |
| 4 | (Scotland) (Sweden) | Jamie Neill / Keith Turnbull; Nico Ruponen / Magnus Sahlberg | 21; 23 | 20; 22 |
| 5 | (Scotland) (Sweden) | Calum Menzies; Mikael Westerbäck | 17; 21 | 21; 15 | 14; 21 |

=== Denmark vs. Scotland ===
Denmark
5
Sporthallen Zuid, Court 7
15 February 2012, 14:15 UTC+2

Scotland
0

| | | | 1 | 2 | 3 |
|---|---|---|---|---|---|
| 1 | (Denmark) (Scotland) | Hans-Kristian Vittinghus; Kieran Merrilees | 14; 21 | 21; 16 | 21; 8 |
| 2 | (Denmark) (Scotland) | Mads Conrad-Petersen / Jonas Rasmussen; Martin Campbell / Angus Gilmour | 21; 13 | 21; 17 |
| 3 | (Denmark) (Scotland) | Viktor Axelsen; Gordon Hoggan | 21; 11 | 21; 12 |
| 4 | (Denmark) (Scotland) | Rasmus Bonde / Anders Kristiansen; Jamie Neill / Paul van Rietvelde | 21; 16 | 21; 19 |
| 5 | (Denmark) (Scotland) | Rasmus Fladberg; Calum Menzies | 21; 15 | 21; 18 |

=== Denmark vs. Sweden ===
Denmark
5
Sporthallen Zuid, Court 3
16 February 2012, 10:00 UTC+2

Sweden
0

| | | | 1 | 2 | 3 |
|---|---|---|---|---|---|
| 1 | (Denmark) (Sweden) | Hans-Kristian Vittinghus; Henri Hurskainen | 21; 14 | 21; 14 |
| 2 | (Denmark) (Sweden) | Mads Conrad-Petersen / Jonas Rasmussen; Patrick Lundqvist / Jonatan Nordh | 21; 18 | 21; 11 |
| 3 | (Denmark) (Sweden) | Viktor Axelsen; Mattias Borg | 21; 14 | 21; 4 |
| 4 | (Denmark) (Sweden) | Rasmus Bonde / Anders Kristiansen; Nico Ruponen / Magnus Sahlberg | 22; 20 | 21; 17 |
| 5 | (Denmark) (Sweden) | Rasmus Fladberg; Mikael Westerbäck | 21; 14 | 23; 21 |

== Group 2 ==
| Pos | Team | Pld | W | L | MF | MA | MD | GF | GA | GD | PF | PA | PD | Pts | Qualification | Germany | Ireland | Israel |
|---|---|---|---|---|---|---|---|---|---|---|---|---|---|---|---|---|---|---|
| 1 | Germany | 2 | 2 | 0 | 10 | 0 | +10 | 16 | 0 | +16 | 336 | 188 | +148 | 2 | Knockout stage | — | 5–0 | 5–0 |
| 2 | Ireland | 2 | 1 | 1 | 4 | 6 | −2 | 8 | 9 | −1 | 283 | 299 | −16 | 1 | | | — | 4–1 |
| 3 | Israel | 2 | 0 | 2 | 1 | 9 | −8 | 3 | 18 | −15 | 291 | 423 | −132 | 0 | | | | — |

Source: BWF

=== Israel vs. Ireland ===
Israel
1
Sporthallen Zuid, Court 7
14 February 2012, 14:15 UTC+2

Ireland
4

| | | | 1 | 2 | 3 |
|---|---|---|---|---|---|
| 1 | (Israel) (Republic of Ireland) | Misha Zilberman; Scott Evans | 19; 21 | 11; 21 |
| 2 | (Israel) (Republic of Ireland) | Vladi Cheslov; Tony Stephenson | 8; 21 | 22; 24 |
| 3 | (Israel) (Republic of Ireland) | Alexander Bass; Niall Tierney | 21; 13 | 12; 21 | 19; 21 |
| 4 | (Israel) (Republic of Ireland) | Vladi Cheslov / Daniel Chislov; Scott Evans / Sam Magee | 15; 21 | 4; 21 |
| 5 | (Israel) (Republic of Ireland) | Alexander Bass / Misha Zilberman; Tony Stephenson / Niall Tierney | 21; 13 | 21; 16 |

=== Germany vs. Israel ===
Germany
5
Sporthallen Zuid, Court 5
15 February 2012, 18:00 UTC+2

Israel
0

| | | | 1 | 2 | 3 |
|---|---|---|---|---|---|
| 1 | (Germany) (Israel) | Dieter Domke; Misha Zilberman | 21; 11 | 21; 18 |
| 2 | (Germany) (Israel) | Marcel Reuter; Vladi Cheslov | 21; 9 | 21; 15 |
| 3 | (Germany) (Israel) | Lukas Schmidt; Alexander Bass | 21; 5 | 21; 11 |
| 4 | (Germany) (Israel) | Michael Fuchs / Oliver Roth; Vladi Cheslov / Ariel Shainski | 21; 13 | 21; 8 |
| 5 | (Germany) (Israel) | Peter Käsbauer / Josche Zurwonne; Alexandre Bass / Misha Zilberman | 21; 11 | 21; 17 |

=== Germany vs. Ireland ===
Germany
5
Sporthallen Zuid, Court 4
16 February 2012, 14:00 UTC+2

Ireland
0

| | | | 1 | 2 | 3 |
|---|---|---|---|---|---|---|
| 1 | (Germany) (Republic of Ireland) | Marc Zwiebler; Scott Evans | 21; 15 | 21; 11 |
| 2 | (Germany) (Republic of Ireland) | Marcel Reuter; Owen Marron | | | | w/o |
| 3 | (Germany) (Republic of Ireland) | Lukas Schmidt; Sam Magee | 21; 11 | 21; 14 |
| 4 | (Germany) (Republic of Ireland) | Michael Fuchs / Oliver Roth; Owen Marron / Tony Stephenson | | | | w/o |
| 5 | (Germany) (Republic of Ireland) | Ingo Kindervater / Johannes Schöttler; Scott Evans / Sam Magee | 21; 6 | 21; 13 |

== Group 3 ==
| Pos | Team | Pld | W | L | MF | MA | MD | GF | GA | GD | PF | PA | PD | Pts | Qualification | England | Czech Republic | Switzerland | Slovenia |
|---|---|---|---|---|---|---|---|---|---|---|---|---|---|---|---|---|---|---|---|
| 1 | England | 3 | 3 | 0 | 15 | 0 | +15 | 30 | 3 | +27 | 687 | 421 | +266 | 3 | Knockout stage | — | 5–0 | 5–0 | 5–0 |
| 2 | Czech Republic | 3 | 2 | 1 | 8 | 7 | +1 | 19 | 16 | +3 | 594 | 635 | −41 | 2 | | | — | 3–2 | 5–0 |
| 3 | Switzerland | 3 | 1 | 2 | 5 | 10 | −5 | 12 | 21 | −9 | 550 | 609 | −59 | 1 | | | | — | 3–2 |
| 4 | Slovenia | 3 | 0 | 3 | 2 | 13 | −11 | 5 | 26 | −21 | 469 | 635 | −166 | 0 | | | | | — |

Source: BWF

=== England vs. Switzerland ===
England
5
Sporthallen Zuid, Court 1
14 February 2012, 10:00 UTC+2

Switzerland
0

| | | | 1 | 2 | 3 |
|---|---|---|---|---|---|
| 1 | (England) (Switzerland) | Rajiv Ouseph; Christian Bösiger | 19; 21 | 21; 14 | 21; 12 |
| 2 | (England) (Switzerland) | Chris Adcock / Andrew Ellis; Anthony Dumartheray / Thomas Heiniger | 21; 18 | 21; 9 |
| 3 | (England) (Switzerland) | Carl Baxter; Christoph Heiniger | 21; 13 | 21; 13 |
| 4 | (England) (Switzerland) | Chris Langridge / Peter Mills; Florian Schmid / Gilles Tripet | 21; 11 | 21; 11 |
| 5 | (England) (Switzerland) | Ben Beckman; Nicolas Blondel | 21; 8 | 21; 19 |

=== Slovenia vs. Czech Republic ===
Slovenia
0
Sporthallen Zuid, Court 2
14 February 2012, 18:00 UTC+2

Czech Republic
5

| | | | 1 | 2 | 3 |
|---|---|---|---|---|---|
| 1 | (Slovenia) (Czech Republic) | Iztok Utroša; Petr Koukal | 21; 17 | 18; 21 | 20; 22 |
| 2 | (Slovenia) (Czech Republic) | Luka Petrič; Jan Fröhlich | 16; 21 | 17; 21 |
| 3 | (Slovenia) (Czech Republic) | Matevž Bajuk; Milan Ludík | 17; 21 | 15; 21 |
| 4 | (Slovenia) (Czech Republic) | Luka Petrič / Iztok Utroša; Jan Fröhlich / Milan Ludík | 17; 21 | 11; 21 |
| 5 | (Slovenia) (Czech Republic) | Matevž Bajuk / Aleš Murn; Jakub Bitman / Petr Koukal | 17; 21 | 14; 21 |

=== Switzerland vs. Czech Republic ===
Switzerland
2
Sporthallen Zuid, Court 2
15 February 2012, 18:00 UTC+2

Czech Republic
3

| | | | 1 | 2 | 3 |
|---|---|---|---|---|---|
| 1 | (Switzerland) (Czech Republic) | Christian Bösiger; Petr Koukal | 21; 9 | 21; 9 |
| 2 | (Switzerland) (Czech Republic) | Christoph Heiniger; Jan Fröhlich | 14; 21 | 10; 21 |
| 3 | (Switzerland) (Czech Republic) | Nicolas Blondel; Milan Ludík | 8; 21 | 20; 22 |
| 4 | (Switzerland) (Czech Republic) | Thomas Heiniger / Florian Schmid; Jakub Bitman / Petr Koukal | 21; 10 | 17; 21 | 21; 17 |
| 5 | (Switzerland) (Czech Republic) | Anthony Dumartheray / Gilles Tripet; Jan Fröhlich / Milan Ludík | 14; 21 | 21; 17 | 16; 21 |

=== England vs. Slovenia ===
England
5
Sporthallen Zuid, Court 9
15 February 2012, 18:15 UTC+2

Slovenia
0

| | | | 1 | 2 | 3 |
|---|---|---|---|---|---|
| 1 | (England) (Slovenia) | Rajiv Ouseph; Iztok Utroša | 21; 13 | 21; 19 |
| 2 | (England) (Slovenia) | Carl Baxter; Luka Petrič | 21; 6 | 21; 9 |
| 3 | (England) (Slovenia) | Toby Penty; Alen Roj | 21; 15 | 21; 11 |
| 4 | (England) (Slovenia) | Marcus Ellis / Nathan Robertson; Matevž Bajuk / Aleš Murn | 21; 4 | 21; 9 |
| 5 | (England) (Slovenia) | Chris Adcock / Andrew Ellis; Luka Petrič / Alen Roj | 21; 12 | 21; 18 |

=== Switzerland vs. Slovenia ===
Switzerland
3
Sporthallen Zuid, Court 6
16 February 2012, 18:15 UTC+2

Slovenia
2

| | | | 1 | 2 | 3 |
|---|---|---|---|---|---|
| 1 | (Switzerland) (Slovenia) | Christian Bösiger; Iztok Utroša | 21; 13 | 21; 7 |
| 2 | (Switzerland) (Slovenia) | Anthony Dumartheray; Luka Petrič | 17; 21 | 18; 21 |
| 3 | (Switzerland) (Slovenia) | Nicolas Blondel; Alen Roj | 17; 21 | 19; 21 |
| 4 | (Switzerland) (Slovenia) | Thomas Heiniger / Florian Schmid; Matevž Bajuk / Aleš Murn | 21; 19 | 21; 19 |
| 5 | (Switzerland) (Slovenia) | Christian Bösiger / Gilles Tripet; Luka Petrič / Alen Roj | 21; 11 | 21; 17 |

=== England vs. Czech Republic ===
England
5
Sporthallen Zuid, Court 7
16 February 2012, 18:15 UTC+2

Czech Republic
0

| | | | 1 | 2 | 3 |
|---|---|---|---|---|---|
| 1 | (England) (Czech Republic) | Rajiv Ouseph; Jan Fröhlich | 21; 9 | 18; 21 | 21; 7 |
| 2 | (England) (Czech Republic) | Carl Baxter; Jakub Bitman | 21; 17 | 21; 7 |
| 3 | (England) (Czech Republic) | Ben Beckman; Milan Ludík | 20; 22 | 21; 15 | 21; 13 |
| 4 | (England) (Czech Republic) | Chris Langridge / Peter Mills; Jakub Bitman / Petr Koukal | 21; 12 | 21; 14 |
| 5 | (England) (Czech Republic) | Chris Adcock / Andrew Ellis; Jan Fröhlich / Milan Ludík | 21; 11 | 21; 8 |

== Group 4 ==
| Pos | Team | Pld | W | L | MF | MA | MD | GF | GA | GD | PF | PA | PD | Pts | Qualification | Russia | Bulgaria | Wales | Portugal |
|---|---|---|---|---|---|---|---|---|---|---|---|---|---|---|---|---|---|---|---|
| 1 | Russia | 3 | 3 | 0 | 14 | 1 | +13 | 30 | 1 | +29 | 651 | 390 | +261 | 3 | Knockout stage | — | 5–0 | 5–0 | 5–0 |
| 2 | Bulgaria | 3 | 2 | 1 | 11 | 4 | +7 | 17 | 14 | +3 | 560 | 545 | +15 | 2 | | | — | 5–0 | 4–1 |
| 3 | Wales | 3 | 1 | 2 | 3 | 12 | −9 | 8 | 22 | −14 | 450 | 582 | −132 | 1 | | | | — | 4–1 |
| 4 | Portugal | 3 | 0 | 3 | 2 | 13 | −11 | 4 | 22 | −18 | 382 | 526 | −144 | 0 | | | | | — |

Source: BWF

=== Wales vs. Bulgaria ===
Wales
0
Sporthallen Zuid, Court 7
14 February 2012, 18:15 UTC+2

Bulgaria
5

| | | | 1 | 2 | 3 |
|---|---|---|---|---|---|
| 1 | (Wales) (Bulgaria) | Raj Popat; Krasimir Jankov | 13; 21 | 12; 21 |
| 2 | (Wales) (Bulgaria) | Daniel Font; Stiliyan Makarski | 15; 21 | 14; 21 |
| 3 | (Wales) (Bulgaria) | Oliver Gwilt; Blagovest Kisyov | 14; 21 | 11; 21 |
| 4 | (Wales) (Bulgaria) | Daniel Font / Oliver Gwilt; Peyo Boichinov / Krasimir Jankov | 21; 15 | 13; 21 | 15; 21 |
| 5 | (Wales) (Bulgaria) | Martyn Lewis / James Phillips; Blagovest Kisyov / Stiliyan Makarski | 21; 14 | 19; 21 | 19; 21 |

=== Russia vs. Portugal ===
Russia
5
Sporthallen Zuid, Court 9
14 February 2012, 18:15 UTC+2

Portugal
0

| | | | 1 | 2 | 3 |
|---|---|---|---|---|---|
| 1 | (Russia) (Portugal) | Vladimir Ivanov; Pedro Martins | 21; 16 | 21; 12 |
| 2 | (Russia) (Portugal) | Ivan Sozonov; Fernando Silva | 21; 18 | 21; 13 |
| 3 | (Russia) (Portugal) | Vladimir Malkov; Hugo Rodrigues | 21; 14 | 21; 11 |
| 4 | (Russia) (Portugal) | Vitalij Durkin / Aleksandr Nikolaenko; Pedro Martins / Tomás Nero | 21; 10 | 21; 11 |
| 5 | (Russia) (Portugal) | Evgenij Dremin / Sergey Lunev; Fernando Silva / Hugo Rodrigues | 21; 6 | 21; 11 |

=== Russia vs. Wales ===
Russia
5
Sporthallen Zuid, Court 1
15 February 2012, 14:00 UTC+2

Wales
0

| | | | 1 | 2 | 3 |
|---|---|---|---|---|---|
| 1 | (Russia) (Wales) | Vladimir Ivanov; Raj Popat | 21; 12 | 21; 6 |
| 2 | (Russia) (Wales) | Vladimir Malkov; Daniel Font | 21; 9 | 21; 18 |
| 3 | (Russia) (Wales) | Stanislav Pukhov; Oliver Gwilt | 21; 7 | 21; 8 |
| 4 | (Russia) (Wales) | Evgenij Dremin / Sergey Lunev; Martyn Lewis / James Phillips | 21; 11 | 21; 11 |
| 5 | (Russia) (Wales) | Vladimir Ivanov / Ivan Sozonov; Daniel Font / Oliver Gwilt | 21; 13 | 21; 12 |

=== Portugal vs. Bulgaria ===
Portugal
1
Sporthallen Zuid, Court 2
15 February 2012, 14:00 UTC+2

Bulgaria
4

| | | | 1 | 2 | 3 |
|---|---|---|---|---|---|---|
| 1 | (Portugal) (Bulgaria) | Pedro Martins; Krasimir Jankov | 21; 18 | 21; 15 |
| 2 | (Portugal) (Bulgaria) | Tomás Nero; Stiliyan Makarski | 8; 21 | 17; 21 |
| 3 | (Portugal) (Bulgaria) | Hugo Rodrigues; Peyo Boichinov | 9; 21 | 14; 21 |
| 4 | (Portugal) (Bulgaria) | Pedro Martins / Hugo Rodrigues; Krasimir Jankov / Stiliyan Makarski | 20; 22 | 17; 21 |
| 5 | (Portugal) (Bulgaria) | Tomás Nero / Fernando Silva; Peyo Boichinov / Ivan Rusev | | | | w/o |

=== Russia vs. Bulgaria ===
Russia
5
Sporthallen Zuid, Court 5
16 February 2012, 10:00 UTC+2

Bulgaria
0

| | | | 1 | 2 | 3 |
|---|---|---|---|---|---|
| 1 | (Russia) (Bulgaria) | Ivan Sozonov; Peyo Boichinov | 20; 22 | 21; 13 | 21; 10 |
| 2 | (Russia) (Bulgaria) | Vladimir Malkov; Blagovest Kisyov | 22; 20 | 21; 9 |
| 3 | (Russia) (Bulgaria) | Stanislav Pukhov; Ivan Rusev | 21; 17 | 21; 12 |
| 4 | (Russia) (Bulgaria) | Vitalij Durkin / Aleksandr Nikolaenko; Krasimir Jankov / Stiliyan Makarski | 21; 19 | 21; 13 |
| 5 | (Russia) (Bulgaria) | Evgenij Dremin / Sergey Lunev; Peyo Boichinov / Ivan Rusev | 21; 15 | 21; 11 |

=== Portugal vs. Wales ===
Portugal
1
Sporthallen Zuid, Court 9
16 February 2012, 10:15 UTC+2

Wales
4

| | | | 1 | 2 | 3 |
|---|---|---|---|---|---|---|
| 1 | (Portugal) (Wales) | Pedro Martins; Raj Popat | 21; 14 | 21; 16 |
| 2 | (Portugal) (Wales) | Tomás Nero; Daniel Font | 19; 21 | 13; 21 |
| 3 | (Portugal) (Wales) | Hugo Rodrigues; Martyn Lewis | 16; 21 | 17; 21 |
| 4 | (Portugal) (Wales) | Pedro Martins / Hugo Rodrigues; Oliver Gwilt / James Phillips | 13; 21 | 13; 21 |
| 5 | (Portugal) (Wales) | Tomás Nero / Fernando Silva; Matthew Hughes / Martyn Lewis | | | | w/o |

== Group 5 ==
| Pos | Team | Pld | W | L | MF | MA | MD | GF | GA | GD | PF | PA | PD | Pts | Qualification | Netherlands | Austria | Hungary | Slovakia |
|---|---|---|---|---|---|---|---|---|---|---|---|---|---|---|---|---|---|---|---|
| 1 | Netherlands (H) | 3 | 3 | 0 | 14 | 1 | +13 | 28 | 4 | +24 | 649 | 419 | +230 | 3 | Knockout stage | — | 4–1 | 5–0 | 5–0 |
| 2 | Austria | 3 | 2 | 1 | 11 | 4 | +7 | 24 | 8 | +16 | 602 | 491 | +111 | 2 | | | — | 5–0 | 5–0 |
| 3 | Hungary | 3 | 1 | 2 | 3 | 12 | −9 | 7 | 24 | −17 | 459 | 604 | −145 | 1 | | | | — | 3–2 |
| 4 | Slovakia | 3 | 0 | 3 | 2 | 13 | −11 | 4 | 27 | −23 | 430 | 626 | −196 | 0 | | | | | — |

Source: BWF
(H) Host

=== Netherlands vs. Hungary ===
Netherlands
5
Sporthallen Zuid, Court 3
14 February 2012, 14:00 UTC+2

Hungary
0

| | | | 1 | 2 | 3 |
|---|---|---|---|---|---|
| 1 | (Netherlands) (Hungary) | Eric Pang; Henrik Tóth | 21; 8 | 21; 13 |
| 2 | (Netherlands) (Hungary) | Dicky Palyama; Márton Szatzker | 22; 20 | 21; 5 |
| 3 | (Netherlands) (Hungary) | Jordy Hilbink; Gergely Krausz | 21; 11 | 21; 19 |
| 4 | (Netherlands) (Hungary) | Jacco Arends / Jelle Maas; Kristóf Horváth / Dániel Tóth | 21; 13 | 21; 7 |
| 5 | (Netherlands) (Hungary) | Jorrit de Ruiter / Dave Khodabux; Gergely Krausz / Henrik Tóth | 21; 12 | 21; 10 |

=== Slovakia vs. Austria ===
Slovakia
0
Sporthallen Zuid, Court 8
14 February 2012, 18:15 UTC+2

Austria
5

| | | | 1 | 2 | 3 |
|---|---|---|---|---|---|
| 1 | (Slovakia) (Austria) | Jarolím Vícen; Michael Lahnsteiner | 15; 21 | 14; 21 |
| 2 | (Slovakia) (Austria) | Martin Kožár; David Obernosterer | 8; 21 | 16; 21 |
| 3 | (Slovakia) (Austria) | Marián Smrek; Luka Wraber | 8; 21 | 12; 21 |
| 4 | (Slovakia) (Austria) | Martin Kožár / Jarolím Vícen; Jürgen Koch / Peter Zauner | 14; 21 | 14; 21 |
| 5 | (Slovakia) (Austria) | Matej Hliničan / Marián Smrek; David Obernosterer / Roman Zirnwald | 13; 21 | 14; 21 |

=== Netherlands vs. Slovakia ===
Netherlands
5
Sporthallen Zuid, Court 4
15 February 2012, 18:00 UTC+2

Slovakia
0

| | | | 1 | 2 | 3 |
|---|---|---|---|---|---|
| 1 | (Netherlands) (Slovakia) | Eric Pang; Jarolím Vícen | 21; 12 | 21; 14 |
| 2 | (Netherlands) (Slovakia) | Dicky Palyama; Martin Kožár | 21; 16 | 21; 14 |
| 3 | (Netherlands) (Slovakia) | Nick Fransman; Matej Hliničan | 21; 11 | 21; 14 |
| 4 | (Netherlands) (Slovakia) | Ruud Bosch / Koen Ridder; Martin Kožár / Jarolím Vícen | 21; 9 | 21; 14 |
| 5 | (Netherlands) (Slovakia) | Jorrit de Ruiter / Dave Khodabux; Matej Hliničan / Marián Smrek | 21; 8 | 21; 7 |

=== Hungary vs. Austria ===
Hungary
0
Sporthallen Zuid, Court 8
15 February 2012, 18:15 UTC+2

Austria
5

| | | | 1 | 2 | 3 |
|---|---|---|---|---|---|
| 1 | (Hungary) (Austria) | Henrik Tóth; David Obernosterer | 16; 21 | 15; 21 |
| 2 | (Hungary) (Austria) | Márton Szatzker; Luka Wraber | 9; 21 | 17; 21 |
| 3 | (Hungary) (Austria) | Gergely Krausz; Matthias Almer | 18; 21 | 14; 21 |
| 4 | (Hungary) (Austria) | Márton Szatzker / Henrik Tóth; David Obernosterer / Roman Zirnwald | 11; 21 | 17; 21 |
| 5 | (Hungary) (Austria) | Kristóf Horváth / Gergely Krausz; Jürgen Koch / Peter Zauner | 8; 21 | 10; 21 |

=== Netherlands vs. Austria ===
Netherlands
4
Sporthallen Zuid, Court 2
16 February 2012, 14:00 UTC+2

Austria
1

| | | | 1 | 2 | 3 |
|---|---|---|---|---|---|
| 1 | (Netherlands) (Austria) | Eric Pang; David Obernosterer | 21; 9 | 21; 5 |
| 2 | (Netherlands) (Austria) | Jorrit de Ruiter / Dave Khodabux; Jürgen Koch / Peter Zauner | 23; 21 | 21; 23 | 21; 18 |
| 3 | (Netherlands) (Austria) | Dicky Palyama; Luka Wraber | 21; 10 | 21; 11 |
| 4 | (Netherlands) (Austria) | Jacco Arends / Jelle Maas; David Obernosterer / Roman Zwiebler | 14; 21 | 21; 14 | 21; 8 |
| 5 | (Netherlands) (Austria) | Nick Fransman; Matthias Almer | 13; 21 | 10; 21 |

=== Hungary vs. Slovakia ===
Hungary
3
Sporthallen Zuid, Court 9
16 February 2012, 14:15 UTC+2

Slovakia
2

| | | | 1 | 2 | 3 |
|---|---|---|---|---|---|
| 1 | (Hungary) (Slovakia) | Henrik Tóth; Jarolím Vícen | 21; 16 | 14; 21 | 17; 21 |
| 2 | (Hungary) (Slovakia) | Márton Szatzker; Martin Kožár | 21; 17 | 21; 15 |
| 3 | (Hungary) (Slovakia) | Gergely Krausz; Matej Hliničan | 21; 10 | 22; 20 |
| 4 | (Hungary) (Slovakia) | Kristóf Horváth / Gergely Krausz; Martin Kožár / Jarolím Vícen | 12; 21 | 15; 21 |
| 5 | (Hungary) (Slovakia) | Márton Szatzker / Henrik Tóth; Matej Hliničan / Marián Smrek | 21; 6 | 21; 15 |

== Group 6 ==
| Pos | Team | Pld | W | L | MF | MA | MD | GF | GA | GD | PF | PA | PD | Pts | Qualification | Poland | Spain | Belgium | Lithuania |
|---|---|---|---|---|---|---|---|---|---|---|---|---|---|---|---|---|---|---|---|
| 1 | Poland | 3 | 3 | 0 | 12 | 3 | +9 | 26 | 7 | +19 | 669 | 496 | +173 | 3 | Knockout stage | — | 3–2 | 4–1 | 5–0 |
| 2 | Spain | 3 | 2 | 1 | 11 | 4 | +7 | 20 | 11 | +9 | 593 | 519 | +74 | 2 | | | — | 4–1 | 5–0 |
| 3 | Belgium | 3 | 1 | 2 | 6 | 9 | −3 | 15 | 18 | −3 | 582 | 586 | −4 | 1 | | | | — | 4–1 |
| 4 | Lithuania | 3 | 0 | 3 | 1 | 14 | −13 | 2 | 27 | −25 | 359 | 602 | −243 | 0 | | | | | — |

Source: BWF

=== Poland vs. Belgium ===
Poland
4
Sporthallen Zuid, Court 2
14 February 2012, 10:00 UTC+2

Belgium
1

| | | | 1 | 2 | 3 |
|---|---|---|---|---|---|
| 1 | (Poland) (Belgium) | Przemysław Wacha; Yuhan Tan | 22; 24 | 19; 21 |
| 2 | (Poland) (Belgium) | Łukasz Moreń / Wojciech Szkudlarczyk; Matijs Dierickx / Freek Golinski | 21; 15 | 21; 18 |
| 3 | (Poland) (Belgium) | Hubert Pączek; Maxime Moreels | 21; 18 | 14; 21 | 21; 19 |
| 4 | (Poland) (Belgium) | Michal Łogosz / Robert Mateusiak; Nick Marcoen / Sam van den Broeck | 21; 13 | 21; 13 |
| 5 | (Poland) (Belgium) | Adrian Dziółko; Marijn Put | 21; 9 | 21; 12 |

=== Lithuania vs. Spain ===
Lithuania
0
Sporthallen Zuid, Court 8
14 February 2012, 10:15 UTC+2

Spain
5

| | | | 1 | 2 | 3 |
|---|---|---|---|---|---|---|
| 1 | (Lithuania) (Spain) | Kęstutis Navickas; Pablo Abián | | | | w/o |
| 2 | (Lithuania) (Spain) | Povilas Bartušis; Ernesto Velázquez | 7; 21 | 8; 21 |
| 3 | (Lithuania) (Spain) | Edgaras Slušnys; Víctor Martín | 21; 23 | 18; 21 |
| 4 | (Lithuania) (Spain) | Donatas Narvilas / Edgaras Slušnys; Pablo Abián / Ernesto Velázquez | 9; 21 | 13; 21 |
| 5 | (Lithuania) (Spain) | Povilas Bartušis / Alan Plavin; José Vicente Martínez / Eliezer Ojeda | 19; 21 | 11; 21 |

=== Poland vs. Lithuania ===
Poland
5
Sporthallen Zuid, Court 8
15 February 2012, 10:00 UTC+2

Lithuania
0

| | | | 1 | 2 | 3 |
|---|---|---|---|---|---|
| 1 | (Poland) (Lithuania) | Przemysław Wacha; Povilas Bartušis | 21; 8 | 21; 9 |
| 2 | (Poland) (Lithuania) | Hubert Pączek; Edgaras Slušnys | 21; 10 | 21; 7 |
| 3 | (Poland) (Lithuania) | Adrian Dziółko; Alan Plavin | 21; 10 | 21; 7 |
| 4 | (Poland) (Lithuania) | Łukasz Moreń / Wojciech Szkudlarczyk; Donatas Narvilas / Edgaras Slušnys | 21; 11 | 21; 12 |
| 5 | (Poland) (Lithuania) | Adam Cwalina / Michal Łogosz; Povilas Bartušis / Alan Plavin | 21; 11 | 21; 14 |

=== Belgium vs. Spain ===
Belgium
1
Sporthallen Zuid, Court 1
15 February 2012, 10:15 UTC+2

Spain
4

| | | | 1 | 2 | 3 |
|---|---|---|---|---|---|
| 1 | (Belgium) (Spain) | Yuhan Tan; Pablo Abián | 21; 13 | 20; 22 | 17; 21 |
| 2 | (Belgium) (Spain) | Maxime Moreels; Ernesto Velázquez | 13; 21 | 11; 21 |
| 3 | (Belgium) (Spain) | Matijs Dierickx / Freek Golinski; José Vicente Martínez / Eliezer Ojeda | 21; 19 | 21; 8 |
| 4 | (Belgium) (Spain) | Marijn Put; Víctor Martín | 13; 21 | 12; 21 |
| 5 | (Belgium) (Spain) | Nick Marcoen / Sam van den Broeck; Pablo Abián / Ernesto Velázquez | 18; 21 | 10; 21 |

=== Belgium vs. Lithuania ===
Belgium
4
Sporthallen Zuid, Court 5
16 February 2012, 14:00 UTC+2

Lithuania
1

| | | | 1 | 2 | 3 |
|---|---|---|---|---|---|
| 1 | (Belgium) (Lithuania) | Yuhan Tan; Povilas Bartušis | 21; 15 | 21; 12 |
| 2 | (Belgium) (Lithuania) | Maxime Moreels; Edgaras Slušnys | 21; 7 | 21; 8 |
| 3 | (Belgium) (Lithuania) | Marijn Put; Alan Plavin | 20; 22 | 21; 16 | 13; 21 |
| 4 | (Belgium) (Lithuania) | Matijs Dierickx / Freek Golinski; Povilas Bartušis / Alan Plavin | 21; 15 | 21; 19 |
| 5 | (Belgium) (Lithuania) | Nick Marcoen / Sam van den Broeck; Donatas Narvilas / Edgaras Slušnys | 21; 7 | 21; 12 |

=== Poland vs. Spain ===
Poland
3
Sporthallen Zuid, Court 3
16 February 2012, 18:00 UTC+2

Spain
2

| | | | 1 | 2 | 3 |
|---|---|---|---|---|---|
| 1 | (Poland) (Spain) | Przemysław Wacha; Pablo Abián | 21; 15 | 20; 22 | 18; 21 |
| 2 | (Poland) (Spain) | Hubert Pączek; Ernesto Velázquez | 9; 21 | 21; 19 | 15; 21 |
| 3 | (Poland) (Spain) | Łukasz Moreń / Wojciech Szkudlarczyk; José Vicente Martínez / Eliezer Ojeda | 21; 12 | 21; 18 |
| 4 | (Poland) (Spain) | Adrian Dziółko; Víctor Martín | 21; 10 | 27; 25 |
| 5 | (Poland) (Spain) | Michal Łogosz / Robert Mateusiak; Pablo Abián / Ernesto Velázquez | 21; 13 | 21; 17 |

== Group 7 ==
| Pos | Team | Pld | W | L | MF | MA | MD | GF | GA | GD | PF | PA | PD | Pts | Qualification | France | Italy | Croatia | Estonia |
|---|---|---|---|---|---|---|---|---|---|---|---|---|---|---|---|---|---|---|---|
| 1 | France | 3 | 3 | 0 | 13 | 2 | +11 | 27 | 5 | +22 | 645 | 440 | +205 | 3 | Knockout stage | — | 4–1 | 5–0 | 4–1 |
| 2 | Italy | 3 | 2 | 1 | 7 | 8 | −1 | 14 | 18 | −4 | 521 | 581 | −60 | 2 | | | — | 3–2 | 3–2 |
| 3 | Croatia | 3 | 1 | 2 | 5 | 10 | −5 | 11 | 21 | −10 | 513 | 595 | −82 | 1 | | | | — | 3–2 |
| 4 | Estonia | 3 | 0 | 3 | 5 | 10 | −5 | 13 | 21 | −8 | 560 | 623 | −63 | 0 | | | | | — |

Source: BWF

=== France vs. Estonia ===
France
4
Sporthallen Zuid, Court 3
14 February 2012, 18:00 UTC+2

Estonia
1

| | | | 1 | 2 | 3 |
|---|---|---|---|---|---|
| 1 | (France) (Estonia) | Brice Leverdez; Raul Must | 9; 21 | 21; 18 | 20; 22 |
| 2 | (France) (Estonia) | Ronan Labar / Mathias Quéré; Andres Aru / Ants Mängel | 21; 15 | 21; 10 |
| 3 | (France) (Estonia) | Matthieu Lo Ying Ping; Rainer Kaljumäe | 21; 7 | 21; 16 |
| 4 | (France) (Estonia) | Baptiste Carême / Brice Leverdez; Kristjan Kaljurand / Robert Kasela | 21; 10 | 21; 11 |
| 5 | (France) (Estonia) | Thomas Rouxel; Ingmar Seidelberg | 21; 18 | 21; 8 |

=== Croatia vs. Italy ===
Croatia
2
Sporthallen Zuid, Court 4
14 February 2012, 18:00 UTC+2

Italy
3

| | | | 1 | 2 | 3 |
|---|---|---|---|---|---|
| 1 | (Croatia) (Italy) | Luka Zdenjak; Rosario Maddaloni | 21; 23 | 10; 21 |
| 2 | (Croatia) (Italy) | Josip Uglešić; Giovanni Greco | 12; 21 | 17; 21 |
| 3 | (Croatia) (Italy) | Zvonimir Đurkinjak; Daniel Messersi | 21; 9 | 21; 18 |
| 4 | (Croatia) (Italy) | Josip Uglešić / Luka Zdenjak; Giacomo Battaglino / Marco Mondavio | 9; 21 | 18; 21 |
| 5 | (Croatia) (Italy) | Zvonimir Đurkinjak / Zvonimir Hölbling; Rosario Maddaloni / Daniel Messersi | 21; 13 | 21; 6 |

=== Estonia vs. Italy ===
Estonia
2
Sporthallen Zuid, Court 3
15 February 2012, 14:00 UTC+2

Italy
3

| | | | 1 | 2 | 3 |
|---|---|---|---|---|---|
| 1 | (Estonia) (Italy) | Raul Must; Rosario Maddaloni | 21; 14 | 21; 11 |
| 2 | (Estonia) (Italy) | Rainer Kaljumäe; Giovanni Greco | 10; 21 | 21; 6 | 12; 21 |
| 3 | (Estonia) (Italy) | Kristjan Kaljurand / Robert Kasela; Giacomo Battaglino / Marco Mondavio | 23; 21 | 21; 14 |
| 4 | (Estonia) (Italy) | Ingmar Seidelberg; Daniel Messersi | 16; 21 | 21; 19 | 12; 21 |
| 5 | (Estonia) (Italy) | Andres Aru / Ants Mängel; Rosario Maddaloni / Daniel Messersi | 15; 21 | 17; 21 |

=== France vs. Croatia ===
France
5
Sporthallen Zuid, Court 9
15 February 2012, 14:15 UTC+2

Croatia
0

| | | | 1 | 2 | 3 |
|---|---|---|---|---|---|
| 1 | (France) (Croatia) | Brice Leverdez; Luka Zdenjak | 21; 18 | 21; 10 |
| 2 | (France) (Croatia) | Thomas Rouxel; Josip Uglešić | 21; 8 | 21; 13 |
| 3 | (France) (Croatia) | Alexandre Françoise; Zvonimir Hölbling | 21; 14 | 21; 7 |
| 4 | (France) (Croatia) | Ronan Labar / Mathias Quéré; Josip Uglešić / Luka Zdenjak | 21; 15 | 21; 8 |
| 5 | (France) (Croatia) | Baptiste Carême / Brice Leverdez; Zvonimir Đurkinjak / Zvonimir Hölbling | 21; 18 | 17; 21 | 21; 16 |

=== Estonia vs. Croatia ===
Estonia
2
Sporthallen Zuid, Court 8
16 February 2012, 10:15 UTC+2

Croatia
3

| | | | 1 | 2 | 3 |
|---|---|---|---|---|---|
| 1 | (Estonia) (Croatia) | Raul Must; Luka Zdenjak | 21; 8 | 21; 10 |
| 2 | (Estonia) (Croatia) | Rainer Kaljumäe; Zvonimir Đurkinjak | 15; 21 | 13; 21 |
| 3 | (Estonia) (Croatia) | Robert Kasela; Zvonimir Hölbling | 17; 21 | 14; 21 |
| 4 | (Estonia) (Croatia) | Andres Aru / Ants Mängel; Zvonimir Hölbling / Luka Zdenjak | 21; 19 | 21; 12 |
| 5 | (Estonia) (Croatia) | Kristjan Kaljurand / Robert Kasela; Zvonimir Đurkinjak / Josip Uglešić | 19; 21 | 21; 19 | 11; 21 |

=== France vs. Italy ===
France
4
Sporthallen Zuid, Court 6
16 February 2012, 14:15 UTC+2

Italy
1

| | | | 1 | 2 | 3 |
|---|---|---|---|---|---|
| 1 | (France) (Italy) | Matthieu Lo Ying Ping; Rosario Maddaloni | 13; 21 | 19; 21 |
| 2 | (France) (Italy) | Thomas Rouxel; Giovanni Greco | 21; 6 | 21; 17 |
| 3 | (France) (Italy) | Alexandre Françoise; Daniel Messersi | 21; 18 | 21; 7 |
| 4 | (France) (Italy) | Ronan Labar / Mathias Quéré; Giacomo Battaglino / Marco Mondavio | 21; 8 | 21; 13 |
| 5 | (France) (Italy) | Baptiste Carême / Sylvain Grosjean; Giovanni Greco / Daniel Messersi | 21; 12 | 21; 13 |

== Group 8 ==
| Pos | Team | Pld | W | L | MF | MA | MD | GF | GA | GD | PF | PA | PD | Pts | Qualification | Ukraine | Finland | Iceland | Luxembourg |
|---|---|---|---|---|---|---|---|---|---|---|---|---|---|---|---|---|---|---|---|
| 1 | Ukraine | 3 | 3 | 0 | 13 | 2 | +11 | 28 | 5 | +23 | 660 | 492 | +168 | 3 | Knockout stage | — | 4–1 | 4–1 | 5–0 |
| 2 | Finland | 3 | 2 | 1 | 10 | 5 | +5 | 21 | 12 | +9 | 642 | 498 | +144 | 2 | | | — | 4–1 | 5–0 |
| 3 | Iceland | 3 | 1 | 2 | 5 | 10 | −5 | 12 | 21 | −9 | 547 | 623 | −76 | 1 | | | | — | 3–2 |
| 4 | Luxembourg | 3 | 0 | 3 | 2 | 13 | −11 | 4 | 27 | −23 | 404 | 640 | −236 | 0 | | | | | — |

Source: BWF

=== Ukraine vs. Iceland ===
Ukraine
4
Sporthallen Zuid, Court 5
14 February 2012, 18:00 UTC+2

Iceland
1

| | | | 1 | 2 | 3 |
|---|---|---|---|---|---|
| 1 | (Ukraine) (Iceland) | Dmytro Zavadsky; Atli Jóhannesson | 21; 9 | 21; 13 |
| 2 | (Ukraine) (Iceland) | Valeriy Atrashchenkov; Kári Gunnarsson | 21; 10 | 21; 18 |
| 3 | (Ukraine) (Iceland) | Vitaly Konov; Egill Guðlaugsson | 21; 11 | 21; 13 |
| 4 | (Ukraine) (Iceland) | Gennadiy Natarov / Artem Pochtarov; Magnús Ingi Helgason / Helgi Jóhannesson | 14; 21 | 21; 19 | 18; 21 |
| 5 | (Ukraine) (Iceland) | Vitaly Konov / Dmytro Zavadsky; Kári Gunnarsson / Kári Gunnarsson | 21; 10 | 21; 17 |

=== Luxembourg vs. Finland ===
Luxembourg
0
Sporthallen Zuid, Court 6
14 February 2012, 18:00 UTC+2

Finland
5

| | | | 1 | 2 | 3 |
|---|---|---|---|---|---|
| 1 | (Luxembourg) (Finland) | Robert Mann; Ville Lång | 5; 21 | 16; 21 |
| 2 | (Luxembourg) (Finland) | Yann Hellers; Eetu Heino | 14; 21 | 16; 21 |
| 3 | (Luxembourg) (Finland) | Mike Vallenthini; Kalle Koljonen | 10; 21 | 6; 21 |
| 4 | (Luxembourg) (Finland) | Yann Hellers / Eric Solagna; Eetu Heino / Oskari Saarinen | 9; 21 | 9; 21 |
| 5 | (Luxembourg) (Finland) | Akis Thomas / Mike Vallenthini; Ville Lång / Mikko Vikman | 10; 21 | 9; 21 |

=== Iceland vs. Finland ===
Iceland
1
Sporthallen Zuid, Court 6
15 February 2012, 14:15 UTC+2

Finland
4

| | | | 1 | 2 | 3 |
|---|---|---|---|---|---|
| 1 | (Iceland) (Finland) | Atli Jóhannesson; Ville Lång | 12; 21 | 10; 21 |
| 2 | (Iceland) (Finland) | Magnús Ingi Helgason; Eetu Heino | 5; 21 | 12; 21 |
| 3 | (Iceland) (Finland) | Kári Gunnarsson; Kalle Koljonen | 17; 21 | 21; 11 | 20; 22 |
| 4 | (Iceland) (Finland) | Magnús Ingi Helgason / Helgi Jóhannesson; Eetu Heino / Oskari Saarinen | 21; 19 | 21; 17 |
| 5 | (Iceland) (Finland) | Kári Gunnarsson / Atli Jóhannesson; Ville Lång / Mikko Vikman | 18; 21 | 8; 21 |

=== Ukraine vs. Luxembourg ===
Ukraine
5
Sporthallen Zuid, Court 6
15 February 2012, 18:15 UTC+2

Luxembourg
0

| | | | 1 | 2 | 3 |
|---|---|---|---|---|---|
| 1 | (Ukraine) (Luxembourg) | Dmytro Zavadsky; Robert Mann | 21; 3 | 21; 16 |
| 2 | (Ukraine) (Luxembourg) | Valeriy Atrashchenkov; Yann Hellers | 21; 14 | 21; 16 |
| 3 | (Ukraine) (Luxembourg) | Artem Pochtarov; Mike Vallenthini | 21; 19 | 21; 16 |
| 4 | (Ukraine) (Luxembourg) | Gennadiy Natarov / Dmytro Zavadsky; Yann Hellers / Eric Solagna | 21; 7 | 21; 11 |
| 5 | (Ukraine) (Luxembourg) | Vladislav Druzchenko / Vitaly Konov; Akis Thomas / Mike Vallenthini | 21; 7 | 21; 5 |

=== Ukraine vs. Finland ===
Ukraine
4
Sporthallen Zuid, Court 2
16 February 2012, 18:00 UTC+2

Finland
1

| | | | 1 | 2 | 3 |
|---|---|---|---|---|---|
| 1 | (Ukraine) (Finland) | Dmytro Zavadsky; Ville Lång | 21; 12 | 21; 16 |
| 2 | (Ukraine) (Finland) | Valeriy Atrashchenkov; Eetu Heino | 21; 19 | 4; 21 | 19; 21 |
| 3 | (Ukraine) (Finland) | Vladislav Druzchenko; Kalle Koljonen | 21; 13 | 21; 19 |
| 4 | (Ukraine) (Finland) | Vitaly Konov / Dmytro Zavadsky; Eetu Heino / Oskari Saarinen | 21; 19 | 21; 19 |
| 5 | (Ukraine) (Finland) | Valeriy Atrashchenkov / Vladislav Druzchenko; Ville Lång / Mikko Vikman | 21; 17 | 17; 21 | 21; 19 |

=== Iceland vs. Luxembourg ===
Iceland
3
Sporthallen Zuid, Court 5
16 February 2012, 18:00 UTC+2

Luxembourg
2

| | | | 1 | 2 | 3 |
|---|---|---|---|---|---|
| 1 | (Iceland) (Luxembourg) | Atli Jóhannesson; Robert Mann | 18; 21 | 29; 27 | 11; 21 |
| 2 | (Iceland) (Luxembourg) | Magnús Ingi Helgason; Yann Hellers | 21; 14 | 21; 10 |
| 3 | (Iceland) (Luxembourg) | Egill Guðlaugsson; Mike Vallenthini | 18; 21 | 18; 21 |
| 4 | (Iceland) (Luxembourg) | Magnús Ingi Helgason / Helgi Jóhannesson; Yann Hellers / Eric Solagna | 21; 13 | 21; 14 |
| 5 | (Iceland) (Luxembourg) | Egill Guðlaugsson / Atli Jóhannesson; Akis Thomas / Mike Vallenthini | 21; 12 | 21; 12 |
