= 2012 European Women's Team Badminton Championships group stage =

This article lists the full results for group stage of 2012 European Women's Team Badminton Championships. The group stage was held from 14 to 16 February 2012.

== Group 1 ==
Pos	Team	Pld	W	L	MF	MA	MD	GF	GA	GD	PF	PA	PD	Pts	Qualification	Denmark	Spain	Poland
1	Denmark	2	2	0	7	2	+5	16	9	+7	496	408	+88	2	Knockout stage	—	3–2	4–1
2	Spain	2	1	1	4	5	−1	12	12	0	419	447	−28	1			—	3–2
3	Poland	2	0	2	3	7	−4	9	16	−7	430	490	−60	0				—

Source: BWF

=== Poland vs. Spain ===
Poland
2
Sporthallen Zuid, Court 1
14 February 2012, 14:00 UTC+2

Spain
3

			1	2	3
1	(Poland) (Spain)	Kamila Augustyn; Carolina Marín	15; 21	21; 19	16; 21
2	(Poland) (Spain)	Agata Świst; Beatriz Corrales	7; 21	12; 21
3	(Poland) (Spain)	Anna Narel; Laura Molina	21; 14	18; 21	21; 18
4	(Poland) (Spain)	Kamila Augustyn / Agnieszka Wojtkowska; Noelia Jiménez / Laura Molina	21; 16	21; 15
5	(Poland) (Spain)	Anna Narel / Natalia Pocztowiak; Beatriz Corrales / Carolina Marín	20; 22	18; 21

=== Denmark vs. Poland ===
Denmark
4
Sporthallen Zuid, Court 3
15 February 2012, 18:00 UTC+2

Poland
1

			1	2	3
1	(Denmark) (Poland)	Karina Jørgensen; Agata Świst	21; 15	19; 21	21; 16
2	(Denmark) (Poland)	Camilla Sørensen; Anna Narel	21; 15	15; 21	19; 21
3	(Denmark) (Poland)	Line Kjærsfeldt; Natalia Pocztowiak	21; 16	21; 17
4	(Denmark) (Poland)	Maria Helsbøl / Camilla Sørensen; Anna Narel / Agata Świst	21; 19	21; 14
5	(Denmark) (Poland)	Line Damkjær Kruse / Marie Røpke; Natalia Pocztowiak / Agnieszka Wojtkowska	18; 21	21; 11	21; 12

=== Denmark vs. Spain ===
Denmark
3
Sporthallen Zuid, Court 3
16 February 2012, 14:00 UTC+2

Spain
2

			1	2	3
1	(Denmark) (Spain)	Tine Baun; Carolina Marín	21; 18	18; 21	18; 21
2	(Denmark) (Spain)	Karina Jørgensen; Beatriz Corrales	17; 21	21; 16	21; 14
3	(Denmark) (Spain)	Line Kjærsfeldt; Laura Molina	21; 8	21; 8
4	(Denmark) (Spain)	Line Damkjær Kruse / Marie Røpke; Noelia Jiménez / Laura Molina	21; 9	21; 11
5	(Denmark) (Spain)	Maria Helsbøl / Line Kjærsfeldt; Beatriz Corrales / Carolina Marín	18; 21	18; 21

== Group 2 ==
Pos	Team	Pld	W	L	MF	MA	MD	GF	GA	GD	PF	PA	PD	Pts	Qualification	Germany	Belarus	Cyprus
1	Germany	2	2	0	9	1	+8	19	3	+16	445	232	+213	2	Knockout stage	—	4–1	5–0
2	Belarus	2	1	1	4	6	−2	10	13	−3	327	416	−89	1			—	3–2
3	Cyprus	2	0	2	2	8	−6	4	17	−13	282	406	−124	0				—

Source: BWF

=== Cyprus vs. Belarus ===
Cyprus
2
Sporthallen Zuid, Court 9
14 February 2012, 10:15 UTC+2

Belarus
3

			1	2	3
1	(Cyprus) (Belarus)	Stella Knekna; Alesia Zaitsava	12; 21	12; 21
2	(Cyprus) (Belarus)	Dometia Ioannou; Elena Lukashevich	21; 7	21; 23	21; 7
3	(Cyprus) (Belarus)	Stephanie Pinharry; Vlada Chernyavskaya	13; 21	14; 21
4	(Cyprus) (Belarus)	Maria Avraamidou / Stella Knekna; Anastasiya Cherniavskaya / Elena Lukashevich	21; 15	21; 18
5	(Cyprus) (Belarus)	Dometia Ioannou / Stephanie Pinharry; Vlada Chernyavskaya / Alesia Zaitsava	10; 21	15; 21

=== Germany vs. Cyprus ===
Germany
5
Sporthallen Zuid, Court 5
15 February 2012, 14:00 UTC+2

Cyprus
0

			1	2	3
1	(Germany) (Cyprus)	Juliane Schenk; Stella Knekna	21; 12	21; 15
2	(Germany) (Cyprus)	Olga Konon; Dometia Ioannou	21; 4	21; 11
3	(Germany) (Cyprus)	Fabienne Deprez; Stephanie Pinharry	21; 9	21; 7
4	(Germany) (Cyprus)	Johanna Goliszewski / Carla Nelte; Maria Avraamidou / Stella Knekna	21; 9	21; 12
5	(Germany) (Cyprus)	Isabel Herttrich / Karin Schnaase; Dometia Ioannou / Stephanie Pinharry	21; 12	21; 10

=== Germany vs. Belarus ===
Germany
4
Sporthallen Zuid, Court 4
16 February 2012, 10:00 UTC+2

Belarus
1

			1	2	3
1	(Germany) (Belarus)	Juliane Schenk; Alesia Zaitsava	21; 11	9; 21	21; 8
2	(Germany) (Belarus)	Karin Schnaase; Anastasiya Cherniavskaya	21; 8	21; 2
3	(Germany) (Belarus)	Fabienne Deprez; Elena Lukashevich	21; 12	21; 3
4	(Germany) (Belarus)	Isabel Herttrich / Carla Nelte; Vlada Chernyavskaya / Alesia Zaitsava	21; 8	18; 21	19; 21
5	(Germany) (Belarus)	Sandra Marinello / Birgit Michels; Anastasiya Cherniavskaya / Elena Lukashevich	21; 10	21; 6

== Group 3 ==
Pos	Team	Pld	W	L	MF	MA	MD	GF	GA	GD	PF	PA	PD	Pts	Qualification	Netherlands	Sweden	Hungary
1	Netherlands (H)	2	2	0	10	0	+10	20	2	+18	456	264	+192	2	Knockout stage	—	5–0	5–0
2	Sweden	2	1	1	3	7	−4	9	14	−5	356	405	−49	1			—	3–2
3	Hungary	2	0	2	2	8	−6	4	17	−13	262	405	−143	0				—

Source: BWF
(H) Host

=== Hungary vs. Sweden ===
Hungary
2
Sporthallen Zuid, Court 6
14 February 2012, 10:15 UTC+2

Sweden
3

			1	2	3
1	(Hungary) (Sweden)	Orsolya Varga; Jenny Wan	21; 17	21; 12
2	(Hungary) (Sweden)	Regina Zsófia Zsigmond; Ellinor Widh	13; 21	16; 21
3	(Hungary) (Sweden)	Laura Sárosi; Karolina Kotte	21; 14	16; 21	21; 5
4	(Hungary) (Sweden)	Sára Fekete / Zsófia Horváth; Emelie Lennartsson / Emma Wengberg	4; 21	5; 21
5	(Hungary) (Sweden)	Laura Sárosi / Regina Zsófia Zsigmond; Sanne Ekberg / Amanda Högström	11; 21	10; 21

=== Netherlands vs. Hungary ===
Netherlands
5
Sporthallen Zuid, Court 4
15 February 2012, 14:00 UTC+2

Hungary
0

			1	2	3
1	(Netherlands) (Hungary)	Judith Meulendijks; Orsolya Varga	21; 4	21; 5
2	(Netherlands) (Hungary)	Patty Stolzenbach; Regina Zsófia Zsigmond	21; 9	21; 13
3	(Netherlands) (Hungary)	Lotte Jonathans / Paulien van Dooremalen; Sára Fekete / Zsófia Horváth	21; 14	21; 11
4	(Netherlands) (Hungary)	Soraya de Visch Eijbergen; Laura Sárosi	21; 19	21; 19
5	(Netherlands) (Hungary)	Samantha Barning / Ilse Vaessen; Orsolya Varga / Regina Zsófia Zsigmond	21; 1	21; 8

=== Netherlands vs. Sweden ===
Netherlands
5
Sporthallen Zuid, Court 1
16 February 2012, 18:00 UTC+2

Sweden
0

			1	2	3
1	(Netherlands) (Sweden)	Judith Meulendijks; Jenny Wan	21; 8	21; 6
2	(Netherlands) (Sweden)	Selena Piek / Iris Tabeling; Sanne Ekberg / Amanda Högström	21; 10	21; 14
3	(Netherlands) (Sweden)	Patty Stolzenbach; Ellinor Widh	19; 21	21; 4	21; 14
4	(Netherlands) (Sweden)	Lotte Jonathans / Paulien van Dooremalen; Emelie Lennartsson / Emma Wengberg	17; 21	21; 16	21; 19
5	(Netherlands) (Sweden)	Soraya de Visch Eijbergen; Amanda Högström	21; 16	21; 12

== Group 4 ==
Pos	Team	Pld	W	L	MF	MA	MD	GF	GA	GD	PF	PA	PD	Pts	Qualification	Russia	Slovenia	Ireland	Slovakia
1	Russia	3	3	0	14	1	+13	29	2	+27	639	356	+283	3	Knockout stage	—	5–0	4–1	5–0
2	Slovenia	3	2	1	8	7	+1	17	15	+2	528	568	−40	2			—	3–2	5–0
3	Ireland	3	1	2	6	9	−3	14	21	−7	610	620	−10	1				—	3–2
4	Slovakia	3	0	3	2	13	−11	5	27	−22	414	647	−233	0					—

Source: BWF

=== Ireland vs. Slovenia ===
Ireland
2
Sporthallen Zuid, Court 3
14 February 2012, 10:00 UTC+2

Slovenia
3

			1	2	3
1	(Republic of Ireland) (Slovenia)	Chloe Magee; Maja Tvrdy	21; 19	20; 22	21; 14
2	(Republic of Ireland) (Slovenia)	Sinead Chambers; Špela Silvester	19; 21	20; 22
3	(Republic of Ireland) (Slovenia)	Alannah Stephenson; Kaja Stanković	21; 18	13; 21	18; 21
4	(Republic of Ireland) (Slovenia)	Sinead Chambers / Jennie King; Tina Kodrič / Špela Silvester	11; 21	18; 21
5	(Republic of Ireland) (Slovenia)	Chloe Magee / Alannah Stephenson; Kaja Stanković / Maja Tvrdy	21; 13	21; 11

=== Russia vs. Slovakia ===
Russia
5
Sporthallen Zuid, Court 5
14 February 2012, 10:00 UTC+2

Slovakia
0

			1	2	3
1	(Russia) (Slovakia)	Anastasia Prokopenko; Jana Čižnárová	21; 9	21; 9
2	(Russia) (Slovakia)	Ella Diehl; Zuzana Orlovská	21; 16	22; 20
3	(Russia) (Slovakia)	Romina Gabdullina; Martina Repiská	21; 6	21; 13
4	(Russia) (Slovakia)	Anastasiia Akchurina / Tatjana Bibik; Barbora Bobrovská / Zuzana Orlovská	21; 9	21; 6
5	(Russia) (Slovakia)	Valeria Sorokina / Nina Vislova; Jana Čižnárová / Martina Repiská	21; 6	21; 8

=== Slovakia vs. Slovenia ===
Slovakia
0
Sporthallen Zuid, Court 9
15 February 2012, 10:15 UTC+2

Slovenia
5

			1	2	3
1	(Slovakia) (Slovenia)	Jana Čižnárová; Maja Tvrdy	12; 21	16; 21
2	(Slovakia) (Slovenia)	Zuzana Orlovská; Špela Silvester	7; 21	9; 21
3	(Slovakia) (Slovenia)	Martina Repiská; Tina Kodrič	17; 21	23; 25
4	(Slovakia) (Slovenia)	Barbora Bobrovská / Zuzana Orlovská; Nika Končut / Kaja Stanković	15; 21	7; 21
5	(Slovakia) (Slovenia)	Jana Čižnárová / Martina Repiská; Tina Kodrič / Špela Silvester	15; 21	13; 21

=== Russia vs. Ireland ===
Russia
4
Sporthallen Zuid, Court 7
15 February 2012, 18:15 UTC+2

Ireland
1

			1	2	3
1	(Russia) (Republic of Ireland)	Anastasia Prokopenko; Chloe Magee	19; 21	21; 19	10; 21
2	(Russia) (Republic of Ireland)	Tatjana Bibik; Sinead Chambers	21; 6	21; 12
3	(Russia) (Republic of Ireland)	Romina Gabdullina; Alannah Stephenson	21; 10	21; 18
4	(Russia) (Republic of Ireland)	Tatjana Bibik / Valeria Sorokina; Sinead Chambers / Jennie King	21; 18	21; 5
5	(Russia) (Republic of Ireland)	Anastasiia Akchurina / Nina Vislova; Chloe Magee / Alannah Stephenson	21; 15	21; 19

=== Russia vs. Slovenia ===
Russia
5
Sporthallen Zuid, Court 7
16 February 2012, 14:15 UTC+2

Slovenia
0

			1	2	3
1	(Russia) (Slovenia)	Anastasia Prokopenko; Maja Tvrdy	21; 8	21; 7
2	(Russia) (Slovenia)	Tatjana Bibik; Špela Silvester	21; 18	21; 3
3	(Russia) (Slovenia)	Anastasiia Akchurina / Nina Vislova; Nika Končut / Kaja Stanković	21; 7	21; 16
4	(Russia) (Slovenia)	Romina Gabdullina; Kaja Stanković	21; 6	21; 9
5	(Russia) (Slovenia)	Anastasia Prokopenko / Valeria Sorokina; Špela Silvester / Maja Tvrdy	21; 8	21; 8

=== Slovakia vs. Ireland ===
Slovakia
2
Sporthallen Zuid, Court 9
16 February 2012, 18:15 UTC+2

Ireland
3

			1	2	3
1	(Slovakia) (Republic of Ireland)	Jana Čižnárová; Chloe Magee	10; 21	6; 21
2	(Slovakia) (Republic of Ireland)	Zuzana Orlovská; Jennie King	21; 9	21; 13
3	(Slovakia) (Republic of Ireland)	Martina Repiská; Alannah Stephenson	14; 21	21; 18	21; 16
4	(Slovakia) (Republic of Ireland)	Jana Čižnárová / Martina Repiská; Sinead Chambers / Jennie King	21; 19	12; 21	14; 21
5	(Slovakia) (Republic of Ireland)	Barbora Bobrovská / Zuzana Orlovská; Chloe Magee / Alannah Stephenson	10; 21	7; 21

== Group 5 ==
Pos	Team	Pld	W	L	MF	MA	MD	GF	GA	GD	PF	PA	PD	Pts	Qualification	Bulgaria	Finland	Estonia	Portugal
1	Bulgaria	3	3	0	15	0	+15	30	0	+30	632	315	+317	3	Knockout stage	—	5–0	5–0	5–0
2	Finland	3	2	1	7	8	−1	16	17	−1	561	561	0	2			—	4–1	3–2
3	Estonia	3	1	2	5	10	−5	10	22	−12	497	622	−125	1				—	4–1
4	Portugal	3	0	3	3	12	−9	7	24	−17	410	602	−192	0					—

Source: BWF

=== Bulgaria vs. Portugal ===
Bulgaria
5
Sporthallen Zuid, Court 4
14 February 2012, 10:00 UTC+2

Portugal
0

			1	2	3
1	(Bulgaria) (Portugal)	Petya Nedelcheva; Telma Santos	21; 12	21; 9
2	(Bulgaria) (Portugal)	Linda Zetchiri; Helena Pestana	21; 8	21; 11
3	(Bulgaria) (Portugal)	Stefani Stoeva; Sónia Gonçalves	21; 11	21; 10
4	(Bulgaria) (Portugal)	Dimitria Popstoikova / Gabriela Stoeva; Helena Pestana / Telma Santos	21; 5	21; 14
5	(Bulgaria) (Portugal)	Diana Dimova / Petya Nedelcheva; Sónia Gonçalves / Sofia Setim	21; 5	21; 3

=== Estonia vs. Finland ===
Estonia
1
Sporthallen Zuid, Court 5
14 February 2012, 14:00 UTC+2

Finland
4

			1	2	3
1	(Estonia) (Finland)	Laura Vana; Nanna Vainio	19; 21	15; 21
2	(Estonia) (Finland)	Getter Saar; Airi Mikkelä	22; 20	13; 21	21; 15
3	(Estonia) (Finland)	Kristin Kuuba; Sanni Rautala	18; 21	21; 19	12; 21
4	(Estonia) (Finland)	Kertu Margus / Grete Talviste; Airi Mikkelä / Nanna Vainio	17; 21	16; 21
5	(Estonia) (Finland)	Kristin Kuuba / Helina Rüütel; Mathilda Lindholm / Jenny Nyström	14; 21	8; 21

=== Portugal vs. Finland ===
Portugal
2
Sporthallen Zuid, Court 6
15 February 2012, 10:15 UTC+2

Finland
3

			1	2	3
1	(Portugal) (Finland)	Telma Santos; Anu Nieminen	21; 9	21; 2
2	(Portugal) (Finland)	Sofia Setim; Nanna Vainio	6; 21	6; 21
3	(Portugal) (Finland)	Sónia Gonçalves; Airi Mikkelä	3; 21	12; 21
4	(Portugal) (Finland)	Helena Pestana / Telma Santos; Mathilda Lindholm / Jenny Nyström	18; 21	23; 21	22; 20
5	(Portugal) (Finland)	Sónia Gonçalves / Sofia Setim; Sanni Rautala / Nanna Vainio	11; 21	10; 21

=== Bulgaria vs. Estonia ===
Bulgaria
5
Sporthallen Zuid, Court 7
15 February 2012, 10:15 UTC+2

Estonia
0

			1	2	3
1	(Bulgaria) (Estonia)	Petya Nedelcheva; Laura Vana	21; 11	21; 10
2	(Bulgaria) (Estonia)	Diana Dimova / Dimitria Popstoikova; Kristin Kuuba / Helina Rüütel	21; 9	21; 11
3	(Bulgaria) (Estonia)	Linda Zetchiri; Getter Saar	21; 14	21; 16
4	(Bulgaria) (Estonia)	Gabriela Stoeva / Stefani Stoeva; Kertu Margus / Grete Talviste	21; 6	21; 13
5	(Bulgaria) (Estonia)	Stefani Stoeva; Kristin Kuuba	21; 14	21; 4

=== Bulgaria vs. Finland ===
Bulgaria
5
Sporthallen Zuid, Court 1
16 February 2012, 14:00 UTC+2

Finland
0

			1	2	3
1	(Bulgaria) (Finland)	Petya Nedelcheva; Nanna Vainio	21; 9	23; 21
2	(Bulgaria) (Finland)	Linda Zetchiri; Airi Mikkelä	21; 9	21; 15
3	(Bulgaria) (Finland)	Stefani Stoeva; Sanni Rautala	21; 12	21; 10
4	(Bulgaria) (Finland)	Dimitria Popstoikova / Gabriela Stoeva; Mathilda Lindholm / Jenny Nyström	21; 13	21; 12
5	(Bulgaria) (Finland)	Diana Dimova / Petya Nedelcheva; Sanni Rautala / Nanna Vainio	21; 11	21; 7

=== Portugal vs. Estonia ===
Portugal
1
Sporthallen Zuid, Court 8
16 February 2012, 18:15 UTC+2

Estonia
4

			1	2	3
1	(Portugal) (Estonia)	Telma Santos; Laura Vana	16; 21	21; 16	21; 11
2	(Portugal) (Estonia)	Sofia Setim; Getter Saar	7; 21	17; 21
3	(Portugal) (Estonia)	Sónia Gonçalves; Kristin Kuuba	21; 16	16; 21	9; 21
4	(Portugal) (Estonia)	Helena Pestana / Telma Santos; Kertu Margus / Grete Talviste				w/o
5	(Portugal) (Estonia)	Sónia Gonçalves / Sofia Setim; Kristin Kuuba / Helina Rüütel	20; 22	21; 23

== Group 6 ==
Pos	Team	Pld	W	L	MF	MA	MD	GF	GA	GD	PF	PA	PD	Pts	Qualification	Switzerland	England	Scotland	Italy
1	Switzerland	3	3	0	10	5	+5	20	10	+10	558	445	+113	3	Knockout stage	—	3–2	3–2	4–1
2	England	3	2	1	9	6	+3	18	13	+5	558	490	+68	2			—	3–2	4–1
3	Scotland	3	1	2	8	7	+1	19	14	+5	603	520	+83	1				—	4–1
4	Italy	3	0	3	3	12	−9	6	26	−20	365	629	−264	0					—

Source: BWF

=== England vs. Scotland ===
England
3
Sporthallen Zuid, Court 2
14 February 2012, 14:00 UTC+2

Scotland
2

			1	2	3
1	(England) (Scotland)	Nicola Cerfontyne; Susan Egelstaff	7; 21	10; 21
2	(England) (Scotland)	Sarah Walker; Kirsty Gilmour	9; 21	20; 22
3	(England) (Scotland)	Kate Robertshaw; Linda Sloan	17; 21	21; 12	26; 24
4	(England) (Scotland)	Jenny Wallwork / Gabby White; Kirsty Gilmour / Yuan Wemyss	21; 12	22; 20
5	(England) (Scotland)	Mariana Agathangelou / Heather Olver; Jillie Cooper / Linda Sloan	21; 18	21; 12

=== Italy vs. Switzerland ===
Italy
1
Sporthallen Zuid, Court 6
14 February 2012, 14:15 UTC+2

Switzerland
4

			1	2	3
1	(Italy) (Switzerland)	Agnese Allegrini; Jeanine Cicognini	23; 21	21; 9
2	(Italy) (Switzerland)	Claudia Gruber; Sabrina Jaquet	9; 21	3; 21
3	(Italy) (Switzerland)	Silvia Corradi; Nicole Schaller	13; 21	9; 21
4	(Italy) (Switzerland)	Anna Boveri / Silvia Corradi; Sanya Herzig / Sabrina Jaquet	7; 21	13; 21
5	(Italy) (Switzerland)	Claudia Gruber / Tanja Scanferla; Ayla Huser / Nicole Schaller	6; 21	10; 21

=== Scotland vs. Switzerland ===
Scotland
2
Sporthallen Zuid, Court 2
15 February 2012, 10:00 UTC+2

Switzerland
3

			1	2	3
1	(Scotland) (Switzerland)	Susan Egelstaff; Jeanine Cicognini	21; 13	21; 18
2	(Scotland) (Switzerland)	Kirsty Gilmour; Sabrina Jaquet	15; 21	21; 14	14; 21
3	(Scotland) (Switzerland)	Linda Sloan; Nicole Schaller	12; 21	10; 21
4	(Scotland) (Switzerland)	Kirsty Gilmour / Yuan Wemyss; Jeanine Cicognini / Sabrina Jaquet	15; 21	16; 21
5	(Scotland) (Switzerland)	Jillie Cooper / Linda Sloan; Marion Gruber / Sanya Herzig	21; 15	21; 13

=== England vs. Italy ===
England
4
Sporthallen Zuid, Court 4
15 February 2012, 10:00 UTC+2

Italy
1

			1	2	3
1	(England) (Italy)	Sarah Walker; Agnese Allegrini	21; 18	15; 21	15; 21
2	(England) (Italy)	Panuga Riou; Claudia Gruber	21; 12	21; 13
3	(England) (Italy)	Kate Robertshaw; Silvia Corradi	21; 9	21; 10
4	(England) (Italy)	Alexandra Langley / Lauren Smith; Claudia Gruber / Tanja Scanferla	21; 7	21; 7
5	(England) (Italy)	Mariana Agathangelou / Heather Olver; Anna Boveri / Silvia Corradi	21; 3	21; 4

=== England vs. Switzerland ===
England
2
Sporthallen Zuid, Court 2
16 February 2012, 10:00 UTC+2

Switzerland
3

			1	2	3
1	(England) (Switzerland)	Nicola Cerfontyne; Jeanine Cicognini	14; 21	12; 21
2	(England) (Switzerland)	Sarah Walker; Sabrina Jaquet	22; 20	19; 21	7; 21
3	(England) (Switzerland)	Mariana Agathangelou / Heather Olver; Marion Gruber / Sanya Herzig	21; 7	21; 8
4	(England) (Switzerland)	Kate Robertshaw; Nicole Schaller	15; 21	13; 21
5	(England) (Switzerland)	Jenny Wallwork / Gabby White; Jeanine Cicognini / Sabrina Jaquet				w/o

=== Scotland vs. Italy ===
Scotland
4
Sporthallen Zuid, Court 6
16 February 2012, 10:15 UTC+2

Italy
1

			1	2	3
1	(Scotland) (Italy)	Susan Egelstaff; Agnese Allegrini	11; 21	21; 17	12; 21
2	(Scotland) (Italy)	Kirsty Gilmour; Claudia Gruber	21; 9	21; 5
3	(Scotland) (Italy)	Linda Sloan; Anna Boveri	21; 8	21; 9
4	(Scotland) (Italy)	Jillie Cooper / Yuan Wemyss; Anna Boveri / Silvia Corradi	21; 9	21; 6
5	(Scotland) (Italy)	Kirsty Gilmour / Linda Sloan; Claudia Gruber / Tanja Scanferla	21; 13	21; 8

== Group 7 ==
Pos	Team	Pld	W	L	MF	MA	MD	GF	GA	GD	PF	PA	PD	Pts	Qualification	France	Belgium	Wales	Iceland
1	France	3	3	0	12	3	+9	26	8	+18	679	526	+153	3	Knockout stage	—	4–1	4–1	4–1
2	Belgium	3	2	1	8	7	+1	18	17	+1	645	654	−9	2			—	4–1	3–2
3	Wales	3	1	2	5	10	−5	13	23	−10	610	688	−78	1				—	3–2
4	Iceland	3	0	3	5	10	−5	11	20	−9	532	598	−66	0					—

Source: BWF

=== Iceland vs. Belgium ===
Iceland
2
Sporthallen Zuid, Court 4
14 February 2012, 14:00 UTC+2

Belgium
3

			1	2	3
1	(Iceland) (Belgium)	Ragna Ingólfsdóttir; Lianne Tan	13; 21	17; 21
2	(Iceland) (Belgium)	Tinna Helgadóttir; Sabine Devooght	21; 17	21; 13
3	(Iceland) (Belgium)	Snjólaug Jóhannsdóttir; Flore Vandenhoucke	19; 21	20; 22
4	(Iceland) (Belgium)	Tinna Helgadóttir / Ragna Ingólfsdóttir; Steffi Annys / Séverine Corvilain	21; 11	23; 21
5	(Iceland) (Belgium)	Snjólaug Jóhannsdóttir / Karitas Ósk Ólafsdóttir; Janne Elst / Jelske Snoeck	14; 21	12; 21

=== France vs. Wales ===
France
4
Sporthallen Zuid, Court 9
14 February 2012, 14:15 UTC+2

Wales
1

			1	2	3
1	(France) (Wales)	Pi Hongyan; Sarah Thomas	21; 11	21; 9
2	(France) (Wales)	Perrine Le Buhanic; Carissa Turner	21; 10	18; 21	24; 22
3	(France) (Wales)	Delphine Lansac; Vikki Jones	21; 12	21; 11
4	(France) (Wales)	Audrey Fontaine / Émilie Lefel; Sarah Thomas / Carissa Turner	21; 15	21; 8
5	(France) (Wales)	Lorraine Baumann / Léa Palermo; Bethan Higginson / Vikki Jones	14; 21	21; 6	16; 21

=== France vs. Iceland ===
France
4
Sporthallen Zuid, Court 1
15 February 2012, 10:00 UTC+2

Iceland
1

			1	2	3
1	(France) (Iceland)	Pi Hongyan; Ragna Ingólfsdóttir	21; 19	21; 18
2	(France) (Iceland)	Perrine Le Buhanic; Snjólaug Jóhannsdóttir	21; 10	21; 11
3	(France) (Iceland)	Audrey Fontaine / Émilie Lefel; Tinna Helgadóttir / Ragna Ingólfsdóttir	16; 21	12; 21
4	(France) (Iceland)	Marie Batomene; Rakel Jóhannesdóttir	21; 9	21; 8
5	(France) (Iceland)	Lorraine Baumann / Léa Palermo; Snjólaug Jóhannsdóttir / Karitas Ósk Ólafsdóttir	21; 13	21; 17

=== Wales vs. Belgium ===
Wales
1
Sporthallen Zuid, Court 3
15 February 2012, 10:00 UTC+2

Belgium
4

			1	2	3
1	(Wales) (Belgium)	Sarah Thomas; Lianne Tan	7; 21	9; 21
2	(Wales) (Belgium)	Carissa Turner; Sabine Devooght	19; 21	21; 13	20; 22
3	(Wales) (Belgium)	Vikki Jones; Flore Vandenhoucke	18; 21	21; 7	21; 23
4	(Wales) (Belgium)	Sarah Thomas / Carissa Turner; Steffi Annys / Séverine Corvilain	21; 23	21; 18	21; 12
5	(Wales) (Belgium)	Bethan Higginson / Vikki Jones; Janne Elst / Jelske Snoeck	12; 21	19; 21

=== France vs. Belgium ===
France
4
Sporthallen Zuid, Court 7
16 February 2012, 10:15 UTC+2

Belgium
1

			1	2	3
1	(France) (Belgium)	Pi Hongyan; Lianne Tan	21; 15	21; 18
2	(France) (Belgium)	Audrey Fontaine / Émilie Lefel; Steffi Annys / Séverine Corvilain	23; 21	24; 22
3	(France) (Belgium)	Perrine Le Buhanic; Sabine Devooght	21; 14	21; 8
4	(France) (Belgium)	Lorraine Baumann / Léa Palermo; Janne Elst / Jelske Snoeck	12; 21	21; 19	23; 25
5	(France) (Belgium)	Delphine Lansac; Flore Vandenhoucke	14; 21	21; 19	21; 9

=== Wales vs. Iceland ===
Wales
3
Sporthallen Zuid, Court 8
16 February 2012, 14:15 UTC+2

Iceland
2

			1	2	3
1	(Wales) (Iceland)	Sarah Thomas; Ragna Ingólfsdóttir	11; 21	20; 22
2	(Wales) (Iceland)	Carissa Turner; Tinna Helgadóttir	21; 12	19; 21	21; 18
3	(Wales) (Iceland)	Vikki Jones; Snjólaug Jóhannsdóttir	21; 14	21; 14
4	(Wales) (Iceland)	Sarah Thomas / Carissa Turner; Tinna Helgadóttir / Ragna Ingólfsdóttir	21; 23	14; 21
5	(Wales) (Iceland)	Bethan Higginson / Vikki Jones; Rakel Jóhannesdóttir / Karitas Ósk Ólafsdóttir	23; 21	21; 17

== Group 8 ==
Pos	Team	Pld	W	L	MF	MA	MD	GF	GA	GD	PF	PA	PD	Pts	Qualification	Ukraine	Czech Republic	Lithuania	Croatia
1	Ukraine	3	3	0	15	0	+15	30	2	+28	666	396	+270	3	Knockout stage	—	5–0	5–0	5–0
2	Czech Republic	3	2	1	8	7	+1	17	14	+3	559	490	+69	2			—	3–2	5–0
3	Lithuania	3	1	2	5	10	−5	12	21	−9	518	629	−111	1				—	3–2
4	Croatia	3	0	3	2	13	−11	5	27	−22	415	643	−228	0					—

Source: BWF

=== Ukraine vs. Croatia ===
Ukraine
5
Sporthallen Zuid, Court 7
14 February 2012, 10:15 UTC+2

Croatia
0

			1	2	3
1	(Ukraine) (Croatia)	Larisa Griga; Dorotea Sutara	21; 8	21; 12
2	(Ukraine) (Croatia)	Marija Ulitina; Katarina Galenić	21; 10	21; 5
3	(Ukraine) (Croatia)	Natalya Voytsekh; Maja Pavlinić	21; 11	21; 9
4	(Ukraine) (Croatia)	Natalya Voytsekh / Marija Ulitina; Katarina Galenić / Lucija Vlah	21; 11	21; 8
5	(Ukraine) (Croatia)	Yuliya Kazarinova / Anna Kobceva; Maja Pavlinić / Dorotea Sutara	21; 14	21; 13

=== Lithuania vs. Czech Republic ===
Lithuania
2
Sporthallen Zuid, Court 8
14 February 2012, 14:15 UTC+2

Czech Republic
3

			1	2	3
1	(Lithuania) (Czech Republic)	Akvilė Stapušaitytė; Kristina Gavnholt	21; 19	21; 17
2	(Lithuania) (Czech Republic)	Gerda Voitechovskaja; Zuzana Pavelková	17; 21	14; 21
3	(Lithuania) (Czech Republic)	Rasa Šulnienė; Lucie Černá	7; 21	9; 21
4	(Lithuania) (Czech Republic)	Akvilė Stapušaitytė / Gerda Voitechovskaja; Alžběta Bášová / Kristina Gavnholt	24; 22	21; 14
5	(Lithuania) (Czech Republic)	Indrė Starevičiūtė / Rasa Šulnienė; Lucie Černá / Lucie Havlová	7; 21	10; 21

=== Croatia vs. Czech Republic ===
Croatia
0
Sporthallen Zuid, Court 5
15 February 2012, 10:00 UTC+2

Czech Republic
5

			1	2	3
1	(Croatia) (Czech Republic)	Dorotea Sutara; Kristina Gavnholt	12; 21	7; 21
2	(Croatia) (Czech Republic)	Katarina Galenić; Zuzana Pavelková	8; 21	10; 21
3	(Croatia) (Czech Republic)	Maja Pavlinić; Lucie Černá	11; 21	15; 21
4	(Croatia) (Czech Republic)	Katarina Galenić / Lucija Vlah; Alžběta Bášová / Lucie Havlová	12; 21	14; 21
5	(Croatia) (Czech Republic)	Maja Pavlinić / Dorotea Sutara; Lucie Černá / Kristina Gavnholt	11; 21	8; 21

=== Ukraine vs. Lithuania ===
Ukraine
5
Sporthallen Zuid, Court 8
15 February 2010, 10:15 UTC+2

Lithuania
0

			1	2	3
1	(Ukraine) (Lithuania)	Larisa Griga; Akvilė Stapušaitytė	21; 9	15; 21	21; 19
2	(Ukraine) (Lithuania)	Marija Ulitina; Gerda Voitechovskaja	21; 14	21; 10
3	(Ukraine) (Lithuania)	Natalya Voytsekh; Rasa Šulnienė	21; 5	21; 9
4	(Ukraine) (Lithuania)	Marija Ulitina / Natalya Voytsekh; Akvilė Stapušaitytė / Gerda Voitechovskaja	21; 17	21; 15
5	(Ukraine) (Lithuania)	Yuliya Kazarinova / Anna Kobceva; Indrė Starevičiūtė / Rasa Šulnienė	21; 14	21; 11

=== Ukraine vs. Czech Republic ===
Ukraine
5
Sporthallen Zuid, Court 1
16 February 2012, 10:00 UTC+2

Czech Republic
0

			1	2	3
1	(Ukraine) (Czech Republic)	Larisa Griga; Kristina Gavnholt	21; 15	24; 22
2	(Ukraine) (Czech Republic)	Marija Ulitina; Zuzana Pavelková	21; 14	21; 12
3	(Ukraine) (Czech Republic)	Natalya Voytsekh; Lucie Černá	21; 9	21; 11
4	(Ukraine) (Czech Republic)	Maria Ulitina / Natalya Voytsekh; Kristina Gavnholt / Lucie Havlová	18; 21	21; 11	21; 11
5	(Ukraine) (Czech Republic)	Larisa Griga / Anna Kobceva; Alžběta Bášová / Lucie Černá	21; 15	21; 10

=== Croatia vs. Lithuania ===
Croatia
2
Sporthallen Zuid, Court 4
16 February 2012, 18:00 UTC+2

Lithuania
3

			1	2	3
1	(Croatia) (Lithuania)	Dorotea Sutara; Akvilė Stapušaitytė	15; 21	7; 21
2	(Croatia) (Lithuania)	Katarina Galenić; Gerda Voitechovskaja	10; 21	21; 14	14; 21
3	(Croatia) (Lithuania)	Maja Pavlinić; Rasa Šulnienė	19; 21	21; 14	21; 17
4	(Croatia) (Lithuania)	Katarina Galenić / Lucija Vlah; Akvilė Stapušaitytė / Gerda Voitechovskaja	25; 27	11; 21
5	(Croatia) (Lithuania)	Maja Pavlinić / Dorotea Sutara; Indrė Starevičiūtė / Rasa Šulnienė	21; 8	21; 12
