= 2012 European Women's Team Badminton Championships knockout stage =

This article lists the full results for knockout stage of 2012 European Women's Team Badminton Championships.

== Bracket ==
Quarter-finals
17 February 2012
Denmark	3
Ukraine	2
Russia	3
Bulgaria	1
Switzerland	2
Netherlands	3
France	0
Germany	3

Semi-finals
18 February 2012
Denmark	3
Russia	0
Netherlands	1
Germany	3

Final
19 February 2012
Denmark	1
Germany	3
Third place
19 February 2012
Russia	1
Netherlands	3

== Quarter-finals ==
=== Denmark vs. Ukraine ===
Denmark
3
Sporthallen Zuid, Court 4
17 February 2012, 19:00 UTC+2

Ukraine
2

			1	2	3
1	(Denmark) (Ukraine)	Karina Jørgensen; Larisa Griga	13; 21	18; 21
2	(Denmark) (Ukraine)	Camilla Sørensen; Marija Ulitina	21; 16	21; 19
3	(Denmark) (Ukraine)	Line Kjærsfeldt; Natalya Voytsekh	18; 21	19; 21
4	(Denmark) (Ukraine)	Line Damkjær Kruse / Marie Røpke; Larisa Griga / Anna Kobceva	21; 15	21; 8
5	(Denmark) (Ukraine)	Kamilla Rytter Juhl / Christinna Pedersen; Marija Ulitina / Natalya Voytsekh	21; 9	21; 11

=== Russia vs. Bulgaria ===
Russia
3
Sporthallen Zuid, Court 2
17 February 2012, 19:00 UTC+2

Bulgaria
1

			1	2	3
1	(Russia) (Bulgaria)	Anastasia Prokopenko; Petya Nedelcheva	17; 21	21; 23
2	(Russia) (Bulgaria)	Anastasia Chervyakova / Nina Vislova; Dimitria Popstoikova / Gabriela Stoeva	21; 11	18; 21	21; 9
3	(Russia) (Bulgaria)	Tatjana Bibik; Linda Zetchiri	19; 21	21; 16	21; 12
4	(Russia) (Bulgaria)	Anastasia Prokopenko / Valeria Sorokina; Diana Dimova / Petya Nedelcheva	21; 17	21; 16
5	(Russia) (Bulgaria)	Romina Gabdullina; Stefani Stoeva				not played

=== Switzerland vs. Netherlands ===
Switzerland
2
Sporthallen Zuid, Court 3
17 February 2012, 19:00 UTC+2

Netherlands
3

			1	2	3
1	(Switzerland) (Netherlands)	Jeanine Cicognini; Judith Meulendijks	19; 21	15; 21
2	(Switzerland) (Netherlands)	Sabrina Jaquet; Patty Stolzenbach	21; 10	21; 9
3	(Switzerland) (Netherlands)	Nicole Schaller; Soraya de Visch Eijbergen	21; 12	21; 14
4	(Switzerland) (Netherlands)	Jeanine Cicognini / Sabrina Jaquet; Selena Piek / Iris Tabeling	23; 25	21; 16	20; 22
5	(Switzerland) (Netherlands)	Marion Gruber / Nicole Schaller; Lotte Jonathans / Paulien van Dooremalen	11; 21	12; 21

=== France vs. Germany ===
France
0
Sporthallen Zuid, Court 1
17 February 2012, 19:00 UTC+2

Germany
3

			1	2	3
1	(France) (Germany)	Pi Hongyan; Juliane Schenk	14; 21	15; 21
2	(France) (Germany)	Audrey Fontaine / Émilie Lefel; Sandra Marinello / Birgit Michels	9; 21	10; 21
3	(France) (Germany)	Perrine Le Buhanic; Birgit Michels	8; 21	17; 21
4	(France) (Germany)	Lorraine Baumann / Léa Palermo; Johanna Goliszewski / Carla Nelte				not played
5	(France) (Germany)	Delphine Lansac; Karin Schnaase				not played

== Semi-finals ==
=== Denmark vs. Russia ===
Denmark
3
Sporthallen Zuid, Court 2
18 February 2012, 18:00 UTC+2

Russia
0

			1	2	3
1	(Denmark) (Russia)	Tine Baun; Anastasia Prokopenko	21; 9	21; 12
2	(Denmark) (Russia)	Kamilla Rytter Juhl / Christinna Pedersen; Anastasia Chervyakova / Nina Vislova	21; 15	21; 16
3	(Denmark) (Russia)	Karina Jørgensen; Tatjana Bibik	24; 22	16; 21	21; 16
4	(Denmark) (Russia)	Line Damkjær Kruse / Marie Røpke; Anastasia Prokopenko / Valeria Sorokina				not played
5	(Denmark) (Russia)	Camilla Sørensen; Romina Gabdullina				not played

=== Netherlands vs. Germany ===
Netherlands
1
Sporthallen Zuid, Court 1
18 February 2012, 18:00 UTC+2

Germany
3

			1	2	3
1	(Netherlands) (Germany)	Judith Meulendijks; Juliane Schenk	21; 17	21; 19
2	(Netherlands) (Germany)	Lotte Jonathans / Paulien van Dooremalen; Sandra Marinello / Birgit Michels	19; 21	18; 21
3	(Netherlands) (Germany)	Patty Stolzenbach; Olga Konon	14; 21	6; 21
4	(Netherlands) (Germany)	Selena Piek / Ilse Vaessen; Johanna Goliszewski / Juliane Schenk	17; 21	13; 21
5	(Netherlands) (Germany)	Soraya de Visch Eijbergen; Karin Schnaase				not played

== Third place play-off ==
=== Russia vs. Netherlands ===
Russia
1
Sporthallen Zuid, Court 2
19 February 2012, 14:00 UTC+2

Netherlands
3

			1	2	3
1	(Russia) (Netherlands)	Anastasia Prokopenko; Judith Meulendijks	14; 21	12; 21
2	(Russia) (Netherlands)	Valeria Sorokina / Nina Vislova; Lotte Jonathans / Paulien van Dooremalen	21; 16	21; 9
3	(Russia) (Netherlands)	Tatjana Bibik; Patty Stolzenbach	21; 15	16; 21	19; 21
4	(Russia) (Netherlands)	Anastasia Chervyakova / Anastasia Prokopenko; Selena Piek / Judith Meulendijks	12; 21	21; 16	13; 21
5	(Russia) (Netherlands)	Romina Gabdullina; Soraya de Visch Eijbergen				not played

== Final ==
=== Denmark vs. Germany ===
Denmark
1
Sporthallen Zuid, Court 1
19 February 2012, 15:00 UTC+2

Germany
3

			1	2	3
1	(Denmark) (Germany)	Tine Baun; Juliane Schenk	21; 12	21; 17
2	(Denmark) (Germany)	Karina Jørgensen; Olga Konon	13; 21	10; 21
3	(Denmark) (Germany)	Line Damkjær Kruse / Marie Røpke; Birgit Michels / Juliane Schenk	21; 9	17; 21	16; 21
4	(Denmark) (Germany)	Line Kjærsfeldt; Karin Schnaase	18; 21	21; 23
5	(Denmark) (Germany)	Kamilla Rytter Juhl / Christinna Pedersen; Olga Konon / Sandra Marinello				not played
