= 2012 European Men's Team Badminton Championships knockout stage =

This article lists the full results for knockout stage of 2012 European Men's Team Badminton Championships.

== Bracket ==
Quarter-finals
17 February 2012
Denmark	3
Poland	0
England	3
Ukraine	1
France	1
Russia	3
Netherlands	2
Germany	3

Semi-finals
18 February 2012
Denmark	3
England	0
Russia	1
Germany	3

Final
19 February 2012
Denmark	3
Germany	0
Third place
19 February 2012
England	3
Russia	0

== Quarter-finals ==
=== Denmark vs. Poland ===
Denmark
3
Sporthallen Zuid, Court 4
17 February 2012, 14:00 UTC+2

Poland
0

			1	2	3
1	(Denmark) (Poland)	Jan Ø. Jørgensen; Przemysław Wacha	21; 17	21; 15
2	(Denmark) (Poland)	Mads Conrad-Petersen / Jonas Rasmussen; Łukasz Moreń / Wojciech Szkudlarczyk	21; 14	21; 14
3	(Denmark) (Poland)	Hans-Kristian Vittinghus; Hubert Pączek	21; 13	21; 8
4	(Denmark) (Poland)	Rasmus Bonde / Anders Kristiansen; Michał Łogosz / Robert Mateusiak				not played
5	(Denmark) (Poland)	Viktor Axelsen; Adrian Dziółko				not played

=== England vs. Ukraine ===
England
3
Sporthallen Zuid, Court 3
17 February 2012, 14:00 UTC+2

Ukraine
1

			1	2	3
1	(England) (Ukraine)	Rajiv Ouseph; Dmytro Zavadsky	21; 15	21; 15
2	(England) (Ukraine)	Carl Baxter; Valeriy Atrashchenkov	23; 21	21; 12
3	(England) (Ukraine)	Ben Beckman; Vladislav Druzchenko	16; 21	21; 19	13; 21
4	(England) (Ukraine)	Chris Adcock / Andrew Ellis; Vitaly Konov / Dmytro Zavadsky	21; 11	21; 15
5	(England) (Ukraine)	Chris Langridge / Nathan Robertson; Valeriy Atrashchenkov / Vladislav Druzchenko				not played

=== France vs. Russia ===
France
1
Sporthallen Zuid, Court 2
17 February 2012, 14:00 UTC+2

Russia
3

			1	2	3
1	(France) (Russia)	Brice Leverdez; Vladimir Ivanov	16; 21	17; 21
2	(France) (Russia)	Baptiste Carême / Sylvain Grosjean; Vitalij Durkin / Aleksandr Nikolaenko	13; 21	16; 21
3	(France) (Russia)	Matthieu Lo Ying Ping; Ivan Sozonov	21; 19	22; 20
4	(France) (Russia)	Ronan Labar / Mathias Quéré; Evgenij Dremin / Sergey Lunev	21; 23	22; 20	14; 21
5	(France) (Russia)	Thomas Rouxel; Stanislav Pukhov				not played

=== Netherlands vs. Germany ===
Netherlands
2
Sporthallen Zuid, Court 1
17 February 2012, 14:00 UTC+2

Germany
3

			1	2	3
1	(Netherlands) (Germany)	Eric Pang; Marc Zwiebler	17; 21	21; 19	13; 21
2	(Netherlands) (Germany)	Jorrit de Ruiter / Dave Khodabux; Ingo Kindervater / Johannes Schöttler	16; 21	9; 21
3	(Netherlands) (Germany)	Dicky Palyama; Dieter Domke	21; 17	21; 17
4	(Netherlands) (Germany)	Jacco Arends / Jelle Maas; Michael Fuchs / Oliver Roth	19; 21	21; 13	21; 16
5	(Netherlands) (Germany)	Nick Fransman; Marcel Reuter	15; 21	14; 21

== Semi-finals ==
=== Denmark vs. England ===
Denmark
3
Sporthallen Zuid, Court 2
18 February 2012, 14:00 UTC+2

England
0

			1	2	3
1	(Denmark) (England)	Jan Ø. Jørgensen; Rajiv Ouseph	21; 19			retired
2	(Denmark) (England)	Mathias Boe / Carsten Mogensen; Chris Adcock / Andrew Ellis	21; 13	21; 13
3	(Denmark) (England)	Hans-Kristian Vittinghus; Carl Baxter	13; 21	21; 18	21; 18
4	(Denmark) (England)	Mads Conrad-Petersen / Jonas Rasmussen; Chris Langridge / Nathan Robertson				not played
5	(Denmark) (England)	Viktor Axelsen; Ben Beckman				not played

=== Russia vs. Germany ===
Russia
1
Sporthallen Zuid, Court 1
18 February 2012, 14:00 UTC+2

Germany
3

			1	2	3
1	(Russia) (Germany)	Ivan Sozonov; Marc Zwiebler	12; 21	20; 22
2	(Russia) (Germany)	Vitalij Durkin / Aleksandr Nikolaenko; Michael Fuchs / Oliver Roth	21; 16	21; 16
3	(Russia) (Germany)	Vladimir Malkov; Dieter Domke	7; 21	15; 21
4	(Russia) (Germany)	Vladimir Ivanov / Ivan Sozonov; Ingo Kindervater / Johannes Schöttler	23; 21	15; 21	11; 21
5	(Russia) (Germany)	Stanislav Pukhov; Marcel Reuter				not played

== Third place play-off ==
=== England vs. Russia ===
England
3
Sporthallen Zuid, Court 2
19 February 2012, 09:30 UTC+2

Russia
0

			1	2	3
1	(England) (Russia)	Rajiv Ouseph; Vladimir Ivanov	7; 21	21; 13	21; 19
2	(England) (Russia)	Carl Baxter; Ivan Sozonov	21; 17	21; 19
3	(England) (Russia)	Chris Langridge / Nathan Robertson; Vitalij Durkin / Aleksandr Nikolaenko	19; 21	21; 14	21; 10
4	(England) (Russia)	Ben Beckman; Stanislav Pukhov				not played
5	(England) (Russia)	Chris Adcock / Andrew Ellis; Vladimir Ivanov / Ivan Sozonov				not played

== Final ==
=== Denmark vs. Germany ===
Denmark
3
Sporthallen Zuid, Court 1
19 February 2012, 10:30 UTC+2

Germany
0

			1	2	3
1	(Denmark) (Germany)	Jan Ø. Jørgensen; Marc Zwiebler	21; 11	21; 14
2	(Denmark) (Germany)	Mathias Boe / Carsten Mogensen; Ingo Kindervater / Johannes Schoettler	19; 21	21; 11	21; 18
3	(Denmark) (Germany)	Hans-Kristian Vittinghus; Dieter Domke	21; 19	21; 15
4	(Denmark) (Germany)	Mads Conrad-Petersen / Jonas Rasmussen; Michael Fuchs / Oliver Roth				not played
5	(Denmark) (Germany)	Viktor Axelsen; Marcel Reuter				not played
