= Dorotea Sutara =

Croatian badminton player (born 1996)

Personal information
- Born: 27 March 1996 (age 30) Zagreb, Croatia
- Height: 1.70 m (5 ft 7 in)
- Weight: 58 kg (128 lb)

Sport
- Country: Croatia
- Sport: Badminton
- Coached by: Silvio Jurčić

Women's singles & doubles
- Highest ranking: 118 (WS 3 September 2015); 178 (WD 16 January 2014(
- BWF profile

Dorotea Sutara (born 27 March 1996) is a Croatian badminton player. Sutara began playing badminton at age six, joining her older brother at a badminton club in Zagreb. She liked it, so she started to train regularly. In 2007, she began to compete in international tournaments, when she was coached by badminton coach Karol Hawel from Poland. For a number of years her badminton coach was Ivan Puzjak from Croatia with whom she won several junior tournaments in Europe in women's singles and women's doubles as well as the Badminton Europe Junior Circuit in women's doubles 2012/2013. The 2015 European Games will be the biggest tournament Sutara has competed in to date.

== Achievements ==
=== BWF International Challenge/Series ===
Women's singles
Year	Tournament	Opponent	Score	Result
2014	Hatzor International	(Portugal) Telma Santos	6–11, 6–11, 5–11	(silver) Runner-up

Women's doubles
Year	Tournament	Partner	Opponent	Score	Result
2013	Hatzor International	(Croatia) Maja Pavlinić	(Russia) Olga Golovanova (Russia) Viktoriia Vorobeva	19–21, 7–21	(silver) Runner-up

BWF International Challenge tournament
BWF International Series tournament
BWF Future Series tournament
