= Marcel Reuter =

German badminton player (born 1982)

Personal information
- Born: 25 March 1982 (age 44) Neunkirchen, Germany

Sport
- Country: Germany
- Sport: Badminton

Men's Singles
- Highest ranking: 66 (22 Sep 2011)
- BWF profile
Medal record
Badminton
Representing Germany
European Mixed Team Championships
Silver medal – second place	2011 Amsterdam	Mixed team
European Men's Team Championships
Silver medal – second place	2012 Amsterdam	Men's team
Silver medal – second place	2006 Thessalonica	Men's team
Bronze medal – third place	2010 Warsaw	Men's team

Marcel Reuter (born 25 March 1982 in Neunkirchen) is a German professional badminton player. In 2005, Reuter represented University of Saarbrücken became the champion of the European Universities Badminton Championships in men's singles event. In 2012, he won the Banuinvest International tournament in Romania.

== Career highlights ==
=== Tournament wins ===
Banuinvest International 2012

=== Other ===
- 2006 - Van Zundert Veto Dutch Open International: Men's singles (quarter final)
- 2006 - Van Zundert Veto Dutch Open International: Men's doubles (quarter final)
