= Daniel Messersi =

Italian badminton player (born 1992)

Personal information
- Born: 29 December 1992 (age 33)

Sport
- Country: Italy
- Sport: Badminton

Men's singles & doubles
- Highest ranking: 224 (MS 8 December 2011); 167 (MD 18 April 2013)
- BWF profile

Daniel Messersi (born 29 December 1992) is an Italian badminton player.

== Achievements ==
=== BWF International Challenge/Series ===
Men's doubles
Year	Tournament	Partner	Opponent	Score	Result
2011	Uganda International	(Italy) Giovanni Greco	(Uganda) Ivan Mayega (Uganda) Wilson Tukire	21–14, 21–17	(gold) Winner
2013	Uganda International	(Italy) Giovanni Greco	(Egypt) Mahmoud El Sayad (Egypt) Abdelrahman Kashkal	21–18, 21–18	(gold) Winner

BWF International Challenge tournament
BWF International Series tournament
BWF Future Series tournament
