= 2012 European Men's and Women's Team Badminton Championships =

Tournament details
- Dates: 14–19 February 2012
- Venue: Sporthallen Zuid
- Location: Amsterdam, Netherlands

The 2012 European Men's and Women's Team Badminton Championships was held in Amsterdam, the Netherlands, from February 14 to February 19, 2012. This tournament also serves as European qualification for the 2012 Thomas & Uber Cup.

== Medalists ==
Event	Gold	Silver	Bronze
Men's Team	Denmark	Germany	England
Women's Team	Germany	Denmark	Netherlands

== Men's team ==
=== Group stage ===
==== Group 1 ====
Pos	Team	Pld	W	L	MF	MA	MD	GF	GA	GD	PF	PA	PD	Pts	Qualification	Denmark	Sweden	Scotland
1	Denmark	2	2	0	10	0	+10	20	1	+19	437	313	+124	2	Knockout stage	—	5–0	5–0
2	Sweden	2	1	1	4	6	−2	8	14	−6	374	445	−71	1			—	4–1
3	Scotland	2	0	2	1	9	−8	5	18	−13	398	451	−53	0				—

Source: BWF

==== Group 2 ====
Pos	Team	Pld	W	L	MF	MA	MD	GF	GA	GD	PF	PA	PD	Pts	Qualification	Germany	Ireland	Israel
1	Germany	2	2	0	10	0	+10	16	0	+16	336	188	+148	2	Knockout stage	—	5–0	5–0
2	Ireland	2	1	1	4	6	−2	8	9	−1	283	299	−16	1			—	4–1
3	Israel	2	0	2	1	9	−8	3	18	−15	291	423	−132	0				—

Source: BWF

==== Group 3 ====
Pos	Team	Pld	W	L	MF	MA	MD	GF	GA	GD	PF	PA	PD	Pts	Qualification	England	Czech Republic	Switzerland	Slovenia
1	England	3	3	0	15	0	+15	30	3	+27	687	421	+266	3	Knockout stage	—	5–0	5–0	5–0
2	Czech Republic	3	2	1	8	7	+1	19	16	+3	594	635	−41	2			—	3–2	5–0
3	Switzerland	3	1	2	5	10	−5	12	21	−9	550	609	−59	1				—	3–2
4	Slovenia	3	0	3	2	13	−11	5	26	−21	469	635	−166	0					—

Source: BWF

==== Group 4 ====
Pos	Team	Pld	W	L	MF	MA	MD	GF	GA	GD	PF	PA	PD	Pts	Qualification	Russia	Bulgaria	Wales	Portugal
1	Russia	3	3	0	14	1	+13	30	1	+29	651	390	+261	3	Knockout stage	—	5–0	5–0	5–0
2	Bulgaria	3	2	1	11	4	+7	17	14	+3	560	545	+15	2			—	5–0	4–1
3	Wales	3	1	2	3	12	−9	8	22	−14	450	582	−132	1				—	4–1
4	Portugal	3	0	3	2	13	−11	4	22	−18	382	526	−144	0					—

Source: BWF

==== Group 5 ====
Pos	Team	Pld	W	L	MF	MA	MD	GF	GA	GD	PF	PA	PD	Pts	Qualification	Netherlands	Austria	Hungary	Slovakia
1	Netherlands (H)	3	3	0	14	1	+13	28	4	+24	649	419	+230	3	Knockout stage	—	4–1	5–0	5–0
2	Austria	3	2	1	11	4	+7	24	8	+16	602	491	+111	2			—	5–0	5–0
3	Hungary	3	1	2	3	12	−9	7	24	−17	459	604	−145	1				—	3–2
4	Slovakia	3	0	3	2	13	−11	4	27	−23	430	626	−196	0					—

Source: BWF
(H) Host

==== Group 6 ====
Pos	Team	Pld	W	L	MF	MA	MD	GF	GA	GD	PF	PA	PD	Pts	Qualification	Poland	Spain	Belgium	Lithuania
1	Poland	3	3	0	12	3	+9	26	7	+19	669	496	+173	3	Knockout stage	—	3–2	4–1	5–0
2	Spain	3	2	1	11	4	+7	20	11	+9	593	519	+74	2			—	4–1	5–0
3	Belgium	3	1	2	6	9	−3	15	18	−3	582	586	−4	1				—	4–1
4	Lithuania	3	0	3	1	14	−13	2	27	−25	359	602	−243	0					—

Source: BWF

==== Group 7 ====
Pos	Team	Pld	W	L	MF	MA	MD	GF	GA	GD	PF	PA	PD	Pts	Qualification	France	Italy	Croatia	Estonia
1	France	3	3	0	13	2	+11	27	5	+22	645	440	+205	3	Knockout stage	—	4–1	5–0	4–1
2	Italy	3	2	1	7	8	−1	14	18	−4	521	581	−60	2			—	3–2	3–2
3	Croatia	3	1	2	5	10	−5	11	21	−10	513	595	−82	1				—	3–2
4	Estonia	3	0	3	5	10	−5	13	21	−8	560	623	−63	0					—

Source: BWF

==== Group 8 ====
Pos	Team	Pld	W	L	MF	MA	MD	GF	GA	GD	PF	PA	PD	Pts	Qualification	Ukraine	Finland	Iceland	Luxembourg
1	Ukraine	3	3	0	13	2	+11	28	5	+23	660	492	+168	3	Knockout stage	—	4–1	4–1	5–0
2	Finland	3	2	1	10	5	+5	21	12	+9	642	498	+144	2			—	4–1	5–0
3	Iceland	3	1	2	5	10	−5	12	21	−9	547	623	−76	1				—	3–2
4	Luxembourg	3	0	3	2	13	−11	4	27	−23	404	640	−236	0					—

Source: BWF

=== Knockout stage ===
Quarter-finals
17 February 2012
Denmark	3
Poland	0
England	3
Ukraine	1
France	1
Russia	3
Netherlands	2
Germany	3

Semi-finals
18 February 2012
Denmark	3
England	0
Russia	1
Germany	3

Final
19 February 2012
Denmark	3
Germany	0
Third place
19 February 2012
England	3
Russia	0

=== Final ranking ===
Pos	Team	Pld	W	L	Pts	MD	GD	PD	Final result
1st place, gold medalist(s)	Denmark	5	5	0	5	+19	+34	+221	Champions
2nd place, silver medalist(s)	Germany	5	4	1	4	+10	+16	+168	Runners-up
3rd place, bronze medalist(s)	England	6	5	1	5	+17	+32	+296	Third place
4	Russia	6	4	2	4	+10	+25	+233	Fourth place
5	Netherlands (H)	4	3	1	3	+12	+22	+209	Eliminated in quarter-finals
6	France	4	3	1	3	+9	+19	+180	Eliminated in quarter-finals
7	Ukraine	4	3	1	3	+9	+18	+140	Eliminated in quarter-finals
8	Poland	4	3	1	3	+6	+13	+128	Eliminated in quarter-finals
9	Austria	3	2	1	2	+7	+16	+111	Eliminated in group stage
10	Spain	3	2	1	2	+7	+9	+74	Eliminated in group stage
11	Bulgaria	3	2	1	2	+7	+3	+15	Eliminated in group stage
12	Finland	3	2	1	2	+5	+9	+144	Eliminated in group stage
13	Czech Republic	3	2	1	2	+1	+3	−41	Eliminated in group stage
14	Italy	3	2	1	2	−1	−4	−60	Eliminated in group stage
15	Ireland	2	1	1	1	−2	−1	−16	Eliminated in group stage
16	Sweden	2	1	1	1	−2	−6	−71	Eliminated in group stage
17	Belgium	3	1	2	1	−3	−3	−4	Eliminated in group stage
18	Switzerland	3	1	2	1	−5	−9	−59	Eliminated in group stage
19	Iceland	3	1	2	1	−5	−9	−76	Eliminated in group stage
20	Croatia	3	1	2	1	−5	−10	−82	Eliminated in group stage
21	Wales	3	1	2	1	−9	−14	−132	Eliminated in group stage
22	Hungary	3	1	2	1	−9	−17	−145	Eliminated in group stage
23	Estonia	3	0	3	0	−5	−8	−63	Eliminated in group stage
24	Scotland	2	0	2	0	−8	−13	−53	Eliminated in group stage
25	Israel	2	0	2	0	−8	−15	−132	Eliminated in group stage
26	Portugal	3	0	3	0	−11	−18	−144	Eliminated in group stage
27	Slovenia	3	0	3	0	−11	−21	−166	Eliminated in group stage
28	Slovakia	3	0	3	0	−11	−23	−196	Eliminated in group stage
29	Luxembourg	3	0	3	0	−11	−23	−236	Eliminated in group stage
30	Lithuania	3	0	3	0	−13	−25	−243	Eliminated in group stage

== Women's team ==
=== Group stage ===
==== Group 1 ====
Pos	Team	Pld	W	L	MF	MA	MD	GF	GA	GD	PF	PA	PD	Pts	Qualification	Denmark	Spain	Poland
1	Denmark	2	2	0	7	2	+5	16	9	+7	496	408	+88	2	Knockout stage	—	3–2	4–1
2	Spain	2	1	1	4	5	−1	12	12	0	419	447	−28	1			—	3–2
3	Poland	2	0	2	3	7	−4	9	16	−7	430	490	−60	0				—

Source: BWF

==== Group 2 ====
Pos	Team	Pld	W	L	MF	MA	MD	GF	GA	GD	PF	PA	PD	Pts	Qualification	Germany	Belarus	Cyprus
1	Germany	2	2	0	9	1	+8	19	3	+16	445	232	+213	2	Knockout stage	—	4–1	5–0
2	Belarus	2	1	1	4	6	−2	10	13	−3	327	416	−89	1			—	3–2
3	Cyprus	2	0	2	2	8	−6	4	17	−13	282	406	−124	0				—

Source: BWF

==== Group 3 ====
Pos	Team	Pld	W	L	MF	MA	MD	GF	GA	GD	PF	PA	PD	Pts	Qualification	Netherlands	Sweden	Hungary
1	Netherlands (H)	2	2	0	10	0	+10	20	2	+18	456	264	+192	2	Knockout stage	—	5–0	5–0
2	Sweden	2	1	1	3	7	−4	9	14	−5	356	405	−49	1			—	3–2
3	Hungary	2	0	2	2	8	−6	4	17	−13	262	405	−143	0				—

Source: BWF
(H) Host

==== Group 4 ====
Pos	Team	Pld	W	L	MF	MA	MD	GF	GA	GD	PF	PA	PD	Pts	Qualification	Russia	Slovenia	Ireland	Slovakia
1	Russia	3	3	0	14	1	+13	29	2	+27	639	356	+283	3	Knockout stage	—	5–0	4–1	5–0
2	Slovenia	3	2	1	8	7	+1	17	15	+2	528	568	−40	2			—	3–2	5–0
3	Ireland	3	1	2	6	9	−3	14	21	−7	610	620	−10	1				—	3–2
4	Slovakia	3	0	3	2	13	−11	5	27	−22	414	647	−233	0					—

Source: BWF

==== Group 5 ====
Pos	Team	Pld	W	L	MF	MA	MD	GF	GA	GD	PF	PA	PD	Pts	Qualification	Bulgaria	Finland	Estonia	Portugal
1	Bulgaria	3	3	0	15	0	+15	30	0	+30	632	315	+317	3	Knockout stage	—	5–0	5–0	5–0
2	Finland	3	2	1	7	8	−1	16	17	−1	561	561	0	2			—	4–1	3–2
3	Estonia	3	1	2	5	10	−5	10	22	−12	497	622	−125	1				—	4–1
4	Portugal	3	0	3	3	12	−9	7	24	−17	410	602	−192	0					—

Source: BWF

==== Group 6 ====
Pos	Team	Pld	W	L	MF	MA	MD	GF	GA	GD	PF	PA	PD	Pts	Qualification	Switzerland	England	Scotland	Italy
1	Switzerland	3	3	0	10	5	+5	20	10	+10	558	445	+113	3	Knockout stage	—	3–2	3–2	4–1
2	England	3	2	1	9	6	+3	18	13	+5	558	490	+68	2			—	3–2	4–1
3	Scotland	3	1	2	8	7	+1	19	14	+5	603	520	+83	1				—	4–1
4	Italy	3	0	3	3	12	−9	6	26	−20	365	629	−264	0					—

Source: BWF

==== Group 7 ====
Pos	Team	Pld	W	L	MF	MA	MD	GF	GA	GD	PF	PA	PD	Pts	Qualification	France	Belgium	Wales	Iceland
1	France	3	3	0	12	3	+9	26	8	+18	679	526	+153	3	Knockout stage	—	4–1	4–1	4–1
2	Belgium	3	2	1	8	7	+1	18	17	+1	645	654	−9	2			—	4–1	3–2
3	Wales	3	1	2	5	10	−5	13	23	−10	610	688	−78	1				—	3–2
4	Iceland	3	0	3	5	10	−5	11	20	−9	532	598	−66	0					—

Source: BWF

==== Group 8 ====
Pos	Team	Pld	W	L	MF	MA	MD	GF	GA	GD	PF	PA	PD	Pts	Qualification	Ukraine	Czech Republic	Lithuania	Croatia
1	Ukraine	3	3	0	15	0	+15	30	2	+28	666	396	+270	3	Knockout stage	—	5–0	5–0	5–0
2	Czech Republic	3	2	1	8	7	+1	17	14	+3	559	490	+69	2			—	3–2	5–0
3	Lithuania	3	1	2	5	10	−5	12	21	−9	518	629	−111	1				—	3–2
4	Croatia	3	0	3	2	13	−11	5	27	−22	415	643	−228	0					—

Source: BWF

=== Knockout stage ===
Quarter-finals
17 February 2012
Denmark	3
Ukraine	2
Russia	3
Bulgaria	1
Switzerland	2
Netherlands	3
France	0
Germany	3

Semi-finals
18 February 2012
Denmark	3
Russia	0
Netherlands	1
Germany	3

Final
19 February 2012
Denmark	1
Germany	3
Third place
19 February 2012
Russia	1
Netherlands	3

=== Final ranking ===
Pos	Team	Pld	W	L	Pts	MD	GD	PD	Final result
1st place, gold medalist(s)	Germany	5	5	0	5	+15	+29	+307	Champions
2nd place, silver medalist(s)	Denmark	5	4	1	4	+7	+11	+146	Runners-up
3rd place, bronze medalist(s)	Netherlands (H)	5	4	1	4	+11	+17	+158	Third place
4	Russia	6	4	2	4	+10	+22	+271	Fourth place
5	Ukraine	4	3	1	3	+14	+26	+238	Eliminated in quarter-finals
6	Bulgaria	4	3	1	3	+13	+28	+283	Eliminated in quarter-finals
7	France	4	3	1	3	+6	+12	+100	Eliminated in quarter-finals
8	Switzerland	4	3	1	3	+4	+9	+126	Eliminated in quarter-finals
9	England	3	2	1	2	+3	+5	+68	Eliminated in group stage
10	Slovenia	3	2	1	2	+1	+2	−40	Eliminated in group stage
11	Belgium	3	2	1	2	+1	+1	−9	Eliminated in group stage
12	Czech Republic	3	2	1	2	+1	+3	+69	Eliminated in group stage
13	Finland	3	2	1	2	−1	−1	0	Eliminated in group stage
14	Spain	2	1	1	1	−1	0	−28	Eliminated in group stage
15	Belarus	2	1	1	1	−2	−3	−89	Eliminated in group stage
16	Sweden	2	1	1	1	−4	−5	−49	Eliminated in group stage
17	Scotland	3	1	2	1	+1	+5	+83	Eliminated in group stage
18	Ireland	3	1	2	1	−3	−7	−10	Eliminated in group stage
19	Lithuania	3	1	2	1	−5	−9	−111	Eliminated in group stage
20	Wales	3	1	2	1	−5	−10	−78	Eliminated in group stage
21	Estonia	3	1	2	1	−5	−12	−125	Eliminated in group stage
22	Iceland	3	0	3	0	−5	−9	−66	Eliminated in group stage
23	Poland	2	0	2	0	−4	−7	−60	Eliminated in group stage
24	Hungary	2	0	2	0	−6	−13	−143	Eliminated in group stage
25	Cyprus	2	0	2	0	−6	−13	−124	Eliminated in group stage
26	Portugal	3	0	3	0	−9	−17	−192	Eliminated in group stage
27	Italy	3	0	3	0	−9	−20	−264	Eliminated in group stage
28	Croatia	3	0	3	0	−11	−22	−228	Eliminated in group stage
29	Slovakia	3	0	3	0	−11	−22	−233	Eliminated in group stage
