= Nicole Schaller =

Swiss badminton player (born 1993)

Personal information
- Born: Nicole Schaller; 10 May 1993 (age 33)

Sport
- Country: Switzerland
- Sport: Badminton

Women's singles
- Highest ranking: 53 (8 August 2013)
- Current ranking: 53 (8 August 2013)
- BWF profile

Nicole Schaller (born 10 May 1993) is a badminton player from Switzerland. In 2011, she won Welsh International tournament.

Nicole Schaller has worked as a teacher at the orientation school in Düdingen and trained at the Regional Performance Center RLZ Freiburg. In September 2023 she was employed at Swiss Badminton in a 30 percent workload as a U15 national coach. Schaller also helped the Swiss association at the U17s.

== See also ==
- Swiss Open (badminton)
