= Small States of Europe Badminton Championships =

Regional badminton championships

The Small States of Europe Badminton Championships is a regional badminton tournament sanctioned by Badminton Europe to crown the best badminton players and teams between the microstates of Europe.

== History ==
The idea of establishing a badminton tournament for the small states of Europe began in 2017 during the Badminton Europe Congress in Prague. Malta, Cyprus, and Monaco envisioned a team badminton event uniting small European states, as badminton is not part of the Games of the Small States of Europe (GSSE). The tournament was then confirmed and planned to be held biennially starting from 2020 in Larnaca, Cyprus, with Monaco hosting the second edition. However, the tournament was postponed due to the COVID-19 pandemic.

The championships were finally materialised in November 2023 when Malta successfully hosted the inaugural edition of the championships in Cospicua. In the inaugural edition of the championships, only the mixed team event was held.

== Nations participating ==
- Cyprus (from 2023)
- Faroe Islands (from 2023)
- Gibraltar (from 2023)
- Greenland (from 2023)
- Isle of Man (from 2023)
- Iceland (from 2023)
- Liechtenstein (from 2023)
- Malta (from 2023)
- Monaco (from 2024)
- Luxembourg (from 2026)

== Championships ==
Year	Number	Host City	Host country	Events
2023	1	Cospicua	Malta	1
2024	2	Nicosia	Cyprus	1
2026	3	Tórshavn	Faroe Islands	1
2028	4	La Condamine	Monaco	1

== Past winners ==
=== Individual event ===
Year	Men's singles	Women's singles	Men's doubles	Women's doubles	Mixed doubles
2023	Not held				
2024	Not held				
2026	Not held				
2028	TBD				

=== Team event ===
Year	Country	Venue	Champion	Runner-up	Bronze
2023	Malta	Cospicua	Cyprus	Iceland	Malta
2024	Cyprus	Nicosia	Iceland	Greenland	Cyprus
2026	Faroe Islands	Tórshavn	Iceland	Faroe Islands	Luxembourg
2028	TBD				
