= 2023 Small States of Europe Badminton Championships =

Tournament details
- Dates: 3 – 5 November
- Edition: 1
- Nations: 8
- Venue: Cottonera Sports Complex
- Location: Cospicua, Malta

Champions
- Mixed teams: Cyprus

The inaugural edition of the Small States of Europe Badminton Championships was held in Cospicua, Malta, from 3 to 5 November 2023. The tournament was originally planned to be held in Larnaca, Cyprus in 2020 but was later postponed due to the COVID-19 pandemic.

== Medalists ==
Event	Gold	Silver	Bronze
Mixed team	Cyprus; Iakovos Acheriotis; Andreas Ioannou; Nikolas Kokosis; Ioannis Tambourlas; Eleni Christodoulou; Chara Michael; Ioanna Pissi	Iceland; Davíð Bjarni Björnsson; Kristófer Darri Finnsson; Gabriel Ingi Helgason; Daníel Jóhannesson; Sigríður Árnadóttir; Lilja Bu; Arna Karen Jóhannsdóttir; Una Hrund Örvar	Malta; Matthew Abela; Samuel Cassar; Nigel DeGaetano; Matthew Galea; Lauren Azzopardi; Francesca Clark; Elenia Haber

=== Medal table ===
* Host nation (Malta)

Rank	Nation	Gold	Silver	Bronze	Total
1	Cyprus	1	0	0	1
2	Iceland	0	1	0	1
3	Malta*	0	0	1	1
Totals (3 entries)		1	1	1	3

== Tournament ==
The 2023 Small States of Europe Badminton Championships will crown the best national badminton teams between European microstates.

=== Venue ===
This tournament was held at the Cottonera Sports Complex in Cospicua, Malta.

=== Draw ===
The draw was announced on 2 November 2023. The group stage consists of 2 groups, Group A and Group B. A total of eight teams were invited to participate in the tournament, with Liechtenstein making their first ever team event appearance at an international level. Monaco whom were one of the few nations that envisioned this tournament were not invited to participate.

Group A	Group B
Faroe Islands; Gibraltar; Liechtenstein; Malta	Cyprus; Greenland; Isle of Man; Iceland

== Group stage ==
All times are Central European Time (UTC+01:00).

=== Group A ===
Pos	Team	Pld	W	L	MF	MA	MD	GF	GA	GD	PF	PA	PD	Pts	Qualification
1	Faroe Islands	3	3	0	13	2	+11	27	4	+23	623	363	+260	3	Semi-finals
2	Malta (H)	3	2	1	12	3	+9	24	8	+16	618	426	+192	2	Semi-finals
3	Gibraltar	3	1	2	4	11	−7	9	24	−15	442	641	−199	1	5th–6th place
4	Liechtenstein	3	0	3	1	14	−13	4	28	−24	395	648	−253	0	7th–8th place

Source: TS
(H) Host

==== Faroe Islands vs. Liechtenstein ====
Faroe Islands
5
Cottonera Sports Complex, Court 1
3 November 2023, 10:30

Liechtenstein
0

			1	2	3
1	(Faroe Islands) (Liechtenstein)	Christian Berg Petersen; Nicola Stäheli	21; 13	21; 18
2	(Faroe Islands) (Liechtenstein)	Miriam í Grótinum; Carolin Schneider-Frommelt	21; 4	21; 5
3	(Faroe Islands) (Liechtenstein)	Asbjørn Heide Olsen / Magnus Dal-Christiansen; Marco Langenegger / Markus Schnee	21; 15	21; 13
4	(Faroe Islands) (Liechtenstein)	Bjarnhild Justinussen / Sanna Thorkildshøj; Nadia Gartmann / Carolin Schneider-Frommelt	21; 7	21; 4
5	(Faroe Islands) (Liechtenstein)	Magnus Dal-Christiansen / Mia Thorkildshøj; Mirco Lareida / Oh Ying San	21; 10	21; 14

==== Malta vs. Gibraltar ====
Malta
5
Cottonera Sports Complex, Court 2
3 November 2023, 10:30

Gibraltar
0

			1	2	3
1	(Malta) (Gibraltar)	Nigel DeGaetano / Lauren Azzopardi; Kasper Thy Jessen / Alison Jessen	18; 21	21; 17	23; 21
2	(Malta) (Gibraltar)	Samuel Cassar; Sou Chi Ieong	21; 4	21; 5
3	(Malta) (Gibraltar)	Elenia Haber; Chantal De'Ath	21; 9	21; 11
4	(Malta) (Gibraltar)	Matthew Abela / Matthew Galea; Kasper Thy Jessen / Thomas Reidy	21; 5	21; 11
5	(Malta) (Gibraltar)	Francesca Clark / Elenia Haber; Chantal De'Ath / Alison Jessen	21; 14	21; 14

==== Gibraltar vs. Liechtenstein ====
Gibraltar
4
Cottonera Sports Complex, Court 1
3 November 2023, 14:30

Liechtenstein
1

			1	2	3
1	(Gibraltar) (Liechtenstein)	Kasper Thy Jessen / Alison Jessen; Markus Schnee / Oh Ying San	21; 16	21; 14
2	(Gibraltar) (Liechtenstein)	Thomas Reidy; Mirco Lareida	11; 21	13; 21
3	(Gibraltar) (Liechtenstein)	Chantal De'Ath; Nadia Gartmann	21; 9	17; 21	21; 19
4	(Gibraltar) (Liechtenstein)	Kasper Thy Jessen / Thomas Reidy; Marco Langenegger / Nicola Stäheli	19; 21	21; 16	21; 17
5	(Gibraltar) (Liechtenstein)	Chantal De'Ath / Alison Jessen; Nadia Gartmann / Oh Ying San	21; 11	21; 15

==== Malta vs. Faroe Islands ====
Malta
2
Cottonera Sports Complex, Court 2
3 November 2023, 14:30

Faroe Islands
3

			1	2	3
1	(Malta) (Faroe Islands)	Matthew Abela; Christian Berg Petersen	21; 11	21; 14
2	(Malta) (Faroe Islands)	Francesca Clark; Sanna Thorkildshøj	15; 21	17; 21
3	(Malta) (Faroe Islands)	Matthew Abela / Matthew Galea; Asbjørn Heide Olsen / Magnus Dal-Christiansen	21; 16	17; 21	21; 15
4	(Malta) (Faroe Islands)	Lauren Azzopardi / Elenia Haber; Miriam í Grótinum / Bjarnhild Justinussen	9; 21	0; 4		retired
5	(Malta) (Faroe Islands)	Samuel Cassar / Francesca Clark; Magnus Dal-Christiansen / Mia Thorkildshøj	18; 21	18; 21

==== Faroe Islands vs. Gibraltar ====
Faroe Islands
5
Cottonera Sports Complex, Court 1
4 November 2023, 09:30

Gibraltar
0

			1	2	3
1	(Faroe Islands) (Gibraltar)	Christian Berg Petersen; Sou Chi Ieong	21; 10	21; 11
2	(Faroe Islands) (Gibraltar)	Bjarnhild Justinussen; Amber Prescott	21; 3	21; 9
3	(Faroe Islands) (Gibraltar)	Asbjørn Heide Olsen / Magnus Dal-Christiansen; Thomas Reidy / Sou Chi Ieong	21; 11	21; 8
4	(Faroe Islands) (Gibraltar)	Mia Thorkildshøj / Sanna Thorkildshøj; Chantal De'Ath / Amber Prescott	21; 6	21; 8
5	(Faroe Islands) (Gibraltar)	Magnus Dal-Christiansen / Miriam í Grótinum; Kasper Thy Jessen / Alison Jessen	21; 7	21; 9

==== Malta vs. Liechtenstein ====
Malta
5
Cottonera Sports Complex, Court 2
4 November 2023, 09:30

Liechtenstein
0

			1	2	3
1	(Malta) (Liechtenstein)	Lauren Azzopardi; Oh Ying San	21; 5	21; 8
2	(Malta) (Liechtenstein)	Samuel Cassar; Marco Langenegger	21; 12	21; 10
3	(Malta) (Liechtenstein)	Lauren Azzopardi / Francesca Clark; Nadia Gartmann / Carolin Schneider-Frommelt	21; 6	21; 6
4	(Malta) (Liechtenstein)	Matthew Abela / Nigel DeGaetano; Mirco Lareida / Nicola Stäheli	21; 9	21; 18
5	(Malta) (Liechtenstein)	Samuel Cassar / Francesca Clark; Markus Schnee / Nadia Gartmann	21; 8	21; 9

=== Group B ===
Pos	Team	Pld	W	L	MF	MA	MD	GF	GA	GD	PF	PA	PD	Pts	Qualification
1	Cyprus	3	3	0	12	3	+9	25	7	+18	624	501	+123	3	Semi-finals
2	Iceland	3	2	1	10	5	+5	22	12	+10	651	548	+103	2	Semi-finals
3	Isle of Man	3	1	2	5	10	−5	11	22	−11	529	622	−93	1	5th–6th place
4	Greenland	3	0	3	3	12	−9	9	26	−17	547	680	−133	0	7th–8th place

Source: TS

==== Iceland vs. Greenland ====
Iceland
4
Cottonera Sports Complex, Court 3
3 November 2023, 10:30

Greenland
1

			1	2	3
1	(Iceland) (Greenland)	Kristófer Darri Finnsson / Una Hrund Örvar; Maluk Tiger / Emile Sørensen	19; 21	21; 15	21; 13
2	(Iceland) (Greenland)	Gabriel Ingi Helgason; Julian King	23; 21	21; 17
3	(Iceland) (Greenland)	Lilja Bu; Sara Lindskov Jacobsen	21; 17	17; 21	12; 21
4	(Iceland) (Greenland)	Davíð Bjarni Björnsson / Kristófer Darri Finnsson; Toke Ketwa-Driefer / Maluk Tiger	21; 11	21; 15
5	(Iceland) (Greenland)	Sigríður Árnadóttir / Arna Karen Jóhannsdóttir; Cecilia Josenius / Emile Sørensen	21; 8	21; 8

==== Cyprus vs. Isle of Man ====
Cyprus
5
Cottonera Sports Complex, Court 4
3 November 2023, 10:30

Isle of Man
0

			1	2	3
1	(Cyprus) (Isle of Man)	Nikolas Kokosis; Tobey Cheng	21; 13	21; 19
2	(Cyprus) (Isle of Man)	Eleni Christodoulou; Jessica Li	21; 10	21; 8
3	(Cyprus) (Isle of Man)	Andreas Ioannou / Ioannis Tambourlas; Benjamin Li / Matthew Nicholson	21; 16	21; 15
4	(Cyprus) (Isle of Man)	Chara Michael / Ioanna Pissi; Mia Kirk / Jessica Li	23; 21	21; 11
5	(Cyprus) (Isle of Man)	Iakovos Acheriotis / Eleni Christodoulou; Benjamin Li / Kimberly Clague	21; 14	21; 13

==== Greenland vs. Isle of Man ====
Greenland
1
Cottonera Sports Complex, Court 3
3 November 2023, 14:30

Isle of Man
4

			1	2	3
1	(Greenland) (Isle of Man)	Maluk Tiger / Emile Sørensen; Benjamin Li / Jessica Li	10; 21	21; 17	16; 21
2	(Greenland) (Isle of Man)	Julian King; Tobey Cheng	14; 21	12; 21
3	(Greenland) (Isle of Man)	Sara Lindskov Jacobsen; Mia Kirk	21; 9	21; 12
4	(Greenland) (Isle of Man)	Toke Ketwa-Driefer / Maluk Tiger; Tobey Cheng / Matthew Nicholson	13; 21	14; 21
5	(Greenland) (Isle of Man)	Cecilia Josenius / Emile Sørensen; Kimberly Clague / Jessica Li	10; 11	14; 15

==== Iceland vs. Cyprus ====
Iceland
2
Cottonera Sports Complex, Court 4
3 November 2023, 14:30

Cyprus
3

			1	2	3
1	(Iceland) (Cyprus)	Davíð Bjarni Björnsson / Arna Karen Jóhannsdóttir; Ioannis Tambourlas / Ioanna Pissi	21; 14	21; 12
2	(Iceland) (Cyprus)	Daníel Jóhannesson; Iakovos Acheriotis	18; 11	17; 14
3	(Iceland) (Cyprus)	Lilja Bu; Eleni Christodoulou	9; 21	12; 21
4	(Iceland) (Cyprus)	Davíð Bjarni Björnsson / Kristófer Darri Finnsson; Iakovos Acheriotis / Ioannis Tambourlas	21; 9	21; 16
5	(Iceland) (Cyprus)	Sigríður Árnadóttir / Arna Karen Jóhannsdóttir; Eleni Christodoulou / Ioanna Pissi	17; 21	11; 21

==== Cyprus vs. Greenland ====
Cyprus
4
Cottonera Sports Complex, Court 3
4 November 2023, 09:30

Greenland
1

			1	2	3
1	(Cyprus) (Greenland)	Iakovos Acheriotis / Ioanna Pissi; Maluk Tiger / Emile Sørensen	21; 19	21; 15
2	(Cyprus) (Greenland)	Nikolas Kokosis; Toke Ketwa-Driefer	21; 12	21; 18
3	(Cyprus) (Greenland)	Chara Michael; Sara Lindskov Jacobsen	15; 21	21; 16	13; 21
4	(Cyprus) (Greenland)	Andreas Ioannou / Ioannis Tambourlas; Julian King / Maluk Tiger	21; 17	18; 21	21; 18
5	(Cyprus) (Greenland)	Eleni Christodoulou / Ioanna Pissi; Cecilia Josenius / Emile Sørensen	21; 7	21; 8

==== Iceland vs. Isle of Man ====
Iceland
4
Cottonera Sports Complex, Court 4
4 November 2023, 09:30

Isle of Man
1

			1	2	3
1	(Iceland) (Isle of Man)	Davíð Bjarni Björnsson / Arna Karen Jóhannsdóttir; Matthew Nicholson / Mia Kirk	19; 21	21; 12	21; 18
2	(Iceland) (Isle of Man)	Daníel Jóhannesson; Tobey Cheng	21; 9	21; 18
3	(Iceland) (Isle of Man)	Lilja Bu; Jessica Li	21; 8	18; 21	18; 21
4	(Iceland) (Isle of Man)	Davíð Bjarni Björnsson / Kristófer Darri Finnsson; Tobey Cheng / Benjamin Li	21; 8	21; 11
5	(Iceland) (Isle of Man)	Sigríður Árnadóttir / Arna Karen Jóhannsdóttir; Kimberly Clague / Jessica Li	17; 17	11; 19

== Classification round ==
=== 5th–6th place ===
Isle of Man
3
Cottonera Sports Complex, Court 4
4 November 2023, 14:30

Gibraltar
0

			1	2	3
1	(Isle of Man) (Gibraltar)	Matthew Nicholson / Mia Kirk; Kasper Thy Jessen / Alison Jessen	21; 13	21; 12
2	(Isle of Man) (Gibraltar)	Benjamin Li; Thomas Reidy	21; 8	21; 8
3	(Isle of Man) (Gibraltar)	Jessica Li; Amber Prescott	21; 7	21; 8
4	(Isle of Man) (Gibraltar)	Tobey Cheng / Matthew Nicholson; Kasper Thy Jessen / Thomas Reidy				not played
5	(Isle of Man) (Gibraltar)	Kimberly Clague / Mia Kirk; Chantal De'Ath / Alison Jessen				not played

=== 7th–8th place ===
Greenland
3
Cottonera Sports Complex, Court 1
4 November 2023, 14:30

Liechtenstein
0

			1	2	3
1	(Greenland) (Liechtenstein)	Maluk Tiger / Emile Sørensen; Marco Langenegger / Oh Ying San	21; 15	21; 11
2	(Greenland) (Liechtenstein)	Toke Ketwa-Driefer; Markus Schnee	21; 17	21; 11
3	(Greenland) (Liechtenstein)	Emile Sørensen; Carolin Schneider-Frommelt	21; 8	21; 3
4	(Greenland) (Liechtenstein)	Julian King / Maluk Tiger; Mirco Lareida / Nicola Stäheli				not played
5	(Greenland) (Liechtenstein)	Cecilia Josenius / Sara Lindskov Jacobsen; Nadia Gartmann / Oh Ying San				not played

== Knockout stage ==
=== Bracket ===
Semi-finals
4 November 14:30
Faroe Islands	1
Iceland	3
4 November 14:30
Malta	1
Cyprus	3

Final
5 November 10:30
Iceland	2
Cyprus	3
Third place
5 November 10:30
Faroe Islands	1
Malta	3

=== Semi-finals ===
Malta
1
Cottonera Sports Complex, Court 2
4 November 2023, 14:30

Cyprus
3

			1	2	3
1	(Malta) (Cyprus)	Lauren Azzopardi; Chara Michael	6; 21	6; 21
2	(Malta) (Cyprus)	Matthew Abela; Iakovos Acheriotis	24; 22	23; 21
3	(Malta) (Cyprus)	Lauren Azzopardi / Francesca Clark; Eleni Christodoulou / Ioanna Pissi	19; 21	16; 21
4	(Malta) (Cyprus)	Matthew Abela / Matthew Galea; Andreas Ioannou / Ioannis Tambourlas	19; 21	23; 21	13; 21
5	(Malta) (Cyprus)	Samuel Cassar / Francesca Clark; Iakovos Acheriotis / Eleni Christodoulou				not played

Iceland
3
Cottonera Sports Complex, Court 3
4 November 2023, 12:30

Faroe Islands
1

			1	2	3
1	(Iceland) (Faroe Islands)	Davíð Bjarni Björnsson / Arna Karen Jóhannsdóttir; Magnus Dal-Christiansen / Mia Thorkildshøj	21; 18	22; 20
2	(Iceland) (Faroe Islands)	Daníel Jóhannesson; Christian Berg Petersen	21; 14	21; 14
3	(Iceland) (Faroe Islands)	Lilja Bu; Miriam í Grótinum	20; 22	15; 21
4	(Iceland) (Faroe Islands)	Davíð Bjarni Björnsson / Kristófer Darri Finnsson; Magnus Dal-Christiansen / Asbjørn Heide Olsen	21; 15	21; 16
5	(Iceland) (Faroe Islands)	Sigríður Árnadóttir / Arna Karen Jóhannsdóttir; Miriam í Grótinum / Bjarnhild Justinussen				not played

=== Third place play-off ===
Malta
3
Cottonera Sports Complex, Court 2
5 November 2023, 14:30

Faroe Islands
1

			1	2	3
1	(Malta) (Faroe Islands)	Samuel Cassar / Francesca Clark; Magnus Dal-Christiansen / Mia Thorkildshøj	21; 16	21; 17
2	(Malta) (Faroe Islands)	Matthew Abela; Asbjørn Heide Olsen	21; 14	21; 13
3	(Malta) (Faroe Islands)	Francesca Clark; Miriam í Grótinum	10; 21	10; 21
4	(Malta) (Faroe Islands)	Matthew Abela / Matthew Galea; Magnus Dal-Christiansen / Christian Berg Petersen	21; 14	22; 20
5	(Malta) (Faroe Islands)	Lauren Azzopardi / Francesca Clark; Miriam í Grótinum / Sanna Thorkildshøj				not played

=== Final ===
Iceland
2
Cottonera Sports Complex, Court 3
5 November 2023, 14:30

Cyprus
3

			1	2	3
1	(Iceland) (Cyprus)	Davíð Bjarni Björnsson / Una Hrund Örvar; Ioannis Tambourlas / Ioanna Pissi	21; 19	14; 21	18; 21
2	(Iceland) (Cyprus)	Daníel Jóhannesson; Iakovos Acheriotis	21; 14	21; 13
3	(Iceland) (Cyprus)	Lilja Bu; Eleni Christodoulou	8; 21	9; 21
4	(Iceland) (Cyprus)	Davíð Bjarni Björnsson / Kristófer Darri Finnsson; Andreas Ioannou / Ioannis Tambourlas	21; 9	21; 12
5	(Iceland) (Cyprus)	Sigríður Árnadóttir / Una Hrund Örvar; Eleni Christodoulou / Ioanna Pissi	7; 21	11; 21

=== Final ranking ===
Pos	Team	Pld	W	L	Pts	MD	GD	PD	Final result
1st place, gold medalist(s)	Cyprus	5	5	0	5	+12	+22	+185	Champions
2nd place, silver medalist(s)	Iceland	5	4	1	4	+6	+12	+104	Runners-up
3rd place, bronze medalist(s)	Malta (H)	5	3	2	3	+9	+17	+179	Third place
4	Faroe Islands	5	2	3	2	+7	+15	+210	Fourth place
Eliminated in the group stage
5	Isle of Man	4	2	2	2	−2	−5	−23	5th place
6	Gibraltar	4	1	3	1	−10	−21	−269	6th place
7	Greenland	4	1	3	1	−6	−11	−72	7th place
8	Liechtenstein	4	0	4	0	−16	−30	−314	8th place
