= 2026 Small States of Europe Badminton Championships =

Tournament details
- Dates: 30 October – 1 November
- Edition: 3
- Nations: 9
- Venue: Høllin á Hálsi
- Location: Tórshavn, Faroe Islands

Champions
- Mixed teams: Iceland

The third edition of the Small States of Europe Badminton Championships was held in Tórshavn, Faroe Islands, from 30 October to 1 November 2026. Nine national teams competed in the championships.

== Host selection ==
In July 2025, two nations were announced to host the next two editions of the championships, the Faroe Islands in 2026, with Tórshavn being the host city, and Monaco in 2028.

== Medalists ==
Event	Gold	Silver	Bronze
Mixed team	Iceland; Davíð Bjarni Björnsson; Kristófer Darri Finnsson; Einar Óli Guðbjörnsson; Gustav Nilsson; Hrafnhildur Edda Ingvarsdóttir; Iðunn Jakobsdóttir; Arna Karen Jóhannsdóttir; Una Hrund Örvar	Faroe Islands; Rúni Øster; Árant á Mýrini; Christian Berg Petersen; Asbjørn Heide Olsen; Magnus Dal-Christiansen; Jafet Rasmussen; Jónas Djurhuus; Miriam í Grótinum; Sanna Thorkildshøj; Mia Thorkildshøj; Birna Jacobsen; Ranja Joensen; Bjarnhild Justinussen; Oddbjørg Justinussen	Luxembourg; Yannick Feltes; Filip Liska; Jérôme Pauquet; Maximilian Zeimes; Daria Demchykhina; Jill Felten; Zoé Sinico

=== Medal table ===
* Host nation (Faroe Islands)

Rank	Nation	Gold	Silver	Bronze	Total
1	Iceland	1	0	0	1
2	Faroe Islands*	0	1	0	1
3	Luxembourg	0	0	1	1
Totals (3 entries)		1	1	1	3

== Tournament ==
The 2026 Small States of Europe Badminton Championships will crown the best national badminton teams between European microstates.

=== Venue ===
This tournament was held at Høllin á Hálsi in Tórshavn, Faroe Islands.

=== Draw ===
The draw was announced on 30 October 2026. The group stage consists of 3 groups, Group A, Group B and Group C. A total of nine teams were invited to participate in the tournament. Luxembourg made their debut in the tournament following their absence from the last two editions.

Group A	Group B	Group C
Greenland; Liechtenstein; Malta	Cyprus; Luxembourg; Monaco	Faroe Islands; Gibraltar; Iceland

== Group stage ==
All times are Western European Time (UTC+00:00).

=== Group A ===
Pos	Team	Pld	W	L	MF	MA	MD	GF	GA	GD	PF	PA	PD	Pts	Qualification
1	Greenland	2	2	0	9	1	+8	19	5	+14	343	258	+85	2	Semi-finals
2	Malta	2	1	1	6	4	+2	15	9	+6	337	260	+77	1	Quarter-finals
3	Liechtenstein	2	0	2	0	10	−10	0	20	−20	139	301	−162	0	7th–9th place

Source: TS

==== Greenland vs. Liechtenstein ====
Greenland
5
Høllin á Hálsi, Court 1
30 October 2026, 09:30

Liechtenstein
0

			1	2	3
1	(Greenland) (Liechtenstein)	Julian King; Felix Bader	15; 5	15; 3
2	(Greenland) (Liechtenstein)	Sara Lindskov Jacobsen; Nicole Eisler	15; 5	15; 2
3	(Greenland) (Liechtenstein)	Malinnguaq Egede / Maluk Tiger; Sebastian Schwald / Soh Sin Siang	15; 5	16; 14
4	(Greenland) (Liechtenstein)	Cecilia Josenius / Anna King; Andrina Castelberg / Chow Jing You	15; 12	15; 12
5	(Greenland) (Liechtenstein)	Sebastian Bendtsen / Tina Rafaelsen; Mirco Lareida / Fabienne Grischott	15; 8	15; 5

==== Malta vs. Greenland ====
Malta
1
Høllin á Hálsi, Court 1
30 October 2026, 14:30

Greenland
4

			1	2	3
1	(Malta) (Greenland)	Samuel Cassar / Francesca Clark; Maluk Tiger / Tina Rafaelsen	15; 12	15; 17	15; 11
2	(Malta) (Greenland)	Matthew Abela; Toke Ketwa-Driefer	12; 15	15; 8	11; 15
3	(Malta) (Greenland)	Francesca Clark; Sara Lindskov Jacobsen	10; 15	15; 9	13; 15
4	(Malta) (Greenland)	Matthew Abela / Matthew Galea; Toke Ketwa-Driefer / Maluk Tiger	13; 15	6; 15
5	(Malta) (Greenland)	Lauren Azzopardi / Elenia Haber; Sara Lindskov Jacobsen / Tina Rafaelsen	12; 15	15; 9	20; 21

==== Malta vs. Liechtenstein ====
Malta
5
Høllin á Hálsi, Court 3
31 October 2026, 09:30

Liechtenstein
0

			1	2	3
1	(Malta) (Liechtenstein)	Samuel Cassar; Felix Bader	15; 7	15; 5
2	(Malta) (Liechtenstein)	Francesca Clark; Nicole Eisler	15; 9	15; 2
3	(Malta) (Liechtenstein)	Matthew Abela / Matthew Galea; Felix Bader / Soh Sin Siang	15; 8	15; 10
4	(Malta) (Liechtenstein)	Lauren Azzopardi / Elenia Haber; Andrina Castelberg / Chow Jing You	15; 8	15; 4
5	(Malta) (Liechtenstein)	Samuel Cassar / Francesca Clark; Mirco Lareida / Fabienne Grischott	15; 7	15; 8

=== Group B ===
Pos	Team	Pld	W	L	MF	MA	MD	GF	GA	GD	PF	PA	PD	Pts	Qualification
1	Luxembourg	2	2	0	8	2	+6	18	5	+13	334	203	+131	2	Semi-finals
2	Cyprus	2	1	1	4	6	−2	10	14	−4	284	315	−31	1	Quarter-finals
3	Monaco	2	0	2	3	7	−4	7	16	−9	217	317	−100	0	7th–9th place

Source: TS

==== Monaco vs. Cyprus ====
Monaco
2
Høllin á Hálsi, Court 2
30 October 2026, 09:30

Cyprus
3

			1	2	3
1	(Monaco) (Cyprus)	Melanie Potin; Ioanna Antoniou	15; 5	15; 6
2	(Monaco) (Cyprus)	Alexandre Rampelberg; Nikolas Kokosis	12; 15	9; 15
3	(Monaco) (Cyprus)	Elisa Ganachau / Thien Tran; Eleni Charalambous / Ioanna Pissi	10; 15	7; 15
4	(Monaco) (Cyprus)	Clement Facquet / Lilian Tessier; Konstantinos Giannopoulos / Andreas Ioannou	16; 14	10; 15	9; 15
5	(Monaco) (Cyprus)	Antony Ganachau / Melanie Potin; Kyriacos Pissis / Ioanna Pissi	16; 14	7; 15	15; 13

==== Luxembourg vs. Monaco ====
Luxembourg
4
Høllin á Hálsi, Court 2
30 October 2026, 14:30

Monaco
1

			1	2	3
1	(Luxembourg) (Monaco)	Yannick Feltes / Zoé Sinico; Antony Ganachau / Melanie Potin	15; 6	15; 4
2	(Luxembourg) (Monaco)	Jérôme Pauquet; Alexandre Rampelberg	15; 5	15; 6
3	(Luxembourg) (Monaco)	Daria Demchykhina; Melanie Potin	12; 15	15; 12	13; 15
4	(Luxembourg) (Monaco)	Yannick Feltes / Filip Liska; Clement Facquet / Lilian Tessier	15; 2	15; 5
5	(Luxembourg) (Monaco)	Jill Felten / Zoé Sinico; Elisa Ganachau / Thien Tran	15; 1	15; 5

==== Luxembourg vs. Cyprus ====
Luxembourg
5
Høllin á Hálsi, Court 2
31 October 2026, 09:30

Cyprus
0

			1	2	3
1	(Luxembourg) (Cyprus)	Yannick Feltes / Zoé Sinico; Kyriacos Pissis / Ioanna Pissi	16; 14	15; 12
2	(Luxembourg) (Cyprus)	Jérôme Pauquet; Nikolas Kokosis	12; 15	15; 3	15; 6
3	(Luxembourg) (Cyprus)	Daria Demchykhina; Ioanna Antoniou	15; 10	15; 7
4	(Luxembourg) (Cyprus)	Yannick Feltes / Jérôme Pauquet; Andreas Ioannou / Kyriacos Pissis	15; 5	16; 14
5	(Luxembourg) (Cyprus)	Jill Felten / Zoé Sinico; Eleni Charalambous / Ioanna Pissi	15; 10	14; 16	11; 15

=== Group C ===
Pos	Team	Pld	W	L	MF	MA	MD	GF	GA	GD	PF	PA	PD	Pts	Qualification
1	Faroe Islands (H)	2	2	0	8	2	+6	16	5	+11	288	192	+96	2	Quarter-finals
2	Iceland	2	1	1	7	3	+4	15	6	+9	281	191	+90	1	Quarter-finals
3	Gibraltar	2	0	2	0	10	−10	0	20	−20	114	300	−186	0	7th–9th place

Source: TS
(H) Host

==== Gibraltar vs. Faroe Islands ====
Gibraltar
3
Høllin á Hálsi, Court 3
30 October 2026, 09:30

Faroe Islands
2

			1	2	3
1	(Gibraltar) (Faroe Islands)	Kasper Thy Jessen / Alison Jessen; Rúni Øster / Miriam í Grótinum	3; 15	4; 15
2	(Gibraltar) (Faroe Islands)	Joshua Montado; Jafet Rasmussen	10; 15	8; 15
3	(Gibraltar) (Faroe Islands)	Amber Prescott; Ranja Joensen	1; 15	4; 15
4	(Gibraltar) (Faroe Islands)	Kasper Thy Jessen / Sou Chi Ieong; Magnus Dal-Christiansen / Jónas Djurhuus	9; 15	10; 15
5	(Gibraltar) (Faroe Islands)	Alison Jessen / Sevelanne Newsham; Bjarnhild Justinussen / Mia Thorkildshøj	8; 15	4; 15

==== Iceland vs. Gibraltar ====
Iceland
4
Høllin á Hálsi, Court 3
30 October 2026, 14:30

Gibraltar
1

			1	2	3
1	(Iceland) (Gibraltar)	Iðunn Jakobsdóttir; Alison Jessen	15; 6	15; 8
2	(Iceland) (Gibraltar)	Einar Óli Guðbjörnsson; Sou Chi Ieong	15; 5	15; 4
3	(Iceland) (Gibraltar)	Iðunn Jakobsdóttir / Una Hrund Örvar; Sevelanne Newsham / Amber Prescott	15; 3	15; 5
4	(Iceland) (Gibraltar)	Einar Óli Guðbjörnsson / Gustav Nilsson; Ramel Gonzales / Kasper Thy Jessen	15; 9	15; 5
5	(Iceland) (Gibraltar)	Davíð Bjarni Björnsson / Una Hrund Örvar; Joshua Montado / Sevelanne Newsham	15; 2	15; 6

==== Iceland vs. Faroe Islands ====
Iceland
2
Høllin á Hálsi, Court 3
31 October 2026, 09:30

Faroe Islands
3

			1	2	3
1	(Iceland) (Faroe Islands)	Iðunn Jakobsdóttir; Ranja Joensen	13; 15	7; 15
2	(Iceland) (Faroe Islands)	Gustav Nilsson; Rúni Øster	15; 11	15; 10
3	(Iceland) (Faroe Islands)	Hrafnhildur Edda Ingvarsdóttir / Arna Karen Jóhannsdóttir; Miriam í Grótinum / Mia Thorkildshøj	8; 15	10; 15
4	(Iceland) (Faroe Islands)	Davíð Bjarni Björnsson / Einar Óli Guðbjörnsson; Árant á Mýrini / Jónas Djurhuus	15; 7	15; 9
5	(Iceland) (Faroe Islands)	Kristófer Darri Finnsson / Una Hrund Örvar; Rúni Øster / Miriam í Grótinum	15; 11	10; 15	8; 15

== Classification round ==
=== 7th–9th place ===
Pos	Team	Pld	W	L	MF	MA	MD	GF	GA	GD	PF	PA	PD	Pts	Qualification
1	Liechtenstein	2	2	0	8	2	+6	17	8	+9	332	318	+14	2	7th place
2	Monaco	2	1	1	4	6	−2	11	14	−3	327	290	+37	1	8th place
3	Gibraltar	2	0	2	3	7	−4	10	16	−6	306	357	−51	0	9th place

Source: TS

==== Monaco vs. Gibraltar ====
Monaco
3
Høllin á Hálsi, Court 3
31 October 2026, 14:30

Gibraltar
2

			1	2	3
1	(Monaco) (Gibraltar)	Antony Ganachau / Melanie Potin; Kasper Thy Jessen / Alison Jessen	15; 9	10; 15	15; 7
2	(Monaco) (Gibraltar)	Alexandre Rampelberg; Joshua Montado	12; 15	15; 11	15; 10
3	(Monaco) (Gibraltar)	Melanie Potin; Amber Prescott	15; 3	15; 6
4	(Monaco) (Gibraltar)	Clement Facquet / Lilian Tessier; Kasper Thy Jessen / Joshua Montado	12; 15	11; 15
5	(Monaco) (Gibraltar)	Elisa Ganachau / Thien Tran; Alison Jessen / Sevelanne Newsham	9; 15	15; 7	13; 15

==== Liechtenstein vs. Monaco ====
Liechtenstein
4
Høllin á Hálsi, Court 3
31 October 2026, 18:00

Monaco
1

			1	2	3
1	(Liechtenstein) (Monaco)	Mirco Lareida; Alexandre Rampelberg	15; 10	6; 15	15; 13
2	(Liechtenstein) (Monaco)	Nicole Eisler; Melanie Potin	2; 15	3; 15
3	(Liechtenstein) (Monaco)	Felix Bader / Soh Sin Siang; Clement Facquet / Lilian Tessier	16; 14	15; 10
4	(Liechtenstein) (Monaco)	Andrina Castelberg / Chow Jing You; Elisa Ganachau / Thien Tran	20; 18	15; 9
5	(Liechtenstein) (Monaco)	Mirco Lareida / Fabienne Grischott; Anton Ganachau / Melanie Potin	15; 9	10; 15	15; 12

==== Liechtenstein vs. Gibraltar ====
Liechtenstein
4
Høllin á Hálsi, Court 3
1 November 2026, 09:30

Gibraltar
1

			1	2	3
1	(Liechtenstein) (Gibraltar)	Mirco Lareida / Fabienne Grischott; Kasper Thy Jessen / Alison Jessen	15; 12	16; 14
2	(Liechtenstein) (Gibraltar)	Nicole Eisler; Amber Prescott	13; 15	15; 8	7; 15
3	(Liechtenstein) (Gibraltar)	Mirco Lareida; Joshua Montado	15; 10	13; 15	15; 11
4	(Liechtenstein) (Gibraltar)	Andrina Castelberg / Chow Jing You; Alison Jessen / Sevelanne Newsham	15; 9	15; 11
5	(Liechtenstein) (Gibraltar)	Felix Bader / Soh Sin Siang; Kasper Thy Jessen / Joshua Montado	15; 12	13; 15	18; 16

== Knockout stage ==
=== Bracket ===
Quarter-finals
Greenland
Bye
Iceland	3
Cyprus	1
Malta	1
Faroe Islands	3
Bye
Luxembourg

Semi-finals
Greenland	1
Iceland	3
Faroe Islands	3
Luxembourg	2

Final
Iceland	3
Faroe Islands	1
Third place
Greenland	1
Luxembourg	3

=== Quarter-finals ===
==== Iceland vs. Cyprus ====
Iceland
3
Høllin á Hálsi, Court 1
31 October 2026, 14:30

Cyprus
1

			1	2	3
1	(Iceland) (Cyprus)	Kristófer Darri Finnsson / Arna Karen Jóhannsdóttir; Kyriacos Pissis / Ioanna Pissi	15; 5	16; 14
2	(Iceland) (Cyprus)	Gustav Nilsson; Nikolas Kokosis	15; 12	15; 12
3	(Iceland) (Cyprus)	Hrafnhildur Edda Ingvarsdóttir; Ioanna Pissi	13; 15	12; 15
4	(Iceland) (Cyprus)	Davíð Bjarni Björnsson / Kristófer Darri Finnsson; Konstantinos Giannopoulos / Andreas Ioannou	15; 8	15; 8
5	(Iceland) (Cyprus)	Arna Karen Jóhannsdóttir / Una Hrund Örvar; Ioanna Antoniou / Eleni Charalambous				not played

Malta
1
Høllin á Hálsi, Court 2
31 October 2026, 14:30

Faroe Islands
3

			1	2	3
1	(Malta) (Faroe Islands)	Matthew Abela; Jafet Rasmussen	16; 14	15; 12
2	(Malta) (Faroe Islands)	Francesca Clark; Miriam í Grótinum	4; 15	7; 15
3	(Malta) (Faroe Islands)	Matthew Abela / Matthew Galea; Magnus Dal-Christiansen / Rúni Øster	10; 15	11; 15
4	(Malta) (Faroe Islands)	Lauren Azzopardi / Elenia Haber; Mia Thorkildshøj / Sanna Thorkildshøj	8; 15	18; 16	11; 15
5	(Malta) (Faroe Islands)	Samuel Cassar / Francesca Clark; Rúni Øster / Miriam í Grótinum				not played

=== Semi-finals ===
Greenland
1
Høllin á Hálsi, Court 1
31 October 2026, 18:00

Iceland
3

			1	2	3
1	(Greenland) (Iceland)	Maluk Tiger / Tina Rafaelsen; Kristófer Darri Finnsson / Arna Karen Jóhannsdóttir	10; 15	15; 11	8; 15
2	(Greenland) (Iceland)	Toke Ketwa-Driefer; Gustav Nilsson	9; 15	8; 15
3	(Greenland) (Iceland)	Sara Lindskov Jacobsen; Hrafnhildur Edda Ingvarsdóttir	15; 1	15; 7
4	(Greenland) (Iceland)	Toke Ketwa-Driefer / Maluk Tiger; Davíð Bjarni Björnsson / Kristófer Darri Finnsson	8; 15	14; 16
5	(Greenland) (Iceland)	Sara Lindskov Jacobsen / Tina Rafaelsen; Arna Karen Jóhannsdóttir / Una Hrund Örvar				not played

Faroe Islands
3
Høllin á Hálsi, Court 2
31 October 2026, 18:00

Luxembourg
2

			1	2	3
1	(Faroe Islands) (Luxembourg)	Rúni Øster / Miriam í Grótinum; Yannick Feltes / Zoé Sinico	15; 10	15; 13
2	(Faroe Islands) (Luxembourg)	Christian Berg Petersen; Jérôme Pauquet	9; 15	8; 15
3	(Faroe Islands) (Luxembourg)	Miriam í Grótinum; Daria Demchykhina	15; 8	15; 12
4	(Faroe Islands) (Luxembourg)	Magnus Dal-Christiansen / Rúni Øster; Yannick Feltes / Jérôme Pauquet	10; 15	12; 15
5	(Faroe Islands) (Luxembourg)	Mia Thorkildshøj / Sanna Thorkildshøj; Jill Felten / Zoé Sinico	15; 9	15; 12

=== Third place playoff ===
==== Greenland vs. Luxembourg ====
Greenland
1
Høllin á Hálsi, Court 2
1 November 2026, 13:00

Luxembourg
3

			1	2	3
1	(Greenland) (Luxembourg)	Maluk Tiger / Tina Rafaelsen; Yannick Feltes / Zoé Sinico	15; 4	15; 13
2	(Greenland) (Luxembourg)	Julian King; Jérôme Pauquet	8; 15	7; 15
3	(Greenland) (Luxembourg)	Sara Lindskov Jacobsen; Daria Demchykhina	11; 15	10; 15
4	(Greenland) (Luxembourg)	Toke Ketwa-Driefer / Maluk Tiger; Yannick Feltes / Jérôme Pauquet	13; 15	15; 11	13; 15
5	(Greenland) (Luxembourg)	Sara Lindskov Jacobsen / Tina Rafaelsen; Jill Felten / Zoé Sinico				not played

=== Final ===
==== Iceland vs. Faroe Islands ====
Iceland
3
Høllin á Hálsi, Court 1
1 November 2026, 13:00

Faroe Islands
1

			1	2	3
1	(Iceland) (Faroe Islands)	Davíð Bjarni Björnsson / Arna Karen Jóhannsdóttir; Rúni Øster / Miriam í Grótinum	15; 11	12; 15	15; 12
2	(Iceland) (Faroe Islands)	Gustav Nilsson; Jafet Rasmussen	15; 11	15; 10
3	(Iceland) (Faroe Islands)	Hrafnhildur Edda Ingvarsdóttir; Ranja Joensen	4; 15	4; 15
4	(Iceland) (Faroe Islands)	Davíð Bjarni Björnsson / Kristófer Darri Finnsson; Magnus Dal-Christiansen / Rúni Øster	15; 0	15; 5
5	(Iceland) (Faroe Islands)	Arna Karen Jóhannsdóttir / Una Hrund Örvar; Miriam í Grótinum / Mia Thorkildshøj				not played

== Final ranking ==
Pos	Team	Pld	W	L	Pts	MD	GD	PD	Final result
1st place, gold medalist(s)	Iceland	5	4	1	4	+10	+19	+141	Champions
2nd place, silver medalist(s)	Faroe Islands	5	4	1	4	+7	+13	+117	Runners-up
3rd place, bronze medalist(s)	Luxembourg	4	3	1	3	+7	+14	+137	Third place
4	Greenland	4	2	2	2	+4	+8	+66	Fourth place
5	Malta	3	1	2	1	0	+3	+45	Eliminated in the quarter-finals
6	Cyprus	3	1	2	1	−4	−8	−58	Eliminated in the quarter-finals
7	Liechtenstein	4	2	2	2	−4	−11	−148	Eliminated in the group stage
8	Monaco	4	1	3	1	−6	−12	−63	Eliminated in the group stage
9	Gibraltar	4	0	4	0	−14	−26	−237	Eliminated in the group stage
