= 2024 European Men's Team Badminton Championships qualification stage =

The following results are the 2024 European Men's Team Badminton Championships qualification stage.

== Summary ==
The qualification stage was held between 7 and 10 December 2023 in 5 cities across Europe.

| Group | Host city | Qualifiers | Failed to qualify |
|---|---|---|---|
| 1 | (France) Aire-sur-la-Lys; Complexe Sportif Régional | France | Italy; Bulgaria; Slovenia |
| 2 | (Germany) Bad Camberg; Kreissporthalle | Germany | Finland; Estonia; Malta |
| 3 | (England) Milton Keynes; National Badminton Centre | England | Sweden; Switzerland; Iceland |
| 4 | (Netherlands) Arnhem; National Sports Centre Papendal | Netherlands | Spain; Hungary; Latvia |
| 5 | (England) Milton Keynes; National Badminton Centre | Ukraine | Scotland; Slovakia |
| 5 | (England) Milton Keynes; National Badminton Centre | Ukraine | Belgium^{§} Israel; Greenland |
| 6 | (Czech Republic) Prague; BB Arena Štěrboholy | Czech Republic | Austria; Portugal |
| 6 | (Czech Republic) Prague; BB Arena Štěrboholy | Czech Republic | Azerbaijan^{§} Ireland; Norway |

§: Subgroup's winner.

== Group 1 ==
| Pos | Team | Pld | W | L | MF | MA | MD | GF | GA | GD | PF | PA | PD | Pts | Qualification |
|---|---|---|---|---|---|---|---|---|---|---|---|---|---|---|---|
| 1 | France (Q) | 3 | 3 | 0 | 15 | 0 | +15 | 30 | 1 | +29 | 645 | 358 | +287 | 3 | Advance to Final tournament |
| 2 | Italy | 3 | 2 | 1 | 8 | 7 | +1 | 17 | 17 | 0 | 592 | 585 | +7 | 2 | |
| 3 | Bulgaria | 3 | 1 | 2 | 6 | 9 | −3 | 15 | 20 | −5 | 574 | 597 | −23 | 1 | |
| 4 | Slovenia | 3 | 0 | 3 | 1 | 14 | −13 | 4 | 28 | −24 | 391 | 662 | −271 | 0 | |

Source: BWF
(Q) Qualified to the phase indicated

=== France vs. Slovenia ===
France
5
Complexe Sportif Régional, Court 1
8 December 2023, 10:00 UTC+1

Slovenia
0

| | | | 1 | 2 | 3 |
|---|---|---|---|---|---|
| 1 | (France) (Slovenia) | Toma Junior Popov; Miha Ivančič | 21; 9 | 21; 8 |
| 2 | (France) (Slovenia) | Christo Popov; Andraž Krapež | 21; 11 | 22; 20 |
| 3 | (France) (Slovenia) | Lucas Claerbout; Maj Pobošljaj | 21; 7 | 21; 8 |
| 4 | (France) (Slovenia) | Maël Cattoen / Lucas Renoir; Miha Ivančič / Andraž Krapež | 21; 19 | 21; 17 |
| 5 | (France) (Slovenia) | Éloi Adam / Léo Rossi; Gal Bizjak / Maj Pobošljaj | 21; 9 | 21; 11 |

=== Italy vs. Bulgaria ===
Italy
4
Complexe Sportif Régional, Court 2
8 December 2023, 10:00 UTC+1

Bulgaria
1

| | | | 1 | 2 | 3 |
|---|---|---|---|---|---|
| 1 | (Italy) (Bulgaria) | Giovanni Toti; Ivan Rusev | 21; 18 | 19; 21 | 21; 17 |
| 2 | (Italy) (Bulgaria) | Fabio Caponio; Stanimir Terziev | 21; 10 | 21; 8 |
| 3 | (Italy) (Bulgaria) | Enrico Baroni; Peyo Boichinov | 21; 16 | 21; 16 |
| 4 | (Italy) (Bulgaria) | Matteo Massetti / David Salutt; Stiliyan Makarski / Iliyan Stoynov | 16; 21 | 21; 13 | 10; 21 |
| 5 | (Italy) (Bulgaria) | Fabio Caponio / Giovanni Toti; Peyo Boichinov / Ivan Rusev | 23; 21 | 22; 24 | 21; 12 |

=== France vs. Bulgaria ===
France
5
Complexe Sportif Régional, Court 1
9 December 2023, 17:00 UTC+1

Bulgaria
0

| | | | 1 | 2 | 3 |
|---|---|---|---|---|---|
| 1 | (France) (Bulgaria) | Toma Junior Popov; Iliyan Stoynov | 21; 9 | 21; 7 |
| 2 | (France) (Bulgaria) | Christo Popov; Stanimir Terziev | 21; 5 | 21; 10 |
| 3 | (France) (Bulgaria) | Arnaud Merklé; Stilian Makarski | 21; 4 | 21; 13 |
| 4 | (France) (Bulgaria) | Christo Popov / Toma Junior Popov; Ivan Rusev / Iliyan Stoynov | 21; 15 | 14; 21 | 21; 9 |
| 5 | (France) (Bulgaria) | Maël Cattoen / Lucas Renoir; Peyo Boichinov / Stilian Makarski | 21; 16 | 21; 12 |

=== Italy vs. Slovenia ===
Italy
4
Complexe Sportif Régional, Court 2
9 December 2023, 17:00 UTC+1

Slovenia
1

| | | | 1 | 2 | 3 |
|---|---|---|---|---|---|
| 1 | (Italy) (Slovenia) | Giovanni Toti; Miha Ivančič | 21; 11 | 21; 8 |
| 2 | (Italy) (Slovenia) | Fabio Caponio; Andraž Krapež | 21; 14 | 21; 11 |
| 3 | (Italy) (Slovenia) | Enrico Baroni; Gal Bizjak | 21; 7 | 21; 7 |
| 4 | (Italy) (Slovenia) | Matteo Massetti / David Salutt; Gal Bizjak / Maj Pobošljaj | 22; 20 | 15; 21 | 21; 16 |
| 5 | (Italy) (Slovenia) | Enrico Baroni / Fabio Caponio; Miha Ivančič / Andraž Krapež | 17; 21 | 15; 21 |

=== France vs. Italy ===
France
5
Complexe Sportif Régional, Court 1
10 December 2023, 10:00 UTC+1

Italy
0

| | | | 1 | 2 | 3 |
|---|---|---|---|---|---|
| 1 | (France) (Italy) | Toma Junior Popov; Giovanni Toti | 21; 8 | 21; 11 |
| 2 | (France) (Italy) | Christo Popov; Fabio Caponio | 21; 18 | 21; 16 |
| 3 | (France) (Italy) | Arnaud Merklé; Enrico Baroni | 21; 9 | 21; 8 |
| 4 | (France) (Italy) | Christo Popov / Toma Junior Popov; Matteo Massetti / David Salutt | 21; 10 | 21; 10 |
| 5 | (France) (Italy) | Éloi Adam / Léo Rossi; Enrico Baroni / Giovanni Toti | 21; 18 | 21; 10 |

=== Bulgaria vs. Slovenia ===
Bulgaria
5
Complexe Sportif Régional, Court 2
10 December 2023, 10:00 UTC+1

Slovenia
0

| | | | 1 | 2 | 3 |
|---|---|---|---|---|---|---|
| 1 | (Bulgaria) (Slovenia) | Ivan Rusev; Miha Ivančič | 23; 25 | 21; 9 | 22; 20 |
| 2 | (Bulgaria) (Slovenia) | Stanimir Terziev; Andraž Krapež | | | | w/o |
| 3 | (Bulgaria) (Slovenia) | Peyo Boichinov; Maj Pobošljaj | 21; 10 | 22; 20 |
| 4 | (Bulgaria) (Slovenia) | Stilian Makarski / Iliyan Stoynov; Gal Bizjak / Maj Pobošljaj | 21; 13 | 21; 18 |
| 5 | (Bulgaria) (Slovenia) | Peyo Boichinov / Ivan Rusev; Miha Ivančič / Andraž Krapež | | | | w/o |

== Group 2 ==
| Pos | Team | Pld | W | L | MF | MA | MD | GF | GA | GD | PF | PA | PD | Pts | Qualification |
|---|---|---|---|---|---|---|---|---|---|---|---|---|---|---|---|
| 1 | Germany (Q) | 3 | 3 | 0 | 13 | 2 | +11 | 26 | 4 | +22 | 619 | 365 | +254 | 3 | Advance to Final tournament |
| 2 | Finland | 3 | 2 | 1 | 11 | 4 | +7 | 23 | 9 | +14 | 582 | 476 | +106 | 2 | |
| 3 | Estonia | 3 | 1 | 2 | 6 | 9 | −3 | 13 | 19 | −6 | 527 | 550 | −23 | 1 | |
| 4 | Malta | 3 | 0 | 3 | 0 | 15 | −15 | 0 | 30 | −30 | 293 | 630 | −337 | 0 | |

Source: BWF
(Q) Qualified to the phase indicated

=== Germany vs. Estonia ===
Germany
5
Kreissporthalle, Court 1
8 December 2023, 18:30 UTC+1

Estonia
0

| | | | 1 | 2 | 3 |
|---|---|---|---|---|---|
| 1 | (Germany) (Estonia) | Kai Schäfer; Karl Kert | 21; 9 | 21; 11 |
| 2 | (Germany) (Estonia) | Fabian Roth; Tauri Kilk | 21; 18 | 21; 17 |
| 3 | (Germany) (Estonia) | Bjarne Geiss / Jan Colin Völker; Kristjan Kaljurand / Raul Käsner | 21; 15 | 21; 14 |
| 4 | (Germany) (Estonia) | Matthias Kicklitz; Mario Kirisma | 21; 13 | 21; 6 |
| 5 | (Germany) (Estonia) | Malik Bourakkadi / Patrick Volkmann; Karl Kert / Tauri Kilk | 21; 14 | 21; 16 |

=== Finland vs. Malta ===
Finland
5
Kreissporthalle, Court 2
8 December 2023, 18:30 UTC+1

Malta
0

| | | | 1 | 2 | 3 |
|---|---|---|---|---|---|
| 1 | (Finland) (Malta) | Joakim Oldorff; Matthew Abela | 21; 6 | 21; 6 |
| 2 | (Finland) (Malta) | Eliel Melleri; Samuel Cassar | 21; 15 | 21; 11 |
| 3 | (Finland) (Malta) | Niilo Nyqvist; Matthew Galea | 21; 5 | 21; 8 |
| 4 | (Finland) (Malta) | Anton Kaisti / Joakim Oldorff; Samuel Cassar / Nigel DeGaetano | 21; 17 | 21; 11 |
| 5 | (Finland) (Malta) | Eliel Melleri / Niilo Nyqvist; Mark Abela / Samuel Cali | 21; 8 | 21; 6 |

=== Finland vs. Estonia ===
Finland
4
Kreissporthalle, Court 1
9 December 2023, 13:00 UTC+1

Estonia
1

| | | | 1 | 2 | 3 |
|---|---|---|---|---|---|
| 1 | (Finland) (Estonia) | Kalle Koljonen; Karl Kert | 21; 15 | 21; 12 |
| 2 | (Finland) (Estonia) | Joakim Oldorff; Tauri Kilk | 21; 6 | 14; 21 | 21; 7 |
| 3 | (Finland) (Estonia) | Eliel Melleri; Mario Kirisma | 21; 13 | 21; 15 |
| 4 | (Finland) (Estonia) | Anton Kaisti / Joakim Oldorff; Karl Kert / Tauri Kilk | 23; 21 | 21; 17 |
| 5 | (Finland) (Estonia) | Eliel Melleri / Niilo Nyqvist; Kristjan Kaljurand / Raul Käsner | 21; 15 | 17; 21 | 6; 21 |

=== Germany vs. Malta ===
Germany
5
Kreissporthalle, Court 2
9 December 2023, 18:30 UTC+1

Malta
0

| | | | 1 | 2 | 3 |
|---|---|---|---|---|---|
| 1 | (Germany) (Malta) | Fabian Roth; Matthew Abela | 21; 4 | 21; 6 |
| 2 | (Germany) (Malta) | Malik Bourakkadi / Patrick Volkmann; Samuel Cali / Nigel DeGaetano | 21; 16 | 21; 9 |
| 3 | (Germany) (Malta) | Max Weisskirchen; Samuel Cassar | 21; 11 | 21; 16 |
| 4 | (Germany) (Malta) | Jones Ralfy Jansen / Kenneth Neumann; Mark Abela / Matthew Galea | 21; 6 | 21; 7 |
| 5 | (Germany) (Malta) | Matthias Kicklitz; Nigel DeGaetano | 21; 5 | 21; 8 |

=== Malta vs. Estonia ===
Malta
0
Kreissporthalle, Court 1
10 December 2023, 10:00 UTC+1

Estonia
5

| | | | 1 | 2 | 3 |
|---|---|---|---|---|---|
| 1 | (Malta) (Estonia) | Matthew Abela; Karl Kert | 14; 21 | 11; 21 |
| 2 | (Malta) (Estonia) | Samuel Cassar; Tauri Kilk | 13; 21 | 9; 21 |
| 3 | (Malta) (Estonia) | Samuel Cali / Nigel DeGaetano; Kristjan Kaljurand / Raul Käsner | 10; 21 | 15; 21 |
| 4 | (Malta) (Estonia) | Matthew Galea; Mario Kirisma | 12; 21 | 3; 21 |
| 5 | (Malta) (Estonia) | Mark Abela / Samuel Cassar; Karl Kert / Tauri Kilk | 14; 21 | 11; 21 |

=== Germany vs. Finland ===
Germany
3
Kreissporthalle, Court 1
10 December 2023, 15:00 UTC+1

Finland
2

| | | | 1 | 2 | 3 |
|---|---|---|---|---|---|
| 1 | (Germany) (Finland) | Kai Schäfer; Kalle Koljonen | 18; 21 | 20; 22 |
| 2 | (Germany) (Finland) | Fabian Roth; Joakim Oldorff | 17; 21 | 18; 21 |
| 3 | (Germany) (Finland) | Matthias Kicklitz; Anton Kaisti | 21; 9 | 21; 14 |
| 4 | (Germany) (Finland) | Jones Ralfy Jansen / Marvin Seidel; Eliel Melleri / Niilo Nyqvist | 21; 9 | 21; 6 |
| 5 | (Germany) (Finland) | Bjarne Geiss / Jan Colin Völker; Anton Kaisti / Joakim Oldorff | 21; 15 | 21; 6 |

== Group 3 ==
| Pos | Team | Pld | W | L | MF | MA | MD | GF | GA | GD | PF | PA | PD | Pts | Qualification |
|---|---|---|---|---|---|---|---|---|---|---|---|---|---|---|---|
| 1 | England (Q) | 3 | 3 | 0 | 14 | 1 | +13 | 29 | 3 | +26 | 658 | 440 | +218 | 3 | Advance to Final tournament |
| 2 | Sweden | 3 | 2 | 1 | 8 | 7 | +1 | 18 | 16 | +2 | 629 | 590 | +39 | 2 | |
| 3 | Switzerland | 3 | 1 | 2 | 8 | 7 | +1 | 18 | 18 | 0 | 653 | 645 | +8 | 1 | |
| 4 | Iceland | 3 | 0 | 3 | 0 | 15 | −15 | 2 | 30 | −28 | 396 | 661 | −265 | 0 | |

Source: BWF
(Q) Qualified to the phase indicated

=== Sweden vs. Switzerland ===
Sweden
3
National Badminton Centre, Court 1
7 December 2023, 10:00 UTC+1

Switzerland
2

| | | | 1 | 2 | 3 |
|---|---|---|---|---|---|
| 1 | (Sweden) (Switzerland) | Gustav Björkler; Tobias Künzi | 21; 18 | 21; 14 |
| 2 | (Sweden) (Switzerland) | Filip Karlborg; Joel König | 21; 12 | 17; 21 | 21; 14 |
| 3 | (Sweden) (Switzerland) | Jakob Ekman / Joel Hansson; Nicolas Müller / Minh Quang Pham | 21; 16 | 21; 18 |
| 4 | (Sweden) (Switzerland) | Johan Azelius; Julien Scheiwiller | 23; 21 | 16; 21 | 17; 21 |
| 5 | (Sweden) (Switzerland) | Ludwig Axelsson / Filip Karlborg; Tobias Künzi / Yann Orteu | 21; 14 | 20; 22 | 19; 21 |

=== England vs. Iceland ===
England
5
National Badminton Centre, Court 2
7 December 2023, 10:00 UTC+1

Iceland
0

| | | | 1 | 2 | 3 |
|---|---|---|---|---|---|
| 1 | (England) (Iceland) | Harry Huang; Gabriel Ingi Helgason | 21; 7 | 21; 3 |
| 2 | (England) (Iceland) | Nadeem Dalvi; Daniel Johannesson | 21; 10 | 21; 14 |
| 3 | (England) (Iceland) | Cholan Kayan; Gustav Nilsson | 21; 8 | 21; 12 |
| 4 | (England) (Iceland) | Ben Lane / Sean Vendy; David Bjarni Björnsson / Kristófer Darri Finnsson | 21; 11 | 21; 16 |
| 5 | (England) (Iceland) | Callum Hemming / Ethan van Leeuwen; Daniel Johannesson / Gustav Nilsson | 21; 11 | 21; 9 |

=== Sweden vs. Iceland ===
Sweden
5
National Badminton Centre, Court 1
8 December 2023, 10:00 UTC+1

Iceland
0

| | | | 1 | 2 | 3 |
|---|---|---|---|---|---|
| 1 | (Sweden) (Iceland) | Gustav Björkler; Gabriel Ingi Helgason | 21; 7 | 21; 9 |
| 2 | (Sweden) (Iceland) | Romeo Makboul; Daniel Johannesson | 21; 5 | 21; 14 |
| 3 | (Sweden) (Iceland) | Johan Azelius; Gustav Nilsson | 21; 11 | 21; 12 |
| 4 | (Sweden) (Iceland) | Joel Hansson / Filip Karlborg; David Bjarni Björnsson / Kristófer Darri Finnsson | 15; 21 | 21; 16 | 21; 17 |
| 5 | (Sweden) (Iceland) | Jakob Ekman / Oscar Reuterhall; Daniel Johannesson / Gustav Nilsson | 21; 16 | 21; 19 |

=== England vs. Switzerland ===
England
4
National Badminton Centre, Court 2
8 December 2023, 10:00 UTC+1

Switzerland
1

| | | | 1 | 2 | 3 |
|---|---|---|---|---|---|
| 1 | (England) (Switzerland) | Harry Huang; Tobias Künzi | 19; 21 | 21; 9 | 11; 21 |
| 2 | (England) (Switzerland) | Johnnie Torjussen; Julien Scheiwiller | 21; 14 | 19; 21 | 21; 12 |
| 3 | (England) (Switzerland) | Cholan Kayan; Nicolas Müller | 21; 14 | 21; 19 |
| 4 | (England) (Switzerland) | Ben Lane / Sean Vendy; Yann Orteu / Minh Quang Pham | 21; 15 | 21; 19 |
| 5 | (England) (Switzerland) | Rory Easton / Zach Russ; Tobias Künzi / Nicolas Müller | 21; 17 | 21; 12 |

=== Switzerland vs. Iceland ===
Switzerland
5
National Badminton Centre, Court 1
9 December 2023, 10:00 UTC+1

Iceland
0

| | | | 1 | 2 | 3 |
|---|---|---|---|---|---|
| 1 | (Switzerland) (Iceland) | Joel König; Gabriel Ingi Helgason | 21; 14 | 21; 14 |
| 2 | (Switzerland) (Iceland) | Julien Scheiwiller; Daniel Johannesson | 21; 11 | 21; 15 |
| 3 | (Switzerland) (Iceland) | Nicolas Müller; Gustav Nilsson | 21; 10 | 21; 8 |
| 4 | (Switzerland) (Iceland) | Yann Orteu / Minh Quang Pham; David Bjarni Björnsson / Kristófer Darri Finnsson | 21; 17 | 16; 21 | 21; 15 |
| 5 | (Switzerland) (Iceland) | Nicolas Müller / Julien Scheiwiller; Daniel Johannesson / Gustav Nilsson | 21; 8 | 21; 15 |

=== England vs. Sweden ===
England
5
National Badminton Centre, Court 2
9 December 2023, 10:00 UTC+1

Sweden
0

| | | | 1 | 2 | 3 |
|---|---|---|---|---|---|
| 1 | (England) (Sweden) | Harry Huang; Gustav Björkler | 21; 16 | 21; 13 |
| 2 | (England) (Sweden) | Rory Easton / Zach Russ; Joel Hansson / Romeo Makboul | 21; 18 | 21; 9 |
| 3 | (England) (Sweden) | Johnnie Torjussen; Filip Karlborg | 21; 14 | 21; 15 |
| 4 | (England) (Sweden) | Callum Hemming / Ethan van Leeuwen; Ludwig Axelsson / Jakob Ekman | 21; 14 | 21; 15 |
| 5 | (England) (Sweden) | Cholan Kayan; Johan Azelius | 21; 14 | 21; 17 |

== Group 4 ==
| Pos | Team | Pld | W | L | MF | MA | MD | GF | GA | GD | PF | PA | PD | Pts | Qualification |
|---|---|---|---|---|---|---|---|---|---|---|---|---|---|---|---|
| 1 | Netherlands (Q) | 3 | 3 | 0 | 13 | 2 | +11 | 27 | 7 | +20 | 695 | 478 | +217 | 3 | Advance to Final tournament |
| 2 | Spain | 3 | 2 | 1 | 12 | 3 | +9 | 26 | 7 | +19 | 663 | 493 | +170 | 2 | |
| 3 | Hungary | 3 | 1 | 2 | 5 | 10 | −5 | 11 | 20 | −9 | 492 | 570 | −78 | 1 | |
| 4 | Latvia | 3 | 0 | 3 | 0 | 15 | −15 | 0 | 30 | −30 | 321 | 630 | −309 | 0 | |

Source: BWF
(Q) Qualified to the phase indicated

=== Spain vs. Hungary ===
Spain
5
Sportcentrum Papendal, Court 1
7 December 2023, 10:30 UTC+1

Hungary
0

| | | | 1 | 2 | 3 |
|---|---|---|---|---|---|
| 1 | (Spain) (Hungary) | Pablo Abián; Márton Szerecz | 21; 13 | 21; 12 |
| 2 | (Spain) (Hungary) | Rubén García / Carlos Piris; Zsombor Ágai / Miklós Kis-Kasza | 21; 15 | 21; 11 |
| 3 | (Spain) (Hungary) | Luís Enrique Peñalver; Ádám Könczöl | 21; 7 | 21; 10 |
| 4 | (Spain) (Hungary) | Jacobo Fernández / Daniel Franco; Zoltán Kereszti / Márton Szerecz | 21; 12 | 21; 15 |
| 5 | (Spain) (Hungary) | Álvaro Leal; Milán Mesterházy | 21; 13 | 21; 18 |

=== Netherlands vs. Latvia ===
Netherlands
5
Sportcentrum Papendal, Court 1
7 December 2023, 15:30 UTC+1

Latvia
0

| | | | 1 | 2 | 3 |
|---|---|---|---|---|---|
| 1 | (Netherlands) (Latvia) | Mark Caljouw; Reinis Krauklis | 21; 5 | 21; 4 |
| 2 | (Netherlands) (Latvia) | Joran Kweekel; Andis Bērziņs | 21; 3 | 21; 10 |
| 3 | (Netherlands) (Latvia) | Rune van Dalm; Artūrs Ķelpe | 21; 10 | 21; 12 |
| 4 | (Netherlands) (Latvia) | Andy Buijk / Timo Stoffelen; Edžus Meirāns / Rihards Žugs | 21; 5 | 21; 6 |
| 5 | (Netherlands) (Latvia) | Dyon van Wijlick / Brian Wassink; Artūrs Ķelpe / Reinis Krauklis | 21; 15 | 21; 9 |

=== Spain vs. Latvia ===
Spain
5
Sportcentrum Papendal, Court 1
8 December 2023, 10:30 UTC+1

Latvia
0

| | | | 1 | 2 | 3 |
|---|---|---|---|---|---|
| 1 | (Spain) (Latvia) | Pablo Abián; Reinis Krauklis | 21; 15 | 21; 15 |
| 2 | (Spain) (Latvia) | Jacobo Fernández / Daniel Franco; Edžus Meirāns / Rihards Žugs | 21; 8 | 21; 13 |
| 3 | (Spain) (Latvia) | Luís Enrique Peñalver; Andis Bērziņs | 21; 7 | 21; 8 |
| 4 | (Spain) (Latvia) | Rubén García / Carlos Piris; Artūrs Ķelpe / Reinis Krauklis | 21; 12 | 21; 16 |
| 5 | (Spain) (Latvia) | Álvaro Leal; Edžus Meirāns | 21; 12 | 21; 7 |

=== Netherlands vs. Hungary ===
Netherlands
5
Sportcentrum Papendal, Court 1
8 December 2023, 15:30 UTC+1

Hungary
0

| | | | 1 | 2 | 3 |
|---|---|---|---|---|---|
| 1 | (Netherlands) (Hungary) | Mark Caljouw; Márton Szerecz | 21; 13 | 21; 18 |
| 2 | (Netherlands) (Hungary) | Joran Kweekel; Ádám Könczöl | 21; 13 | 21; 13 |
| 3 | (Netherlands) (Hungary) | Finn Achthoven; Milán Mesterházy | 23; 21 | 18; 21 | 21; 11 |
| 4 | (Netherlands) (Hungary) | Ties van der Lecq / Brian Wassink; Zsombor Ágai / Miklós Kis-Kasza | 21; 7 | 21; 7 |
| 5 | (Netherlands) (Hungary) | Andy Buijk / Timo Stoffelen; Zoltán Kereszti / Ádám Könczöl | 21; 12 | 22; 20 |

=== Hungary vs. Latvia ===
Hungary
5
Sportcentrum Papendal, Court 1
9 December 2023, 15:30 UTC+1

Latvia
0

| | | | 1 | 2 | 3 |
|---|---|---|---|---|---|
| 1 | (Hungary) (Latvia) | Márton Szerecz; Reinis Krauklis | 21; 15 | 21; 11 |
| 2 | (Hungary) (Latvia) | Ádám Könczöl; Andis Bērziņs | 21; 9 | 21; 5 |
| 3 | (Hungary) (Latvia) | Milán Mesterházy; Artūrs Ķelpe | 21; 10 | 21; 19 |
| 4 | (Hungary) (Latvia) | Zoltán Kereszti / Márton Szerecz; Edžus Meirāns / Rihards Žugs | 21; 15 | 21; 14 |
| 5 | (Hungary) (Latvia) | Zsombor Ágai / Miklós Kis-Kasza; Artūrs Ķelpe / Reinis Krauklis | 21; 18 | 21; 13 |

=== Netherlands vs. Spain ===
Netherlands
3
Sportcentrum Papendal, Court 2
9 December 2023, 15:30 UTC+1

Spain
2

| | | | 1 | 2 | 3 |
|---|---|---|---|---|---|
| 1 | (Netherlands) (Spain) | Mark Caljouw; Pablo Abián | 21; 18 | 22; 24 | 19; 21 |
| 2 | (Netherlands) (Spain) | Joran Kweekel; Luís Enrique Peñalver | 21; 17 | 19; 21 | 21; 19 |
| 3 | (Netherlands) (Spain) | Ruben Jille / Robin Tabeling; Jacobo Fernández / Carlos Piris | 21; 16 | 21; 10 |
| 4 | (Netherlands) (Spain) | Noah Haase; Álvaro Leal | 13; 21 | 16; 21 |
| 5 | (Netherlands) (Spain) | Ties van der Lecq / Brian Wassink; Rubén García / Luís Enrique Peñalver | 18; 21 | 21; 16 | 21; 18 |

== Group 5 ==
=== Subgroup 5A ===
| Pos | Team | Pld | W | L | MF | MA | MD | GF | GA | GD | PF | PA | PD | Pts | Qualification |
|---|---|---|---|---|---|---|---|---|---|---|---|---|---|---|---|
| 1 | Ukraine (Q) | 2 | 2 | 0 | 7 | 3 | +4 | 15 | 10 | +5 | 457 | 397 | +60 | 2 | Advance to decider |
| 2 | Scotland | 2 | 1 | 1 | 6 | 4 | +2 | 15 | 8 | +7 | 431 | 362 | +69 | 1 | |
| 3 | Slovakia | 2 | 0 | 2 | 2 | 8 | −6 | 6 | 18 | −12 | 329 | 458 | −129 | 0 | |

Source: BWF
(Q) Qualified to the phase indicated

==== Scotland vs. Ukraine ====
Scotland
2
National Badminton Centre, Court 2
7 December 2023, 14:00 UTC+1

Ukraine
3

| | | | 1 | 2 | 3 |
|---|---|---|---|---|---|
| 1 | (Scotland) (Ukraine) | Joshua Apiliga; Danylo Bosniuk | 14; 21 | 18; 21 |
| 2 | (Scotland) (Ukraine) | Callum Smith; Viacheslav Yakovlev | 21; 15 | 20; 22 | 15; 21 |
| 3 | (Scotland) (Ukraine) | Matthew Grimley / Adam Pringle; Glib Beketov / Ivan Druzhchenko | 22; 20 | 21; 8 |
| 4 | (Scotland) (Ukraine) | Matthew Waring; Kyrylo Leonov | 16; 21 | 21; 17 | 9; 21 |
| 5 | (Scotland) (Ukraine) | Alexander Dunn / Adam Hall; Viacheslav Yakovlev / Nikita Yeromenko | 21; 15 | 21; 9 |

==== Slovakia vs. Ukraine ====
Slovakia
1
National Badminton Centre, Court 2
8 December 2023, 14:00 UTC+1

Ukraine
4

| | | | 1 | 2 | 3 |
|---|---|---|---|---|---|
| 1 | (Slovakia) (Ukraine) | Milan Dratva; Danylo Bosniuk | 13; 21 | 21; 12 | 21; 7 |
| 2 | (Slovakia) (Ukraine) | Sebastián Kadlec; Viacheslav Yakovlev | 10; 21 | 3; 21 |
| 3 | (Slovakia) (Ukraine) | Andrej Suchý; Kyrylo Leonov | 8; 21 | 8; 21 |
| 4 | (Slovakia) (Ukraine) | Milan Dratva / Richard Pavlik; Glib Beketov / Ivan Druzhchenko | 13; 21 | 21; 19 | 18; 21 |
| 5 | (Slovakia) (Ukraine) | Andrej Suchý / Simeon Suchý; Viacheslav Yakovlev / Nikita Yeromenko | 21; 19 | 10; 21 | 11; 21 |

==== Scotland vs. Slovakia ====
Scotland
4
National Badminton Centre, Court 2
9 December 2023, 14:00 UTC+1

Slovakia
1

| | | | 1 | 2 | 3 |
|---|---|---|---|---|---|
| 1 | (Scotland) (Slovakia) | Joshua Apiliga; Milan Dratva | 21; 17 | 8; 21 | 15; 21 |
| 2 | (Scotland) (Slovakia) | Callum Smith; Sebastián Kadlec | 21; 15 | 21; 9 |
| 3 | (Scotland) (Slovakia) | Matthew Waring; Richard Pavlik | 21; 12 | 21; 13 |
| 4 | (Scotland) (Slovakia) | Christopher Grimley / Matthew Grimley; Andrej Suchý / Simeon Suchý | 21; 16 | 21; 14 |
| 5 | (Scotland) (Slovakia) | Jack MacGregor / Adam Pringle; Sebastián Kadlec / Richard Pavlik | 21; 4 | 21; 9 |

=== Subgroup 5B ===
| Pos | Team | Pld | W | L | MF | MA | MD | GF | GA | GD | PF | PA | PD | Pts | Qualification |
|---|---|---|---|---|---|---|---|---|---|---|---|---|---|---|---|
| 1 | Belgium (Q) | 2 | 2 | 0 | 9 | 1 | +8 | 18 | 3 | +15 | 427 | 247 | +180 | 2 | Advance to decider |
| 2 | Israel | 2 | 1 | 1 | 5 | 5 | 0 | 12 | 10 | +2 | 355 | 360 | −5 | 1 | |
| 3 | Greenland | 2 | 0 | 2 | 1 | 9 | −8 | 2 | 19 | −17 | 247 | 422 | −175 | 0 | |

Source: BWF
(Q) Qualified to the phase indicated

==== Israel vs. Greenland ====
Israel
4
National Badminton Centre, Court 1
7 December 2023, 14:00 UTC+1

Greenland
1

| | | | 1 | 2 | 3 |
|---|---|---|---|---|---|
| 1 | (Israel) (Greenland) | Misha Zilberman; Jens-Frederik Nielsen | 21; 10 | 21; 5 |
| 2 | (Israel) (Greenland) | Maxim Grinblat; Julian King | 21; 11 | 21; 8 |
| 3 | (Israel) (Greenland) | Amir Shapira; Toke Ketwa-Driefer | 21; 10 | 21; 15 |
| 4 | (Israel) (Greenland) | Maxim Grinblat / Misha Zilberman; Jens-Frederik Nielsen / Maluk Tiger | 21; 18 | 21; 13 |
| 5 | (Israel) (Greenland) | Mark Aronchik / Idan Schneidman; Sebastian Reimer Bendtsen / Toke Ketwa-Driefer | 21; 11 | 9; 21 | 14; 21 |

==== Belgium vs. Greenland ====
Belgium
5
National Badminton Centre, Court 1
8 December 2023, 14:00 UTC+1

Greenland
0

| | | | 1 | 2 | 3 |
|---|---|---|---|---|---|
| 1 | (Belgium) (Greenland) | Julien Carraggi; Jens-Frederik Nielsen | 21; 10 | 21; 10 |
| 2 | (Belgium) (Greenland) | Charles Fouyn; Julian King | 21; 3 | 21; 6 |
| 3 | (Belgium) (Greenland) | Baptiste Rolin; Sebastian Reimer Bendtsen | 21; 8 | 21; 10 |
| 4 | (Belgium) (Greenland) | Elias Bracke / Senne Houthoofd; Jens-Frederik Nielsen / Maluk Tiger | 21; 15 | 21; 14 |
| 5 | (Belgium) (Greenland) | Charles Fouyn / Baptiste Rolin; Sebastian Reimer Bendtsen / Toke Ketwa-Driefer | 21; 14 | 21; 14 |

==== Israel vs. Belgium ====
Israel
1
National Badminton Centre, Court 1
9 December 2023, 14:00 UTC+1

Belgium
4

| | | | 1 | 2 | 3 |
|---|---|---|---|---|---|
| 1 | (Israel) (Belgium) | Maxim Grinblat; Julien Carraggi | 15; 21 | 9; 21 |
| 2 | (Israel) (Belgium) | Idan Schneidman; Elias Bracke | 13; 21 | 5; 21 |
| 3 | (Israel) (Belgium) | Amir Shapira; Charles Fouyn | 9; 21 | 6; 21 |
| 4 | (Israel) (Belgium) | Mark Aronchik / Idan Schneidman; Julien Carraggi / Charles Fouyn | 21; 19 | 10; 21 | 13; 21 |
| 5 | (Israel) (Belgium) | Amir Shapira / Misha Zilberman; Elias Bracke / Senne Houthoofd | 21; 16 | 21; 14 |

=== Decider ===
==== Ukraine vs. Belgium ====
Ukraine
3
National Badminton Centre, Court 2
10 December 2023, 10:00 UTC+1

Belgium
1

| | | | 1 | 2 | 3 |
|---|---|---|---|---|---|---|
| 1 | (Ukraine) (Belgium) | Danylo Bosniuk; Julien Carraggi | 21; 13 | 14; 21 | 21; 12 |
| 2 | (Ukraine) (Belgium) | Viacheslav Yakovlev; Elias Bracke | 12; 21 | 10; 21 |
| 3 | (Ukraine) (Belgium) | Kyrylo Leonov; Charles Fouyn | 24; 22 | 21; 18 |
| 4 | (Ukraine) (Belgium) | Danylo Bosniuk / Viacheslav Yakovlev; Elias Bracke / Senne Houthoofd | 21; 13 | 21; 19 |
| 5 | (Ukraine) (Belgium) | Glib Beketov / Ivan Druzchenko; Julien Carraggi / Charles Fouyn | | | | not played |

== Group 6 ==
=== Subgroup 6A ===
| Pos | Team | Pld | W | L | MF | MA | MD | GF | GA | GD | PF | PA | PD | Pts | Qualification |
|---|---|---|---|---|---|---|---|---|---|---|---|---|---|---|---|
| 1 | Czech Republic (Q) | 2 | 2 | 0 | 9 | 1 | +8 | 18 | 3 | +15 | 425 | 279 | +146 | 2 | Advance to decider |
| 2 | Austria | 2 | 1 | 1 | 6 | 4 | +2 | 13 | 11 | +2 | 441 | 432 | +9 | 1 | |
| 3 | Portugal | 2 | 0 | 2 | 0 | 10 | −10 | 3 | 20 | −17 | 324 | 479 | −155 | 0 | |

Source: BWF
(Q) Qualified to the phase indicated

==== Czech Republic vs. Portugal ====
Czech Republic
5
BB Arena Štěrboholy, Court 1
7 December 2023, 14:00 UTC+1

Portugal
0

| | | | 1 | 2 | 3 |
|---|---|---|---|---|---|---|
| 1 | (Czech Republic) (Portugal) | Jiří Král; Bernardo Atilano | 21; 12 | 21; 15 |
| 2 | (Czech Republic) (Portugal) | Dominik Kopřiva; Bruno Carvalho | 21; 11 | 21; 13 |
| 3 | (Czech Republic) (Portugal) | Adam Mendrek; Diogo Glória | 21; 12 | 21; 10 |
| 4 | (Czech Republic) (Portugal) | Vít Kulíšek / Tomáš Švejda; Florian Alface / Bruno Carvalho | 21; 16 | 21; 18 |
| 5 | (Czech Republic) (Portugal) | Ondřej Král / Adam Mendrek; Diogo Gloria / Gabriel Rodrigues | | | | w/o |

==== Austria vs. Portugal ====
Austria
5
BB Arena Štěrboholy, Court 1
8 December 2023, 14:00 UTC+1

Portugal
0

| | | | 1 | 2 | 3 |
|---|---|---|---|---|---|
| 1 | (Austria) (Portugal) | Luka Wraber; Bernardo Atilano | 21; 15 | 23; 25 | 21; 8 |
| 2 | (Austria) (Portugal) | Wolfgang Gnedt; Bruno Carvalho | 21; 18 | 18; 21 | 21; 11 |
| 3 | (Austria) (Portugal) | Kai Niederhuber; Gabriel Rodrigues | 18; 21 | 21; 12 | 21; 19 |
| 4 | (Austria) (Portugal) | Gustav Andree / Adi Pratama; Florian Alface / Bruno Carvalho | 21; 17 | 21; 14 |
| 5 | (Austria) (Portugal) | Philip Birker / Wolfgang Gnedt; Diogo Gloria / Gabriel Rodrigues | 21; 17 | 21; 19 |

==== Czech Republic vs. Austria ====
Czech Republic
4
BB Arena Štěrboholy, Court 1
9 December 2023, 14:00 UTC+1

Austria
1

| | | | 1 | 2 | 3 |
|---|---|---|---|---|---|
| 1 | (Czech Republic) (Austria) | Jan Louda; Luka Wraber | 21; 10 | 21; 7 |
| 2 | (Czech Republic) (Austria) | Jiří Král; Wolfgang Gnedt | 21; 12 | 21; 16 |
| 3 | (Czech Republic) (Austria) | Dominik Kopřiva; Adi Pratama | 19; 21 | 11; 21 |
| 4 | (Czech Republic) (Austria) | Ondřej Král / Adam Mendrek; Philip Birker / Kai Niederhuber | 21; 17 | 21; 17 |
| 5 | (Czech Republic) (Austria) | Vít Kulíšek / Tomáš Švejda; Wolfgang Gnedt / Adi Pratama | 21; 14 | 17; 21 | 21; 16 |

=== Subgroup 6B ===
| Pos | Team | Pld | W | L | MF | MA | MD | GF | GA | GD | PF | PA | PD | Pts | Qualification |
|---|---|---|---|---|---|---|---|---|---|---|---|---|---|---|---|
| 1 | Azerbaijan (Q) | 2 | 2 | 0 | 7 | 3 | +4 | 14 | 6 | +8 | 379 | 327 | +52 | 2 | Advance to decider |
| 2 | Ireland | 2 | 1 | 1 | 5 | 5 | 0 | 11 | 10 | +1 | 396 | 375 | +21 | 1 | |
| 3 | Norway | 2 | 0 | 2 | 3 | 7 | −4 | 6 | 15 | −9 | 354 | 427 | −73 | 0 | |

Source: BWF
(Q) Qualified to the phase indicated

==== Ireland vs. Norway ====
Ireland
3
BB Arena Štěrboholy, Court 1
7 December 2023, 10:00 UTC+1

Norway
2

| | | | 1 | 2 | 3 |
|---|---|---|---|---|---|
| 1 | (Republic of Ireland) (Norway) | Nhat Nguyen; Markus Barth | 22; 20 | 21; 9 |
| 2 | (Republic of Ireland) (Norway) | Jonathan Dolan; Vegard Rikheim | 21; 8 | 18; 21 | 15; 21 |
| 3 | (Republic of Ireland) (Norway) | Adam McAllister; Torjus Flåtten | 22; 24 | 17; 21 |
| 4 | (Republic of Ireland) (Norway) | Jonathan Dolan / Nhat Nguyen; Markus Barth / Mathias Hong | 22; 20 | 21; 12 |
| 5 | (Republic of Ireland) (Norway) | Joshua Magee / Paul Reynolds; Torjus Flåtten / Vegard Rikheim | 24; 22 | 22; 20 |

==== Azerbaijan vs. Norway ====
Azerbaijan
4
BB Arena Štěrboholy, Court 1
8 December 2023, 10:00 UTC+1

Norway
1

| | | | 1 | 2 | 3 |
|---|---|---|---|---|---|
| 1 | (Azerbaijan) (Norway) | Ade Resky Dwicahyo; Markus Barth | 21; 12 | 21; 14 |
| 2 | (Azerbaijan) (Norway) | Dicky Dwi Pangestu; Danila Gataullin | 21; 9 | 21; 12 |
| 3 | (Azerbaijan) (Norway) | Muhammad Khadafi; Jonas Østhassel | 21; 19 | 21; 13 |
| 4 | (Azerbaijan) (Norway) | Ade Resky Dwicahyo / Dicky Dwi Pangestu; Torjus Flåtten / Vegard Rikheim | 21; 16 | 21; 19 |
| 5 | (Azerbaijan) (Norway) | Agil Gabilov / Muhammad Khadafi; Mathias Hong / Jonas Østhassel | 17; 21 | 17; 21 |

==== Ireland vs. Azerbaijan ====
Ireland
2
BB Arena Štěrboholy, Court 1
9 December 2023, 10:00 UTC+1

Azerbaijan
3

| | | | 1 | 2 | 3 |
|---|---|---|---|---|---|
| 1 | (Republic of Ireland) (Azerbaijan) | Nhat Nguyen; Ade Resky Dwicahyo | 21; 17 | 21; 12 |
| 2 | (Republic of Ireland) (Azerbaijan) | Jonathan Dolan; Dicky Dwi Pangestu | 14; 21 | 16; 21 |
| 3 | (Republic of Ireland) (Azerbaijan) | Adam McAllister; Muhammad Khadafi | 19; 21 | 9; 21 |
| 4 | (Republic of Ireland) (Azerbaijan) | Joshua Magee / Paul Reynolds; Ade Resky Dwicahyo / Dicky Dwi Pangestu | 18; 21 | 11; 21 |
| 5 | (Republic of Ireland) (Azerbaijan) | Jonathan Dolan / Nhat Nguyen; Agil Gabilov / Muhammad Khadafi | 21; 12 | 21; 10 |

=== Decider ===
==== Czech Republic vs. Azerbaijan ====
Czech Republic
3
BB Arena Štěrboholy, Court 1
10 December 2023, 11:00 UTC+1

Azerbaijan
1

| | | | 1 | 2 | 3 |
|---|---|---|---|---|---|
| 1 | (Czech Republic) (Azerbaijan) | Jan Louda; Ade Resky Dwicahyo | 12; 21 | 22; 20 | 21; 11 |
| 2 | (Czech Republic) (Azerbaijan) | Jiří Král; Dicky Dwi Pangestu | 17; 21 | 21; 9 | 11; 21 |
| 3 | (Czech Republic) (Azerbaijan) | Dominik Kopřiva; Muhammad Khadafi | 21; 18 | 19; 21 | 21; 12 |
| 4 | (Czech Republic) (Azerbaijan) | Ondřej Král / Adam Mendrek; Ade Resky Dwicahyo / Dicky Dwi Pangestu | 21; 14 | 21; 12 |
| 5 | (Czech Republic) (Azerbaijan) | Vít Kulíšek / Tomáš Švejda; Agil Gabilov / Muhammad Khadafi |
