= 2021 European Mixed Team Badminton Championships qualification stage =

The following results are the 2021 European Mixed Team Badminton Championships' qualification stage.

== Summary ==
The qualification stage will hold between 9–12 December 2020 in 6 cities across Europe.

Group	Host city	Venue	Qualified team	Teams failed to qualify
1	(England) Milton Keynes	National Badminton Centre	England	Estonia; Hungary; Sweden
2	(Belgium) Antwerp	YONEX Centre	Russia	Belgium; Poland; Switzerland
3	(Austria) Linz	Olympiazentrum Linz	Netherlands	Austria; Czech Republic; Slovenia
4	~~(Germany) Dessau~~; Cancelled	~~Anhalt Arena~~	Germany	Bulgaria; Isle of Man; Slovenia
5	~~(France) Aire-sur-la-Lys~~; Cancelled	~~Complexe sportif régional~~	France	Iceland; Italy
5	~~(France) Aire-sur-la-Lys~~; Cancelled	~~Complexe sportif régional~~	France	Ireland; Norway; Wales
6	(Portugal) Caldas da Rainha	Badminton High Performance Sports Centre	Scotland	Spain; Ukraine; Latvia; Portugal

§: Subgroup's winner.

- ^1 : Cancelled due to the withdrawal of 3 out of 4 teams.
- ^2 : Cancelled due to the qualification stage cannot be hosted in France or any of the other countries participating in this group.
- ^3 : Lithuania withdrew from this qualification stage.

== Group composition ==
Group 1	Group 2	Group 3	Group 4	Group 5	Group 6
England (H); Hungary; Sweden; Estonia	Russia; Switzerland; Belgium (H); Poland	Netherlands; Slovakia; Czech Republic; Austria (H)	Germany (H); Isle of Man; Slovenia; Bulgaria	France (H); Italy; Iceland	Spain; Scotland; Ukraine
England (H); Hungary; Sweden; Estonia	Russia; Switzerland; Belgium (H); Poland	Netherlands; Slovakia; Czech Republic; Austria (H)	Germany (H); Isle of Man; Slovenia; Bulgaria	Wales; Ireland; Norway	Latvia; Portugal (H); Lithuania

== Group 1 ==
Pos	Team	Pld	W	L	GF	GA	GD	PF	PA	PD	Pts	Qualification
1	England (H)	3	3	0	22	9	+13	599	452	+147	3	Advance to Quarter-finals
2	Estonia	3	2	1	17	15	+2	539	571	−32	2	
3	Sweden	3	1	2	17	16	+1	588	566	+22	1	
4	Hungary	3	0	3	8	24	−16	478	615	−137	0	

Source: TS
(H) Host

=== Sweden vs. Estonia ===
Sweden
2
National Badminton Centre, Court 1
10 December 2020, 10:00 UTC+0

Estonia
3

			1	2	3
1	(Sweden) (Estonia)	Melker Z-Bexell / Tilda Sjöö; Kristjan Kaljurand / Helina Rüütel	21; 19	10; 21	21; 15
2	(Sweden) (Estonia)	Felix Burestedt; Mikk Järveoja	21; 5	21; 8
3	(Sweden) (Estonia)	Ashwathi Pillai; Kristin Kuuba	13; 21	21; 23
4	(Sweden) (Estonia)	Joel Hansson / Melker Z-Bexell; Kristjan Kaljurand / Raul Käsner	18; 21	21; 11	14; 21
5	(Sweden) (Estonia)	Johanna Magnusson / Moa Sjöö; Kristin Kuuba / Helina Rüütel	16; 21	18; 21

=== England vs. Hungary ===
England
4
National Badminton Centre, Court 1
10 December 2020, 14:00 UTC+0

Hungary
1

			1	2	3
1	(England) (Hungary)	Toby Penty; Gergely Krausz	21; 16	16; 21	21; 12
2	(England) (Hungary)	Freya Redfearn; Laura Sárosi	17; 21	16; 21
3	(England) (Hungary)	Ben Lane / Sean Vendy; Gergő Pytel / Gergely Szita	21; 10	21; 13
4	(England) (Hungary)	Chloe Birch / Jenny Moore; Vivien Sándorházi / Laura Sárosi	21; 7	21; 12
5	(England) (Hungary)	Marcus Ellis / Lauren Smith; Gregely Szita / Daniella Gonda	21; 1	21; 11

=== Sweden vs. Hungary ===
Sweden
4
National Badminton Centre, Court 1
11 December 2020, 10:00 UTC+0

Hungary
1

			1	2	3
1	(Sweden) (Hungary)	Felix Burestedt; Gergely Krausz	15; 21	15; 21
2	(Sweden) (Hungary)	Ashwathi Pillai; Daniella Gonda	7; 21	21; 12	21; 10
3	(Sweden) (Hungary)	Joel Hansson / Melker Z-Bexell; Gergely Krausz / Gergő Pytel	21; 17	21; 18
4	(Sweden) (Hungary)	Moa Sjöö / Tilda Sjöö; Vivien Sándorházi / Laura Sárosi	21; 10	21; 13
5	(Sweden) (Hungary)	Melker Z-Bexell / Johanna Magnusson; Gergő Pytel / Daniella Gonda	21; 13	21; 15

=== England vs. Estonia ===
England
4
National Badminton Centre, Court 1
11 December 2020, 14:00 UTC+0

Estonia
1

			1	2	3
1	(England) (Estonia)	Harry Huang; Mikk Järveoja	21; 7	21; 8
2	(England) (Estonia)	Grace King; Kristin Kuuba	16; 21	10; 21
3	(England) (Estonia)	Ben Lane / Sean Vendy; Kristjan Kaljurand / Raul Käsner	21; 15	21; 12
4	(England) (Estonia)	Chloe Birch / Lauren Smith; Catlyn Kruus / Helina Rüütel	21; 17	21; 13
5	(England) (Estonia)	Chris Adcock / Gabby Adcock; Raul Käsner / Kristin Kuuba	21; 14	21; 11

=== Estonia vs. Hungary ===
Estonia
4
National Badminton Centre, Court 1
12 December 2020, 10:00 UTC+0

Hungary
1

			1	2	3
1	(Estonia) (Hungary)	Kristjan Kaljurand / Helina Rüütel; Gergely Krausz / Daniella Gonda	21; 18	21; 18
2	(Estonia) (Hungary)	Mikk Järveoja; Gergő Pytel	10; 21	15; 21
3	(Estonia) (Hungary)	Kristin Kuuba; Vivien Sándorházi	21; 16	21; 3
4	(Estonia) (Hungary)	Kristjan Kaljurand / Raul Käsner; Gergő Pytel / Gergely Szita	21; 12	21; 17
5	(Estonia) (Hungary)	Kristin Kuuba / Helina Rüütel; Daniella Gonda / Laura Sárosi	21; 17	21; 19

=== England vs. Sweden ===
England
3
National Badminton Centre, Court 1
12 December 2020, 14:00 UTC+0

Sweden
2

			1	2	3
1	(England) (Sweden)	Marcus Ellis / Lauren Smith; Melker Z-Bexell / Johanna Magnusson	21; 14	21; 14
2	(England) (Sweden)	Harry Huang; Felix Burestedt	8; 21	15; 21
3	(England) (Sweden)	Freya Redfearn; Ashwathi Pillai	19; 21	20; 22
4	(England) (Sweden)	Ben Lane / Sean Vendy; Joel Hansson / Melker Z-Bexell	21; 13	21; 13
5	(England) (Sweden)	Chloe Birch / Lauren Smith; Moa Sjöö / Tilda Sjöö	21; 13	21; 16

== Group 2 ==
Pos	Team	Pld	W	L	GF	GA	GD	PF	PA	PD	Pts	Qualification
1	Russia	3	3	0	30	3	+27	681	398	+283	3	Advance to Quarter-finals
2	Belgium (H)	3	2	1	14	20	−6	551	634	−83	2	
3	Switzerland	3	1	2	16	20	−4	624	680	−56	1	
4	Poland	3	0	3	8	25	−17	505	649	−144	0	

Source: TS
(H) Host

=== Russia vs. Poland ===
Russia
5
YONEX Centre, Court 1
10 December 2020, 14:00 UTC+1

Poland
0

			1	2	3
1	(Russia) (Poland)	Vladimir Malkov; Mikołaj Szymanowski	21; 15	21; 11
2	(Russia) (Poland)	Evgeniya Kosetskaya; Wiktoria Dąbczyńska	21; 11	21; 8
3	(Russia) (Poland)	Vladimir Ivanov / Ivan Sozonov; Maciej Matusz / Wiktor Trecki	21; 9	21; 9
4	(Russia) (Poland)	Anastasiia Akchurina / Olga Morozova; Anastasia Khomich / Karolina Szubert	21; 16	21; 10
5	(Russia) (Poland)	Rodion Alimov / Alina Davletova; Paweł Śmiłowski / Wiktoria Adamek	21; 10	21; 9

=== Switzerland vs. Belgium ===
Switzerland
2
YONEX Centre, Court 1
10 December 2020, 19:00 UTC+1

Belgium
3

			1	2	3
1	(Switzerland) (Belgium)	Tobias Künzi / Jenjira Stadelmann; Jona van Nieuwkerke / Lise Jaques	21; 15	20; 22	14; 21
2	(Switzerland) (Belgium)	Christian Kirchmayr; Maxime Moreels	14; 21	21; 19	15; 21
3	(Switzerland) (Belgium)	Sabrina Jaquet; Lianne Tan	13; 21	14; 21
4	(Switzerland) (Belgium)	Tobias Künzi / Nicolas A. Müller; Julien Carraggi / Jona van Nieuwkerke	21; 19	21; 18
5	(Switzerland) (Belgium)	Sabrina Jaquet / Jenjira Stadelmann; Lise Jaques / Mare van Britsom	21; 18	21; 14

=== Switzerland vs. Poland ===
Switzerland
4
YONEX Centre, Court 1
11 December 2020, 14:00 UTC+1

Poland
1

			1	2	3
1	(Switzerland) (Poland)	Tobias Künzi / Jenjira Stadelmann; Paweł Śmiłowski / Wiktoria Adamek	17; 21	20; 22
2	(Switzerland) (Poland)	Christian Kirchmayr; Michał Rogalski	14; 21	21; 14	25; 23
3	(Switzerland) (Poland)	Ronja Stern; Zuzanna Jankowska	21; 19	21; 7
4	(Switzerland) (Poland)	Tobias Künzi / Nicolas A. Müller; Maciej Matusz / Wiktor Trecki	21; 16	21; 18
5	(Switzerland) (Poland)	Caroline Racloz / Jenjira Stadelmann; Wiktoria Dąbczyńska / Anastasia Khomich	21; 12	17; 21	21; 14

=== Russia vs. Belgium ===
Russia
5
YONEX Centre, Court 1
11 December 2020, 19:00 UTC+1

Belgium
0

			1	2	3
1	(Russia) (Belgium)	Vladimir Malkov; Maxime Moreels	21; 8	19; 21	21; 16
2	(Russia) (Belgium)	Evgeniya Kosetskaya; Lianne Tan	21; 15	21; 13
3	(Russia) (Belgium)	Vladimir Ivanov / Ivan Sozonov; Julien Carraggi / Jona van Nieuwkerke	21; 15	21; 14
4	(Russia) (Belgium)	Anastasiia Akchurina / Olga Morozova; Lotte Geerts / Mare van Britsom	21; 6	21; 2
5	(Russia) (Belgium)	Rodion Alimov / Alina Davletova; Jona van Nieuwkerke / Lise Jaques	21; 9	21; 3

=== Russia vs. Switzerland ===
Russia
5
YONEX Centre, Court 1
12 December 2020, 10:00 UTC+1

Switzerland
0

			1	2	3
1	(Russia) (Switzerland)	Evgeniya Kosetskaya; Ronja Stern	21; 14	21; 11
2	(Russia) (Switzerland)	Vladimir Malkov; Tobias Künzi	12; 21	21; 18	21; 11
3	(Russia) (Switzerland)	Anastasiia Akchurina / Olga Morozova; Caroline Racloz / Jenjira Stadelmann	20; 22	21; 17	21; 15
4	(Russia) (Switzerland)	Vladimir Ivanov / Ivan Sozonov; Tobias Künzi / Nicolas A. Müller	21; 11	21; 12
5	(Russia) (Switzerland)	Rodion Alimov / Alina Davletova; Yann Orteu / Caroline Racloz	21; 9	21; 7

=== Belgium vs. Poland ===
Belgium
3
YONEX Centre, Court 1
12 December 2020, 15:00 UTC+1

Poland
2

			1	2	3
1	(Belgium) (Poland)	Lianne Tan; Anastasia Khomich	21; 17	21; 16
2	(Belgium) (Poland)	Maxime Moreels; Mikołaj Szymanowski	21; 15	21; 9
3	(Belgium) (Poland)	Lise Jaques / Lien Lammertyn; Wiktoria Dąbczyńska / Karolina Szubert	10; 21	12; 21
4	(Belgium) (Poland)	Elias Bracke / Julien Carraggi; Jakub Melaniuk / Szymon Ślepecki	21; 12	22; 20
5	(Belgium) (Poland)	Jona van Nieuwkerke / Lise Jaques; Paweł Śmiłowski / Wiktoria Adamek	21; 16	14; 21	15; 21

== Group 3 ==
Pos	Team	Pld	W	L	GF	GA	GD	PF	PA	PD	Pts	Qualification
1	Netherlands	3	3	0	24	10	+14	642	527	+115	3	Advance to Quarter-finals
2	Austria (H)	3	2	1	16	19	−3	640	686	−46	2	
3	Czech Republic	3	1	2	19	15	+4	655	603	+52	1	
4	Slovakia	3	0	3	10	25	−15	561	682	−121	0	

Source: TS
(H) Host

=== Netherlands vs. Slovakia ===
Netherlands
4
Olympianzentrum Linz, Court 1
10 December 2020, 10:00 UTC+1

Slovakia
1

			1	2	3
1	(Netherlands) (Slovakia)	Ties van der Lecq / Debora Jille; Andrej Antoska / Natalia Tomcova	21; 11	21; 10
2	(Netherlands) (Slovakia)	Joran Kweekel; Milan Dratva	14; 21	21; 11	21; 17
3	(Netherlands) (Slovakia)	Nadia Choikri; Martina Repiská	10; 21	21; 16	17; 21
4	(Netherlands) (Slovakia)	Mark Caljouw / Ties van der Lecq; Andrej Antoska / Jakub Horak	21; 9	21; 13
5	(Netherlands) (Slovakia)	Debora Jille / Cheryl Seinen; Natalia Tomcova / Katarina Vargova	21; 10	21; 12

=== Czech Republic vs. Austria ===
Czech Republic
2
Olympianzentrum Linz, Court 1
10 December 2020, 18:00 UTC+1

Austria
3

			1	2	3
1	(Czech Republic) (Austria)	Ondřej Král / Tereza Švábíková; Philip Birker / Katharina Hochmeir	21; 23	19; 21
2	(Czech Republic) (Austria)	Milan Ludík; Leon Seiwald	16; 21	17; 21
3	(Czech Republic) (Austria)	Kateřina Tomalová; Katrin Neudolt	21; 17	21; 14
4	(Czech Republic) (Austria)	Ondřej Král / Jan Louda; Philip Birker / Dominik Stipsits	21; 23	26; 24	17; 21
5	(Czech Republic) (Austria)	Tereza Švábíková / Kateřina Tomalová; Serena Au Yeong / Katharina Hochmeir	21; 17	22; 24	21; 19

=== Czech Republic vs. Slovakia ===
Czech Republic
4
Olympianzentrum Linz, Court 1
11 December 2020, 13:00 UTC+1

Slovakia
1

			1	2	3
1	(Czech Republic) (Slovakia)	Ondřej Král / Sabina Milova; Milan Dratva / Katarina Vargova	19; 21	21; 18	11; 21
2	(Czech Republic) (Slovakia)	Tereza Švábíková; Martina Repiská	21; 8	21; 15
3	(Czech Republic) (Slovakia)	Jan Louda; Milan Dratva	21; 19	21; 13
4	(Czech Republic) (Slovakia)	Tereza Švábíková / Kateřina Tomalová; Martina Repiská / Katarina Vargova	21; 14	22; 20
5	(Czech Republic) (Slovakia)	Ondřej Král / Adam Mendrek; Andrej Antoska / Jakub Horak	21; 15	21; 13

=== Netherlands vs. Austria ===
Netherlands
4
Olympianzentrum Linz, Court 1
11 December 2020, 18:00 UTC+1

Austria
1

			1	2	3
1	(Netherlands) (Austria)	Ties van der Lecq / Debora Jille; Dominik Stipsits / Serena Au Yeong	26; 24	21; 17
2	(Netherlands) (Austria)	Mark Caljouw; Wolfgang Gnedt	21; 7	21; 14
3	(Netherlands) (Austria)	Jaymie Laurens; Jenny Ertl	21; 12	21; 10
4	(Netherlands) (Austria)	Joran Kweekel / Ties van der Lecq; Philip Birker / Dominik Stipsits	17; 21	21; 14	20; 22
5	(Netherlands) (Austria)	Debora Jille / Cheryl Seinen; Serena Au Yeong / Katharina Hochmeir	21; 13	21; 9

=== Netherlands vs. Czech Republic ===
Netherlands
3
Olympianzentrum Linz, Court 1
12 December 2020, 11:00 UTC+1

Czech Republic
2

			1	2	3
1	(Netherlands) (Czech Republic)	Ties van der Lecq / Debora Jille; Ondřej Král / Tereza Švábíková	21; 11	20; 22	21; 15
2	(Netherlands) (Czech Republic)	Mark Caljouw; Jan Louda	21; 17	21; 14
3	(Netherlands) (Czech Republic)	Nadia Choikri; Tereza Švábíková	18; 21	17; 21
4	(Netherlands) (Czech Republic)	Joran Kweekel / Ties van der Lecq; Ondřej Král / Adam Mendrek				w/o
5	(Netherlands) (Czech Republic)	Debora Jille / Cheryl Seinen; Sabina Milova / Tallulah Sharleen van Coppenolle	21; 15	21; 14

=== Austria vs. Slovakia ===
Austria
3
Olympianzentrum Linz, Court 1
12 December 2020, 16:00 UTC+1

Slovakia
2

			1	2	3
1	(Austria) (Slovakia)	Dominik Stipsits / Serena Au Yeong; Milan Dratva / Katarina Vargova	21; 13	21; 15
2	(Austria) (Slovakia)	Katrin Neudolt; Martina Repiská	19; 21	21; 19	19; 21
3	(Austria) (Slovakia)	Wolfgang Gnedt; Milan Dratva	18; 21	18; 21
4	(Austria) (Slovakia)	Serena Au Yeong / Katharina Hochmeir; Martina Repiská / Katarina Vargova	21; 14	11; 21	21; 14
5	(Austria) (Slovakia)	Philip Birker / Dominik Stipsits; Andrej Antoska / Jakub Horak	21; 19	21; 13

== Group 6 ==
Pos	Team	Pld	W	L	GF	GA	GD	PF	PA	PD	Pts	Qualification
1	Scotland	4	4	0	32	9	+23	795	495	+300	4	Advance to Quarter-finals
2	Spain	4	3	1	33	10	+23	837	610	+227	3	
3	Ukraine	4	2	2	21	24	−3	767	781	−14	2	
4	Portugal (H)	4	1	3	20	24	−4	712	767	−55	1	
5	Latvia	4	0	4	1	40	−39	400	858	−458	0	

Source: TS
(H) Host

=== Latvia vs. Portugal ===
Latvia
0
Badminton High Performance Sports Centre, Court 1
9 December 2020, 10:00 UTC+0

Portugal
5

			1	2	3
1	(Latvia) (Portugal)	Reinis Sefers / Liana Lenceviva; Bernardo Atilano / Mariana Chang	8; 21	10; 21
2	(Latvia) (Portugal)	Jekaterina Romanova; Sonia Gonçalves	17; 21	11; 21
3	(Latvia) (Portugal)	Andis Bērziņš; Bernardo Atilano	12; 21	8; 21
4	(Latvia) (Portugal)	Liana Lencevica / Jekaterina Romanova; Adriana F. Gonçalves / Sonia Gonçalves	15; 21	16; 21
5	(Latvia) (Portugal)	Andis Bērziņš / Reinis Sefers; Bruno Carvalho / Tomás Nero	7; 21	7; 21

=== Spain vs. Ukraine ===
Spain
5
Badminton High Performance Sports Centre, Court 2
9 December 2020, 10:00 UTC+0

Ukraine
0

			1	2	3
1	(Spain) (Ukraine)	Clara Azurmendi; Marija Ulitina	21; 11	21; 18
2	(Spain) (Ukraine)	Pablo Abián; Danylo Bosniuk	21; 15	19; 21	21; 3
3	(Spain) (Ukraine)	Beatriz Corrales / Paula López; Anastasiya Prozorova / Valeriya Rudakova	21; 16	24; 22
4	(Spain) (Ukraine)	Luís Enrique Peñalver / Alberto Zapico; Ivan Druzchenko / Ivan Medynskiy	21; 14	21; 15
5	(Spain) (Ukraine)	Pablo Abián / Lorena Uslé; Danylo Bosniuk / Anastasiya Prozorova	21; 7	21; 11

=== Scotland vs. Portugal ===
Scotland
4
Badminton High Performance Sports Centre, Court 1
10 December 2020, 10:00 UTC+0

Portugal
1

			1	2	3
1	(Scotland) (Portugal)	Adam Hall / Julie MacPherson; Tomás Nero / Mariana Chang	21; 5	21; 6
2	(Scotland) (Portugal)	Joshua Apiliga; Bernardo Atilano	7; 21	17; 21
3	(Scotland) (Portugal)	Kirsty Gilmour; Adriana F. Gonçalves	21; 5	21; 7
4	(Scotland) (Portugal)	Christopher Grimley / Adam Hall; Bruno Carvalho / Tomás Nero	21; 11	21; 10
5	(Scotland) (Portugal)	Julie MacPherson / Ciara Torrance; Adriana F. Gonçalves / Sonia Gonçalves	21; 14	21; 7

=== Ukraine vs. Latvia ===
Ukraine
5
Badminton High Performance Sports Centre, Court 2
10 December 2020, 10:00 UTC+0

Latvia
0

			1	2	3
1	(Ukraine) (Latvia)	Danylo Dosniuk / Valeriya Rudakova; Reinis Sefers / Liana Lencevica	21; 6	21; 8
2	(Ukraine) (Latvia)	Artem Pochtarov; Andis Bērziņš	21; 5	21; 12
3	(Ukraine) (Latvia)	Marija Ulitina; Jekaterina Romanova	21; 18	18; 21	21; 9
4	(Ukraine) (Latvia)	Ivan Druzchenko / Ivan Medynskiy; Andis Bērziņš / Reinis Sefers	21; 9	21; 13
5	(Ukraine) (Latvia)	Polina Buhrova / Mariia Stoliarenko; Liana Lencevica / Jekaterina Romanova	21; 7	21; 14

=== Spain vs. Latvia ===
Spain
5
Badminton High Performance Sports Centre, Court 1
10 December 2020, 17:00 UTC+0

Latvia
0

			1	2	3
1	(Spain) (Latvia)	Alberto Zapico / Lorena Uslé; Reinis Sefers / Liana Lencevica	21; 8	21; 8
2	(Spain) (Latvia)	Alejandro Alcalá; Andis Bērziņš	21; 8	21; 4
3	(Spain) (Latvia)	Beatriz Corrales; Jekaterina Romanova	21; 14	21; 10
4	(Spain) (Latvia)	Pablo Abián / Luís Enrique Peñalver; Andis Bērziņš / Reinis Sefers	21; 9	21; 10
5	(Spain) (Latvia)	Clara Azurmendi / Paula López; Liana Lencevica / Jekaterina Romanova	21; 13	21; 12

=== Scotland vs. Ukraine ===
Scotland
4
Badminton High Performance Sports Centre, Court 2
10 December 2020, 17:00 UTC+0

Ukraine
1

			1	2	3
1	(Scotland) (Ukraine)	Adam Hall / Julie MacPherson; Viacheslav Yakovlev / Mariia Stoliarenko	21; 11	21; 12
2	(Scotland) (Ukraine)	Ciar Pringle; Danylo Bosniuk	16; 21	15; 21
3	(Scotland) (Ukraine)	Kirsty Gilmour; Polina Buhrova	21; 16	21; 7
4	(Scotland) (Ukraine)	Christopher Grimley / Adam Hall; Ivan Druzchenko / Viacheslav Yakovlev	21; 8	21; 12
5	(Scotland) (Ukraine)	Julie MacPherson / Ciara Torrance; Anastasiya Prozorova / Valeriya Rudakova	21; 15	21; 17

=== Spain vs. Portugal ===
Spain
4
Badminton High Performance Sports Centre, Court 1
11 December 2020, 10:00 UTC+0

Portugal
1

			1	2	3
1	(Spain) (Portugal)	Luís Enrique Peñalver; Duarte Nuno Anjo	21; 14	21; 11
2	(Spain) (Portugal)	Beatriz Corrales; Adriana F. Gonçalves	21; 9	21; 11
3	(Spain) (Portugal)	Pablo Abián / Alberto Zapico; Bruno Carvalho / Tomás Nero	19; 21	21; 14	21; 16
4	(Spain) (Portugal)	Clara Azurmendi / Lorena Uslé; Adriana F. Gonçalves / Sonia Gonçalves	21; 14	21; 15
5	(Spain) (Portugal)	Alejandro Alcalá / Paula López; Bernardo Atilano / Mariana Chang	17; 21	14; 21

=== Scotland vs. Latvia ===
Scotland
5
Badminton High Performance Sports Centre, Court 2
11 December 2020, 10:00 UTC+0

Latvia
0

			1	2	3
1	(Scotland) (Latvia)	Christopher Grimley / Ciara Torrance; Reinis Sefers / Liana Lencevica	21; 9	21; 7
2	(Scotland) (Latvia)	Joshua Apiliga; Andis Bērziņš	21; 7	21; 6
3	(Scotland) (Latvia)	Kirsty Gilmour; Jekaterina Romanova	21; 6	21; 6
4	(Scotland) (Latvia)	Christopher Grimley / Adam Hall; Andis Bērziņš / Reinis Sefers	21; 9	21; 7
5	(Scotland) (Latvia)	Julie MacPherson / Holly Newall; Liana Lencevica / Jekaterina Romanova	21; 7	21; 7

=== Ukraine vs. Portugal ===
Ukraine
3
Badminton High Performance Sports Centre, Court 1
12 December 2020, 10:00 UTC+0

Portugal
2

			1	2	3
1	(Ukraine) (Portugal)	Marija Ulitina; Sonia Gonçalves	21; 16	21; 14
2	(Ukraine) (Portugal)	Danylo Bosniuk; Bernardo Atilano	10; 21	21; 16	18; 21
3	(Ukraine) (Portugal)	Anastasiya Prozorova / Valeriya Rudakova; Adriana F. Gonçalves / Sonia Gonçalves	17; 21	21; 18	21; 9
4	(Ukraine) (Portugal)	Ivan Druzchenko / Ivan Medynskiy; Bruno Carvalho / Tomás Nero	19; 21	21; 17	14; 21
5	(Ukraine) (Portugal)	Artem Pochtarov / Anastasiya Prozorova; Bernardo Atilano / Mariana Chang	21; 18	21; 15

=== Spain vs. Scotland ===
Spain
2
Badminton High Performance Sports Centre, Court 2
12 December 2020, 10:00 UTC+0

Scotland
3

			1	2	3
1	(Spain) (Scotland)	Pablo Abián / Lorena Uslé; Adam Hall / Julie MacPherson	10; 21	13; 21
2	(Spain) (Scotland)	Clara Azurmendi; Kirsty Gilmour	21; 18	21; 4
3	(Spain) (Scotland)	Pablo Abián; Ciar Pringle	21; 9	21; 16
4	(Spain) (Scotland)	Clara Azurmendi / Beatriz Corrales; Julie MacPherson / Ciara Torrance	21; 19	15; 21	21; 23
5	(Spain) (Scotland)	Luís Enrique Peñalver / Alberto Zapico; Christopher Grimley / Adam Hall	8; 21	5; 21
