= 2003 Sudirman Cup =

Tournament details
- Dates: 18 – 23 March
- Edition: 8th
- Level: International
- Venue: Eindhoven Indoor Sports Center
- Location: Eindhoven, Netherlands

The 2003 Sudirman Cup was the 8th tournament of the World Mixed Team Badminton Championships of Sudirman Cup. It was held from March 18 to March 23, 2003, in Eindhoven, Netherlands. South Korea won in this eighth edition of the championship against China in the final 3–1.

== Host city selection ==
International Badminton Federation decided to split the IBF World Championships and the Sudirman Cup as separate tournaments starting from 2003. Canada, China, England, Hong Kong, and the Netherlands were the countries interested in hosting the tournaments. Netherlands later announced as host for the first standalone Sudirman Cup tournament.

== Results ==
=== Group 1 ===
==== Subgroup 1A ====
Team one	Team two	Score
South Korea	Sweden	5-0
China	Sweden	5-0
China	South Korea	3-2

==== Subgroup 1B ====
Team one	Team two	Score
Denmark	England	4-1
Indonesia	England	3-2
Denmark	Indonesia	4-1

==== Relegation playoff ====
Team one	Team two	Score
England	Sweden	3-0

==== Semi-finals ====
Team one	Team two	Score
China	Indonesia	3-1
South Korea	Denmark	3-2

==== Final ====
South Korea
3
Eindhoven, Netherlands

China
1

			1	2	3
1	(South Korea) (China)	Kim Dong-moon / Ra Kyung-min; Zhang Jun / Gao Ling	11; 8	11; 0
2	(South Korea) (China)	Jun Jae-youn; Gong Ruina	11; 7	7; 11	2; 11
3	(South Korea) (China)	Lee Hyun-il; Chen Hong	15; 10	15; 12
4	(South Korea) (China)	Lee Dong-soo / Yoo Yong-sung; Zhang Wei / Cai Yun	15; 3	17; 14
5	(South Korea) (China)	Ra Kyung-min / Lee Kyung-won; Wei Yili / Zhao Tingting				not played

2003 Sudirman Cup Champions

South Korea
Third title

=== Group 2 ===
==== Subgroup 2A ====
Team one	Team two	Score
Hong Kong	Netherlands	3-2
Hong Kong	Germany	3-2
Hong Kong	Ukraine	4-1
Netherlands	Germany	4-1
Netherlands	Ukraine	5-0
Germany	Ukraine	5-0

==== Subgroup 2B ====
Team one	Team two	Score
Malaysia	Japan	3-2
Malaysia	Chinese Taipei	3-2
Malaysia	Scotland	5-0
Japan	Chinese Taipei	4-1
Japan	Scotland	5-0
Chinese Taipei	Scotland	5-0

==== Playoff ====
Team one	Team two	Score	Notes
Hong Kong	Malaysia	3-2	7th-8th
Japan	Netherlands	3-0	9th-10th
Chinese Taipei	Germany	3-2	11th-12th
Ukraine	Scotland	3-0	13th-14th

=== Group 3 ===
==== Subgroup 3A ====
Team one	Team two	Score
India	Bulgaria	3-2
India	Wales	4-1
India	Austria	4-1
Bulgaria	Wales	3-2
Bulgaria	Austria	4-1
Wales	Austria	5-0

==== Subgroup 3B ====
Team one	Team two	Score
Russia	Finland	4-1
Russia	United States	4-1
Russia	Norway	5-0
Finland	United States	3-2
Finland	Norway	5-0
United States	Norway	5-0

==== Playoff ====
Team one	Team two	Score	Notes
Russia	India	3-2	15th-16th
Finland	Bulgaria	3-1	17th-18th
Wales	United States	3-2	19th-20th
Austria	Norway	3-0	21st-22nd

=== Group 4 ===
==== Subgroup 4A ====
Team one	Team two	Score
Poland	Spain	5-0
Poland	Switzerland	5-0
Poland	Belgium	5-0
Spain	Switzerland	3-2
Spain	Belgium	3-2
Switzerland	Belgium	3-2

==== Subgroup 4B ====
Team one	Team two	Score
France	Australia	3-2
France	Iceland	3-2
France	Czech Republic	4-1
Australia	Iceland	3-2
Australia	Czech Republic	4-1
Iceland	Czech Republic	3-2

==== Playoff ====
Team one	Team two	Score	Notes
Poland	France	3-1	23rd-24th
Spain	Australia	3-2	25th-26th
Iceland	Switzerland	3-0	27th-28th
Belgium	Czech Republic	3-1	29th-30th

=== Group 5 ===
==== Subgroup 5A ====
Team one	Team two	Score
Slovenia	South Africa	4-1
Slovenia	Estonia	3-2
Slovenia	Israel	5-0
South Africa	Estonia	3-2
South Africa	Israel	4-1
Estonia	Israel	4-1

==== Subgroup 5B ====
Team one	Team two	Score
Portugal	Kazakhstan	4-1
Portugal	Peru	4-1
Portugal	Slovakia	4-1
Kazakhstan	Peru	3-2
Kazakhstan	Slovakia	3-2
Peru	Slovakia	3-2

==== Playoff ====
Team one	Team two	Score	Notes
Portugal	Slovenia	3-1	31st-32nd
Kazakhstan	Belgium	3-1	33rd-34th
Peru	Estonia	3-0	35th-36th
Slovakia	Israel	3-0	37th-38th

=== Group 6 ===
==== Subgroup 6A ====
Team one	Team two	Score
Hungary	Cyprus	3-2
Hungary	Greece	4-1
Hungary	Latvia	5-0
Cyprus	Greece	3-2
Cyprus	Latvia	5-0
Greece	Latvia	5-0

=== Subgroup 6B ===
Team one	Team two	Score
Lithuania	Luxembourg	3-2
Lithuania	Greenland	5-0
Lithuania	Gibraltar	5-0
Luxembourg	Greenland	3-2
Luxembourg	Gibraltar	5-0
Greenland	Gibraltar	5-0

==== Playoff ====
Team one	Team two	Score	Notes
Hungary	Lithuania	3-2	39th-40th
Cyprus	Luxembourg	3-2	41st-42nd
Greece	Greenland	3-1	43rd-44th
Latvia	Gibraltar	3-1	45th-46th

=== Group 7 ===
Team one	Team two	Score
Jamaica	Turkey	3-2
Jamaica	Suriname	5-0
Jamaica	Faroe Islands	5-0
Turkey	Suriname	3-2
Turkey	Faroe Islands	4-1
Suriname	Faroe Islands	3-2

== Final classification ==
Group 1
Pos	Country
1	(South Korea) Korea
2	China
3	Indonesia
	Denmark
5	England
6	Sweden

Group 2
Pos	Country
7	Hong Kong
8	Malaysia
9	Japan
10	Netherlands
11	Chinese Taipei
12	Germany
13	Ukraine
14	Scotland

Group 3
Pos	Country
15	Russia
16	India
17	Finland
18	Bulgaria
19	Wales
20	United States
21	Austria
22	Norway

Group 4
Pos	Country
23	Poland
24	France
25	Spain
26	Australia
27	Iceland
28	Switzerland
29	Belgium
30	Czech Republic

Group 5
Pos	Country
31	Portugal
32	Slovenia
33	Kazakhstan
34	South Africa
35	Peru
36	Estonia
37	Slovakia
38	Israel

Group 6
Pos	Country
39	Hungary
40	Lithuania
41	Cyprus
42	Luxembourg
43	Greece
44	Greenland
45	Latvia
46	Gibraltar

Group 7
Pos	Country
47	Jamaica
48	Turkey
49	Suriname
50	Faroe Islands
