= Greenland national badminton team =

National badminton team representing Greenland

Greenland
- Association: Badminton Kalaallit Nunaat (BKN)
- Confederation: BE (Europe)
- President: Michael Kleist

BWF ranking
- Current ranking: 92 (2 January 2024)
- Highest ranking: 51 (2 July 2019)

Sudirman Cup
- Appearances: 1 (first in 2019)
- Best result: Group stage

European Men's Team Championships
- Appearances: 2 (first in 2018)
- Best result: Group stage

European Women's Team Championships
- Appearances: 1 (first in 2018)
- Best result: Group stage

The Greenland national badminton team (Danish: Grønlands badmintonlandshold; Greenlandic: Kalaallit Nunaannit sulorarnermi nunanut allanut unammisartut) is a badminton team located in Greenland, Denmark and represents the nation of Greenland in international badminton team competitions. It is controlled by the Greenland Badminton Federation, the governing body for badminton in Greenland.

Despite badminton not being popular in Greenland, the team has once participated in the Sudirman Cup, which was in 2019. Greenland has also recently been participating in the European Men's and Women's Team Badminton Championships. The team participates under Danish influence.

Greenland has only participated once in international BWF team tournaments and that was the 2019 Sudirman Cup. The Greenlandic team was placed into the Group 4 along with Kazakhstan and Macau. The team lost both group ties but won one match when Sara Lindskov Jacobsen beat Kazakhstan's Aisha Zhumabek. The team finished in 31st place on the rankings. The Greenlandic badminton team participates in the biennial Island Games. The mixed team lost the quarterfinals tie twice in 2015 and 2019. The team finally won gold in 2019 after defeating defending champions Guernsey.

== Competitive record ==
=== Thomas Cup ===
Year	Result
(England) 1949 to (China) 2016	Did not enter
(Thailand) 2018	Did not qualify
(Denmark) 2020	Did not qualify
(Thailand) 2022	Did not qualify
(China) 2024	Did not qualify
(Denmark) 2026	TBD
(N/A) 2028	TBD
(N/A) 2030	TBD

=== Uber Cup ===
Year	Result
(England) 1957 to (China) 2016	Did not enter
(Thailand) 2018	Did not qualify
(Denmark) 2020	Did not enter
(Thailand) 2022	Did not qualify
(China) 2024	Did not qualify
(Denmark) 2026	TBD
(N/A) 2028	TBD
(N/A) 2030	TBD

=== Sudirman Cup ===
Year	Result
(Indonesia) 1989 to (Denmark) 1999	Did not enter
(Spain) 2001	Group 7 − 51st
(Netherlands) 2003	Group 6 − 44th
(China) 2005	Did not enter
(Scotland) 2007	Did not enter
(China) 2009	Did not enter
(China) 2011	Did not enter
(Malaysia) 2013	Did not enter
(China) 2015	Did not enter
(Australia) 2017	Did not enter
(China) 2019	Group 4 − 31st
(Finland) 2021	Did not enter
(China) 2023	Did not qualify
(China) 2025	Did not enter
(N/A) 2027	TBD
(N/A) 2029	TBD

=== European Team Championships ===
==== Men's team ====
Year	Result
(Greece) 2006 to (Russia) 2016	Did not enter
(Russia) 2018	Group stage
(France) 2020	Group stage
(Poland) 2024	Did not qualify

==== Women's team ====
Year	Result
(Greece) 2006 to (Russia) 2016	Did not enter
(Russia) 2018	Group stage
(France) 2020	Did not enter
(Poland) 2024	Did not qualify

==== Mixed team ====
Year	Result
(Sweden) 1972 to (Finland) 2021	Did not enter
(France) 2023	Did not qualify
(Azerbaijan) 2025	Did not enter

=== Island Games ===
==== Mixed team ====
Year	Result
(Isle of Man) 1985	Did not enter
(Guernsey) 1987	Did not enter
(Faroe Islands) 1989	Quarter-finals
(Åland) 1991	Group A − 7th
(Isle of Wight) 1993	Group stage
(Gibraltar) 1995	Group stage
(Jersey) 1997	Group stage
(Gotland) 1999	Quarter-finals
(Isle of Man) 2001	Group A − 6th
(Guernsey) 2003	Quarter-finals
(Shetland) 2005	Fourth place
(Åland) 2009	(silver) Runner-up
(Isle of Wight) 2011	Fourth place
(Bermuda) 2013	Quarter-finals
(Jersey) 2015	Quarter-finals
(Gotland) 2017	Quarter-finals
(Gibraltar) 2019	(gold) Champions
(Guernsey) 2023	(silver) Runner-up

== Players ==
=== Current squad ===
As of 2 January 2024

==== Men's team ====
Name	DoB/Age	Ranking of event		
Name	DoB/Age	MS	MD	XD
Julian King	16 September 2004 (age 20)	-	-	-
Maluk Tiger	27 October 2004 (age 20)	-	-	-
Sebastian Reimer Bendtsen	1 June 1995 (age 29)	-	1331	-
Toke Ketwa-Driefer	7 October 1998 (age 26)	-	1331	-
Sequssuna Schmidt	13 May 1992 (age 32)	-	-	-
Taatsiannguaq Pedersen	11 January 1991 (age 34)	-	-	-

==== Women's team ====
Name	DoB/Age	Ranking of event		
Name	DoB/Age	WS	WD	XD
Milka Brønlund	24 April 1998 (age 26)	-	-	-
Nina Høegh	20 April 1993 (age 31)	-	-	-
Sara Lindskov	15 July 1994 (age 30)	-	-	-
Celia Villebro	19 September 1991 (age 33)	-	-	-
Cecilia Josenius	7 February 1997 (age 28)	-	-	-
Tina Amassen Rafaelsen	28 July 2002 (age 22)	-	-	-

=== Previous squads ===
==== European Team Championships ====
- Men's team: 2020
