= Gibraltar national badminton team =

National badminton team representing Gibraltar

Gibraltar
- Association: Gibraltar Badminton Association (GBA)
- Confederation: BE (Europe)
- President: Kasper Thy Jessen

BWF ranking
- Current ranking: Unranked (2 January 2024)
- Highest ranking: 123 (2 January 2019)

Sudirman Cup
- Appearances: 2 (first in 2001)
- Best result: Group stage

The Gibraltar national badminton team (Spanish: Equipo de bádminton de Gibraltar) represents Gibraltar in international badminton team competitions. It is controlled by the Gibraltar Badminton Association, the governing body for badminton in Gibraltar. The team have never competed in the European Men's and Women's Team Badminton Championships.

Gibraltar competed in the Sudirman Cup mixed team finals in 2001 and 2003. Gibraltar competed as the neutral "IBF Team" in the 2001 Sudirman Cup due to the Gibraltar dispute. An appeal by the Gibraltar Badminton Association to compete under the Gibraltar name and flag was rejected by the Court of Arbitration for Sport.

== Competitive record ==
=== Thomas Cup ===
| Year | Result |
|---|---|
| (England) 1949 to (Thailand) 2022 | Did not participate |
| (China) 2024 | TBD |
| (N/A) 2026 | TBD |
| (N/A) 2028 | TBD |
| (N/A) 2030 | TBD |

=== Uber Cup ===
| Year | Result |
|---|---|
| (England) 1957 to (Thailand) 2022 | Did not participate |
| (China) 2024 | TBD |
| (N/A) 2026 | TBD |
| (N/A) 2028 | TBD |
| (N/A) 2030 | TBD |

=== Sudirman Cup ===
| Year | Result |
|---|---|
| (Indonesia) 1989 to (Denmark) 1999 | Did not participate |
| (Spain) 2001 | Group 7 − 53rd |
| (Netherlands) 2003 | Group 6 − 46th |
| (China) 2005 | Did not participate |
| (Scotland) 2007 | Did not participate |
| (China) 2009 | Did not participate |
| (China) 2011 | Did not participate |
| (Malaysia) 2013 | Did not participate |
| (China) 2015 | Did not participate |
| (Australia) 2017 | Did not participate |
| (China) 2019 | Did not participate |
| (Finland) 2021 | Did not participate |
| (China) 2023 | Did not participate |
| (China) 2025 | TBD |
| (N/A) 2027 | TBD |
| (N/A) 2029 | TBD |

=== European Team Championships ===
==== Men's team ====
| Year | Result |
|---|---|
| (Greece) 2006 to (France) 2020 | Did not participate |
| (N/A) 2024 | TBD |

==== Women's team ====
| Year | Result |
|---|---|
| (Greece) 2006 to (France) 2020 | Did not participate |
| (N/A) 2024 | TBD |

==== Mixed team ====
| Year | Result |
|---|---|
| (Sweden) 1972 to (France) 2023 | Did not participate |
| (N/A) 2025 | TBD |

=== Island Games ===
==== Mixed team ====
| Year | Result |
|---|---|
| (Isle of Man) 1985 | Did not participate |
| (Guernsey) 1987 | Group stage |
| (Faroe Islands) 1989 | Group B − 10th |
| (Åland) 1991 | Did not participate |
| (Isle of Wight) 1993 | Group stage |
| (Gibraltar) 1995 | Group stage |
| (Jersey) 1997 | Group stage |
| (Gotland) 1999 | Group stage |
| (Isle of Man) 2001 | Did not participate |
| (Guernsey) 2003 | Group stage |
| (Shetland) 2005 | Group stage |
| (Åland) 2009 | Group C − 8th |
| (Isle of Wight) 2011 | Group C − 11th |
| (Bermuda) 2013 | Group A − 7th |
| (Jersey) 2015 | Group B − 8th |
| (Gotland) 2017 | Group B − 7th |
| (Gibraltar) 2019 | Group D − 10th |
| (Guernsey) 2023 | Group B − 12th |

== Players ==
=== Current squad ===
As of 2 January 2024

==== Men's team ====
| Name | DoB/Age | Ranking of event | | |
| Name | DoB/Age | MS | MD | XD |
|---|---|---|---|---|
| Henry Archer | 8 November 1999 (age 25) | - | - | - |
| Kasper Thy Jessen | 30 April 1984 (age 40) | - | - | - |
| Charles Avellano | 23 April 1984 (age 40) | - | - | - |
| James Linares | 17 May 1995 (age 29) | - | - | - |

==== Women's team ====
| Name | DoB/Age | Ranking of event | | |
| Name | DoB/Age | WS | WD | XD |
|---|---|---|---|---|
| Amber Prescott | 20 March 2004 (age 21) | - | - | - |
| Chantal De'Ath | 25 July 1992 (age 32) | - | - | - |
| Alison Jessen | 27 November 1980 (age 44) | - | - | - |
| Yanira Blagg | 18 February 2006 (age 19) | - | - | - |
