= Isle of Man national badminton team =

National badminton team representing the Isle of Man

Isle of Man
- Association: Isle of Man Badminton Association (IOMBA)
- Confederation: BE (Europe)
- President: Frank Anderson

BWF ranking
- Current ranking: Unranked (2 January 2024)
- Highest ranking: 112 (7 July 2014)

The Isle of Man national badminton team represents the Isle of Man in international badminton team competitions. It is controlled by the Isle of Man Badminton Association, the organization for badminton Isle of Man. The Manx team first competed in the Commonwealth Games in 2010.

The Manx team also competes in the biennial Island Games. The team have been runners-up twice in 2011 and 2013 and have achieved third place four times.

== Participation in Commonwealth Games ==
Mixed team

Year	Result
2010	Group stage

== Participation in Island Games ==
Mixed team

Year	Result
(Isle of Man) 1985	Fourth place
(Guernsey) 1987	Fourth place
(Faroe Islands) 1989	Group stage
(Åland) 1991	(bronze) Third place
(Isle of Wight) 1993	Group stage
(Gibraltar) 1995	(bronze) Third place
(Jersey) 1997	Fourth place
(Gotland) 1999	Quarter-finals
(Isle of Man) 2001	5th place
(Guernsey) 2003	Group stage

Year	Result
(Shetland) 2005	Group stage
(Åland) 2009	5th place
(Isle of Wight) 2011	(silver) Runner-up
(Bermuda) 2013	(silver) Runner-up
(Jersey) 2015	(bronze) Third place
(Gotland) 2017	(bronze) Third place
(Gibraltar) 2019	Fourth place
(Guernsey) 2023	Fourth place

== Players ==
=== Current squad ===
As of 2 January 2024

==== Men's team ====
Name	DoB/Age	Ranking of event		
Name	DoB/Age	MS	MD	XD
Benjamin Li	6 July 1993 (age 32)	-	-	-
Tobey Cheng	2000 (age 25–26)	-	-	-
Alexander Buck	2000 (age 25–26)	-	-	-

==== Women's team ====
Name	DoB/Age	Ranking of event		
Name	DoB/Age	WS	WD	XD
Jessica Li	23 March 1998 (age 27)	-	-	-
Mia Kirk	2002 (age 23–24)	-	-	-
Kimberly Clague	6 September 1988 (age 37)	-	-	-
