= Faroe Islands national badminton team =

National badminton team representing the Faroe Islands

Faroe Islands
- Association: Badmintonsamband Føroya (BSF)
- Confederation: BE (Europe)
- President: Johnny Grotinum

BWF ranking
- Current ranking: 122 ▼4 (2 January 2024)
- Highest ranking: 106 (3 January 2023)

Sudirman Cup
- Appearances: 1 (first in 2003)
- Best result: Group stage

Helvetia Cup
- Appearances: 2 (first in 2001)
- Best result: 19th (2001, 2003)

The Faroe Islands national badminton team (Faroese: Føroyska badmintonlandsliðið) represents Faroe Islands in international badminton team competitions. It is controlled by the Faroe Islands Badminton Association (Faroese: Badmintonsamband Føroya), the governing body for badminton in Faroe Islands.

The Faroese mixed team once participated the Sudirman Cup in 2003.

== Participation in BWF competitions ==
In the 2003 Sudirman Cup, the Faroese team was placed into the Group 7 classification group alongside Jamaica, Suriname and Turkey. The Faroe Islands lost the group ties and had a close fight in the tie with Suriname. The Faroe Islands lost with a score of 2-3 to Suriname. They finished in 50th place.

Sudirman Cup

Year	Result
(Netherlands) 2003	50th - Group 7

== Participation in Helvetia Cup ==
Year	Result
(Czech Republic) 2001	19th place
(Portugal) 2003	19th place

== Participation in Island Games ==
The Faroese team achieved runners-up position in the 2015 Island Games and were semifinalists at the 2019 Island Games.

Mixed team

Year	Result
(Guernsey) 1987	Quarter-finals
(Faroe Islands) 1989	Quarter-finals
(Åland) 1991	Group stage
(Isle of Wight) 1993	Group stage
(Gibraltar) 1995	Group stage
(Jersey) 1997	Group stage
(Gotland) 1999	Group stage
(Isle of Man) 2001	Group stage
(Guernsey) 2003	Group stage
(Shetland) 2005	Group stage
(Åland) 2009	(gold) Champions
(Isle of Wight) 2011	(bronze) Third place
(Bermuda) 2013	(bronze) Third place
(Jersey) 2015	(silver) Runner-up
(Gotland) 2017	Quarter-finals
(Gibraltar) 2019	(bronze) Third place

== Junior competitive record ==
=== Suhandinata Cup ===
==== Mixed team ====
Year	Result
(Spain) 2016	Group H2 - 44th of 52
(Canada) 2018	Group E - 24th of 39
(Russia) 2019	Group G - 38th of 43

=== European Junior Team Championships ===
==== Mixed Team ====
Year	Result
(Finland) 2020	Group stage

== Players ==
=== Current squad ===
As of 2 January 2024

==== Men's team ====
Name	DoB/Age	Ranking of event		
Name	DoB/Age	MS	MD	XD
Magnus Dal-Christiansen	10 June 1997 (age 27)	-	1110	1402
Jonas Djurhuus	24 April 2001 (age 23)	-	1110	1402
Asbjørn Olsen	17 February 2005 (age 20)	-	1301	-
Christian Berg Petersen	9 June 2006 (age 18)	-	1301	-
Árant Á Mýrini	17 October 2001 (age 23)	-	-	-

==== Women's team ====
Name	DoB/Age	Ranking of event		
Name	DoB/Age	WS	WD	XD
Bjarnhild Justinussen	21 August 2004 (age 20)	1183	871	-
Miriam Í Grótinum	5 September 2003 (age 21)	1183	871	-
Sanna Thorkildshøj	2 November 2004 (age 20)	1065	734	1402
Mia Thorkildshøj	2 November 2004 (age 20)	1065	734	1402
Ranja Joensen	15 July 2008 (age 16)	-	-	-
