= Badminton at the 2013 Island Games =

Badminton, for the 2013 Island Games, was held at the Jessie Vesey Sports Center. It is located at the Bermuda High School for Girls in Pembroke Parish, Bermuda. With a practice day on July 13, the events took place from 14 to 19 July 2013.

== Medal table ==
Final medal tally, based on the 2013 IG Badminton Medal Table page:

Rank	Nation	Gold	Silver	Bronze	Total
1	Guernsey (GGY)	3	3	1	7
2	Isle of Man (IOM)	1	2	1	4
3	Faroe Islands (FRO)	1	1	2	4
4	Greenland (GRL)	1	0	0	1
5	Menorca	0	0	2	2
Totals (5 entries)		6	6	6	18

=== Medal summary ===
Event	Gold	Silver	Bronze
Men's singles	Paul Le Tocq (GGY)	Benjamin Li (IOM)	Albert Navarro Comes (Menorca)
Men's doubles	Greenland; Bror Madsen; Taatsiannguaq Pedersen	Guernsey; Paul Le Tocq; Kevin Le Moigne	Menorca; Albert Navarro Comes; Eric Navarro Comes
Women's singles	Elena Johnson (GGY)	Gayle Lloyd (GGY)	Rannvá Djurhuus Carlsson (FRO)
Women's doubles	Isle of Man; Cristen Callow; Kimberley Clague	Faroe Islands; Brynhild Djurhuus Carlsson; Rannvá Djurhuus Carlsson	Guernsey; Sarah Garbutt; Elena Johnson
Mixed doubles	Faroe Islands; Rannvá Djurhuus Carlsson; Niclas Højgaard Eysturoy	Guernsey; Sarah Garbutt; Paul Le Tocq	Isle of Man; Kimberley Clague; Benjamin Li
Team	Guernsey; Sarah Garbutt; Elena Johnson; Gayle Lloyd; Emily Trebert; Stuart Hardy; Kevin Le Moigne; Daniel Penney; Jordan Trebert; Anika Johnson; Paul Le Tocq	Isle of Man; Cameron Avery; Kayleigh Callow; Neil Harding; Jessica Li; Laura Beggs; Kimberley Clague; Benjamin Li; Baillie Watterson; Cristen Callow; Kevin Harding	Faroe Islands; Brynhild Djurhuus Carlsson; Kristina Eriksen; Hilmar Kass Jacobsen; Guri Poulsen; Rannvá Djurhuus Carlsson; Niclas Højgaard Eysturoy; Flóvin Skaalum Mikkelsen; Rógvi Poul Poulsen; Magnus Dal-Christiansen; Sólfríð Hjørleifsdóttir
