= Cyprus national badminton team =

National badminton team representing Cyprus

Cyprus
- Association: Cyprus Badminton Federation (CBF)
- Confederation: BE (Europe)
- President: Panayiotis Hadjipandelis

BWF ranking
- Current ranking: 100 ▲4 (2 January 2024)
- Highest ranking: 68 (3 October 2013)

Sudirman Cup
- Appearances: 8 (first in 1993)
- Best result: Group stage

European Mixed Team Championships
- Appearances: 2 (first in 2009)
- Best result: Group stage

European Men's Team Championships
- Appearances: 1 (first in 2006)
- Best result: Group stage

European Women's Team Championships
- Appearances: 1 (first in 2006)
- Best result: Group stage

Helvetia Cup
- Appearances: 6 (first in 1995)
- Best result: 12th (1997, 2001)

The Cyprus national badminton team (Greek: Εθνική ομάδα μπάντμιντον Κύπρου; Turkish: Kıbrıs milli badminton takımı) represents Cyprus in international badminton team competitions. The national team trains in Strovolos, where the nation's governing body for badminton, the Cyprus Badminton Federation (CBF) is located. Cyprus competed in the Sudirman Cup from 1993 to 2007.

The Cypriot national team also competed in the now defunct Helvetia Cup. The team also competes in the Mediterranean Games and won their first badminton medal in the Games. The men's and women's team only competed once in the European Men's and Women's Team Badminton Championships.

== Competitive record ==
=== Thomas Cup ===
Year	Round	Pos
1949	Did not enter	
1952	Did not enter	
1955	Did not enter	
1958	Did not enter	
1961	Did not enter	
1964	Did not enter	
1967	Did not enter	
1970	Did not enter	
1973	Did not enter	
1976	Did not enter	
1979	Did not enter	
1982	Did not enter	
1984	Did not enter	
1986	Did not enter	
1988	Did not enter	
1990	Did not enter	
1992	Did not qualify	
1994	Did not qualify	
1996	Did not qualify	
1998	Did not enter	
2000	Did not enter	
2002	Did not enter	
2004	Did not qualify	

=== Sudirman Cup ===
Year	Result
1993	38th - Group 9
1995	43rd - Group 10
1997	48th - Group 7
1999	44th - Group 6
2001	44th - Group 6
2003	41st - Group 6
2005	38th - Group 5 Relegated
2007	47th - Group 6

=== European Team Championships ===
==== Men's team ====
Year	Result
(Greece) 2006	Group stage

==== Women's team ====
Year	Result
(Greece) 2006	Group stage

==== Mixed team ====
Year	Result
(England) 2009	Group stage
(Netherlands) 2011	Group stage

=== Helvetia Cup ===
Year	Result
(Cyprus) 1995	13th place
(France) 1997	12th place
(Czech Republic) 2001	12th place
(Portugal) 2003	14th place
(Cyprus) 2005	15th place
(Iceland) 2007	15th place

=== Mediterranean Team Championships ===
==== Mixed team ====
Year	Result
(Cyprus) 2019	4th place

== Junior competitive record ==
=== Suhandinata Cup ===
Year	Round	Pos
2000	Did not enter	
2002	Did not enter	
2004	Did not enter	
2006	Did not enter	
2007	Did not enter	
2008	Did not enter	
2009	Did not enter	
2010	Did not enter	
2011	Did not enter	
2012	Did not enter	
2013	Did not enter	
2014	Did not enter	
2015	Did not enter	
2016	Did not enter	
2017	Did not enter	
2018	Did not enter	
2019	Did not enter	
2022	Did not enter	
2023	Did not enter	
2024	Did not enter	
2025	Did not enter	
2026	Group stage	36th of 47

=== European Junior Team Championships ===
==== Mixed team ====
Year	Result
(Finland) 2011	Group stage
(Turkey) 2013	Group stage
(Poland) 2015	Group stage
(Estonia) 2018	Group stage
(Spain) 2024	Group stage

=== Finlandia Cup ===
Year	Result
(Czech Republic) 1994	12th place
(Portugal) 1996	16th place
(Finland) 1998	19th place
(Austria) 2000	18th place
(Slovenia) 2002	17th place
(Austria) 2004	17th place

== Players ==
=== Current squad ===
As of 2 January 2024

==== Men's team ====
Name	DoB/Age	Ranking of event		
Name	DoB/Age	MS	MD	XD
Aris Kattirtzi	12 September 2003 (age 23)	1339	-	-
Andreas Ioannou	19 February 1999 (age 27)	-	1301	-
Ioannis Tambourlas	28 September 2006 (age 20)	1623	1301	973
Iakovos Acheriotis	10 March 2003 (age 23)	-	-	-
Orestis Pissis	11 June 2001 (age 25)	-	-	-
Constantinos Symeonides	24 February 2004 (age 22)	-	-	-

==== Women's team ====
Name	DoB/Age	Ranking of event		
Name	DoB/Age	WS	WD	XD
Eleni Christodoulou	31 March 1999 (age 27)	285	510	837
Ioanna Pissi	25 July 2001 (age 25)	-	485	973
Chara Michael	27 November 2004 (age 21)	889	485	-
Eva Kattirtzi	12 September 2003 (age 23)	-	-	-
Ioanna Alexandrou	6 October 2004 (age 22)	-	-	-
Ioanna Antoniou	3 November 2004 (age 21)	-	-	-
