= Malta national badminton team =

National badminton team representing Malta

Malta
- Association: Badminton Malta (BM)
- Confederation: BE (Europe)
- President: Owen Grech

BWF ranking
- Current ranking: 107 ▼11 (2 January 2024)
- Highest ranking: 67 (3 January 2023)

Sudirman Cup
- Appearances: 4 (first in 1991)
- Best result: Group stage

Helvetia Cup
- Appearances: 3 (first in 1979)
- Best result: 12th (1983)

The Malta national badminton team (Maltese: Tim nazzjonali Malta tal-badminton) represents Malta in international badminton team competitions. The national team is controlled by Badminton Malta, the governing body for Maltese badminton. The Maltese competed in the Sudirman Cup from 1991 to 1997. In the last edition, they finished in 52nd place.

Seven time national champion, Matthew Abela became the first Maltese badminton player to represent Malta at the Summer Olympics in Tokyo, Japan.

== Participation in BWF competitions ==
=== Thomas Cup ===
Year	Round	Pos
1949	Did not enter	
1952	Did not enter	
1955	Did not enter	
1958	Did not enter	
1961	Did not enter	
1964	Withdrew	
1967	Did not enter	
1970	Did not enter	
1973	Did not enter	
1976	Did not enter	
1979	Did not enter	
1982	Did not enter	
1984	Did not enter	
1986	Did not enter	
1988	Did not enter	
1990	Did not enter	
1992	Did not qualify	
1994	Did not enter	
1996	Did not qualify	

Sudirman Cup

Year	Result
1991	35th - Group 8
1993	40th - Group 9
1995	46th - Group 11
1997	52nd - Group 7

== Participation in Helvetia Cup ==
Year	Result
1979	16th place
1983	12th place
1997	18th place

== Players ==
=== Current squad ===
As of 2 January 2024

==== Men's team ====
Name	DoB/Age	Ranking of event		
Name	DoB/Age	MS	MD	XD
Matthew Abela	18 March 1999 (age 27)	256	1189	-
Samuel Cassar	14 October 2001 (age 24)	481	924	731
Matthew Galea	1 December 2000 (age 25)	1671	924	1356
Nigel DeGaetano	14 May 1998 (age 28)	1735	1260	-

==== Women's team ====
Name	DoB/Age	Ranking of event		
Name	DoB/Age	WS	WD	XD
Francesca Clark	4 January 2005 (age 21)	949	583	731
Lauren Azzopardi	24 October 2003 (age 22)	1096	583	1160
Elenia Haber	5 May 2003 (age 23)	1129	754	1356
Ann Marie Bezzina	8 October 1999 (age 26)	1129	754	1160
