= Badminton at the 2014 Commonwealth Games – Mixed team =

Badminton – Mixed team at the 2014 Commonwealth Games
- Venue: Emirates Arena, Glasgow
- Dates: 24–28 July 2014
- Competitors: 164 from 23 nations

Medalists
gold medal	Malaysia
silver medal	England
bronze medal	Singapore

The mixed team badminton event at the 2014 Commonwealth Games was held from July 24 to July 28 at the Emirates Arena in Glasgow.

The teams were drawn into group stage draw. The top team in each group along with the two best runners-up advanced to the knockout round. The draw for the competition was done on July 21, 2014.

This was Malaysia's third consecutive gold medal in the mixed team event at the Commonwealth Games. England took silver for the second time and Singapore took bronze, their first medal ever in the mixed team event.

== Seedings ==
The seeding list was based on July 3, 2014 world rankings as the draw was conducted on July 21, 2014.

The knock out draw was held immediately after the group stage was completed.

1. Malaysia
2. England
3. India
4. Singapore
5. Scotland
6. New Zealand
7. Australia
8. Canada
9. Wales
10. South Africa
11. Mauritius
12. Northern Ireland
13. Sri Lanka
14. Uganda
15. Ghana
16. Jamaica
17. Barbados
18. Kenya
19. Seychelles
20. Falkland Islands
21. Guernsey
22. Norfolk Island
23. Jersey

== Group stage ==
=== Pool A ===
Pos	Team	Pld	W	L	GF	GA	GD	PF	PA	PD	Pts	Qualification
1	Malaysia	2	2	0	20	0	+20	420	202	+218	2	Quarterfinals
2	Sri Lanka	2	1	1	10	10	0	342	292	+50	1	Quarterfinals
3	Barbados	2	0	2	0	20	−20	152	420	−268	0	

Source: glasgow2014.com

Malaysia
5
Commonwealth Arena, Glasgow
24 July

Barbados
0

			1	2	3
1	(Malaysia) (Barbados)	Chan Peng Soon / Lai Pei Jing; Andre Padmore / Shari Watson	21; 11	21; 6
2	(Malaysia) (Barbados)	Chong Wei Feng; Dakeil Thorpe	21; 6	21; 7
3	(Malaysia) (Barbados)	Tee Jing Yi; Mariama Eastmond	21; 8	21; 3
4	(Malaysia) (Barbados)	Tan Wee Kiong / Goh V Shem; Dakeil Thorpe / Andre Padmore	21; 6	21; 8
5	(Malaysia) (Barbados)	Woon Khe Wei / Vivian Hoo; Mariama Eastmond / Shari Watson	21; 8	21; 7

Sri Lanka
5
Commonwealth Arena, Glasgow
25 July

Barbados
0

			1	2	3
1	(Sri Lanka) (Barbados)	Niluka Karunaratne / Thilini Hendahewa; Shari Watson / Dakeil Thorpe	21; 9	21; 4
2	(Sri Lanka) (Barbados)	Dinuka Karunaratne; Andre Padmore	21; 8	21; 7
3	(Sri Lanka) (Barbados)	Thilini Hendahewa; Mariama Eastmond	21; 11	21; 9
4	(Sri Lanka) (Barbados)	Niluka Karunaratne / Dinuka Karunaratne; Mariama Eastmond / Dakeil Thorpe	21; 5	21; 7
5	(Sri Lanka) (Barbados)	Achini Rathnasiri / Upuli Weerasinghe; Mariama Eastmond / Shari Watson	21; 12	21; 10

Malaysia
5
Commonwealth Arena, Glasgow
26 July

Sri Lanka
0

			1	2	3
1	(Malaysia) (Sri Lanka)	Liew Daren; Niluka Karunaratne	21; 17	21; 12
2	(Malaysia) (Sri Lanka)	Tee Jing Yi; Thilini Hendahewa	21; 14	21; 6
3	(Malaysia) (Sri Lanka)	Tan Wee Kiong / Goh V Shem; Niluka Karunaratne / Dinuka Karunaratna	21; 17	21; 19
4	(Malaysia) (Sri Lanka)	Lim Yin Loo / Vivian Hoon; Achini Rathnasiri / Upuli Weerasinghe	21; 11	21; 8
5	(Malaysia) (Sri Lanka)	Chan Peng Soon / Lai Pei Jing; Dinuka Karunaratna / Thilini Hendahewa	21; 14	21; 14

=== Pool B ===
Pos	Team	Pld	W	L	GF	GA	GD	PF	PA	PD	Pts	Qualification
1	India	3	3	0	30	0	+30	630	195	+435	3	Quarterfinals
2	Ghana	3	2	1	12	19	−7	457	586	−129	2	
3	Uganda	3	1	2	11	21	−10	473	593	−120	1	
4	Kenya	3	0	3	9	22	−13	414	600	−186	0	

Source: glasgow2014.com

India
5
Commonwealth Arena, Glasgow
24 July

Ghana
0

			1	2	3
1	(India) (Ghana)	Kashyap Parupalli; Daniel Sam	21; 6	21; 16
2	(India) (Ghana)	P. V. Sindhu; Stella Amasha	21; 7	21; 5
3	(India) (Ghana)	Akshay Dewalkar / Pranav Chopra; Emmanuel Donkor / Abraham Ayittey	21; 7	21; 11
4	(India) (Ghana)	Jwala Gutta / Ashwini Ponnappa; Diana Archer / Evelyn Botwe	21; 4	21; 10
5	(India) (Ghana)	Srikanth Kidambi / P. C. Thulasi; Daniel Sam / Stella Amasha	21; 5	21; 9

Kenya
2
Commonwealth Arena, Glasgow
24 July

Uganda
3

			1	2	3
1	(Kenya) (Uganda)	Lavina Sabastian Martins / Joseph Matheri Githitu; Wilson Tukire / Margaret Nankabirwa	21; 19	14; 21	13; 21
2	(Kenya) (Uganda)	Victor Odera Munga; Edwin Ekiring	17; 21	7; 21
3	(Kenya) (Uganda)	Mercy Mwethya Joseph; Daisy Nakalyango	21; 14	21; 15
4	(Kenya) (Uganda)	Patrick Kinyua Mbogo / Joseph Matheri Githitu; Edwin Ekiring / Wilson Tukire	17; 21	13; 21
5	(Kenya) (Uganda)	Mercy Mwethya Joseph / Lavina Sabastian Martins; Daisy Nakalyango / Margaret Nankabirwa	21; 19	21; 17

India
5
Commonwealth Arena, Glasgow
24 July

Uganda
0

			1	2	3
1	(India) (Uganda)	R. M. V. Gurusaidutt / P. V. Sindhu; Wilson Tukire / Daisy Nakalyango	21; 4	21; 6
2	(India) (Uganda)	Srikanth Kidambi; Edwin Ekiring	21; 10	21; 8
3	(India) (Uganda)	P. C. Thulasi; Margaret Nankabirwa	21; 3	21; 1
4	(India) (Uganda)	Akshay Dewalkar / Pranav Chopra; Edwin Ekiring / Wilson Tukire	21; 6	21; 8
5	(India) (Uganda)	Jwala Gutta / Ashwini Ponnappa; Margaret Nankabirwa / Daisy Nakalyango	21; 4	21; 8

Kenya
2
Commonwealth Arena, Glasgow
24 July

Ghana
3

			1	2	3
1	(Kenya) (Ghana)	Victor Odera Munga / Lavina Sabastian Martins; Daniel Sam / Stella Amasah	17; 21	15; 21
2	(Kenya) (Ghana)	Joseph Matheri Githitu; Emmanuel Donkor	12; 21	14; 21
3	(Kenya) (Ghana)	Mercy Mwethya Joseph; Evelyn Botwe	21; 11	21; 10
4	(Kenya) (Ghana)	Patrick Kinyua Mbogo / Victor Odera Munga; Daniel Sam / Emmanuel Donkor	14; 21	15; 21
5	(Kenya) (Ghana)	Mercy Mwethya Joseph / Lavina Sabastian Martins; Stella Amasah / Evelyn Botwe	21; 17	21; 16

India
5
Commonwealth Arena, Glasgow
25 July

Kenya
0

			1	2	3
1	(India) (Kenya)	Srikanth Kidambi / Jwala Gutta; Patrick Kinyua Mbogo / Mercy Joseph	21; 8	21; 8
2	(India) (Kenya)	Parupalli Kashyap; Victor Odera Munga	21; 7	21; 8
3	(India) (Kenya)	P. C. Thulasi; Lavina Martins	21; 4	21; 2
4	(India) (Kenya)	R.M.V. Gurusaidutt / Pranav Chopra; Matheri Joseph Githitu / Patrick Kinyua Mbogo	21; 5	21; 6
5	(India) (Kenya)	P. V. Sindhu / Jwala Gutta; Lavina Martins / Mercy Joseph	21; 4	21; 5

Uganda
2
Commonwealth Arena, Glasgow
25 July

Ghana
3

			1	2	3
1	(Uganda) (Ghana)	Wilson Tukire / Margaret Nankabirwa; Daniel Sam / Stella Amasah	16; 21	12; 21
2	(Uganda) (Ghana)	Edwin Ekiring; Emmanuel Donkor	21; 14	21; 15
3	(Uganda) (Ghana)	Daisy Nakalyango; Evelyn Botwe	21; 8	21; 14
4	(Uganda) (Ghana)	Edwin Ekiring / Wilson Tukire; Daniel Sam / Emmanuel Donkor	17; 21	14; 21
5	(Uganda) (Ghana)	Daisy Nakalyango / Margaret Nankabirwa; Evelyn Botwe / Stella Amasah	21; 15	17; 21	24; 26

=== Pool C ===
Pos	Team	Pld	W	L	GF	GA	GD	PF	PA	PD	Pts	Qualification
1	Scotland	3	3	0	30	0	+30	636	283	+353	3	Quarterfinals
2	New Zealand	3	2	1	20	10	+10	562	408	+154	2	
3	Guernsey	3	1	2	7	26	−19	409	666	−257	1	
4	Seychelles	3	0	3	6	27	−21	410	660	−250	0	

Source: glasgow2014.com

Scotland
5
Commonwealth Arena, Glasgow
24 July

Seychelles
0

			1	2	3
1	(Scotland) (Seychelles)	Martin Campbell / Jillie Cooper; Juliette Ah-Wan / Georgie Cupidon	21; 11	21; 5
2	(Scotland) (Seychelles)	Kieran Merrilees; Kervin Ghislain	21; 2	21; 8
3	(Scotland) (Seychelles)	Rebekka Findlay; Allisen Camille	21; 7	21; 11
4	(Scotland) (Seychelles)	Patrick Machugh / Martin Campbell; Georgie Cupidon / Steve Malcouzanne	21; 10	21; 4
5	(Scotland) (Seychelles)	Imogen Bankier / Caitlin Pringle; Juliette Ah-Wan / Allisen Camille	21; 14	21; 9

New Zealand
5
Commonwealth Arena, Glasgow
24 July

Guernsey
0

			1	2	3
1	(New Zealand) (Guernsey)	Oliver Leydon-Davis / Susannah Leydon-Davis; Daniel Penney / Gayle Lloyd	21; 9	21; 14
2	(New Zealand) (Guernsey)	Joe Wu; Stuart Hardy	21; 6	21; 8
3	(New Zealand) (Guernsey)	Michelle Chan; Elena Johnson	21; 12	21; 9
4	(New Zealand) (Guernsey)	Kevin Dennerly-Minturn / Oliver Leydon-Davis; Stuart Hardy / Daniel Penney	21; 10	21; 12
5	(New Zealand) (Guernsey)	Michelle Chan / Madeleine Stapleton; Elena Johnson / Gayle Lloyd	21; 16	21; 13

Scotland
5
Commonwealth Arena, Glasgow
24 July

Guernsey
0

			1	2	3
1	(Scotland) (Guernsey)	Martin Campbell / Jillie Cooper; Stuart Hardy / Gayle Lloyd	21; 7	21; 7
2	(Scotland) (Guernsey)	Kieran Merrilees; Daniel Penney	21; 7	21; 4
3	(Scotland) (Guernsey)	Kirsty Gilmour; Elena Johnson	21; 4	21; 7
4	(Scotland) (Guernsey)	Robert Blair / Paul van Rietvelde; Daniel Penney / Stuart Hardy	21; 3	21; 7
5	(Scotland) (Guernsey)	Jillie Cooper / Rebekka Findlay; Elena Johnson / Gayle Lloyd	21; 8	21; 7

New Zealand
5
Commonwealth Arena, Glasgow
24 July

Seychelles
0

			1	2	3
1	(New Zealand) (Seychelles)	Oliver Leydon-Davis / Susannah Leydon-Davis; Georgie Cupidon / Juliette Ah-Wan	21; 8	21; 12
2	(New Zealand) (Seychelles)	Joe Wu; Kervin Ghislain	21; 13	21; 7
3	(New Zealand) (Seychelles)	Michelle Chan; Allisen Camille	21; 5	21; 9
4	(New Zealand) (Seychelles)	Kevin Dennerly-Minturn / Oliver Leydon-Davis; Georgie Cupidon / Steve Malcouzanne	21; 9	22; 20
5	(New Zealand) (Seychelles)	Michelle Chan / Madeleine Stapleton; Juliette Ah-Wan / Allisen Camille	21; 0	21; 0

Scotland
5
Commonwealth Arena, Glasgow
25 July

New Zealand
0

			1	2	3
1	(Scotland) (New Zealand)	Robert Blair / Imogen Bankier; Oliver Leydon-Davis / Susannah Leydon-Davis	21; 8	21; 10
2	(Scotland) (New Zealand)	Kieran Merrilees; Joe Wu	21; 13	21; 17
3	(Scotland) (New Zealand)	Kirsty Gilmour; Michelle Chan	21; 15	23; 21
4	(Scotland) (New Zealand)	Robert Blair / Paul van Rietvelde; Kevin Dennerly-Minturn / Oliver Leydon-Davis	23; 21	23; 21
5	(Scotland) (New Zealand)	Imogen Bankier / Kirsty Gilmour; Anna Rankin / Madeleine Stapleton	21; 4	21; 11

Guernsey
3
Commonwealth Arena, Glasgow
25 July

Seychelles
2

			1	2	3
1	(Guernsey) (Seychelles)	Stuart Hardy / Gayle Lloyd; Georgie Cupidon / Juliette Ah-Wan	23; 21	11; 21	11; 21
2	(Guernsey) (Seychelles)	Daniel Penney; Kervin Ghislain	21; 16	22; 24	21; 17
3	(Guernsey) (Seychelles)	Elena Johnson; Allisen Camille	21; 14	21; 13
4	(Guernsey) (Seychelles)	Daniel Penney / Stuart Hardy; Georgie Cupidon / Steve Malcouzanne	16; 21	14; 21
5	(Guernsey) (Seychelles)	Elena Johnson / Gayle Lloyd; Juliette Ah-Wan / Allisen Camille	21; 17	16; 21	21; 19

=== Pool D ===
Pos	Team	Pld	W	L	GF	GA	GD	PF	PA	PD	Pts	Qualification
1	Canada	3	3	0	25	6	+19	626	386	+240	3	Quarterfinals
2	Australia	3	2	1	23	8	+15	596	412	+184	2	Quarterfinals
3	Wales	3	1	2	14	18	−4	556	494	+62	1	
4	Falkland Islands	3	0	3	0	30	−30	144	630	−486	0	

Source: glasgow2014.com

Australia
4
Commonwealth Arena, Glasgow
24 July

Wales
1

			1	2	3
1	(Australia) (Wales)	Ross Smith / Renuga Veeran; Sarah Thomas / Oliver Gwilt	21; 15	21; 12
2	(Australia) (Wales)	Jeff Tho; Daniel Font	16; 21	21; 13	13; 21
3	(Australia) (Wales)	Verdet Kessler; Carissa Turner	22; 20	21; 13
4	(Australia) (Wales)	Ross Smith / Robbin Middleton; Joe Morgan / Nicolas Strange	21; 12	21; 14
5	(Australia) (Wales)	Renuga Veeran / He Tian Tang; Sarah Thomas / Carissa Turner	21; 16	21; 13

Canada
5
Commonwealth Arena, Glasgow
24 July

Falkland Islands
0

			1	2	3
1	(Canada) (Falkland Islands)	Adrian Liu / Derrick Ng; Dominic Jaffray / Christopher Eynon	21; 6	21; 5
2	(Canada) (Falkland Islands)	Michelle Li; Laura Minto	21; 4	21; 2
3	(Canada) (Falkland Islands)	Andrew D'Souza; Douglas Clark	21; 3	21; 7
4	(Canada) (Falkland Islands)	Alex Bruce / Phyllis Chan; Sofia Arkhipkina / Anna Luxton	21; 0	21; 4
5	(Canada) (Falkland Islands)	Toby Ng / Rachel Honderich; Ross Stewart / Laura Minto	21; 7	21; 5

Australia
5
Commonwealth Arena, Glasgow
25 July

Falkland Islands
0

			1	2	3
1	(Australia) (Falkland Islands)	Raymond Tam / Gronya Somerville; Douglas Clark / Anna Luxton	21; 7	21; 7
2	(Australia) (Falkland Islands)	Jeff Tho; Dominic Jaffray	21; 6	21; 2
3	(Australia) (Falkland Islands)	Verdet Kessler; Laura Minto	21; 4	21; 3
4	(Australia) (Falkland Islands)	Raymond Tam / Glenn Warfe; Douglas Clark / Ross Stewart	21; 8	21; 10
5	(Australia) (Falkland Islands)	Gronya Somerville / Jacqueline Guan; Laura Minto / Louise Williams	21; 4	21; 4

Canada
4
Commonwealth Arena, Glasgow
25 July

Wales
1

			1	2	3
1	(Canada) (Wales)	Toby Ng / Alex Bruce; Sarah Thomas / Oliver Gwilt	21; 9	21; 12
2	(Canada) (Wales)	Andrew D'Souza; Daniel Font	21; 17	21; 15
3	(Canada) (Wales)	Michelle Li; Carissa Turner	21; 14	21; 14
4	(Canada) (Wales)	Adrian Liu / Derrick Ng; Joe Morgan / Nicolas Strange	27; 25	21; 14
5	(Canada) (Wales)	Alex Bruce / Phyllis Chan; Sarah Thomas / Carissa Turner	16; 21	21; 14	18; 21

Australia
2
Commonwealth Arena, Glasgow
25 July

Canada
3

			1	2	3
1	(Australia) (Canada)	Ross Smith / Renuga Veeran; Toby Ng / Alex Bruce	21; 11	21; 17
2	(Australia) (Canada)	Jeff Tho; Andrew D'Souza	10; 21	8; 21
3	(Australia) (Canada)	Verdet Kessler; Michelle Li	16; 21	13; 21
4	(Australia) (Canada)	Ross Smith / Robbin Middleton; Adrian Liu / Derrick Ng	21; 11	21; 17
5	(Australia) (Canada)	Renuga Veeran / He Tian Tang; Michelle Li / Rachel Honderich	24; 26	12; 21

Falkland Islands
0
Commonwealth Arena, Glasgow
25 July

Wales
5

			1	2	3
1	(Falkland Islands) (Wales)	Douglas Clark / Anna Luxton; Sarah Thomas / Oliver Gwilt	6; 21	11; 21
2	(Falkland Islands) (Wales)	Ross Stewart; Daniel Font	6; 21	5; 21
3	(Falkland Islands) (Wales)	Sofia Arkhipkina; Carissa Turner	2; 21	1; 21
4	(Falkland Islands) (Wales)	Dominic Jaffray / Christopher Enyon; Joe Morgan / Nicolas Strange	4; 21	5; 21
5	(Falkland Islands) (Wales)	Sofia Arkhipkina / Anna Luxton; Sarah Thomas / Carissa Turner	4; 21	2; 21

=== Pool E ===
Pos	Team	Pld	W	L	GF	GA	GD	PF	PA	PD	Pts	Qualification
1	Singapore	3	3	0	30	1	+29	644	278	+366	3	Quarterfinals
2	South Africa	3	2	1	18	14	+4	551	457	+94	2	
3	Jamaica	3	1	2	15	18	−3	527	510	+17	1	
4	Norfolk Island	3	0	3	0	30	−30	153	630	−477	0	

Source: glasgow2014.com

Singapore
5
Commonwealth Arena, Glasgow
24 July

Jamaica
0

			1	2	3
1	(Singapore) (Jamaica)	Chayut Triyachart / Yao Lei; Garron Palmer / Geordine Henry	21; 8	21; 11
2	(Singapore) (Jamaica)	Derek Wong; Gareth Henry	21; 11	21; 11
3	(Singapore) (Jamaica)	Liang Xiaoyu; Ruth Williams	21; 7	21; 5
4	(Singapore) (Jamaica)	Danny Bawa Chrisnanta / Terry Hee; Gareth Henry / Garron Palmer	21; 14	14; 21	21; 14
5	(Singapore) (Jamaica)	Vanessa Neo / Fu Mingtian; Ruth Williams / Geordine Henry	21; 4	21; 8

Norfolk Island
0
Commonwealth Arena, Glasgow
24 July

South Africa
5

			1	2	3
1	(Norfolk Island) (South Africa)	Jason Quintal / Terry Gray; Andries Malan / Jennifer Fry	3; 21	3; 21
2	(Norfolk Island) (South Africa)	Richard Cribb; Jacob Maliekal	3; 21	2; 21
3	(Norfolk Island) (South Africa)	Joanne Snell; Elme de Villiers	5; 21	4; 21
4	(Norfolk Island) (South Africa)	Jason Quintal / Michael Donohoe; Andries Malan / Willem Viljoen	3; 21	3; 21
5	(Norfolk Island) (South Africa)	Joanne Snell / Terry Gray; Sandra le Grange / Elme de Villiers	10; 21	8; 21

Singapore
5
Commonwealth Arena, Glasgow
25 July

South Africa
0

			1	2	3
1	(Singapore) (South Africa)	Chayut Triyachart / Terry Hee; Andries Malan / Willem Viljoen	21; 12	21; 16
2	(Singapore) (South Africa)	Liang Xiaoyu; Elme de Villiers	21; 9	21; 9
3	(Singapore) (South Africa)	Huang Chao; Jacob Maliekal	21; 11	21; 11
4	(Singapore) (South Africa)	Yao Lei / Shinta Mulia Sari; Sandra le Grange / Elme de Villiers	21; 9	21; 14
5	(Singapore) (South Africa)	Danny Bawa Chrisnanta / Vanessa Neo; Andries Malan / Jennifer Fry	21; 13	21; 12

Norfolk Island
0
Commonwealth Arena, Glasgow
25 July

Jamaica
5

			1	2	3
1	(Norfolk Island) (Jamaica)	Michael Donohoe / Joanne Snell; Garron Palmer / Geordine Henry	4; 21	6; 21
2	(Norfolk Island) (Jamaica)	Richard Cribb; Gareth Henry	7; 21	3; 21
3	(Norfolk Island) (Jamaica)	Terry Gray; Ruth Williams	7; 21	10; 21
4	(Norfolk Island) (Jamaica)	Jason Quintal / Michael Donohoe; Gareth Henry / Garron Palmer	2; 21	5; 21
5	(Norfolk Island) (Jamaica)	Terry Gray / Joanne Snell; Ruth Williams / Gareth Henry	7; 21	10; 21

Singapore
5
Commonwealth Arena, Glasgow
26 July

Norfolk Island
0

			1	2	3
1	(Singapore) (Norfolk Island)	Terry Hee / Fu Mingtian; Michael Donohoe / Joanne Snell	21; 3	21; 10
2	(Singapore) (Norfolk Island)	Derek Wong; Richard Cribb	21; 2	21; 1
3	(Singapore) (Norfolk Island)	Liang Xiaoyu; Terry Gray	21; 5	21; 7
4	(Singapore) (Norfolk Island)	Chayut Triyachart / Danny Bawa Chrisnanta; Richard Cribb / Michael Donohoe	21; 7	21; 3
5	(Singapore) (Norfolk Island)	Shinta Mulia Sari / Yao Lei; Joanne Snell / Terry Gray	21; 7	21; 3

South Africa
3
Commonwealth Arena, Glasgow
26 July

Jamaica
2

			1	2	3
1	(South Africa) (Jamaica)	Andries Malan / Jennifer Fry; Garron Palmer / Geordine Henry	21; 12	14; 21	15; 21
2	(South Africa) (Jamaica)	Prakash Vijayanath; Gareth Henry	16; 21	23; 21	10; 21
3	(South Africa) (Jamaica)	Elme de Villiers; Ruth Williams	21; 12	21; 18
4	(South Africa) (Jamaica)	Willem Viljoen / Andries Malan; Geordine Henry / Garron Palmer	21; 17	21; 16
5	(South Africa) (Jamaica)	Sandra le Grange / Jennifer Fry; Ruth Williams / Geordine Henry	21; 8	21; 15

=== Pool F ===
Pos	Team	Pld	W	L	GF	GA	GD	PF	PA	PD	Pts	Qualification
1	England	3	3	0	30	1	+29	638	305	+333	3	Quarterfinals
2	Jersey	3	2	1	20	12	+8	558	518	+40	2	
3	Northern Ireland	3	1	2	11	23	−12	528	629	−101	1	
4	Mauritius	3	0	3	4	29	−25	412	684	−272	0	

Source: glasgow2014.com

England
5
Commonwealth Arena, Glasgow
24 July

Northern Ireland
0

			1	2	3
1	(England) (Northern Ireland)	Chris Adcock / Gabby Adcock; Ciaran Chambers / Sinead Chambers	21; 8	21; 17
2	(England) (Northern Ireland)	Rajiv Ouseph; Tony Stephenson	21; 5	21; 9
3	(England) (Northern Ireland)	Sarah Walker; Alannah Stephenson	21; 9	8; 21	21; 13
4	(England) (Northern Ireland)	Peter Mills / Chris Langridge; Tony Stephenson / Tony Murphy	21; 11	21; 9
5	(England) (Northern Ireland)	Kate Robertshaw / Heather Olver; Sinead Chambers / Caroline Black	21; 7	21; 10

Mauritius
0
Commonwealth Arena, Glasgow
24 July

Jersey
5

			1	2	3
1	(Mauritius) (Jersey)	Yeldy Louison / Sahir Edoo; Alexander Hutchings / Mariana Agathangelou	10; 21	9; 21
2	(Mauritius) (Jersey)	Julien Paul; Mark Constable	9; 21	10; 21
3	(Mauritius) (Jersey)	Kate Foo Kune; Elizabeth Cann	12; 21	18; 21
4	(Mauritius) (Jersey)	Julien Paul / Aatish Lubah; Mark Constable / Alexander Hutchings	19; 21	22; 20	18; 21
5	(Mauritius) (Jersey)	Kate Foo Kune / Yeldy Louison; Elizabeth Cann / Mariana Agathangelou	10; 21	6; 21

England
5
Commonwealth Arena, Glasgow
25 July

Jersey
0

			1	2	3
1	(England) (Jersey)	Chris Langridge / Heather Olver; Mark Constable / Mariana Agathangelou	21; 7	21; 13
2	(England) (Jersey)	Rajiv Ouseph; Alexander Hutchings	21; 8	21; 8
3	(England) (Jersey)	Sarah Walker; Elizabeth Cann	21; 15	21; 13
4	(England) (Jersey)	Chris Adcock / Andrew Ellis; Mark Constable / Alexander Hutchings	21; 7	21; 12
5	(England) (Jersey)	Lauren Smith / Gabby Adcock; Solen Pasturel / Mariana Agathangelou	21; 8	21; 10

Mauritius
1
Commonwealth Arena, Glasgow
25 July

Northern Ireland
4

			1	2	3
1	(Mauritius) (Northern Ireland)	Julien Paul; Tony Stephenson	13; 21	9; 21
2	(Mauritius) (Northern Ireland)	Kate Foo Kune; Alannah Stephenson	19; 21	21; 19	9; 21
3	(Mauritius) (Northern Ireland)	Julien Paul / Aatish Lubah; Tony Stephenson / Tony Murphy	19; 21	16; 21
4	(Mauritius) (Northern Ireland)	Nicki Chan-Lam / Yeldy Louison; Sinead Chambers / Caroline Black	8; 21	16; 21
5	(Mauritius) (Northern Ireland)	Kate Foo Kune / Aatish Lubah; Ciaran Chambers / Sinead Chambers	12; 21	21; 19	21; 17

England
5
Commonwealth Arena, Glasgow
26 July

Mauritius
0

			1	2	3
1	(England) (Mauritius)	Rajiv Ouseph; Julien Paul	21; 10	21; 8
2	(England) (Mauritius)	Sarah Walker; Kate Foo Kune	21; 8	21; 9
3	(England) (Mauritius)	Chris Langridge / Peter Mills; Sahir Edoo / Aatish Lubah	21; 14	21; 9
4	(England) (Mauritius)	Kate Robertshaw / Heather Olver; Nicki Chan-Lam / Yeldy Louison	21; 5	21; 6
5	(England) (Mauritius)	Chris Langridge / Heather Olver; Aatish Lubah / Kate Foo Kune	21; 7	21; 9

Jersey
5
Commonwealth Arena, Glasgow
26 July

Northern Ireland
0

			1	2	3
1	(Jersey) (Northern Ireland)	Alexander Hutchings / Mariana Agathangelou; Ciaran Chambers / Sinead Chambers	21; 14	21; 16
2	(Jersey) (Northern Ireland)	Mark Constable; Tony Stephenson	21; 16	21; 8
3	(Jersey) (Northern Ireland)	Elizabeth Cann; Alannah Stephenson	21; 12	21; 15
4	(Jersey) (Northern Ireland)	Alexander Hutchings / Mark Constable; Ciaran Chambers / Tony Murphy	21; 18	17; 21	21; 18
5	(Jersey) (Northern Ireland)	Elizabeth Cann / Mariana Agathangelou; Sinead Chambers / Caroline Black	21; 9	21; 18

== Knockout stage ==
Quarterfinals
1	Malaysia	3
5	Scotland	1
4	Singapore	3
7	Australia	0
8	Canada	1
3	India	3
13	Sri Lanka	0
2	England	3

Semifinals
1	Malaysia	3
4	Singapore	2
3	India	0
2	England	3

Finals
1	Malaysia	3
2	England	1
Third place
4	Singapore	3
3	India	2

=== Quarterfinals ===
Malaysia
3
Commonwealth Arena, Glasgow
26 July

Scotland
1

			1	2	3
1	(Malaysia) (Scotland)	Chan Peng Soon / Lai Pei Jing; Robert Blair / Imogen Bankier	24; 22	9; 21	11; 21
2	(Malaysia) (Scotland)	Chong Wei Feng; Kieran Merrilees	21; 16	21; 14
3	(Malaysia) (Scotland)	Tee Jing Yi; Kirsty Gilmour	21; 10	21; 15
4	(Malaysia) (Scotland)	Tan Wee Kiong / Goh V Shem; Martin Campbell / Patrick MacHugh	21; 12	21; 15

Singapore
3
Commonwealth Arena, Glasgow
26 July

Australia
0

			1	2	3
1	(Singapore) (Australia)	Danny Bawa Chrisnanta / Vanessa Neo; Ross Smith / Renuga Veeran	21; 15	21; 14
2	(Singapore) (Australia)	Derek Wong; Jeff Tho	21; 7	21; 13
3	(Singapore) (Australia)	Chayut Triyachart / Danny Bawa Chrisnanta; Ross Smith / Robin Middleton	21; 17	21; 19
4	(Singapore) (Australia)	Liang Xiaoyu; Verdet Kessler				not played
5	(Singapore) (Australia)	Shinta Mulia Sari / Yao Lei; Renuga Veeran / Tang Hetian				not played

Canada
1
Commonwealth Arena, Glasgow
26 July

India
3

			1	2	3
1	(Canada) (India)	Toby Ng / Alex Bruce; Srikanth Kidambi / Jwala Gutta	19; 21	21; 17	18; 21
2	(Canada) (India)	Andrew D'Souza; Kashyap Parupalli	11; 21	9; 21
3	(Canada) (India)	Michelle Li; P. V. Sindhu	15; 21	22; 20	21; 17
4	(Canada) (India)	Adrian Liu / Derrick Ng; Pranav Chopra / Akshay Dewalkar	15; 21	21; 19	13; 21

Sri Lanka
0
Commonwealth Arena, Glasgow
26 July

England
3

			1	2	3
1	(Sri Lanka) (England)	Dinuka Karunaratna / Thilini Hendahewa; Chris Adcock / Gabby Adcock	13; 21	10; 21
2	(Sri Lanka) (England)	Niluka Karunaratne; Rajiv Ouseph	15; 21	16; 21
3	(Sri Lanka) (England)	Thilini Hendahewa; Sarah Walker	14; 21	14; 21

=== Semifinals ===
Malaysia
3
Commonwealth Arena, Glasgow
27 July

Singapore
2

			1	2	3
1	(Malaysia) (Singapore)	Goh V Shem / Tan Wee Kiong; Chayut Triyachart / Danny Bawa Chrisnanta	21; 17	18; 21	21; 16
2	(Malaysia) (Singapore)	Chong Wei Feng; Derek Wong	21; 9	21; 18
3	(Malaysia) (Singapore)	Tee Jing Yi; Liang Xiaoyu	12; 21	20; 22
4	(Malaysia) (Singapore)	Vivian Hoo / Woon Khe Wei; Yao Lei / Shinta Mulia Sari	9; 21	18; 21
5	(Malaysia) (Singapore)	Chan Peng Soon / Lai Pei Jing; Danny Bawa Chrisnanta / Vanessa Neo	17; 21	21; 12	21; 14

India
0
Commonwealth Arena, Glasgow
27 July

England
3

			1	2	3
1	(India) (England)	Akshay Dewalkar / Jwala Gutta; Chris Adcock / Gabby Adcock	16; 21	21; 16	11; 21
2	(India) (England)	Kashyap Parupalli; Rajiv Ouseph	16; 21	19; 21
3	(India) (England)	Akshay Dewalkar / Pranav Chopra; Chris Adcock / Andrew Ellis	21; 12	13; 21	16; 21

=== Bronze medal ===
Singapore
3
Commonwealth Arena, Glasgow
28 July

India
2

			1	2	3
1	(Singapore) (India)	Danny Bawa Chrisnanta / Vanessa Neo; R.M.V. Gurusaidutt / Ashwini Ponnappa	21; 19	21; 19
2	(Singapore) (India)	Huang Chao; Kashyap Parupalli	15; 21	20; 22
3	(Singapore) (India)	Danny Bawa Chrisnanta / Chayut Triyachart; Akshay Dewalker & Pranav Chopra	21; 12	21; 16
4	(Singapore) (India)	Liang Xiaoyu; P. V. Sindhu	22; 24	13; 21
5	(Singapore) (India)	Shinta Mulia Sari / Yao Lei; Jwala Gutta / Ashwini Ponnappa	21; 17	29; 27

=== Final ===
Malaysia
3
Commonwealth Arena, Glasgow
28 July

England
1

			1	2	3
1	(Malaysia) (England)	Chan Peng Soon / Lai Pei Jing; Chris Adcock / Gabby Adcock	14; 21	26; 28
2	(Malaysia) (England)	Chong Wei Feng; Rajiv Ouseph	21; 17	19; 21	21; 19
3	(Malaysia) (England)	Goh V Shem / Tan Wee Kiong; Chris Adcock / Andrew Ellis	21; 19	21; 17
4	(Malaysia) (England)	Tee Jing Yi; Sarah Walker	21; 16	21; 17
