= Badminton at the 2014 Commonwealth Games – Mixed doubles =

Badminton – Mixed doubles at the 2014 Commonwealth Games
- Venue: Emirates Arena, Glasgow
- Dates: 29 July – 3 August 2014
- Competitors: 104 from 23 nations

Medalists
gold medal	Chris Adcock; Gabby Adcock	England
silver medal	Chris Langridge; Heather Olver	England
bronze medal	Robert Blair; Imogen Bankier	Scotland

The mixed doubles badminton event at the 2014 Commonwealth Games was held between July 29 and August 3 at the Emirates Arena in Glasgow.

== Seeds ==
The seeds for the tournament were:

1. Chris Adcock (ENG) / Gabby Adcock (ENG) (champions, gold medalists)
2. Danny Bawa Chrisnanta (SIN) / Vanessa Neo (SIN) (quarterfinals)
3. Robert Blair (SCO) / Imogen Bankier (SCO) (semifinals, bronze medalists)
4. Chris Langridge (ENG) / Heather Olver (ENG) (final, silver medalists)
5. Chan Peng Soon (MAS) / Lai Pei Jing (MAS) (semifinals, fourth place)
6. Toby Ng (CAN) / Alex Bruce (CAN) (quarterfinals)
7. Derrick Ng (CAN) / Phyllis Chan (CAN) (quarterfinals)
8. Ross Smith (AUS) / Renuga Veeran (AUS) (round of 32)

== Draw ==
=== Finals ===
Quarterfinals
1	Chris Adcock (ENG); Gabby Adcock (ENG)	21	21
Chayut Triyachart (SIN); Yao Lei (SIN)	13	14
3	Robert Blair (SCO); Imogen Bankier (SCO)	21	21
7	Derrick Ng (CAN); Phyllis Chan (CAN)	11	17
6	Toby Ng (CAN); Alex Bruce (CAN)	16	17
4	Chris Langridge (ENG); Heather Olver (ENG)	21	21
5	Chan Peng Soon (MAS); Lai Pei Jing (MAS)	21	17	21
2	Danny Bawa Chrisnanta (SIN); Vanessa Neo (SIN)	8	21	19

Semifinals
1	Chris Adcock (ENG); Gabby Adcock (ENG)	21	21
3	Robert Blair (SCO); Imogen Bankier (SCO)	14	14
4	Chris Langridge (ENG); Heather Olver (ENG)	21	20	21
5	Chan Peng Soon (MAS); Lai Pei Jing (MAS)	15	22	13

Final
1	Chris Adcock (ENG); Gabby Adcock (ENG)	21	21
4	Chris Langridge (ENG); Heather Olver (ENG)	9	12
Third place
3	Robert Blair (SCO); Imogen Bankier (SCO)	21	21
5	Chan Peng Soon (MAS); Lai Pei Jing (MAS)	17	11

=== Top half ===
==== Section 1 ====
Round of 64
Tony Murphy (NIR); Alannah Stephenson (NIR)	21	16	21
Georgie Cupidon (SEY); Juliette Ah-Wan (SEY)	18	21	16
Dakeil Thorpe (BAR); Mariama Eastmond (BAR)	22	21
Garron Palmer (JAM); Ruth Williams (JAM)	20	16
Sachin Dias (SRI); Upuli Weerasinghe (SRI)	12	15
Chayut Triyachart (SIN); Yao Lei (SIN)	21	21
Dominic Jaffrey (FAI); Louise Williams (FAI)	9	2
Kevin Dennerly-Minturn (NZL); Madeleine Stapleton (NZL)	21	21
Emmanuel Donkor (GHA); Diana Archer (GHA)	21	21
Richard Cribb (NFI); Terry Gray (NFI)	10	11

Round of 32
1	Chris Adcock (ENG); Gabby Adcock (ENG)	21	21
Tony Murphy (NIR); Alannah Stephenson (NIR)	12	13
Tan Wee Kiong (MAS); Vivian Hoo (MAS)	21	21
Dakeil Thorpe (BAR); Mariama Eastmond (BAR)	4	12
8	Ross Smith (AUS); Renuga Veeran (AUS)	21	17	16
Chayut Triyachart (SIN); Yao Lei (SIN)	16	21	21
Kevin Dennerly-Minturn (NZL); Madeleine Stapleton (NZL)	21	21
Emmanuel Donkor (GHA); Diana Archer (GHA)	16	12

Round of 16
1	Chris Adcock (ENG); Gabby Adcock (ENG)	21	21
Tan Wee Kiong (MAS); Vivian Hoo (MAS)	17	11
Chayut Triyachart (SIN); Yao Lei (SIN)	21
Kevin Dennerly-Minturn (NZL); Madeleine Stapleton (NZL)	14	r

Quarterfinals
1	Chris Adcock (ENG); Gabby Adcock (ENG)	21	21
Chayut Triyachart (SIN); Yao Lei (SIN)	13	14

==== Section 2 ====
Round of 64
Goh Wei Shem (MAS); Lim Yin Loo (MAS)	21	21
Daniel Penney (GUE); Elena Johnson (GUE)	5	8
Benjamin Pui Hun Li (IOM); Cristen Elizabeth Marritt (IOM)	8	11
Terry Hee (SIN); Fu Mingtian (SIN)	21	21
Hussein Zaki (MDV); Maisa Ismali (MDV)	7	8
Ciaran Chambers (NIR); Sinead Chambers (NIR)	21	21
Andries Malan (RSA); Jennifer Fry (RSA)	21	21
Matheri Joseph Githitu (KEN); Lavina Martins (KEN)	14	5
Daniel Sam (GHA); Stella Amasah (GHA)	21	21
Douglas Clark (FAI); Anna Luxton (FAI)	16	12

Round of 32
3	Robert Blair (SCO); Imogen Bankier (SCO)	15	21	21
Goh Wei Shem (MAS); Lim Yin Loo (MAS)	21	14	14
Sahir Edoo (MRI); Yeldy Louison (MRI)	9	9
Terry Hee (SIN); Fu Mingtian (SIN)	21	21
7	Derrick Ng (CAN); Phyllis Chan (CAN)	21	21
Ciaran Chambers (NIR); Sinead Chambers (NIR)	13	12
Andries Malan (RSA); Jennifer Fry (RSA)	21	21
Daniel Sam (GHA); Stella Amasah (GHA)	6	16

Round of 16
3	Robert Blair (SCO); Imogen Bankier (SCO)	21	21
Terry Hee (SIN); Fu Mingtian (SIN)	19	11
7	Derrick Ng (CAN); Phyllis Chan (CAN)	21	21
Andries Malan (RSA); Jennifer Fry (RSA)	7	9

Quarterfinals
3	Robert Blair (SCO); Imogen Bankier (SCO)	21	21
7	Derrick Ng (CAN); Phyllis Chan (CAN)	11	17

=== Bottom half ===
==== Section 3 ====
Round of 64
Tony Stephenson (NIR); Caroline Black (NIR)	21	21
Aatish Lubah (MRI); Nicki Chan-Lam (MRI)	11	11
Gareth Henry (JAM); Geordine Henry (JAM)	21	21
Steve Malcouzanne (SEY); Allisen Camille (SEY)	19	18
Andre Padmore (BAR); Shari Watson (BAR)	21	21
Stuart Hardy (GUE); Gayle Lloyd (GUE)	16	18
Jeff Tho (AUS); Jacqueline Guan (AUS)	21	21
Mohamed Ajfan Rasheed (MDV); Afnaan Rasheed (MDV)	16	6
Patrick Kinyua Mbogo (KEN); Mercy Mwethya Joseph (KEN)	21	21
Michael Donohue (NFI); Joanne Snell (NFI)	4	5

Round of 32
Tony Stephenson (NIR); Caroline Black (NIR)	21	21
Gareth Henry (JAM); Geordine Henry (JAM)	19	16
Andre Padmore (BAR); Shari Watson (BAR)	13	10
6	Toby Ng (CAN); Alex Bruce (CAN)	21	21
Jeff Tho (AUS); Jacqueline Guan (AUS)	21	21
Ross Stewart (FAI); Laura Minto (FAI)	7	4
Patrick Kinyua Mbogo (KEN); Mercy Mwethya Joseph (KEN)	7	4
4	Chris Langridge (ENG); Heather Olver (ENG)	21	21

Round of 16
Tony Stephenson (NIR); Caroline Black (NIR)	17	13
6	Toby Ng (CAN); Alex Bruce (CAN)	21	21
Jeff Tho (AUS); Jacqueline Guan (AUS)	7	10
4	Chris Langridge (ENG); Heather Olver (ENG)	21	21

Quarterfinals
6	Toby Ng (CAN); Alex Bruce (CAN)	16	17
4	Chris Langridge (ENG); Heather Olver (ENG)	21	21

==== Section 4 ====
Round of 64
Buwaneka Goonethilleka (SRI); Madushika Beruwalage (SRI)	21	21
Wilson Tukire (UGA); Margaret Nankabirwa (UGA)	10	6
Christoper Eynon (FAI); Sofia Arkhipkina (FAI)	7	5
M. Irfan Saeed Bhatti (PAK); Palwasha Bashir (PAK)	21	21
Oliver Leydon-Davis (NZL); Susannah Leydon-Davis (NZL)	16	21	21
Oliver Gwilt (WAL); Sarah Thomas (WAL)	21	13	10
Julien Paul (MRI); Kate Foo Kune (MRI)	13	17
Raymond Tam (AUS); Gronya Somerville (AUS)	21	21
Adrian Liu (CAN); Michelle Li (CAN)	21	24
Paul van Rietvelde (SCO); Jillie Cooper (SCO)	13	22

Round of 32
Buwaneka Goonethilleka (SRI); Madushika Beruwalage (SRI)	22	17	21
M. Irfan Saeed Bhatti (PAK); Palwasha Bashir (PAK)	20	21	15
Oliver Leydon-Davis (NZL); Susannah Leydon-Davis (NZL)	11	21	13
5	Chan Peng Soon (MAS); Lai Pei Jing (MAS)	21	18	21
Raymond Tam (AUS); Gronya Somerville (AUS)	21	21
Abraham Ayittey (GHA); Evelyn Botwe (GHA)	12	6
Adrian Liu (CAN); Michelle Li (CAN)	13	8
2	Danny Bawa Chrisnanta (SIN); Vanessa Neo (SIN)	21	21

Round of 16
Buwaneka Goonethilleka (SRI); Madushika Beruwalage (SRI)	13	15
5	Chan Peng Soon (MAS); Lai Pei Jing (MAS)	21	21
Raymond Tam (AUS); Gronya Somerville (AUS)	9	10
2	Danny Bawa Chrisnanta (SIN); Vanessa Neo (SIN)	21	21

Quarterfinals
5	Chan Peng Soon (MAS); Lai Pei Jing (MAS)	21	17	21
2	Danny Bawa Chrisnanta (SIN); Vanessa Neo (SIN)	8	21	19
