= Northern Ireland national badminton team =

Northern Ireland
- Association: Ulster Badminton

The Northern Ireland national badminton team represents Northern Ireland in international badminton team competitions. It is controlled by Ulster Badminton, the governing body for badminton in Northern Ireland. Ulster Badminton is a provincial member of Badminton Ireland and also governs the sport in the counties of Cavan, Donegal and Monaghan. As Northern Irish players represent the Ireland national badminton team in international events, they can only represent Northern Ireland in Commonwealth Games.

== Participation in Commonwealth Games ==
Mixed team

| Year | Result |
|---|---|
| 2010 | Group stage |
| 2014 | Group stage |

== Players ==
=== Current squad ===
As of 2 January 2024

==== Men's team ====
| Name | DoB/Age | Ranking of event | | |
| Name | DoB/Age | MS | MD | XD |
|---|---|---|---|---|
| Ciaran Chambers | 4 February 1994 (age 32) | - | - | - |
| Tony Stephenson | 10 February 1991 (age 35) | - | - | - |
| Tony Murphy | 24 July 1990 (age 35) | - | - | - |

==== Women's team ====
| Name | DoB/Age | Ranking of event | | |
| Name | DoB/Age | WS | WD | XD |
|---|---|---|---|---|
| Sinead Chambers | 1 February 1992 (age 34) | - | - | - |
| Alannah Stephenson | 4 December 1996 (age 29) | - | - | - |
| Caroline Black | 4 March 1994 (age 32) | - | - | - |
| Rachael Darragh | 24 September 1997 (age 28) | - | - | - |
