= Badminton at the 2018 Commonwealth Games – Mixed team =

Badminton – Mixed team at the 2018 Commonwealth Games
- Venue: Carrara Sports and Leisure Centre, Gold Coast
- Dates: 5–9 April
- Nations: 16

Medalists
gold medal	India
silver medal	Malaysia
bronze medal	England

The mixed team badminton event at the 2018 Commonwealth Games was held from 5 to 9 April at the Carrara Sports and Leisure Centre on the Gold Coast, Australia.

The teams were drawn into four groups of four teams. The top two teams in each group advanced to the knockout stage. Each tie was player over five matches, one each for men's and women's singles, and men's, women's and mixed doubles. The draw for the group stage was conducted on 6 February 2018.

== Group stage ==
=== Pool A ===
Pos	Team	Pld	W	L	MF	MA	MD	GF	GA	GD	PF	PA	PD	Pts	Qualification
1	India	3	3	0	15	0	+15	30	1	+29	651	401	+250	3	Knockout stage
2	Scotland	3	2	1	9	6	+3	19	13	+6	592	476	+116	2	Knockout stage
3	Sri Lanka	3	1	2	5	10	−5	12	21	−9	526	619	−93	1	
4	Pakistan	3	0	3	1	14	−13	2	28	−26	348	621	−273	0	

Source: GC2018

India
5
Carrara Sports and Leisure Centre, Gold Coast
5 April

Sri Lanka
0

			1	2	3
1	(India) (Sri Lanka)	Pranav Chopra / Gadde Ruthvika Shivani; Sachin Dias / Thilini Hendahewa	21; 15	19; 21	22; 20
2	(India) (Sri Lanka)	Srikanth Kidambi; Niluka Karunaratne	21; 16	21; 10
3	(India) (Sri Lanka)	Satwiksairaj Rankireddy / Chirag Shetty; Dinuka Karunaratna / Buwaneka Goonethilleka	21; 17	21; 14
4	(India) (Sri Lanka)	Saina Nehwal; Madushika Beruwelage	21; 8	21; 4
5	(India) (Sri Lanka)	Ashwini Ponnappa / N. Sikki Reddy; Thilini Hendahewa / Kavidi Sirimannage	21; 12	21; 14

Scotland
5
Carrara Sports and Leisure Centre, Gold Coast
5 April

Pakistan
0

			1	2	3
1	(Scotland) (Pakistan)	Alexander Dunn / Eleanor O'Donnell; Murad Ali / Palwasha Bashir	21; 12	21; 13
2	(Scotland) (Pakistan)	Kieran Merrilees; Muhammad Irfan Bhatti	21; 6	21; 16
3	(Scotland) (Pakistan)	Kirsty Gilmour; Mahoor Shahzad	21; 6	21; 10
4	(Scotland) (Pakistan)	Martin Campbell / Patrick MacHugh; Murad Ali / Muhammad Irfan Bhatti	21; 8	21; 10
5	(Scotland) (Pakistan)	Julie MacPherson / Eleanor O'Donnell; Mahoor Shahzad / Palwasha Bashir	21; 6	21; 4

India
5
Carrara Sports and Leisure Centre, Gold Coast
5 April

Pakistan
0

			1	2	3
1	(India) (Pakistan)	Satwiksairaj Rankireddy / N. Sikki Reddy; Muhammad Irfan Saeed Bhatti / Palwasha Bashir	21; 10	21; 13
2	(India) (Pakistan)	Srikanth Kidambi; Murad Ali	21; 16	22; 20
3	(India) (Pakistan)	Saina Nehwal; Mahoor Shahzad	21; 7	21; 11
4	(India) (Pakistan)	Pranaav Jerry Chopra / Chirag Shetty; Muhammad Irfan Saeed Bhatti / Murad Ali	21; 9	21; 15
5	(India) (Pakistan)	Ashwini Ponnappa / Gadde Ruthvika Shivani; Mahoor Shahzad / Palwasha Bashir	21; 6	21; 10

Scotland
4
Carrara Sports and Leisure Centre, Gold Coast
5 April

Sri Lanka
1

			1	2	3
1	(Scotland) (Sri Lanka)	Alexander Dunn / Eleanor O'Donnell; Sachin Dias / Thilini Hendahewa	17; 21	21; 16	25; 27
2	(Scotland) (Sri Lanka)	Kieran Merrilees; Niluka Karunaratne	21; 14	21; 17
3	(Scotland) (Sri Lanka)	Kirsty Gilmour; Hasini Ambalangodage	21; 4	21; 5
4	(Scotland) (Sri Lanka)	Alexander Dunn / Adam Hall; Niluka Karunaratne / Buwaneka Goonethilleka	21; 16	21; 16
5	(Scotland) (Sri Lanka)	Kirsty Gilmour / Julie MacPherson; Thilini Hendahewa / Kavidi Sirimannage	18; 21	21; 9	21; 9

India
5
Carrara Sports and Leisure Centre, Gold Coast
6 April

Scotland
0

			1	2	3
1	(India) (Scotland)	Saina Nehwal; Julie MacPherson	21; 14	21; 12
2	(India) (Scotland)	Srikanth Kidambi; Kieran Merrilees	21; 18	21; 2
3	(India) (Scotland)	N. Sikki Reddy / Ashwini Ponnappa; Kirsty Gilmour / Eleanor O'Donnell	21; 8	21; 12
4	(India) (Scotland)	Satwiksairaj Rankireddy / Chirag Shetty; Patrick MacHugh / Adam Hall	21; 16	21; 19
5	(India) (Scotland)	Pranaav Jerry Chopra / N. Sikki Reddy; Martin Campbell / Julie MacPherson	21; 17	21; 15

Pakistan
1
Carrara Sports and Leisure Centre, Gold Coast
6 April

Sri Lanka
4

			1	2	3
1	(Pakistan) (Sri Lanka)	Irfan Saeed Bhatti / Palwasha Bashir; Buwaneka Goonethilleka / Kavidi Sirimannage	16; 21	4; 21
2	(Pakistan) (Sri Lanka)	Murad Ali; Dinuka Karunaratne	18; 21	17; 21
3	(Pakistan) (Sri Lanka)	Mahoor Shahzad; Madushika Dilrukshi	21; 14	21; 18
4	(Pakistan) (Sri Lanka)	Murad Ali / Irfan Saeed Bhatti; Buwaneka Goonethilleka / Sachin Dias	11; 21	14; 21
5	(Pakistan) (Sri Lanka)	Mahoor Shahzad / Palwasha Bashir; Thilini Hendahewa / Kavidi Sirimannage	7; 21	11; 21

=== Pool B ===
Pos	Team	Pld	W	L	MF	MA	MD	GF	GA	GD	PF	PA	PD	Pts	Qualification
1	Singapore	3	3	0	15	0	+15	30	0	+30	630	308	+322	3	Knockout stage
2	Mauritius	3	2	1	10	5	+5	20	13	+7	603	542	+61	2	Knockout stage
3	Jamaica	3	1	2	5	10	−5	13	23	−10	540	675	−135	1	
4	Zambia	3	0	3	0	15	−15	3	30	−27	435	683	−248	0	

Source: GC2018

Singapore
5
Carrara Sports and Leisure Centre, Gold Coast
5 April

Jamaica
0

			1	2	3
1	(Singapore) (Jamaica)	Terry Hee / Crystal Wong; Dennis Coke / Katherine Wynter	21; 9	21; 9
2	(Singapore) (Jamaica)	Ryan Ng; Samuel Ricketts	21; 16	21; 10
3	(Singapore) (Jamaica)	Grace Chua; Alana Bailey	21; 4	21; 6
4	(Singapore) (Jamaica)	Jason Wong / Danny Bawa Chrisnanta; Dennis Coke / Anthony McNee	21; 16	21; 12
5	(Singapore) (Jamaica)	Ren-ne Ong / Crystal Wong; Alana Bailey / Katherine Wynter	21; 3	21; 6

Mauritius
5
Carrara Sports and Leisure Centre, Gold Coast
5 April

Zambia
0

			1	2	3
1	(Mauritius) (Zambia)	Julien Paul; Kalombo Mulenga	21; 19	22; 20
2	(Mauritius) (Zambia)	Kate Foo Kune; Ogar Siamupangila	21; 15	21; 8
3	(Mauritius) (Zambia)	Aatish Lubah / Christopher Jean Paul; Kalombo Mulenga / Chongo Mulenga	21; 10	21; 15
4	(Mauritius) (Zambia)	Kate Foo Kune / Aurélie Allet; Ogar Siamupangila / Evelyn Siamupangila	21; 15	21; 18
5	(Mauritius) (Zambia)	Julien Paul / Aurélie Allet; Chongo Mulenga / Evelyn Siamupangila	21; 9	21; 16

Singapore
5
Carrara Sports and Leisure Centre, Gold Coast
5 April

Zambia
0

			1	2	3
1	(Singapore) (Zambia)	Jason Wong / Ren-ne Ong; Kalombo Mulenga / Ogar Siamupangila	21; 10	21; 10
2	(Singapore) (Zambia)	Ryan Ng; Chongo Mulenga	21; 14	21; 11
3	(Singapore) (Zambia)	Grace Chua; Evelyn Siamupangila	21; 3	21; 2
4	(Singapore) (Zambia)	Tery Hee / Danny Bawa Chrisnanta; Kalombo Mulenga / Chongo Mulenga	21; 4	21; 18
5	(Singapore) (Zambia)	Ren-ne Ong / Crystal Wong; Ogar Siamupangila / Evelyn Siamupangila	21; 7	21; 9

Mauritius
5
Carrara Sports and Leisure Centre, Gold Coast
5 April

Jamaica
0

			1	2	3
1	(Mauritius) (Jamaica)	Julien Paul; Samuel Ricketts	18; 21	21; 17	21; 14
2	(Mauritius) (Jamaica)	Kate Foo Kune; Alana Bailey	21; 7	21; 6
3	(Mauritius) (Jamaica)	Julien Paul / Aurélie Allet; Anthony McNee / Katherine Wynter	21; 19	18; 21	21; 13
4	(Mauritius) (Jamaica)	Kate Foo Kune / Nicki Chan-Lam; Alana Bailey / Katherine Wynter	17; 21	21; 14	21; 5
5	(Mauritius) (Jamaica)	Aatish Lubah / Christopher Jean Paul; Anthony McNee / Dennis Coke	21; 14	21; 15

Singapore
5
Carrara Sports and Leisure Centre, Gold Coast
6 April

Mauritius
0

			1	2	3
1	(Singapore) (Mauritius)	Terry Hee / Danny Bawa Chrisnanta; Aatish Lubah / Christopher Jean Paul	21; 13	21; 11
2	(Singapore) (Mauritius)	Yeo Jia Min; Kate Foo Kune	21; 15	21; 16
3	(Singapore) (Mauritius)	Loh Kean Yew; Julien Paul	21; 14	21; 15
4	(Singapore) (Mauritius)	Ren-ne Ong / Crystal Wong; Kate Foo Kune / Aurélie Allet	21; 9	21; 12
5	(Singapore) (Mauritius)	Terry Hee / Tan Wei Han; Aatish Lubah / Nicki Chan-Lam	21; 10	21; 14

Zambia
0
Carrara Sports and Leisure Centre, Gold Coast
6 April

Jamaica
5

			1	2	3
1	(Zambia) (Jamaica)	Chongo Mulenga / Evelyn Siamupangila; Anthony McNee / Alana Bailey	21; 14	9; 21	9; 21
2	(Zambia) (Jamaica)	Kalombo Mulenga; Samuel Ricketts	12; 21	9; 21
3	(Zambia) (Jamaica)	Ogar Siamupangila; Katherine Wynter	22; 20	20; 22	15; 21
4	(Zambia) (Jamaica)	Kalombo Mulenga / Chongo Mulenga; Anthony McNee / Dennis Coke	9; 21	21; 23
5	(Zambia) (Jamaica)	Ogar Siamupangila / Evelyn Siamupangila; Alana Bailey / Katherine Wynter	15; 21	21; 15	19; 21

=== Pool C ===
Pos	Team	Pld	W	L	MF	MA	MD	GF	GA	GD	PF	PA	PD	Pts	Qualification
1	England	3	3	0	15	0	+15	30	0	+30	630	345	+285	3	Knockout stage
2	Australia	3	2	1	9	6	+3	19	12	+7	576	472	+104	2	Knockout stage
3	South Africa	3	1	2	3	12	−9	6	24	−18	410	592	−182	1	
4	Uganda	3	0	3	3	12	−9	6	25	−19	406	613	−207	0	

Updated to match(es) played on 6 April 2018. Source: GC2018

England
5
Carrara Sports and Leisure Centre, Gold Coast
5 April

Uganda
0

			1	2	3
1	(England) (Uganda)	Chris Adcock / Gabby Adcock; Brian Kasirye / Aisha Nakiyemba	21; 5	21; 9
2	(England) (Uganda)	Rajiv Ouseph; Edwin Ekiring	21; 11	21; 15
3	(England) (Uganda)	Chloe Birch; Shamim Bangi	21; 12	21; 10
4	(England) (Uganda)	Chris Langridge / Marcus Ellis; Brian Kasirye / Edwin Ekiring	21; 9	21; 5
5	(England) (Uganda)	Jessica Pugh / Chloe Birch; Aisha Nakiyemba / Shamim Bangi	21; 12	21; 12

Australia
5
Carrara Sports and Leisure Centre, Gold Coast
5 April

South Africa
0

			1	2	3
1	(Australia) (South Africa)	Anthony Joe; Prakash Vijayanath	24; 22	22; 20
2	(Australia) (South Africa)	Wendy Chen Hsuan-yu; Johanita Scholtz	21; 5	21; 13
3	(Australia) (South Africa)	Sawan Serasinghe / Matthew Chau; Cameron Coetzer / Bongani von Bodenstein	21; 8	21; 12
4	(Australia) (South Africa)	Setyana Mapasa / Gronya Somerville; Michelle Butler-Emmett / Elsie de Villers	21; 6	21; 13
5	(Australia) (South Africa)	Sawan Serasinghe / Setyana Mapasa; Prakash Vijayanath / Michelle Butler-Emmett	21; 8	21; 17

England
5
Carrara Sports and Leisure Centre, Gold Coast
6 April

South Africa
0

			1	2	3
1	(England) (South Africa)	Ben Lane / Jessica Pugh; Prakash Vijayanath / Michelle Butler-Emmett	21; 12	21; 15
2	(England) (South Africa)	Rajiv Ouseph; Bongani von Bodenstein	21; 7	21; 7
3	(England) (South Africa)	Chloe Birch; Johanita Scholtz	21; 10	21; 10
4	(England) (South Africa)	Chris Adcock / Ben Lane; Cameron Coetzer / Bongani von Bodenstein	21; 7	21; 6
5	(England) (South Africa)	Sarah Walker / Lauren Smith; Michelle Butler-Emmett / Elsie de Velliers	21; 12	21; 17

Australia
4
Carrara Sports and Leisure Centre, Gold Coast
6 April

Uganda
1

			1	2	3
1	(Australia) (Uganda)	Ross Smith / Leanne Choo; Brian Kasirye / Aisha Nakiyemba	21; 13	21; 15
2	(Australia) (Uganda)	Anthony Joe; Edwin Ekiring	21; 23	21; 19	10; 21
3	(Australia) (Uganda)	Wendy Chen Hsuan-yu; Shamim Bangi	21; 5	21; 12
4	(Australia) (Uganda)	Robin Middleton / Ross Smith; Edwin Ekiring / Brian Kasirye	21; 12	21; 6
5	(Australia) (Uganda)	Leanne Choo / Renuga Veeran; Shamim Bangi / Aisha Nakiyemba	21; 7	21; 5

England
5
Carrara Sports and Leisure Centre, Gold Coast
6 April

Australia
0

			1	2	3
1	(England) (Australia)	Chris Adcock / Gabby Adcock; Sawan Serasinghe / Setyana Mapasa	21; 15	21; 15
2	(England) (Australia)	Rajiv Ouseph; Anthony Joe	21; 13	21; 11
3	(England) (Australia)	Marcus Ellis / Chris Langridge; Sawan Serasinghe / Matthew Chau	21; 14	21; 8
4	(England) (Australia)	Chloe Birch; Chen Hsuan-yu	21; 15	21; 15
5	(England) (Australia)	Lauren Smith / Sarah Walker; Setyana Mapasa / Gronya Somerville	21; 17	21; 19

South Africa
3
Carrara Sports and Leisure Centre, Gold Coast
6 April

Uganda
2

			1	2	3
1	(South Africa) (Uganda)	Prakash Vijayanath / Michelle Butler-Emmett; Brian Kasirye / Aisha Nakiyemba	21; 16	21; 15
2	(South Africa) (Uganda)	Bongani von Bodenstein; Edwin Ekiring	13; 21	11; 21
3	(South Africa) (Uganda)	Johanita Scholtz; Shamim Bangi	13; 21	20; 22
4	(South Africa) (Uganda)	Prakash Vijayanath / Cameron Coetzer; Edwin Ekiring / Brian Kasirye	21; 16	21; 16
5	(South Africa) (Uganda)	Michelle Butler-Emmett / Elsie de Villiers; Aisha Nakiyemba / Shamim Bangi	21; 10	21; 10

=== Pool D ===
Pos	Team	Pld	W	L	MF	MA	MD	GF	GA	GD	PF	PA	PD	Pts	Qualification
1	Malaysia	2	2	0	9	1	+8	19	2	+17	433	202	+231	2	Knockout stage
2	Canada	2	1	1	6	4	+2	12	9	+3	358	328	+30	1	Knockout stage
3	Ghana	2	0	2	0	10	−10	0	20	−20	159	420	−261	0	
4	Seychelles DSQ	0	0	0	0	0	0	0	0	0	0	0	0	0	

Updated to match(es) played on 6 April 2018. Source:

Malaysia
5
Carrara Sports and Leisure Centre, Gold Coast
5 April

Ghana
0

			1	2	3
1	(Malaysia) (Ghana)	Goh V Shem / Tan Wee Kiong; Abraham Ayittey / Micheal Opoku Baah	21; 8	21; 11
2	(Malaysia) (Ghana)	Soniia Cheah; Stella Koteikai Amasah	21; 3	21; 5
3	(Malaysia) (Ghana)	Lee Chong Wei; Daniel Sam	21; 2	21; 7
4	(Malaysia) (Ghana)	Vivian Hoo / Chow Mei Kuan; Grace Atipaka / Eyram Migbodzi	21; 2	21; 3
5	(Malaysia) (Ghana)	Chan Peng Soon / Goh Liu Ying; Emmanuel Donkor / Gifty Mensah	21; 7	21; 6

Canada
5
Carrara Sports and Leisure Centre, Gold Coast
5 April

Seychelles
0

			1	2	3
1	(Canada) (Seychelles)	Jason Ho-Shue; Kervin Ghislain	21; 7	21; 6
2	(Canada) (Seychelles)	Michelle Li; Allisen Camille	21; 3	21; 5
3	(Canada) (Seychelles)	Brian Yang / Ty Alexander Lindeman; Kervin Ghislain / Steve Malcouzane	21; 18	21; 9
4	(Canada) (Seychelles)	Brittney Tam / Rachel Honderich; Allisen Camille / Juliette Ah-Wan				w/o
5	(Canada) (Seychelles)	Nyl Yakura / Kristen Tsai; Steve Malcouzane / Juliette Ah-Wan				w/o

Malaysia
5
Carrara Sports and Leisure Centre, Gold Coast
6 April

Seychelles
0

			1	2	3
1	(Malaysia) (Seychelles)	Goh Soon Huat; Kervin Ghislain	21; 10	21; 5
2	(Malaysia) (Seychelles)	Soniia Cheah; Juliette Ah-Wan				w/o
3	(Malaysia) (Seychelles)	Tan Wee Kiong / Goh V Shem; Kervin Ghislain / Steve Malcouzane	21; 14	21; 12
4	(Malaysia) (Seychelles)	Vivian Hoo / Chow Mei Kuan; Juliette Ah-Wan / Allisen Camille				w/o
5	(Malaysia) (Seychelles)	Goh Soon Huat / Shevon Jemie Lai; Steve Malcouzane / Allisen Camille	21; 8	21; 4

Canada
5
Carrara Sports and Leisure Centre, Gold Coast
6 April

Ghana
0

			1	2	3
1	(Canada) (Ghana)	Brian Yang; Emmanuel Donkor	21; 10	21; 10
2	(Canada) (Ghana)	Brittney Tam; Grace Atipaka	21; 7	21; 7
3	(Canada) (Ghana)	Jason Ho-Shue / Ty Alexander Lindeman; Emmanuel Donkor / Daniel Sam	21; 14	21; 15
4	(Canada) (Ghana)	Rachel Honderich / Kristen Tsai; Stella Koteikai Amasah / Gifty Mensah	21; 10	21; 8
5	(Canada) (Ghana)	Brian Yang / Michelle Li; Daniel Sam / Eyram Migbodzi	21; 11	21; 13

Malaysia
4
Carrara Sports and Leisure Centre, Gold Coast
6 April

Canada
1

			1	2	3
1	(Malaysia) (Canada)	Goh Soon Huat / Shevon Jemie Lai; Nyl Yakura / Kristen Tsai	21; 17	21; 12
2	(Malaysia) (Canada)	Lee Chong Wei; Jason Ho-Shue	21; 6	21; 5
3	(Malaysia) (Canada)	Soniia Cheah; Michelle Li	21; 14	19; 21	15; 21
4	(Malaysia) (Canada)	Goh V Shem / Tan Wee Kiong; Jason Ho-Shue / Nyl Yakura	21; 14	21; 13
5	(Malaysia) (Canada)	Vivian Hoo / Chow Mei Kuan; Rachel Honderich / Kristen Tsai	21; 16	21; 9

Seychelles
DSQ
Carrara Sports and Leisure Centre, Gold Coast
6 April

Ghana

			1	2	3
1	(Seychelles) (Ghana)	Kervin Ghislain / Allisen Camille; Daniel Sam / Stella Koteikai Amasah				not played
2	(Seychelles) (Ghana)	Steve Malcouzane; Abraham Ayittey				not played
3	(Seychelles) (Ghana)	Juliette Ah-Wan; Gifty Mensah				not played
4	(Seychelles) (Ghana)	Steve Malcouzane / Kervin Ghislain; Michael Opoku Baah / Emmanuel Donkor				not played
5	(Seychelles) (Ghana)	Juliette Ah-Wan / Allisen Camille; Grace Atipaka / Eyram Migbodzi				not played

== Knockout stage ==
Quarter-finals
1	India	3
8	Mauritius	0
4	Singapore	3
5	Australia	0
7	Canada	0
3	England	3
6	Scotland	0
2	Malaysia	3

Semi-finals
1	India	3
4	Singapore	1
3	England	0
2	Malaysia	3

Gold medal game
1	India	3
2	Malaysia	1
Bronze medal game
4	Singapore	0
3	England	3

=== Quarter-finals ===
India
3
Carrara Sports and Leisure Centre, Gold Coast
7 April

Mauritius
0

			1	2	3
1	(India) (Mauritius)	Satwiksairaj Rankireddy / Chirag Shetty; Aatish Lubah / Christopher Jean Paul	21; 12	21; 3
2	(India) (Mauritius)	Ashwini Ponnappa / N. Sikki Reddy; Aurélie Allet / Nicki Chan-Lam	21; 8	21; 7
3	(India) (Mauritius)	Srikanth Kidambi; Julien Paul	21; 12	21; 14
4	(India) (Mauritius)	Saina Nehwal; Kate Foo Kune				not played
5	(India) (Mauritius)	Satwiksairaj Rankireddy / N. Sikki Reddy; Julien Paul / Aurélie Allet				not played

Singapore
3
Carrara Sports and Leisure Centre, Gold Coast
7 April

Australia
0

			1	2	3
1	(Singapore) (Australia)	Terry Hee / Tan Wei Han; Matthew Chau / Setyana Mapasa	21; 17	18; 21	21; 16
2	(Singapore) (Australia)	Loh Kean Yew; Anthony Joe	21; 8	21; 6
3	(Singapore) (Australia)	Terry Hee / Danny Bawa Chrisnanta; Robin Middleton / Ross Smith	21; 15	21; 14
4	(Singapore) (Australia)	Yeo Jia Min; Wendy Chen				not played
5	(Singapore) (Australia)	Ren-ne Ong / Crystal Wong; Gronya Somerville / Setyana Mapasa				not played

Canada
0
Carrara Sports and Leisure Centre, Gold Coast
7 April

England
3

			1	2	3
1	(Canada) (England)	Jason Ho-Shue / Nyl Yakura; Marcus Ellis / Chris Langridge	15; 21	18; 21
2	(Canada) (England)	Michelle Li; Chloe Birch	15; 21	21; 12	15; 21
3	(Canada) (England)	Brian Yang; Rajiv Ouseph	17; 21	14; 21
4	(Canada) (England)	Rachel Honderich / Kristen Tsai; Lauren Smith / Sarah Walker				not played
5	(Canada) (England)	Brian Yang / Michelle Li; Chris Adcock / Gabby Adcock				not played

Scotland
0
Carrara Sports and Leisure Centre, Gold Coast
7 April

Malaysia
3

			1	2	3
1	(Scotland) (Malaysia)	Adam Hall / Julie MacPherson; Chan Peng Soon / Goh Liu Ying	21; 14	18; 21	15; 21
2	(Scotland) (Malaysia)	Kieran Merrilees; Lee Chong Wei	14; 21	7; 21
3	(Scotland) (Malaysia)	Alexander Dunn / Adam Hall; Goh V Shem / Tan Wee Kiong	10; 21	15; 21
4	(Scotland) (Malaysia)	Kirsty Gilmour; Soniia Cheah				not played
5	(Scotland) (Malaysia)	Eleanor O'Donnell / Julie MacPherson; Vivian Hoo / Chow Mei Kuan				not played

=== Semi-finals ===
India
3
Carrara Sports and Leisure Centre, Gold Coast
8 April

Singapore
1

			1	2	3
1	(India) (Singapore)	Satwiksairaj Rankireddy / Ashwini Ponnappa; Terry Hee / Crystal Wong	22; 20	21; 18
2	(India) (Singapore)	Srikanth Kidambi; Loh Kean Yew	21; 17	21; 14
3	(India) (Singapore)	Satwiksairaj Rankireddy / Chirag Shetty; Terry Hee / Danny Bawa Chrisnanta	21; 17	19; 21	12; 21
4	(India) (Singapore)	Saina Nehwal; Yeo Jia Min	21; 8	21; 15
5	(India) (Singapore)	Ashwini Ponnappa / N. Sikki Reddy; Ren-ne Ong / Crystal Wong				not played

England
0
Carrara Sports and Leisure Centre, Gold Coast
8 April

Malaysia
3

			1	2	3
1	(England) (Malaysia)	Chris Langridge / Marcus Ellis; Goh V Shem / Tan Wee Kiong	9; 21	11; 21
2	(England) (Malaysia)	Chloe Birch; Soniia Cheah	17; 21	21; 15	18; 21
3	(England) (Malaysia)	Rajiv Ouseph; Lee Chong Wei	18; 21	16; 21
4	(England) (Malaysia)	Lauren Smith / Sarah Walker; Vivian Hoo / Chow Mei Kuan				not played
5	(England) (Malaysia)	Chris Adcock / Gabby Adcock; Chan Peng Soon / Goh Liu Ying				not played

=== Bronze medal game ===
Singapore
0
Carrara Sports and Leisure Centre, Gold Coast
9 April

England
3

			1	2	3
1	(Singapore) (England)	Terry Hee / Crystal Wong; Marcus Ellis / Lauren Smith	21; 16	19; 21	18; 21
2	(Singapore) (England)	Loh Kean Yew; Rajiv Ouseph	22; 20	15; 21	23; 25
3	(Singapore) (England)	Terry Hee / Danny Bawa Chrisnanta; Chris Langridge / Marcus Ellis	9; 21	21; 19	13; 21
4	(Singapore) (England)	Yeo Jia Min; Chloe Birch				not played
5	(Singapore) (England)	Ren-ne Ong / Crystal Wong; Lauren Smith / Sarah Walker				not played

=== Gold medal game ===
India
3
Carrara Sports and Leisure Centre, Gold Coast
9 April

Malaysia
1

			1	2	3
1	(India) (Malaysia)	Satwiksairaj Rankireddy / Ashwini Ponnappa; Chan Peng Soon / Goh Liu Ying	21; 14	15; 21	21; 15
2	(India) (Malaysia)	Srikanth Kidambi; Lee Chong Wei	21; 17	21; 14
3	(India) (Malaysia)	Satwiksairaj Rankireddy / Chirag Shetty; Goh V Shem / Tan Wee Kiong	15; 21	20; 22
4	(India) (Malaysia)	Saina Nehwal; Soniia Cheah	21; 11	19; 21	21; 9
5	(India) (Malaysia)	N. Sikki Reddy / Ashwini Ponnappa; Vivian Hoo / Chow Mei Kuan				not played
