= Falkland Islands national badminton team =

National badminton team representing the Falkland Islands

Falkland Islands
- Association: Falkland Islands Badminton (FIB)
- Confederation: BPA (Pan America)
- President: Dwight Joshua

BWF ranking
- Current ranking: Unranked (2 January 2024)
- Highest ranking: 97 (4 October 2012)

Pan Am Women's Team Championships
- Appearances: 1 (first in 2020)
- Best result: Group stage

The Falkland Islands national badminton team represents Falkland Islands in international badminton team competitions. The Falkland Islands women's team participated in the Pan American Badminton Championships in 2020 and finished in 7th place after losing the 6th place playoffs to Peru.

The Falkland Islands made their Commonwealth badminton debut in the 2010 Commonwealth Games when five representatives were selected to compete in singles and doubles.

== Participation in Commonwealth Games ==
Mixed team

Year	Result
2010	Group stage
2014	Group stage

== Participation in Pan American Badminton Championships ==
Women's team

Year	Result
2020	7th place

== Participation in Island Games ==
Year	Result
(Isle of Wight) 1993	Group stage
(Jersey) 1997	Group stage
(Åland) 2009	Group stage
(Isle of Wight) 2011	Group stage
(Bermuda) 2013	Group stage
(Jersey) 2015	Group stage
(Gotland) 2017	Group stage
(Gibraltar) 2019	Group stage

== Players ==
=== Current squad ===
As of 2 January 2024

==== Men's team ====
Name	DoB/Age	Ranking of event		
Name	DoB/Age	MS	MD	XD
Douglas Clark	19 June 1977 (age 48)	-	-	-
Ross Stewart	21 December 1997 (age 27)	-	-	-
Dominic Jeffrey	9 March 1995 (age 30)	-	-	-
Ben Chater	28 September 2006 (age 19)	-	-	-

==== Women's team ====
Name	DoB/Age	Ranking of event		
Name	DoB/Age	WS	WD	XD
Vicky Chater	9 April 1988 (age 37)	-	-	-
Soraye March	23 November 2004 (age 20)	-	-	-
Zoe Morris	6 September 1998 (age 27)	-	-	-
Louise Williams	1 May 1999 (age 26)	-	-	-
