= Le Tocq =

Le Tocq is a surname. Notable people with the surname include:

- Jonathan Le Tocq (born 1964), Guernsey politician
- Paul Le Tocq (born 1981), Guernsey badminton player
