= Mykola Dmitrishin =

Ukrainian badminton player (born 1990)

Personal information
- Born: Микола Володимирович Дмитришин; 4 September 1990 (age 35)

Sport
- Country: Ukraine
- Sport: Badminton

Men's singles & doubles
- Highest ranking: 284 (MS 8 April 2010); 213 (MD 22 April 2010); 168 (XD 15 October 2009)
- BWF profile

Mykola Volodymyrovych Dmitrishin (Ukrainian: Микола Володимирович Дмитришин; born 4 September 1990) is a Ukrainian badminton player.

== Achievements ==
=== BWF International Challenge/Series ===
Men's doubles

Year	Tournament	Partner	Opponent	Score	Result
2011	Banuinvest International	(Ukraine) Vitaly Konov	(Republic of Ireland) Sam Magee (Republic of Ireland) Tony Stephenson	13–21, 14–21	(silver) Runner-up

Mixed doubles

Year	Tournament	Partner	Opponent	Score	Result
2013	Slovak Open	(Ukraine) Yelyzaveta Zharka	(Czech Republic) Jakub Bitman (Czech Republic) Alžběta Bášová	16–21, 20–22	(silver) Runner-up

BWF International Challenge tournament
BWF International Series tournament
BWF Future Series tournament
