= Vitaly Konov =

Ukrainian badminton player

Personal information
- Born: Віталій Сергійович Конов; 13 July 1987 (age 39) Priozersk, Soviet Union
- Height: 1.77 m (5 ft 10 in)

Sport
- Country: Ukraine
- Sport: Badminton
- Handedness: Right
- Coached by: Mykhaylo Sterin

Men's singles & doubles
- Highest ranking: 97 (MS 22 April 2010); 47 (MD 2 December 2010); 92 (XD 29 August 2013)
- BWF profile

Vitaly Serhiyovych Konov (Ukrainian: Віталій Сергійович Конов; born 13 July 1987) is a Ukrainian badminton player.

== Achievements ==
=== BWF International Challenge/Series ===
Men's singles
Year	Tournament	Opponent	Score	Result
2013	Slovak Open	(Poland) Michał Rogalski	21–18, 25–23	(gold) Winner
2012	Kharkiv International	(Denmark) Emil Holst	17–21, 8–21	(silver) Runner-up
2011	Hungarian International	(Denmark) Rasmus Fladberg	17–21, 10–21	(silver) Runner-up

Men's doubles
Year	Tournament	Partner	Opponent	Score	Result
2014	Kharkiv International	(Ukraine) Dmytro Zavadsky	(Ukraine) Gennadiy Natarov (Ukraine) Artem Pochtarev	6–11, 8–11, 9–11	(silver) Runner-up
2011	Banuinvest International	(Ukraine) Mykola Dmytryshyn	(Republic of Ireland) Sam Magee (Republic of Ireland) Tony Stephenson	13–21, 14–21	(silver) Runner-up

Mixed doubles
Year	Tournament	Partner	Opponent	Score	Result
2012	Slovak Open	(Ukraine) Yelyzaveta Zharka	(Czech Republic) Jakub Bitman (Czech Republic) Alžběta Bášová	21–12, 17–21, 19–21	(silver) Runner-up

BWF International Challenge tournament
BWF International Series tournament
BWF Future Series tournament
