= Tereza Švábíková =

Czech badminton player

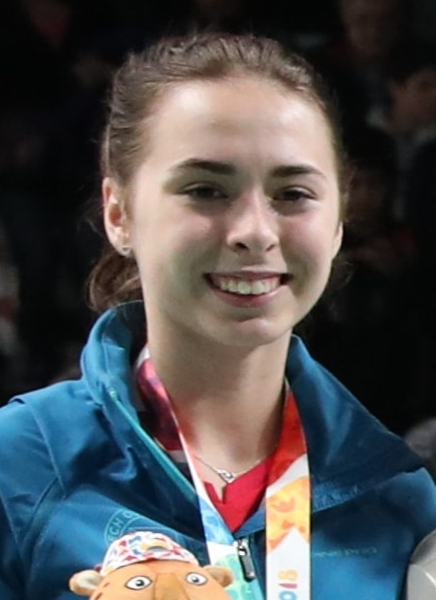
- Švábíková at the 2018 Summer Youth Olympics

Personal information
- Born: 14 May 2000 (age 26) Klimkovice, Czech Republic

Sport
- Country: Czech Republic
- Sport: Badminton
- Handedness: Right
- Coached by: Luděk Žídek

Women's singles & doubles
- Highest ranking: 65 (WS 25 June 2024); 65 (WD with Kateřina Tomalová, 25 May 2017); 52 (XD with Ondřej Král, 14 April 2026)
- Current ranking: 77 (WS); 103 (XD with Ondřej Král) (27 October 2026)
- BWF profile
Medal record
Women's Badminton
Representing (International Olympic Committee) Mixed-NOCs
Youth Olympic Games
Bronze medal – third place	2018 Buenos Aires	Mixed team

Tereza Švábíková (born 14 May 2000) is a Czech badminton player from B.O. Chance Ostrava.

== Career ==
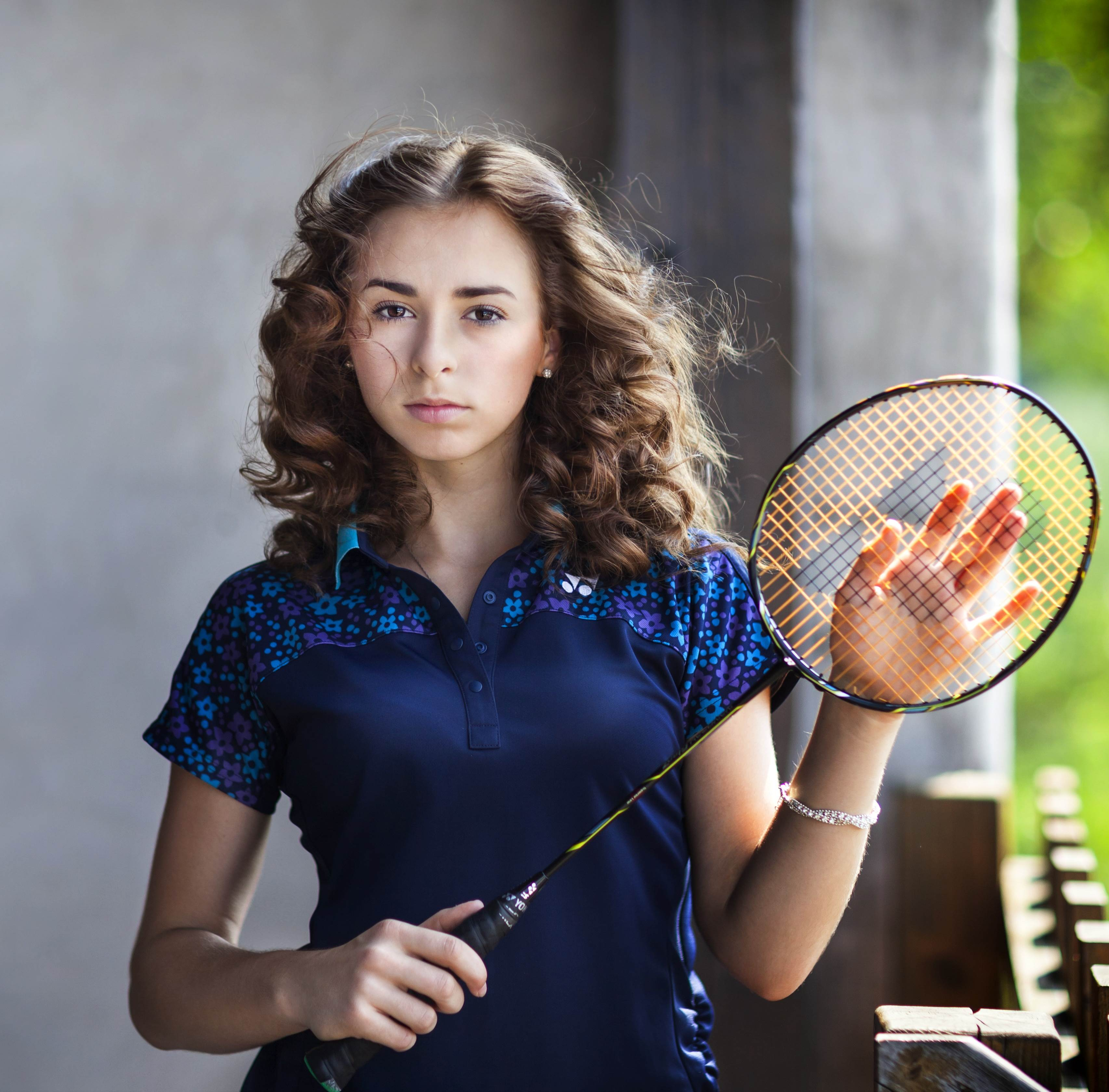
Švábíková in 2015

She started playing badminton at her hometown Klimkovice in 2008. The biggest senior international achievements: 9.place at EC2017 in WD, Qualified to WC 2017 in WD,2. place at Yonex Latvia International 2017 in WS, 2. place at Czech International 2017 in XD, 2. place at Romanian International 2017 in XD, 3.place at Polish Open 2017 in WD,2. place at Yonex Lithuania International 2017 in XD,2. place at Yonex Latvia International 2017 in XD. The biggest junior international achievements: WS: 5.place at EJC 2017,1.place at Slovenia junior 2016, Cyprus junior 2014 2.place at Cyprus junior 2015, Slovakia junior 2015, 3.place at Swedish junior 2017, Hungarian junior 2017, Hungarian junior 2016, WD: 1.place at Hungarian junior 2017, Cyprus junior 2015, 2.place at Slovakia junior 2016, Hungarian junior 2016, Slovakia junior 2015, XD: 1.place at Cyprus junior 2014 2.place at Cyprus junior 2015 3.place at Czech junior 2016, Slovenia Junior. 2016. National senior achievements: WS: 1.place at Czech national championship in 2017,2018,2019 and 2020, 3.place at Czech national championship 2016, WD: 3.place at Czech national championship 2017, Junior national achievements: 23 Czech champion titles, The best Czech junior player of 2016 and 2017 In May 2017, she became the mixed doubles runner-up in three BWF Future Series tournaments partnered with Filip Budzel. At the Czech International they were beaten by their compatriots Jakub Bitman and Alzbeta Basova. In Romania, they were defeated by the German pair, and in Latvia defeated by the French pair.

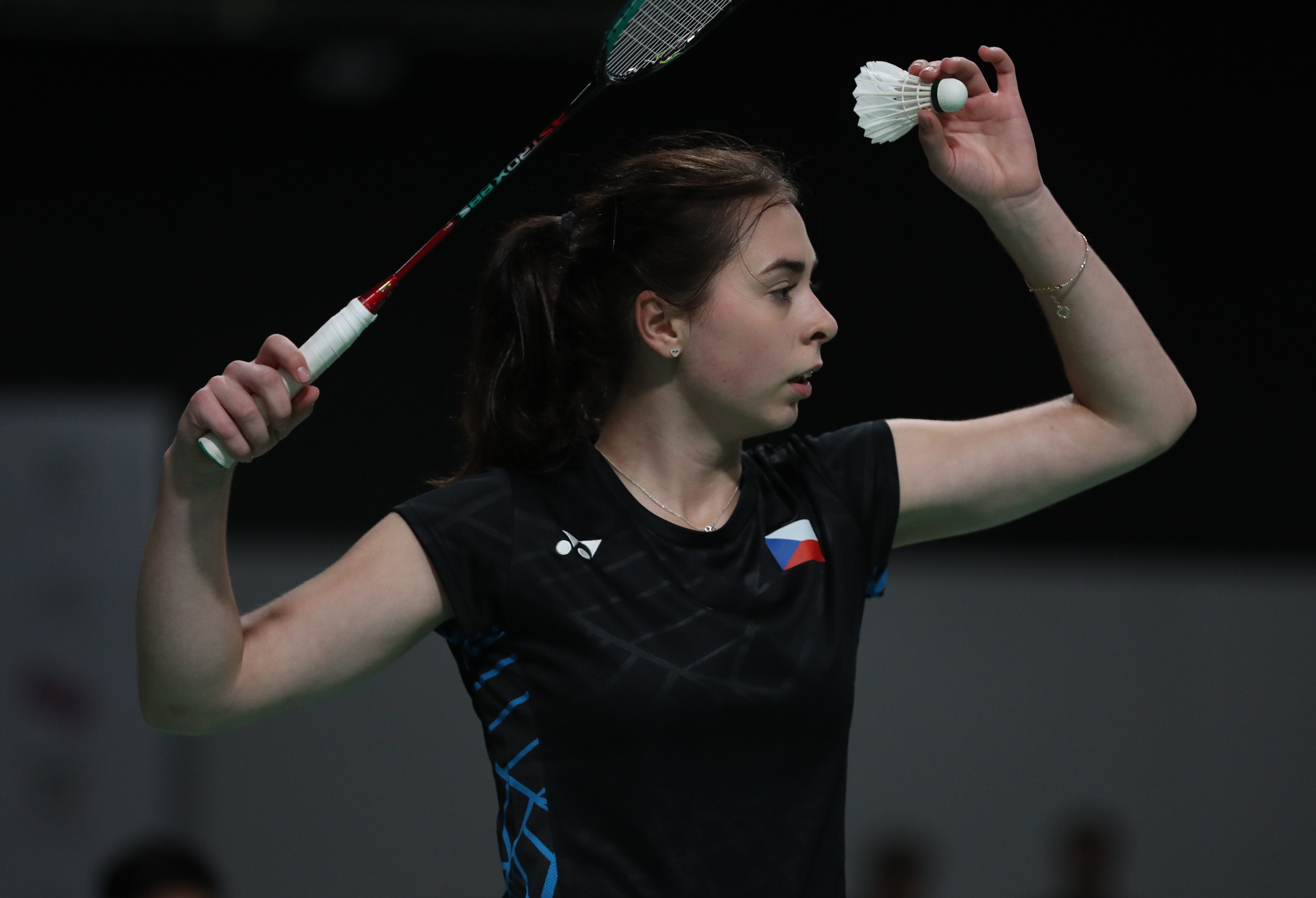
Švábíková at the 2018 Summer Youth Olympics

== Achievements ==
=== BWF International Challenge/Series (1 title, 7 runner-up) ===
Women's singles
Year	Tournament	Opponent	Score	Result
2017	Lithuanian International	(Denmark) Anne Hald	18–21, 0–3 retired	(silver) Runner-up
2019	Suriname International	(Mexico) Haramara Gaitan	21–16, 10–21, 21–23	(silver) Runner-up
2026	Senegal International	(Switzerland) Jenjira Stadelmann	21–13, 11–21, 21–8	(gold) Winner

Women's doubles
Year	Tournament	Partner	Opponent	Score	Result
2019	Carebaco International	(Czech Republic) Kateřina Tomalová	(Barbados) Monyata Riviera (Barbados) Tamisha Williams	Walkover	(silver) Runner-up

Mixed doubles
Year	Tournament	Partner	Opponent	Score	Result
2017	Czech International	(Czech Republic) Filip Budzel	(Czech Republic) Jakub Bitman (Czech Republic) Alžběta Bášová	19–21, 21–19, 17–21	(silver) Runner-up
2017	Romanian International	(Czech Republic) Filip Budzel	(Germany) Lukas Resch (Germany) Miranda Wilson	21–15, 16–21, 23–25	(silver) Runner-up
2017	Latvia International	(Czech Republic) Filip Budzel	(France) Fabien Delrue (France) Juliette Moinard	12–21, 21–19, 11–21	(silver) Runner-up
2017	Lithuanian International	(Czech Republic) Filip Budzel	(Republic of Ireland) Ciaran Chambers (Republic of Ireland) Sinead Chambers	21–17, 18–21, 18–21	(silver) Runner-up

BWF International Challenge tournament
BWF International Series tournament
BWF Future Series tournament
