= Jakub Bitman =

Czech badminton player (born 1988)

Personal information
- Born: 22 July 1988 (age 38)
- Height: 1.84 m (6 ft 0 in)
- Weight: 82 kg (181 lb)

Sport
- Country: Czech Republic
- Sport: Badminton
- Handedness: Right

Men's singles & doubles
- Highest ranking: 150 (MS 15 April 2010); 72 (MD 21 January 2010); 55 (XD 15 June 2017)
- BWF profile

Jakub Bitman (born 22 July 1988) is a Czech badminton player.

== Achievements ==
=== BWF International Challenge/Series ===
Men's singles
Year	Tournament	Opponent	Score	Result
2012	Slovak Open	(Slovenia) Iztok Utroša	9–21, 7–11 retired	(silver) Runner-up

Men's doubles
Year	Tournament	Partner	Opponent	Score	Result
2007	Slovak International	(Croatia) Zvonimir Đurkinjak	(Russia) Ivan Sozonov (Russia) Anton Ivanov	Walkover	(gold) Winner
2008	Croatian International	(Croatia) Zvonimir Đurkinjak	(India) Rupesh Kumar K. T. (India) Sanave Thomas	9–21, 14–21	(silver) Runner-up
2008	Slovak Open	(Croatia) Zvonimir Đurkinjak	(Iceland) Magnús Ingi Helgason (Iceland) Helgi Jóhannesson	11–21, 14–21	(silver) Runner-up
2016	Slovak Open	(Czech Republic) Pavel Drančák	(Poland) Łukasz Moreń (Poland) Wojciech Szkudlarczyk	8–11, 8–11, 5–11	(silver) Runner-up

Mixed doubles
Year	Tournament	Partner	Opponent	Score	Result
2012	Slovak Open	(Czech Republic) Alžběta Bášová	(Ukraine) Vitaly Konov (Ukraine) Yelyzaveta Zharka	12–21, 21–17, 21–19	(gold) Winner
2012	Hungarian International	(Czech Republic) Alžběta Bášová	(Croatia) Zvonimir Đurkinjak (Croatia) Staša Poznanović	16–21, 18–21	(silver) Runner-up
2013	Slovak Open	(Czech Republic) Alžběta Bášová	(Ukraine) Mykola Dmitrishin (Ukraine) Yelyzaveta Zharka	21–16, 22–20	(gold) Winner
2013	Czech International	(Czech Republic) Alžběta Bášová	(Chinese Taipei) Wang Chi-lin (Chinese Taipei) Wu Ti-jung	19–21, 13–21	(silver) Runner-up
2014	Hungarian International	(Czech Republic) Alžběta Bášová	(England) Ben Lane (England) Jessica Pugh	4–11, 10–11, 7–11	(silver) Runner-up
2016	Slovak Open	(Czech Republic) Alžběta Bášová	(Slovenia) Miha Ivanič (Slovenia) Nika Arih	12–10, 11–4, 11–6	(gold) Winner
2017	Czech International	(Czech Republic) Alžběta Bášová	(Czech Republic) Filip Budzel (Czech Republic) Tereza Švábíková	21–19, 19–21, 21–17	(gold) Winner
2018	Polish International	(Czech Republic) Alžběta Bášová	(Poland) Paweł Śmiłowski (Poland) Magdalena Świerczyńska	21–17, 12–21, 21–14	(gold) Winner
2019	Czech Open	(Czech Republic) Alžběta Bášová	(France) William Villeger (France) Sharone Bauer	21–15, 23–21	(gold) Winner

BWF International Challenge tournament
BWF International Series tournament
BWF Future Series tournament
