= Badminton at the 2011 Island Games =

Badminton at the 2011 Island Games was held from June 26 – July 1, 2011, at the Ryde High School Sports Hall.

== Events ==
=== Medal table ===
Rank	Nation	Gold	Silver	Bronze	Total
1	Guernsey (GGY)	3	3	1	7
2	Isle of Man (IOM)	1	1	3	5
3	Faroe Islands (FRO)	1	1	1	3
4	Isle of Wight (IOW)	1	0	1	2
5	Greenland (GRL)	0	1	0	1
Totals (5 entries)		6	6	6	18

=== Men ===
Event	Gold	Silver	Bronze
Singles	(Isle of Man) Joshua Green	(Greenland) Bror Madsen	(Guernsey) Paul Le Tocq
Doubles	Faroe Islands; Niclas Højgaard Eysturoy; Aksel Poulsen	Guernsey; Paul Le Tocq; Kevin Le Moigne	Isle of Man; Joshua Green; Benjamin Li

=== Women ===
Event	Gold	Silver	Bronze
Singles	(Isle of Wight) Anna Showan	(Guernsey) Kiara Green	(Isle of Man) Kimberley Clague
Doubles	Guernsey; Kiara Green; Gayle Lloyd	Guernsey; Sarah Garbutt; Renée Stuart	Isle of Man; Cristen Callow; Kimberley Clague

=== Mixed ===
Event	Gold	Silver	Bronze
Doubles	Guernsey; Sarah Garbutt; Paul Le Tocq	Faroe Islands; Niclas Højgaard Eysturoy; Guri Poulsen	Isle of Wight; Anna Showan; Ian Walder

=== Team ===
Event	Gold	Silver	Bronze
Team	Guernsey	Isle of Man	Faroe Islands

== Results ==
=== Men's singles ===
==== Finals ====
Semifinals				Final
(Greenland) Bror Madsen	8	21	21
(Isle of Wight) Aksei Poulsen	21	14	19	(Greenland) Bror Madsen	7	9
(Guernsey) Paul Le Tocq	8	17		(Isle of Man) Joshua Green	21	21
(Isle of Man) Joshua Green	21	21

==== Bronze medal game ====
	Score		Set 1	Set 2	Set 3
Aksei Poulsen (Falkland Islands)	0–2	(Guernsey) Paul Le Tocq	17–21	19–21	

==== First round matches ====
	Score		Set 1	Set 2	Set 3
Mark Huagen (Bermuda)	2–0	(Falkland Islands) Duane March	21–13	21–8	
David Anderson (Isle of Wight)	0–2	(Faroe Islands) Rogvi Poul Poulsen	19–21	11–21	
Danny Penny (Guernsey)	0–2	(Menorca) Albert Navarro Comes	6–21	15–21	
David Delday (Orkney)	0–2	(Shetland) Jason Jamieson	6–21	13–21	
Miquel Montoya Moya (Menorca)	2–0	(Saint Helena) Ryan Benjamin	21–14	21–5	
Taatsi Pedersen (Greenland)	0–2	(Falkland Islands) Douglas Clark	13–21	15–21	
Neil Harding (Isle of Man)	2–1	(Gotland) Mattias Englund	14–21	21–12	21–10
Rohan Pai (Bermuda)	2–0	(Shetland) Brett Haining	21–16	21–18	
Jens Frederik Nielsen (Greenland)	2–0	(Isle of Man) Matthew Nicholson	21–5	21–7	
Juan Montoya Moya (Menorca)	2–0	(Gibraltar) Thomas Reidy	21–7	21–10	
Jon Southern (Jersey)	2–0	(Falkland Islands) Michael Brownlee	21–16	21–17	
James Linares (Gibraltar)	0–2	(Guernsey) Andrew Orme	19–21	13–21	
Ross Stewart (Falkland Islands)	2–0	(Saint Helena) Lee Yon	21–17	21–16	
Anders Lagerqvist (Gotland)	0–2	(Jersey) Jamie Smith	13–21	16–21	

==== Top half ====
Second round
(Greenland) Bror Madsen	21	21
(Gibraltar) Kasper Thy Jessen	10	15
(Jersey) Rob Cottignies	16	25	15
(Bermuda) Mark Huagen	21	23	21
(Isle of Man) Benjamin Li	21	21
(Shetland) Roy Wood	13	12
(Faroe Islands) Rógvi Poul Poulsen	13	17
(Menorca) Albert Navarro Comes	21	21
(Isle of Wight) Aksei Poulsen	21	21
(Jersey) Stuart Hady	18	11
(Shetland) Jason Jamieson	14	16
(Menorca) Miquel Montoya	21	21
(Isle of Wight) Christopher Massey	w/o
(Jersey) Alex Hutchings
(Falkland Islands) Doug Clark	19	11
(Isle of Man) Neil Harding	21	21

Third round
(Greenland) Bror Madsen	21	21
(Bermuda) Mark Huagen	11	7
(Isle of Man) Benjamin Li	9	11
(Menorca) Albert Navarro Comes	21	21
(Isle of Wight) Aksei Poulsen	21	21
(Menorca) Miquel Montoya	4	14
(Isle of Wight) Christopher Massey	24	14	21
(Isle of Man) Neil Harding	22	21	11

Quarterfinals
(Greenland) Bror Madsen	21	21
(Menorca) Albert Navarro Comes	10	19
(Isle of Wight) Aksei Poulsen	21	21
(Isle of Wight) Christopher Massey	9	16

Semifinals
(Greenland) Bror Madsen	8	21	21
(Isle of Wight) Aksei Poulsen	21	14	19

==== Bottom half ====
Second round
(Bermuda) Rohan Pai	14	12
(Greenland) Jens Frederik Nielsen	21	21
(Faroe Islands) Gunnar Poulsen	26	15
(Gotland) Daniel Soderstrom	28	21
(Menorca) Joan Montoya	17	21	21
(Jersey) Jon Southern	21	19	12
(Isle of Wight) Kesley Downer	14	12
(Guernsey) Paul Le Tocq	21	21
(Guernsey) Andrew Orme	21	21
(Falkland Islands) Ross Stewart	16	4
(Greenland) Mininnguaq Kleist	21	15	5
(Faroe Islands) Niclas Eysturoy	15	21	21
(Jersey) Jamie Smith	15	19
(Isle of Wight) Ian Walder	21	21
(Menorca) Pedro Bassa	6	16
(Isle of Man) Joshua Green	21	21

Third round
(Greenland) Jens Frederik Nielsen	21	14	23
(Gotland) Daniel Soderstrom	16	21	21
(Menorca) Joan Montoya	8	13
(Guernsey) Paul Le Tocq	21	21
(Guernsey) Andrew Orme	12	12
(Faroe Islands) Niclas Eysturoy	21	21
(Isle of Wight) Ian Walder	10	17
(Isle of Man) Joshua Green	21	21

Quarterfinals
(Greenland) Jens Frederik Nielsen	9	16
(Guernsey) Paul Le Tocq	21	21
(Faroe Islands) Niclas Eysturoy	9	16
(Isle of Man) Joshua Green	21	21

Semifinals
(Guernsey) Paul Le Tocq	8	17
(Isle of Man) Joshua Green	21	21

=== Men's doubles ===
==== First round matches ====
	Score		Set 1	Set 2	Set 3
T. Pedersen/J.F. Nielsen (Greenland)	1–2	(Guernsey) A. Orme/S. Hardy	21–12	12–21	18–21
J. Callow/N. Harding (Isle of Man)	2–0	(Gibraltar) J. Linares/T. Reidy	21–4	21–7	
I. Walder/D. Anderson (Isle of Wight)	2–1	(Jersey) J. Southern/J. Smith	21–17	21–23	21–17
R. Benjamin/Lee Yon (Saint Helena)	0–2	(Jersey) A. Hutchings/G. Carter	7–21	12–21	
I. DeHaro/K. Thy Jessen (Gibraltar)	1–2	(Isle of Wight) K. Downer/R. Gray	17–21	23–21	14–21
J. Jamieson/R. Wood (Shetland)	1–2	(Isle of Man) J. Green/B. Li	13–21	21–15	16–21
R. Dorush/M. Haugen (Bermuda)	0–2	(Menorca) P.A. Bassa/M.M. Moya	19–21	16–21	

==== Draw ====
Second round
(Faroe Islands) A. Poulsen (Faroe Islands) H.E. Eysturoy	21	21
(Falkland Islands) D. March (Falkland Islands) D. Jaffray	2	6
(Gotland) D. Soderstrom (Gotland) M. Englund	20	12
(Guernsey) A. Orme (Guernsey) S. Hardy	22	21
(Menorca) A.N. Comes (Menorca) J.M. Moya	23	21
(Isle of Man) J. Callow (Isle of Man) N. Harding	21	15
(Shetland) G. Keith (Shetland) G. Keith	21	17	12
(Isle of Wight) I. Walder (Isle of Wight) D. Anderson	15	21	21
(Jersey) R. Cottignies (Jersey) G. Carter	21	19	10
(Faroe Islands) H.K. Jacobsen (Faroe Islands) G. Poulsen	18	21	21
(Isle of Wight) K. Downer (Isle of Wight) R. Gray	13	18
(Isle of Wight) P. Le Tocq (Isle of Wight) K. Le Moigne	21	21
(Isle of Man) J. Green (Isle of Man) B. Li	21	21
(Falkland Islands) D. Clark (Falkland Islands) M. Brownlee	11	16
(Menorca) P. Ameller (Menorca) M.M. Moya	9	17
(Greenland) B. Madsen (Greenland) M. Nyvold	21	21

Quarterfinals
(Faroe Islands) A. Poulsen (Faroe Islands) H.E. Eysturoy	22	21
(Guernsey) A. Orme (Guernsey) S. Hardy	20	14
(Menorca) A.N. Comes (Menorca) J.M. Moya	21	21
(Isle of Wight) I. Walder (Isle of Wight) D. Anderson	9	10
(Faroe Islands) H.K. Jacobsen (Faroe Islands) G. Poulsen	18	18
(Isle of Wight) P. Le Tocq (Isle of Wight) K. Le Moigne	21	21
(Isle of Man) J. Green (Isle of Man) B. Li	21	21
(Greenland) B. Madsen (Greenland) M. Nyvold	18	18

Semifinals
(Faroe Islands) A. Poulsen (Faroe Islands) H.E. Eysturoy	21	21
(Menorca) A.N. Comes (Menorca) J.M. Moya	15	14
(Isle of Wight) P. Le Tocq (Isle of Wight) K. Le Moigne	21	20	21
(Isle of Man) J. Green (Isle of Man) B. Li	13	22	18

Final
(Faroe Islands) A. Poulsen (Faroe Islands) H.E. Eysturoy	18	22	21
(Isle of Wight) P. Le Tocq (Isle of Wight) K. Le Moigne	21	20	12

==== Bronze medal game ====
	Score		Set 1	Set 2	Set 3
A.N. Comes/J.M. Moya (Menorca)	0–2	(Isle of Man) J. Green/B. Li	18–21	18–21	

=== Women's singles ===
==== Finals ====
Semifinals			Final
(Isle of Wight) Anna Showan	21	21
(Greenland) Sara Jacobsen	18	10	(Isle of Wight) Anna Showan	21	21
(Guernsey) Kiara Green	21	21	(Guernsey) Kiara Green	5	16
(Isle of Man) Kim Clague	14	13

==== Bronze medal game ====
	Score		Set 1	Set 2	Set 3
Sara Jacobsen (Greenland)	0–2	(Isle of Man) Kim Clague	16–21	19–21	

==== First round matches ====
	Score		Set 1	Set 2	Set 3
Stephanie Keith (Shetland)	1–2	(Gibraltar) Alison Avellano	21–19	17–21	4–21
Tiphanie May (Falkland Islands)	0–2	(Faroe Islands) Guri Poulsen	6–21	2–21	
Francina Florit Capo (Menorca)	0–2	(Isle of Man) Laura Beggs	8–21	10–21	
Denise Insley (Isle of Wight)	2–0	(Gibraltar) Chantal De'ath	21–11	21–10	

==== Top half ====
Second round
(Isle of Man) Cristen Callow	21	21
(Menorca) Lidia March	4	3
(Greenland) Anja Kjeldsen	21	17	19
(Guernsey) Anika Johnson	14	21	21
(Isle of Wight) Anna Showan	21	21
(Jersey) Katherine Thornton	8	7
(Gotland) Sofia Oscarsson	21	21
(Gibraltar) Alison Avellano	16	10
(Guernsey) Gayle Lloyd	21	21
(Shetland) Shona Keith	8	10
(Jersey) Lindsey Woodward	16	21	24
(Isle of Wight) Adrienne White	21	14	22
(Greenland) Sara Jacobsen	22	21
(Menorca) Ana Mamajón Camino	20	18
(Isle of Man) Kayleigh Callow	12	7
(Faroe Islands) Guri Poulsen	21	21

Third round
(Isle of Man) Cristen Callow	21	21
(Guernsey) Anika Johnson	3	5
(Isle of Wight) Anna Showan	21	21
(Gotland) Sofia Oscarsson	10	5
(Guernsey) Gayle Lloyd	21	21
(Jersey) Lindsey Woodward	8	7
(Greenland) Sara Jacobsen	21	21
(Faroe Islands) Guri Poulsen	14	18

Quarterfinals
(Isle of Man) Cristen Callow	21	12
(Isle of Wight) Anna Showan	23	21
(Guernsey) Gayle Lloyd	13	18
(Greenland) Sara Jacobsen	21	21

Semifinals
(Isle of Wight) Anna Showan	21	21
(Greenland) Sara Jacobsen	10	18

==== Bottom half ====
Second round
(Isle of Man) Laura Beggs	21	21
(Shetland) Kirstin Sineath	14	7
(Jersey) Jade Coombs-Goodfellow	7	8
(Guernsey) Kiara Green	21	21
(Greenland) Susanne Wahlborn	21	21
(Isle of Wight) Gillian Bushell	10	8
(Gibraltar) Sevelanne Gordon	w/o
(Faroe Islands) Rannva Carlsson
(Isle of Wight) Denise Insley	21	21
(Falkland Islands) Sofia Arkhipkina	10	10
(Faroe Islands) Hanna Age	7	1
(Gotland) Caroline Gate	21	21
(Greenland) Hedvig Broberg	21	21
(Jersey) Cara Dunford	9	18
(Guernsey) Sarah Garbutt	14	16
(Isle of Man) Kim Clague	21	21

Third round
(Isle of Man) Laura Beggs	15	5
(Guernsey) Kiara Green	21	21
(Greenland) Susanne Wahlborn	21	21
(Gibraltar) Sevelanne Gordon	12	6
(Isle of Wight) Denise Insley	12	4
(Gotland) Caroline Gate	21	21
(Greenland) Hedvig Broberg	10	6
(Isle of Man) Kim Clague	21	21

Quarterfinals
(Guernsey) Kiara Green	21	21
(Greenland) Susanne Wahlborn	9	7
(Gotland) Caroline Gate	21	13	18
(Isle of Man) Kim Clague	19	21	21

Semifinals
(Guernsey) Kiara Green}	21	21
(Isle of Man) Kim Clague	14	13

=== Women's doubles ===
==== First round matches ====
	Score		Set 1	Set 2	Set 3
D. Blais/R. Cespedes (Bermuda)	0–2	(Isle of Man) N. Wilkinson/K. Callow	14–21	6–21	
A.M. Camina/L.M. Rodriguez (Menorca)	0–2	(Greenland) I. Olsen/A.S. Kjedsen	18–21	15–21	
D. Insley/G. Bushell (Isle of Wight)	2–0	(Jersey) L. Woodward/K. Thornton	21–15	21–14	

==== Draw ====
Second round
(Guernsey) G. Lloyd (Guernsey) K. Green	21	21
(Isle of Wight) A. White (Isle of Wight) K. Murrant	18	12
(Greenland) S. Wahlborn (Greenland) S.L. Jacobsen	18	15
(Shetland) A. Leask (Shetland) S. Pearson	21	21
(Jersey) J. Coombs-Goodfellow (Jersey) C. Dunford	21	21
(Gibraltar) A. Avellano (Gibraltar) S. Gordon	8	14
(Falkland Islands) A. Luxton (Falkland Islands) J. Turner	6	9
(Isle of Man) N. Wilkinson (Isle of Man) K. Callow	21	21
(Greenland) I. Olsen (Greenland) A.S. Kjedsen	18	19
(Guernsey) S. Garbutt (Guernsey) R. Stuart	21	21
(Gotland) C. Gate (Gotland) S. Oscarsson	14	16
(Faroe Islands) R.D. Carlsson (Faroe Islands) G. Poulsen	21	21
(Isle of Wight) D. Insley (Isle of Wight) G. Bushell	21	21
(Falkland Islands) S. Arkhipkina (Falkland Islands) C. March	9	5
(Shetland) S. Keith (Shetland) S. Keith	21	15	13
(Isle of Man) C. Callow (Isle of Man) K. Clague	18	21	21

Quarterfinals
(Guernsey) G. Lloyd (Guernsey) K. Green	21	21
(Shetland) A. Leask (Shetland) S. Pearson	13	16
(Jersey) J. Coombs-Goodfellow (Jersey) C. Dunford	19	21	21
(Isle of Man) N. Wilkinson (Isle of Man) K. Callow	21	9	15
(Guernsey) S. Garbutt (Guernsey) R. Stuart	w/o
(Gotland) C. Gate (Gotland) S. Oscarsson
(Isle of Wight) D. Insley (Isle of Wight) G. Bushell	16	10
(Isle of Man) C. Callow (Isle of Man) K. Clague	21	21

Semifinals
(Guernsey) G. Lloyd (Guernsey) K. Green	21	21
(Jersey) J. Coombs-Goodfellow (Jersey) C. Dunford	4	13
(Guernsey) S. Garbutt (Guernsey) R. Stuart	21	19	21
(Isle of Man) C. Callow (Isle of Man) K. Clague	19	21	16

Final
(Guernsey) G. Lloyd (Guernsey) K. Green	21	21
(Guernsey) S. Garbutt (Guernsey) R. Stuart	14	17

==== Bronze medal game ====
	Score		Set 1	Set 2	Set 3
J. Coombs-Goodfellow/C. Dunford (Jersey)	0–2	(Isle of Man) C. Callow/K. Clague	10–21	16–21	

=== Mixed doubles ===
==== Finals ====
Semifinals				Final
(Guernsey) S. Garbutt (Guernsey) P. Le Tocq	21	21
(Greenland) I. Olsen (Greenland) J.F. Nielsen	18	12		(Guernsey) S. Garbutt (Guernsey) P. Le Tocq	21	21
(Faroe Islands) G. Poulsen (Faroe Islands) N.H. Eysturoy	21	9	21	(Faroe Islands) G. Poulsen (Faroe Islands) N.H. Eysturoy	11	6
(Isle of Wight) A. Showan (Isle of Wight) I. Walder	14	21	13

==== Bronze medal game ====
	Score		Set 1	Set 2	Set 3
A. Showan/I. Walder (Isle of Wight)	2–0	(Greenland) I. Olsen/J.F. Nielsen	21–15	21–15	

==== First round matches ====
	Score		Set 1	Set 2	Set 3
S. Arkhipkina/D.Jaffray (Falkland Islands)	0–2	(Menorca) L.M. Rodriguez/A.N. Comes	8–21	10–21	
L. Woodward/J. Smith (Jersey)	2–0	(Faroe Islands) H.A. Arge/R.P. Poulsen	21–13	21–13	
A. Luxton/D. Clark (Falkland Islands)	2–0	(Isle of Man) L. Beggs/M. Nicholson	21–14	21–18	
I. Olsen/J.F. Nielsen (Greenland)	2–1	(Gibraltar) A. Avellano/K. Thy Jessen	21–19	16–21	21–11
S. Pearson/G. Keith (Shetland)	2–0	(Falkland Islands) J. Turner/M. Brownlee	21–8	21–10	
S. Gordon/I. De Haro (Gibraltar)	1–2	(Menorca) A.M. Camina/P.A. Bassa	17–21	22–20	13–21
D. McDonald/R. Cottignies (Jersey)	0–2	(Guernsey) A. Johnson/A. Orme	18–21	19–21	
F.C. Capo/D. Lutzenkirchen (Menorca)	0–2	(Greenland) H. Broberg/T. Pedersen	12–21	10–21	
C. De'ath/J. Linares (Gibraltar)	0–2	(Gotland) S. Oscarsson/M. Englund	15–21	13–21	

==== Top half ====
Second round
(Guernsey) S. Garbutt (Guernsey) P. Le Tocq	21	21
(Bermuda) R. Cespedes (Bermuda) R. Pai	11	9
(Isle of Wight) D. Insley (Isle of Wight) D. Anderson	23	21
(Menorca) L.M. Rodriguez (Menorca) A.N. Comes	21	14
(Isle of Man) K. Clague (Isle of Man) B. Li	12	21	22
(Shetland) S. Keith (Shetland) J. Jamieson	21	17	20
(Greenland) A.S. Kjeldsen (Greenland) M. Nyvold	21	21
(Jersey) L. Woodward (Jersey) J. Smith	4	13
(Faroe Islands) R.D. Carlsson (Faroe Islands) A. Poulsen	21	21
(Shetland) A. Leask (Shetland) G. Keith	18	10
(Jersey) C. Dunford (Jersey) G. Carter	21	21
(Falkland Islands) A. Luxton (Falkland Islands) D. Clark	18	18
(Gotland) C. Gate (Gotland) D. Soderstrom	22	18	21
(Guernsey) R. Stuart (Guernsey) D. Penney	20	21	19
(Isle of Wight) K. Murrant (Isle of Wight) K. Downer	18	16
(Greenland) I. Olsen (Greenland) J.F. Nielsen	21	21

Third round
(Guernsey) S. Garbutt (Guernsey) P. Le Tocq	21	21
(Isle of Wight) D. Insley (Isle of Wight) D. Anderson	18	9
(Isle of Man) K. Clague (Isle of Man) B. Li	16	21	21
(Greenland) A.S. Kjeldsen (Greenland) M. Nyvold	21	13	19
(Faroe Islands) R.D. Carlsson (Faroe Islands) A. Poulsen	21	15	21
(Jersey) C. Dunford (Jersey) G. Carter	12	21	15
(Gotland) C. Gate (Gotland) D. Soderstrom	22	16	20
(Greenland) I. Olsen (Greenland) J.F. Nielsen	20	21	22

Quarterfinals
(Guernsey) S. Garbutt (Guernsey) P. Le Tocq	21	21
(Isle of Man) K. Clague (Isle of Man) B. Li	14	16
(Faroe Islands) R.D. Carlsson (Faroe Islands) A. Poulsen
(Greenland) I. Olsen (Greenland) J.F. Nielsen	w/o

Semifinals
(Guernsey) S. Garbutt (Guernsey) P. Le Tocq	21	21
(Greenland) I. Olsen (Greenland) J.F. Nielsen	18	12

==== Bottom half ====
Second round
(Shetland) R. Wood (Shetland) S. Pearson	20	13
(Menorca) A.M. Camina (Menorca) P.A. Bassa	22	21
(Isle of Wight) A. White (Isle of Wight) R. Gray	21	21
(Greenland) S. Wahlborn (Greenland) M. Kleist	18	19
(Guernsey) A. Johnson (Guernsey) A. Orme	21	15	21
(Bermuda) D. Blais (Bermuda) R. Dorush	12	21	9
(Faroe Islands) G. Poulsen (Faroe Islands) N.H. Eysturoy	21	21
(Isle of Man) C. Callow (Isle of Man) J. Callow	14	13
(Greenland) H. Broberg (Greenland) T. Pedersen	13	21	14
(Isle of Wight) A. Showan (Isle of Wight) I. Walder	21	10	21
(Falkland Islands) C. March (Falkland Islands) D. March	13	9
(Jersey) J. Coombs-Goodfellow (Jersey) A. Hutchings	21	21
(Gotland) S. Oscarsson (Gotland) M. Englund	21	13	20
(Isle of Man) N. Wilkinson (Isle of Man) N. Harding	19	21	22
(Shetland) K. Sineath (Shetland) B. Haining	8	13
(Guernsey) G. Lloyd (Guernsey) K. Le Moigne	21	21

Third round
(Menorca) A.M. Camina (Menorca) P.A. Bassa	21	21
(Isle of Wight) A. White (Isle of Wight) R. Gray	11	17
(Guernsey) A. Johnson (Guernsey) A. Orme	11	21	12
(Faroe Islands) G. Poulsen (Faroe Islands) N.H. Eysturoy	21	12	21
(Isle of Wight) A. Showan (Isle of Wight) I. Walder	21	21	21
(Jersey) J. Coombs-Goodfellow (Jersey) A. Hutchings	23	14	15
(Isle of Man) N. Wilkinson (Isle of Man) N. Harding	7	11
(Guernsey) G. Lloyd (Guernsey) K. Le Moigne	21	21

Quarterfinals
(Menorca) A.M. Camina (Menorca) P.A. Bassa	21	14
(Faroe Islands) G. Poulsen (Faroe Islands) N.H. Eysturoy	23	21
(Isle of Wight) A. Showan (Isle of Wight) I. Walder	18	24	21
(Guernsey) G. Lloyd (Guernsey) K. Le Moigne	21	22	13

Semifinals
(Faroe Islands) G. Poulsen (Faroe Islands) N.H. Eysturoy	21	9	21
(Isle of Wight) A. Showan (Isle of Wight) I. Walder	14	21	13

=== Team ===
==== Group A ====
Team	Pts	Pld	W	L	MF	MA
Faroe Islands	2	2	2	0	7	3
Isle of Wight	2	2	1	1	5	5
Shetland	0	1	0	1	1	4

June 26, 2011
Faroe Islands	4–1	Isle of Wight
June 26, 2011
Shetland	1–4	Isle of Wight
June 26, 2011
Faroe Islands	3–2	Shetland

==== Group B ====
Team	Pts	Pld	W	L	MF	MA
Guernsey	2	2	2	0	9	1
Menorca	1	2	1	1	6	4
Falkland Islands	0	2	0	2	0	10

June 26, 2011
Guernsey	5–0	Falkland Islands
June 26, 2011
Menorca	5–0	Falkland Islands
June 26, 2011
Guernsey	4–1	Menorca

==== Group C ====
Team	Pts	Pld	W	L	MF	MA
Greenland	2	2	2	0	9	1
Jersey	1	2	1	1	5	5
Gibraltar	0	2	0	2	1	9

June 26, 2011
Greenland	4–1	Gibraltar
June 26, 2011
Jersey	5–0	Gibraltar
June 26, 2011
Greenland	5–0	Jersey

==== Group D ====
Team	Pts	Pld	W	L	MF	MA
Isle of Man	2	2	2	0	9	1
Bermuda	1	2	1	1	3	7
Gotland	0	2	0	2	3	7

June 26, 2011
Isle of Man	5–0	Bermuda
June 26, 2011
Gotland	2–3	Bermuda
June 26, 2011
Isle of Man	4–1	Gotland

==== Places 5–8 ====
Team	Pts	Pld	W	L	MF	MA
Isle of Wight	3	3	3	0	14	1
Jersey	2	3	2	1	8	7
Menorca	1	3	1	2	6	9
Bermuda	0	3	0	3	2	13

June 27, 2011
Isle of Wight	5–0	Menorca
June 27, 2011
Jersey	4–1	Bermuda
June 27, 2011
Menorca	4–1	Bermuda
June 27, 2011
Isle of Wight	4–1	Jersey
June 27, 2011
Isle of Wight	5–0	Bermuda
June 27, 2011
Menorca	2–3	Jersey

==== Places 9–12 ====
Team	Pts	Pld	W	L	MF	MA
Shetland	3	3	3	0	11	4
Gotland	2	3	2	1	9	6
Gibraltar	1	3	1	2	6	9
Falkland Islands	0	3	0	3	4	11

June 27, 2011
Gibraltar	1–4	Gotland
June 27, 2011
Shetland	4–1	Falkland Islands
June 27, 2011
Falkland Islands	1–4	Gotland
June 27, 2011
Shetland	3–2	Gibraltar
June 27, 2011
Falkland Islands	2–3	Gibraltar
June 27, 2011
Shetland	4–1	Gotland

==== Semifinals ====
June 27, 2011	Faroe Islands	2–3	Guernsey
June 27, 2011	Greenland	0–5	Isle of Man

==== Bronze medal game ====
June 27, 2011	Greenland	0–3	Faroe Islands

==== Gold medal game ====
June 27, 2011	Guernsey	3–2	Isle of Man
