= Badminton at the 2017 Island Games =

- Dates: June 24 – 30
- Host city: Gotland, Sweden
- Venue: Rackethallen, Visby
- Level: Senior
- Participation: 17 nations

Badminton, for the 2017 Island Games, held at the Rackethallen, Visby, Gotland, Sweden in June 2017.

== Medal table ==
* Host nation (Gotland)

Rank	Nation	Gold	Silver	Bronze	Total
1	Guernsey	2	2	1	5
2	Isle of Man	2	0	1	3
3	Jersey	1	1	2	4
4	Menorca	1	0	0	1
5	Greenland	0	2	0	2
6	Gotland*	0	1	0	1
7	Faroe Islands	0	0	2	2
Totals (7 entries)		6	6	6	18

== Results ==
Event	Gold	Silver	Bronze
Men's singles	Mark Constable (JEY)	Jordan Trebert (GGY)	Alexander Hutchings (JEY)
Men's doubles	Menorca; Albert Navarro Comes; Eric Navarro Comes	Greenland; Bror Madsen; Jens-Frederik Nielsen	Jersey; Matthew Bignell; Alexander Hutchings
Women's singles	Jessica Li (IOM)	Sara Lindskov Jacobsen (GRL)	Rannvá Djurhuus Carlsson (FRO)
Women's doubles	Isle of Man; Kimberley Clague; Jessica Li	Gotland; Caroline Gate; Viktoria Olsson Meimermondt	Guernsey; Elena Johnson; Chloe Le Tissier
Mixed doubles	Guernsey; Elena Johnson; Ove Toennes Svejstrup	Guernsey; Chloe Le Tissier; Jordan Trebet	Faroe Islands; Rannvá Djurhuus Carlsson; Niklas Eysturoy
Team	Guernsey; Carys Batiste; Maxine Fitzgerald; Matthew Haynes; Elena Johnson; Kevin Le Moigne; Chloe Le Tissier; Paul Le Tocq; Ove Toennes Svejstrup; Emily Trebert; Jordan Trebert	Jersey; Matthew Bignell; Mark Constable; Elise Dixon; Marilisa Garnier; Cameron Ian Hunt; Alexander Hutchings; Natasha Hutchings; Harrison Morley; Emily Temple-Redshaw; Lindsey Woodward	Isle of Man; Alexandra Bell; Jonathan Callow; Kimberley Clague; Adam Colley; Neil Harding; Abigail Li; Jessica Li; Phillippa Li; Matthew Nicholson; Fingal Wattersson
