= Filip Budzel =

Czech badminton player (born 1996)

Personal information
- Born: 4 September 1996 (age 30)

Sport
- Country: Czech Republic
- Sport: Badminton
- Handedness: Right
- Coached by: Luděk Žídek

Mixed doubles
- Highest ranking: 174 (8 June 2017)
- BWF profile

Filip Budzel (born 4 September 1996) is a Czech badminton player from Sokol Klimkovice badminton club.

== Career ==
In May 2017, he became the mixed doubles runner-up in three BWF Future Series tournaments partnered with Tereza Švábíková. At the Czech International they were beaten by their compatriots Jakub Bitman and Alžběta Bášová. In Romania, they were defeated by the German pair, and in Latvia defeated by the French pair.

== Achievements ==
=== BWF International Challenge/Series ===
Mixed doubles
Year	Tournament	Partner	Opponent	Score	Result
2017	Czech International	(Czech Republic) Tereza Švábíková	(Czech Republic) Jakub Bitman (Czech Republic) Alžběta Bášová	19–21, 21–19, 17–21	(silver) Runner-up
2017	Romanian International	(Czech Republic) Tereza Švábíková	(Germany) Lukas Resch (Germany) Miranda Wilson	21–15, 16–21, 23–25	(silver) Runner-up
2017	Latvia International	(Czech Republic) Tereza Švábíková	(France) Fabien Delrue (France) Juliette Moinard	12–21, 21–19, 11–21	(silver) Runner-up
2017	Lithuanian International	(Czech Republic) Tereza Švábíková	(Republic of Ireland) Ciaran Chambers (Republic of Ireland) Sinead Chambers	21–17, 18–21, 18–21	(silver) Runner-up

BWF International Challenge tournament
BWF International Series tournament
BWF Future Series tournament
