= Alžběta Bášová =

Czech badminton player (born 1993)

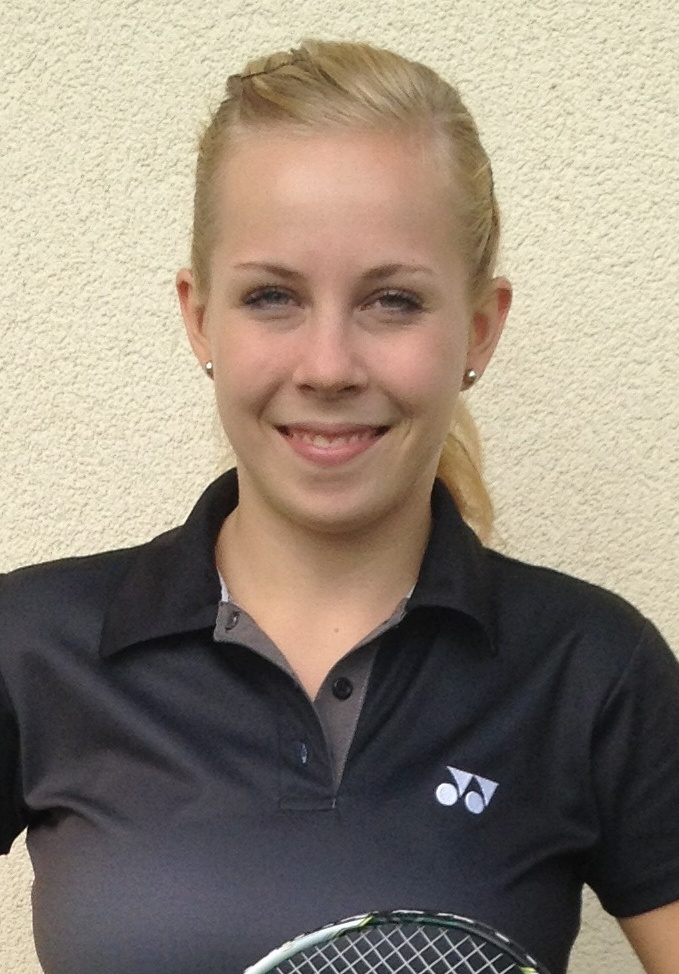
- Bášová in 2012

Personal information
- Born: 22 October 1993 (age 33) Hradec Králové, Czech Republic
- Height: 1.73 m (5 ft 8 in)
- Weight: 62 kg (137 lb)

Sport
- Country: Czech Republic
- Sport: Badminton
- Coached by: Petr Báša

Women's singles & doubles
- Highest ranking: 371 (WS 3 September 2015); 73 (WD 9 December 2010); 55 (XD 15 June 2017)
- BWF profile

Alžběta Bášová (born 22 October 1993) is a Czech badminton player. Her parents, Petr Báša and Ludmila Bášová, are also former badminton players.

== Achievements ==
=== BWF International Challenge/Series (8 titles, 5 runners-up) ===
Women's doubles
Year	Tournament	Partner	Opponent	Score	Result
2017	Slovak Open	(Czech Republic) Michaela Fuchsová	(Poland) Wiktoria Dąbczyńska (Poland) Aleksandra Goszczyńska	21–12, 21–10	(gold) Winner
2019	Czech Open	(Czech Republic) Michaela Fuchsová	(Germany) Lisa Kaminski (Germany) Hannah Pohl	21–23, 14–21	(silver) Runner-up

Mixed doubles
Year	Tournament	Partner	Opponent	Score	Result
2012	Slovak Open	(Czech Republic) Jakub Bitman	(Ukraine) Vitaly Konov (Ukraine) Yelyzaveta Zharka	12–21, 21–17, 21–19	(gold) Winner
2012	Hungarian International	(Czech Republic) Jakub Bitman	(Croatia) Zvonimir Đurkinjak (Croatia) Staša Poznanović	16–21, 18–21	(silver) Runner-up
2013	Slovak Open	(Czech Republic) Jakub Bitman	(Ukraine) Mykola Dmitrishin (Ukraine) Yelyzaveta Zharka	21–16, 22–20	(gold) Winner
2013	Czech International	(Czech Republic) Jakub Bitman	(Chinese Taipei) Wang Chi-lin (Chinese Taipei) Wu Ti-jung	19–21, 13–21	(silver) Runner-up
2014	Hungarian International	(Czech Republic) Jakub Bitman	(England) Ben Lane (England) Jessica Pugh	4–11, 10–11, 7–11	(silver) Runner-up
2016	Slovak Open	(Czech Republic) Jakub Bitman	(Slovenia) Miha Ivanič (Slovenia) Nika Arih	12–10, 11–4, 11–6	(gold) Winner
2017	KaBaL International Karviná	(Czech Republic) Jakub Bitman	(Czech Republic) Filip Budzel (Czech Republic) Tereza Švábíková	21–19, 19–21, 21–17	(gold) Winner
2018	Polish International	(Czech Republic) Jakub Bitman	(Poland) Paweł Śmiłowski (Poland) Magdalena Świerczyńska	21–17, 12–21, 21–14	(gold) Winner
2019	Czech Open	(Czech Republic) Jakub Bitman	(France) William Villeger (France) Sharone Bauer	21–15, 23–21	(gold) Winner
2020	Austrian Open	(Finland) Anton Kaisti	(Denmark) Jeppe Bay (Denmark) Sara Lundgaard	16–21, 13–21	(silver) Runner-up
2022	Swedish Open	(Finland) Anton Kaisti	(Denmark) Kristian Kræmer (Denmark) Amalie Cecilie Kudsk	21–19, 21–16	(gold) Winner

BWF International Challenge tournament
BWF International Series tournament
BWF Future Series tournament
