= Lavina Martins =

Kenyan badminton player (born 1993)

Lavina Sabastian Martins
Personal information
- Born: 3 February 1993 (age 33) Kisumu, Kenya
- Height: 1.67 m (5 ft 6 in)
- Weight: 50 kg (110 lb)

Sport
- Country: Kenya
- Sport: Badminton

Women's
- Highest ranking: 302 (WS) 5 Sep 2013; 196 (WD) 28 Jan 2016; 179 (XD) 19 Sep 2013
- BWF profile
Medal record
Badminton
Representing Kenya
All-Africa Games
Bronze medal – third place	2015 Brazzaville	Women's doubles

Lavina Sabastian Martins (born 3 February 1993) is a Kenyan badminton player. In 2015, she won the bronze medal at the African Games in women's doubles event. She also competed at the 2014 Commonwealth Games in Glasgow, Scotland.

== Achievements ==
=== All-Africa Games ===
Women's doubles
Year	Venue	Partner	Opponent	Score	Result
2015	Gymnase Étienne Mongha; Brazzaville, Republic of the Congo	(Kenya) Mercy Joseph	(Mauritius) Kate Foo Kune (Mauritius) Yeldy Marie Louison	10–21, 11–21	Bronze

=== BWF International Challenge/Series ===
Mixed doubles
Year	Tournament	Partner	Opponent	Score	Result
2013	Kenya International	(Kenya) Matheri Joseph Githitu	(Kenya) Patrick Kinyua Mbogo (Kenya) Mercy Joseph	8–21, 19–21	(silver) Runner-up

BWF International Challenge tournament
BWF International Series tournament
BWF Future Series tournament
