= Paul Le Tocq =

Guernsey badminton player (born 1981)

Personal information
- Born: Paul Andrew Le Tocq; 31 December 1981 (age 44) Guernsey

Sport
- Country: Guernsey; Wales
- Sport: Badminton
- Handedness: Right

Paul Le Tocq (born 31 December 1981) is a male badminton player from Guernsey.

== Career ==
Le Tocq has played both for Wales in the BWF Circuit and the European Circuit, and for Guernsey in some international tournaments such as the Island Games. He also competed for Guernsey in mixed doubles at the 2006 Commonwealth Games.

== Major achievements ==
Outcome	Event	Year	Partner
Island Games
1	MD	2001	Glenn MacFarlane
1	XD	2011	Sarah Garbutt
1	Team	2011	Guernsey
2	MD	2011	Kevin Le Moigne
3	MS	2011	
Welsh National Champs
1	MS	2005	
1	XD	2006	Kate Ridler
