= Robin Middleton =

Robin Middleton may refer to:

- Robin Middleton (badminton) (born 1985), British badminton player
- Robin Middleton (architectural historian) (1931–2026), British architectural historian
