= Mercy Joseph =

Kenyan badminton player (born 1992)

Personal information
- Born: Mercy Mwethya Joseph; 21 March 1992 (age 34) Nairobi, Kenya
- Height: 1.67 m (5 ft 6 in)
- Weight: 52 kg (115 lb)

Sport
- Country: Kenya
- Sport: Badminton

Women's singles & doubles
- Highest ranking: 301 (WS 23 January 2014); 196 (WD 28 January 2016); 160 (XD 26 September 2013)
- BWF profile
Medal record
Women's badminton
Representing Kenya
All-Africa Games
Bronze medal – third place	2015 Brazzaville	Women's doubles

Mercy Mwethya Joseph (born 21 March 1992) is a Kenyan badminton player. She was selected among the 14 best African players to be a member of the Road to Rio Program organised by the BWF and Badminton Confederation of Africa, to provide financial and technical support to African players and the lead-up to the 2016 Olympic Games in Rio de Janeiro. She was the women's doubles bronze medallist at the 2015 All-Africa Games, and has competed at the 2010, 2014, and 2018 Commonwealth Games.

== Achievements ==
=== All-Africa Games ===
Women's doubles
Year	Venue	Partner	Opponent	Score	Result
2015	Gymnase Étienne Mongha; Brazzaville, Republic of the Congo	(Kenya) Lavina Martins	(Mauritius) Kate Foo Kune (Mauritius) Yeldy Marie Louison	10–21, 11–21	Bronze

=== BWF International Challenge/Series (1 title, 2 runners-up) ===
Mixed doubles
Year	Tournament	Partner	Opponent	Score	Result
2020	Kenya International	(Kenya) John Wanyoike	(Egypt) Adham Hatem Elgamal (Egypt) Doha Hany	10–21, 14–21	(silver) Runner-up
2014	Kenya International	(Kenya) Patrick Kinyua Mbogo	(Zambia) Donald Mabo (Zambia) Ogar Siamupangila	21–4, 21–23, 16–21	(silver) Runner-up
2013	Kenya International	(Kenya) Patrick Kinyua Mbogo	(Kenya) Matheri Joseph Githitu (Kenya) Lavina Martins	21–8, 21–19	(gold) Winner

BWF International Challenge tournament
BWF International Series tournament
BWF Future Series tournament
