= Patrick Kinyua Mbogo =

Kenyan badminton player (born 1982)

Patrick Kìnyua Mbogo
Personal information
- Born: 6 June 1982 (age 44) Kirinyaga, Kenya
- Height: 1.67 m (5 ft 6 in)
- Weight: 64 kg (141 lb)

Sport
- Country: Kenya
- Sport: Badminton

Men's
- Highest ranking: 364 (MS) 3 Sep 2013; 363 (MD) 22 Oct 2009; 160 (XD) 26 Sep 2013
- BWF profile

Patrick Kìnyua Mbogo (born 6 June 1982) is a Kenyan male badminton player.

== Achievements ==
=== BWF International Challenge/Series ===
Mixed Doubles
Year	Tournament	Partner	Opponent	Score	Result
2014	Kenya International	(Kenya) Mercy Joseph	(Zambia) Donald Mabo (Zambia) Ogar Siamupangila	21-4, 21–23, 16–21	(silver) Runner-up
2013	Kenya International	(Kenya) Mercy Joseph	(Kenya) Matheri Joseph Githitu (Kenya) Lavina Martins	21-8, 21–19	(gold) Winner

BWF International Challenge tournament
BWF International Series tournament
BWF Future Series tournament
