= Kieran Merrilees =

Scottish badminton player (born 1989)

Personal information
- Born: 12 September 1989 (age 37) Glasgow, Scotland
- Years active: 2006
- Height: 1.81 m (5 ft 11 in)
- Weight: 73 kg (161 lb)

Sport
- Country: Scotland
- Sport: Badminton
- Handedness: Right
- Coached by: Wong Tat Meng; Andrew Bowman

Men's singles
- Highest ranking: 52 (8 December 2016)
- Current ranking: 110 (12 April 2018)
- BWF profile

Kieran Merrilees (born 12 September 1989) is a Scottish badminton player from BC Adliswil Zurich. He represented his country at the 2010, 2014, and 2018 Commonwealth Games. Merrilees educated retail management and marketing at the Open University, Scotland.

== Achievements ==
=== BWF International Challenge/Series ===
Men's singles
Year	Tournament	Opponent	Score	Result
2016	Welsh International	(Spain) Pablo Abián	16–21, 16–21	(silver) Runner-up
2016	Slovenia International	(Indonesia) Adi Pratama	21–14, 21–16	(gold) Winner
2016	Dutch International	(Spain) Pablo Abián	16–21, 15–21	(silver) Runner-up
2014	Welsh International	(England) Toby Penty	21–15, 21–10	(gold) Winner
2012	Polish International	(England) Toby Penty	21–10, 21–8	(gold) Winner
2009	Bulgarian International	(Denmark) Rune Ulsing	10–21, 22–20, 5–21	(silver) Runner-up
2008	Welsh International	(France) Brice Leverdez	15–21, 21–18, 19–21	(silver) Runner-up

BWF International Challenge tournament
BWF International Series tournament
BWF Future Series tournament
