= Ciaran Chambers =

Irish badminton player (born 1994)

Personal information
- Born: Ciarán Brian Chambers; 4 February 1994 (age 32) Belfast, Northern Ireland

Sport
- Sport: Badminton
- Coached by: Andrew Stewart

Men's & mixed doubles
- Highest ranking: 186 (MD 7 December 2017); 141 (XD 17 July 2014)
- BWF profile

Ciarán Brian Chambers (born 4 February 1994) is a badminton player from Belfast who represented Northern Ireland at two Commonwealth Games.

== Biography ==
Chambers studied sport and exercise science at Ulster University.

Chambers competed for Northern Ireland at the 2014 Commonwealth Games in Glasgow, Scotland and 2018 Commonwealth Games in Gold Coast, Australia.

Chambers became an Irish champion at the Irish National Badminton Championships, when winning the 2018 Irish mixed doubles title with his sister Sinead Chambers.

== Achievements ==
=== BWF International Challenge/Series ===
Mixed doubles
Year	Tournament	Partner	Opponent	Score	Result
2017	Lithuanian International	(Republic of Ireland) Sinead Chambers	(Czech Republic) Filip Budzel (Czech Republic) Tereza Švábíková	17–21, 21–18, 21–18	(gold) Winner
2014	Lithuanian International	(Republic of Ireland) Sinead Chambers	(Poland) Pawel Pietryja (Poland) Aneta Wojtkowska	11–21, 13–21	(silver) Runner-up

BWF International Challenge tournament
BWF International Series tournament
BWF Future Series tournament
