= Sinead Chambers =

Irish badminton player

Personal information
- Born: 1 February 1992 (age 34) Belfast, Northern Ireland

Sport
- Sport: Badminton
- Club: Alpha Club, Lisburn

Women's singles & doubles
- Highest ranking: 163 (WS 11 July 2013); 100 (WD 3 July 2014); 126 (XD 20 September 2012)
- BWF profile

Sinead Chambers (born 1 February 1992) is a former badminton player who competed for Northern Ireland at three Commonwealth Games and is an eight-times champion of Ireland.

== Biography ==
Chambers' first Irish national senior cap arrived during the 2008 Uber Cup. Chambers represented Northern Ireland at the Commonwealth Games at the 2010 Games in Delhi, India, the 2014 Games in Glasgow and the 2018 Games in Gold Coast. She was the champion at the 2012 Irish Future Series tournament in the women's doubles event with her partner Jennie King and became the runner-up in the singles event.

Chambers was an eight-time Irish champion at the Irish National Badminton Championships, winning the Irish women's doubles title seven times (six with Jennie King and one with Caroline Black) and the mixed doubles once with her brother Ciaran Chambers.

Chambers graduated from the Ulster University with a first class honours in Physiotherapy and became a members of Chartered Society of Physiotherapy, Health and Care Professions Council, and Association of Chartered Physiotherapists in Sports & Exercise Medicines.

== Achievements ==
=== BWF International Challenge/Series ===
Women's singles
Year	Tournament	Opponent	Score	Result
2012	Irish International	(France) Perrine Le Buhanic	17–21, 17–21	(silver) Runner-up

Women's doubles
Year	Tournament	Partner	Opponent	Score	Result
2012	Irish International	(Republic of Ireland) Jennie King	(Republic of Ireland) Rachael Darragh (Republic of Ireland) Alannah Stephenson	21–18, 21–14	(gold) Winner

Mixed doubles
Year	Tournament	Partner	Opponent	Score	Result
2017	Lithuanian International	(Republic of Ireland) Ciaran Chambers	(Czech Republic) Filip Budzel (Czech Republic) Tereza Švábíková	17–21, 21–18, 21–18	(gold) Winner
2014	Lithuanian International	(Republic of Ireland) Ciaran Chambers	(Poland) Pawel Pietryja (Poland) Aneta Wojtkowska	11–21, 13–21	(silver) Runner-up
2011	Iceland International	(Republic of Ireland) Tony Stephenson	(Denmark) Thomas Dew-Hattens (Denmark) Louise Hansen	21–23, 13–21	(silver) Runner-up

BWF International Challenge tournament
BWF International Series tournament
BWF Future Series tournament
