= Caroline Black (badminton) =

Irish badminton player (born 1994)

Personal information
- Nationality: British (Northern Irish)
- Born: 4 March 1994 (age 32) Lisburn, Northern Ireland

Sport
- Sport: Badminton
- Club: Alpha Club, Lisburn

Women's
- Highest ranking: 831 (WS) 6 Sep 2012; 100 (WD) 3 Jul 2014; 234 (XD)5 Dec 2013
- BWF profile
Medal record
Representing Northern Ireland
Irish Nationals
Gold medal – first place	2014	women's doubles

Caroline Black (born 4 March 1994) is a female former badminton player who represented Northern Ireland at two Commonwealth Games.

== Biography ==
In 2012, she became the runner-up of the Irish Future Series tournament in the mixed doubles event with her partner Stuart Lightbody.

In September 2010, Black was a late replacement for Emma Callow as part of the Northern Irish 2010 team at the 2010 Commonwealth Games in Delhi, India.

In 2014, she competed at the Commonwealth Games in Glasgow, Scotland representing Northern Ireland. Also in 2014, she won the Irish women's doubles title at the Irish National Badminton Championships, partnering Sinead Chambers.
