= 2026 BWF Continental Circuit =

Tournament details
- Dates: 6 January – 13 December
- Edition: 20th

The 2026 BWF Continental Circuit is a series of Grade 3 badminton tournaments in 2026 organized by each continental confederation under the auspices of the BWF. The circuit consists of 95 tournaments, which are divided into three levels:

- International Challenge (39 tournaments)
- International Series (28 tournaments)
- Future Series (28 tournaments).

Each of these tournaments offers different ranking points and prize money.

== Points distribution ==
Below is the point distribution table for each phase of the tournament based on the BWF points system for the BWF Continental Circuit events.

| Tournament | Winner | Runner-up | 3/4 | 5/8 | 9/16 | 17/32 | 33/64 | 65/128 | 129/256 |
|---|---|---|---|---|---|---|---|---|---|
| International Challenge | 4,000 | 3,400 | 2,800 | 2,200 | 1,520 | 920 | 360 | 170 | 70 |
| International Series | 2,500 | 2,130 | 1,750 | 1,370 | 920 | 550 | 210 | 100 | 40 |
| Future Series | 1,700 | 1,420 | 1,170 | 920 | 600 | 350 | 130 | 60 | 20 |

== Results ==
Below is the schedule released by Badminton World Federation:

=== Winners ===
==== International Challenge ====
| Tour | Men's singles | Women's singles | Men's doubles | Women's doubles | Mixed doubles |
|---|---|---|---|---|---|
| 34th Iran Fajr International Challenge 2026 | Cancelled | | | | |
| Azerbaijan International 2026 | (Poland) Dominik Kwinta | (India) Devika Sihag | (England) Alex Green (England) Zach Russ | (Japan) Miku Sugiyama (Japan) Natsumi Takasaki | (India) Sathwik Reddy Kanapuram (India) Radhika Sharma |
| Uganda International Challenge 2026 | (Australia) Karono | (India) Anupama Upadhyaya | (India) Bhargav Arigela (India) Vishwatej Gobburu | (United States) Lauren Lam (United States) Allison Lee | (India) Ishaan Bhatnagar (India) Shruti Mishra |
| SBH Singapore International Challenge 2026 | (Chinese Taipei) Wu Zhe-ying | (Malaysia) Goh Jin Wei | (Indonesia) Taufik Aderya (Indonesia) Daniel Edgar Marvino | (South Korea) Jung Kyung-eun (South Korea) Kim So-yeong | (Japan) Yuta Watanabe (Japan) Maya Taguchi |
| Sri Lanka International Challenge 2026 | Cancelled | | | | |
| (Poland) Polish Open 2026 presented by YONEX | (Singapore) Jason Teh | (India) Unnati Hooda | (Germany) Malik Bourakkadi (Germany) Kenneth Neumann | (England) Abbygael Harris (England) Lizzie Tolman | (Japan) Hiroki Midorikawa (Japan) Nami Matsuyama |
| CIPUTRA HANOI - YONEX SUNRISE Vietnam International Challenge 2026 | (Indonesia) Richie Duta Richardo | (India) Rakshitha Ramraj | (Chinese Taipei) Huang Tsung-i (Chinese Taipei) Lin Ting-yu | (Australia) Gronya Somerville (Canada) Josephine Wu | (Hong Kong) Chan Yin Chak (Hong Kong) Ng Tsz Yau |
| Brazil International Challenge 2026 | (Brazil) Jonathan Matias | (Brazil) Juliana Viana Vieira | (Japan) Takuto Goto (Japan) Yuta Oku | (Brazil) Jaqueline Lima (Brazil) Sâmia Lima | (Brazil) Davi Silva (Brazil) Sânia Lima |
| (Mexico) VI Mexican International Challenge 2026 | (Brazil) Jonathan Matias | (India) Shriyanshi Valishetty | (India) Krishna Prasad Garaga (India) Pruthvi Roy | (Japan) Rui Kiyama (Japan) Sona Yonemoto | (Brazil) Davi Silva (Brazil) Sânia Lima |
| (Réunion) SAINT DENIS Reunion Open 2026 | (India) Rounak Chouhan | (India) Tasnim Mir | (India) Krishna Prasad Garaga (India) Pruthvi Roy | (Canada) Jackie Dent (Canada) Crystal Lai | (India) Ishaan Bhatnagar (India) Shruti Mishra |
| STATE Denmark Challenge 2026 presented by RSL | (Israel) Daniil Dubovenko | (Germany) Yvonne Li | (Denmark) Christian Faust Kjær (Denmark) Rasmus Kjær | (Japan) Miku Sugiyama (Japan) Nana Takahashi | (England) Callum Hemming (England) Estelle van Leeuwen |
| (Thailand) TOYOTA Phuket International Challenge 2026 | (Japan) Rei Miyashita | (Thailand) Thamonwan Nithiittikrai | (Indonesia) M. Nawaf Khoiriyansyah (Indonesia) Adrian Pratama | (Thailand) Phattharin Aiamvareesrisakul (Thailand) Sarisa Janpeng | (Thailand) Ratchapol Makkasasithorn (Thailand) Nattamon Laisuan |
| (France) Valence Alpes International 2026 presented by FZ FORZA | (India) Rithvik Sanjeevi | (France) Anna Tatranova | (France) Maël Cattoen (France) William Villeger | (England) Abbygael Harris (England) Estelle van Leeuwen | (France) Natan Begga (France) Elsa Jacob |
| (Northern Mariana Islands) YONEX Northern Marianas Open 2026 | (South Korea) Park Sang-yong | (Japan) Sakura Masuki | (Japan) Tori Aizawa (Japan) Daisuke Sano | (South Korea) Moon In-seo (South Korea) Park Seul | (South Korea) Lee Hyeong-woo (South Korea) Park Seul |
| (Northern Mariana Islands) CROWNE PLAZA Saipan International 2026 | (Japan) Shogo Ogawa | (Japan) Sakura Masuki | (Chinese Taipei) Wei Chun-wei (Chinese Taipei) Yang Po-chih | (Japan) Mio Konegawa (Japan) An Uesugi | (South Korea) Jo Song-hyun (South Korea) Jeong Na-eun |
| (Philippines) Philippine International Challenge 2026 | (India) Ginpaul Sonna | (Thailand) Sarunrak Vitidsarn | (Malaysia) Choong Hon Jian (Malaysia) Wong Vin Sean | (India) Treesa Jolly (India) Gayatri Gopichand | (Malaysia) Goh Boon Zhe (Malaysia) Dania Sofea |
| PETRONAS Malaysia International Challenge 2026 | (Japan) Shogo Ogawa | (Thailand) Sarunrak Vitidsarn | (Japan) Naoya Kawashima (Japan) Kota Ogawa | (Japan) Mikoto Aiso (Japan) Momoha Niimi | (Japan) Kota Ogawa (Japan) Misaki Kurashima |
| ANTICA Singapore International Challenge 2026 | (Japan) Riku Hatano | (Japan) Manami Suizu | (Japan) Takuto Goto (Japan) Tsubasa Yoshida | (Japan) Himeka Hashimura (Japan) Mao Yamakita | (Japan) Mutsuki Ampo (Japan) Hina Osawa |
| (Indonesia) POLYTRON Pontianak International Challenge 2026 | (Indonesia) Richie Duta Richardo | (India) Tanvi Patri | (Indonesia) Wahyu Agung Prasetyo (Indonesia) Pulung Ramadhan | (South Korea) Kim Yu-jung (South Korea) Lee Yu-lim | (Indonesia) Dejan Ferdinansyah (Indonesia) Apriyani Rahayu |
| (Nigeria) Lagos International Classics 2026 | (India) Tankara Gnana Dattu Talasila | (United Arab Emirates) Prakriti Bharath | (Thailand) Thanawin Madee (Thailand) Pongsakorn Thongkham | (India) Rutaparna Panda (India) Swetaparna Panda | (India) Dhruv Rawat (India) K. Maneesha |
| Cameroon International 2026 | (India) Hmar Lalthazuala | (Azerbaijan) Keisha Fatimah Azzahra | (Thailand) Thanawin Madee (Thailand) Pongsakorn Thongkham | (India) Kavipriya Selvam (India) Simran Singhi | (India) Dhruv Rawat (India) K. Maneesha |
| (Belgium) YONEX Belgian International 2026 | (Denmark) Karan Rajan | (Scotland) Kirsty Gilmour | (Scotland) Christopher Grimley (Scotland) Matthew Grimley | (Denmark) Amalie Cecilie Kudsk (Denmark) Simona Pilgaard | (Denmark) Jeppe Søby (Denmark) Sofie Røjkjær |
| (Indonesia) POLYTRON Surabaya International Challenge 2026 | (Indonesia) Bismo Raya Oktora | (Japan) Sakura Masuki | (Indonesia) Taufik Aderya (Indonesia) Alexius Ongkytama Subagio | (Japan) Mikoto Aiso (Japan) Momoha Niimi | (Indonesia) Rehan Naufal Kusharjanto (Indonesia) Melati Daeva Oktavianti |
| Guatemala International Challenge 2026 | (Brazil) Jonathan Matias | (Brazil) Juliana Viana Vieira | (Canada) Kevin Lee (Canada) Ty Alexander Lindeman | (Brazil) Sânia Lima (Brazil) Juliana Viana Vieira | (Canada) Timothy Lock (Canada) Chloe Hoang |
| (New Zealand) MAXX North Harbour International 2026 | (Japan) Rei Miyashita | (Chinese Taipei) Tung Ciou-tong | (Chinese Taipei) Chiu Shao-hua (Chinese Taipei) Lin Bing-wei | (Chinese Taipei) Hsieh Mi-yen (Chinese Taipei) Yu Chien-hui | (Australia) Andika Ramadiansyah (Australia) Nozomi Shimizu |
| (Netherlands) YONEX Dutch Open 2026 | (Chinese Taipei) Su Li-yang | (Germany) Yvonne Li | (Scotland) Christopher Grimley (Scotland) Matthew Grimley | (Germany) Stine Küspert (Germany) Isabel Lohau | (Denmark) Jeppe Søby (Denmark) Sofie Røjkjær |
| (Turkey) NAVEK Türkiye International Challenge 2026 | (Denmark) Victor Ørding Kauffmann | (India) Anmol Kharb | (Denmark) William Kryger Boe (Denmark) Rasmus Espersen | (Japan) Mao Hatasue (Japan) Kanano Muroya | (France) Natan Begga (France) Elsa Jacob |
| (Australia) YONEX Bendigo International 2026 | (Chinese Taipei) Liao Jhuo-fu | (Chinese Taipei) Liao Jui-chi | (Chinese Taipei) Chiu Shao-hua (Chinese Taipei) Lin Bing-wei | (Chinese Taipei) Liao Jui-chi (Chinese Taipei) Lin Yen-yu | (Australia) Andika Ramadiansyah (Australia) Nozomi Shimizu |
| (United States) Arise International Challenge 2026 | (Indonesia) Muhammad Reza Al Fajri | (Chinese Taipei) Huang Ching-ping | (Canada) Kevin Lee (Canada) Ty Alexander Lindeman | (Canada) Jackie Dent (Canada) Crystal Lai | (Brazil) Davi Silva (Brazil) Sânia Lima |
| (Australia) ROKETTO Sydney International 2026 | (Australia) Muhammad Rafi Zafran Ferary | (Chinese Taipei) Chen Su-yu | (Philippines) Solomon Padiz Jr. (Philippines) Julius Villabrille | (Japan) Arisa Ishida (Japan) Akari Sato | (Chinese Taipei) Lu Chen (Chinese Taipei) Chang Yun-jung |
| (Czech Republic) YONEX BYD Czech Open 2026 | (Finland) Joakim Oldorff | (Chinese Taipei) Sung Shuo-yun | (England) Alex Green (England) Zach Russ | (Germany) Stine Küspert (Germany) Isabel Lohau | (Denmark) Jesper Toft (Denmark) Amalie Cecilie Kudsk |
| Peru International Challenge 2026 | (Croatia) Aria Dinata | (United States) Ella Lin | (Brazil) Fabrício Farias (Brazil) Davi Silva | (Canada) Jackie Dent (Canada) Crystal Lai | (Algeria) Koceila Mammeri (Algeria) Tanina Mammeri |
| KBA DIAMOND JUBILEE India International Challenge 2026 | (India) Sathish Karunakaran | (Thailand) Yataweemin Ketklieng | (India) Sai Pratheek K. (India) Ruban Kumar | (Japan) Mei Sudo (Japan) Mai Tanabe | (Individual Neutral Athletes) Rodion Alimov (Individual Neutral Athletes) Alina Davletova |
| Telangana India International Challenge 2026 | (India) Tushar Suveer | (India) Rakshitha Ramraj | (India) Krishna Prasad Garaga (India) Pruthvi Roy | (Japan) Mei Sudo (Japan) Mai Tanabe | (Individual Neutral Athletes) Rodion Alimov (Individual Neutral Athletes) Alina Davletova |
| WANG WENJIAO CUP Nan'an China International Challenge 2026 | (China) Sun Chao | (China) Chen Xintong | (China) Chen Junting (China) Huang Di | (China) Liu Jiayue (China) Wang Zimeng | (China) Liao Pinyi (China) Zhang Jiahan |
| (Republic of Ireland) AIG VICTOR Irish Open 2026 | (Denmark) Victor Ørding Kauffmann | (South Korea) Kim Min-ji | (South Korea) Jin Sung-ik (South Korea) Lee Hyeong-woo | (South Korea) Lee Seung-hee (South Korea) Park Min-ji | (Denmark) Jesper Toft (Denmark) Amalie Cecilie Kudsk |
| (Indonesia) POLYTRON Yogyakarta International Challenge 2026 | (Indonesia) Muhammad Rizky Akbar | (Malaysia) Oo Shan Zi | (Chinese Taipei) Chiu Shao-hua (Chinese Taipei) Lin Bing-wei | (Indonesia) Lanny Tria Mayasari (Indonesia) Ester Nurumi Tri Wardoyo | (Indonesia) Muhammad Al Farizi (Indonesia) Jessica Maya Rismawardani |
| (Scotland) Scottish Open 2026 | | (South Korea) | | | (Denmark) (Denmark) |
| (Thailand) TOYOTA International Challenge 2026 | | | | | |
| (Canada) 2026 YONEX Canadian International Challenge | | | | | |
| YONEX SUNRISE Bangladesh International Challenge 2026 | | | | | |

==== International Series ====
| Tour | Men's singles | Women's singles | Men's doubles | Women's doubles | Mixed doubles |
|---|---|---|---|---|---|
| (Estonia) YONEX Estonian International 2026 | (Japan) Minoru Koga | (India) Rujula Ramu | (Denmark) Christian Faust Kjær (Denmark) Rasmus Kjær | (Malaysia) Low Zi Yu (Malaysia) Noraqilah Maisarah | (Germany) Jonathan Dresp (Germany) Selin Hübsch |
| (Sweden) VICTOR Swedish Open 2026 hosted by PONG | (Japan) Minoru Koga | (India) Rujula Ramu | (England) Oliver Butler (England) Samuel Jones | (Denmark) Simona Pilgaard (Denmark) Signe Schulz | (Malaysia) Loo Bing Kun (Malaysia) Noraqilah Maisarah |
| SBH Singapore International Series 2026 | (Thailand) Wongsup Wongsup-in | (Thailand) Yataweemin Ketklieng | (Indonesia) Erwin Rendana Purnomo (Indonesia) Ade Yusuf Santoso | (Chinese Taipei) Hsieh Mi-yen (Chinese Taipei) Yu Chien-hui | (Indonesia) Muhammad Al Farizi (Indonesia) Jessica Maya Rismawardani |
| 61st Portugal International Championships 2026 | (Denmark) Jeppe Bruun | (Brazil) Juliana Viana Vieira | (Denmark) Robert Nebel (Denmark) Jeppe Søby | (Chinese Taipei) Lin Chih-chun (Chinese Taipei) Yang Chu-yun | (Chinese Taipei) Wu Hsuan-yi (Chinese Taipei) Yang Chu-yun |
| Sri Lanka International Series 2026 | Cancelled | | | | |
| Cuba International Series 2026 | (India) Nithin Raghavendar | (United States) Ishika Jaiswal | (Mexico) Nestor González (Mexico) Juan Pablo Montoya | (Cuba) Leyanis Contreras (Cuba) Taymara Oropesa | (Cuba) Roberto Herrera (Cuba) Taymara Oropesa |
| YONEX Luxembourg Open 2026 | (Japan) Akira Hanada | (Czech Republic) Petra Maixnerová | (Japan) Shuntaro Mezaki (Japan) Yuta Oku | (Individual Neutral Athletes) Anastasiia Boiarun (Individual Neutral Athletes) Daria Kharlampovich | (Denmark) Jeppe Søby (Denmark) Sofie Røjkjær |
| (Slovenia) I FEEL SLOVENIA LI-NING Open 2026 | (India) Sathish Karunakaran | (India) Ilishaa Pal | (Denmark) Robert Nebel (Denmark) Jeppe Søby | (Netherlands) Debora Jille (Netherlands) Meerte Loos | (India) Sathish Karunakaran (India) Zenith Abbigail |
| (Austria) Austrian Open 2026 | (Chinese Taipei) Yang Chieh-dan | (Canada) Rachel Chan | (Germany) Malik Bourakkadi (Germany) Kenneth Neumann | (Chinese Taipei) Hsieh Chih-ying (Chinese Taipei) Lee Yu-hsuan | (Germany) Jan Colin Völker (Germany) Emma Moszczynski |
| (Italy) YONEX Italian Open 2026 | (Denmark) Karan Rajan | (United Arab Emirates) Prakriti Bharath | (Germany) Danial Marzuan (Germany) Aaron Sonnenschein | (England) Lisa Curtin (England) Yulia Tang | (Germany) Jan Colin Völker (Germany) Emma Moszczynski |
| (Peru) Perú International Series 2026 | (Italy) Giovanni Toti | (Switzerland) Jenjira Stadelmann | (United States) Ryan Nibu (United States) Joshua Yang | (Guatemala) Diana Corleto (Guatemala) Nikté Sotomayor | (Guatemala) Christopher Martínez (Guatemala) Diana Corleto |
| Jamaica International 2026 | (Switzerland) Julien Scheiwiller | (Peru) Inés Castillo | (India) Sai Pratheek K. (India) Ruban Kumar | (United States) Sydney Li (United States) Katelin Ngo | (Jamaica) Joel Angus (Jamaica) Tahlia Richardson |
| JE WILSON Ghana International 2026 | (United Arab Emirates) Riyan Malhan | (United Arab Emirates) Nurani Ratu Azzahra | (India) Abhyuday Choudhary (India) Ayush Makhija | (Ghana) Moslena Adu (Ghana) Rachael Quarcoo | (United Arab Emirates) Shashaank Sai Munnangi (Australia) Supriya Yellapragada |
| LI-NING Vietnam International Series 2026 | (India) Dhruv Negi | (Thailand) Tidapron Kleebyeesun | (South Korea) Choi Sol-gyu (South Korea) Lim Su-min | (Thailand) Tidapron Kleebyeesun (Thailand) Nattamon Laisuan | (South Korea) Lim Su-min (South Korea) Kim Hye-rin |
| PETRONAS Malaysia International Series 2026 | (Malaysia) Danial Razeeq | (Thailand) Anyapat Phichitpreechasak | (Malaysia) Lau Yi Sheng (Malaysia) Lee Yi Bo | (Chinese Taipei) Hsieh Mi-yen (Chinese Taipei) Yu Chien-hui | (Malaysia) Irfan Shazmir (Malaysia) Genevie Lim |
| (Thailand) TOYOTA Nakhon Sawan International Series 2026 | (Japan) Koya Iwano | (Chinese Taipei) Su Xiao-ting | (Thailand) Thanawin Madee (Thailand) Pongsakorn Thongkham | (South Korea) Jang Min-yoon (South Korea) Kim Bo-min | (Thailand) Ratchapol Makkasasithorn (Thailand) Patida Srisawat |
| (Poland) Polish International 2026 presented by YONEX | (South Korea) Choi Pyeong-gang | (Republic of Ireland) Sophia Noble | (Spain) Jacobo Fernández (Spain) Alberto Perals | (Chinese Taipei) Chen Hsin-tung (Chinese Taipei) Chen Yu-hsi | (Netherlands) Andy Buijk (Netherlands) Meerte Loos |
| Senegal International 2026 | (Iran) Ali Hayati | (Czech Republic) Tereza Švábíková | (Ukraine) Vladyslav Kunin (Ukraine) Yegor Romaniuk | (Senegal) Maryame Cisse (Senegal) Yandé Sene | (Ukraine) Yegor Romaniuk (Poland) Kaja Ziółkowska |
| III Venezuela International Series 2026 | Cancelled | | | | |
| Uganda International Series 2026 | (Myanmar) Hein Htut | (India) Aesha Gandhi | (Malaysia) Hafiz Hakimi Hashim (Malaysia) Wong Meng Fong | (India) Akshita Manral (India) Ishita Negi | (Malaysia) Hafiz Hakimi Hashim (Malaysia) Lim Xuan |
| (Dominican Republic) XV Santo Domingo Open 2026 | (Germany) Matthias Kicklitz | (Japan) Nayu Shirakawa | (Brazil) Izak Batalha (Brazil) Matheus Voigt | (Chinese Taipei) Hsieh Chih-ying (Chinese Taipei) Lee Yu-hsuan | (Germany) Justin Seibel (Germany) Miranda Wilson |
| (Mexico) XVII Mexican International 2026 | (United States) Jay Chun | (Chinese Taipei) Lee Yu-hsuan | (Mexico) Armando Gaitan (Mexico) Juan Torres | (Chinese Taipei) Hsieh Chih-ying (Chinese Taipei) Lee Yu-hsuan | (Mexico) Luis Montoya (Mexico) Miriam Rodríguez |
| (Hungary) 51th VICTOR FZ FORZA Hungarian International Championships 2026 | (Denmark) Mathias Solgaard | (Switzerland) Milena Schnider | (Serbia) Viktor Petrovic (Serbia) Mihajlo Tomić | (Germany) Leona Michalski (Denmark) Signe Schulz | (Serbia) Mihajlo Tomić (Serbia) Anđela Vitman |
| XVII Suriname International 2026 | (Azerbaijan) Ade Resky Dwicahyo | (Azerbaijan) Keisha Fatimah Azzahra | (Azerbaijan) Ade Resky Dwicahyo (Azerbaijan) Dicky Dwi Pangestu | (Peru) Naomi Junco (Peru) Namie Miyahira | (Azerbaijan) Dicky Dwi Pangestu (Azerbaijan) Keisha Fatimah Azzahra |
| YONEX South Australia International 2026 | (Australia) Karono | (South Korea) Kim Do-yeon | (South Korea) Cheon Ji-min (South Korea) Park Seung-min | (South Korea) Kim So-hee (South Korea) Yeon Seo-yeon | (South Korea) Park Seung-min (South Korea) Yeon Seo-yeon |
| Zambia International 2026 | (India) Manav Choudhary | (Myanmar) Thet Htar Thuzar | (United Arab Emirates) Bharath Latheesh (United Arab Emirates) Dev Vishnu | (South Africa) Amy Ackerman (South Africa) Johanita Scholtz | (Slovenia) Miha Ivančič (Slovenia) Anja Jordan |
| Guatemala International Series 2026 | | | | | |
| (Wales) YONEX Welsh International Open 2026 | | | | | |
| FELET Vietnam International Series 2026 | | | | | |
| Algeria International 2026 | | | | | |
| (United States) YONEX LA International Series 2026 | | | | | |
| Egypt International 2026 | | | | | |
| Azerbaijan Caspian Cup 2026 | Cancelled | | | | |
| YONEX SUNRISE Bangladesh International Series 2026 | | | | | |

==== Future Series ====
| Tour | Men's singles | Women's singles | Men's doubles | Women's doubles | Mixed doubles |
|---|---|---|---|---|---|
| RSL Iceland International 2026 | (Denmark) Mikkel Langemark | (Chinese Taipei) Huang Sheng-chun | (France) Baptiste Labarthe (France) Quentin Ronget | (Individual Neutral Athletes) Anastasiia Boiarun (Individual Neutral Athletes) Daria Kharlampovich | (Switzerland) Yann Orteu (Switzerland) Caroline Racloz |
| (Cuba) XXIV International Giraldilla 2026 | (El Salvador) Uriel Canjura | (Cuba) Taymara Oropesa | (United States) Kathiravun Manivannan (United States) Mukil Nambikumar | (Dominican Republic) Clarisa Pie (Dominican Republic) Nairoby Abigail Jiménez | (Cuba) Roberto Herrera (Cuba) Taymara Oropesa |
| (Hungary) 1st Hungarian Future Series 2026 presented by VICTOR | (Denmark) Christopher Vittoriani | (Bulgaria) Hristomira Popovska | (Denmark) Sebastian Mønster Andersen (Denmark) Birk Norman | (Denmark) Anne Fuglsang (Denmark) Laura Fløj Thomsen | (Germany) Jan Colin Völker (Germany) Emma Moszczynski |
| Malta International 2026 presented by VICTOR | (Poland) Dominik Kwinta | (United Arab Emirates) Prakriti Bharath | (England) Robin Harper (England) Harry Wakefield | (Republic of Ireland) Orla Flynn (Republic of Ireland) Siofra Flynn | (United Arab Emirates) Dhiren Ayyappan (United Arab Emirates) Taabia Khan |
| (Finland) YONEX Finnish International 2026 | (Japan) Hyuga Takano | (Japan) Yuzuno Watanabe | (Sweden) Jakob Ekman (Sweden) Oscar Reuterhäll | (Estonia) Catlyn Kruus (Estonia) Ramona Üprus | (Finland) Anton Kaisti (Finland) Iina Suutarinen |
| (Peru) Perú Future Series 2026 | (Canada) Xiaodong Sheng | (Peru) Inés Castillo | (Canada) Jason Mak (Canada) Wong Yan Kit | (Brazil) Tamires Santos (Brazil) Ana Júlia Ywata | (Peru) Sharum Durand (Peru) Rafaela Munar |
| (Slovakia) KAWASAKI Slovak Open 2026 | (Sweden) Muh Azahbru Kasra | (Malaysia) Carine Tee | (Malaysia) Damien Ling (Malaysia) Irfan Shazmir | (Chinese Taipei) Chen Hsin-tung (Chinese Taipei) Chen Yu-hsi | (Chinese Taipei) Huang Tzu-yuan (Chinese Taipei) Kung Chia-yi |
| (Germany) YONEX Bonn International 2026 | (Hong Kong) Lam Ka To | (Chinese Taipei) Liao Jui-chi | (Germany) Danial Marzuan (Germany) Aaron Sonnenschein | (Chinese Taipei) Chen Hsin-tung (Chinese Taipei) Chen Yu-hsi | (Switzerland) Nicolas Franconville (Switzerland) Julie Franconville |
| RSL Latvia International 2026 | (Chinese Taipei) Chen Yu-cheng | (Hong Kong) Ip Sum Yau | (Italy) Matteo Massetti (Italy) David Salutt | (Ukraine) Maria Koriagina (Ukraine) Yaroslava Vantsarovska | (Denmark) Alexander Pedersen (Austria) Serena Au Yeong |
| Paraguay Open 2026 | (Brazil) Donnians Oliveira | (Switzerland) Jenjira Stadelmann | (Brazil) Renan Melo (Brazil) Donnians Oliveira | (Peru) Naomi Junco (Peru) Namie Miyahira | (Brazil) Marcos Ryan Sousa (Brazil) Ana Júlia Ywata |
| III Venezuela Future Series 2026 | Cancelled | | | | |
| (Czech Republic) Czech International Future Series 2026 | (Germany) Luis Pongratz | (Vietnam) Vũ Thị Trang | (United Arab Emirates) Dev Ayyappan (United Arab Emirates) Dhiren Ayyappan | (Germany) Stine Küspert (Germany) Isabel Lohau | (United Arab Emirates) Dhiren Ayyappan (United Arab Emirates) Taabia Khan |
| (France) FZ FORZA Future Series Nouvelle-Aquitaine 2026 | (Denmark) Victor Ørding Kauffmann | (Vietnam) Vũ Thị Trang | (France) Rayan Benaissa (France) Mady Sow | (Netherlands) Kirsten de Wit (Netherlands) Meerte Loos | (Netherlands) Joep Strooper (Netherlands) Sterre Bang |
| FELET Mauritius International 2026 | Cancelled | | | | |
| II Internacional Badminton Sucre Capital de Bolivia 2026 | (Malta) Matthew Abela | (Colombia) Juliana Giraldo | (Bolivia) Jorge Alejandro Paniagua Palma (Bolivia) Gabriel Danilo Rosales Medina | (Bolivia) Camila Lucero Mullisaca Quispe (Bolivia) Juanita Siviora | (Malta) Matthew Abela (Poland) Gabriela Skorkowska |
| (Dominican Republic) Dominican International 2026 | (United States) Jay Chun | (Switzerland) Jenjira Stadelmann | (Argentina) Nicolas Oliva (Argentina) Santiago Otero | (Dominican Republic) Alissa Acosta (Dominican Republic) Daniela Acosta | (Dominican Republic) Yonatan Linarez (Dominican Republic) Nairoby Abigail Jiménez |
| VI Mexico Future Series 2026 | (Japan) Shunki Hagiwara | (Japan) Saki Matsumoto | (Japan) Mahiro Oku (Japan) Masato Yamashiro | (Japan) Meisa Anami (Japan) Ria Haga | (Japan) Mahiro Oku (Japan) Ria Haga |
| Vlll Guatemala Future Series 2026 | (Japan) Shunki Hagiwara | (Japan) Meisa Anami | (Japan) Mahiro Oku (Japan) Masato Yamashiro | (Japan) Aoi Banno (Japan) Yuzu Ueno | (Japan) Mahiro Oku (Japan) Ria Haga |
| III Costa Rica Future Series 2026 | (United States) Jay Chun | (Colombia) Juliana Giraldo | (Chinese Taipei) Chen Hui-heng (Chinese Taipei) Tseng Sheng-an | (Peru) Ariana Munar (Peru) Fernanda Munar | (Colombia) Jeronimo Giraldo (Colombia) Juliana Giraldo |
| (Lithuania) RSL Lithuanian International 2026 | (South Korea) Choi Pyeong-gang | (France) Léonice Huet | (Finland) Ananda Galvani Daniswara (Indonesia) Alan Muhammad Afwanil Hakim | (Ukraine) Maria Koriagina (Ukraine) Yaroslava Vantsarovska | (Austria) Ilija Nicolussi (Austria) Lena Rumpold |
| (Colombia) II La Perla del Otún Future Series 2026 | Cancelled | | | | |
| (Croatia) VICTOR Croatian International 2026 | (France) Mady Sow | (India) Anwesha Gowda | (Norway) Torjus Flaaten (Norway) Jonas Østhassel | (France) Lily Gautier (France) Manon Heitzmann | (Denmark) Alexander Pedersen (Austria) Serena Au Yeong |
| (Uganda) Kampala International 2026 | (India) Abhishek Kanapala | (India) Ishita Negi | (India) Abhyuday Choudhary (India) Ayush Makhija | (India) Sonali Singh (India) Ritika Thaker | (Malaysia) Hafiz Hakimi Hashim (Malaysia) Lim Xuan |
| (Bulgaria) YONEX Bulgarian International Championship 2026 | (Denmark) Christopher Vittoriani | (Ukraine) Maria Koriagina | (Serbia) Andrija Doder (Serbia) Sergej Lukic | (Ukraine) Maria Koriagina (Ukraine) Yaroslava Vantsarovska | (Lithuania) Rokas Lesinskas (Ukraine) Yaroslava Vantsarovska |
| 3rd Iran International Future Series Khazar (Caspian) Cup 2026 | Cancelled | | | | |
| (Greece) Hellas International 2026 | (England) Ethan Rose | (India) Durga Esha Kandrapu | (Lithuania) Danielius Beržanskis (Lithuania) Domas Paksys | (Denmark) Emma Jonassen (Denmark) Marie Viscovich | (Republic of Ireland) Scott Guildea (Republic of Ireland) Rachael Darragh |
| 1st Qatar Future Series 2026 | Cancelled | | | | |
| Guyana GNR International 2026 | Cancelled | | | | |
| (Norway) FZ FORZA Norwegian International 2026 | (Denmark) Mathias Solgaard | (Denmark) Laura Fløj Thomsen | (Denmark) Mikkel Eilersen Bouet (Denmark) Oliver Geisler | (Denmark) Maria Søgård Andersen (Denmark) Rebecca Thorup | (Finland) Ananda Galvani Daniswara (Estonia) Elisaveta Berik |
| (Turkey) NAVEK Türkiye International Future Series 2026 | (Turkey) Mehmet Can Töremiş | (Switzerland) Azkya Aliefa Ruhanda | (Germany) Simon Schenk (Germany) Ole Schroth | (Individual Neutral Athletes) Maryna Yanbayeva (Individual Neutral Athletes) Sofiya Yanouskaya | (Turkey) Buğra Aktaş (Turkey) Sinem Yıldız |
| (Australia) YONEX Melbourne International 2026 | (South Korea) Kim Dong-hun | (South Korea) Boo Seo-yeon | (South Korea) Cheon Ji-min (South Korea) Park Seung-min | (South Korea) Kim So-hee (South Korea) Yeon Seo-yeon | (South Korea) Park Seung-min (South Korea) Yeon Seo-yeon |
| Botswana International 2026 | Cancelled | | | | |
| VIII El Salvador International 2026 | | | | | |
| South Africa International 2026 | | | | | |
| (Slovenia) I FEEL SLOVENIA LI-NING Future Series 2026 | | | | | |

== Statistics ==
=== Performance by countries ===
Below are the 2026 BWF Continental Circuit performances by country. Only countries that have won a title are listed:

==== International Challenge ====
| Rank | Team | AZE (Azerbaijan) | UGA (Uganda) | SGP1 (Singapore) | POL (Poland) | VIE (Vietnam) | BRA (Brazil) | MEX (Mexico) | REU (Réunion) | DEN (Denmark) | THA1 (Thailand) | FRA (France) | NMI (Northern Mariana Islands) | SAI (Northern Mariana Islands) | PHI (Philippines) | MAS (Malaysia) | SGP2 (Singapore) | INA1 (Indonesia) | NGR (Nigeria) | CMR (Cameroon) | BEL (Belgium) | INA2 (Indonesia) | GUA (Guatemala) | NZL (New Zealand) | NED (Netherlands) | TUR (Turkey) | BND (Australia) | USA (United States) | SYD (Australia) | CZE (Czech Republic) | PER (Peru) | IND1 (India) | IND2 (India) | CHN (China) | IRL (Republic of Ireland) | INA3 (Indonesia) | SCO (Scotland) | THA2 (Thailand) | CAN (Canada) | BAN (Bangladesh) | Total |
|---|---|---|---|---|---|---|---|---|---|---|---|---|---|---|---|---|---|---|---|---|---|---|---|---|---|---|---|---|---|---|---|---|---|---|---|---|---|---|---|---|---|
| 1 | India | 2 | 3 | | 1 | 1 | | 2 | 4 | | | 1 | | | 2 | | | 1 | 3 | 3 | | | | | | 1 | | | | | | 2 | 3 | | | | | | | | 29 |
| 2 | Japan | 1 | | 1 | 1 | | 1 | 1 | | 1 | 1 | | 2 | 3 | | 4 | 5 | | | | | 2 | | 1 | | 1 | | | 1 | | | 1 | 1 | | | | | | | | 28 |
| 3 | Chinese Taipei | | | 1 | | 1 | | | | | | | | 1 | | | | | | | | | | 3 | 1 | | 4 | 1 | 2 | 1 | | | | | | 1 | 1 | | | | 17 |
| 4 | Indonesia | | | 1 | | 1 | | | | | 1 | | | | | | | 3 | | | | 3 | | | | | | 1 | | | | | | | | 3 | | | | | 13 |
| 5 | South Korea | | | 1 | | | | | | | | | 3 | 1 | | | | 1 | | | | | | | | | | | | | | | | | 3 | | 3 | | | | 12 |
| 6 | Brazil | | | | | | 4 | 2 | | | | | | | | | | | | | | | 3 | | | | | 1 | | | 1 | | | | | | | | | | 11 |
| 6 | Denmark | | | | | | | | | 1 | | | | | | | | | | | 3 | | | | 1 | 2 | | | | 1 | | | | | 2 | | 1 | | | | 11 |
| 8 | Thailand | | | | | | | | | | 3 | | | | 1 | 1 | | | 1 | 1 | | | | | | | | | | | | 1 | | | | | | | | | 8 |
| 9 | Canada | | | | | 0.5 | | | 1 | | | | | | | | | | | | | | 2 | | | | | 2 | | | 1 | | | | | | | | | | 6.5 |
| 10 | China | | | | | | | | | | | | | | | | | | | | | | | | | | | | | | | | | 5 | | | | | | | 5 |
| 10 | England | 1 | | | 1 | | | | | 1 | | 1 | | | | | | | | | | | | | | | | | | 1 | | | | | | | | | | | 5 |
| 10 | Germany | | | | 1 | | | | | 1 | | | | | | | | | | | | | | | 2 | | | | | 1 | | | | | | | | | | | 5 |
| 13 | Australia | | 1 | | | 0.5 | | | | | | | | | | | | | | | | | | 1 | | | 1 | | 1 | | | | | | | | | | | | 4.5 |
| 14 | France | | | | | | | | | | | 3 | | | | | | | | | | | | | | 1 | | | | | | | | | | | | | | | 4 |
| 14 | Malaysia | | | 1 | | | | | | | | | | | 2 | | | | | | | | | | | | | | | | | | | | | 1 | | | | | 4 |
| 16 | Scotland | | | | | | | | | | | | | | | | | | | | 2 | | | | 1 | | | | | | | | | | | | | | | | 3 |
| 17 | (Individual Neutral Athletes) Authorised Neutral Athlete | | | | | | | | | | | | | | | | | | | | | | | | | | | | | | | 1 | 1 | | | | | | | | 2 |
| 17 | United States | | 1 | | | | | | | | | | | | | | | | | | | | | | | | | | | | 1 | | | | | | | | | | 2 |
| 19 | Algeria | | | | | | | | | | | | | | | | | | | | | | | | | | | | | | 1 | | | | | | | | | | 1 |
| 19 | Azerbaijan | | | | | | | | | | | | | | | | | | | 1 | | | | | | | | | | | | | | | | | | | | | 1 |
| 19 | Croatia | | | | | | | | | | | | | | | | | | | | | | | | | | | | | | 1 | | | | | | | | | | 1 |
| 19 | Finland | | | | | | | | | | | | | | | | | | | | | | | | | | | | | 1 | | | | | | | | | | | 1 |
| 19 | Hong Kong | | | | | 1 | | | | | | | | | | | | | | | | | | | | | | | | | | | | | | | | | | | 1 |
| 19 | Israel | | | | | | | | | 1 | | | | | | | | | | | | | | | | | | | | | | | | | | | | | | | 1 |
| 19 | Philippines | | | | | | | | | | | | | | | | | | | | | | | | | | | | 1 | | | | | | | | | | | | 1 |
| 19 | Poland | 1 | | | | | | | | | | | | | | | | | | | | | | | | | | | | | | | | | | | | | | | 1 |
| 19 | Singapore | | | | 1 | | | | | | | | | | | | | | | | | | | | | | | | | | | | | | | | | | | | 1 |
| 19 | United Arab Emirates | | | | | | | | | | | | | | | | | | 1 | | | | | | | | | | | | | | | | | | | | | | 1 |

==== International Series ====
| Rank | Team | EST (Estonia) | SWE (Sweden) | SGP (Singapore) | POR (Portugal) | CUB (Cuba) | LUX (Luxembourg) | SLO (Slovenia) | AUT (Austria) | ITA (Italy) | PER (Peru) | JAM (Jamaica) | GHA (Ghana) | VIE1 (Vietnam) | MAS (Malaysia) | THA (Thailand) | POL (Poland) | SEN (Senegal) | UGA (Uganda) | DOM (Dominican Republic) | MEX (Mexico) | HUN (Hungary) | SUR (Suriname) | AUS (Australia) | ZAM (Zambia) | GUA (Guatemala) | WAL (Wales) | VIE2 (Vietnam) | ALG (Algeria) | EGY (Egypt) | USA (United States) | BAN (Bangladesh) | Total |
|---|---|---|---|---|---|---|---|---|---|---|---|---|---|---|---|---|---|---|---|---|---|---|---|---|---|---|---|---|---|---|---|---|---|
| 1 | India | 1 | 1 | | | 1 | | 3 | | | | 1 | 1 | 1 | | | | | 2 | | | | | | 1 | | | | | | | | 12 |
| 2 | Chinese Taipei | | | 1 | 2 | | | | 2 | | | | | | 1 | 1 | 1 | | | 1 | 2 | | | | | | | | | | | | 11 |
| 3 | Denmark | 1 | 1 | | 2 | | 1 | 1 | | 1 | | | | | | | | | | | | 1.5 | | | | | | | | | | | 8.5 |
| 4 | South Korea | | | | | | | | | | | | | 2 | | 1 | 1 | | | | | | | 4 | | | | | | | | | 8 |
| 5 | Germany | 1 | | | | | | | 2 | 2 | | | | | | | | | | 2 | | 0.5 | | | | | | | | | | | 7.5 |
| 6 | Malaysia | 1 | 1 | | | | | | | | | | | | 3 | | | | 2 | | | | | | | | | | | | | | 7 |
| 6 | Thailand | | | 2 | | | | | | | | | | 2 | 1 | 2 | | | | | | | | | | | | | | | | | 7 |
| 8 | Japan | 1 | 1 | | | | 2 | | | | | | | | | 1 | | | | 1 | | | | | | | | | | | | | 6 |
| 9 | Guatemala | | | | | | | | | | 2 | | | | | | | | | | | | | | | 3 | | | | | | | 5 |
| 9 | United States | | | | | 1 | | | | | 1 | 1 | | | | | | | | | 1 | | | | | 1 | | | | | | | 5 |
| 11 | United Arab Emirates | | | | | | | | | 1 | | | 2.5 | | | | | | | | | | | | 1 | | | | | | | | 4.5 |
| 12 | Azerbaijan | | | | | | | | | | | | | | | | | | | | | | 4 | | | | | | | | | | 4 |
| 13 | Mexico | | | | | 1 | | | | | | | | | | | | | | | 2 | | | | | | | | | | | | 3 |
| 13 | Switzerland | | | | | | | | | | 1 | 1 | | | | | | | | | | 1 | | | | | | | | | | | 3 |
| 15 | Brazil | | | | 1 | | | | | | | | | | | | | | | 1 | | | | | | | | | | | | | 2 |
| 15 | Cuba | | | | | 2 | | | | | | | | | | | | | | | | | | | | | | | | | | | 2 |
| 15 | Czech Republic | | | | | | 1 | | | | | | | | | | | 1 | | | | | | | | | | | | | | | 2 |
| 15 | England | | 1 | | | | | | | 1 | | | | | | | | | | | | | | | | | | | | | | | 2 |
| 15 | Indonesia | | | 2 | | | | | | | | | | | | | | | | | | | | | | | | | | | | | 2 |
| 15 | Myanmar | | | | | | | | | | | | | | | | | | 1 | | | | | | 1 | | | | | | | | 2 |
| 15 | Netherlands | | | | | | | 1 | | | | | | | | | 1 | | | | | | | | | | | | | | | | 2 |
| 15 | Peru | | | | | | | | | | | 1 | | | | | | | | | | | 1 | | | | | | | | | | 2 |
| 15 | Serbia | | | | | | | | | | | | | | | | | | | | | 2 | | | | | | | | | | | 2 |
| 24 | Australia | | | | | | | | | | | | 0.5 | | | | | | | | | | | 1 | | | | | | | | | 1.5 |
| 24 | Ukraine | | | | | | | | | | | | | | | | | 1.5 | | | | | | | | | | | | | | | 1.5 |
| 26 | (Individual Neutral Athletes) Authorised Neutral Athlete | | | | | | 1 | | | | | | | | | | | | | | | | | | | | | | | | | | 1 |
| 26 | Canada | | | | | | | | 1 | | | | | | | | | | | | | | | | | | | | | | | | 1 |
| 26 | Ghana | | | | | | | | | | | | 1 | | | | | | | | | | | | | | | | | | | | 1 |
| 26 | Greece | | | | | | | | | | | | | | | | | | | | | | | | | 1 | | | | | | | 1 |
| 26 | Iran | | | | | | | | | | | | | | | | | 1 | | | | | | | | | | | | | | | 1 |
| 26 | Ireland | | | | | | | | | | | | | | | | 1 | | | | | | | | | | | | | | | | 1 |
| 26 | Italy | | | | | | | | | | 1 | | | | | | | | | | | | | | | | | | | | | | 1 |
| 26 | Jamaica | | | | | | | | | | | 1 | | | | | | | | | | | | | | | | | | | | | 1 |
| 26 | Senegal | | | | | | | | | | | | | | | | | 1 | | | | | | | | | | | | | | | 1 |
| 26 | Slovenia | | | | | | | | | | | | | | | | | | | | | | | | 1 | | | | | | | | 1 |
| 26 | South Africa | | | | | | | | | | | | | | | | | | | | | | | | 1 | | | | | | | | 1 |
| 26 | Spain | | | | | | | | | | | | | | | | 1 | | | | | | | | | | | | | | | | 1 |
| 38 | Poland | | | | | | | | | | | | | | | | | 0.5 | | | | | | | | | | | | | | | 0.5 |

==== Future Series ====
| Rank | Team | ISL (Iceland) | CUB (Cuba) | HUN (Hungary) | MLT (Malta) | FIN (Finland) | PER (Peru) | SVK (Slovakia) | GER (Germany) | LAT (Latvia) | PAR (Paraguay) | CZE (Czech Republic) | FRA (France) | BOL (Bolivia) | DOM (Dominican Republic) | MEX (Mexico) | GUA (Guatemala) | CRC (Costa Rica) | LTU (Lithuania) | CRO (Croatia) | UGA (Uganda) | BUL (Bulgaria) | GRE (Greece) | NOR (Norway) | TUR (Turkey) | AUS (Australia) | ESA (El Salvador) | RSA (South Africa) | SLO (Slovenia) | Total |
|---|---|---|---|---|---|---|---|---|---|---|---|---|---|---|---|---|---|---|---|---|---|---|---|---|---|---|---|---|---|---|
| 1 | Denmark | 1 | | 3 | | | | | | 0.5 | | | 1 | | | | | | | 0.5 | | 1 | 1 | 4 | | | | | | 12 |
| 1 | Japan | | | | | 2 | | | | | | | | | | 5 | 5 | | | | | | | | | | | | | 12 |
| 3 | Chinese Taipei | 1 | | | | | | 2 | 2 | 1 | | | | | | | | 1 | | | | | | | | | | | | 7 |
| 4 | India | | | | | | | | | | | | | | | | | | | 1 | 4 | | 1 | | | | | | | 6 |
| 4 | South Korea | | | | | | | | | | | | | | | | | | 1 | | | | | | | 5 | | | | 6 |
| 6 | France | 1 | | | | | | | | | | | 1 | | | | | | 1 | 2 | | | | | | | | | | 5 |
| 6 | Germany | | | 1 | | | | | 1 | | | 2 | | | | | | | | | | | | | 1 | | | | | 5 |
| 6 | Switzerland | 1 | | | | | | | 1 | | 1 | | | | 1 | | | | | | | | | | 1 | | | | | 5 |
| 9 | Ukraine | | | | | | | | | 1 | | | | | | | | | 1 | | | 2.5 | | | | | | | | 4.5 |
| 10 | Brazil | | | | | | 1 | | | | 3 | | | | | | | | | | | | | | | | | | | 4 |
| 10 | Peru | | | | | | 2 | | | | 1 | | | | | | | 1 | | | | | | | | | | | | 4 |
| 10 | United Arab Emirates | | | | 2 | | | | | | | 2 | | | | | | | | | | | | | | | | | | 4 |
| 13 | Colombia | | | | | | | | | | | | | 1 | | | | 2 | | | | | | | | | | | | 3 |
| 13 | Dominican Republic | | 1 | | | | | | | | | | | | 2 | | | | | | | | | | | | | | | 3 |
| 13 | Malaysia | | | | | | | 2 | | | | | | | | | | | | | 1 | | | | | | | | | 3 |
| 13 | United States | | 1 | | | | | | | | | | | | 1 | | | 1 | | | | | | | | | | | | 3 |
| 17 | Austria | | | | | | | | | 0.5 | | | | | | | | | 1 | 0.5 | | | | | | | | | | 2 |
| 17 | (Individual Neutral Athletes) Authorised Neutral Athlete | 1 | | | | | | | | | | | | | | | | | | | | | | | 1 | | | | | 2 |
| 17 | Bolivia | | | | | | | | | | | | | 2 | | | | | | | | | | | | | | | | 2 |
| 17 | Canada | | | | | | 2 | | | | | | | | | | | | | | | | | | | | | | | 2 |
| 17 | Cuba | | 2 | | | | | | | | | | | | | | | | | | | | | | | | | | | 2 |
| 17 | England | | | | 1 | | | | | | | | | | | | | | | | | | 1 | | | | | | | 2 |
| 17 | Finland | | | | | 1 | | | | | | | | | | | | | 0.5 | | | | | 0.5 | | | | | | 2 |
| 17 | Hong Kong | | | | | | | | 1 | 1 | | | | | | | | | | | | | | | | | | | | 2 |
| 17 | Ireland | | | | 1 | | | | | | | | | | | | | | | | | | 1 | | | | | | | 2 |
| 17 | Netherlands | | | | | | | | | | | | 2 | | | | | | | | | | | | | | | | | 2 |
| 17 | Sweden | | | | | 1 | | 1 | | | | | | | | | | | | | | | | | | | | | | 2 |
| 17 | Turkey | | | | | | | | | | | | | | | | | | | | | | | | 2 | | | | | 2 |
| 17 | Vietnam | | | | | | | | | | | 1 | 1 | | | | | | | | | | | | | | | | | 2 |
| 30 | Estonia | | | | | 1 | | | | | | | | | | | | | | | | | | 0.5 | | | | | | 1.5 |
| 30 | Lithuania | | | | | | | | | | | | | | | | | | | | | 0.5 | 1 | | | | | | | 1.5 |
| 30 | Malta | | | | | | | | | | | | | 1.5 | | | | | | | | | | | | | | | | 1.5 |
| 30 | Poland | | | | 1 | | | | | | | | | 0.5 | | | | | | | | | | | | | | | | 1.5 |
| 34 | Argentina | | | | | | | | | | | | | | 1 | | | | | | | | | | | | | | | 1 |
| 34 | Bulgaria | | | 1 | | | | | | | | | | | | | | | | | | | | | | | | | | 1 |
| 34 | El Salvador | | 1 | | | | | | | | | | | | | | | | | | | | | | | | | | | 1 |
| 34 | Italy | | | | | | | | | 1 | | | | | | | | | | | | | | | | | | | | 1 |
| 34 | Norway | | | | | | | | | | | | | | | | | | | 1 | | | | | | | | | | 1 |
| 34 | Serbia | | | | | | | | | | | | | | | | | | | | | 1 | | | | | | | | 1 |
| 40 | Indonesia | | | | | | | | | | | | | | | | | | 0.5 | | | | | | | | | | | 0.5 |

=== Performance by categories ===
These tables were calculated after the finals of the Guatemala International Series.

==== Men's singles ====
| Rank | Player | IC | IS | FS | Total |
|---|---|---|---|---|---|
| 1 | (Brazil) Jonathan Matias | 3 | | | 3 |
| 2 | (Denmark) Victor Ørding Kauffmann | 2 | | 1 | 3 |
| 3 | (United States) Jay Chun | | 1 | 2 | 3 |
| 4 | (Indonesia) Richie Duta Richardo | 2 | | | 2 |
| 4 | (Japan) Rei Miyashita | 2 | | | 2 |
| 4 | (Japan) Shogo Ogawa | 2 | | | 2 |
| 7 | (Australia) Karono | 1 | 1 | | 2 |
| 7 | (Denmark) Karan Rajan | 1 | 1 | | 2 |
| 7 | (India) Sathish Karunakaran | 1 | 1 | | 2 |
| 10 | (Poland) Dominik Kwinta | 1 | | 1 | 2 |
| 11 | (Japan) Minoru Koga | | 2 | | 2 |
| 12 | (Denmark) Mathias Solgaard | | 1 | 1 | 2 |
| 12 | (South Korea) Choi Pyeong-gang | | 1 | 1 | 2 |
| 14 | (Denmark) Christopher Vittoriani | | | 2 | 2 |
| 14 | (Japan) Shunki Hagiwara | | | 2 | 2 |
| 16 | (Australia) Muhammad Rafi Zafran Ferary | 1 | | | 1 |
| 16 | (China) Sun Chao | 1 | | | 1 |
| 16 | (Chinese Taipei) Liao Jhuo-fu | 1 | | | 1 |
| 16 | (Chinese Taipei) Su Li-yang | 1 | | | 1 |
| 16 | (Chinese Taipei) Ting Yen-chen | 1 | | | 1 |
| 16 | (Chinese Taipei) Wu Zhe-ying | 1 | | | 1 |
| 16 | (Croatia) Aria Dinata | 1 | | | 1 |
| 16 | (Finland) Joakim Oldorff | 1 | | | 1 |
| 16 | (India) Rounak Chouhan | 1 | | | 1 |
| 16 | (India) Hmar Lalthazuala | 1 | | | 1 |
| 16 | (India) Rithvik Sanjeevi | 1 | | | 1 |
| 16 | (India) Ginpaul Sonna | 1 | | | 1 |
| 16 | (India) Tushar Suveer | 1 | | | 1 |
| 16 | (India) Tankara Gnana Dattu Talasila | 1 | | | 1 |
| 16 | (Indonesia) Muhammad Rizky Akbar | 1 | | | 1 |
| 16 | (Indonesia) Muhammad Reza Al Fajri | 1 | | | 1 |
| 16 | (Indonesia) Bismo Raya Oktora | 1 | | | 1 |
| 16 | (Israel) Daniil Dubovenko | 1 | | | 1 |
| 16 | (Japan) Riku Hatano | 1 | | | 1 |
| 16 | (Singapore) Jason Teh | 1 | | | 1 |
| 16 | (South Korea) Park Sang-yong | 1 | | | 1 |
| 37 | (Azerbaijan) Ade Resky Dwicahyo | | 1 | | 1 |
| 37 | (Chinese Taipei) Yang Chieh-dan | | 1 | | 1 |
| 37 | (Denmark) Jeppe Bruun | | 1 | | 1 |
| 37 | (Germany) Matthias Kicklitz | | 1 | | 1 |
| 37 | (Guatemala) Kevin Cordón | | 1 | | 1 |
| 37 | (India) Manav Choudhary | | 1 | | 1 |
| 37 | (India) Dhruv Negi | | 1 | | 1 |
| 37 | (India) Nithin Raghavendar | | 1 | | 1 |
| 37 | (Iran) Ali Hayati | | 1 | | 1 |
| 37 | (Italy) Giovanni Toti | | 1 | | 1 |
| 37 | (Japan) Akira Hanada | | 1 | | 1 |
| 37 | (Japan) Koya Iwano | | 1 | | 1 |
| 37 | (Malaysia) Danial Razeeq | | 1 | | 1 |
| 37 | (Myanmar) Hein Htut | | 1 | | 1 |
| 37 | (Switzerland) Julien Scheiwiller | | 1 | | 1 |
| 37 | (Thailand) Wongsup Wongsup-in | | 1 | | 1 |
| 37 | (United Arab Emirates) Riyan Malhan | | 1 | | 1 |
| 54 | (Brazil) Donnians Oliveira | | | 1 | 1 |
| 54 | (Canada) Xiaodong Sheng | | | 1 | 1 |
| 54 | (Chinese Taipei) Chen Yu-cheng | | | 1 | 1 |
| 54 | (Denmark) Mikkel Langemark | | | 1 | 1 |
| 54 | (El Salvador) Uriel Canjura | | | 1 | 1 |
| 54 | (England) Ethan Rose | | | 1 | 1 |
| 54 | (France) Mady Sow | | | 1 | 1 |
| 54 | (Germany) Luis Pongratz | | | 1 | 1 |
| 54 | (Hong Kong) Lam Ka To | | | 1 | 1 |
| 54 | (India) Abhishek Kanapala | | | 1 | 1 |
| 54 | (Japan) Hyuga Takano | | | 1 | 1 |
| 54 | (Malta) Matthew Abela | | | 1 | 1 |
| 54 | (South Korea) Kim Dong-hun | | | 1 | 1 |
| 54 | (Sweden) Muh Azahbru Kasra | | | 1 | 1 |
| 54 | (Turkey) Mehmet Can Töremiş | | | 1 | 1 |

==== Women's singles ====
| Rank | Player | IC | IS | FS | Total |
|---|---|---|---|---|---|
| 1 | (Japan) Sakura Masuki | 3 | | | 3 |
| 2 | (Brazil) Juliana Viana Vieira | 2 | 1 | | 3 |
| 3 | (United Arab Emirates) Prakriti Bharath | 1 | 1 | 1 | 3 |
| 4 | (Switzerland) Jenjira Stadelmann | | 1 | 2 | 3 |
| 5 | (Germany) Yvonne Li | 2 | | | 2 |
| 5 | (India) Rakshitha Ramraj | 2 | | | 2 |
| 5 | (South Korea) Kim Min-ji | 2 | | | 2 |
| 5 | (Thailand) Sarunrak Vitidsarn | 2 | | | 2 |
| 9 | (Azerbaijan) Keisha Fatimah Azzahra | 1 | 1 | | 2 |
| 9 | (Thailand) Yataweemin Ketklieng | 1 | 1 | | 2 |
| 11 | (Chinese Taipei) Liao Jui-chi | 1 | | 1 | 2 |
| 12 | (India) Rujula Ramu | | 2 | | 2 |
| 13 | (Peru) Inés Castillo | | 1 | 1 | 2 |
| 14 | (Colombia) Juliana Giraldo | | | 2 | 2 |
| 14 | (Vietnam) Vũ Thị Trang | | | 2 | 2 |
| 16 | (China) Chen Xintong | 1 | | | 1 |
| 16 | (Chinese Taipei) Chen Su-yu | 1 | | | 1 |
| 16 | (Chinese Taipei) Huang Ching-ping | 1 | | | 1 |
| 16 | (Chinese Taipei) Sung Shuo-yun | 1 | | | 1 |
| 16 | (Chinese Taipei) Tung Ciou-tong | 1 | | | 1 |
| 16 | (France) Anna Tatranova | 1 | | | 1 |
| 16 | (India) Unnati Hooda | 1 | | | 1 |
| 16 | (India) Anmol Kharb | 1 | | | 1 |
| 16 | (India) Tasnim Mir | 1 | | | 1 |
| 16 | (India) Tanvi Patri | 1 | | | 1 |
| 16 | (India) Devika Sihag | 1 | | | 1 |
| 16 | (India) Anupama Upadhyaya | 1 | | | 1 |
| 16 | (India) Shriyanshi Valishetty | 1 | | | 1 |
| 16 | (Japan) Manami Suizu | 1 | | | 1 |
| 16 | (Malaysia) Goh Jin Wei | 1 | | | 1 |
| 16 | (Malaysia) Oo Shan Zi | 1 | | | 1 |
| 16 | (Scotland) Kirsty Gilmour | 1 | | | 1 |
| 16 | (Thailand) Thamonwan Nithiittikrai | 1 | | | 1 |
| 16 | (United States) Ella Lin | 1 | | | 1 |
| 35 | (Canada) Rachel Chan | | 1 | | 1 |
| 35 | (Chinese Taipei) Lee Yu-hsuan | | 1 | | 1 |
| 35 | (Chinese Taipei) Su Xiao-ting | | 1 | | 1 |
| 35 | (Czech Republic) Petra Maixnerová | | 1 | | 1 |
| 35 | (Czech Republic) Tereza Švábíková | | 1 | | 1 |
| 35 | (Greece) Grammatoula Sotiriou | | 1 | | 1 |
| 35 | (India) Aesha Gandhi | | 1 | | 1 |
| 35 | (India) Ilishaa Pal | | 1 | | 1 |
| 35 | (Republic of Ireland) Sophia Noble | | 1 | | 1 |
| 35 | (Japan) Nayu Shirakawa | | 1 | | 1 |
| 35 | (Myanmar) Thet Htar Thuzar | | 1 | | 1 |
| 35 | (South Korea) Kim Do-yeon | | 1 | | 1 |
| 35 | (Switzerland) Milena Schnider | | 1 | | 1 |
| 35 | (Thailand) Tidapron Kleebyeesun | | 1 | | 1 |
| 35 | (Thailand) Anyapat Phichitpreechasak | | 1 | | 1 |
| 35 | (United Arab Emirates) Nurani Ratu Azzahra | | 1 | | 1 |
| 35 | (United States) Ishika Jaiswal | | 1 | | 1 |
| 52 | (Bulgaria) Hristomira Popovska | | | 1 | 1 |
| 52 | (Chinese Taipei) Huang Sheng-chun | | | 1 | 1 |
| 52 | (Cuba) Taymara Oropesa | | | 1 | 1 |
| 52 | (Denmark) Laura Fløj Thomsen | | | 1 | 1 |
| 52 | (France) Léonice Huet | | | 1 | 1 |
| 52 | (Hong Kong) Ip Sum Yau | | | 1 | 1 |
| 52 | (India) Anwesha Gowda | | | 1 | 1 |
| 52 | (India) Durga Esha Kandrapu | | | 1 | 1 |
| 52 | (India) Ishita Negi | | | 1 | 1 |
| 52 | (Japan) Meisa Anami | | | 1 | 1 |
| 52 | (Japan) Saki Matsumoto | | | 1 | 1 |
| 52 | (Japan) Yuzuno Watanabe | | | 1 | 1 |
| 52 | (Malaysia) Carine Tee | | | 1 | 1 |
| 52 | (South Korea) Boo Seo-yeon | | | 1 | 1 |
| 52 | (Switzerland) Azkya Aliefa Ruhanda | | | 1 | 1 |
| 52 | (Ukraine) Maria Koriagina | | | 1 | 1 |

==== Men's doubles ====
| Rank | Players | IC | IS | FS | Total |
|---|---|---|---|---|---|
| 1 | (Chinese Taipei) Chiu Shao-hua | 3 | | | 3 |
| 1 | (Chinese Taipei) Lin Bing-wei | 3 | | | 3 |
| 1 | (India) Krishna Prasad Garaga | 3 | | | 3 |
| 1 | (India) Pruthvi Roy | 3 | | | 3 |
| 5 | (Thailand) Thanawin Madee | 2 | 1 | | 3 |
| 5 | (Thailand) Pongsakorn Thongkham | 2 | 1 | | 3 |
| 7 | (Canada) Kevin Lee | 2 | | | 2 |
| 7 | (Canada) Ty Alexander Lindeman | 2 | | | 2 |
| 7 | (England) Alex Green | 2 | | | 2 |
| 7 | (England) Zach Russ | 2 | | | 2 |
| 7 | (Indonesia) Taufik Aderya | 2 | | | 2 |
| 7 | (Japan) Takuto Goto | 2 | | | 2 |
| 7 | (Scotland) Christopher Grimley | 2 | | | 2 |
| 7 | (Scotland) Matthew Grimley | 2 | | | 2 |
| 7 | (South Korea) Jin Sung-ik | 2 | | | 2 |
| 7 | (South Korea) Lee Hyeong-woo | 2 | | | 2 |
| 17 | (Denmark) Christian Faust Kjær | 1 | 1 | | 2 |
| 17 | (Denmark) Rasmus Kjær | 1 | 1 | | 2 |
| 17 | (Germany) Malik Bourakkadi | 1 | 1 | | 2 |
| 17 | (Germany) Kenneth Neumann | 1 | 1 | | 2 |
| 17 | (India) Ruban Kumar | 1 | 1 | | 2 |
| 17 | (India) Sai Pratheek K. | 1 | 1 | | 2 |
| 17 | (Japan) Yuta Oku | 1 | 1 | | 2 |
| 24 | (Denmark) Robert Nebel | | 2 | | 2 |
| 24 | (Denmark) Jeppe Søby | | 2 | | 2 |
| 24 | (United States) Joshua Yang | | 2 | | 2 |
| 27 | (Germany) Danial Marzuan | | 1 | 1 | 2 |
| 27 | (Germany) Aaron Sonnenschein | | 1 | 1 | 2 |
| 27 | (India) Abhyuday Choudhary | | 1 | 1 | 2 |
| 27 | (India) Ayush Makhija | | 1 | 1 | 2 |
| 27 | (South Korea) Cheon Ji-min | | 1 | 1 | 2 |
| 27 | (South Korea) Park Seung-min | | 1 | 1 | 2 |
| 33 | (Japan) Mahiro Oku | | | 2 | 2 |
| 33 | (Japan) Masato Yamashiro | | | 2 | 2 |
| 35 | (Brazil) Fabrício Farias | 1 | | | 1 |
| 35 | (Brazil) Davi Silva | 1 | | | 1 |
| 35 | (China) Chen Junting | 1 | | | 1 |
| 35 | (China) Huang Di | 1 | | | 1 |
| 35 | (Chinese Taipei) Huang Tsung-i | 1 | | | 1 |
| 35 | (Chinese Taipei) Lin Ting-yu | 1 | | | 1 |
| 35 | (Chinese Taipei) Wei Chun-wei | 1 | | | 1 |
| 35 | (Chinese Taipei) Yang Po-chih | 1 | | | 1 |
| 35 | (Denmark) William Kryger Boe | 1 | | | 1 |
| 35 | (Denmark) Rasmus Espersen | 1 | | | 1 |
| 35 | (France) Maël Cattoen | 1 | | | 1 |
| 35 | (France) William Villeger | 1 | | | 1 |
| 35 | (India) Bhargav Arigela | 1 | | | 1 |
| 35 | (India) Vishwatej Gobburu | 1 | | | 1 |
| 35 | (Indonesia) M. Nawaf Khoiriyansyah | 1 | | | 1 |
| 35 | (Indonesia) Daniel Edgar Marvino | 1 | | | 1 |
| 35 | (Indonesia) Wahyu Agung Prasetyo | 1 | | | 1 |
| 35 | (Indonesia) Adrian Pratama | 1 | | | 1 |
| 35 | (Indonesia) Pulung Ramadhan | 1 | | | 1 |
| 35 | (Indonesia) Alexius Ongkytama Subagio | 1 | | | 1 |
| 35 | (Japan) Tori Aizawa | 1 | | | 1 |
| 35 | (Japan) Naoya Kawashima | 1 | | | 1 |
| 35 | (Japan) Kota Ogawa | 1 | | | 1 |
| 35 | (Japan) Daisuke Sano | 1 | | | 1 |
| 35 | (Japan) Tsubasa Yoshida | 1 | | | 1 |
| 35 | (Malaysia) Choong Hon Jian | 1 | | | 1 |
| 35 | (Malaysia) Wong Vin Sean | 1 | | | 1 |
| 35 | (Philippines) Solomon Padiz Jr. | 1 | | | 1 |
| 35 | (Philippines) Julius Villabrille | 1 | | | 1 |
| 64 | (Azerbaijan) Ade Resky Dwicahyo | | 1 | | 1 |
| 64 | (Azerbaijan) Dicky Dwi Pangestu | | 1 | | 1 |
| 64 | (Brazil) Izak Batalha | | 1 | | 1 |
| 64 | (Brazil) Matheus Voigt | | 1 | | 1 |
| 64 | (England) Oliver Butler | | 1 | | 1 |
| 64 | (England) Samuel Jones | | 1 | | 1 |
| 64 | (Indonesia) Erwin Rendana Purnomo | | 1 | | 1 |
| 64 | (Indonesia) Ade Yusuf Santoso | | 1 | | 1 |
| 64 | (Japan) Shuntaro Mezaki | | 1 | | 1 |
| 64 | (Malaysia) Hafiz Hakimi Hashim | | 1 | | 1 |
| 64 | (Malaysia) Lau Yi Sheng | | 1 | | 1 |
| 64 | (Malaysia) Lee Yi Bo | | 1 | | 1 |
| 64 | (Malaysia) Wong Meng Fong | | 1 | | 1 |
| 64 | (Mexico) Armando Gaitan | | 1 | | 1 |
| 64 | (Mexico) Nestor González | | 1 | | 1 |
| 64 | (Mexico) Juan Pablo Montoya | | 1 | | 1 |
| 64 | (Mexico) Juan Torres | | 1 | | 1 |
| 64 | (Serbia) Viktor Petrovic | | 1 | | 1 |
| 64 | (Serbia) Mihajlo Tomić | | 1 | | 1 |
| 64 | (South Korea) Choi Sol-gyu | | 1 | | 1 |
| 64 | (South Korea) Lim Su-min | | 1 | | 1 |
| 64 | (Spain) Jacobo Fernández | | 1 | | 1 |
| 64 | (Spain) Alberto Perals | | 1 | | 1 |
| 64 | (Ukraine) Vladyslav Kunin | | 1 | | 1 |
| 64 | (Ukraine) Yegor Romaniuk | | 1 | | 1 |
| 64 | (United Arab Emirates) Bharath Latheesh | | 1 | | 1 |
| 64 | (United Arab Emirates) Dev Vishnu | | 1 | | 1 |
| 64 | (United States) Ryan Nibu | | 1 | | 1 |
| 64 | (United States) Srinivas Subash | | 1 | | 1 |
| 93 | (Argentina) Nicolas Oliva | | | 1 | 1 |
| 93 | (Argentina) Santiago Otero | | | 1 | 1 |
| 93 | (Bolivia) Jorge Alejandro Paniagua Palma | | | 1 | 1 |
| 93 | (Bolivia) Gabriel Danilo Rosales Medina | | | 1 | 1 |
| 93 | (Brazil) Renan Melo | | | 1 | 1 |
| 93 | (Brazil) Donnians Oliveira | | | 1 | 1 |
| 93 | (Canada) Jason Mak | | | 1 | 1 |
| 93 | (Canada) Wong Yan Kit | | | 1 | 1 |
| 93 | (Chinese Taipei) Chen Hui-heng | | | 1 | 1 |
| 93 | (Chinese Taipei) Tseng Sheng-an | | | 1 | 1 |
| 93 | (Denmark) Sebastian Mønster Andersen | | | 1 | 1 |
| 93 | (Denmark) Mikkel Eilersen Bouet | | | 1 | 1 |
| 93 | (Denmark) Oliver Geisler | | | 1 | 1 |
| 93 | (Denmark) Birk Norman | | | 1 | 1 |
| 93 | (England) Robin Harper | | | 1 | 1 |
| 93 | (England) Harry Wakefield | | | 1 | 1 |
| 93 | (Finland) Ananda Galvani Daniswara | | | 1 | 1 |
| 93 | (France) Rayan Benaissa | | | 1 | 1 |
| 93 | (France) Baptiste Labarthe | | | 1 | 1 |
| 93 | (France) Quentin Ronget | | | 1 | 1 |
| 93 | (France) Mady Sow | | | 1 | 1 |
| 93 | (Germany) Simon Schenk | | | 1 | 1 |
| 93 | (Germany) Ole Schroth | | | 1 | 1 |
| 93 | (Indonesia) Alan Muhammad Afwanil Hakim | | | 1 | 1 |
| 93 | (Italy) Matteo Massetti | | | 1 | 1 |
| 93 | (Italy) David Salutt | | | 1 | 1 |
| 93 | (Lithuania) Danielius Beržanskis | | | 1 | 1 |
| 93 | (Lithuania) Domas Paksys | | | 1 | 1 |
| 93 | (Malaysia) Damien Ling | | | 1 | 1 |
| 93 | (Malaysia) Irfan Shazmir | | | 1 | 1 |
| 93 | (Norway) Torjus Flaaten | | | 1 | 1 |
| 93 | (Norway) Jonas Østhassel | | | 1 | 1 |
| 93 | (Serbia) Andrija Doder | | | 1 | 1 |
| 93 | (Serbia) Sergej Lukic | | | 1 | 1 |
| 93 | (Sweden) Jakob Ekman | | | 1 | 1 |
| 93 | (Sweden) Oscar Reuterhäll | | | 1 | 1 |
| 93 | (United Arab Emirates) Dev Ayyappan | | | 1 | 1 |
| 93 | (United Arab Emirates) Dhiren Ayyappan | | | 1 | 1 |
| 93 | (United States) Kathiravun Manivannan | | | 1 | 1 |
| 93 | (United States) Mukil Nambikumar | | | 1 | 1 |

==== Women's doubles ====
| Rank | Players | IC | IS | FS | Total |
|---|---|---|---|---|---|
| 1 | (Canada) Jackie Dent | 3 | | | 3 |
| 1 | (Canada) Crystal Lai | 3 | | | 3 |
| 3 | (Germany) Stine Küspert | 2 | | 1 | 3 |
| 3 | (Germany) Isabel Lohau | 2 | | 1 | 3 |
| 5 | (Chinese Taipei) Hsieh Mi-yen | 1 | 2 | | 3 |
| 5 | (Chinese Taipei) Yu Chien-hui | 1 | 2 | | 3 |
| 7 | (Chinese Taipei) Hsieh Chih-ying | | 3 | | 3 |
| 7 | (Chinese Taipei) Lee Yu-hsuan | | 3 | | 3 |
| 9 | (Chinese Taipei) Chen Hsin-tung | | 1 | 2 | 3 |
| 9 | (Chinese Taipei) Chen Yu-hsi | | 1 | 2 | 3 |
| 11 | (Ukraine) Maria Koriagina | | | 3 | 3 |
| 11 | (Ukraine) Yaroslava Vantsarovska | | | 3 | 3 |
| 13 | (England) Abbygael Harris | 2 | | | 2 |
| 13 | (Japan) Mikoto Aiso | 2 | | | 2 |
| 13 | (Japan) Momoha Niimi | 2 | | | 2 |
| 13 | (Japan) Mei Sudo | 2 | | | 2 |
| 13 | (Japan) Miku Sugiyama | 2 | | | 2 |
| 13 | (Japan) Mai Tanabe | 2 | | | 2 |
| 13 | (South Korea) Lee Seung-hee | 2 | | | 2 |
| 13 | (South Korea) Park Min-ji | 2 | | | 2 |
| 21 | (Denmark) Simona Pilgaard | 1 | 1 | | 2 |
| 22 | (Denmark) Signe Schulz | | 2 | | 2 |
| 22 | (Guatemala) Diana Corleto | | 2 | | 2 |
| 22 | (Guatemala) Nikté Sotomayor | | 2 | | 2 |
| 25 | (Individual Neutral Athletes) Anastasiia Boiarun | | 1 | 1 | 2 |
| 25 | (Individual Neutral Athletes) Daria Kharlampovich | | 1 | 1 | 2 |
| 25 | (Netherlands) Meerte Loos | | 1 | 1 | 2 |
| 25 | (Peru) Naomi Junco | | 1 | 1 | 2 |
| 25 | (Peru) Namie Miyahira | | 1 | 1 | 2 |
| 25 | (South Korea) Kim So-hee | | 1 | 1 | 2 |
| 25 | (South Korea) Yeon Seo-yeon | | 1 | 1 | 2 |
| 32 | (Australia) Gronya Somerville | 1 | | | 1 |
| 32 | (Brazil) Jaqueline Lima | 1 | | | 1 |
| 32 | (Brazil) Sâmia Lima | 1 | | | 1 |
| 32 | (Brazil) Sânia Lima | 1 | | | 1 |
| 32 | (Brazil) Juliana Viana Vieira | 1 | | | 1 |
| 32 | (Canada) Josephine Wu | 1 | | | 1 |
| 32 | (China) Liu Jiayue | 1 | | | 1 |
| 32 | (China) Wang Zimeng | 1 | | | 1 |
| 32 | (Chinese Taipei) Liao Jui-chi | 1 | | | 1 |
| 32 | (Chinese Taipei) Lin Yen-yu | 1 | | | 1 |
| 32 | (Denmark) Amalie Cecilie Kudsk | 1 | | | 1 |
| 32 | (England) Lizzie Tolman | 1 | | | 1 |
| 32 | (England) Estelle van Leeuwen | 1 | | | 1 |
| 32 | (India) Gayatri Gopichand | 1 | | | 1 |
| 32 | (India) Treesa Jolly | 1 | | | 1 |
| 32 | (India) Rutaparna Panda | 1 | | | 1 |
| 32 | (India) Swetaparna Panda | 1 | | | 1 |
| 32 | (India) Kavipriya Selvam | 1 | | | 1 |
| 32 | (India) Simran Singhi | 1 | | | 1 |
| 32 | (Indonesia) Lanny Tria Mayasari | 1 | | | 1 |
| 32 | (Indonesia) Ester Nurumi Tri Wardoyo | 1 | | | 1 |
| 32 | (Japan) Himeka Hashimura | 1 | | | 1 |
| 32 | (Japan) Mao Hatasue | 1 | | | 1 |
| 32 | (Japan) Arisa Ishida | 1 | | | 1 |
| 32 | (Japan) Rui Kiyama | 1 | | | 1 |
| 32 | (Japan) Mio Konegawa | 1 | | | 1 |
| 32 | (Japan) Kanano Muroya | 1 | | | 1 |
| 32 | (Japan) Akari Sato | 1 | | | 1 |
| 32 | (Japan) Nana Takahashi | 1 | | | 1 |
| 32 | (Japan) Natsumi Takasaki | 1 | | | 1 |
| 32 | (Japan) An Uesugi | 1 | | | 1 |
| 32 | (Japan) Mao Yamakita | 1 | | | 1 |
| 32 | (Japan) Sona Yonemoto | 1 | | | 1 |
| 32 | (South Korea) Jung Kyung-eun | 1 | | | 1 |
| 32 | (South Korea) Kim So-yeong | 1 | | | 1 |
| 32 | (South Korea) Kim Yu-jung | 1 | | | 1 |
| 32 | (South Korea) Lee Yu-lim | 1 | | | 1 |
| 32 | (South Korea) Moon In-seo | 1 | | | 1 |
| 32 | (South Korea) Park Seul | 1 | | | 1 |
| 32 | (Thailand) Phattharin Aiamvareesrisakul | 1 | | | 1 |
| 32 | (Thailand) Sarisa Janpeng | 1 | | | 1 |
| 32 | (United States) Lauren Lam | 1 | | | 1 |
| 32 | (United States) Allison Lee | 1 | | | 1 |
| 75 | (Chinese Taipei) Lin Chih-chun | | 1 | | 1 |
| 75 | (Chinese Taipei) Yang Chu-yun | | 1 | | 1 |
| 75 | (Cuba) Leyanis Contreras | | 1 | | 1 |
| 75 | (Cuba) Taymara Oropesa | | 1 | | 1 |
| 75 | (England) Lisa Curtin | | 1 | | 1 |
| 75 | (England) Yulia Tang | | 1 | | 1 |
| 75 | (Germany) Leona Michalski | | 1 | | 1 |
| 75 | (Ghana) Moslena Adu | | 1 | | 1 |
| 75 | (Ghana) Rachael Quarcoo | | 1 | | 1 |
| 75 | (India) Akshita Manral | | 1 | | 1 |
| 75 | (India) Ishita Negi | | 1 | | 1 |
| 75 | (Malaysia) Low Zi Yu | | 1 | | 1 |
| 75 | (Malaysia) Noraqilah Maisarah | | 1 | | 1 |
| 75 | (Netherlands) Debora Jille | | 1 | | 1 |
| 75 | (Senegal) Maryame Cisse | | 1 | | 1 |
| 75 | (Senegal) Yandé Sene | | 1 | | 1 |
| 75 | (South Africa) Amy Ackerman | | 1 | | 1 |
| 75 | (South Africa) Johanita Scholtz | | 1 | | 1 |
| 75 | (South Korea) Jang Min-yoon | | 1 | | 1 |
| 75 | (South Korea) Kim Bo-min | | 1 | | 1 |
| 75 | (Thailand) Tidapron Kleebyeesun | | 1 | | 1 |
| 75 | (Thailand) Nattamon Laisuan | | 1 | | 1 |
| 75 | (United States) Sydney Li | | 1 | | 1 |
| 75 | (United States) Katelin Ngo | | 1 | | 1 |
| 99 | (Individual Neutral Athletes) Maryna Yanbayeva | | | 1 | 1 |
| 99 | (Individual Neutral Athletes) Sofiya Yanouskaya | | | 1 | 1 |
| 99 | (Bolivia) Camila Lucero Mullisaca Quispe | | | 1 | 1 |
| 99 | (Bolivia) Juanita Siviora | | | 1 | 1 |
| 99 | (Brazil) Tamires Santos | | | 1 | 1 |
| 99 | (Brazil) Ana Júlia Ywata | | | 1 | 1 |
| 99 | (Denmark) Maria Søgård Andersen | | | 1 | 1 |
| 99 | (Denmark) Anne Fuglsang | | | 1 | 1 |
| 99 | (Denmark) Emma Jonassen | | | 1 | 1 |
| 99 | (Denmark) Laura Fløj Thomsen | | | 1 | 1 |
| 99 | (Denmark) Rebecca Thorup | | | 1 | 1 |
| 99 | (Denmark) Marie Viscovich | | | 1 | 1 |
| 99 | (Dominican Republic) Alissa Acosta | | | 1 | 1 |
| 99 | (Dominican Republic) Daniela Acosta | | | 1 | 1 |
| 99 | (Dominican Republic) Nairoby Abigail Jiménez | | | 1 | 1 |
| 99 | (Dominican Republic) Clarisa Pie | | | 1 | 1 |
| 99 | (Estonia) Catlyn Kruus | | | 1 | 1 |
| 99 | (Estonia) Ramona Üprus | | | 1 | 1 |
| 99 | (France) Lily Gautier | | | 1 | 1 |
| 99 | (France) Manon Heitzmann | | | 1 | 1 |
| 99 | (India) Sonali Singh | | | 1 | 1 |
| 99 | (India) Ritika Thaker | | | 1 | 1 |
| 99 | (Republic of Ireland) Orla Flynn | | | 1 | 1 |
| 99 | (Republic of Ireland) Siofra Flynn | | | 1 | 1 |
| 99 | (Japan) Meisa Anami | | | 1 | 1 |
| 99 | (Japan) Aoi Banno | | | 1 | 1 |
| 99 | (Japan) Ria Haga | | | 1 | 1 |
| 99 | (Japan) Yuzu Ueno | | | 1 | 1 |
| 99 | (Netherlands) Kirsten de Wit | | | 1 | 1 |
| 99 | (Peru) Ariana Munar | | | 1 | 1 |
| 99 | (Peru) Fernanda Munar | | | 1 | 1 |

==== Mixed doubles ====
| Rank | Players | IC | IS | FS | Total |
|---|---|---|---|---|---|
| 1 | (Brazil) Sânia Lima | 3 | | | 3 |
| 1 | (Brazil) Davi Silva | 3 | | | 3 |
| 3 | (Denmark) Sofie Røjkjær | 2 | 1 | | 3 |
| 3 | (Denmark) Jeppe Søby | 2 | 1 | | 3 |
| 5 | (Germany) Emma Moszczynski | | 2 | 1 | 3 |
| 5 | (Germany) Jan Colin Völker | | 2 | 1 | 3 |
| 7 | (Australia) Andika Ramadiansyah | 2 | | | 2 |
| 7 | (Australia) Nozomi Shimizu | 2 | | | 2 |
| 7 | (Individual Neutral Athletes) Rodion Alimov | 2 | | | 2 |
| 7 | (Individual Neutral Athletes) Alina Davletova | 2 | | | 2 |
| 7 | (Denmark) Amalie Cecilie Kudsk | 2 | | | 2 |
| 7 | (Denmark) Jesper Toft | 2 | | | 2 |
| 7 | (France) Natan Begga | 2 | | | 2 |
| 7 | (France) Elsa Jacob | 2 | | | 2 |
| 7 | (India) Ishaan Bhatnagar | 2 | | | 2 |
| 7 | (India) K. Maneesha | 2 | | | 2 |
| 7 | (India) Shruti Mishra | 2 | | | 2 |
| 7 | (India) Dhruv Rawat | 2 | | | 2 |
| 19 | (Indonesia) Muhammad Al Farizi | 1 | 1 | | 2 |
| 19 | (Indonesia) Jessica Maya Rismawardani | 1 | 1 | | 2 |
| 19 | (Thailand) Ratchapol Makkasasithorn | 1 | 1 | | 2 |
| 22 | (Guatemala) Diana Corleto | | 2 | | 2 |
| 22 | (Guatemala) Christopher Martínez | | 2 | | 2 |
| 24 | (Cuba) Roberto Herrera | | 1 | 1 | 2 |
| 24 | (Cuba) Taymara Oropesa | | 1 | 1 | 2 |
| 24 | (Malaysia) Hafiz Hakimi Hashim | | 1 | 1 | 2 |
| 24 | (Malaysia) Lim Xuan | | 1 | 1 | 2 |
| 24 | (South Korea) Park Seung-min | | 1 | 1 | 2 |
| 24 | (South Korea) Yeon Seo-yeon | | 1 | 1 | 2 |
| 30 | (Austria) Serena Au Yeong | | | 2 | 2 |
| 30 | (Denmark) Alexander Pedersen | | | 2 | 2 |
| 30 | (Japan) Ria Haga | | | 2 | 2 |
| 30 | (Japan) Mahiro Oku | | | 2 | 2 |
| 30 | (United Arab Emirates) Dhiren Ayyappan | | | 2 | 2 |
| 30 | (United Arab Emirates) Taabia Khan | | | 2 | 2 |
| 36 | (Algeria) Koceila Mammeri | 1 | | | 1 |
| 36 | (Algeria) Tanina Mammeri | 1 | | | 1 |
| 36 | (Canada) Chloe Hoang | 1 | | | 1 |
| 36 | (Canada) Timothy Lock | 1 | | | 1 |
| 36 | (China) Liao Pinyi | 1 | | | 1 |
| 36 | (China) Zhang Jiahan | 1 | | | 1 |
| 36 | (Chinese Taipei) Chang Yun-jung | 1 | | | 1 |
| 36 | (Chinese Taipei) Lu Chen | 1 | | | 1 |
| 36 | (Denmark) Kristoffer Kolding | 1 | | | 1 |
| 36 | (Denmark) Mette Werge | 1 | | | 1 |
| 36 | (England) Callum Hemming | 1 | | | 1 |
| 36 | (England) Estelle van Leeuwen | 1 | | | 1 |
| 36 | (Hong Kong) Chan Yin Chak | 1 | | | 1 |
| 36 | (Hong Kong) Ng Tsz Yau | 1 | | | 1 |
| 36 | (India) Sathwik Reddy Kanapuram | 1 | | | 1 |
| 36 | (India) Radhika Sharma | 1 | | | 1 |
| 36 | (Indonesia) Dejan Ferdinansyah | 1 | | | 1 |
| 36 | (Indonesia) Rehan Naufal Kusharjanto | 1 | | | 1 |
| 36 | (Indonesia) Melati Daeva Oktavianti | 1 | | | 1 |
| 36 | (Indonesia) Apriyani Rahayu | 1 | | | 1 |
| 36 | (Japan) Mutsuki Ampo | 1 | | | 1 |
| 36 | (Japan) Misaki Kurashima | 1 | | | 1 |
| 36 | (Japan) Nami Matsuyama | 1 | | | 1 |
| 36 | (Japan) Hiroki Midorikawa | 1 | | | 1 |
| 36 | (Japan) Kota Ogawa | 1 | | | 1 |
| 36 | (Japan) Hina Osawa | 1 | | | 1 |
| 36 | (Japan) Maya Taguchi | 1 | | | 1 |
| 36 | (Japan) Yuta Watanabe | 1 | | | 1 |
| 36 | (Malaysia) Goh Boon Zhe | 1 | | | 1 |
| 36 | (Malaysia) Dania Sofea | 1 | | | 1 |
| 36 | (South Korea) Jeong Na-eun | 1 | | | 1 |
| 36 | (South Korea) Jo Song-hyun | 1 | | | 1 |
| 36 | (South Korea) Lee Hyeong-woo | 1 | | | 1 |
| 36 | (South Korea) Park Seul | 1 | | | 1 |
| 36 | (Thailand) Nattamon Laisuan | 1 | | | 1 |
| 71 | (Australia) Supriya Yellapragada | | 1 | | 1 |
| 71 | (Azerbaijan) Keisha Fatimah Azzahra | | 1 | | 1 |
| 71 | (Azerbaijan) Dicky Dwi Pangestu | | 1 | | 1 |
| 71 | (Chinese Taipei) Wu Hsuan-yi | | 1 | | 1 |
| 71 | (Chinese Taipei) Yang Chu-yun | | 1 | | 1 |
| 71 | (Germany) Jonathan Dresp | | 1 | | 1 |
| 71 | (Germany) Selin Hübsch | | 1 | | 1 |
| 71 | (Germany) Justin Seibel | | 1 | | 1 |
| 71 | (Germany) Miranda Wilson | | 1 | | 1 |
| 71 | (India) Zenith Abbigail | | 1 | | 1 |
| 71 | (India) Sathish Karunakaran | | 1 | | 1 |
| 71 | (Jamaica) Joel Angus | | 1 | | 1 |
| 71 | (Jamaica) Tahlia Richardson | | 1 | | 1 |
| 71 | (Malaysia) Genevie Lim | | 1 | | 1 |
| 71 | (Malaysia) Loo Bing Kun | | 1 | | 1 |
| 71 | (Malaysia) Noraqilah Maisarah | | 1 | | 1 |
| 71 | (Malaysia) Irfan Shazmir | | 1 | | 1 |
| 71 | (Mexico) Luis Montoya | | 1 | | 1 |
| 71 | (Mexico) Miriam Rodríguez | | 1 | | 1 |
| 71 | (Netherlands) Andy Buijk | | 1 | | 1 |
| 71 | (Netherlands) Meerte Loos | | 1 | | 1 |
| 71 | (Poland) Kaja Ziółkowska | | 1 | | 1 |
| 71 | (Serbia) Mihajlo Tomić | | 1 | | 1 |
| 71 | (Serbia) Anđela Vitman | | 1 | | 1 |
| 71 | (Slovenia) Miha Ivančič | | 1 | | 1 |
| 71 | (Slovenia) Anja Jordan | | 1 | | 1 |
| 71 | (South Korea) Kim Hye-rin | | 1 | | 1 |
| 71 | (South Korea) Lim Su-min | | 1 | | 1 |
| 71 | (Thailand) Patida Srisawat | | 1 | | 1 |
| 71 | (Ukraine) Yegor Romaniuk | | 1 | | 1 |
| 71 | (United Arab Emirates) Shashaank Sai Munnangi | | 1 | | 1 |
| 102 | (Austria) Ilija Nicolussi | | | 1 | 1 |
| 102 | (Austria) Lena Rumpold | | | 1 | 1 |
| 102 | (Brazil) Marcos Ryan Sousa | | | 1 | 1 |
| 102 | (Brazil) Ana Júlia Ywata | | | 1 | 1 |
| 102 | (Chinese Taipei) Huang Tzu-yuan | | | 1 | 1 |
| 102 | (Chinese Taipei) Kung Chia-yi | | | 1 | 1 |
| 102 | (Colombia) Jeronimo Giraldo | | | 1 | 1 |
| 102 | (Colombia) Juliana Giraldo | | | 1 | 1 |
| 102 | (Dominican Republic) Nairoby Abigail Jiménez | | | 1 | 1 |
| 102 | (Dominican Republic) Yonatan Linarez | | | 1 | 1 |
| 102 | (Estonia) Elisaveta Berik | | | 1 | 1 |
| 102 | (Finland) Ananda Galvani Daniswara | | | 1 | 1 |
| 102 | (Finland) Anton Kaisti | | | 1 | 1 |
| 102 | (Finland) Iina Suutarinen | | | 1 | 1 |
| 102 | (Republic of Ireland) Rachael Darragh | | | 1 | 1 |
| 102 | (Republic of Ireland) Scott Guildea | | | 1 | 1 |
| 102 | (Lithuania) Rokas Lesinskas | | | 1 | 1 |
| 102 | (Malta) Matthew Abela | | | 1 | 1 |
| 102 | (Netherlands) Sterre Bang | | | 1 | 1 |
| 102 | (Netherlands) Joep Strooper | | | 1 | 1 |
| 102 | (Peru) Sharum Durand | | | 1 | 1 |
| 102 | (Peru) Rafaela Munar | | | 1 | 1 |
| 102 | (Poland) Gabriela Skorkowska | | | 1 | 1 |
| 102 | (Switzerland) Julie Franconville | | | 1 | 1 |
| 102 | (Switzerland) Nicolas Franconville | | | 1 | 1 |
| 102 | (Switzerland) Yann Orteu | | | 1 | 1 |
| 102 | (Switzerland) Caroline Racloz | | | 1 | 1 |
| 102 | (Turkey) Buğra Aktaş | | | 1 | 1 |
| 102 | (Turkey) Sinem Yıldız | | | 1 | 1 |
| 102 | (Ukraine) Yaroslava Vantsarovska | | | 1 | 1 |
