= Swiss National Badminton Championships =

The Swiss National Badminton Championships is a tournament organized to crown the best badminton players in Switzerland. The tournament started in 1955 and is held every year.

== Past winners ==
Year	Men's singles	Women's singles	Men's doubles	Women's doubles	Mixed doubles	Team
1955	Robert Baldin	No competition	Tilbert Haberfeld; Edwin Lenzlinger	No competition	No competition	
1956	Robert Baldin	D. Hegar	Tilbert Haberfeld; Edwin Lenzlinger	No competition	Tilbert Haberfeld; D. Hegar	
1957	Jean Mermod	R. Eschenmoser	Jean Mermod; Robert Baldin	No competition	Erwin Oeler; Gertrud Oeler	
1958	Jean Mermod	R. Eschenmoser	Jean Mermod; Robert Baldin	No competition	Erwin Oeler; Vreni Schkölzinger	
1959	Jean Mermod	L. Füller	Jean Mermod; Robert Baldin	No competition	C. Böhler; R. Eschenmoser	
1960	Francis Colomb	S. Böhler	Jean Mermod; Robert Baldin	No competition	C. Böhler; S. Böhler	
1961	Francis Colomb	L. Füller	Francis Colomb; Heinz Honegger	No competition	Tilbert Haberfeld; S. Conzett	
1962	Heinz Honegger	M. Poffet	Jürg Honegger; Heinz Honegger	No competition	H. P. Conzett; D. Hörnlimann	
1963	Jürg Honegger	L. Füller	Jürg Honegger; Heinz Honegger	No competition	E. Schneider; E. Häner	
1964	Heinz Honegger	Hedi Müller	Jürg Honegger; Heinz Honegger	S. Grob; L. Füller	E. Schneider; E. Häner	
1965	Heinz Honegger	Vreni Schkölzinger	A. Bodmer; H. P. Conzett	Vreni Schkolzinger; Hedi Müller	A. Bodmer; Hedi Müller	
1966	Heinz Honegger	Vreni Schkölzinger	Jürg Honegger; Heinz Honegger	Vreni Schkölzinger; Hedi Müller	Anton Sauter; Vreni Schkölzinger	
1967	Jürg Honegger	Vreni Schkölzinger	Jürg Honegger; Heinz Honegger	Vreni Schkölzinger; U. Wanner	Anton Sauter; Vreni Schkölzinger	
1968	Jürg Honegger	Vreni Schkölzinger	Jürg Honegger; Heinz Honegger	Vreni Schkölzinger; U. Wanner	Anton Sauter; Vreni Schkölzinger	
1969	Hubert Riedo	S. Conzett	Jürg Honegger; Heinz Honegger	José Carrel; U. Wanner	E. Schneider; S. Conzett	
1970	Anton Sauter	Vreni Schkolzinger	Jürg Honegger; Heinz Honegger	Vreni Schkölzinger; José Carrel	Heinz Honegger; Vreni Schkölzinger	
1971	Hubert Riedo	José Carrel	Edy Andrey; Hubert Riedo	Mireille Drapel; José Carrel	Heinz Honegger; Vreni Schkölzinger	
1972	Hubert Riedo	D. Künzler	Edy Andrey; Hubert Riedo	D. Künzler; Bohlen	Edy Andrey; Liselotte Blumer	
1973	Edy Andrey	Liselotte Blumer	Edy Andrey; Hubert Riedo	Liselotte Blumer; Claudia von Büren	Hubert Riedo; B. Geser	
1974	Edy Andrey	Liselotte Blumer	Edy Andrey; Hubert Riedo	Liselotte Blumer; Claudia von Büren	Edy Andrey; Liselotte Blumer	
1975	Edy Andrey	Liselotte Blumer	Edy Andrey; Hubert Riedo	Liselotte Blumer; Mireille Drapel	Edy Andrey; Liselotte Blumer	
1976	Edy Andrey	Liselotte Blumer	Claude Heiniger; Roland Heiniger	Liselotte Blumer; Mireille Drapel	Edy Andrey; Liselotte Blumer	
1977	Edy Andrey	Liselotte Blumer	Claude Heiniger; Roland Heiniger	Liselotte Blumer; Mireille Drapel	Edy Andrey; Liselotte Blumer	
1978	Edy Andrey	Liselotte Blumer	Claude Heiniger; Roland Heiniger	Liselotte Blumer; Mireille Drapel	Edy Andrey; Liselotte Blumer	
1979	Claude Heiniger	Liselotte Blumer	Claude Heiniger; Roland Heiniger	Liselotte Blumer; Patricia Kaul	Edy Andrey; Liselotte Blumer	
1980	Claude Heiniger	Liselotte Blumer	Claude Heiniger; Roland Heiniger	Liselotte Blumer; Mireille Drapel	Dieter Blumer; Liselotte Blumer	
1981	Paolo De Paoli	Liselotte Blumer	Claude Heiniger; Roland Heiniger	Liselotte Blumer; Mireille Drapel	Dieter Blumer; Liselotte Blumer	
1982	Pascal Kaul	Liselotte Blumer	Laurent Kuhnert; Paolo De Paoli	Liselotte Blumer; Mireille Drapel	Dieter Blumer; Liselotte Blumer	
1983	Pascal Kaul	Liselotte Blumer	Pierre Duboux; Pascal Kaul	Liselotte Blumer; Mireille Drapel	Dieter Blumer; Liselotte Blumer	
1984	Pierre Duboux	Liselotte Blumer	Michael Althaus; Thomas Althaus	Liselotte Blumer; Rita Lutz	Dieter Blumer; Liselotte Blumer	
1985	Pascal Kaul	Liselotte Blumer	Michael Althaus; Thomas Althaus	Liselotte Blumer; Patricia Werner	Michael Althaus; Iris Kaufmann	
1986	Thomas Althaus	Liselotte Blumer	Hubert Müller; Werner Riesen	Liselotte Blumer; Rita Lutz	Hubert Müller; Nicole Zahno	
1987	Thomas Althaus	Liselotte Blumer	Yvan Philip; Pascal Kaul	Liselotte Blumer; Patricia Werner	Daniel Hanggi; Liselotte Blumer	
1988	Thomas Althaus	Bettina Villars	Yvan Philip; Stephen Dietrich	Maja Baumgartner; Bettina Gfeller	Thomas Althaus; Bettina Villars	
1989	Thomas Althaus	Bettina Villars	Laurent Jaquenoud; Jorge Rodríguez	Liselotte Blumer; Iria Gerstenkorn	Thomas Althaus; Bettina Villars	
1990	Thomas Wapp	Bettina Villars	Hubert Müller; Christian Nyffenegger	Silvia Albrecht; Sarah Horing	Thomas Althaus; Bettina Villars	
1991	No competition					Basel
1992	Christian Nyffenegger	Bettina Villars	Remy Matthey de l'Etang; Thomas Wapp	Silvia Albrecht; Bettina Gfeller	Thomas Althaus; Bettina Villars	Basel
1993	Thomas Wapp	Silvia Albrecht	Remy Matthey de l'Etang; Thomas Wapp	Liselotte Blumer; Silvia Albrecht	Lawrence Chew Si Hock; Santi Wibowo	
1994	Thomas Wapp	Liselotte Blumer	Lawrence Chew Si Hock; Jorge Rodríguez	Yvonne Naef; Santi Wibowo	Lawrence Chew Si Hock; Santi Wibowo	
1995	Thomas Wapp	Bettina Villars	Christian Nyffenegger; Thomas Wapp	Silvia Albrecht; Santi Wibowo	Robert de Kock; Santi Wibowo	
1996	Thomas Wapp	Silvia Albrecht	Thomas Wapp; Lawrence Chew Si Hock	Silvia Albrecht; Santi Wibowo	Jorge Rodríguez; Silvia Albrecht	
1997	Thomas Wapp	Santi Wibowo	Thomas Wapp; Stephan Wapp	Fabienne Baumeyer; Shefali Rolf	Stephan Wapp; Santi Wibowo	
1998	Thomas Wapp	Santi Wibowo	Thomas Wapp; Stephan Wapp	Santi Wibowo; Judith Baumeyer	Morten Bundgaard-Hansen; Silvia Albrecht	
1999	Thomas Wapp	Santi Wibowo	Morten Bundgaard; Remy Matthey de l'Etang	Santi Wibowo; Judith Baumeyer	Morten Bundgaard; Santi Wibowo	
2000	Thomas Wapp	Santi Wibowo	Morten Bundgaard; Remy Matthey de l'Etang	Fabienne Baumeyer; Corinne Jörg	Pascal Bircher; Fabienne Baumeyer	
2001	Thomas Wapp	Judith Baumeyer	Pascal Bircher; Remy Matthey de l'Etang	Judith Baumeyer; Santi Wibowo	Pascal Bircher; Santi Wibowo	BC La Chaux de Fonds
2002	Paolo von Scala	Santi Wibowo	Elias Wieland; Pascal Bircher	Santi Wibowo; Judith Baumeyer	Pascal Bircher; Fabienne Baumeyer	BC La Chaux de Fonds
2003	Christian Unternährer	Jeanine Cicognini	Pascal Bircher; Philipp Kurz	Fabienne Baumeyer; Judith Baumeyer	Santi Wibowo; Paolo von Scala	Team Basel
2004	Olivier Andrey	Jeanine Cicognini	Roman Trepp; Jon Lindholm	Corinne Jörg; Jeanine Cicognini	Pascal Bircher; Fabienne Baumeyer	Team Basel
2005	Olivier Andrey	Corinne Jörg	Christian Bösiger; Michael Andrey	Corinne Jörg; Anke Fritschi	Markus Hegar; Anke Fritschi	Team Basel
2006	Olivier Andrey	Jeanine Cicognini	Christian Bösiger; Michael Andrey	Jeanine Cicognini; Ornella Dumartheray	Anthony Dumartheray; Sabrina Jaquet	Team Basel
2007	Christian Bösiger	Jeanine Cicognini	Michael Andrey; Christian Bösiger	Corinne Jörg; Sabrina Jaquet	Anthony Dumartheray; Sabrina Jaquet	BC La Chaux de Fonds
2008	Olivier Andrey	Monika Fischer	Roman Kunz; Simon Enkerli	Corinne Jörg; Sabrina Jaquet	Anthony Dumartheray; Sabrina Jaquet	Team Basel
2009	Christian Bösiger	Jeanine Cicognini	Christian Bösiger; Anthony Dumartheray	Corinne Jörg; Sabrina Jaquet	Anthony Dumartheray; Sabrina Jaquet	BV Adliswil Zürich
2010	Olivier Andrey	Jeanine Cicognini	Christian Bösiger; Anthony Dumartheray	Corinne Jörg; Sabrina Jaquet	Anthony Dumartheray; Sabrina Jaquet	BV St.Gallen-Appenzell
2011	Christian Bösiger	Jeanine Cicognini	Christian Bösiger; Anthony Dumartheray	Sabrina Jaquet; Ornella Dumartheray	Anthony Dumartheray; Sabrina Jaquet	
2012	Christian Bösiger	Nicole Schaller	Christian Bösiger; Anthony Dumartheray	Sabrina Jaquet; Ornella Dumartheray	Anthony Dumartheray; Sabrina Jaquet	
2013	Anthony Dumartheray	Sabrina Jaquet	Florian Schmid; Gilles Tripet	Sabrina Jaquet; Ornella Dumartheray	Anthony Dumartheray; Sabrina Jaquet	
2014	Olivier Andrey	Sabrina Jaquet	Anthony Dumartheray; Thomas Heiniger	Ayla Huser; Sabrina Jaquet	Anthony Dumartheray; Sabrina Jaquet	
2015	Christoph Heiniger	Sabrina Jaquet	Mathias Bonny; Oliver Schaller	Ayla Huser; Sabrina Jaquet	Anthony Dumartheray; Sabrina Jaquet	
2016	Christian Bösiger	Sabrina Jaquet	Anthony Dumartheray; Thomas Heiniger	Ayla Huser; Sabrina Jaquet	Anthony Dumartheray; Sabrina Jaquet	
2017	Dominik Bütikofer	Sabrina Jaquet	Anthony Dumartheray; Thomas Heiniger	Ayla Huser; Sabrina Jaquet	Oliver Schaller; Céline Burkart	
2018	Christian Kirchmayr	Sabrina Jaquet	Oliver Schaller; Mathias Bonny	Céline Burkart; Nicole Schaller	Oliver Schaller; Céline Burkart	
2019	Tobias Künzi	Sabrina Jaquet	Florian Schmid; Gilles Tripet	Aline Müller; Jenjira Stadelmann	Oliver Schaller; Céline Burkhart	
2020	Tobias Künzi	Sabrina Jaquet	Dominik Bütikofer; Thomas Heiniger	Aline Müller; Jenjira Stadelmann	Oliver Schaller; Céline Burkart	
2021	Tobias Künzi	Jenjira Stadelmann	Tobias Künzi; Nicolas A. Müller	Aline Müller; Jenjira Stadelmann	Mathias Bonny; Céline Burkart	
2022	Nicolas A. Müller	Ronja Stern	Mathias Bonny; Gilles Tripet	Nadia Fankhauser; Caroline Racloz	Nicolas A. Müller; Ronja Stern	
2023	Tobias Künzi	Jenjira Stadelmann	Oliver Schaller; Andreas Zbinden	Céline Burkart; Nicole Schaller	Minh Quang Pham; Caroline Racloz	
2024	Julien Scheiwiller	Milena Schnider	Nicolas Franconville; Yann Orteu	Cloé Brand; Julie Franconville	Oliver Schaller; Nicole Schaller	
2025	Julien Scheiwiller	Julie Franconville	David Orteu; Maxime Pierrehumbert	Lucie Amiguet; Caroline Racloz	Nicolas Franconville; Aline Müller	
2026	Nicolas A. Müller	Dounia Pelupessy	David Orteu; Maxime Pierrehumbert	Lucie Amiguet; Caroline Racloz	Yann Orteu; Caroline Racloz	
