= Jeanine Cicognini =

Personal information
- Born: 14 November 1986 (age 39) Brig, Valais, Switzerland
- Height: 1.72 m (5 ft 8 in)
- Weight: 67 kg (148 lb)

Sport
- Country: Switzerland; Italy
- Sport: Badminton
- Handedness: Right
- Coached by: Arturo Ruiz

Women's singles & doubles
- Highest ranking: 33 (WS 16 September 2010); 109 (WD 22 October 2009)
- BWF profile
Medal record
Women's badminton
Representing Switzerland
European Junior Championships
| Silver medal – second place | 2005 Den Bosch | Girls' singles |

Jeanine Cicognini (born 14 November 1986) is a Swiss badminton player who now represents Italy. Cicognini won her first Swiss senior title at age 16 and has since won the award seven more times.

== Biography ==
In 2005, she won the silver medal at the European Junior Badminton Championships in the girls' singles event.

Cicognini became a badminton professional as soon as she left school. She soon moved to Denmark, and then moved to the International Badminton Federation's training centre in Saarbrücken, Germany. In 2010, she returned to Switzerland and joined the sport army, where she played for the BC Uzwil. She later moved to Mülheim an der Ruhr, Germany and played for the 1.BV Mülheim in the first bundesliga.

At the Olympic Games 2008 in Beijing she reached the second round, losing to Anna Rice of Canada. In 2016, she did not advance to the elimination round after placing third in the group stage.

In 2015, she represented Italy to compete at the European Games in the women's singles event. She was defeated by Line Kjærsfeldt of Denmark 21-10, 25-23 in round of 16.

== Achievements ==
=== European Junior Championships ===
Girls' singles
| Year | Venue | Opponent | Score | Result |
|---|---|---|---|---|
| 2005 | De Maaspoort; Den Bosch, Netherlands | (Germany) Janet Köhler | 5–11, 9–11 | Silver |

=== BWF International Challenge/Series ===
Women's singles
| Year | Tournament | Opponent | Score | Result |
|---|---|---|---|---|
| 2003 | Le Volant d'Or de Toulouse | (Denmark) Tine Rasmussen | 3–11, 3–11 | (silver) Runner-up |
| 2005 | Bulgarian International | (Bulgaria) Petya Nedelcheva | 7–11, 2–11 | (silver) Runner-up` |
| 2007 | Hungarian International | (Iceland) Ragna Ingólfsdóttir | 13–21, 18–21 | (silver) Runner-up |
| 2009 | Czech International | (India) Trupti Murgunde | 17–21, 12–21 | (silver) Runner-up |
| 2009 | Hungarian International | (Russia) Tatjana Bibik | 22–20, 21–12 | (gold) Winner |
| 2011 | Guatemala International | (Canada) Michelle Li | 15–21, 13–21 | (silver) Runner-up |
| 2012 | Uganda International | (Turkey) Özge Bayrak | 21–14, 14–10, retired | (gold) Winner |
| 2014 | Giraldilla International | (Belgium) Marie Demy | 21–19, 21–13 | (gold) Winner |
| 2014 | Lagos International | (Slovakia) Martina Repiská | 21–10, 21–9 | (gold) Winner |
| 2014 | Mauritius International | (Austria) Elisabeth Baldauf | 21–18, 21–10 | (gold) Winner |
| 2014 | Kenya International | (Nigeria) Grace Gabriel | 21–16, 13–21, 21–16 | (gold) Winner |
| 2014 | Guatemala International | (United States) Crystal Pan | 11–2, 11–6, 3–11, 11–5 | (gold) Winner |
| 2015 | Trinidad and Tobago International | (Austria) Elisabeth Baldauf | 21–16, 16–21, 10–21 | (silver) Runner-up |
| 2015 | Colombia International | (Brazil) Fabiana Silva | 21–15, 12–21, 21–13 | (gold) Winner |
| 2015 | New Caledonia International | (Australia) Joy Lai | 21–17, 21–15 | (gold) Winner |
| 2015 | Puerto Rico International | (Hungary) Laura Sárosi | 12–21, 16–21 | (silver) Runner-up |
| 2016 | Manhattan Beach International | (Mexico) Haramara Gaitan | 21–16, 22–20 | (gold) Winner |
| 2016 | Jamaica International | (Lithuania) Akvilė Stapušaitytė | 21–16, 22–20 | (gold) Winner |

BWF International Challenge tournament
BWF International Series tournament
BWF Future Series tournament
