= Liselotte Blumer =

Swiss badminton player (born 1957)

Personal information
- Born: August 8, 1957 (age 69) Basel, Switzerland
- Height: 1.62 m (5 ft 4 in)
- Weight: 56 kg (123 lb)

Sport
- Country: Switzerland
- Sport: Badminton
- Handedness: Right
- BWF profile
Medal record
Women's Badminton
Representing Switzerland
European Championships
Gold medal – first place	1980 Groningen	Singles

Liselotte Blumer (born 8 August 1957) is a retired female badminton player from Switzerland.

== Career ==
In 1980 Blumer was a surprise winner of the women's singles gold medal at the European Badminton Championships. The powerfully built Blumer won the Swiss national women's singles title sixteen times, fifteen of them consecutively between 1973 and 1987, and the Swiss Open women's singles title six times. Her other international titles included the French Open women's doubles, the Polish Open women's singles (1981, 1982), and the Malta International women's singles and doubles (1984).

== Achievements ==
=== European Championships ===
Women's singles
Year	Venue	Opponent	Score	Result
1980	Groningen, Netherlands	(Sweden) Anette Börjesson	11–4, 11–6	Gold

=== International tournaments (11 titles, 2 runners-up) ===
Women's singles
Year	Tournament	Opponent	Score	Result
1975	Swiss Open	(South Africa) Ann Parsons	11–7, 11–4	(gold) Winner
1977	Swiss Open	(Netherlands) Maureen Oskam	12–11, 11–6	(gold) Winner
1979	Swiss Open	(Denmark) Pia Nielsen	11–7, 7–11, 11–4	(gold) Winner
1980	Swiss Open	(Denmark) Bente Terkelsen	11–6, 11–5	(gold) Winner
1981	Polish International	(England) Catharine Troke	11–8, 11–7	(gold) Winner
1981	Swiss Open	(Norway) Else Thoresen	11–4, 11–8	(gold) Winner
1982	Polish International	(East Germany) Monika Cassens	11–4, 4–11, 11–4	(gold) Winner
1983	Swiss Open	(Netherlands) Eline Coene	5–11, 11–7, 10–12	(silver) Runner-up
1984	Malta International	(Belgium) Annick Bouquiaux	11–0, 11–0	(gold) Winner
1984	Swiss Open	(Netherlands) Monique Hoogland	11–5, 11–4	(gold) Winner

Women's doubles
Year	Tournament	Partner	Opponent	Score	Result
1980	French Open	(West Germany) Marieluise Zizmann	(Denmark) Jette Boyer (Denmark) Pia Nielsen	15–1, 15–0	(gold) Winner
1984	Malta International	(France) Corinne Sonnet	(France) Anne Méniane (Austria) Sabine Ploner	15–10, 15–12	(gold) Winner
1984	Swiss Open	(Denmark) Lisbeth Koch	(Netherlands) Erica van Dijck (Netherlands) Monique Hoogland	9–15, 10–15	(silver) Runner-up
