= Malta International =

Badminton tournament held in Malta

The Malta International is an international badminton tournament held in Malta. This tournament has been a Future Series. Maltese National Badminton Championships already started in 1953.

== Winners ==
Year	Men's singles	Women's singles	Men's doubles	Women's doubles	Mixed doubles
1971	(Malta) Kenneth Wain	(England) Barbara Martin	(Malta) Alfred Cefai (Malta) Kenneth Wain	(England) Carrol McKenzie (England) Hazel Tough	(England) John Farmer (England) Barbara Martin
1972	(England) David Jepson	(England) Norma Lovett	(England) David Jepson (England) Buck Ryan	(England) Norma Lovett (England) Patricia Hodson	(England) David Jepson (England) Sandra Jepson
1973	(Denmark) Gert Lazarotti	(Austria) Elisabeth Schechtner	(Denmark) Bert Lazarotti (Denmark) George Hoffmann	(Denmark) Gitte Lynge (Denmark) Joana Fagerlund	(Austria) Berthold Auer (Austria) Elisabeth Schechtner
1974	(Denmark) Frank Andersen	(Denmark) Jette Moberg	(Denmark) Frank Andersen (Denmark) Peter Morck	(Denmark) Jette Moberg (Denmark) Suzanne Pilegaard	(Denmark) Frank Andersen (Denmark) Jette Moberg
1975	(Denmark) Peter Morck	(Denmark) Suzanne Pilegaard	(Austria) Alfred Hofer (Austria) Dieter Hofer	(Denmark) Charlotte Andersen (Denmark) Suzanne Pilegaard	(Austria) Alfred Hofer (England) Pat Smiles
1976	(Austria) Alfred Hofer	(England) Pat Smiles	(Malta) Alfred Cefai (Malta) Kenneth Wain	(Malta) Carmen Worley (Malta) Doreen Cann	(Austria) Alfred Hofer (England) Pat Smiles
1977	No competition				
1978	(West Germany) Axel Rosenow	(Malta) Joyce Abdilla	(Austria) Werner Langthaler (Austria) Gerhard Brandl	(Malta) Joyce Abdilla (Malta) Marcelle Micallef	(West Germany) Axel Rosenow (West Germany) Marion Rosenow
1979	(West Germany) Axel Rosenow	(Malta) Joyce Abdilla	(Malta) Vincent Curmi (Malta) Paul Vella	(Malta) Joyce Abdilla (Malta) Marcelle Micallef	(West Germany) Axel Rosenow (West Germany) Marion Rosenow
1980	(West Germany) Joachim Reiche	(West Germany) Claudia Steidler	(West Germany) Joachim Reiche (West Germany) D. Werntz	(West Germany) Claudia Steidler (West Germany) Marion Rosenow	(West Germany) Axel Rosenow (West Germany) Marion Rosenow
1981	(England) David Eddy	(Malta) Muriel Cain	(Denmark) L. Merrild (Denmark) M. Mogensen	(Malta) Muriel Cain (Malta) Pauline Kennish	(Denmark) M. Morgensen (Denmark) H. Karlsson
1982	(Netherlands) Clemens Wortel	(Malta) Muriel Cain	(Malta) P. Mead (Malta) P. Cannel	(Malta) Muriel Cain (Malta) Pauline Kennish	(Denmark) C. D. Lichtenberg (Denmark) L. Riiser
1983	(England) David Eddy	(Malta) Muriel Cain	(England) David Eddy (England) Chris Baxter	(Malta) Muriel Cain (Malta) Pauline Kennish	(Netherlands) Clemens Wortel (Netherlands) Barbara Kolander
1984	(Austria) Tariq Farooq	(Switzerland) Liselotte Blumer	(Denmark) B. Krammer (Denmark) J. Thau	(Switzerland) Liselotte Blumer (France) Corinne Sonnet	(Denmark) Martin Skovgaard (Denmark) Anette Larsen
1985	(Denmark) Martin Skovgaard	(Denmark) Bente Hansen	(Denmark) Martin Skovgaard (Denmark) Henrik Neergaard	(England) Debbie Buddle (Denmark) Jane Banham	(Denmark) Martin Skovgaard (Denmark) Anette Larsen
1986	(Netherlands) Denis Tjin-Asjoe	(Switzerland) Doris Gerstenkorn	(Denmark) Martin Skovgaard (Denmark) Jens Moller Madsen	(Austria) Helga Schönbauer (Austria) Heidemarie Himsl	(England) Andrew Mickleborough (England) Pauline Guest
1987	(Switzerland) Hubert Müller	(England) Alison Fisher	(Denmark) Martin Skovgaard (Denmark) Jens Moller Madsen	(England) Alison Fisher (Netherlands) Carol Liem	(Netherlands) Arless Tjin Asjoe (Netherlands) Carol Liem
1988	(Finland) Tony Tuominen	(England) Alison Fisher	(Switzerland) Thomas Althaus (Switzerland) Hubert Müller	(Bulgaria) Diana Koleva (Austria) Andrea Roschinsky	(Switzerland) Thomas Althaus (Switzerland) Charlotte Pederson
1989	(Austria) Klaus Fischer	(Bulgaria) Diana Koleva	(Austria) Klaus Fischer (Austria) Heinz Fischer	(Bulgaria) Diana Koleva (Bulgaria) Emilia Dimitrova	(Bulgaria) Vladimir Balun (Bulgaria) Emilia Dimitrova
1990	(Denmark) Claus Thomsen	(West Germany) Mira Sundari	(Denmark) Michael Søgaard (Denmark) Martin Skovgaard	(East Germany) Monika Cassens (East Germany) Petra Michalowsky	(West Germany) Michael Keck (West Germany) Mira Sundari
1991	No competition				
1992	(Czech Republic) Tomasz Mendrek	(Austria) Irina Serova	(Germany) Kai Abraham (Austria) Heinz Fischer	(Bulgaria) Diana Koleva (Bulgaria) Diana Filipova	(Germany) Kai Abraham (Austria) Sabine Ploner
1993– 2021	No competition				
2022	(Azerbaijan) Ade Resky Dwicahyo	(Indonesia) Gabriela Meilani Moningka	(Germany) Jarne Schlevoigt (Germany) Nikolaj Stupplich	(Netherlands) Kirsten de Wit (Netherlands) Alyssa Tirtosentono	(Germany) Malik Bourakkadi (Germany) Leona Michalski
2023	No competition				
2024	(Austria) Collins Valentine Filimon	(Indonesia) Aurelia Salsabila	(Norway) Torjus Flåtten (Norway) Vegard Rikheim	(Denmark) Anna-Sofie Nielsen (Denmark) Frederikke Nielsen	(Ukraine) Viacheslav Yakovlev (Ukraine) Polina Tkach
2025	(South Korea) Yoo Tae-bin	(Germany) Miranda Wilson	(Chinese Taipei) Chen Sheng-fa (Chinese Taipei) Lu Chen	(Poland) Anastasia Khomich (Poland) Ulyana Volskaya	(France) Louis Lefevre (France) Carla Martinez
2026	(Poland) Dominik Kwinta	(United Arab Emirates) Prakriti Bharath	(England) Robin Harper (England) Harry Wakefield	(Republic of Ireland) Orla Flynn (Republic of Ireland) Siofra Flynn	(United Arab Emirates) Dhiren Ayyappan (United Arab Emirates) Taabia Khan

== Performances by nation ==
As of the 2026 edition

Pos	Nation	MS	WS	MD	WD	XD	Total
1	Denmark	5	3	8	4.5	5	25.5
2	England	3	5	3	3	4	18
3	Malta	1	5	4	6	0	16
4	West Germany; Germany	3	3	2.5	1	5.5	15
5	Austria	4	2	3.5	1.5	2.5	13.5
6	Netherlands	2			1.5	2	5.5
6	Switzerland	1	2	1	0.5	1	5.5
8	Bulgaria		1		2.5	1	4.5
9	Indonesia		2				2
9	Poland	1			1		2
9	United Arab Emirates		1			1	2
12	France				0.5	1	1.5
13	Azerbaijan	1					1
13	Chinese Taipei			1			1
13	Czech Republic	1					1
13	East Germany				1		1
13	Finland	1					1
13	Norway			1			1
13	Ireland				1		1
13	South Korea	1					1
13	Ukraine					1	1
Total		24	24	24	24	24	120
