= Anthony Dumartheray =

Swiss badminton player (born 1988)

Personal information
- Born: 2 August 1988 (age 38)
- Height: 1.78 m (5 ft 10 in)

Sport
- Country: Switzerland
- Sport: Badminton

Men's
- Highest ranking: 156 (MS) 3 May 2012; 91 (MD) 17 Jul 2014; 37 (XD) 18 Oct 2012
- BWF profile

Anthony Dumartheray (born 2 August 1988) is a Swiss male badminton player.

== Achievements ==
=== BWF International Challenge/Series ===
Mixed Doubles
Year	Tournament	Partner	Opponent	Score	Result
2012	Austrian International	(Switzerland) Sabrina Jaquet	(Hong Kong) Wong Wai Hong (Hong Kong) Chau Hoi Wah	6-21, 10=21	(silver) Runner-up
2011	Bahrain International	(Switzerland) Sabrina Jaquet	(Ukraine) Valeriy Atrashchenkov (Ukraine) Anna Kobceva	19-21, 21-15, 20-22	(silver) Runner-up

BWF International Challenge tournament
BWF International Series tournament
BWF Future Series tournament
