= Bolivia International =

Badminton tournament in Bolivia

The Bolivia International, officially named the Internacional de Badminton Bicentenario-Sucre Bolivia, is an open international badminton tournament held in Bolivia. Part of the BWF Future Series, the tournament is sanctioned by the Badminton World Federation and organized by the Bolivian Badminton Federation (Federación Boliviana de Bádminton) and Badminton Pan America.

The inaugural edition was held from 23 to 27 July 2025, at the Max Toledo Coliseum in Sucre. This marked the first BWF-sanctioned international tournament ever held in Bolivia. The event featured 44 athletes from 10 nations, including Guatemalan five-time Olympian Kevin Cordón and Mexican Pan American Championships medalist Sabrina Solís. A total of 18 players represented the host nation.

== Winners ==
Year	Men's singles	Women's singles	Men's doubles	Women's doubles	Mixed doubles	Ref
2025	(Guatemala) Kevin Cordón	(Mexico) Sabrina Solís	(Peru) Gonzalo Castillo (Peru) Sharum Durand	(Cuba) Leyanis Contreras (Cuba) Taymara Oropesa	(Peru) Sharum Durand (Peru) Namie Miyahira	
2026	(Malta) Matthew Abela	(Colombia) Juliana Giraldo	(Bolivia) Jorge Alejandro Paniagua Palma (Bolivia) Gabriel Danilo Rosales Medina	(Bolivia) Camila Lucero Mullisaca Quispe (Bolivia) Juanita Siviora	(Malta) Matthew Abela (Poland) Gabriela Skorkowska	

== Performances by nation ==
As of 2026 edition

Pos	Nation	MS	WS	MD	WD	XD	Total
1	Bolivia*	0	0	1	1	0	2
1	Peru	0	0	1	0	1	2
3	Malta	1	0	0	0	0.5	1.5
4	Colombia	0	1	0	0	0	1
4	Cuba	0	0	0	1	0	1
4	Guatemala	1	0	0	0	0	1
4	Mexico	0	1	0	0	0	1
8	Poland	0	0	0	0	0.5	0.5
Total		2	2	2	2	2	10

* Host nation
