= Sabrina Jaquet =

Swiss badminton player (born 1987)

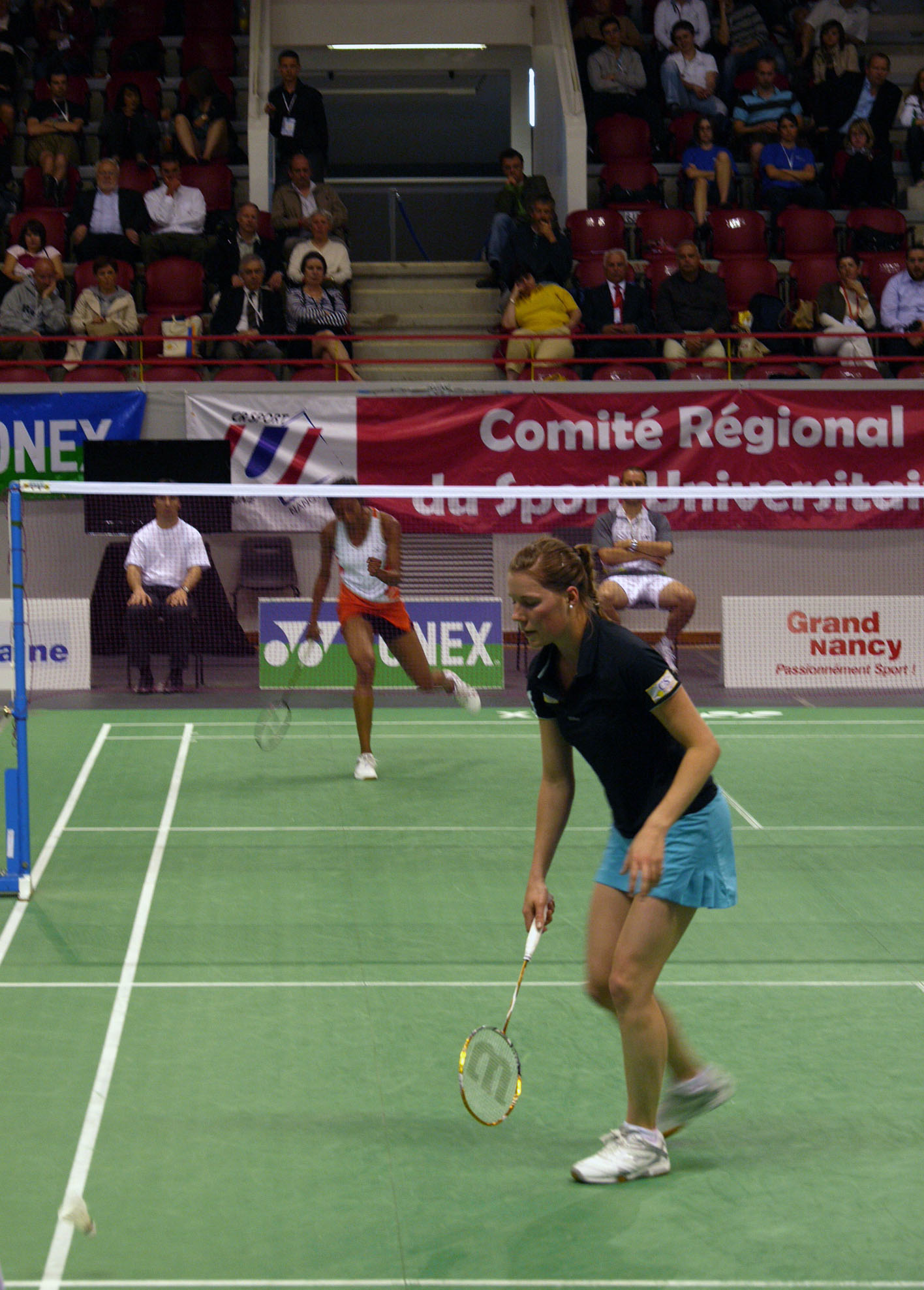

Personal information
- Born: 21 June 1987 (age 39) La Chaux-de-Fonds, Switzerland
- Height: 1.69 m (5 ft 7 in)
- Weight: 60 kg (132 lb)

Sport
- Country: Switzerland
- Sport: Badminton
- Handedness: Right
- Retired: 28 July 2021

Women's singles & doubles
- Career record: 361 wins, 382 losts
- Highest ranking: 30 (WS 14 September 2017); 55 (WD 30 September 2010); 37 (XD 18 October 2012)
- BWF profile
Medal record
Women's badminton
Representing Switzerland
European Championships
Bronze medal – third place	2017 Kolding	Women's singles

Sabrina Jaquet (born 21 June 1987) is a former Swiss badminton player. She won a bronze medal at the 2017 European Championships. Jaquet competed at the 2012, 2016 and 2020 Summer Olympics. Jaquet retired after the 2020 Olympics.

== Achievements ==
=== European Championships ===
Women's singles
Year	Venue	Opponent	Score	Result
2017	Sydbank Arena; Kolding, Denmark	(Scotland) Kirsty Gilmour	20–22, 10–21	Bronze

=== BWF Grand Prix (1 runner-up) ===
The BWF Grand Prix had two levels, the Grand Prix and Grand Prix Gold. It was a series of badminton tournaments sanctioned by the Badminton World Federation (BWF) and played between 2007 and 2017.

Women's singles
Year	Tournament	Opponent	Score	Result
2016	Scottish Open	(Denmark) Mette Poulsen	18–21, 21–17, 14–21	(silver) Runner-up

BWF Grand Prix Gold tournament
BWF Grand Prix tournament

=== BWF International Challenge/Series (3 titles, 7 runners-up) ===
Women's singles
Year	Tournament	Opponent	Score	Result
2011	Bahrain International	(Italy) Agnese Allegrini	21–14, 14–21, 17–21	(silver) Runner-up
2013	Italian International	(Spain) Carolina Marín	15–21, 14–21	(silver) Runner-up
2015	Sri Lanka International	(Thailand) Supanida Katethong	21–17, 11–21, 6–12 retired	(silver) Runner-up
2016	Swiss International	(Malaysia) Lee Ying Ying	16–21, 21–19, 21–15	(gold) Winner
2016	Italian International	(Spain) Clara Azurmendi	22–20, 21–14	(gold) Winner
2018	Brazil International	(Canada) Rachel Honderich	15–21, 21–15, 14–21	(silver) Runner-up
2020	Portugal International	(France) Léonice Huet	21–10, 21–11	(gold) Winner

Women's doubles
Year	Tournament	Partner	Opponent	Score	Result
2009	Czech International	(Switzerland) Marion Gruber	(Denmark) Maria Helsbøl (Denmark) Anne Skelbæk	14–21, 10–21	(silver) Runner-up

Mixed doubles
Year	Tournament	Partner	Opponent	Score	Result
2011	Bahrain International	(Switzerland) Anthony Dumartheray	(Ukraine) Valeriy Atrashchenkov (Ukraine) Anna Kobceva	19–21, 21–15, 20–22	(silver) Runner-up
2012	Austrian International	(Switzerland) Anthony Dumartheray	(Hong Kong) Wong Wai Hong (Hong Kong) Chau Hoi Wah	6–21, 10–21	(silver) Runner-up

BWF International Challenge tournament
BWF International Series tournament
BWF Future Series tournament
