= Matthew Abela =

Maltese badminton player and co-founder of Evolve Badminton Academy

Personal information
- Born: 18 March 1999 (age 27) Pietà, Malta
- Height: 1.71 m (5 ft 7 in)

Sport
- Country: Malta
- Sport: Badminton
- Handedness: Right

Men's singles & doubles
- Highest ranking: 149 (MS 5 February 2019)
- Current ranking: 195 (MS 8 June 2021)
- BWF profile
Medal record
Men's badminton
Representing Malta
Small States of Europe Championships
Bronze medal – third place	2023 Cospicua	Mixed team

Matthew Abela (born 18 March 1999) is a Maltese badminton player affiliated with Paola badminton club. He competed at the 2020 Summer Olympics in Men's singles.

== Career ==
Abela started playing badminton when he was 5 years old. His father, a Badminton coach, would bring him along to training sessions. He trained at the Paola badminton club, and entered the Maltese national team foe the first time in 2011. He won his first U19 national junior title in 2011, and by the end of 2019 had collected eleven U19 national junior titles. He made his international debut in the junior level tournaments in 2013, and to improve and with the intention to improve his game to become a better badminton player, he joined Badminton Europe's Centre of Excellence, based in Holbæk, Denmark, in September 2017.

By 2021, Abela had won six men's singles title and one mixed doubles title at the Maltese National Championships. He was selected to participate at the delayed 2020 Tokyo Olympics held in 2021, with partition granted through the IOC Tripartite Commission (invitation places). In doing so, Abela became the first badminton player to ever represent Malta at the Olympics.

He competed for Malta at the 2022 Commonwealth Games in Birmingham, England playing doubles alongside Sam Cassar.

Competing at the South Africa International in 2024, he won gold in the Men’s Doubles together with his doubles partner Maxim Grinblat, defeating Dorian James and Robert Summers in three sets in the final.

== Personal life ==
Abela is a fan of Liverpool F.C. and has stated his favourite ever player is Steven Gerrard.

== Achievements ==
=== BWF International Challenge/Series (3 titles, 3 runners-up) ===
Men's singles
Year	Tournament	Opponent	Score	Result
2026	Bolivia International	(Paraguay) Leo Lee	21–9, 15–21, 21–16	(gold) Winner

Men's doubles
Year	Tournament	Partner	Opponent	Score	Result
2023	Kampala International	(Israel) Maxim Grinblat	(Uganda) Brian Kasirye (Uganda) Muzafaru Lubega	15–21, 14–21	(silver) Runner-up
2023	Uganda International	(Israel) Maxim Grinblat	(Uganda) Brian Kasirye (Uganda) Muzafaru Lubega	Walkover	(silver) Runner-up
2024	Botswana International	(Israel) Maxim Grinblat	(Azerbaijan) Agil Gabilov (Azerbaijan) Dicky Dwi Pangestu	8–21, 15–21	(silver) Runner-up
2024	South Africa International	(Israel) Maxim Grinblat	(South Africa) Dorian James (South Africa) Robert Summers	10–21, 21–19, 22–20	(gold) Winner

Mixed doubles
Year	Tournament	Partner	Opponent	Score	Result
2026	Bolivia International	(Poland) Gabriela Skorkowska	(Bolivia) Gabriel Danilo Rosales Medina (Bolivia) Juanita Siviora	21–16, 21–18	(gold) Winner

BWF International Challenge tournament
BWF International Series tournament
BWF Future Series tournament
