= Maltese National Badminton Championships =

The Maltese National Badminton Championships is a tournament organized to crown the best badminton players in Malta. They are held since 1953.

== Past winners ==
Year	Men's singles	Women's singles	Men's doubles	Women's doubles	Mixed doubles
1953	J. Zammit-Lewis	no competition	H. J. Fiteni; V. Zammit	no competition	
1954	J. Zammit-Lewis	no competition	H. J. Fiteni; V. Zammit	no competition	no competition
1955	no competition			no competition	W. Watret; P. Stuckey
1956	A. Marland	no competition	H. J. Fiteni; V. Zammit	no competition	A. Marland; V. Keyes
1958	no competition				
1959	R. Harper	no competition	V. Zammit; L. Della	no competition	R. Harper; A. Harper
1960	no competition				
1961	J. C. Sillato	J. Wilkinson	A. Renfrew; F. McGruer	J. Wilkinson; L. Vassallo	J. Sillato; F. Ferne
1962	I. M. Miller	H. Thurlow	I. M. Miller; K. Galloway	B. Scrimgeour; O. Dawson	J. Sillato; M. Brand
1963	J. C. Sillato	B. Scoble	J. C. Sillato; Alfred Gales	M. Souter; J. Pearcey	Alfred Galea; P. Gaden
1964	R. Adams	M. Souter	Vincent Curmi; V. Zammit	M. Souter; W. Newton	R. Adams; E. Fielden
1965	Vincent Curmi	no competition	E. R. Adams; W. Watret	no competition	Kenneth Wain; J. Gowland
1966	Vincent Curmi	P. McGillivray	Alfred Cefai; Kenneth Wain	K. McGillivray; A. Jackson	A. Jackson; Jackson
1967	Kenneth Wain	Hazel Tough	Alfred Cefai; Kenneth Wain	Hazel Tough; Joan Pain	Kenneth Wain; L. Vassallo
1968; 1971	no competition				
1972	Vincent Curmi	Simone Vella	Vincent Curmi; Alfred Galea	C. Worley; Simone Vella	Kenneth Wain; L. Briscoe
1973	Vincent Curmi	Carmen Worley	Vincent Curmi; J. Zammit-Lewis	Doreen Cann; Doris Cordina	Alfred Cefain; Carmen Worley
1974	Vincent Curmi	no competition	Vincent Curmi; Alfred Galea	no competition	Kenneth Wain; Simone Vella
1975	Alfred Cefai	Doreen Cann	Alfred Cefai; Kenneth Wain	Doreen Cann; Doris Cordina	Alfred Cefai; Simone Vella
1976	Vincent Curmi	Joyce Abdilla	Alfred Cefai; Kenneth Wain	Joyce Abdilla; Simone Vella	Paul Vella; Joyce Abdilla
1977	Vincent Curmi	Joyce Abdilla	Alfred Cefai; Kenneth Wain	Joyce Abdilla; Doreen Cann	Paul Vella; Joyce Abdilla
1978	Paul Vella	Joyce Abdilla	Vincent Curmi; Paul Vella	Joyce Abdilla; Kitty Galea	Paul Vella; Joyce Abdilla
1979	Paul Vella	Joyce Abdilla	Vincent Curmi; Paul Vella	Joyce Abdilla; Marcelle Micallef	Kenneth Wain; Marcelle Micallef
1980	Godwin Grech	Joyce Abdilla	Godwin Grech; John Massa	Joyce Abdilla; Marcelle Micallef	Godwin Grech; Marcelle Micallef
1981	John Massa	Marcelle Micallef	Vincent Curmi; Kenneth Wain	Joyce Abdilla; Marcelle Micallef	Godwin Grech; Marcelle Micallef
1982	Godwin Grech	Joyce Abdilla	Godwin Grech; Martin Farrugia	Joyce Abdilla; Louise Manduca	Godwin Grech; Marcelle Micallef
1983	Godwin Grech	Joyce Abdilla	Godwin Grech; Martin Farrugia	Joyce Abdilla; Louise Manduca	Martin Farrugia; Joyce Abdilla
1984	Godwin Grech	Joyce Abdilla	Kenneth Wain; John Massa	Joyce Abdilla; Louise Manduca	Godwin Grech; Carmen Worley
1985	Martin Farrugia	Joyce Abdilla	Martin Farrugia; John Massa	Marcelle Micallef; Anna Galea	Martin Farrugia; Marcelle Micallef
1986	John Massa	Joyce Abdilla	Martin Farrugia; Anthony Xuereb	Marcelle Micallef; Anna Galea	Martin Farrugia; Marcelle Micallef
1987	Martin Farrugia	Joyce Abdilla	Martin Farrugia; Anthony Xuereb	Joyce Abdilla; Catherine Meli	Martin Farrugia; Anna Galea
1988	Kenneth Vella	Joyce Abdilla	Martin Farrugia; Anthony Xuereb	Catherine Meli; Marcelle Chircop	Kenneth Vella; Catherine Meli
1989	Kenneth Vella	Joyce Abdilla	Martin Farrugia; Anthony Xuereb	Catherine Meli; Marcelle Chircop	Kenneth Vella; Catherine Meli
1990	Simon Spiteri	Catherine Dimech	Simon Spiteri; Kenneth Vella	Catherine Dimech; Marcelle Chircop	Kenneth Vella; Catherine Dimech
1991	Kenneth Vella	Shirley Cefai	Simon Spiteri; Kenneth Vella	Catherine Dimech; Shirley Cefai	Kenneth Vella; Catherine Dimech
1992	Kenneth Vella	Joanne Grech	Aldo Polidano; Kenneth Vella	Catherine Dimech; Suzanne Privitelli	Kenneth Vella; Louise Bailey
1993	Kenneth Vella	Joanne Grech	Simon Spiteri; David Cole	Catherine Dimech; Joanne Grech	Kenneth Vella; Catherine Dimech
1994	Simon Spiteri	Joanne Grech	Simon Spiteri; David Cole	Catherine Dimech; Joanne Grech	Kenneth Vella; Catherine Dimech
1995	Kenneth Vella	Joanne Grech	Kenneth Vella; Aldo Polidano	Catherine Dimech; Joanne Grech	Kenneth Vella; Catherine Dimech
1996	Kenneth Vella	Joanne Grech	Kenneth Vella; Aldo Polidano	Catherine Dimech; Joanne Grech	Kenneth Vella; Catherine Dimech
1997	Kenneth Vella	Joanne Grech	Kenneth Vella; Aldo Polidano	Catherine Dimech; Joanne Grech	Kenneth Vella; Catherine Dimech
1998	Simon Spiteri	Jennifer Borg	Simon Spiteri; David Cole	Catherine Dimech; Joanne Grech	Kenneth Vella; Catherine Dimech
1999	Kenneth Vella	Joanne Grech	Kenneth Vella; Aldo Polidano	Catherine Dimech; Joanne Grech	Aldo Polidano; Joanne Grech
2000	Kenneth Vella	Joanne Cassar	Kenneth Vella; Aldo Polidano	Catherine Dimech; Joanne Cassar	Aldo Polidano; Joanne Cassar
2001	Kenneth Vella	Jennifer Borg	Kenneth Vella; Rodney Abela	Jennifer Borg; Jacqueline De Giovanni	David Cole; Jennifer Borg
2002	Kenneth Vella	Jacqueline De Giovanni	David Cole; Edmond Abela	Catherine Dimech; Joanne Cassar	Catherine Dimech; Kenneth Vella
2003	Stefan Salomone	Jacqueline De Giovanni	Robert Salomone; Stefan Salomone	Catherine Dimech; Joanne Cassar	Catherine Dimech; Kenneth Vella
2004	Aldo Polidano	Jacqueline De Giovanni	Robert Salomone; Stefan Salomone	Catherine Dimech; Joanne Cassar	Jacqueline De Giovanni; Stefan Salomone
2005	Stefan Salomone	Jacqueline De Giovanni	Robert Salomone; Stefan Salomone	Catherine Dimech; Joanne Cassar	Jacqueline De Giovanni; Stefan Salomone
2006	Kenneth Vella	Joanne Cassar	Kenneth Vella; Anthony Xuereb	Catherine Dimech; Joanne Cassar	Joanne Cassar; David Cole
2007	Stefan Salomone	Joanne Cassar	Stefan Salomone; Robert Salomone	Catherine Dimech; Joanne Cassar	Kenneth Vella; Catherine Dimech
2008	Stefan Salomone	Maria Borg	Stefan Salomone; Robert Salomone	Catherine Dimech; Joanne Cassar	Stefan Salomone; Fiorella Farrugia
2009	Kenneth Vella	Joanne Cassar	Stefan Salomone; Robert Salomone	Catherine Dimech; Joanne Cassar	Stefan Salomone; Fiorella Farrugia
2010	Stefan Salomone	Maria Borg	Stefan Salomone; Robert Salomone	Maria Borg; Fiorella Farrugia	Stefan Salomone; Fiorella Farrugia
2011	Stefan Salomone	Maria Borg	Stefan Salomone; Aldo Polidano	Maria Borg; Fiorella Farrugia	Stefan Salomone; Fiorella Farrugia
2012	David Cole	Fiorella Sadowski	Stefan Salomone; Aldo Polidano	Catriona Francica; Dominique Francica	Stefan Salomone; Fiorella Sadowski
2013	Samuel Calì	Fiorella Sadowski	Samuel Calì; Stephen Ferrante	Jacqueline Grech Licari; Joanne Cassar	Stephen Ferrante; Fiorella Sadowski
2014	Stefan Salomone	Fiorella Sadowski	Stefan Salomone; Aldo Polidano	Marica Micallef; Fiorella Sadowski	Stephen Ferrante; Fiorella Sadowski
2015	Stefan Salomone	Fiorella Sadowski	Samuel Calì; Stefan Salomone	Yanika Polidano; Fiorella Sadowski	Stephen Ferrante; Fiorella Sadowski
2016	Matthew Abela	Fiorella Sadowski	Nigel Degaetano; Stephen Ferrante	Sarah Fava; Dominique Francica	Stefan Salomone; Klara O'Berg
2017	Matthew Abela	Fiorella Sadowski	Samuel Cali` Stefan Salomone	Fiorella Sadowski; Yanika Polidano	Stefan Salomone; Klara O'Berg
2018	Matthew Abela	Fiorella Sadowski	Samuel Cali` Stefan Salomone	Fiorella Sadowski; Yanika Polidano	Stephen Ferrante; Fiorella Sadowski
2019	Matthew Abela	Fiorella Sadowski	Samuel Cassar; Mark Abela	Fiorella Sadowski; Yanika Polidano	Samuel Cassar; Francesca Clark
2020	Matthew Abela	Fiorella Sadowski	Samuel Cassar; Mark Abela	Francesca Clark; Sarah Fava	Matthew Abela; Sarah Fava
2021	Matthew Abela	Francesca Clark	Samuel Cassar; Mark Abela	Francesca Clark; Sarah Fava	Samuel Cassar; Francesca Clark
2022	Matthew Abela	Francesca Clark	Samuel Cassar; Mark Abela	Francesca Clark; Michaela Ellul	Samuel Cassar; Francesca Clark
2023	Matthew Abela	Francesca Clark	Matthew Abela; Matthew Galea	Francesca Clark; Michaela Ellul	Samuel Cassar; Francesca Clark
2024	Samuel Cassar	Francesca Clark	Samuel Cassar; Mark Abela	Lauren Azzopardi; Elenia Haber	Samuel Cassar; Francesca Clark
2025	Matthew Abela	Francesca Clark	Matthew Abela; Matthew Galea	Lauren Azzopardi; Elenia Haber	Samuel Cassar; Francesca Clark
2026	Matthew Abela	Francesca Clark	Samuel Cassar; Mark Abela	Lauren Azzopardi; Elenia Haber	Samuel Cassar; Francesca Clark
