= 1969 Uber Cup knockout stage =

Badminton tournament

The knockout stage for the 1969 Uber Cup began on 8 June 1969 with the first round and ended on 14 June with the final tie.

== Qualified teams ==
The teams that won their zonal tie qualified for the final knockout stage.

Group	Winners
A	Japan
B	Thailand
C	United States
D	England
E	Indonesia

== Bracket ==
First round
Japan
Bye
8 June 1969 – Tokyo
England	7
Thailand	0
8 June 1969 – Tokyo
Indonesia	7
United States	0

Second round
Japan
Bye
11 June 1969 – Tokyo
England	3
Indonesia	4

Challenge round
14 June 1966 – Tokyo
Japan	6
Indonesia	1

== First round ==
=== United States vs Indonesia ===
United States
0
Tokyo Metropolitan Gymnasium
8 June 1969

Indonesia
7

			1	2	3
1	(United States) (Indonesia)	Dorothy O'Neil; Utami Dewi	4; 11	7; 11
2	(United States) (Indonesia)	Tyna Barinaga; Minarni	3; 11	7; 11
3	(United States) (Indonesia)	Cindy Root; Nurhaena	11; 12	4; 11
4	(United States) (Indonesia)	Lois Alston / Carlene Starkey; Hesty Lianawati / Minarni	3; 5	0; 8
5	(United States) (Indonesia)	Tyna Barinaga / Rosine Lemon; Nurhaena / Poppy Tumengkol	8; 15	7; 15
6	(United States) (Indonesia)	Tyna Barinaga / Rosine Lemon; Hesty Lianawati / Minarni	3; 15	10; 15
7	(United States) (Indonesia)	Lois Alston / Carlene Starkey; Nurhaena / Poppy Tumengkol	15; 12	12; 15	4; 15

=== England vs Thailand ===
England
7
Tokyo Metropolitan Gymnasium
8 June 1969

Thailand
0

			1	2	3
1	(England) (Thailand)	Gillian Perrin; Thongkam Kingmanee	11; 6	11; 2
2	(England) (Thailand)	Heather Nielsen; Boopha Kaenthong	10; 12	11; 8	11; 6
3	(England) (Thailand)	Margaret Boxall; Sumol Chanklum	11; 3	11; 8
4	(England) (Thailand)	Margaret Boxall / Susan Whetnall; Boopha Kaenthong / Thongkam Kingmanee	15; 3	15; 5
5	(England) (Thailand)	Gillian Perrin / Julie Rickard; Sumol Chanklum / Pachara Pattabongse	15; 11	10; 15	15; 7
6	(England) (Thailand)	Gillian Perrin / Julie Rickard; Boopha Kaenthong / Thongkam Kingmanee	15; 8	15; 9
7	(England) (Thailand)	Margaret Boxall / Susan Whetnall; Sumol Chanklum / Pachara Pattabongse	15; 3	15; 5

== Second round ==
=== England vs Indonesia ===
England
3
Tokyo Metropolitan Gymnasium
11 June 1969

Indonesia
4

			1	2	3
1	(England) (Indonesia)	Heather Nielsen; Utami Dewi	4; 11	10; 12
2	(England) (Indonesia)	Gillian Perrin; Minarni	9; 12	2; 11
3	(England) (Indonesia)	Margaret Boxall; Nurhaena	11; 5	11; 3
4	(England) (Indonesia)	Margaret Boxall / Susan Whetnall; Hesty Lianawati / Nurhaena	15; 10	18; 17
5	(England) (Indonesia)	Gillian Perrin / Julie Rickard; Retno Kustijah / Minarni	3; 15	11; 15
6	(England) (Indonesia)	Gillian Perrin / Julie Rickard; Hesty Lianawati / Nurhaena	3; 15	0; 15
7	(England) (Indonesia)	Margaret Boxall / Susan Whetnall; Retno Kustijah / Minarni	17; 18	15; 7		retired

== Challenge round ==
Japan won its second consecutive Uber Cup final, having won the tournament in 1966. The Indonesian women won just one of seven matches. That winner was Minarni who beat the reigning All England champion Hiroe Yuki.

=== Japan vs Indonesia ===
Japan
6
Tokyo Metropolitan Gymnasium
14 June 1969

Indonesia
1

			1	2	3
1	(Japan) (Indonesia)	Noriko Takagi; Poppy Tumengkol	11; 0	11; 0
2	(Japan) (Indonesia)	Hiroe Yuki; Minarni	6; 11	2; 11
3	(Japan) (Indonesia)	Tomoko Takahashi; Utami Dewi	11; 3	11; 8
4	(Japan) (Indonesia)	Noriko Takagi / Hiroe Yuki; Retno Kustijah / Minarni	8; 15	15; 5	15; 12
5	(Japan) (Indonesia)	Noriko Takagi / Hiroe Yuki; Hesty Lianawati / Nurhaena	15; 3	15; 3
6	(Japan) (Indonesia)	Hiroe Amano / Tomoko Takahashi; Hesty Lianawati / Nurhaena	15; 4	15; 5
7	(Japan) (Indonesia)	Hiroe Amano / Tomoko Takahashi; Retno Kustijah / Minarni	15; 8	15; 8
