= 1966 Uber Cup qualification =

Tournament details
- Dates: 19 June 1965 – 21 March 1966
- Location: Asian zone: Hyderabad European zone: Abingdon; Belfast; Carlisle; Haarlem; Solingen Australasian zone: Auckland; Launceston

The qualifying process for the 1966 Uber Cup took place from 19 June 1965 to 21 March 1966 to decide the final teams which will play in the final tournament.

== Qualification process ==
The qualification process is divided into four regions, the Asian Zone, the American Zone, the European Zone and the Australasian Zone. Teams in their respective zone will compete in a knockout format. Three singles and four doubles will be played on the day of competition. The teams that win their respective zone will earn a place in the final tournament to be held in New Zealand.

The winners of the 1963 Uber Cup, the United States were exempted from the qualifying rounds and automatically qualified for the challenge round. Therefore, Canada automatically qualified for the final tournament since there was no other opponent in the American zone qualifiers.

=== Qualified teams ===
Country	Qualified as	Qualified on	Final appearance
United States	1963 Uber Cup winners	6 April 1963	4th
Japan	Asian Zone winners	27 February 1966	1st
England	European Zone winners	21 March 1966	2nd
Canada	Sole representative of the American Zone	March 1965	3rd
Indonesia	Australasian Zone winners	26 June 1965	2nd

== Asian Zone ==
=== Bracket ===
First round
February 1966 – Hyderabad
India	w/o
Malaysia
Thailand
Bye
Hong Kong
Bye
Japan
Bye

Semi-finals
20 February 1966 – Hyderabad
India	4
Thailand	3
February 1966 – Hyderabad
Hong Kong
Japan	w/o

Final
27 February 1966 – Hyderabad
Thailand	0
Japan	7

=== First round ===
India were automatically given a place in the semi-finals after Malaysia withdrew its team from the competition.

=== Semi-finals ===
Thailand
4
Hyderabad, India
20 February 1966

India
3

			1	2	3
1	(Thailand) (India)	Boopha Kaenthong; Meena Shah	7; 11	11; 9	6; 0	retired
2	(Thailand) (India)	Sumol Chanklum; Sarojini Apte	7; 11	9; 11
3	(Thailand) (India)	Pratuang Pattabongse; Shobha Moorthy	9; 12	11; 12
4	(Thailand) (India)	Sumol Chanklum / Boopha Kaenthong; Sarojini Apte / Sunila Apte	15; 9	15; 12
5	(Thailand) (India)	Pachara Pattabongse / Pratuang Pattabongse; Achala Karnik / Shobha Moorthy	14; 17	15; 12	11; 15
6	(Thailand) (India)	Pachara Pattabongse / Pratuang Pattabongse; Sarojini Apte / Sunila Apte	15; 7	15; 9
7	(Thailand) (India)	Sumol Chanklum / Boopha Kaenthong; Achala Karnik / Shobha Moorthy	9; 15	18; 13	15; 7

=== Final ===
Thailand
0
Hyderabad, India
27 February 1966

Japan
7

			1	2	3
1	(Thailand) (Japan)	Sumol Chanklum; Mitsuko Yokoyama	10; 12	6; 11
2	(Thailand) (Japan)	Boopha Kaenthong; Fumiko Yokoi	0; 11	0; 11
3	(Thailand) (Japan)	Thongkham Kingmanee; Noriko Takagi	2; 11	2; 11
4	(Thailand) (Japan)	Sumol Chanklum / Boopha Kaenthong; Kazuko Gotō / Noriko Takagi	7; 15	8; 15
5	(Thailand) (Japan)	Pachara Pattabongse / Pratuang Pattabongse; Hiroe Amano / Tomoko Takahashi	13; 18	15; 9	3; 15
6	(Thailand) (Japan)	Pachara Pattabongse / Pratuang Pattabongse; Kazuko Gotō / Noriko Takagi				w/o
7	(Thailand) (Japan)	Sumol Chanklum / Boopha Kaenthong; Hiroe Amano / Tomoko Takahashi				w/o

== European Zone ==
=== Bracket ===
First round
30 November 1965 – Belfast
Ireland	4
Scotland	3
29 December 1966 – Haarlem
Netherlands	1
England	6
Denmark
South Africa	w/o
West Germany
Bye

Semi-finals
4 February 1966 – Carlisle
Ireland	0
England	7
12 February 1966 – Solingen
South Africa	0
West Germany	7

Final
21 March 1966 – Abingdon
England	7
West Germany	0

=== First round ===
Ireland
4
Belfast, Northern Ireland
30 November 1965

Scotland
3

			1	2	3
1	(Republic of Ireland) (Scotland)	Mary Bryan; Muriel Ferguson	9; 11	11; 5	4; 11
2	(Republic of Ireland) (Scotland)	Yvonne Kelly; Wilma Reid	11; 6	11; 4
3	(Republic of Ireland) (Scotland)	Maureen Perry; Mary Thompson	11; 8	9; 11	11; 4
4	(Republic of Ireland) (Scotland)	Lena McAleese / Susan Peard; Muriel Ferguson / Mary Thompson	11; 15	15; 11	8; 15
5	(Republic of Ireland) (Scotland)	Yvonne Kelly / Mary Bryan; Catherine Dunglison / Wilma Reid	8; 15	15; 4	15; 10
6	(Republic of Ireland) (Scotland)	Lena McAleese / Susan Peard; Catherine Dunglison / Wilma Reid	15; 12	10; 13		retired
7	(Republic of Ireland) (Scotland)	Yvonne Kelly / Mary Bryan; Muriel Ferguson / Mary Thompson				w/o

England
6
Haarlem, Netherlands
29 December 1965

Netherlands
1

			1	2	3
1	(England) (Netherlands)	Angela Bairstow; Imre Rietveld	7; 11	3; 11
2	(England) (Netherlands)	Jenny Horton; Agnes Geene	8; 11	11; 8	11; 7
3	(England) (Netherlands)	Sheila Ryder; Felice de Nooyer	11; 7	7; 11	11; 8
4	(England) (Netherlands)	Jenny Horton / Iris Rogers; Felice de Nooyer / Marja Ridder	15; 9	15; 8
5	(England) (Netherlands)	Angela Bairstow / Margaret Barrand; Agnes Geene / Imre Rietveld	7; 15	17; 15	15; 8
6	(England) (Netherlands)	Angela Bairstow / Margaret Barrand; Felice de Nooyer / Marja Ridder	15; 5	15; 9
7	(England) (Netherlands)	Jenny Horton / Iris Rogers; Agnes Geene / Imre Rietveld	15; 8	15; 11

=== Semi-finals ===
England
7
Carlisle, England
4 February 1966

Ireland
0

			1	2	3
1	(England) (Republic of Ireland)	Angela Bairstow; Mary Bryan	11; 5	11; 5
2	(England) (Republic of Ireland)	Jenny Horton; Yvonne Kelly	11; 7	11; 1
3	(England) (Republic of Ireland)	Sheila Ryder; V. Marshall	11; 5	11; 7
4	(England) (Republic of Ireland)	Angela Bairstow / Margaret Barrand; Yvonne Kelly / Mary Bryan	9; 15	18; 13	15; 9
5	(England) (Republic of Ireland)	Jenny Horton / Iris Rogers; Yvonne Kelly / Mary Bryan	17; 16	15; 6
6	(England) (Republic of Ireland)	Jenny Horton / Iris Rogers; Susan Peard / Maureen Perry	15; 5	15; 6
7	(England) (Republic of Ireland)	Angela Bairstow / Margaret Barrand; Susan Peard / Maureen Perry	15; 2	15; 9

West Germany
7
Solingen, West Germany
12 February 1966

South Africa
0

			1	2	3
1	(West Germany) (South Africa)	Irmgard Latz; Wilma Prade	11; 3	11; 4
2	(West Germany) (South Africa)	Marieluise Wackerow; Ann Smith	11; 6	11; 1
3	(West Germany) (South Africa)	Gerda Schumacher; Kay Stavridis	6; 11	11; 4	11; 4
4	(West Germany) (South Africa)	Irmgard Latz / Gerda Schumacher; Melanie Harris / Kay Stavridis	15; 5	15; 2
5	(West Germany) (South Africa)	Heidi Menacher / Marieluise Wackerow; Wilma Prade / Ann Smith	15; 1	15; 5
6	(West Germany) (South Africa)	Heidi Menacher / Marieluise Wackerow; Melanie Harris / Kay Stavridis	15; 12	17; 18	18; 15
7	(West Germany) (South Africa)	Irmgard Latz / Gerda Schumacher; Wilma Prade / Ann Smith	15; 2	15; 6

=== Final ===
England
7
Abingdon-on-Thames, England
21 March 1966

West Germany
0

			1	2	3
1	(England) (West Germany)	Angela Bairstow; Irmgard Latz	11; 6	5; 11	12; 9
2	(England) (West Germany)	Heather Nielsen; Marieluise Wackerow	11; 0	11; 7
3	(England) (West Germany)	Ursula Smith; Gerda Schumacher	11; 5	11; 6
4	(England) (West Germany)	Angela Bairstow / Heather Nielsen; Heidi Menacher / Marieluise Wackerow	15; 12	15; 7
5	(England) (West Germany)	Margaret Barrand / Jenny Horton; Irmgard Latz / Gerda Schumacher	15; 6	15; 5
6	(England) (West Germany)	Margaret Barrand / Jenny Horton; Heidi Menacher / Marieluise Wackerow	17; 16	15; 7
7	(England) (West Germany)	Angela Bairstow / Heather Nielsen; Irmgard Latz / Gerda Schumacher	13; 15	15; 1	15; 8

== Australasian Zone ==
=== Bracket ===
Semi-finals
19 June 1965 – Auckland
Indonesia	7
New Zealand	0
Bye
Australia

Final
26 June 1965 – Launceston
Indonesia	6
Australia	1

=== Semi-finals ===
Indonesia
7
Auckland, New Zealand
19 June 1965

New Zealand
0

			1	2	3
1	(Indonesia) (New Zealand)	Minarni; Heather Robson	11; 5	11; 3
2	(Indonesia) (New Zealand)	Happy Herowati; Val Gow	10; 12	11; 8	11; 5
3	(Indonesia) (New Zealand)	Corry Kawilarang; Gilda Tompkins	11; 1	11; 7
4	(Indonesia) (New Zealand)	Retno Koestijah / Minarni; Val Gow / Heather Robson	15; 4	15; 3
5	(Indonesia) (New Zealand)	Megah Idawati / Corry Kawilarang; Margaret Bush / Gilda Tompkins	15; 6	15; 10
6	(Indonesia) (New Zealand)	Megah Idawati / Corry Kawilarang; Val Gow / Heather Robson	18; 15	15; 6
7	(Indonesia) (New Zealand)	Retno Koestijah / Minarni; Margaret Bush / Gilda Tompkins	15; 3	15; 4

=== Final ===
Indonesia
6
Launceston, Australia
26 June 1965

Australia
1

			1	2	3
1	(Indonesia) (Australia)	Minarni; Kay Nesbit	11; 2	11; 0
2	(Indonesia) (Australia)	Corry Kawilarang; Joy Twining	2; 11	11; 6	5; 11
3	(Indonesia) (Australia)	Happy Herowati; Dulcie King	11; 9	12; 10
4	(Indonesia) (Australia)	Retno Koestijah / Minarni; Judy Smith / Joy Twining	15; 2	15; 10
5	(Indonesia) (Australia)	Megah Idawati / Corry Kawilarang; Cynthia Archer / Dulcie King	15; 3	15; 3
6	(Indonesia) (Australia)	Megah Idawati / Corry Kawilarang; Judy Smith / Joy Twining	15; 9	15; 5
7	(Indonesia) (Australia)	Retno Koestijah / Minarni; Cynthia Archer / Dulcie King	15; 0	15; 1
