= Monaco national badminton team =

National badminton team representing Monaco

Monaco
- Association: Fédération Monégasque de Badminton (FMBAD)
- Confederation: BE (Europe)
- President: Sylvie Bertrand

BWF ranking
- Current ranking: Unranked (2 January 2024)
- Highest ranking: Unranked

The Monaco national badminton team (French: L'équipe nationale de badminton de Monaco; Monégasque: Squadra naçionâ de badminton de Mùnegu) represents Monaco in international badminton team competitions. Monaco made their first international team tournament debut at the 2024 Small States of Europe Badminton Championships.

== History ==
The national team was formed in 2010 after the establishment of Federation Monegasque de Badminton (FMBAD). The Monegasque team became a member of Badminton Europe in 2013 and the Badminton World Federation in 2014.

=== Mixed team ===
In 2018, the Monegasque team was scheduled to compete in the inaugural edition of the European Small States Badminton Games in 2020. The games were organized by eight national teams from Badminton Europe. However, the team did not compete after the tournament was scrapped after coinciding with COVID-19 restrictions during the COVID-19 pandemic in 2020.

The team first competed in the 2024 Small States of Europe Badminton Championships in Nicosia. The team was eliminated in the group stages and finished in ninth place on the overall rankings.

== Competitive record ==
The following tables show the Monaco national badminton team's competitive record in international tournaments.

Key

CH	RU	3rd	SF	4th	QF	#R	GS	Q#	#th	A	NH	WDN	DNQ

(CH) champion; (RU) runners-up; (3rd) third place; (SF) semi-finalists; (4th) fourth place; (QF) quarter-finalist; (#R) rounds 4, 3, 2, 1; (#th) places 5, 6...; (GS) group stage; (Q#) qualification round; (A) absent; (NH) not held; (WDN) withdrawn; (DNQ) did not qualify.

=== Thomas Cup ===
Year	1949	1952	1955	1958	1961	1964	1967	1970	1973	1976
Result	A									
Year	1979	1982	1984	1986	1988	1990	1992	1994	1996	1998
Result	A									
Year	2000	2002	2004	2006	2008	2010	2012	2014	2016	2018
Result	A									
Year	2020	2022	2024	2026	2028	2030	2032	2034	2036	2038
Result	A			TBD						

=== Uber Cup ===
Year	1950–1953			1957	1960	1963	1966	1969	1972	1975
Result	NH			A						
Year	1978	1981	1984	1986	1988	1990	1992	1994	1996	1998
Result	A									
Year	2000	2002	2004	2006	2008	2010	2012	2014	2016	2018
Result	A									
Year	2020	2022	2024	2026	2028	2030	2032	2034	2036	2038
Result	A			TBD						

=== Sudirman Cup ===
Year	1989	1991	1993	1995	1997	1999	2001	2003	2005	2007
Result	A									
Year	2009	2011	2013	2015	2017	2019	2021	2023	2025	2027
Result	A									TBD

=== European Team Championships ===
==== Men's team ====
Year	2006	2008	2010	2012	2014	2016	2018	2020	2024	2026
Result	A									TBD
Year	2028	2030	2032	2034	2036	2038	2040	2042	2044	2046
Result	TBD									

==== Women's team ====
Year	2006	2008	2010	2012	2014	2016	2018	2020	2024	2026
Result	A									TBD
Year	2028	2030	2032	2034	2036	2038	2040	2042	2044	2046
Result	TBD									

==== Mixed team ====
Year	1972	1974	1976	1978	1980	1982	1984	1986	1988	1990
Result	A									
Year	1992	1994	1996	1998	2000	2002	2004	2006	2008	2009
Result	A									
Year	2011	2013	2015	2017	2019	2021	2023	2025	2027	2029
Result	A								TBD	

=== Small States of Europe Team Championships ===
==== Mixed team ====
Year	2023	2024	2025
Result	A	GS	TBD

**Red border color indicates tournament was held on home soil.

== Junior competitive record ==
=== Suhandinata Cup ===
Year	2000	2002	2004	2006	2007	2008	2009	2010	2011	2012
Result	A									
Year	2013	2014	2015	2016	2017	2018	2019	2022	2023	2024
Result	A									

=== European Junior Team Championships ===
==== Mixed team ====
Year	1975	1977	1979	1981	1983	1985	1987	1989	1991	1993
Result	A									
Year	1995	1997	1999	2001	2003	2005	2007	2009	2011	2013
Result	A									
Year	2015	2017	2018	2020	2022	2024	2026	2028	2029	2030
Result	A						TBD			

**Red border color indicates tournament was held on home soil.

== Players ==
=== Current squad ===
As of 23 July 2026

==== Men's team ====
Name	DoB/Age	World BWF Ranking		
Name	DoB/Age	MS	MD	XD
Alexandre Rampelberg	23	-	-	-
Antony Ganachau	33	-	-	-
Lilian Tessier	16	-	-	-
Clément Facquet	24	-	-	-

==== Women's team ====
Name	DoB/Age	World BWF Ranking		
Name	DoB/Age	WS	WD	XD
Mélanie Potin	27	1112	1089	-
Thien Tran	37	-	-	-
Elisa Ganachau	22	-	-	-
