= 1969 Uber Cup qualification =

Tournament details
- Dates: 7 September 1968 – 28 February 1969
- Location: Asian zone: Bangkok American zone: Wilmington; European zone: Copenhagen; Dresden; Dublin; Dunfermline; Edinburgh; Hamburg; Stoke Australasian zone: Masterton; Perth

The qualifying process for the 1969 Uber Cup took place from 7 September 1968 to 28 February 1969 to decide the final teams which will play in the final tournament.

== Qualification process ==
The qualification process is divided into four regions, the Asian Zone, the American Zone, the European Zone and the Australasian Zone. Teams in their respective zone will compete in a knockout format. Three singles and four doubles will be played on the day of competition. The teams that win their respective zone will earn a place in the final tournament to be held in Tokyo.

The winners of the 1966 Uber Cup, Japan were exempted from the qualifying rounds and automatically qualified for the challenge round.

=== Qualified teams ===
Country	Qualified as	Qualified on	Final appearance
Japan	1966 Uber Cup winners	21 May 1966	2nd
Thailand	Asian Zone winners	1 February 1969	1st
England	European Zone winners	28 February 1969	3rd
United States	American Zone winners	3 March 1969	5th
Indonesia	Australasian Zone winners	21 September 1968	3rd

== Asian Zone ==
=== Bracket ===
Semi-finals
30 January 1969 – Bangkok
Thailand	5
India	2
Bye
South Korea

Final
1 February 1969 – Bangkok
Thailand	5
South Korea	2

=== Semi-finals ===
Thailand
5
Bangkok, Thailand
30 January 1969

India
2

			1	2	3
1	(Thailand) (India)	Thongkam Kingmanee; Damayanti Tambay
2	(Thailand) (India)	Kanitta Mansamuth; Shobha Moorthy
3	(Thailand) (India)	Sumol Chanklum; Rafia Latif
4	(Thailand) (India)	Thongkam Kingmanee / Kanitta Mansamuth; Joe Phillips / Damayanti Tambay
5	(Thailand) (India)	Sumol Chanklum / Pachara Pattabongse; Morin Mathias / Shobha Moorthy
6	(Thailand) (India)	Sumol Chanklum / Pachara Pattabongse; Joe Phillips / Damayanti Tambay
7	(Thailand) (India)	Thongkam Kingmanee / Kanitta Mansamuth; Morin Mathias / Shobha Moorthy

=== Final ===
Thailand
5
Bangkok, Thailand
1 February 1969

South Korea
2

			1	2	3
1	(Thailand) (South Korea)	Thongkam Kingmanee; Lee Young-soon	11; 6	11; 7
2	(Thailand) (South Korea)	Kanitta Mansamuth; Kang Young-sin	11; 4	11; 5
3	(Thailand) (South Korea)	Sumol Chanklum; Mae Ho-yong	11; 0	11; 8
4	(Thailand) (South Korea)	Thongkam Kingmanee / Kanitta Mansamuth; Kang Young-sin / Lee Young-soon	15; 2	15; 7
5	(Thailand) (South Korea)	Sumol Chanklum / Pachara Pattabongse; Han Sook-ee / Mae Ho-yong	15; 0	15; 6
6	(Thailand) (South Korea)	Sumol Chanklum / Pachara Pattabongse; Kang Young-sin / Lee Young-soon				w/o
7	(Thailand) (South Korea)	Thongkam Kingmanee / Kanitta Mansamuth; Han Sook-ee / Mae Ho-yong				w/o

== American Zone ==
=== Bracket ===
Semi-finals
3 March 1969 – Wilmington
United States	5
Canada	2
Bye
Peru

Final
March 1969 – Lima
United States	w/o
Peru

=== Semi-finals ===
United States
5
Wilmington, United States
23 January 1969

Canada
2

			1	2	3
1	(United States) (Canada)	Judy Hashman; Alison Daysmith	8; 11	11; 2	11; 7
2	(United States) (Canada)	Tyna Barinaga; Sharon Whittaker	7; 11	12; 10	11; 6
3	(United States) (Canada)	Cindy Root; Judy Rollick	5; 11	11; 12
4	(United States) (Canada)	Judy Hashman / Rosine Lemon; Barbara Hood / Marjory Shedd	15; 7	18; 16
5	(United States) (Canada)	Tyna Barinaga / Carlene Starkey; Mimi Nilsson / Judy Rollick	15; 8	15; 5
6	(United States) (Canada)	Tyna Barinaga / Carlene Starkey; Barbara Hood / Marjory Shedd	15; 7	15; 7
7	(United States) (Canada)	Judy Hashman / Rosine Lemon; Mimi Nilsson / Judy Rollick				w/o

=== Final ===
The United States automatically qualified for the final tournament as winners of the Pan American zone after Peru withdrew from the competition.

== European Zone ==
=== Bracket ===
First round
England
Bye
Bye
Bye
21 November 1968 – Dublin
Ireland	2
Denmark	5
South Africa
Bye
December 1968 – Haarlem
Netherlands
East Germany	w/o
5 December 1968 – Dunfermline
Scotland	4
Sweden	3
Bye
Bye
Bye
West Germany

Second round
England
Bye
2 January 1969 – Copenhagen
Denmark	7
South Africa	0
25 January 1969 – Dresden
East Germany	1
Scotland	6
Bye
West Germany

Semi-finals
23 January 1969 – Stoke
England	5
Denmark	2
16 February 1969 – Edinburgh
Scotland	1
West Germany	6

Final
28 February 1969 – Hamburg
England	6
West Germany	1

=== First round ===
Ireland
2
Dublin, Ireland
21 November 1968

Denmark
5

			1	2	3
1	(Republic of Ireland) (Denmark)	Mary Bryan; Jette Føge	12; 11	11; 8
2	(Republic of Ireland) (Denmark)	Yvonne Kelly; Anne Flindt	8; 11	2; 11
3	(Republic of Ireland) (Denmark)	Dorothy Haslam; Lizbeth von Barnekow	5; 11	3; 11
4	(Republic of Ireland) (Denmark)	Yvonne Kelly / Mary Bryan; Anne Flindt / Pernille Mølgaard Hansen	4; 15	15; 13	15; 3
5	(Republic of Ireland) (Denmark)	Lena McAleese / Maureen Mockford; Karin Jørgensen / Ulla Strand	2; 15	5; 15
6	(Republic of Ireland) (Denmark)	Lena McAleese / Maureen Mockford; Anne Flindt / Pernille Mølgaard Hansen	3; 15	2; 15
7	(Republic of Ireland) (Denmark)	Yvonne Kelly / Mary Bryan; Karin Jørgensen / Ulla Strand	15; 12	14; 17	12; 15

Scotland
4
Dunfermline, Scotland
5 December 1968

Sweden
3

			1	2	3
1	(Scotland) (Sweden)	Muriel Woodcock; Eva Twedberg	6; 11	1; 11
2	(Scotland) (Sweden)	Mary Thompson; Marianne Flykt	5; 11	4; 11
3	(Scotland) (Sweden)	Helen Kelly; Ann-Christine Rosenquist	7; 11	11; 6	5; 11
4	(Scotland) (Sweden)	Wilma Reid / Muriel Woodcock; Kathryn Ekengren / Marianne Flykt	15; 1	15; 5
5	(Scotland) (Sweden)	Maureen Hume / Mary Thompson; Ann-Christine Rosenquist / Eva Twedberg	18; 15	15; 7
6	(Scotland) (Sweden)	Wilma Reid / Muriel Woodcock; Ann-Christine Rosenquist / Eva Twedberg	15; 3	15; 8
7	(Scotland) (Sweden)	Maureen Hume / Mary Thompson; Kathryn Ekengren / Marianne Flykt	15; 13	15; 2

=== Second round ===
Scotland
6
Dresden, East Germany
25 January 1969

East Germany
1

			1	2	3
1	(Scotland) (East Germany)	Maureen Hume; Annemarie Richter	11; 3	5; 11	11; 2
2	(Scotland) (East Germany)	Muriel Woodcock; Beate Herbst	11; 7	11; 4
3	(Scotland) (East Germany)	Wilma Reid; Monika Thiere	6; 11	2; 11
4	(Scotland) (East Germany)	Wilma Reid / Muriel Woodcock; Beate Herbst / Annemarie Richter	15; 2	15; 7
5	(Scotland) (East Germany)	Maureen Hume / Mary Thompson; Monika Thiere / Christel Sommer	18; 15	15; 11
6	(Scotland) (East Germany)	Wilma Reid / Muriel Woodcock; Monika Thiere / Christel Sommer	15; 10	15; 8
7	(Scotland) (East Germany)	Maureen Hume / Mary Thompson; Beate Herbst / Annemarie Richter	15; 5	15; 7

Denmark
7
Copenhagen, Denmark
2 January 1969

South Africa
0

			1	2	3
1	(Denmark) (South Africa)	Imre Rietveld; Wilma Prade	11; 7	11; 8
2	(Denmark) (South Africa)	Anne Flindt; Ann Smith	11; 6	11; 1
3	(Denmark) (South Africa)	Jette Føge; Anneslie Clark	11; 5	11; 1
4	(Denmark) (South Africa)	Anne Flindt / Pernille Mølgaard Hansen; Wilma Prade / Ann Smith	15; 6	15; 4
5	(Denmark) (South Africa)	Karin Jørgensen / Imre Rietveld; Jeanie Audibert / Anneslie Clark	15; 5	15; 8
6	(Denmark) (South Africa)	Anne Flindt / Pernille Mølgaard Hansen; Jeanie Audibert / Anneslie Clark	15; 5	15; 2
7	(Denmark) (South Africa)	Karin Jørgensen / Imre Rietveld; Wilma Prade / Ann Smith	15; 11	15; 13

=== Semi-finals ===
England
5
Stoke-on-Trent, England
23 January 1969

Denmark
2

			1	2	3
1	(England) (Denmark)	Gillian Perrin; Imre Rietveld	12; 9	11; 2
2	(England) (Denmark)	Margaret Boxall; Anne Flindt	11; 8	0; 11	5; 11
3	(England) (Denmark)	Susan Whetnall; Jette Føge	6; 11	6; 11
4	(England) (Denmark)	Julie Charles / Gillian Perrin; Anne Flindt / Pernille Mølgaard Hansen	15; 8	8; 15	15; 10
5	(England) (Denmark)	Margaret Boxall / Susan Whetnall; Lizbeth von Barnekow / Karin Jørgensen	15; 5	15; 8
6	(England) (Denmark)	Julie Charles / Gillian Perrin; Lizbeth von Barnekow / Karin Jørgensen	15; 0	15; 7
7	(England) (Denmark)	Margaret Boxall / Susan Whetnall; Anne Flindt / Pernille Mølgaard Hansen	16; 18	15; 3	15; 10

West Germany
6
Edinburgh, Scotland
16 February 1969

Scotland
1

			1	2	3
1	(West Germany) (Scotland)	Marieluise Wackerow; Maureen Hume	11; 4	11; 5
2	(West Germany) (Scotland)	Gudrun Ziebold; Muriel Woodcock	11; 7	11; 8
3	(West Germany) (Scotland)	Karin Dittberner; Mary Thompson	11; 5	12; 11
4	(West Germany) (Scotland)	Marieluise Wackerow / Gudrun Ziebold; Wilma Reid / Muriel Woodcock	8; 15	15; 10	15; 11
5	(West Germany) (Scotland)	Karin Dittberner / Karin Schäfers; Maureen Hume / Mary Thompson	15; 3	15; 9
6	(West Germany) (Scotland)	Karin Dittberner / Karin Schäfers; Wilma Reid / Muriel Woodcock	15; 7	16; 17	6; 15
7	(West Germany) (Scotland)	Marieluise Wackerow / Gudrun Ziebold; Maureen Hume / Mary Thompson	10; 15	18; 14	15; 9

=== Final ===
England
6
Hamburg, West Germany
28 February 1969

West Germany
1

			1	2	3
1	(England) (West Germany)	Susan Whetnall; Karin Dittberner	11; 4	11; 2
2	(England) (West Germany)	Margaret Boxall; Gudrun Ziebold	11; 2	11; 5
3	(England) (West Germany)	Gillian Perrin; Marieluise Wackerow	8; 11	2; 11
4	(England) (West Germany)	Julie Charles / Gillian Perrin; Karin Dittberner / Karin Schäfers	18; 13	15; 6
5	(England) (West Germany)	Margaret Boxall / Susan Whetnall; Marieluise Wackerow / Gudrun Ziebold	15; 9	6; 15	15; 4
6	(England) (West Germany)	Margaret Boxall / Susan Whetnall; Karin Dittberner / Karin Schäfers	15; 2	15; 10
7	(England) (West Germany)	Julie Charles / Gillian Perrin; Marieluise Wackerow / Gudrun Ziebold	15; 6	15; 5

== Australasian Zone ==
=== Bracket ===
Semi-finals
7 September 1968 – Masterton
Indonesia	6
New Zealand	1
Bye
Australia

Final
21 September 1968 – Perth
Indonesia	7
Australia	0

=== Semi-finals ===
Indonesia
6
Masterton, New Zealand
7 September 1968

New Zealand
1

			1	2	3
1	(Indonesia) (New Zealand)	Minarni; Gaynor Weatherley	11; 6	11; 0
2	(Indonesia) (New Zealand)	Retno Kustijah; Heather Robson	11; 2	11; 4
3	(Indonesia) (New Zealand)	Utami Dewi; Glenys Middelburg	5; 11	4; 11
4	(Indonesia) (New Zealand)	Retno Kustijah / Minarni; Gilda Tompkins / Gaynor Weatherley	15; 1	15; 1
5	(Indonesia) (New Zealand)	Nurhaena / Poppy Tumengkol; Val Gow / Heather Robson	15; 5	15; 11
6	(Indonesia) (New Zealand)	Retno Kustijah / Minarni; Val Gow / Heather Robson	15; 3	15; 3
7	(Indonesia) (New Zealand)	Nurhaena / Poppy Tumengkol; Gilda Tompkins / Gaynor Weatherley	15; 5	15; 3

=== Final ===
Indonesia
7
Perth, Australia
21 September 1968

Australia
0

			1	2	3
1	(Indonesia) (Australia)	Retno Kustijah; Judy Nyirati	11; 3	11; 4
2	(Indonesia) (Australia)	Minarni; Kay Nesbit	11; 1	11; 2
3	(Indonesia) (Australia)	Utami Dewi; Judy Walker	11; 8	11; 4
4	(Indonesia) (Australia)	Retno Kustijah / Minarni; Jan Horton / Kay Nesbit	15; 8	15; 3
5	(Indonesia) (Australia)	Nurhaena / Poppy Tumengkol; Judy Nyirati / Judy Walker	15; 11	15; 7
6	(Indonesia) (Australia)	Nurhaena / Poppy Tumengkol; Jan Horton / Kay Nesbit	15; 11	15; 3
7	(Indonesia) (Australia)	Retno Kustijah / Minarni; Judy Nyirati / Judy Walker	15; 3	15; 3
