= 1966 Uber Cup knockout stage =

Badminton tournament

The knockout stage for the 1966 Uber Cup began on 14 May 1966 with the first round and ended on 21 May with the final tie.

== Qualified teams ==
The teams that won their zonal tie qualified for the final knockout stage.

Group	Winners
A	United States
B	Japan
C	Canada
D	England
E	Indonesia

== Bracket ==
First round
United States
Bye
14 May 1966 – Napier
Japan	5
Indonesia	2
14 May 1966 – Dunedin
Canada	1
England	6

Second round
United States
Bye
17 May 1966 – Auckland
Japan	4
England	3

Challenge round
21 May 1966 – Wellington
United States	2
Japan	5

== First round ==
=== Indonesia vs Japan ===
Indonesia
2
Napier, New Zealand
14 May 1966

Japan
5

			1	2	3
1	(Indonesia) (Japan)	Minarni; Noriko Takagi	3; 11	0; 11
2	(Indonesia) (Japan)	Retno Koestijah; Fumiko Yokoi	11; 5	3; 11	9; 11
3	(Indonesia) (Japan)	Corry Kawilarang; Mitsuko Yokoyama	4; 11	8; 11
4	(Indonesia) (Japan)	Retno Koestijah / Minarni; Kazuko Gotō / Noriko Takagi	15; 5	15; 8
5	(Indonesia) (Japan)	Megah Idawati / Corry Kawilarang; Hiroe Amano / Tomoko Takahashi	15; 10	10; 15	11; 15
6	(Indonesia) (Japan)	Megah Idawati / Corry Kawilarang; Kazuko Gotō / Noriko Takagi	8; 15	3; 15
7	(Indonesia) (Japan)	Retno Koestijah / Minarni; Hiroe Amano / Tomoko Takahashi	15; 5	15; 6

=== England vs Canada ===
England
6
Dunedin, New Zealand
14 May 1966

Canada
1

			1	2	3
1	(England) (Canada)	Angela Bairstow; Jean Folinsbee	11; 3	11; 3
2	(England) (Canada)	Ursula Smith; Sharon Whittaker	9; 12	5; 11
3	(England) (Canada)	Jenny Horton; Jean Miller	11; 6	11; 7
4	(England) (Canada)	Margaret Barrand / Jenny Horton; Marjory Shedd / Dorothy Tinline	15; 10	15; 7
5	(England) (Canada)	Angela Bairstow / Iris Rogers; Jean Miller / Sharon Whittaker	15; 12	15; 13
6	(England) (Canada)	Angela Bairstow / Iris Rogers; Marjory Shedd / Dorothy Tinline	15; 8	5; 15	15; 4
7	(England) (Canada)	Margaret Barrand / Jenny Horton; Jean Miller / Sharon Whittaker	15; 12	15; 9

== Consolation playoff ==
The teams that were defeated in the first round were relegated to a consolation playoff. Indonesia, who were defeated by Japan in the first round, won 6–1 against Canada, who were defeated by England in the second round.

== Second round ==
=== England vs Japan ===
England
3
Auckland, New Zealand
17 May 1966

Japan
4

			1	2	3
1	(England) (Japan)	Angela Bairstow; Noriko Takagi	7; 11	2; 11
2	(England) (Japan)	Ursula Smith; Fumiko Yokoi	2; 11	7; 11
3	(England) (Japan)	Jenny Horton; Mitsuko Yokoyama	5; 11	1; 11
4	(England) (Japan)	Margaret Barrand / Jenny Horton; Kazuko Gotō / Noriko Takagi	17; 15	15; 12
5	(England) (Japan)	Angela Bairstow / Iris Rogers; Hiroe Amano / Tomoko Takahashi	15; 9	15; 9
6	(England) (Japan)	Angela Bairstow / Iris Rogers; Kazuko Gotō / Noriko Takagi	8; 15	12; 15
7	(England) (Japan)	Margaret Barrand / Jenny Horton; Hiroe Amano / Tomoko Takahashi	15; 8	18; 13

== Challenge round ==
=== United States vs Japan ===
United States
2
Wellington, New Zealand
21 May 1966

Japan
5

			1	2	3
1	(United States) (Japan)	Judy Hashman; Noriko Takagi	9; 12	7; 11
2	(United States) (Japan)	Caroline Jensen; Fumiko Yokoi	11; 12	3; 11
3	(United States) (Japan)	Tyna Barinaga; Mitsuko Yokoyama	3; 11	8; 11
4	(United States) (Japan)	Judy Hashman / Rosine Jones; Kazuko Gotō / Noriko Takagi	18; 14	15; 9
5	(United States) (Japan)	Tyna Barinaga / Caroline Jensen; Hiroe Amano / Tomoko Takahashi	15; 9	9; 15	7; 15
6	(United States) (Japan)	Tyna Barinaga / Caroline Jensen; Kazuko Gotō / Noriko Takagi	2; 15	16; 17
7	(United States) (Japan)	Judy Hashman / Rosine Jones; Hiroe Amano / Tomoko Takahashi	15; 8	15; 4
