= 1978 Uber Cup qualification =

Tournament details
- Dates: 23 October 1977 – 8 April 1978
- Location: Asian zone: Kuala Lumpur; Tokyo American zone: San Diego European zone: Brae; Copenhagen; Edinburgh; Haarlem; Perth; Tilburg; Washington

The qualifying process for the 1978 Uber Cup took place from 23 October 1977 to 8 April 1978 to decide the final teams which will play in the final tournament.

== Qualification process ==
The qualification process is divided into four regions, the Asian Zone, the American Zone, the European Zone and the Australasian Zone. Teams in their respective zone will compete in a knockout format. Three singles and four doubles will be played on the day of competition. The teams that win their respective zone will earn a place in the final tournament to be held in Tokyo.

The winners of the 1975 Uber Cup, Indonesia were exempted from the qualifying rounds and automatically qualified for the final tournament. New Zealand also qualified for the final tournament as hosts. With New Zealand's exemption from the Australasian zone, Australia also qualified for the final tournament as sole representatives of the Australasian zone.

=== Qualified teams ===
Country	Qualified as	Qualified on	Final appearance
New Zealand	1978 Uber Cup hosts	October 1977	5th
Indonesia	1975 Uber Cup winners	6 June 1975	6th
Japan	Asian Zone winners	8 April 1978	5th
Denmark	European Zone winners	30 March 1978	4th
United States	American Zone winners	20 November 1977	6th
Australia	Sole representative of the Australasian Zone	23 October 1977	2nd

== Asian Zone ==
=== Bracket ===
Semi-finals
14 December 1977 – Kuala Lumpur
Malaysia	6
India	1
23 October 1977 – Tokyo
Japan	7
South Korea	0

Final
8 April 1978 – Kuala Lumpur
Malaysia	3
Japan	4

=== Semi-finals ===
Malaysia
6
Kuala Lumpur, Malaysia
14 December 1977

India
1

			1	2	3
1	(Malaysia) (India)	Sylvia Ng; Latha Kailash	11; 0	11; 1
2	(Malaysia) (India)	Katherine Teh; Ami Ghia	12; 10	11; 3
3	(Malaysia) (India)	Yap Hei Lin; Kanwal Thakar Singh	11; 6	11; 6
4	(Malaysia) (India)	Rosalind Singha Ang / Sylvia Ng; Ami Ghia / Kanwal Thakar Singh	15; 1	15; 6
5	(Malaysia) (India)	Khaw Mooi Eng / Yap Hei Lin; Sujata Jain / Noreen Padua	15; 13	15; 10
6	(Malaysia) (India)	Khaw Mooi Eng / Yap Hei Lin; Ami Ghia / Kanwal Thakar Singh	3; 15	8; 15
7	(Malaysia) (India)	Rosalind Singha Ang / Sylvia Ng; Sujata Jain / Noreen Padua	15; 1	15; 3

Japan
7
Tokyo, Japan
23 October 1977

South Korea
0

			1	2	3
1	(Japan) (South Korea)	Hiroe Yuki; Park Ok-yeon	11; 12	11; 2	11; 1
2	(Japan) (South Korea)	Atsuko Tokuda; Song Hyang-soon	11; 6	11; 2
3	(Japan) (South Korea)	Saori Kondo; Oh Yeon-han	11; 7	11; 5
4	(Japan) (South Korea)	Mikiko Takada / Atsuko Tokuda; Park Ok-yeon / Song Hyang-soon	15; 6	15; 5
5	(Japan) (South Korea)	Saori Kondo / Hiroe Yuki; Oh Yeon-han / Kang Haeng-suk	17; 15	15; 2
6	(Japan) (South Korea)	Saori Kondo / Hiroe Yuki; Park Ok-yeon / Song Hyang-soon	15; 9	15; 9
7	(Japan) (South Korea)	Mikiko Takada / Atsuko Tokuda; Oh Yeon-han / Kang Haeng-suk	15; 11	13; 15	15; 10

=== Final ===
Japan
4
Kuala Lumpur, Malaysia
8 April 1978

Malaysia
3

			1	2	3
1	(Japan) (Malaysia)	Saori Kondo; Sylvia Ng	11; 12	4; 11
2	(Japan) (Malaysia)	Hiroe Yuki; Katherine Teh	11; 8	10; 12	3; 11
3	(Japan) (Malaysia)	Atsuko Tokuda; Yap Hei Lin	11; 0	11; 2
4	(Japan) (Malaysia)	Noriko Nakayama / Emiko Ueno; Sylvia Ng / Ong Ah Hong	15; 8	15; 8
5	(Japan) (Malaysia)	Mikiko Takada / Atsuko Tokuda; Katherine Teh / Yap Hei Lin	15; 5	15; 2
6	(Japan) (Malaysia)	Mikiko Takada / Atsuko Tokuda; Sylvia Ng / Ong Ah Hong	15; 11	15; 4
7	(Japan) (Malaysia)	Noriko Nakayama / Emiko Ueno; Katherine Teh / Yap Hei Lin				w/o

== American Zone ==
=== Bracket ===
Final
19 November 1977 – San Diego
United States	5
Republic оf China	2

=== Final ===
United States
5
San Diego, United States
19–20 November 1977

Republic оf China
2

			1	2	3
1	(United States) (Taiwan)	Madalene Steinbroner; Yu Yu-e	11; 12	11; 8	11; 7
2	(United States) (Taiwan)	Judianne Kelly; Lin Su	11; 5	1; 11	9; 11
3	(United States) (Taiwan)	Cheryl Carton; Chen Yu-jen	10; 12	11; 5	11; 6
4	(United States) (Taiwan)	Diana Osterhues / Janet Wilts; Lin Su / Yu Yu-e	17; 16	8; 15	8; 15
5	(United States) (Taiwan)	Pam Bristol Brady / Judianne Kelly; Chen Yu-jen / Liu Shiu-ying	15; 3	15; 7
6	(United States) (Taiwan)	Pam Bristol Brady / Judianne Kelly; Lin Su / Yu Yu-e	15; 10	15; 9
7	(United States) (Taiwan)	Diana Osterhues / Janet Wilts; Chen Yu-jen / Liu Shiu-ying	15; 5	15; 3

== European Zone ==
=== Bracket ===
First round
West Germany
Bye
2 November 1977 – Brae
Scotland	5
Norway	2
Bye
Bye
Denmark
Bye
9 November 1977 – Tilburg
Netherlands	4
Sweden	3
Canada
Bye
Bye
Bye
Bye
England

Second round
24 November 1977 – Edinburgh
West Germany	3
Scotland	4
Denmark
Bye
7 February 1978 – Haarlem
Netherlands	5
Canada	2
Bye
England

Semi-finals
12 January 1978 – Perth
Scotland	0
Denmark	7
16 February 1978 – Washington
Netherlands	1
England	6

Final
30 March 1978 – Copenhagen
Denmark	5
England	2

=== First round ===
Scotland
5
Brae, Scotland
2 November 1977

Norway
2

			1	2	3
1	(Scotland) (Norway)	Joanne Flockhart; Else Thoresen	5; 11	9; 11
2	(Scotland) (Norway)	Pamela Hamilton; Kari Histøl	2; 11	11; 5	4; 11
3	(Scotland) (Norway)	Anne Johnstone; Kjersti Torp	11; 0	11; 2
4	(Scotland) (Norway)	Joanne Flockhart / Christine Stewart; Kari Histøl / Else Thoresen	15; 8	15; 0
5	(Scotland) (Norway)	Pamela Hamilton / Anne Johnstone; Kristin Rasmussen / Kjersti Torp	15; 1	15; 3
6	(Scotland) (Norway)	Pamela Hamilton / Anne Johnstone; Kari Histøl / Else Thoresen	15; 8	15; 9
7	(Scotland) (Norway)	Joanne Flockhart / Christine Stewart; Kristin Rasmussen / Else Thoresen	15; 2	15; 0

Netherlands
4
Tilburg, Netherlands
9 November 1977

Sweden
3

			1	2	3
1	(Netherlands) (Sweden)	Joke van Beusekom; Anette Börjesson	12; 10	11; 3
2	(Netherlands) (Sweden)	Marjan Ridder; Karin Lindquist	11; 3	11; 3
3	(Netherlands) (Sweden)	Hanke de Kort; Cecilia Jeppson	5; 11	0; 11
4	(Netherlands) (Sweden)	Marjan Ridder / Joke van Beusekom; Britt-Marie Larsson / Agneta Lundh	15; 3	15; 5
5	(Netherlands) (Sweden)	Hanke de Kort / Marja Ravelli; Anette Börjesson / Karin Lindquist	12; 15	11; 15
6	(Netherlands) (Sweden)	Hanke de Kort / Marja Ravelli; Britt-Marie Larsson / Agneta Lundh	13; 3	6; 8
7	(Netherlands) (Sweden)	Marjan Ridder / Joke van Beusekom; Anette Börjesson / Karin Lindquist	15; 6	15; 4

=== Second round ===
West Germany
3
Edinburgh, Scotland
24 November 1977

Scotland
4

			1	2	3
1	(West Germany) (Scotland)	Brigitte Steden; Joanne Flockhart	11; 3	11; 4
2	(West Germany) (Scotland)	Eva-Maria Zwiebler; Pamela Hamilton	7; 11	11; 0	11; 5
3	(West Germany) (Scotland)	Elke Weber; Anne Johnstone	11; 3	11; 1
4	(West Germany) (Scotland)	Brigitte Steden / Marieluise Zizmann; Joanne Flockhart / Christine Stewart	13; 15	10; 15
5	(West Germany) (Scotland)	Ingrid Morsch / Elke Weber; Pamela Hamilton / Anne Johnstone	6; 15	16; 15
6	(West Germany) (Scotland)	Ingrid Morsch / Elke Weber; Joanne Flockhart / Christine Stewart	9; 15	8; 15
7	(West Germany) (Scotland)	Brigitte Steden / Marieluise Zizmann; Pamela Hamilton / Anne Johnstone	15; 10	15; 4

Canada
2
Haarlem, Netherlands
7 February 1978

Netherlands
5

			1	2	3
1	(Canada) (Netherlands)	Wendy Clarkson; Joke van Beusekom	11; 3	6; 11	12; 10
2	(Canada) (Netherlands)	Jane Youngberg; Marjan Ridder	8; 11	7; 11
3	(Canada) (Netherlands)	Barb O'Brien; Hanke de Kort	3; 11	5; 11
4	(Canada) (Netherlands)	Claire Backhouse / Sharon Crawford; Maureen Oskam / Marja Ravelli	9; 15	11; 15
5	(Canada) (Netherlands)	Wendy Clarkson / Jane Youngberg; Marjan Ridder / Joke van Beusekom	4; 15	8; 15
6	(Canada) (Netherlands)	Wendy Clarkson / Jane Youngberg; Maureen Oskam / Marja Ravelli	15; 12	15; 11
7	(Canada) (Netherlands)	Claire Backhouse / Sharon Crawford; Marjan Ridder / Joke van Beusekom	15; 7	11; 15	15; 6

=== Semi-finals ===
Denmark
7
Perth, Scotland
12 January 1978

Scotland
0

			1	2	3
1	(Denmark) (Scotland)	Lene Køppen; Joanne Flockhart	11; 2	11; 4
2	(Denmark) (Scotland)	Pia Nielsen; Pamela Hamilton	11; 8	11; 9
3	(Denmark) (Scotland)	Inge Borgstrøm; Anne Johnstone	3; 11	11; 7	11; 6
4	(Denmark) (Scotland)	Lene Køppen / Imre Nielsen; Joanne Flockhart / Christine Stewart	15; 7	15; 11
5	(Denmark) (Scotland)	Inge Borgstrøm / Pia Nielsen; Pamela Hamilton / Anne Johnstone	15; 10	15; 2
6	(Denmark) (Scotland)	Inge Borgstrøm / Pia Nielsen; Joanne Flockhart / Christine Stewart	15; 7	11; 15	15; 10
7	(Denmark) (Scotland)	Lene Køppen / Imre Nielsen; Pamela Hamilton / Anne Johnstone	18; 13	15; 6

England
6
Washington, England
16 February 1978

Netherlands
1

			1	2	3
1	(England) (Netherlands)	Jane Webster; Joke van Beusekom	9; 11	3; 11
2	(England) (Netherlands)	Karen Bridge; Hanke de Kort	11; 7	11; 7
3	(England) (Netherlands)	Nora Perry; Maureen Oskam	11; 4	11; 6
4	(England) (Netherlands)	Nora Perry / Anne Statt; Hanke de Kort / Marja Ravelli	15; 7	15; 1
5	(England) (Netherlands)	Barbara Sutton / Jane Webster; Maureen Oskam / Joke van Beusekom	5; 15	15; 9	18; 15
6	(England) (Netherlands)	Barbara Sutton / Jane Webster; Hanke de Kort / Marja Ravelli	12; 15	17; 15	15; 1
7	(England) (Netherlands)	Nora Perry / Anne Statt; Maureen Oskam / Joke van Beusekom	15; 5	15; 7

=== Final ===
England
2
Copenhagen, England
30 March 1978

Denmark
5

			1	2	3
1	(England) (Denmark)	Jane Webster; Lene Køppen	4; 11	2; 11
2	(England) (Denmark)	Karen Bridge; Inge Borgstrøm	5; 11	11; 4	11; 8
3	(England) (Denmark)	Margaret Lockwood; Pia Nielsen	0; 11	10; 12
4	(England) (Denmark)	Barbara Sutton / Jane Webster; Lene Køppen / Imre Nielsen	9; 15	17; 15	14; 18
5	(England) (Denmark)	Nora Perry / Anne Statt; Inge Borgstrøm / Pia Nielsen	18; 13	10; 15	15; 12
6	(England) (Denmark)	Nora Perry / Anne Statt; Lene Køppen / Imre Nielsen	18; 13	4; 15	14; 17
7	(England) (Denmark)	Barbara Sutton / Jane Webster; Inge Borgstrøm / Pia Nielsen	12; 15	4; 15
