= Tambay =

Tambay is a surname. Notable people with the surname include:

- Adrien Tambay (born 1991), French racing driver
- Damayanti Tambay (born 1948), Indian badminton player
- Patrick Tambay (1949–2022), French racing driver
- Vijay Vasant Tambay (born 1943), officer of the Indian Air Force

== See also ==
- Oplan Tambay, law enforcement campaign in the Philippines
- Tambay (EP), EP by Sponge Cola
