= 1968 All England Badminton Championships =

1968 All England Championships
Tournament details
- Dates: 19 March 1968– 23 March 1968
- Edition: 58th
- Venue: Wembley Arena
- Location: London

The 1968 All England Championships was a badminton tournament held at Wembley Arena, London, England, from 19–23 March 1968.

== Final results ==
Category	Winners	Runners-up	Score
Men's singles	(Indonesia) Rudy Hartono	(Malaysia) Tan Aik Huang	15-12, 15-9
Women's singles	(Sweden) Eva Twedberg	(Indonesia) Minarni	11-6, 11-2
Men's doubles	(Denmark) Henning Borch & Erland Kops	(Malaysia) Ng Boon Bee & Tan Yee Khan	15-6 15-4
Women's doubles	(Indonesia) Minarni & Retno Koestijah	(Japan) Noriko Takagi & Hiroe Amano	15-5 15-8
Mixed doubles	(England) Tony Jordan & Sue Pound	(Scotland) Bob McCoig & Muriel Woodcock	15-6, 15-6

Muljadi was formerly known as Ang Tjin Siang. Mary O'Sullivan married and became Mary Bryan.

== Men's singles ==
=== Section 1 ===
Round of 32
(Indonesia) Rudy Hartono +	15	15
(England) Paul Whetnall	5	7
(Denmark) Henning Borch	15	15
(West Germany) Torsten Winter	11	6
(Sweden) Sture Johnsson	15	10	15
(Canada) Jamie Paulson	10	15	0
(Denmark) Jorgen Mortensen	5	15	15
(Malaysia) Yew Chen Hok	15	6	8
(Denmark) Svend Andersen Pri +	15	15
(England) Brian White	9	4
(Malaysia) Punch Gunalan	15	15
(West Germany) Willi Braun	4	12
(Denmark) Elo Hansen	15	15
(England) David Eddy	6	8
(Thailand) Sangob Rattanusorn	15	16	15
(Sweden) Kurt Johnsson	9	18	5

Round of 16
(Indonesia) Hartono	15	15
(Denmark) Borch	5	4
(Sweden) Johnsson	15	15
(Denmark) Mortensen	8	5
(Denmark) Andersen Pri	18	15
(Malaysia) Gunalan	13	8
(Denmark) Hansen	15	18
(Thailand) Rattanusorn	9	14

Quarter-finals
(Indonesia) Hartono	15	15
(Sweden) Johnsson	5	8
(Denmark) Andersen Pri	17	15
(Denmark) Hansen	14	8

Semi-finals
(Indonesia) Hartono	15	12	15
(Denmark) Andersen Pri	9	15	9

=== Section 2 ===
Round of 32
(Malaysia) Tan Aik Huang +	15	15
(England) S J Shaw	2	2
(West Germany) Wolfgang Bochow	15	15
(England) J Tank	10	7
(Thailand) Channarong Ratanaseangsuang	15	15
(Malaysia) Abdul Rahman	11	8
(Singapore) Lee Kin Tat	15	11	15
(Japan) Takeshi Miyanaga	9	15	8
(Denmark) Erland Kops +	15	15
(West Germany) Franz Beinvogel	5	6
(Indonesia) Muljadi	4	15	10
(Malaysia) Teh Kew San	15	13	9ret
(Japan) Ippei Kojima	15	15
(England) Colin Beacom	5	3
(Malaysia) Tan Aik Mong	15	15
(Denmark) Niels Norgaard	7	8

Round of 16
(Malaysia) Aik Huang	15	10	15
(West Germany) Bochow	5	15	7
(Thailand) Channarong	15	15
(Singapore) Kin Tat	4	6
(Denmark) Kops	13	15	15
(Indonesia) Muljadi	15	5	4
(Japan) Kojima	15	15
(Malaysia) Mong	6	5

Quarter-finals
(Malaysia) Aik Huang	15	15
(Thailand) Channarong	10	7
(Denmark) Kops	15	15
(Japan) Kojima	12	9

Semi-finals
(Malaysia) Aik Huang	15	15
(Denmark) Kops	9	9

+ Denotes seed

== Women's singles ==
=== Section 1 ===
Round of 32
(Sweden) Eva Twedberg	11	11
(England) Julie Charles	2	1
(Denmark) Lene Christensen	12	11
(West Germany) Gerda Schumacher	10	7
(Denmark) Lizbeth Von Barnekow	11	11
(Australia) Fay Truscott	0	3
(England) Sue Pound	11	11
(Netherlands) Felice De Nooyer	7	7
(West Germany) Irmgard Latz	12	11
(Denmark) Anne Flindt	10	4
(England) Margaret Boxall	12	11
(Japan) Hiroe Amano	9	7
(Netherlands) Agnes Geene	11	11
(England) Angela Bairstow	8	7
(Denmark) Karin Jørgensen	11	12
(Republic of Ireland) Yvonne Kelly	1	10

Round of 16
(Sweden) Twedberg	11	11
(Denmark) Christensen	4	3
(Denmark) Von Barnekow	11	11
(England) Pound	6	1
(West Germany) Latz	12	11
(England) Boxall	10	4
(Netherlands) Geene	12	11
(Denmark) Jorgensen	11	3

Quarter-finals
(Sweden) Twedberg	11	11
(Denmark) Von Barnekow	2	2
(West Germany) Latz	11	8	12
(Netherlands) Geene	1	11	10

Semi-finals
(Sweden) Twedberg	11	11
(West Germany) Latz	9	7

=== Section 2 ===
Round of 32
(Indonesia) Minarni Soedaryanto	11	11
(England) Phyllis Kirkwood	0	2
(Netherlands) Margot Ter Metz	11	11
(Scotland) Mary Thompson	8	4
(West Germany) Marieluise Wackerow	11	11
(Netherlands) Lilli Ter Metz	5	9
(Republic of Ireland) Mary Bryan	11	12
(Denmark) Bente Sorensen	1	10
(Japan) Noriko Takagi	11	11
(Netherlands) Joke Van Beusekom	4	0
(Denmark) Pernille Mølgaard Hansen	11	11
(England) Iris Rogers	6	5
(England) Ursula Smith	11	11
(England) Charlotte Lindsay	4	8
(West Germany) Gudrun Ziebold	w/o
(Denmark) Ulla Strand

Round of 16
(Indonesia) Minarni	11	11
(Netherlands) Ter Metz	0	1
(West Germany) Wackerow	11	11
(Republic of Ireland) Bryan	6	5
(Japan) Takagi	11	11
(Denmark) Molgaard-Hansen	6	3
(England) Smith	8	11	11
(West Germany) Ziebold	11	5	2

Quarter-finals
(Indonesia) Minarni	11	11
(West Germany) Wackerow	6	5
(Japan) Takagi	11	11
(England) Smith	2	0

Semi-finals
(Indonesia) Minarni	11	8	11
(Japan) Takagi	0	11
