= 1978 Uber Cup knockout stage =

Badminton tournament

The knockout stage for the 1978 Uber Cup began on 13 May 1978 with the first round and ended on 20 May with the final tie.

== Qualified teams ==
The teams that won their zonal tie qualified for the final knockout stage.

| Group | Winners |
|---|---|
| H | New Zealand (hosts) |
| A | Indonesia |
| B | Japan |
| C | United States |
| D | Denmark |
| E | Australia |

== Bracket ==
First round
Indonesia
Bye
13 May 1978 – Auckland
New Zealand | 0
United States | 7
14 May 1978 – Auckland
Australia | 0
Japan | 7
Bye
Denmark

Second round
16 May 1978 – Auckland
Indonesia | 7
United States | 0
17 May 1978 – Auckland
Japan | 6
Denmark | 1

Challenge round
20 May 1978 – Auckland
Indonesia | 2
Japan | 5

== First round ==
=== United States vs New Zealand ===
United States
7
Auckland Badminton Association Hall
13 May 1978

New Zealand
0

| | | | 1 | 2 | 3 |
|---|---|---|---|---|---|
| 1 | (United States) (New Zealand) | Cindy Baker; Mary Livingston | 12; 10 | 11; 3 |
| 2 | (United States) (New Zealand) | Judianne Kelly; Robin Denton | 2; 11 | 11; 9 | 11; 9 |
| 3 | (United States) (New Zealand) | Cheryl White; Alison Branfield | 11; 6 | 11; 2 |
| 4 | (United States) (New Zealand) | Pam Bristol Brady / Judianne Kelly; Mary Livingston / Allison Sinton | 15; 3 | 15; 6 |
| 5 | (United States) (New Zealand) | Diana Osterhues / Janet Wilts; Alison Branfield / Allison Sinton | 15; 6 | 15; 3 |
| 6 | (United States) (New Zealand) | Pam Bristol Brady / Judianne Kelly; Alison Branfield / Allison Sinton | 15; 11 | 17; 14 |
| 7 | (United States) (New Zealand) | Diana Osterhues / Janet Wilts; Mary Livingston / Allison Sinton | 15; 6 | 15; 3 |

=== Japan vs Australia ===
Japan
7
Auckland Badminton Association Hall
14 May 1978

Australia
0

| | | | 1 | 2 | 3 |
|---|---|---|---|---|---|
| 1 | (Japan) (Australia) | Atsuko Tokuda; Audrey Swaby | 11; 1 | 11; 0 |
| 2 | (Japan) (Australia) | Hiroe Yuki; Susan Daly | 11; 3 | 11; 0 |
| 3 | (Japan) (Australia) | Saori Kondo; Joan Jones | 11; 2 | 11; 0 |
| 4 | (Japan) (Australia) | Mikiko Takada / Atsuko Tokuda; Beverley Hite / Audrey Swaby | 15; 4 | 15; 9 |
| 5 | (Japan) (Australia) | Emiko Ueno / Yoshiko Yonekura; Susan Daly / Joan Jones | 15; 4 | 15; 3 |
| 6 | (Japan) (Australia) | Emiko Ueno / Yoshiko Yonekura; Beverley Hite / Audrey Swaby | 15; 4 | 15; 1 |
| 7 | (Japan) (Australia) | Mikiko Takada / Atsuko Tokuda; Susan Daly / Joan Jones | 15; 1 | 15; 3 |

== Second round ==
=== Indonesia vs United States ===
Indonesia
7
Auckland Badminton Association Hall
16 May 1978

United States
0

| | | | 1 | 2 | 3 |
|---|---|---|---|---|---|
| 1 | (Indonesia) (United States) | Verawaty Wiharjo; Cheryl Carton | 11; 3 | 11; 8 |
| 2 | (Indonesia) (United States) | Tjan So Gwan; Judianne Kelly | 11; 2 | 11; 9 |
| 3 | (Indonesia) (United States) | Ivana Lie; Cindy Baker | 8; 11 | 11; 7 | 11; 2 |
| 4 | (Indonesia) (United States) | Imelda Wiguna / Verawaty Wiharjo; Diana Osterhues / Janet Wilts | 15; 9 | 15; 12 |
| 5 | (Indonesia) (United States) | Ivana Lie / Regina Masli; Pam Bristol Brady / Judianne Kelly | 15; 12 | 12; 15 | 15; 5 |
| 6 | (Indonesia) (United States) | Ivana Lie / Regina Masli; Diana Osterhues / Janet Wilts | 17; 18 | 15; 6 | 15; 12 |
| 7 | (Indonesia) (United States) | Imelda Wiguna / Verawaty Wiharjo; Pam Bristol Brady / Judianne Kelly | 15; 11 | 15; 8 |

=== Japan vs Denmark ===
Japan
6
Auckland Badminton Association Hall
17 May 1978

Denmark
1

| | | | 1 | 2 | 3 |
|---|---|---|---|---|---|---|
| 1 | (Japan) (Denmark) | Hiroe Yuki; Lene Køppen | 5; 11 | 10; 12 |
| 2 | (Japan) (Denmark) | Atsuko Tokuda; Pia Nielsen | 11; 1 | 12; 10 |
| 3 | (Japan) (Denmark) | Saori Kondo; Inge Borgstrøm | 11; 6 | 11; 3 |
| 4 | (Japan) (Denmark) | Emiko Ueno / Yoshiko Yonekura; Lene Køppen / Imre Nielsen | 15; 5 | 15; 12 |
| 5 | (Japan) (Denmark) | Mikiko Takada / Atsuko Tokuda; Inge Borgstrøm / Pia Nielsen | 15; 11 | 15; 4 |
| 6 | (Japan) (Denmark) | Mikiko Takada / Atsuko Tokuda; Lene Køppen / Imre Nielsen | 15; 4 | 14; 10 | | retired |
| 7 | (Japan) (Denmark) | Emiko Ueno / Yoshiko Yonekura; Inge Borgstrøm / Pia Nielsen | 15; 11 | 15; 10 |

== Challenge round ==
The final match saw Indonesia and Japan duel for a fourth consecutive time in the Uber Cup final, this time with Indonesia going all out to defend its title. Japan won the first singles when Saori Kondo of Japan, who reached the finals of the All England Open two months prior, defeated Indonesia's Ivana Lie 11–3, 11–3. Both teams were at 1–1 when Verawaty Wiharjo of Indonesia beat former All England champion Hiroe Yuki 11–3, 11–6. The third singles went Japan's way as Atsuko Tokuda won against Tjan So Gwan 11–5, 11–4 and gained Japan a 3–1 lead against their opponents.

Indonesia's title was in jeopardy when Imelda Wiguna and Verawaty Wiharjo trailed one game against Emiko Ueno and Yoshiko Yonekura. Wiguna and Wiharjo then came back to defeat their opponents in the next two sets, giving the team hope. The second doubles match saw Indonesia's Uber Cup reign come to an end as Regina Masli and Theresia Widiastuti lost 11–15, 12–15 to Mikiko Takada and Atsuko Tokuda. At 4–2, Japan regained the Uber Cup once again. Japan won the last doubles to finish the tie 5–2.

=== Indonesia vs Japan ===
Indonesia
2
Auckland Badminton Association Hall
20 May 1978

Japan
5

| | | | 1 | 2 | 3 |
|---|---|---|---|---|---|
| 1 | (Indonesia) (Japan) | Ivana Lie; Saori Kondo | 3; 11 | 3; 11 |
| 2 | (Indonesia) (Japan) | Verawaty Wiharjo; Hiroe Yuki | 11; 3 | 11; 6 |
| 3 | (Indonesia) (Japan) | Tjan So Gwan; Atsuko Tokuda | 5; 11 | 4; 11 |
| 4 | (Indonesia) (Japan) | Imelda Wiguna / Verawaty Wiharjo; Emiko Ueno / Yoshiko Yonekura | 10; 15 | 15; 8 | 15; 12 |
| 5 | (Indonesia) (Japan) | Regina Masli / Theresia Widiastuti; Mikiko Takada / Atsuko Tokuda | 11; 15 | 12; 15 |
| 6 | (Indonesia) (Japan) | Imelda Wiguna / Verawaty Wiharjo; Mikiko Takada / Atsuko Tokuda | 5; 15 | 7; 15 |
| 7 | (Indonesia) (Japan) | Regina Masli / Theresia Widiastuti; Emiko Ueno / Yoshiko Yonekura | 10; 15 | 8; 15 |
