= 2024 Small States of Europe Badminton Championships =

Tournament details
- Dates: 1 – 3 November
- Edition: 2
- Nations: 9
- Venue: Lefkotheo
- Location: Nicosia, Cyprus

Champions
- Mixed teams: Iceland

The second edition of the Small States of Europe Badminton Championships was held in Nicosia, Cyprus, from 1 to 3 November 2024. Nine national teams competed in the championships.

== Host selection ==
After the final of the 2023 Small States of Europe Badminton Championships, Cyprus was announced as the official host for the next edition of the championships, with Nicosia being the host city.

== Medalists ==
Event	Gold	Silver	Bronze
Mixed team	Iceland; Davíð Bjarni Björnsson; Kristófer Darri Finnsson; Einar Oli Gudbjornsson; Róbert Ingi Huldarsson; Lilja Bu; Arna Karen Jóhannsdóttir; Drífa Harðardóttir; Una Hrund Örvar	Greenland; Sebastian Bendtsen; Toke Ketwa-Driefer; Julian King; Maluk Tiger; Cecilia Josenius; Sara Lindskov Jacobsen; Tina Rafaelsen; Emilie Sørensen	Cyprus; Iakovos Acheriotis; Panayiotis Adamou; Christos Georgiou; Konstantinos Giannopoulos; Evelthon Hadjipantelis; Andreas Ioannou; Nikolas Kokosis; Elias Nicolaou; Christos Papadouris; Ioannis Tambourlas; Varvara Architektonidou; Aggeliki Avraam; Eleni Charalambous; Eleni Christodoulou; Sofia Ioannou; Chara Michael; Ioanna Pissi; Efi Zanou

=== Medal table ===
* Host nation (Cyprus)

Rank	Nation	Gold	Silver	Bronze	Total
1	Iceland	1	0	0	1
2	Greenland	0	1	0	1
3	Cyprus*	0	0	1	1
Totals (3 entries)		1	1	1	3

== Tournament ==
The 2024 Small States of Europe Badminton Championships will crown the best national badminton teams between European microstates.

=== Venue ===
This tournament was held at the Lefkotheo Indoor Hall in Nicosia, Cyprus.

=== Draw ===
The draw was announced on 31 October 2024. The group stage consists of 3 groups, Group A, Group B and Group C. A total of nine teams were invited to participate in the tournament. Monaco made their debut in the tournament after the team's absence in the last edition.

Group A	Group B	Group C
Faroe Islands; Iceland; Liechtenstein	Cyprus; Gibraltar; Monaco	Greenland; Isle of Man; Malta

== Group stage ==
All times are Eastern European Time (UTC+02:00).

=== Group A ===
Pos	Team	Pld	W	L	MF	MA	MD	GF	GA	GD	PF	PA	PD	Pts	Qualification
1	Iceland	2	2	0	9	1	+8	19	2	+17	418	246	+172	2	1st–3rd place
2	Faroe Islands	2	1	1	6	4	+2	12	9	+3	371	306	+65	1	4th–6th place
3	Liechtenstein	2	0	2	0	10	−10	0	20	−20	183	420	−237	0	7th–9th place

Source: TS

==== Faroe Islands vs. Liechtenstein ====
Faroe Islands
5
Lefkotheo Indoor Hall, Court 1
1 November 2024, 10:00

Liechtenstein
0

			1	2	3
1	(Faroe Islands) (Liechtenstein)	Rúni Øster / Miriam í Grótinum; Stanley Wee / Chanisa Wariwong	21; 9	21; 6
2	(Faroe Islands) (Liechtenstein)	Árant á Mýrini; Mirco Lareida	21; 13	21; 10
3	(Faroe Islands) (Liechtenstein)	Sanna Thorkildshøj; Chow Jing You	21; 4	21; 8
4	(Faroe Islands) (Liechtenstein)	Magnus Dal-Christiansen / Jónas Djurhuus; Sebastian Schwald / Soh Sin Siang	21; 14	21; 14
5	(Faroe Islands) (Liechtenstein)	Lena Maria Joensen / Bjarnhild Justinussen; Oh Ying San / Chanisa Wariwong	21; 11	21; 9

==== Iceland vs. Liechtenstein ====
Iceland
5
Lefkotheo Indoor Hall, Court 2
1 November 2024, 14:30

Liechtenstein
0

			1	2	3
1	(Iceland) (Liechtenstein)	Einar Oli Gudbjornsson; Sebastian Schwald	21; 12	21; 11
2	(Iceland) (Liechtenstein)	Lilja Bu; Chanisa Wariwong	21; 12	21; 10
3	(Iceland) (Liechtenstein)	Davíð Bjarni Björnsson / Kristófer Darri Finnsson; Mirco Lareida / Stanley Wee	21; 3	21; 12
4	(Iceland) (Liechtenstein)	Drífa Harðardóttir / Arna Karen Jóhannsdóttir; Chow Jing You / Chanisa Wariwong	21; 3	21; 5
5	(Iceland) (Liechtenstein)	Kristófer Darri Finnsson / Una Hrund Örvar; Soh Sin Siang / Oh Ying San	21; 7	21; 10

==== Iceland vs. Faroe Islands ====
Iceland
4
Lefkotheo Indoor Hall, Court 3
2 November 2024, 10:00

Faroe Islands
1

			1	2	3
1	(Iceland) (Faroe Islands)	Davíð Bjarni Björnsson / Arna Karen Jóhannsdóttir; Rúni Øster / Mia Thorkildshøj	21; 12	21; 16
2	(Iceland) (Faroe Islands)	Lilja Bu; Miriam í Grótinum	9; 21	21; 18	10; 21
3	(Iceland) (Faroe Islands)	Róbert Ingi Huldarsson; Christian Berg Petersen	21; 13	21; 12
4	(Iceland) (Faroe Islands)	Drífa Harðardóttir / Arna Karen Jóhannsdóttir; Miriam í Grótinum / Bjarnhild Justinussen	21; 12	21; 19
5	(Iceland) (Faroe Islands)	Davíð Bjarni Björnsson / Kristófer Darri Finnsson; Magnus Dal-Christiansen / Rúni Øster	21; 3	21; 14

=== Group B ===
Pos	Team	Pld	W	L	MF	MA	MD	GF	GA	GD	PF	PA	PD	Pts	Qualification
1	Cyprus (H)	2	2	0	10	0	+10	20	1	+19	438	185	+253	2	1st–3rd place
2	Gibraltar	2	1	1	4	6	−2	9	13	−4	329	401	−72	1	4th–6th place
3	Monaco	2	0	2	1	9	−8	3	18	−15	240	421	−181	0	7th–9th place

Source: TS
(H) Host

==== Gibraltar vs. Monaco ====
Gibraltar
4
Lefkotheo Indoor Hall, Court 2
1 November 2024, 10:00

Monaco
1

			1	2	3
1	(Gibraltar) (Monaco)	Kasper Thy Jessen / Alison Jessen; Arnaud Cotta / Lelia Dumoulin	21; 7	21; 13
2	(Gibraltar) (Monaco)	Thomas Reidy; Antony Ganachau	17; 21	7; 21
3	(Gibraltar) (Monaco)	Alison Jessen; Thien Tran	21; 14	21; 14
4	(Gibraltar) (Monaco)	Kasper Thy Jessen / James Linares; Arnaud Cotta / Antony Ganachau	21; 14	21; 13
5	(Gibraltar) (Monaco)	Chantal De'Ath / Amber Prescott; Lelia Dumoulin / Thien Tran	21; 18	19; 21	21; 17

==== Cyprus vs. Monaco ====
Cyprus
5
Lefkotheo Indoor Hall, Court 3
1 November 2024, 14:30

Monaco
0

			1	2	3
1	(Cyprus) (Monaco)	Konstantinos Giannopoulos / Eleni Charalambous; Antony Ganachau / Thien Tran	21; 12	21; 7
2	(Cyprus) (Monaco)	Elias Nicolaou; Arnaud Cotta	21; 4	21; 4
3	(Cyprus) (Monaco)	Sofia Ioannou; Lelia Dumoulin	21; 3	21; 2
4	(Cyprus) (Monaco)	Iakovos Acheriotis / Andreas Ioannou; Arnaud Cotta / David Giard	21; 9	21; 9
5	(Cyprus) (Monaco)	Varvara Architektonidou / Efi Zanou; Lelia Dumoulin / Thien Tran	21; 7	21; 10

==== Cyprus vs. Gibraltar ====
Cyprus
5
Lefkotheo Indoor Hall, Court 2
2 November 2024, 10:00

Gibraltar
0

			1	2	3
1	(Cyprus) (Gibraltar)	Konstantinos Giannopoulos / Eleni Charalambous; Kasper Thy Jessen / Alison Jessen	21; 14	21; 14
2	(Cyprus) (Gibraltar)	Elias Nicolaou; Joshua Montado	21; 4	21; 6
3	(Cyprus) (Gibraltar)	Varvara Architektonidou; Amber Prescott	21; 8	21; 6
4	(Cyprus) (Gibraltar)	Christos Georgiou / Evelthon Hadjipantelis; James Linares / Thomas Reidy	21; 18	18; 21	21; 12
5	(Cyprus) (Gibraltar)	Chara Michael / Ioanna Pissi; Chantal De'Ath / Alison Jessen	21; 9	21; 6

=== Group C ===
Pos	Team	Pld	W	L	MF	MA	MD	GF	GA	GD	PF	PA	PD	Pts	Qualification
1	Greenland	2	2	0	7	3	+4	15	8	+7	433	409	+24	2	1st–3rd place
2	Malta	2	1	1	5	5	0	11	10	+1	397	365	+32	1	4th–6th place
3	Isle of Man	2	0	2	3	7	−4	7	15	−8	382	438	−56	0	7th–9th place

Source: TS

==== Greenland vs. Isle of Man ====
Greenland
3
Lefkotheo Indoor Hall, Court 2
1 November 2024, 10:00

Isle of Man
2

			1	2	3
1	(Greenland) (Isle of Man)	Sebastian Bendtsen / Emilie Sørensen; Matthew Nicholson / Jessica Li	18; 21	18; 21
2	(Greenland) (Isle of Man)	Toke Ketwa-Driefer; Alexander Buck	21; 15	27; 25
3	(Greenland) (Isle of Man)	Sara Lindskov Jacobsen; Annelise Mellor	21; 15	21; 13
4	(Greenland) (Isle of Man)	Julian King / Maluk Tiger; Matthew Nicholson / Baillie Watterson	18; 21	21; 14	21; 18
5	(Greenland) (Isle of Man)	Sara Lindskov Jacobsen / Tina Rafaelsen; Leah Brennan / Jessica Li	12; 21	21; 11	15; 21

==== Malta vs. Isle of Man ====
Malta
4
Lefkotheo Indoor Hall, Court 1
1 November 2024, 14:30

Isle of Man
1

			1	2	3
1	(Malta) (Isle of Man)	Samuel Cassar / Francesca Clark; Matthew Nicholson / Jessica Li	21; 17	21; 19
2	(Malta) (Isle of Man)	Matthew Abela; Alexander Buck	21; 14	21; 12
3	(Malta) (Isle of Man)	Elenia Haber; Annelise Mellor	24; 22	21; 18
4	(Malta) (Isle of Man)	Matthew Abela / Nigel DeGaetano; Matthew Nicholson / Baillie Watterson	21; 13	21; 9
5	(Malta) (Isle of Man)	Francesca Clark / Martina Clark; Leah Brennan / Jessica Li	17; 21	16; 21

==== Malta vs. Greenland ====
Malta
1
Lefkotheo Indoor Hall, Court 3
2 November 2024, 10:00

Greenland
4

			1	2	3
1	(Malta) (Greenland)	Samuel Cassar / Francesca Clark; Maluk Tiger / Tina Rafaelsen	18; 21	14; 21
2	(Malta) (Greenland)	Matthew Abela; Julian King	21; 11	21; 5
3	(Malta) (Greenland)	Elenia Haber; Sara Lindskov Jacobsen	9; 21	15; 21
4	(Malta) (Greenland)	Matthew Abela / Matthew Galea; Toke Ketwa-Driefer / Maluk Tiger	17; 21	19; 21
5	(Malta) (Greenland)	Lauren Azzopardi / Francesca Clark; Sara Lindskov Jacobsen / Tina Rafaelsen	21; 12	22; 24	16; 21

== Classification round ==
=== 7th–9th place ===
Pos	Team	Pld	W	L	MF	MA	MD	GF	GA	GD	PF	PA	PD	Pts	Qualification
1	Isle of Man	2	2	0	10	0	+10	20	0	+20	425	203	+222	2	7th place
2	Liechtenstein	2	1	1	4	6	−2	8	12	−4	336	356	−20	1	8th place
3	Monaco	2	0	2	1	9	−8	2	18	−16	215	417	−202	0	9th place

Source: TS

==== Liechtenstein vs. Monaco ====
Liechtenstein
4
Lefkotheo Indoor Hall, Court 3
2 November 2024, 14:30

Monaco
1

			1	2	3
1	(Liechtenstein) (Monaco)	Oh Ying San; Thien Tran	20; 22	19; 21
2	(Liechtenstein) (Monaco)	Mirco Lareida; Antony Ganachau	21; 6	21; 13
3	(Liechtenstein) (Monaco)	Oh Ying San / Chanisa Wariwong; Lelia Dumoulin / Thien Tran	21; 19	21; 16
4	(Liechtenstein) (Monaco)	Sebastian Schwald / Soh Sin Siang; Arnaud Cotta / Antony Ganachau	21; 10	21; 11
5	(Liechtenstein) (Monaco)	Mirco Lareida / Chanisa Wariwong; David Giard / Lelia Dumoulin	21; 12	21; 11

==== Monaco vs. Isle of Man ====
Monaco
0
Lefkotheo Indoor Hall, Court 3
3 November 2024, 09:00

Isle of Man
5

			1	2	3
1	(Monaco) (Isle of Man)	David Giard / Thien Tran; Alexander Buck / Leah Brennan	10; 21	8; 21
2	(Monaco) (Isle of Man)	Lelia Dumoulin; Annelise Mellor	7; 21	5; 21
3	(Monaco) (Isle of Man)	Arnaud Cotta; Alexander Buck	7; 21	10; 21
4	(Monaco) (Isle of Man)	Lelia Dumoulin / Thien Tran; Leah Brennan / Jessica Li	4; 21	7; 21
5	(Monaco) (Isle of Man)	Antony Ganachau / David Giard; Matthew Nicholson / Baillie Watterson	7; 21	9; 21

==== Liechtenstein vs. Isle of Man ====
Liechtenstein
0
Lefkotheo Indoor Hall, Court 3
3 November 2024, 12:00

Isle of Man
5

			1	2	3
1	(Liechtenstein) (Isle of Man)	Mirco Lareida; Alexander Buck	18; 21	24; 26
2	(Liechtenstein) (Isle of Man)	Chanisa Wariwong; Annelise Mellor	6; 21	9; 21
3	(Liechtenstein) (Isle of Man)	Sebastian Schwald / Stanley Wee; Matthew Nicholson / Baillie Watterson	14; 21	11; 21
4	(Liechtenstein) (Isle of Man)	Oh Ying San / Chanisa Wariwong; Jessica Li / Annelise Mellor	14; 21	2; 21
5	(Liechtenstein) (Isle of Man)	Soh Sin Siang / Oh Ying San; Baillie Watterson / Leah Brennan	17; 21	14; 21

=== 4th–6th place ===
Pos	Team	Pld	W	L	MF	MA	MD	GF	GA	GD	PF	PA	PD	Pts	Qualification
1	Faroe Islands	2	2	0	8	2	+6	16	4	+12	404	276	+128	2	4th place
2	Malta	2	1	1	7	3	+4	14	7	+7	406	334	+72	1	5th place
3	Gibraltar	2	0	2	0	10	−10	1	20	−19	237	437	−200	0	6th place

Source: TS

==== Faroe Islands vs. Gibraltar ====
Faroe Islands
4
Lefkotheo Indoor Hall, Court 2
2 November 2024, 14:30

Gibraltar
1

			1	2	3
1	(Faroe Islands) (Gibraltar)	Christian Berg Petersen; Kasper Thy Jessen	21; 11	21; 19
2	(Faroe Islands) (Gibraltar)	Mia Thorkildshøj; Chantal De'Ath	21; 6	21; 10
3	(Faroe Islands) (Gibraltar)	Árant á Mýrini / Jónas Djurhuus; Joshua Montado / Thomas Reidy	21; 9	21; 8
4	(Faroe Islands) (Gibraltar)	Lena Maria Joensen / Bjarnhild Justinussen; Chantal De'Ath / Amber Prescott	21; 7	21; 6
5	(Faroe Islands) (Gibraltar)	Magnus Dal-Christiansen / Sanna Thorkildshøj; James Linares / Alison Jessen	21; 10	21; 11

==== Gibraltar vs. Malta ====
Gibraltar
0
Lefkotheo Indoor Hall, Court 2
3 November 2024, 09:00

Malta
5

			1	2	3
1	(Gibraltar) (Malta)	Joshua Montado; Samuel Cassar	10; 21	17; 21
2	(Gibraltar) (Malta)	Alison Jessen; Elenia Haber	15; 21	4; 21
3	(Gibraltar) (Malta)	Kasper Thy Jessen / James Linares; Matthew Abela / Matthew Galea	12; 21	21; 16	20; 22
4	(Gibraltar) (Malta)	Chantal De'Ath / Amber Prescott; Francesca Clark / Martina Clark	8; 21	7; 21
5	(Gibraltar) (Malta)	Thomas Reidy / Alison Jessen; Nigel DeGaetano / Lauren Azzopardi	14; 21	12; 21

==== Faroe Islands vs. Malta ====
Faroe Islands
3
Lefkotheo Indoor Hall, Court 3
3 November 2024, 12:00

Malta
2

			1	2	3
1	(Faroe Islands) (Malta)	Magnus Dal-Christiansen / Mia Thorkildshøj; Samuel Cassar / Francesca Clark	21; 17	21; 14
2	(Faroe Islands) (Malta)	Rúni Øster; Matthew Abela	19; 21	13; 21
3	(Faroe Islands) (Malta)	Sanna Thorkildshøj; Elenia Haber	21; 16	21; 18
4	(Faroe Islands) (Malta)	Árant á Mýrini / Jónas Djurhuus; Matthew Abela / Matthew Galea	17; 21	19; 21
5	(Faroe Islands) (Malta)	Lena Maria Joensen / Bjarnhild Justinussen; Lauren Azzopardi / Francesca Clark	21; 15	21; 15

== Final round ==
=== 1st–3rd place ===
Pos	Team	Pld	W	L	MF	MA	MD	GF	GA	GD	PF	PA	PD	Pts	Qualification
1	Iceland	2	2	0	7	3	+4	14	7	+7	404	316	+88	2	Champions
2	Greenland	2	1	1	4	6	−2	9	13	−4	330	402	−72	1	Runners-up
3	Cyprus (H)	2	0	2	4	6	−2	9	12	−3	371	387	−16	0	Third place

Source: TS
(H) Host

==== Iceland vs. Cyprus ====
Iceland
3
Lefkotheo Indoor Hall, Court 1
2 November 2024, 14:30

Cyprus
2

			1	2	3
1	(Iceland) (Cyprus)	Davíð Bjarni Björnsson / Arna Karen Jóhannsdóttir; Ioannis Tambourlas / Ioanna Pissi	21; 13	21; 17
2	(Iceland) (Cyprus)	Róbert Ingi Huldarsson; Nikolas Kokosis	16; 21	20; 22
3	(Iceland) (Cyprus)	Lilja Bu; Sofia Ioannou	24; 26	18; 21
4	(Iceland) (Cyprus)	Davíð Bjarni Björnsson / Kristófer Darri Finnsson; Iakovos Acheriotis / Ioannis Tambourlas	21; 13	21; 6
5	(Iceland) (Cyprus)	Drífa Harðardóttir / Arna Karen Jóhannsdóttir; Chara Michael / Ioanna Pissi	21; 14	21; 16

==== Cyprus vs. Greenland ====
Cyprus
2
Lefkotheo Indoor Hall, Court 1
3 November 2024, 09:00

Greenland
3

			1	2	3
1	(Cyprus) (Greenland)	Ioannis Tambourlas / Ioanna Pissi; Maluk Tiger / Tina Rafaelsen	18; 21	21; 12	14; 21
2	(Cyprus) (Greenland)	Nikolas Kokosis; Samuel Cassar	21; 11	21; 17
3	(Cyprus) (Greenland)	Sofia Ioannou; Sara Lindskov Jacobsen	16; 21	15; 21
4	(Cyprus) (Greenland)	Konstantinos Giannopoulos / Ioannis Tambourlas; Toke Ketwa-Driefer / Maluk Tiger	19; 21	15; 21
5	(Cyprus) (Greenland)	Chara Michael / Ioanna Pissi; Sara Lindskov Jacobsen / Tina Rafaelsen	21; 17			retired

==== Iceland vs. Greenland ====
Iceland
4
Lefkotheo Indoor Hall, Court 1
3 November 2024, 12:00

Greenland
1

			1	2	3
1	(Iceland) (Greenland)	Davíð Bjarni Björnsson / Arna Karen Jóhannsdóttir; Maluk Tiger / Tina Rafaelsen	21; 15	21; 13
2	(Iceland) (Greenland)	Róbert Ingi Huldarsson; Toke Ketwa-Driefer	21; 12	12; 21	21; 16
3	(Iceland) (Greenland)	Lilja Bu; Sara Lindskov Jacobsen	13; 21	9; 21
4	(Iceland) (Greenland)	Davíð Bjarni Björnsson / Kristófer Darri Finnsson; Sebastian Bendtsen / Julian King	21; 12	21; 7
5	(Iceland) (Greenland)	Drífa Harðardóttir / Arna Karen Jóhannsdóttir; Cecilia Josenius / Emilie Sørensen	21; 3	21; 6

== Final ranking ==
Pos	Team	Pld	W	L	Pts	MD	GD	PD	Final result
1st place, gold medalist(s)	Iceland	4	4	0	4	+12	+24	+260	Champions
2nd place, silver medalist(s)	Greenland	4	3	1	3	+2	+4	−27	Runners-up
3rd place, bronze medalist(s)	Cyprus	4	2	2	2	+8	+15	+216	Third place
4	Faroe Islands	4	3	1	3	+8	+15	+193	Fourth place
5	Malta	4	2	2	2	+4	+8	+104	5th place
6	Gibraltar	4	1	3	1	−12	−23	−272	6th place
7	Isle of Man	4	2	2	2	+6	+12	+166	7th place
8	Liechtenstein	4	1	3	1	−12	−24	−257	8th place
9	Monaco	4	0	4	0	−16	−29	−383	9th place
