= Mary Thompson (badminton) =

Scottish international badminton player

Personal information
- Nationality: British (Scottish)
- Born: 11 November 1944 (age 81)

Sport
- Sport: Badminton
- Club: Glasgow BC
Medal record
Representing Scotland
Irish Open
Gold medal – first place	1968	mixed doubles

Mary Thompson is a former international badminton player from Scotland who competed at the 1970 Commonwealth Games.

== Biography ==
Thompson played her badminton in Glasgow and specialised in doubles.

She was a Scottish international, representing them in world tournaments including the Uber Cup. In November 1969 she was selected for the Scottish Commonwealth Games trials. Thompson subsequently represented the Scottish team at the 1970 British Commonwealth Games in Edinburgh, Scotland, competing in the women's singles event and the women's doubles.
