= Hiroe Amano =

Japanese badminton player (born 1943)

Personal information
- Born: 6 November 1943 (age 83) Gifu Prefecture, Japan

Sport
- Country: Japan
- Sport: Badminton
Medal record
Women's badminton
Representing Japan
Uber Cup
Gold medal – first place	1966 Wellington	Women's team
Gold medal – first place	1969 Tokyo	Women's team
Asian Games
Gold medal – first place	1966 Bangkok	Women's team
Silver medal – second place	1966 Bangkok	Women's doubles

Hiroe Amano (天野博江, Hiroe Amano; born 6 November 1943) is a former badminton player of Japan.

Amano won several international and national titles in the 1960s. She was among the most notable of a cadre of fine players who helped Japan to win the Uber Cup (women's world team) competitions in 1966 and in 1969. In 1978 she was the coach of the successful Japanese Uber Cup team.

== Early life and education ==
Amano began playing badminton after enrolling at Kakegawa Nishi High School in Shizuoka Prefecture, where she partnered in girls' doubles with her classmate Noriko Takagi. They placed third in girls' doubles at the 1961 National High School Championships (Inter-High). Following her high school graduation in 1962, Amano attended the Japan Women's College of Physical Education, where she trained under coach Hajime Imai. She graduated with a degree in physical education in 1964. Amano has since cited her high school experiences as foundational to her athletic career.

== Awards and nominations ==
Award	Year	Category	Result	Ref.
Asahi Sports Award	1966	Victory at the 1966 Uber Cup with the Japanese women's national team	Won	
Asahi Sports Award	1969	Victory at the 1969 Uber Cup with the Japanese women's national team	Won	
Order of the Sacred Treasure, Gold Rays with Rosette	2023	Contributions to sports promotion and educational research	Won	

== Achievements ==
=== Asian Games ===
Women's doubles
Year	Venue	Partner	Opponent	Score	Result
1966	Kittikachorn Stadium; Bangkok, Thailand	(Japan) Tomoko Takahashi	(Indonesia) Minarni (Indonesia) Retno Kustijah	9–15, 6–15	Silver

=== International tournaments ===
Women's doubles
Year	Tournament	Partner	Opponent	Score	Result
1967	Singapore Open	(Japan) Noriko Takagi	(Indonesia) Minarni (Indonesia) Retno Kustijah	6–15, 13–18	(silver) Runner-up
1967	Denmark Open	(Japan) Noriko Takagi	(Netherlands) Imre Rietveld (Denmark) Ulla Strand	15–12, 9–15, 15–8	(gold) Winner
1968	All England Open	(Japan) Noriko Takagi	(Indonesia) Minarni (Indonesia) Retno Kustijah	5–15, 6–15	(silver) Runner-up
1968	Denmark Open	(Japan) Noriko Takagi	(Denmark) Karin Jørgensen (Denmark) Ulla Strand	15–11, 15–11	(gold) Winner
1969	All England Open	(Japan) Tomoko Takahashi	(England) Margaret Boxall (England) Susan Whetnall	11–15, 11–15	(silver) Runner-up
1969	Denmark Open	(Japan) Tomoko Takahashi	(Japan) Hiroe Yuki (Japan) Noriko Takagi	9–15, 9–15	(silver) Runner-up
1970	Denmark Open	(Japan) Noriko Takagi	(Japan) Machiko Aizawa (Japan) Etsuko Takenaka	17–15, 12–15, 9–15	(silver) Runner-up
