= Noriko Nakayama =

Japanese badminton player

Personal information
- Born: Noriko Takagi 高木 紀子; 30 May 1943 (age 83) Kakegawa, Shizuoka, Japan
- Height: 1.66 m (5 ft 5 in)

Sport
- Country: Japan
- Sport: Badminton
- Handedness: Right
- Event: Women's singles and doubles
Medal record
Women's badminton
Representing Japan
Uber Cup
Gold medal – first place	1966 Wellington	Women's team
Gold medal – first place	1969 Tokyo	Women's team
Gold medal – first place	1972 Tokyo	Women's team
Silver medal – second place	1975 Jakarta	Women's team
Gold medal – first place	1978 Auckland	Women's team
Asian Games
Gold medal – first place	1966 Bangkok	Women's singles
Gold medal – first place	1966 Bangkok	Women's team
Bronze medal – third place	1966 Bangkok	Women's doubles

Noriko Nakayama (中山 紀子, Nakayama Noriko; née Takagi; born 30 May 1943) is a Japanese former badminton player, the first true international badminton star from that nation, who won numerous Japanese national and major international titles from the mid-1960s to the early 1970s.

Nakayama claimed seven of these at the Danish Open, two in singles and five in women's doubles. She was the champion at World Invitational Championships held in Glasgow, in 1969 in Women's doubles category with Hiroe Amano. At the prestigious All-England Championships she shared the women's doubles title with her compatriot and singles rival Hiroe Yuki in 1971, and won the singles title over Yuki in 1972, having previously lost twice in the finals. She also won the women's singles event at the Olympic Games Demonstration in 1972. In four successive Uber Cup (women's international team) competitions, between 1965 and 1975 she was unbeaten in singles, thus leading the way to three world team titles for Japan. With the birth of her eldest daughter, she hung her racket in 1975. As of 2017, she is still actively associated with the sport, coaching at the local level.

Takagi holding the 1969 Uber Cup as captain of the Japanese team.

== Honours and awards ==
- Asahi: Sports Award with the Uber Cup team (1966).
- Asahi: Sports Award with the Uber Cup team (1969).

== Achievements ==
=== Olympic Games (demonstration) ===
Women's singles
Year	Venue	Opponent	Score	Result
1972	Volleyballhalle, Munich, West Germany	(Indonesia) Utami Dewi	11–5, 11–3	Gold

=== Asian Games ===
Women's singles
Year	Venue	Opponent	Score	Result
1966	Kittikachorn Stadium, Bangkok, Thailand	(Thailand) Sumol Chanklum	11–0, 11–4	Gold

Women's doubles
Year	Venue	Partner	Opponent	Score	Result
1966	Kittikachorn Stadium, Bangkok, Thailand	(Japan) Kazuko Goto	(Indonesia) Retno Kustijah (Indonesia) Minarni	5–15, 11–15	Bronze

=== International tournaments ===
Women's singles
Year	Tournament	Opponent	Score	Result
1967	All England Open	(United States) Judy Hashman	11–5, 8–11, 10–12	(silver) Runner-up
1967	Denmark Open	(Netherlands) Imre Rietveld	11–5, 11–3	(gold) Winner
1968	Singapore Open	(Japan) Hiroe Yuki	11–7, 10–12, 11–4	(gold) Winner
1968	Denmark Open	(Sweden) Eva Twedberg	9–12, 12–9, 10–12	(silver) Runner-up
1969	All England Open	(Japan) Hiroe Yuki	5–11, 5–11	(silver) Runner-up
1969	Denmark Open	(Japan) Hiroe Yuki	10–12, 2–11	(silver) Runner-up
1971	U. S. Open	(Japan) Hiroe Yuki	11–5, 11–9	(gold) Winner
1971	Canadian Open	(Japan) Hiroe Yuki	9–12, 0–11	(silver) Runner-up
1971	Denmark Open	(Japan) Hiroe Yuki	11–7, 11–7	(gold) Winner
1972	All England Open	(Japan) Hiroe Yuki	11–5, 3–11, 11–7	(gold) Winner
1972	Denmark Open	(Sweden) Eva Twedberg	4–11, 6–11	(silver) Runner-up

Women's doubles
Year	Tournament	Partner	Opponent	Score	Result
1967	Singapore Open	(Japan) Hiroe Amano	(Indonesia) Minarni (Indonesia) Retno Kustijah	6–15, 13–18	(silver) Runner-up
1967	Denmark Open	(Japan) Hiroe Amano	(Netherlands) Imre Rietveld (Denmark) Ulla Strand	15–12, 9–15, 15–8	(gold) Winner
1968	All England Open	(Japan) Hiroe Amano	(Indonesia) Minarni (Indonesia) Retno Kustijah	5–15, 6–15	(silver) Runner-up
1968	Malaysia Open	(Japan) Hiroe Yuki	(Japan) Machiko Aizawa (Japan) Etsuko Takenaka	11–15, 10–15	(silver) Runner-up
1968	Singapore Open	(Japan) Hiroe Yuki	(Malaysia) Rosalind Singha Ang (Sweden) Eva Twedberg	15–6, 15–11	(gold) Winner
1968	Denmark Open	(Japan) Hiroe Amano	(Denmark) Karin Jørgensen (Denmark) Ulla Strand	15–11, 15–11	(gold) Winner
1969	Denmark Open	(Japan) Hiroe Yuki	(Japan) Hiroe Amano (Japan) Tomoko Takahashi	15–9, 15–9	(gold) Winner
1970	Denmark Open	(Japan) Hiroe Amano	(Japan) Machiko Aizawa (Japan) Etsuko Takenaka	17–15, 12–15, 9–15	(silver) Runner-up
1971	All England Open	(Japan) Hiroe Yuki	(England) Gillian Gilks (United States) Judy Hashman	15–10, 18–13	(gold) Winner
1971	U. S. Open	(Japan) Hiroe Yuki	(United States) Ethel Marshall (United States) Dorothy O'Neil	15–8, 15–2	(gold) Winner
1971	Canadian Open	(Japan) Hiroe Yuki	(Japan) Machiko Aizawa (Japan) Etsuko Takenaka	Walkover	(gold) Winner
1971	Denmark Open	(Japan) Hiroe Yuki	(Japan) Machiko Aizawa (Japan) Etsuko Takenaka	15–10, 15–3	(gold) Winner
1972	Denmark Open	(Japan) Hiroe Yuki	(Japan) Machiko Aizawa (Japan) Etsuko Takenaka	15–11, 11–15, 17–15	(gold) Winner

Mixed doubles
Year	Tournament	Partner	Opponent	Score	Result
1968	Singapore Open	(Denmark) Svend Andersen	(Thailand) Sangob Rattanusorn (Thailand) Pachara Pattabongse	15–8, 15–11	(gold) Winner
