= Maureen Mockford =

Badminton player and bowler

Maureen Mockford née Perry
- All Ireland Winner in 1970

Personal information
- Nationality: British (Northern Irish)
- Born: Maureen Phyllis Perry; 27 March 1942 Belfast, Northern Ireland
- Died: 12 January 2008 (aged 65) Belfast, Northern Ireland

Sport
- Sport: Badminton
- Handedness: Left
Medal record
Representing Northern Ireland
Irish Nationals
| Gold medal – first place | 1970 | singles |

Maureen Mockford (27 March 1942 – 12 January 2008) was an international badminton player from Northern Ireland who competed at the Commonwealth Games and was a singles champion of Ireland.

== Biography ==
Mockford was born Maureen Phyllis Perry, to Phyllis and George Perry MBE on 27 March 1942. George, from Renfrew in Glasgow, played football for Belfast Celtic and was part of the 1925/26 quadruple winning team. He worked as the assistant manager in the electrical department at Harland and Wolff and received an MBE in the 1958 New Years Honours for services to shipbuilding. He met Phyllis who was a draughts woman at Harland and Wolff. Pam Porter was her doubles partner throughout her early playing days at Belfast High School and Malone Badminton club. In the late '60s and early '70s Malone dominated the Ulster and Irish badminton scene with players like Maureen, Pam, Maurice Adamson, Derek Porter, Joan Simpson, Adrian Bell, Colin Bell and Robert Bruce, all representing the club at National and International level. Maureen married Anthony James Mockford in 1966.

Mockford won her first Irish cap during the 1961/62 season. In 1970 she won the singles at the Irish National Badminton Championships,

Mockford represented the Northern Irish team at the 1970 British Commonwealth Games in Edinburgh, Scotland, where she competed in the singles, women's doubles and mixed doubles events. She partnered Joan McCloy in the women's doubles.

Mockford played on the Irish national badminton team 18 times between 1961 and 1970. She later took up bowling, competing in Irish trials. She died on 12 January 2008 due to complications from acute myeloid leukaemia.

== Achievements ==
| Year | Tournament | Event | Place |
|---|---|---|---|
| 1970 | Irish National Badminton Championships | Women's singles | winner |
| 1970 | British Commonwealth Games | Women's singles | 17 |
