= Damayanti Tambay =

Indian badminton player

- Occupation: Badminton Player
- Known for: Wife of Vijay Vasant Tambay; Former Badminton Player
- Spouse: Vijay Vasant Tambay

Damayanti Tambay is an Indian former badminton player and the wife of Flt lt V. V. Tambay (one of the missing 54 Indian defence personnel from the 1971 Indo-Pak war who are believed to be in Pakistani custody).

== Biography ==
During the 1971 Indo-Pak war, on 5 December 1971, Tambay's husband Vijay Vasant Tambay, Flight Lieutenant of Indian Airforce was captured as the enemy by Pakistan Army. Consequently, Tambay had taken several initiatives to bring back her husband along with the other 46 war prisoners, but was not successful and the official standpoint of Indian Army was that all the missing personnel died. By 1971, Damayanti Tambay had won three consecutive National women's singles. But she announced her retirement in 1971, at the age of 23 after her husband got captured in the missing 54 incident of 1971 Indo-Pak war taking the vow that she would not resume her career in badminton unless she gets her husband back or receives the confirmed news that her husband was dead.

She later became a leading member of the Missing defence personnel association. She is currently serving as the deputy director of physical education at Jawaharlal Nehru University.

== In popular culture ==
=== Film ===
A short film on 1971 Indo-Pak War featuring Damayanti Tambay was directed by Akanksha Damini Joshi. The short film directed by Joshi in 2005 for Janmat voices the concern and hope of Damayanti Tambay who has awaited the return of her husband for nearly five decades.

== Notes ==
- Koul, M. G. (. P. (2014). The Silence Speaks. United Kingdom: Partridge Publishing India.
- Chatterji, S. A. (2015). Filming Reality: The Independent Documentary Movement in India. India: SAGE Publications.
