= 1978 Uber Cup =

1978 Uber Cup 1978 Uber Kapu
Tournament details
- Dates: 13 – 20 May 1978
- Edition: 8th
- Level: International
- Nations: 6
- Venue: Auckland Badminton Association Hall
- Location: Auckland, New Zealand

The 1978 Uber Cup (Māori: 1978 Uber Kapu whakataetae pūkura tiima wahine) was the eighth edition of the Uber Cup, the women's badminton team competition. The tournament took place in the 1977-78 badminton season, 15 countries competed. Japan won its fourth title in the Uber Cup, after beating Indonesia in the Final Round in Auckland.

== Qualification ==
15 teams from 4 regions took part in the competition. As defending champions, Indonesia skipped the qualifications and played directly in the second round of the inter-zone ties (team matches), effectively the semi-finals of the tournament. New Zealand qualified for the final tournament as host nation.

Means of qualification	Date	Venue	Slot	Qualified teams
Host country	October 1977	Auckland	1	New Zealand
1975 Uber Cup	31 May – 6 June 1975	Jakarta	1	Indonesia
Asian Zone	23 October 1977 – 8 April 1978	Kuala Lumpur; Tokyo	1	Japan
American Zone	19–20 November 1977	San Diego	1	United States
European Zone	2 November 1977 – 30 March 1978	Brae; Copenhagen; Edinburgh; Haarlem; Perth; Tilburg; Washington	1	Denmark
Australasian Zone	–	–	1	Australia
Total			6	

From the qualifying rounds, four countries progressed to the inter-zone ties. From the Asian zone, Japan beat Malaysia 4–3. In the European zone final, Denmark defeated England 5–2. From the Pan American zone, the United States advanced to the inter-zone ties after defeating the Republic of China 7–0. Australia qualified for the final tournament as the only Australasian Zone representative.

== Knockout stage ==
The following four teams, shown by region, qualified for the 1978 Uber Cup. In the first round, Japan defeated Australia 7–0 while the United States defeated hosts New Zealand 7–0. In the second round, defending champions Indonesia beat the United States 7–0 while Japan defeated Denmark 6–1.

Indonesia clashed with Japan for a fourth consecutive time in the final. 7 matches were played: 3 singles and 4 doubles (2 doubles, then reversed). Japan won the Uber Cup once again by defeating Indonesia 5–2 in the final.

=== Bracket ===
First round
Indonesia
Bye
13 May 1978 – Auckland
New Zealand	0
United States	7
14 May 1978 – Auckland
Australia	0
Japan	7
Bye
Denmark

Second round
16 May 1978 – Auckland
Indonesia	7
United States	0
17 May 1978 – Auckland
Japan	6
Denmark	1

Challenge round
20 May 1978 – Auckland
Indonesia	2
Japan	5

=== First round ===
13 May 1978

United States	7–0	New Zealand
Report

Auckland Badminton Association Hall, New Zealand

14 May 1978

Japan	7–0	Australia
Report

Auckland Badminton Association Hall, New Zealand

=== Second round ===
16 May 1978

Indonesia	7–0	United States
Report

Auckland Badminton Association Hall, New Zealand

17 May 1978

Japan	6–1	Denmark
Report

Auckland Badminton Association Hall, New Zealand

=== Challenge round ===
20 May 1978

Indonesia	2–5	Japan
Report

Auckland Badminton Association Hall, New Zealand

1978 Uber Cup winner

Japan
Fourth title
