= 1969 Uber Cup =

1969 Uber Cup ユーバー杯1969
Tournament details
- Dates: 8 – 14 June 1969
- Edition: 5th
- Level: International
- Nations: 5
- Venue: Tokyo Metropolitan Gymnasium
- Location: Tokyo, Japan

The 1969 Uber Cup was the fifth edition of the Uber Cup, the women's badminton team competition. The tournament took place in the 1968-1969 badminton season, 18 countries competed. Japan won its second title in the Uber Cup, after beating the Indonesia team in the Final Round in Tokyo, Japan.

== Qualification ==
18 teams from 4 regions took part in the competition. As defending champion, Japan skipped the qualifications and played directly in the final round of the inter-zone ties (team matches), effectively the semifinals of the tournament. Four teams qualified for the interzone stage of the competition, Indonesia, Thailand, England and the United States. Japan were exempted until the challenge round.

Means of qualification	Date	Venue	Slot	Qualified teams
1966 Uber Cup	14 – 21 May 1966	Auckland; Dunedin; Napier; Wellington	1	Japan
Asian Zone	30 January – 1 February 1969	Bangkok	1	Thailand
American Zone	3 March 1969	Wilmington	1	United States
European Zone	21 November 1968 – 28 February 1969	Copenhagen; Dresden; Dublin; Dunfermline; Edinburgh; Hamburg; Stoke	1	England
Australasian Zone	7 – 21 September 1968	Masterton; Perth	1	Indonesia
Total			5	

From the Australasian zone, Indonesia advanced to the next round after beating Australia 7–0. From the Asian zone the Thailand team beat South Korea 5–2. In the European zone final England defeated East Germany 6–1. From the Pan American zone, United States advanced to the inter-zone ties after beating Canada 5-2 and getting a walkover from Peru.

== Knockout stage ==
The following four teams, shown by region, qualified for the 1969 Uber Cup. In the first round, England defeated Thailand 7–0 while Indonesia defeated the United States 7–0. Indonesia entered the Uber Cup final for the first time after the team defeated England 4–3 in the second round. Indonesia were set to meet defending champions and hosts Japan in the final. 7 matches were played: 3 singles and 4 doubles (2 doubles, then reversed). Japan retained the title after defeating Indonesia 6–1 in the final.

=== Bracket ===
First round
Japan
Bye
8 June 1969 – Tokyo
England	7
Thailand	0
8 June 1969 – Tokyo
Indonesia	7
United States	0

Second round
Japan
Bye
11 June 1969 – Tokyo
England	3
Indonesia	4

Challenge round
14 June 1966 – Tokyo
Japan	6
Indonesia	1

=== First round ===
8 June 1969

United States	0–7	Indonesia
Report

Tokyo Metropolitan Gymnasium, Japan

8 June 1969

England	7–0	Thailand
Report

Tokyo Metropolitan Gymnasium, Japan

=== Second round ===
11 June 1969

England	3–4	Indonesia
Report

Tokyo Metropolitan Gymnasium, Japan

=== Challenge round ===
14 June 1969

Japan	6–1	Indonesia
Report

Tokyo Metropolitan Gymnasium, Japan

1969 Uber Cup winner

Japan
Second title
