= 1966 Uber Cup =

1966 Uber Cup 1966 Uber Kapu
Tournament details
- Dates: 14 – 21 May 1966
- Edition: 4th
- Level: International
- Nations: 5
- Location: Napier, New Zealand; Dunedin, New Zealand; Auckland, New Zealand; Wellington, New Zealand

The 1966 Uber Cup (Māori: 1966 Uber Kapu whakataetae pūkura tiima wahine) was the fourth edition of the Uber Cup, the women's badminton team competition. The tournament took place in the 1965-66 badminton season, 17 countries competed. Japan won its first title in the Uber Cup, after beating defending champions United States in the Challenge Round.

== Qualification ==
Four teams qualified for the interzone stage of the competition, Indonesia, Japan, Canada and England. The United States were exempted until the challenge round.

Means of qualification	Date	Venue	Slot	Qualified teams
1963 Uber Cup	1 – 6 April 1963	Boston; New London; Bronxville; Wilmington	1	United States
Asian Zone	20 – 27 February 1966	Hyderabad	1	Japan
American Zone	–	–	1	Canada
European Zone	30 November 1965 – 21 March 1966	Abingdon; Belfast; Carlisle; Haarlem; Solingen	1	England
Australasian Zone	19 – 26 June 1965	Auckland; Launceston	1	Indonesia
Total			5	

== Knockout stage ==
The following four teams, shown by region, qualified for the 1966 Uber Cup. In the first round, England defeated Canada 6–1 while Indonesia suffered an upset, losing 2–5 to debutants Japan. England later met the same fate as Indonesia when the team lost 4–3 to Japan. The United States and Japan contested for the title in the final. 7 matches were played: 3 singles and 4 doubles (2 doubles, then reversed). The United States could not retain their title as the team lost 5–2 to Japan in the final. This marked Japan's first title in the Uber Cup.

=== Bracket ===
First round
United States
Bye
14 May 1966 – Napier
Japan	5
Indonesia	2
14 May 1966 – Dunedin
Canada	1
England	6

Second round
United States
Bye
17 May 1966 – Auckland
Japan	4
England	3

Challenge round
21 May 1966 – Wellington
United States	2
Japan	5

=== First round ===
14 May 1966

Indonesia	2–5	Japan
Report

Napier, New Zealand

14 May 1966

England	6–1	Canada
Report

Dunedin, New Zealand

=== Consolation playoff ===
17 May 1966

Indonesia	6–1	Canada
Report

Auckland, New Zealand

=== Second round ===
17 May 1966

England	3–4	Japan
Report

Auckland, New Zealand

=== Challenge round ===
21 May 1966

United States	2–5	Japan
Report

Wellington, New Zealand

1966 Uber Cup winner

Japan
First title
