= 2012 Balkan Badminton Championships =

Tournament details
- Dates: 4–6 May
- Venue: Mladost Hall
- Location: Burgas, Bulgaria

The 2012 Balkan Badminton Championships (Bulgarian: балканско първенство по бадминтон 2013) was a badminton tournament sanctioned by the Balkan Badminton Association and Badminton Europe. The individual and mixed team events were held from 4 to 6 May 2012.

The tournament was held at the Mladost Hall in Burgas, Bulgaria. Seven countries took part in the championships. Turkey defeated Bulgaria 3–0 in the final and won the mixed team title for the first time since the first edition of the championships in 1992. In the tie for third place, Romania defeated Moldova 3–0.

It was also the first time Turkey dominated the individual events in the championships, winning five gold medals, two silver medals and three bronze medals. North Macedonia also won their first medal in the Balkan Championships with Dea Zdravkovska and Ina Stefanovska winning bronze in the women's doubles event.

== Medal summary ==
=== Medalists ===
Event	Gold	Silver	Bronze
Men's singles	(Turkey) Emre Vural	(Bulgaria) Blagovest Kisyov	(Bulgaria) Gergin Nedyalkov
Men's singles	(Turkey) Emre Vural	(Bulgaria) Blagovest Kisyov	(Turkey) Ramazan Öztürk
Women's singles	(Turkey) Özge Bayrak	(Bulgaria) Stefani Stoeva	(Turkey) Busenur Korkmaz
Women's singles	(Turkey) Özge Bayrak	(Bulgaria) Stefani Stoeva	(Bulgaria) Mariya Mitsova
Men's doubles	(Turkey) Emre Aslan (Turkey) Hüseyin Oruç	(Turkey) Emre Lale (Turkey) Emre Vural	(Moldova) Maxim Carpenco (Moldova) Alexandru Morari
Men's doubles	(Turkey) Emre Aslan (Turkey) Hüseyin Oruç	(Turkey) Emre Lale (Turkey) Emre Vural	(Bulgaria) Julian Hristov (Bulgaria) Blagovest Kisyov
Women's doubles	(Bulgaria) Gabriela Stoeva (Bulgaria) Stefani Stoeva	(Romania) Florentina Constantinescu (Romania) Alexandra Milon	(North Macedonia) Dea Zdravkovska (North Macedonia) Ina Stefanovska
Women's doubles	(Bulgaria) Gabriela Stoeva (Bulgaria) Stefani Stoeva	(Romania) Florentina Constantinescu (Romania) Alexandra Milon	(Turkey) Neslihan Kılıç (Turkey) Ebru Tunalı
Mixed doubles	(Turkey) Hüseyin Oruç (Turkey) Ebru Tunalı	(Turkey) Ramazan Öztürk (Turkey) Neslihan Kılıç	(Bulgaria) Julian Hristov (Bulgaria) Dimitria Popstoikova
Mixed doubles	(Turkey) Hüseyin Oruç (Turkey) Ebru Tunalı	(Turkey) Ramazan Öztürk (Turkey) Neslihan Kılıç	(Bulgaria) Ivan Rusev (Bulgaria) Gabriela Stoeva
Mixed team	Turkey; Emre Aslan; Emre Lale; Hüseyin Oruç; Ramazan Öztürk; Emre Vural; Özge Bayrak; Neslihan Kılıç; Busenur Korkmaz; Ebru Tunalı; Neslihan Yiğit	Bulgaria; Julian Hristov; Blagovest Kisyov; Gergin Nedyalkov; Ivan Rusev; Petya Nedelcheva; Dimitria Popstoikova; Gabriela Stoeva; Stefani Stoeva	Romania; Robert Ciobotaru; George Constantinescu; Daniel Cojocaru; Ionut Gradinaru; Carmen Blanaru; Florentina Constantinescu; Magda Lozniceriu; Alexandra Milon

=== Medal table ===
* Host nation (Bulgaria)

Rank	Nation	Gold	Silver	Bronze	Total
1	Turkey	5	2	3	10
2	Bulgaria*	1	3	5	9
3	Romania	0	1	1	2
4	Moldova	0	0	1	1
4	North Macedonia	0	0	1	1
Totals (5 entries)		6	6	11	23

== Team event ==
=== Group stage ===
==== Group A ====
Pos	Team	Pld	W	L	MF	MA	MD	Pts	Qualification
1	Bulgaria (H)	3	3	0	14	1	+13	3	Advance to knockout stage
2	Moldova	3	2	1	9	6	+3	2	Advance to knockout stage
3	Serbia	3	1	2	7	8	−1	1	
4	North Macedonia	3	0	3	0	15	−15	0	

Source: Badminton savez Srbije
(H) Host

==== Group B ====
Pos	Team	Pld	W	L	MF	MA	MD	Pts	Qualification
1	Turkey	3	3	0	15	0	+15	3	Advance to knockout stage
2	Romania	3	2	1	9	6	+3	2	Advance to knockout stage
3	Bulgaria B (H)	3	1	2	3	12	−9	1	
4	Greece	3	0	3	2	13	−11	0	

Source: Badminton savez Srbije
(H) Host

=== Knockout stage ===
==== Bracket ====
Semi-finals
Bulgaria	3
Romania	0
Moldova	0
Turkey	3

Final
Bulgaria	0
Turkey	3
Third place
Romania	3
Moldova	0
