= 2010 Balkan Badminton Championships =

Tournament details
- Dates: 24–26 September
- Venue: Kaliakra Sports Complex
- Location: Kavarna, Bulgaria

The 2010 Balkan Badminton Championships (Bulgarian: балканско първенство по бадминтон 2010) was a badminton tournament sanctioned by the Balkan Badminton Association and Badminton Europe. The individual and mixed team events were held from 24 to 26 September 2010.

The tournament was held at the Kaliakra Sports Complex in Kavarna, Bulgaria. Six countries took part in the championships. In the team event, Bulgaria defeated Turkey 3–0 in the final while Romania defeated Moldova 3–2 in the third place playoffs.

Bulgaria topped the individual events, winning four out of five titles. Turkey placed second on the medal table with a gold medal, four silver medals and four bronze medals.

== Medal summary ==
=== Medalists ===
Event	Gold	Silver	Bronze
Men's singles	(Bulgaria) Krasimir Jankov	(Turkey) Ramazan Öztürk	(Bulgaria) Ivan Rusev
Men's singles	(Bulgaria) Krasimir Jankov	(Turkey) Ramazan Öztürk	(Bulgaria) Dimitar Delchev
Women's singles	(Turkey) Öznur Çalışkan	(Turkey) Neslihan Yiğit	(Bulgaria) Stefani Stoeva
Women's singles	(Turkey) Öznur Çalışkan	(Turkey) Neslihan Yiğit	(Bulgaria) Dimitria Popstoikova
Men's doubles	(Bulgaria) Krasimir Jankov (Bulgaria) Vladimir Metodiev	(Bulgaria) Sarkis Agopyan (Bulgaria) Julian Hristov	(Turkey) Emre Aslan (Turkey) Hüseyin Oruç
Men's doubles	(Bulgaria) Krasimir Jankov (Bulgaria) Vladimir Metodiev	(Bulgaria) Sarkis Agopyan (Bulgaria) Julian Hristov	(Turkey) Emre Lale (Turkey) Emre Vural
Women's doubles	(Bulgaria) Gabriela Stoeva (Bulgaria) Stefani Stoeva	(Turkey) Neslihan Kılıç (Turkey) Neslihan Yiğit	(Bulgaria) Bistra Maneva (Bulgaria) Dimitria Popstoikova
Women's doubles	(Bulgaria) Gabriela Stoeva (Bulgaria) Stefani Stoeva	(Turkey) Neslihan Kılıç (Turkey) Neslihan Yiğit	(Romania) Florentina Constantinescu (Romania) Alexandra Milon
Mixed doubles	(Bulgaria) Julian Hristov (Bulgaria) Dimitria Popstoikova	(Bulgaria) Vladimir Metodiev (Bulgaria) Bistra Maneva	(Turkey) Ramazan Öztürk (Turkey) Neslihan Kılıç
Mixed doubles	(Bulgaria) Julian Hristov (Bulgaria) Dimitria Popstoikova	(Bulgaria) Vladimir Metodiev (Bulgaria) Bistra Maneva	(Turkey) Hüseyin Oruç (Turkey) Ebru Tunalı
Mixed team	Bulgaria; Sarkis Agopyan; Dimitar Delchev; Julian Hristov; Krasimir Jankov; Vladimir Metodiev; Ivan Rusev; Bistra Maneva; Dimitria Popstoikova; Gabriela Stoeva; Stefani Stoeva	Turkey; Emre Aslan; Emre Lale; Hüseyin Oruç; Ramazan Öztürk; Emre Vural; Neslihan Kılıç; Ebru Tunalı; Neslihan Yiğit	Romania; Robert Ciobotaru; Daniel Cojocaru; Ionut Gradinaru; Florin Patroaica; Florentina Constantinescu; Magda Lozniceriu; Alexandra Milon

=== Medal table ===
* Host nation (Bulgaria)

Rank	Nation	Gold	Silver	Bronze	Total
1	Bulgaria*	5	2	5	12
2	Turkey	1	4	4	9
3	Romania	0	0	2	2
Totals (3 entries)		6	6	11	23

== Team event ==
=== Group stage ===
==== Group A ====
Pos	Team	Pld	W	L	MF	MA	MD	Pts	Qualification
1	Bulgaria (H)	2	2	0	10	0	+10	2	Advance to knockout stage
2	Moldova	2	1	1	4	6	−2	1	Advance to knockout stage
3	Serbia	2	0	2	1	9	−8	0	

Source: novsport.com
(H) Host

==== Group B ====
Pos	Team	Pld	W	L	MF	MA	MD	Pts	Qualification
1	Turkey	2	2	0	10	0	+10	2	Advance to knockout stage
2	Romania	2	1	1	5	5	0	1	Advance to knockout stage
3	North Macedonia	2	0	2	0	10	−10	0	

Source: novsport.com

=== Knockout stage ===
==== Bracket ====
Semi-finals
Bulgaria	4
Romania	1
Moldova	0
Turkey	5

Final
Bulgaria	3
Turkey	0
Third place
Romania	3
Moldova	2
