= Balkan Badminton Championships =

Regional badminton championships

The Balkan Badminton Championships is a regional badminton tournament organized by the Balkan Badminton Association (BBA) to crown the best badminton players and teams in the Balkans. The inaugural edition of the championships was hosted in 1992 in Bucharest, Romania. The junior team championships are divided into four different age groups, which are U19, U17, U15 and U13.

== Nations participating ==
- Greece (from 1992)
- Romania (from 1992)
- Bulgaria (from 1992)
- Turkey (from 1992)
- Moldova (from 1999)
- Serbia (from 2006)
- North Macedonia (from 2005)
- Bosnia and Herzegovina (from 2013)
- Albania (from 2013)
- Croatia (from 2013)
- Montenegro (from 2016)
- Georgia (from 2019)

=== Former nations ===
- Serbia and Montenegro (1992-2006)

== Championships ==
Year	Number	Host city	Host country	Events
1992	1	Bucharest	Romania	1
1993	2	Sofia	Bulgaria	6
1995	3	Kütahya	Turkey	6
1996	~~4~~	~~Thessaloniki~~	~~Greece~~	6
1997	4	Šabac	Serbia and Montenegro	6
1998	5	Kütahya	Turkey	6
1999	6	Argostoli	Greece	6
2000	7	Varna	Bulgaria	6
2001	8	Burgas	Bulgaria	6
2002	9	Argostoli	Greece	6
2003	10	Bucharest	Romania	6
2004	11	Istanbul	Turkey	6
2005	12	Serres	Greece	6
2006	13	İzmit	Turkey	6
2007	14	Stara Zagora	Bulgaria	6
2008	15	Slănic-Moldova	Romania	6
2009	16	Stara Zagora	Bulgaria	6
2010	17	Kavarna	Bulgaria	6
2011	18	Polygyros	Greece	6

Year	Number	Host city	Host country	Events
2012	19	Burgas	Bulgaria	6
2013	20	Burgas	Bulgaria	6
2014	21	Stara Zagora	Bulgaria	6
2016	22	Iași	Romania	6
2018	23	Orestiada	Greece	6

== Past winners ==
=== Individual event ===
Year	Men's Singles	Women's Singles	Men's Doubles	Women's Doubles	Mixed Doubles
1992	Not held				
1993					
1995
1996	Cancelled				
1997	(Bulgaria) Boris Kessov	(Bulgaria) Dobrinka Smilianova	(Bulgaria) Mihail Popov (Bulgaria) Svetoslav Stoyanov	(Bulgaria) Margarita Mladenova (Bulgaria) Raina Tzvetkova	(Bulgaria) Svetoslav Stoyanov (Bulgaria) Raina Tzvetkova
1998	(Bulgaria) Konstantin Dobrev	(Bulgaria) Dimitriyka Dimitrova	(Bulgaria) Konstantin Dobrev (Bulgaria) Ivan Sotirov	(Bulgaria) Diana Koleva (Bulgaria) Renni Assenova	(Bulgaria) Konstantin Dobrev (Bulgaria) Diana Koleva
1999	(Bulgaria) Konstantin Dobrev	(Bulgaria) Neli Boteva	(Bulgaria) Konstantin Dobrev (Bulgaria) Luben Panov	(Bulgaria) Neli Boteva (Bulgaria) Dobrinka Smilianova	(Bulgaria) Konstantin Dobrev (Bulgaria) Petya Nedelcheva
2000	(Bulgaria) Konstantin Dobrev	(Bulgaria) Neli Boteva	(Bulgaria) Konstantin Dobrev (Bulgaria) Luben Panov	(Bulgaria) Neli Boteva (Bulgaria) Petya Nedelcheva	(Bulgaria) Konstantin Dobrev (Bulgaria) Petya Nedelcheva
2001	No data				
2002	No data				
2003	No data				
2004	(Bulgaria) Georgi Petrov	(Bulgaria) Petya Nedelcheva	(Bulgaria) Krasimir Jankov (Bulgaria) Georgi Petrov	(Bulgaria) Neli Boteva (Bulgaria) Petya Nedelcheva	(Bulgaria) Julian Hristov (Bulgaria) Petya Nedelcheva
2005	(Bulgaria) Konstantin Dobrev	(Bulgaria) Petya Nedelcheva	(Bulgaria) Konstantin Dobrev (Bulgaria) Georgi Petrov	(Bulgaria) Dimitriyka Dimitrova (Bulgaria) Diana Dimova	(Bulgaria) Konstantin Dobrev (Bulgaria) Maya Ivanova
2006	(Bulgaria) Georgi Petrov	(Bulgaria) Diana Dimova	(Bulgaria) Stiliyan Makarski (Bulgaria) Georgi Petrov	(Bulgaria) Diana Dimova (Bulgaria) Atanaska Spasova	(Bulgaria) Stiliyan Makarski (Bulgaria) Diana Dimova
2007	(Bulgaria) Krasimir Jankov	(Bulgaria) Diana Dimova	(Bulgaria) Stiliyan Makarski (Bulgaria) Vladimir Metodiev	(Bulgaria) Diana Dimova (Bulgaria) Dimitria Popstoikova	(Bulgaria) Vladimir Metodiev (Bulgaria) Diana Dimova
2008	(Romania) Robert Ciobotaru	(Bulgaria) Dimitria Popstoikova	(Bulgaria) Konstantin Dobrev (Bulgaria) Julian Hristov	(Bulgaria) Dimitria Popstoikova (Bulgaria) Diana Dimova	(Bulgaria) Konstantin Dobrev (Bulgaria) Diana Dimova
2009	(Bulgaria) Stiliyan Makarski	(Bulgaria) Petya Nedelcheva	(Turkey) Kamil Akcebe (Turkey) Ali Kaya	(Bulgaria) Diana Dimova (Bulgaria) Petya Nedelcheva	(Bulgaria) Stiliyan Makarski (Bulgaria) Diana Dimova
2010	(Bulgaria) Krasimir Jankov	(Turkey) Öznur Çalışkan	(Bulgaria) Krasimir Jankov (Bulgaria) Vladimir Metodiev	(Bulgaria) Gabriela Stoeva (Bulgaria) Stefani Stoeva	(Bulgaria) Julian Hristov (Bulgaria) Dimitria Popstoikova
2011	(Turkey) Ramazan Öztürk	(Greece) Anne Hald Jensen	(Bulgaria) Peyo Boichinov (Bulgaria) Ivan Rusev	(Bulgaria) Dimitria Popstoikova (Bulgaria) Gabriela Stoeva	(Bulgaria) Julian Hristov (Bulgaria) Gabriela Stoeva
2012	(Turkey) Emre Vural	(Turkey) Özge Bayrak	(Turkey) Emre Aslan (Turkey) Hüseyin Oruç	(Bulgaria) Gabriela Stoeva (Bulgaria) Stefani Stoeva	(Turkey) Hüseyin Oruç (Turkey) Ebru Tunalı
2013	(Bulgaria) Ivan Rusev	(Bulgaria) Stefani Stoeva	(Romania) Marius Corciuc (Romania) Ionut Gradinaru	(Bulgaria) Gabriela Stoeva (Bulgaria) Stefani Stoeva	(Bulgaria) Stiliyan Makarski (Bulgaria) Gabriela Stoeva
2014	(Bulgaria) Blagovest Kisyov	(Turkey) Neslihan Yiğit	(Bulgaria) Blagovest Kisyov (Bulgaria) Peyo Boichinov	(Bulgaria) Gabriela Stoeva (Bulgaria) Stefani Stoeva	(Bulgaria) Blagovest Kisyov (Bulgaria) Gabriela Stoeva
2016	(Bulgaria) Ivan Rusev	(Bulgaria) Maria Delcheva	(Bulgaria) Daniel Nikolov (Bulgaria) Ivan Rusev	(Bulgaria) Maria Delcheva (Romania) Alexandra Milon	(Romania) Daniel Cojocaru (Romania) Alexandra Milon
2018	(Bulgaria) Daniel Nikolov	(Turkey) Aliye Demirbağ	(Bulgaria) Daniel Nikolov (Bulgaria) Alex Vlaar	(Turkey) Aliye Demirbağ (Turkey) Neslihan Yiğit	(Bulgaria) Alex Vlaar (Bulgaria) Dimitria Popstoikova

=== Mixed team event ===
Ed.	Year	Hosts	Final			Third place playoff or losing semi-finalists			Number of teams
Ed.	Year	Hosts	Champions	Score	Runners-up	Third place	Score	Fourth place	Number of teams
1	1992	Romania	Bulgaria	round-robin	Romania	Greece	round-robin	–	4
2	1993	Bulgaria	Bulgaria	round-robin	Romania	Greece	round-robin	–	4
3	1995	Turkey	Bulgaria	round-robin	Romania	Turkey	round-robin	Greece	5
4	1997	Serbia and Montenegro	Bulgaria	round-robin	Romania	Turkey	round-robin	Greece	5
5	1998	Turkey	Bulgaria	round-robin	Romania	Moldova	round-robin	Greece	6
6	1999	Greece	Bulgaria	round-robin	Romania	Moldova	round-robin	Turkey	6
7	2000	Bulgaria	Bulgaria	round-robin	Romania	Turkey	round-robin	Greece	6
8	2001	Bulgaria	Bulgaria	round-robin	Romania	Turkey	round-robin	Greece	6
9	2002	Greece	Bulgaria	round-robin	Romania	Turkey	round-robin	Greece	6
10	2003	Romania	Bulgaria	round-robin	Romania	Turkey	round-robin	Moldova	6
11	2004	Turkey	Bulgaria	round-robin	Romania	Turkey	round-robin	Moldova	6
12	2005	Greece	Bulgaria	3–0	Romania	Greece	3–1	Moldova	7
13	2006	Turkey	Bulgaria	3–0	Turkey	Moldova	3–2	Romania	5
14	2007	Bulgaria	Bulgaria	3–0	Turkey	Romania	3–0	Greece	6
15	2008	Romania	Bulgaria	3–1	Romania	Turkey	3–0	Greece	6
16	2009	Bulgaria	Bulgaria	3–0	Turkey	Greece and Serbia			6
17	2010	Bulgaria	Bulgaria	3–0	Turkey	Romania	3–2	Moldova	6
18	2011	Greece	Bulgaria	3–1	Turkey	Greece and Serbia			6
19	2012	Bulgaria	Turkey	3–0	Bulgaria	Romania	3–0	Moldova	8
20	2013	Bulgaria	Bulgaria	3–0	Turkey	Romania and Serbia			7
21	2014	Bulgaria	Bulgaria	3–0	Turkey	Greece and Romania			6
22	2016	Romania	Bulgaria	round-robin	Romania	Serbia	round-robin	Moldova	4
23	2018	Greece	Bulgaria	3–2	Turkey	Greece and Serbia			6

== Junior championships (U19) ==
=== Mixed team event ===
Ed.	Year	Host city	Final			Third place playoff or losing semi-finalists			Number of teams
Ed.	Year	Host city	Champions	Score	Runners-up	Third place	Score	Fourth place	Number of teams
1	1992	Bucharest	Bulgaria	round-robin	Romania	Turkey	–	–	3
2	1993	Istanbul	Bulgaria	round-robin	Romania	Turkey	round-robin	Turkey B	4
3	1994	Sofia	Bulgaria	round-robin	Romania	Turkey	–	–	3
4	1995	Bucharest	Romania	round-robin	Bulgaria	Turkey	round-robin	Greece	4
5	1996	Sofia	Bulgaria	round-robin	Turkey	Greece	–	–	3
6	1997	Adapazarı	Bulgaria	round-robin	Romania	Turkey	round-robin	Greece	6
7	1998	Patras	Bulgaria	round-robin	Romania	Turkey	round-robin	Greece	6
8	1999	Ankara	Bulgaria	round-robin	Romania	Moldova	round-robin	Turkey	6
9	2000	Istanbul	Romania	round-robin	Bulgaria	Turkey	round-robin	Moldova	5
10	2001	Galati	Bulgaria	round-robin	Romania	Moldova	round-robin	Greece	5
11	2002	Sofia	Bulgaria	round-robin	Romania	Moldova	round-robin	Greece	5
12	2004	Thessaloniki	Bulgaria	round-robin	Turkey	Moldova	round-robin	Romania	5
13	2005	Varna	Bulgaria	round-robin	Turkey	Romania	round-robin	Moldova	7
14	2006	Sofia	Turkey	round-robin	Bulgaria	Romania	round-robin	North Macedonia	4
15	2007	Adapazarı	Bulgaria	3–2	Turkey	Greece and Romania			7
16	2008	Bafra	Turkey	round-robin	Bulgaria	Romania	round-robin	Greece	5
17	2010	Orestiada	Turkey	3–2	Bulgaria	Romania	3–2	Serbia	6
18	2011	Edirne	Bulgaria	3–1	Turkey	Romania and Serbia			7
19	2012	Onești	Bulgaria	round-robin	Turkey	Romania	round-robin	Greece	4
20	2013	Manisa	Bulgaria	round-robin	Turkey	North Macedonia	round-robin	Greece	4
21	2015	Karaman	Turkey	3–0	Bulgaria	Romania and Serbia			6
22	2016	Alexandroupolis	Turkey	3–0	Bulgaria	Greece and Serbia			6
23	2017	Edirne	Turkey	3–2	Bulgaria	Greece and Serbia			6
24	2019	Ankara	Turkey	3–2	Serbia	Bulgaria and Georgia			6

== Youth championships (U17) ==
=== Mixed team event ===
Year	Ed.	Host	City	(gold) Champions	(silver) Runners-up	(bronze) Third place	Rankings
1997	1	Greece	Argostoli	Bulgaria	Romania	Turkey	1. Bulgaria; 2. Romania; 3. Turkey; 4. Greece; 5. Moldova; 6. Serbia and Montenegro
1998	2	Romania	Bucharest	Bulgaria	Romania	Turkey	1. Bulgaria; 2. Romania; 3. Turkey; 4. Moldova; 5. Greece
1999	3	Moldova	Chișinău	Romania	Bulgaria	Moldova	1. Romania; 2. Bulgaria; 3. Moldova; 4. Greece
2000	4	Moldova	Chișinău	Bulgaria	Moldova	Romania	1. Bulgaria; 2. Moldova; 3. Romania; 4. Turkey; 5. Greece
2002	5	Turkey	Istanbul	Bulgaria	Turkey	Romania	1. Bulgaria; 2. Turkey; 3. Romania; 4. Moldova; 5. Greece; 6. Serbia and Montenegro
2003	6	Turkey	Istanbul	Moldova	Bulgaria	Turkey	1. Moldova; 2. Bulgaria; 3. Turkey; 4. Romania; 5. Greece
2004	7	Bulgaria	Haskovo	Bulgaria	Romania	Turkey	1. Bulgaria; 2. Romania; 3. Turkey; 4. Greece; 5. North Macedonia
2005	8	Turkey	Mersin	Turkey	Bulgaria	Turkey B	1. Turkey; 2. Bulgaria; 3. Turkey B; 4. Romania; 5. Greece
2006	9	Greece	Thessaloniki	Turkey	Bulgaria	Greece	1. Turkey; 2. Bulgaria; 3. Greece; 4. Romania; 5. Serbia; Montenegro (Withdrew)
2008	10	Greece	Sidirokastro	Turkey	Bulgaria	Greece	1. Turkey; 2. Bulgaria; 3. Greece; 4. Romania; 5. Serbia
2011	11	Turkey	Edirne	Bulgaria	Turkey	Greece North Macedonia	1. Bulgaria; 2. Turkey; 3. Greece; 3. North Macedonia; 5. Romania; 6. Greece; 7. Turkey B
2013	12	Turkey	Istanbul	Turkey	Bulgaria	Greece Romania	1. Turkey; 2. Bulgaria; 3. Romania; 3. Greece; 5. Serbia; 6. North Macedonia
2014	13	Serbia	Kladovo	Turkey	Bulgaria	Greece Romania	1. Turkey; 2. Bulgaria; 3. Romania; 3. Greece; 5. Croatia; 6. Serbia; 7. Bosnia and Herzegovina
2015	14	Serbia	Novi Sad	Turkey	Bulgaria	Romania Serbia	1. Turkey; 2. Bulgaria; 3. Romania; 3. Serbia; 5. Croatia; 6. Bosnia and Herzegovina
2016	15	Turkey	Bursa	Turkey	Bulgaria	Romania Serbia	1. Turkey; 2. Bulgaria; 3. Romania; 3. Serbia; 5. Moldova; 6. Greece
2018	16	Serbia	Novi Sad	Serbia	Turkey	Bulgaria	1. Serbia; 2. Turkey; 3. Bulgaria; 4. Romania; 5. Greece
2019	17	Serbia	Novi Sad	Serbia	Romania	Turkey Bulgaria	1. Serbia; 2. Romania; 3. Turkey; 3. Bulgaria; 5. Greece; 6. Croatia
2023	18	Romania	Galați	Turkey	Romania	Moldova	1. Turkey; 2. Romania; 3. Moldova; 4. Bulgaria
2024	19	Romania	Galați	Romania	Bulgaria	Greece	1. Romania; 2. Bulgaria; 3. Greece; 4. Moldova
