= Turkish National Badminton Championships =

The Turkish National Badminton Championships is a tournament organized to crown the best badminton players in Turkey.

The tournament started in 1993 and is held every year.

== Past winners ==
Year	Men's singles	Women's singles	Men's doubles	Women's doubles	Mixed doubles
1993	Sahabettin Tavukcu	Fatma Koseouglu	Fatih Dulger; Ramazan Imamoglu	Deniz Arici; Gul Simsek	Hakan Boran; Hakan Boran
1994	Murat Bozkurt	Gul Simsek	Sehabettin Tavukgu; Sevki Acar	Banu Erol; Fatma Koseogin	Mustafa Babacan; Elif Yoruker
1995	Mert Aydogmus	Gul Simsek	Mert Aydogmus; Fatih Kaymaz	Gul Simsek; Elif Yoruker	Mustafa Babacan; Elif Yoruker
1996	Mert Aydogmus	Gul Simsek	Mert Aydogmus; Zafer Sahin	Gul Simsek; Serpil Beyanal	Mustafa Babacan; Elif Yoruker
1997	No competition				
1998	Mert Aydogmus	Elif Aktas	Mert Aydogmus; Zafer Sahin	Ulviye Bese; Suleyla Ozdal	Fatih Kaymaz; Elif Aktas
1999	Mert Aydogmus	Elif Aktas	Mert Aydogmus; Zafer Sahin	Nursel Dogan; Sevil Bozyil	Arda Akgul; Elif Aktas
2000	Mert Aydogmus	Elif Aktas	Mehmet Tural; Yavuz Yigit	Nursel Dogan; Sevil Bozyil	Mehmet Tural; Elif Aktas
2001	Mehmet Tural	Elif Aktas	Mehmet Tural; Umit Altin	Elif Aktas; Ümmü Gülsüm Kiraz	Mert Aydogmus; Nursel Dogan
2002	Mert Aydogmus	Elif Aktas	Mehmet Tural; Yavuz Yigit	Nursel Dogan; Sevil Bozyıl	Mehmet Tural; Elif Aktas
2003	Mehmet Tural	Nursel Dogan	Ümit Altin; Ali Kaya	Aliye Gülcin Köse; Heves Naziroglu	Mehmet Tural; Nursel Dogan
2004	Mehmet Tural	Hatice Nurgül Sen	Hüseyin Hancerli; Mehmet Tural	Aliye Gülcin Köse; Aydan Köse	Baris Boyar; Elif Ôzaraci
2005	Mehmet Tural	Nursel Dogan	Yavuz Yigit; Ûmit Altin	Gamze Cerit; Ezgi Epice	Mehmet Tural; Nursel Dogan
2006	Göksel Kundakçı	Ezgi Epice	Nuri Balkan; Ali Kaya	Ezgi Epice; Sıdıka Kulatay	Nuri Balkan; Sıdıka Kulatay
2007	Mustafa Yalvarici	Nursel Aydogmus	Murat Sen; Erhan Devrilmez	Ezgi Epice; Sıdıka Kulatay	Hakan Keskin; Nursel Aydogmus
2008	Göksel Kundakçı	Ezgi Epice	Mehmet Tural; Ümit Altın	Ebru Tunali; Özge Bayrak	Ali Kaya; Ezgi Epice
2009	No competition				
2010	Emre Lale	Neslihan Yiğit	Emre Lale; Murat Sen	Neslihan Yiğit; Neslihan Kılıç	Ramazan Öztürk; Neslihan Kılıç
2011	No competition				
2012	Emre Lale	Özge Bayrak	Hüseyin Oruç; Emre Aslan	Özge Bayrak; Ebru Tunalı	Ramazan Öztürk; Neslihan Yiğit
2013	No competition				
2014	Ramazan Öztürk	Neslihan Yiğit	Emre Vural; Sinan Zorlu	Özge Bayrak; Neslihan Yiğit	Ramazan Öztürk; Neslihan Kılıç
2015	No competition				
2016					
2017	Emre Lale	Cemre Fere	Yusuf Ramazan Bay; Sinan Zorlu	Bengisu Erçetin; Nazlıcan İnci	Yusuf Ramazan Bay; Özge Bayrak
2018	Emre Lale	Özge Bayrak	Serdar Koca; Serhat Salım	Bengisu Erçetin; Nazlıcan İnci	Emre Sönmez; Zehra Erdem
2019	Emre Lale	Özge Bayrak	Mehmet Çapar; Emre Sönmez	Bengisu Erçetin; Nazlıcan İnci	Emre Lale; Özge Bayrak
