= Serbia and Montenegro national badminton team =

Former national badminton team representing Serbia and Montenegro

Serbia and Montenegro
- Association: Badminton Savez Jugoslavije (BSJ)
- Confederation: BE (Europe)

BWF ranking
- Highest ranking: 99 (1 July 2011)

The Serbia and Montenegro national badminton team (Serbian: Репрезентација Србије и Црне Горе у бадминтону) represented Serbia and Montenegro in international badminton competitions. The national team reached its highest ranking at 99 on 1 July 2011.

The team ceased to exist soon after the independence of both Montenegro and Serbia which led to the formation of the Serbia national badminton team and the Montenegro national badminton team.

== History ==
Following the breakup of Yugoslavia in 1992, the governing body of Yugoslavian badminton, Badminton Savez Jugoslavije was revived on 19 September 1993 and became affiliated with the Badminton World Federation. The team competed in international individual events, which were the Slovenian International, Bulgarian International and the Yugoslavian International. The team also competed in the Balkan Mixed Team Badminton Championships. The country once hosted the championships in 1997.

=== Mixed team ===
Badminton Savez Jugoslavije sent a total of 6 players to compete in the 1995 Balkan Mixed Team Badminton Championships. The team finished in 5th place after losing 3–2 to Greece. In 1997, the team competed in the 1997 Balkan Mixed Team Championships as the host team and placed 5th. In 2005, the team placed 5th in the 2005 Balkan Mixed Team Championships after winning 3–2 against Greece's second squad. Before the split of Serbia and Montenegro, the team competed their last tournament at the 2006 Balkan Mixed Team Badminton Championships. The team lost narrowly to Moldova but dominated North Macedonia 5–0 in their second match. The team finished in 5th place.

== Competitive record ==
=== Thomas Cup ===
Year	Round	Pos
1949	Part of Yugoslavia	
1952	Part of Yugoslavia	
1955	Part of Yugoslavia	
1958	Part of Yugoslavia	
1961	Part of Yugoslavia	
1964	Part of Yugoslavia	
1967	Part of Yugoslavia	
1970	Part of Yugoslavia	
1973	Part of Yugoslavia	
1976	Part of Yugoslavia	
1979	Part of Yugoslavia	
1982	Part of Yugoslavia	
1984	Part of Yugoslavia	
1986	Part of Yugoslavia	
1988	Part of Yugoslavia	
1990	Part of Yugoslavia	
1992	Did not enter	
1994	Did not enter	
1996	Did not enter	
1998	Did not enter	
2000	Did not enter	
2002	Did not enter	
2004	Did not enter	
2006	Did not enter	

=== Uber Cup ===
Year	Round	Pos
1957	Part of Yugoslavia	
1960	Part of Yugoslavia	
1963	Part of Yugoslavia	
1966	Part of Yugoslavia	
1969	Part of Yugoslavia	
1972	Part of Yugoslavia	
1975	Part of Yugoslavia	
1978	Part of Yugoslavia	
1981	Part of Yugoslavia	
1984	Part of Yugoslavia	
1986	Part of Yugoslavia	
1988	Part of Yugoslavia	
1990	Part of Yugoslavia	
1992	Did not enter	
1994	Did not enter	
1996	Did not enter	
1998	Did not enter	
2000	Did not enter	
2002	Did not enter	
2004	Did not enter	
2006	Did not enter	

=== Sudirman Cup ===
Year	Round	Pos
1989	Part of Yugoslavia	
1991	Part of Yugoslavia	
1993	Did not enter	
1995	Did not enter	
1997	Did not enter	
1999	Did not enter	
2001	Did not enter	
2003	Did not enter	
2005	Did not enter	

=== European Team Championships ===
==== Men's team ====
Year	Round	Pos
2004	Did not enter	
2006	Did not enter	

==== Women's team ====
Year	Round	Pos
2004	Did not enter	
2006	Did not enter	

==== Mixed team ====
Year	Round	Pos
1972	Part of Yugoslavia	
1974	Part of Yugoslavia	
1976	Part of Yugoslavia	
1978	Part of Yugoslavia	
1980	Part of Yugoslavia	
1982	Part of Yugoslavia	
1984	Part of Yugoslavia	
1986	Part of Yugoslavia	
1988	Part of Yugoslavia	
1990	Part of Yugoslavia	
1992	Part of Yugoslavia	
1994	Did not enter	
1996	Did not enter	
1998	Did not enter	
2000	Did not enter	
2002	Did not enter	
2004	Did not enter	
2006	Did not enter	

=== Balkan Badminton Championships ===
==== Mixed team ====
Year	Round	Pos
1992	Did not enter	
1993	Did not enter	
1994	Did not enter	
1995	Fifth place	5th
1996	Did not enter	
1997	Fifth place	5th
1998	Did not enter	
1999	Sixth place	6th
2000	Sixth place	6th
2001	Sixth place	6th
2002	Sixth place	6th
2003	Sixth place	6th
2004	Sixth place	6th
2005	Group stage	6th
2006	Fifth place	5th

**Red border color indicates tournament was held on home soil.

== Junior competitive record ==
=== Suhandinata Cup ===
Year	Round	Pos
2000	Did not enter	
2002	Did not enter	
2004	Did not enter	

=== European Junior Team Championships ===
==== Mixed team ====
Year	Round	Pos
1975	Part of Yugoslavia	
1977	Part of Yugoslavia	
1979	Part of Yugoslavia	
1981	Part of Yugoslavia	
1983	Part of Yugoslavia	
1985	Part of Yugoslavia	
1987	Part of Yugoslavia	
1989	Part of Yugoslavia	
1991	Part of Yugoslavia	
1993	Did not enter	
1995	Did not enter	
1997	Did not enter	
1999	Did not enter	
2001	Did not enter	
2003	Did not enter	
2005	Did not enter	

**Red border color indicates tournament was held on home soil.

== Players ==
=== Squad ===
As of 1998

==== Men's team ====
Name	DoB/Age	Ranking of event		
Name	DoB/Age	MS	MD	XD
Jovan Marković	29 June 1976 (aged 22)	-	-	-
Zoran Stepanović	15 March 1969 (aged 29)	-	-	-
Radomir Jovović	15 December 1979 (aged 19)	-	-	-
Vladimir Stanojevic	1974 (aged 24)	-	-	-

==== Women's team ====
Name	DoB/Age	Ranking of event		
Name	DoB/Age	MS	MD	XD
Jelena Obrić	1972 (aged 26)	-	-	-
Jovanka Knežević	1972 (aged 26)	-	-	-
Ana Marić	1976 (aged 22)	-	-	-
Marija Glogovac	1973 (aged 25)	-	-	-
