= Turkish Badminton Federation =

- Abbreviation: TBF
- Formation: 31 May 1991; 34 years ago
- Type: Sports federation
- Headquarters: Ulus, Ankara, Turkey
- Coordinates: 39°56′30.85″N 32°51′15.60″E
- President: Ercan Yıldız
- Affiliations: Badminton Europe Confederation
- Website: www.badminton.gov.tr

The Turkish Badminton Federation (Turkish: Türkiye Badminton Federasyonu, TBF) is the governing body for badminton in Turkey. It aims to govern, encourage and develop the sport for all throughout the country.

== History ==
The TBF was established on 31 May 1991. Its first president was İrfan Yıldırım. The TBF was accepted by International Badminton Federation as the 104th member at 3 November 1991. Continentally, it is a member of the Badminton Europe confederation.

After the first elections held for sports federations in Turkey on 5 December 1993, Akın Taşkent became the second president of the federation (but the first elected). Between 1997–2004, the federation was governed by A. Faik İmamoğlu, serving for two terms. Between 2004–2023, the federation was governed by Murat Özmekik, serving for five terms.

The federation organizes the Turkish National Badminton Championships, the Turkiye International and the Turkish Badminton League.

== Leagues ==
After the first tournament with 24 teams from 11 regions, 8 teams won the right to compete at Turkish Badminton League.

Today the federation organizes the following leagues in Turkey:

- Badminton First League: 12 teams
- Badminton Second League: 20 teams
- Juniors First League: 12 teams
- Juniors Second League: 20 teams
- University First and Second League: Teams of 38 universities.

== International competitions ==
=== Participation ===
Turkey participated for the first time at the Olympics in 2012 with Neslihan Yiğit, who was eliminated in the women's singles group stage.

=== Hosted ===
- 2013 European Junior Badminton Championships - Ankara Arena in Ankara, 22–31 March 2013

== See also ==
- List of naturalized sportspeople of Turkey national badminton teams
