= Yugoslavian International =

1998 badminton tournament

The Yugoslavian International was a badminton tournament held in Serbia and Montenegro. The tournament was hosted once in 1998 in the capital city of Belgrade. There were only three disciplines in the tournament, which were men's singles, women's singles and men's doubles. The 1998 tournament was a BWF International Series level tournament.

== Previous winners ==
Year	Men's singles	Women's singles	Men's doubles	Women's doubles	Mixed doubles
1998	(Serbia and Montenegro) Jovan Marković	(Serbia and Montenegro) Jelena Obrić	(Serbia and Montenegro) Bojan Jakovljević (Serbia and Montenegro) Jovan Marković	(Serbia and Montenegro) Jelena Obrić (Serbia and Montenegro) Marija Glogovac	(Serbia and Montenegro) Bojan Jakovljević (Serbia and Montenegro) Jelena Obrić

== Performances by nation ==
As of the 1998 edition

Pos	Nation	MS	WS	MD	WD	XD	Total
1	Serbia and Montenegro	1	1	1	1	1	5
Total		1	1	1	1	1	5
