= Badminton at the 2013 Mediterranean Games =

- Venue: Mersin University Hall
- Dates: 25–30 June

The badminton tournaments at the 2013 Mediterranean Games in Mersin took place between 25 June and 30 June at the Mersin University Hall. This was the first time that badminton events held at the Mediterranean Games.

Athletes competed in four events: men's singles, women's singles, men's doubles and women's doubles.

== Medal table ==
* Host nation (Turkey)

Rank	Nation	Gold	Silver	Bronze	Total
1	Turkey*	2	2	0	4
2	France	1	1	2	4
3	Croatia	1	0	0	1
4	Spain	0	1	0	1
5	Slovenia	0	0	2	2
Totals (5 entries)		4	4	4	12

== Medal summary ==
=== Medalists ===
Event	Gold	Silver	Bronze
Men's singles	Brice Leverdez; France	Pablo Abian; Spain	Matthieu Lo Ying Ping; France
Men's doubles	Croatia (CRO); Zvonimir Đurkinjak; Zvonimir Hölbling	Turkey (TUR); Emre Arslan; Hüseyin Oruç	France (FRA); Baptiste Careme; Gaetan Mittelheisser
Women's singles	Neslihan Yiğit; Turkey	Özge Bayrak; Turkey	Maja Tvrdy; Slovenia
Women's doubles	Turkey (TUR); Neslihan Yiğit; Özge Bayrak	France (FRA); Emilie Lefel; Audrey Fontaine	Slovenia (SLO); Maja Tvrdy; Nika Končut
