= 2004 Balkan Badminton Championships =

Tournament details
- Dates: 27–30 May
- Venue: Ahmet Cömert Sport Hall
- Location: Istanbul, Turkey

The 2004 Balkan Badminton Championships (Turkish: Balkan Büyükler Badminton Şampiyonası 2004) was a badminton tournament sanctioned by the Balkan Badminton Association and Badminton Europe. The individual and mixed team events were held from 27 to 30 May 2004.

The tournament was held in Istanbul, Turkey. Six countries took part in the championships. In the team event, Bulgaria finished in first place with 5 wins while Romania finished in second place with four wins. Hosts Turkey finished in third place with 3 wins.

== Medal summary ==
=== Medalists ===
Event	Gold	Silver	Bronze
Men's singles	(Bulgaria) Georgi Petrov	(Bulgaria) Krasimir Jankov	(Greece) Pavlos Charalambidis
Men's singles	(Bulgaria) Georgi Petrov	(Bulgaria) Krasimir Jankov	(Turkey) Mehmet Tural
Women's singles	(Bulgaria) Petya Nedelcheva	(Bulgaria) Linda Zetchiri	(Romania) Florentina Petre
Women's singles	(Bulgaria) Petya Nedelcheva	(Bulgaria) Linda Zetchiri	(Turkey) Hatice Nurgül Sen
Men's doubles	(Bulgaria) Krasimir Jankov (Bulgaria) Georgi Petrov	(Bulgaria) Stiliyan Makarski (Bulgaria) Julian Hristov	(Romania) Robert Ciobotaru (Romania) George Constantinescu
Men's doubles	(Bulgaria) Krasimir Jankov (Bulgaria) Georgi Petrov	(Bulgaria) Stiliyan Makarski (Bulgaria) Julian Hristov	(Greece) Giorgios Patis (Greece) Theodoros Velkos
Women's doubles	(Bulgaria) Neli Boteva (Bulgaria) Petya Nedelcheva	(Bulgaria) Gabriela Banova (Bulgaria) Linda Zetchiri	(Romania) Alexandra Olariu (Romania) Florentina Petre
Women's doubles	(Bulgaria) Neli Boteva (Bulgaria) Petya Nedelcheva	(Bulgaria) Gabriela Banova (Bulgaria) Linda Zetchiri	(Moldova) Natalia Coseli (Moldova) Nadejda Litvinenco
Mixed doubles	(Bulgaria) Julian Hristov (Bulgaria) Petya Nedelcheva	(Bulgaria) Stiliyan Makarski (Bulgaria) Linda Zetchiri	(Bulgaria) Konstantin Dobrev (Bulgaria) Gabriela Banova
Mixed doubles	(Bulgaria) Julian Hristov (Bulgaria) Petya Nedelcheva	(Bulgaria) Stiliyan Makarski (Bulgaria) Linda Zetchiri	(Moldova) Maxim Carpenco (Moldova) Nadejda Litvinenco
Mixed team	Bulgaria	Romania	Turkey

=== Medal table ===
* Host nation (Turkey)

Rank	Nation	Gold	Silver	Bronze	Total
1	Bulgaria	6	5	1	12
2	Romania	0	1	3	4
3	Turkey*	0	0	3	3
4	Greece	0	0	2	2
4	Moldova	0	0	2	2
Totals (5 entries)		6	6	11	23

== Team event ==
=== Round robin ===
Pos	Team	Pld	W	L	MF	MA	MD	Pts	Qualification
1	Bulgaria	5	5	0	24	1	+23	5	Champions
2	Romania	5	4	1	19	6	+13	4	Runners-up
3	Turkey (H)	5	3	2	12	13	−1	3	Third place
4	Moldova	5	2	3	9	16	−7	2	Fourth place
5	Greece	5	1	4	7	18	−11	1	Fifth place
6	Serbia and Montenegro	5	0	5	1	24	−23	0	Sixth place

Source: Badminton savez Srbije
(H) Host

=== Fixtures ===
Team 1	Score	Team 2
Bulgaria	5–0	Romania
Bulgaria	5–0	Turkey
Bulgaria	5–0	Moldova
Bulgaria	5–0	Greece
Bulgaria	4–1	Serbia and Montenegro
Romania	4–1	Turkey
Romania	5–0	Moldova
Romania	5–0	Greece
Romania	5–0	Serbia and Montenegro
Turkey	3–2	Moldova
Turkey	3–2	Greece
Turkey	5–0	Serbia and Montenegro
Moldova	3–2	Greece
Moldova	5–0	Serbia and Montenegro
Greece	5–0	Serbia and Montenegro
