= Serbia national badminton team =

National badminton team representing Serbia

Serbia
- Association: Badminton Savez Srbije (BSS)
- Confederation: BE (Europe)
- President: Radomir Jovović

BWF ranking
- Current ranking: 87 ▼5 (2 January 2024)
- Highest ranking: 62 (3 January 2023)

The Serbia national badminton team (Serbian: Репрезентација Србије у бадминтону, romanized: Reprezentacija Srbije u badmintonu) represents Serbia in international badminton team competitions. The Badminton Association of Serbia organizes any event or national event in the national team. The men's and women's team participate in the European meet. The Serbian team also competes in the Mediterranean Games.

The Serbian team has competed in the Balkan Badminton Championships since 1995 when it was still participating as Serbia and Montenegro. After the country gained independence in 2006, Serbia won bronze multiple times in the Balkan Badminton Championships. Serbia also made history by hosting the European Junior Badminton Championships for the first time in 2022.

The Serbian junior team finished as semi-finalists at the 2011 U19 Balkan Badminton Championships.

== History ==
Badminton in Serbia has been played since the 1990s. The national team was then managed by Badminton Savez Jugoslavije. The Badminton Association of Serbia was formed on 28 December 1998 and Serbian players then competed under the Serbia and Montenegro flag at international competitions. After Serbia gained independence in 2006, the Serbian team continued to compete in the Balkan Badminton Championships and entered the semi-finals multiple times.

=== Mixed team ===
Serbia competed in the Balkan Badminton Championships mixed team event in 2007. The team first lost 5–0 to Turkey and Romania. The team then performed an upsetting 3–2 win against Bulgaria but lost 3–2 to Greece in their final match to claim 5th place. In the 2009 Balkan Badminton Championships, the Serbian team lost in the semi-finals to Turkey but won 5–0 against North Macedonia in the bronze medal tie. Serbia then competed in the 2018 Balkan Badminton Championships but were eliminated in the semi-finals after losing 3–0 to Bulgaria.

== Competitive record ==
=== Thomas Cup ===
| Year | Round | Pos |
|---|---|---|
| 1949 to 1990 | Part of Yugoslavia | |
| 1992 to 2006 | Part of Serbia and Montenegro | |
| 2008 | Did not enter | |
| 2010 | Did not enter | |
| 2012 | Did not enter | |
| 2014 | Did not enter | |
| 2016 | Did not enter | |
| 2018 | Did not enter | |
| 2020 | Did not enter | |
| 2022 | Did not enter | |
| 2024 | Did not enter | |
| 2026 | To be determined | |
| 2028 | To be determined | |
| 2030 | To be determined | |

=== Uber Cup ===
| Year | Round | Pos |
|---|---|---|
| 1957 to 1990 | Part of Yugoslavia | |
| 1992 to 2006 | Part of Serbia and Montenegro | |
| 2008 | Did not enter | |
| 2010 | Did not enter | |
| 2012 | Did not enter | |
| 2014 | Did not enter | |
| 2016 | Did not enter | |
| 2018 | Did not enter | |
| 2020 | Did not enter | |
| 2022 | Did not enter | |
| 2024 | Did not enter | |
| 2026 | To be determined | |
| 2028 | To be determined | |
| 2030 | To be determined | |

=== Sudirman Cup ===
| Year | Round | Pos |
|---|---|---|
| 1989 | Part of Yugoslavia | |
| 1991 | Part of Yugoslavia | |
| 1993 | Part of Serbia and Montenegro | |
| 1995 | Part of Serbia and Montenegro | |
| 1997 | Part of Serbia and Montenegro | |
| 1999 | Part of Serbia and Montenegro | |
| 2001 | Part of Serbia and Montenegro | |
| 2003 | Part of Serbia and Montenegro | |
| 2005 | Part of Serbia and Montenegro | |
| 2007 | Did not enter | |
| 2009 | Did not enter | |
| 2011 | Did not enter | |
| 2013 | Did not enter | |
| 2015 | Did not enter | |
| 2017 | Did not enter | |
| 2019 | Did not enter | |
| 2021 | Did not enter | |
| 2023 | Did not enter | |
| 2025 | Did not enter | |
| 2027 | To be determined | |
| 2029 | To be determined | |

=== European Team Championships ===
==== Men's team ====
| Year | Round | Pos |
|---|---|---|
| 2006 | Part of Serbia and Montenegro | |
| 2008 | Did not enter | |
| 2010 | Did not enter | |
| 2012 | Did not enter | |
| 2014 | Did not enter | |
| 2016 | Did not enter | |
| 2018 | Did not enter | |
| 2020 | Did not enter | |
| 2024 | Did not enter | |
| 2026 | To be determined | |
| 2028 | To be determined | |
| 2030 | To be determined | |

==== Women's team ====
| Year | Round | Pos |
|---|---|---|
| 2006 | Part of Serbia and Montenegro | |
| 2008 | Did not enter | |
| 2010 | Did not enter | |
| 2012 | Did not enter | |
| 2014 | Did not enter | |
| 2016 | Did not enter | |
| 2018 | Did not enter | |
| 2020 | Did not enter | |
| 2024 | Did not enter | |
| 2026 | To be determined | |
| 2028 | To be determined | |
| 2030 | To be determined | |

==== Mixed team ====
| Year | Round | Pos |
|---|---|---|
| 1972 to 1992 | Part of Yugoslavia | |
| 1994 to 2006 | Part of Serbia and Montenegro | |
| 2008 | Did not enter | |
| 2009 | Did not enter | |
| 2011 | Did not enter | |
| 2013 | Did not enter | |
| 2015 | Did not enter | |
| 2017 | Did not enter | |
| 2019 | Did not enter | |
| 2021 | Did not enter | |
| 2023 | Did not enter | |
| 2025 | Did not enter | |
| 2027 | To be determined | |
| 2029 | To be determined | |

=== Balkan Badminton Championships ===
==== Mixed team ====
| Year | Round | Pos |
|---|---|---|
| 1992 to 2005 | Part of Serbia and Montenegro | |
| 2006 | Group stage | 5th |
| 2007 | Group stage | 5th |
| 2008 | Group stage | 6th |
| 2009 | Semi-finals | 3rd |
| 2010 | Group stage | 5th |
| 2011 | Semi-finals | 4th |
| 2012 | Group stage | 5th |
| 2013 | Semi-finals | 3rd |
| 2014 | Did not enter | |
| 2016 | Third place | 3rd |
| 2018 | Semi-finals | 3rd |

**Red border color indicates tournament was held on home soil.

== Junior competitive record ==
=== Suhandinata Cup ===
| Year | Round | Pos |
|---|---|---|
| 2000 | Part of Serbia and Montenegro | |
| 2002 | Part of Serbia and Montenegro | |
| 2004 | Part of Serbia and Montenegro | |
| 2006 | Did not enter | |
| 2007 | Did not enter | |
| 2008 | Did not enter | |
| 2009 | Did not enter | |
| 2010 | Did not enter | |
| 2011 | Did not enter | |
| 2012 | Did not enter | |
| 2013 | Did not enter | |
| 2014 | Did not enter | |
| 2015 | Did not enter | |
| 2016 | Did not enter | |
| 2017 | Did not enter | |
| 2018 | Did not enter | |
| 2019 | Did not enter | |
| 2022 | Did not enter | |
| 2023 | Did not enter | |
| 2024 | Did not enter | |
| 2025 | To be determined | |

=== European Junior Team Championships ===
==== Mixed team ====
| Year | Round | Pos |
|---|---|---|
| 1975 to 1991 | Part of Yugoslavia | |
| 1993 to 2018 | Part of Serbia and Montenegro | |
| 2020 | Quarter-finals | 5/8 |
| 2022 | Group stage | 9/16 |
| 2024 | Did not enter | |

=== Balkan Junior Team Championships ===
==== Mixed team ====
| Year | Round | Pos |
|---|---|---|
| 1992 to 2005 | Part of Serbia and Montenegro | |
| 2006 | Did not enter | |
| 2007 | Group stage | 5th |
| 2008 | Did not enter | |
| 2010 | Fourth place | 4th |
| 2011 | Semi-finals | 4th |
| 2012 | Did not enter | |
| 2013 | Did not enter | |
| 2015 | Semi-finals | 3rd |
| 2016 | Semi-finals | 3rd |
| 2017 | Semi-finals | 4th |
| 2019 | Runners-up | 2nd |

**Red border color indicates tournament was held on home soil.

== Players ==
=== Current squad ===
As of 2 January 2024

==== Men's team ====
| Name | DoB/Age | Ranking of event | | |
| Name | DoB/Age | MS | MD | XD |
|---|---|---|---|---|
| Borko Petrović | 22 June 1993 (aged 31) | 1188 | – | – |
| Sergej Lukić | 21 February 2003 (aged 22) | 1668 | – | – |
| Dragoslav Petrović | 23 June 1996 (aged 28) | 849 | – | – |
| Mihajlo Tomić | 17 February 2003 (aged 22) | – | – | 77 |
| Igor Bjelan | 9 August 1992 (aged 32) | – | – | – |
| Viktor Petrović | 10 March 2005 (aged 20) | 1728 | – | 1261 |
| Ilija Pavlović | 8 July 1992 (aged 32) | – | – | – |
| Đorđe Stepanović | 15 September 2001 (aged 23) | 1675 | – | – |

==== Women's team ====
| Name | DoB/Age | Ranking of event | | |
| Name | DoB/Age | WS | WD | XD |
|---|---|---|---|---|
| Marija Sudimac | 27 March 2002 (aged 23) | 257 | – | – |
| Sara Lončar | 20 September 2003 (aged 21) | 1087 | – | – |
| Sanja Perić | 16 January 2004 (aged 21) | 663 | – | – |
| Anđela Vitman | 3 May 2005 (aged 19) | – | – | 77 |
| Nina Bogdanović | 31 July 2005 (aged 19) | 1134 | – | 1261 |
| Maša Aleksić | 3 October 2006 (aged 18) | – | – | – |
| Miona Filipović | 30 October 2006 (aged 18) | – | – | – |
| Marija Samardžija | 17 April 2006 (aged 18) | – | – | – |
