= Émilie Lefel =

French badminton player (born 1988)

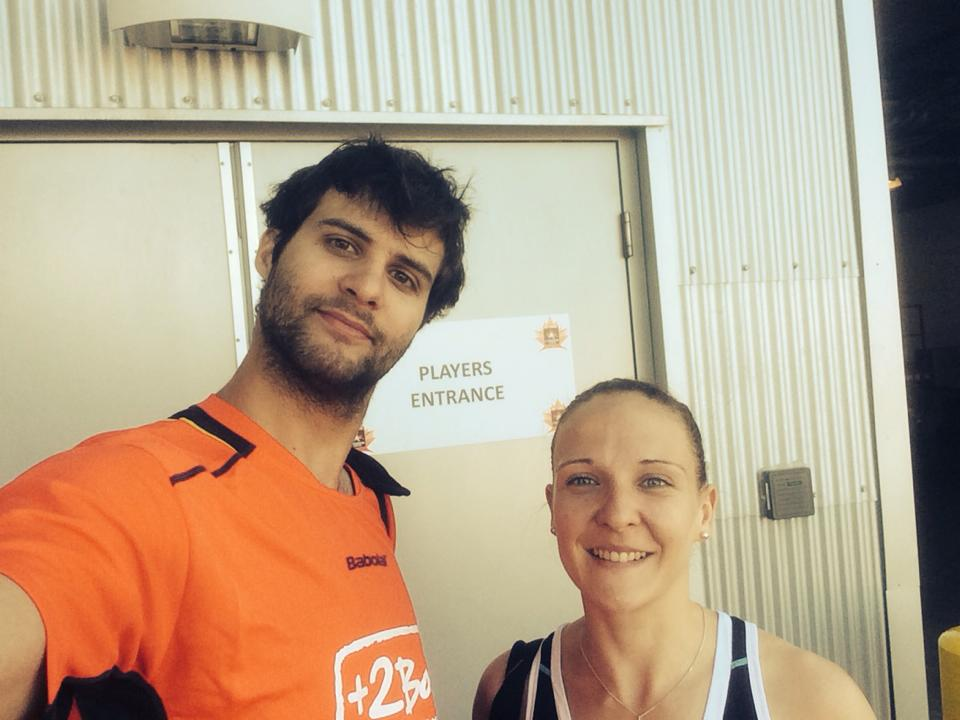
- Lefel (right) with her partner in mixed doubles, Ronan Labar

Personal information
- Born: 25 August 1988 (age 38) Lens, France
- Height: 1.65 m (5 ft 5 in)
- Weight: 57 kg (126 lb)

Sport
- Country: France
- Sport: Badminton
- Handedness: Left

Women's & mixed doubles
- Highest ranking: 18 (WD 19 March 2019); 20 (XD 15 October 2015)
- BWF profile
Medal record
Women's badminton
Representing France
European Mixed Team Championships
Silver medal – second place	2021 Vantaa	Mixed team
European Games
Bronze medal – third place	2019 Minsk	Women's doubles
European Championships
Silver medal – second place	2018 Huelva	Women's doubles
Mediterranean Games
Silver medal – second place	2013 Mersin	Women's doubles

Émilie Lefel (born 25 August 1988) is a French badminton player. In 2012, she won her first National Championships title in the women's doubles event with her partner Pi Hongyan.

== Achievements ==
=== European Games ===
Women's doubles
Year	Venue	Partner	Opponent	Score	Result
2019	Falcon Club, Minsk, Belarus	(France) Anne Tran	(United Kingdom) Chloe Birch (United Kingdom) Lauren Smith	13–21, 13–21	Bronze

=== European Championships ===
Women's doubles
Year	Venue	Partner	Opponent	Score	Result
2018	Palacio de los Deportes Carolina Marín, Huelva, Spain	(France) Anne Tran	(Bulgaria) Gabriela Stoeva (Bulgaria) Stefani Stoeva	12–21, 10–21	Silver

=== Mediterranean Games ===
Women's doubles

Year	Venue	Match	Partner	Opponent	Score	Result
2013	Mersin University Hall, Mersin, Turkey	1	(France) Audrey Fontaine	(Slovenia) Nika Končut (Slovenia) Maja Tvrdy	25–23, 21–12	Silver
2013	Mersin University Hall, Mersin, Turkey	2	(France) Audrey Fontaine	(Italy) Karin Maran (Italy) Xandra Stelling	21–12, 21–6	Silver
2013	Mersin University Hall, Mersin, Turkey	3	(France) Audrey Fontaine	(Turkey) Özge Bayrak (Turkey) Neslihan Yiğit	13–21, 11–21	Silver

=== BWF World Tour ===
The BWF World Tour, which was announced on 19 March 2017 and implemented in 2018, is a series of elite badminton tournaments sanctioned by the Badminton World Federation (BWF). The BWF World Tours are divided into levels of World Tour Finals, Super 1000, Super 750, Super 500, Super 300 (part of the HSBC World Tour), and the BWF Tour Super 100.

Women's doubles
Year	Tournament	Level	Partner	Opponent	Score	Result
2018	Scottish Open	Super 100	(France) Anne Tran	(Bulgaria) Gabriela Stoeva (Bulgaria) Stefani Stoeva	16–21, 9–21	(silver) Runner-up

=== BWF Grand Prix ===
The BWF Grand Prix had two levels, the Grand Prix and Grand Prix Gold. It was a series of badminton tournaments sanctioned by the Badminton World Federation (BWF) and played between 2007 and 2017.

Mixed doubles
Year	Tournament	Partner	Opponent	Score	Result
2015	Dutch Open	(France) Ronan Labar	(Thailand) Sudket Prapakamol (Thailand) Saralee Thungthongkam	21–10, 21–18	(gold) Winner
2015	Scottish Open	(France) Ronan Labar	(Russia) Vitalij Durkin (Russia) Nina Vislova	14–21, 12–21	(silver) Runner-up

BWF Grand Prix Gold tournament
BWF Grand Prix tournament

=== BWF International Challenge/Series ===
Women's doubles
Year	Tournament	Partner	Opponent	Score	Result
2012	Kharkiv International	(France) Audrey Fontaine	(Turkey) Özge Bayrak (Turkey) Neslihan Yiğit	21–11, 21–13	(gold) Winner
2012	Irish Open	(France) Audrey Fontaine	(Netherlands) Samantha Barning (Netherlands) Eefje Muskens	12–21, 8–21	(silver) Runner-up
2013	White Nights	(France) Audrey Fontaine	(Germany) Isabel Herttrich (Germany) Carla Nelte	20–22, 12–21	(silver) Runner-up
2015	Finnish Open	(France) Delphine Lansac	(England) Heather Olver (England) Lauren Smith	13–21, 21–23	(silver) Runner-up
2015	Peru International	(France) Delphine Lansac	(Turkey) Özge Bayrak (Turkey) Neslihan Yiğit	14–21, 21–14, 21–13	(gold) Winner
2015	Prague Open	(France) Marie Batomene	(Germany) Isabel Herttrich (Germany) Birgit Michels	13–21, 9–21	(silver) Runner-up
2016	Irish Open	(France) Anne Tran	(Denmark) Julie Finne-Ipsen (Denmark) Rikke Søby Hansen	24–22, 21–18	(gold) Winner
2017	Irish Open	(France) Anne Tran	(England) Jenny Moore (England) Victoria Williams	21–16, 21–12	(gold) Winner
2018	Czech Open	(France) Anne Tran	(England) Chloe Birch (England) Lauren Smith	14–21, 14–21	(silver) Runner-up
2019	Brazil International	(France) Anne Tran	(Canada) Rachel Honderich (Canada) Kristen Tsai	18–21, 21–17, 19–21	(silver) Runner-up
2019	Spanish International	(France) Anne Tran	(Bulgaria) Gabriela Stoeva (Bulgaria) Stefani Stoeva	8–21, 10–21	(silver) Runner-up

Mixed doubles
Year	Tournament	Partner	Opponent	Score	Result
2012	Spanish International	(France) Ronan Labar	(England) Marcus Ellis (England) Gabrielle White	9–21, 13–21	(silver) Runner-up
2012	Kharkiv International	(France) Gaëtan Mittelheisser	(Sweden) Nico Ruponen (Sweden) Amanda Högström	21–23, 21–10, 16–21	(silver) Runner-up
2013	Swiss International	(France) Ronan Labar	(Russia) Vitalij Durkin (Russia) Nina Vislova	14–21, 21–17, 18–21	(silver) Runner-up
2014	Swiss International	(France) Ronan Labar	(Russia) Vitalij Durkin (Russia) Nina Vislova	11–9, 11–7, 11–9	(gold) Winner
2014	Italian International	(France) Ronan Labar	(France) Gaëtan Mittelheisser (France) Audrey Fontaine	21–15, 21–14	(gold) Winner
2015	Peru International	(France) Ronan Labar	(France) Baptiste Carême (France) Anne Tran	21–18, 13–21, 21–14	(gold) Winner
2015	Guatemala International	(France) Ronan Labar	(Germany) Michael Fuchs (Germany) Birgit Michels	15–21, 16–21	(silver) Runner-up
2015	Welsh International	(France) Ronan Labar	(England) Matthew Nottingham (England) Emily Westwood	13–21, 23–25	(silver) Runner-up
2016	Spanish International	(France) Gaëtan Mittelheisser	(England) Ben Lane (England) Jessica Pugh	14–21, 21–15, 14–21	(silver) Runner-up

BWF International Challenge tournament
BWF International Series tournament
BWF Future Series tournament
