= Bosnia and Herzegovina national badminton team =

National badminton team representing Bosnia and Herzegovina

Bosnia and Herzegovina
- Association: Badminton Savez Bosne i Hercegovine (BSBiH)
- Confederation: BE (Europe)
- President: Brane Srdić

BWF ranking
- Current ranking: Unranked (2 January 2024)
- Highest ranking: 100 (4 July 2013)

The Bosnia and Herzegovina national badminton team (Bosnian: Reprezentacija Bosne i Hercegovine u badmintonu; Croatian: Reprezentacija Bosne i Hercegovine u badmintonu, Serbian: Репрезентација Босне и Херцеговине у бадминтону) represents Bosnia and Herzegovina in international badminton team competitions. It is controlled by the Badminton Association of Bosnia and Herzegovina, also known as BSBIH (Bosnian: Badminton savez Bosne i Hercegovine, Croatian: Badminton savez Bosne i Hercegovine, Serbian: Бадминтон савез Босне и Херцеговине). The Bosnian national team competes in the regional Balkan Badminton Championships.

The Bosnian team was ranked 101st on the BWF World Team Ranking in 2014.

== History ==
Badminton was first introduced to Bosnia and Herzegovina in the early 2000s. The city of Banja Luka is the first Bosnian city to host badminton competitions, with the first being in 2002. Soon after, many cities including Sarajevo formed their badminton clubs to compete in local championships.

== Junior competitive record ==
=== Balkan Junior Team Championships ===
==== Mixed team ====
===== U17 =====
Year	Result
(Serbia) 2014	Group stage
(Serbia) 2015	Group stage

===== U15 =====
Year	Result
(Serbia) 2013	Group stage

== Players ==
=== Current squad ===
As of 2 January 2024

==== Men's team ====
Name	DoB/Age	Ranking of event		
Name	DoB/Age	MS	MD	XD
Slobodan Stijaković	16 September 1995 (aged 30)	–	–	–
Miroslav Kočić	16 October 1993 (aged 31)	–	–	–
Marko Kočić	13 February 1995 (aged 30)	–	–	–

==== Women's team ====
Name	DoB/Age	Ranking of event		
Name	DoB/Age	WS	WD	XD
Milana Kozomara	11 November 1993 (aged 31)	–	–	–
Elena Kevac	10 May 1994 (aged 31)	–	–	–
Marija Papuga	25 October 2006 (aged 18)	–	–	–
