= Audrey Mittelheisser =

French badminton player (born 1992)

Personal information
- Born: 24 March 1992 (age 34) Rennes, France
- Height: 1.66 m (5 ft 5 in)
- Weight: 62 kg (137 lb)

Sport
- Country: France
- Sport: Badminton
- Handedness: Right

Women's doubles & mixed doubles
- Highest ranking: 38 (WD 11 July 2013); 22 (XD 28 June 2018)
- BWF profile
Medal record
Women's badminton
Representing France
European Games
Silver medal – second place	2015 Baku	Mixed doubles
European Championships
Bronze medal – third place	2017 Kolding	Mixed doubles
Mediterranean Games
Silver medal – second place	2013 Mersin	Women's doubles

Audrey Mittelheisser (née Fontaine; born 24 March 1992) is a French badminton player. She started playing badminton at age 9, and in 2010 she joined the France national badminton team. In 2012, she won the French National Badminton Championships in the mixed doubles event with her partner Baptiste Carême. In 2013, she won a silver medal at the Mediterranean Games in the women's doubles event. In 2015, she won a silver medal at the European Games in the mixed doubles event with Gaëtan Mittelheisser.

== Achievements ==
=== European Games ===
Mixed doubles
Year	Venue	Partner	Opponent	Score	Result
2015	Baku Sports Hall; Baku, Azerbaijan	(France) Gaëtan Mittelheisser	(Denmark) Niclas Nøhr (Denmark) Sara Thygesen	16–21, 16–21	Silver

=== European Championships ===
Mixed doubles
Year	Venue	Partner	Opponent	Score	Result
2017	Sydbank Arena; Kolding, Denmark	(France) Ronan Labar	(England) Chris Adcock (England) Gabby Adcock	14–21, 13–21	Bronze

=== Mediterranean Games ===
Women's doubles

Year	Venue	Match	Partner	Opponent	Score	Result
2013	Mersin University Hall, Mersin, Turkey	1	(France) Émilie Lefel	(Slovenia) Nika Končut (Slovenia) Maja Tvrdy	25–23, 21–12	Silver
2013	Mersin University Hall, Mersin, Turkey	2	(France) Émilie Lefel	(Italy) Karin Maran (Italy) Xandra Stelling	21–12, 21–6	Silver
2013	Mersin University Hall, Mersin, Turkey	3	(France) Émilie Lefel	(Turkey) Özge Bayrak (Turkey) Neslihan Yiğit	13–21, 11–21	Silver

=== BWF International Challenge/Series ===
Women's doubles
Year	Tournament	Partner	Opponent	Score	Result
2010	Turkey International	(France) Laura Choinet	(Russia) Anastasia Chervaykova (Russia) Maria Korobeyinkova	15–21, 11–21	(silver) Runner-up
2011	Swiss International	(France) Laura Choinet	(India) Pradnya Gadre (India) Prajakta Sawant	21–19, 10–21, 10–21	(silver) Runner-up
2012	Kharkiv International	(France) Émilie Lefel	(Turkey) Özge Bayrak (Turkey) Neslihan Yiğit	21–11, 21–13	(gold) Winner
2012	Irish Open	(France) Émilie Lefel	(Netherlands) Samantha Barning (Netherlands) Eefje Muskens	12–21, 8–21	(silver) Runner-up
2013	White Nights	(France) Émilie Lefel	(Germany) Isabel Herttrich (Germany) Carla Nelte	20–22, 12–21	(silver) Runner-up

Mixed doubles
Year	Tournament	Partner	Opponent	Score	Result
2011	White Nights	(France) Baptiste Carême	(Singapore) Danny Bawa Chrisnanta (Singapore) Vanessa Neo	18–21, 21–19, 15–21	(silver) Runner-up
2012	White Nights	(France) Baptiste Carême	(Poland) Wojciech Szkudlarczyk (Poland) Agnieszka Wojtkowska	21–17, 21–10	(gold) Winner
2014	Brazil International	(France) Gaëtan Mittelheisser	(France) Laurent Constantin (France) Laura Choinet	10–11, 11–5, 10–11, 7–11	(silver) Runner-up
2014	Italian International	(France) Gaëtan Mittelheisser	(France) Ronan Labar (France) Émilie Lefel	15–21, 14–21	(silver) Runner-up
2015	Finnish Open	(France) Gaëtan Mittelheisser	(Russia) Anatoliy Yartsev (Russia) Evgeniya Kosetskaya	16–21, 21–17, 10–21	(silver) Runner-up
2015	Kharkiv International	(France) Gaëtan Mittelheisser	(Poland) Robert Mateusiak (Poland) Nadieżda Zięba	14–21, 14–21	(silver) Runner-up
2016	Belgian International	(France) Ronan Labar	(Denmark) Alexander Bond (Denmark) Ditte Søby	21–19, 21–14	(gold) Winner
2018	Czech Open	(France) Ronan Labar	(Denmark) Jeppe Bay (Denmark) Ditte Søby	21–10, 12–21, 21–13	(gold) Winner

BWF International Challenge tournament
BWF International Series tournament
BWF Future Series tournament
