= Ronan Labar =

French badminton player (born 1989)

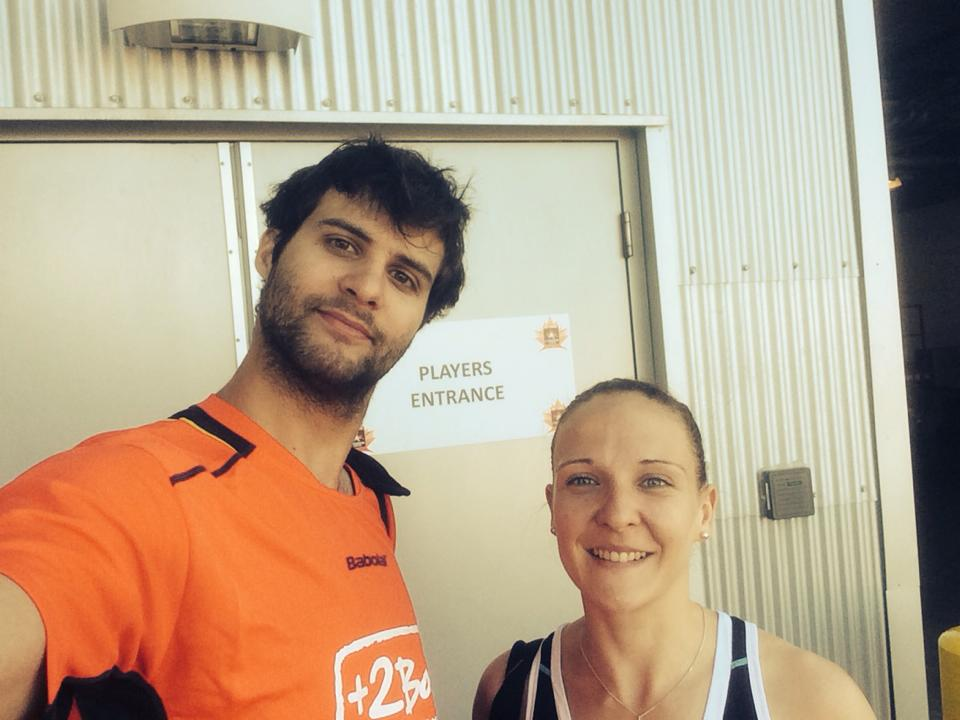
- Labar (left) with his partner in mixed doubles, Émilie Lefel

Personal information
- Born: 3 May 1989 (age 37) Châtenay-Malabry, France
- Years active: 2008–present
- Height: 1.91 m (6 ft 3 in)

Sport
- Country: France
- Sport: Badminton
- Handedness: Right

Men's & mixed doubles
- Highest ranking: 29 (MD with Baptiste Carême, 23 October 2014); 29 (MD with Lucas Corvée, 11 July 2023); 20 (XD with Émilie Lefel, 15 October 2015)
- Current ranking: 43 (MD with Lucas Corvée, 16 July 2024)
- BWF profile
Medal record
Men's badminton
Representing France
European Championships
Bronze medal – third place	2017 Kolding	Mixed doubles
European Men's Team Championships
Silver medal – second place	2016 Kazan	Men's team
Silver medal – second place	2024 Łódź	Men's team
Bronze medal – third place	2018 Kazan	Men's team
Bronze medal – third place	2020 Liévin	Men's team
European Mixed Team Championships
Silver medal – second place	2021 Vantaa	Mixed team
Silver medal – second place	2023 Aire-sur-la-Lys	Mixed team

Ronan Labar (born 3 May 1989) is a French badminton player. He won the French National Badminton Championships in the mixed doubles event in 2013, 2015 and 2017; also in the men's doubles event in 2014, 2015 and 2020.

== Achievements ==
=== European Championships ===
Mixed doubles
Year	Venue	Partner	Opponent	Score	Result
2017	Sydbank Arena; Kolding, Denmark	(France) Audrey Fontaine	(England) Chris Adcock (England) Gabby Adcock	14–21, 13–21	Bronze

=== BWF World Tour (1 runner-up) ===
The BWF World Tour, which was announced on 19 March 2017 and implemented in 2018, is a series of elite badminton tournaments sanctioned by the Badminton World Federation (BWF). The BWF World Tour is divided into levels of World Tour Finals, Super 1000, Super 750, Super 500, Super 300 (part of the HSBC World Tour), and the BWF Tour Super 100.

Mixed doubles
Year	Tournament	Level	Partner	Opponent	Score	Result
2019	Orléans Masters	Super 100	(France) Anne Tran	(France) Thom Gicquel (France) Delphine Delrue	11–21, 14–21	(silver) Runner-up

=== BWF Grand Prix (2 titles, 1 runner-up) ===
The BWF Grand Prix had two levels, the Grand Prix and Grand Prix Gold. It was a series of badminton tournaments sanctioned by the Badminton World Federation (BWF) and played between 2007 and 2017.

Men's doubles
Year	Tournament	Partner	Opponent	Score	Result
2014	Dutch Open	(France) Baptiste Carême	(Indonesia) Fran Kurniawan (Indonesia) Agripina Prima Rahmanto Putra	5–11, 11–10, 11–10, 11–7	(gold) Winner

Mixed doubles
Year	Tournament	Partner	Opponent	Score	Result
2015	Dutch Open	(France) Émilie Lefel	(Thailand) Sudket Prapakamol (Thailand) Saralee Thungthongkam	21–10, 21–18	(gold) Winner
2015	Scottish Open	(France) Émilie Lefel	(Russia) Vitalij Durkin (Russia) Nina Vislova	14–21, 12–21	(silver) Runner-up

BWF Grand Prix Gold tournament
BWF Grand Prix tournament

=== BWF International Challenge/Series (9 titles, 10 runners-up) ===
Men's doubles
Year	Tournament	Partner	Opponent	Score	Result
2012	White Nights	(France) Mathias Quéré	(France) Baptiste Carême (France) Gaëtan Mittelheisser	19–21, 19–21	(silver) Runner-up
2013	White Nights	(France) Baptiste Carême	(Russia) Andrey Ashmarin (Russia) Sergey Shumilkin	21–17, 21–16	(gold) Winner
2014	Swiss International	(France) Baptiste Carême	(Philippines) Peter Gabriel Magnaye (Philippines) Paul Jefferson Vivas	11–6, 9–11, 11–10, 6–11, 10–11	(silver) Runner-up
2018	Czech Open	(France) Thom Gicquel	(Poland) Miłosz Bochat (Poland) Adam Cwalina	21–18, 17–21, 21–15	(gold) Winner
2021	Austrian Open	(France) Lucas Corvée	(Malaysia) Junaidi Arif (Malaysia) Muhammad Haikal	17–21, 15–21	(silver) Runner-up
2021	Spanish International	(France) Lucas Corvée	(Malaysia) Man Wei Chong (Malaysia) Tee Kai Wun	15–21, 18–21	(silver) Runner-up
2021	Denmark Masters	(France) Lucas Corvée	(Denmark) Daniel Lundgaard (Denmark) Mathias Thyrri	22–24, 19–21	(silver) Runner-up
2024	Kazakhstan International	(France) Lucas Corvée	(Japan) Kakeru Kumagai (Japan) Hiroki Nishi	21–14, 21–19	(gold) Winner

Mixed doubles
Year	Tournament	Partner	Opponent	Score	Result
2012	Spanish International	(France) Émilie Lefel	(England) Marcus Ellis (England) Gabrielle White	9–21, 13–21	(silver) Runner-up
2013	Swiss International	(France) Émilie Lefel	(Russia) Vitalij Durkin (Russia) Nina Vislova	14–21, 21–17, 18–21	(silver) Runner-up
2014	Swiss International	(France) Émilie Lefel	(Russia) Vitalij Durkin (Russia) Nina Vislova	11–9, 11–7, 11–9	(gold) Winner
2014	Italian International	(France) Émilie Lefel	(France) Gaëtan Mittelheisser (France) Audrey Fontaine	21–15, 21–14	(gold) Winner
2015	Peru International	(France) Émilie Lefel	(France) Baptiste Carême (France) Anne Tran	21–18, 13–21, 21–14	(gold) Winner
2015	Guatemala International	(France) Émilie Lefel	(Germany) Michael Fuchs (Germany) Birgit Michels	15–21, 16–21	(silver) Runner-up
2015	Welsh International	(France) Émilie Lefel	(England) Matthew Nottingham (England) Emily Westwood	13–21, 23–25	(silver) Runner-up
2016	Belgian International	(France) Audrey Fontaine	(Denmark) Alexander Bond (Denmark) Ditte Søby Hansen	21–19, 21–14	(gold) Winner
2018	Czech Open	(France) Audrey Fontaine	(Denmark) Jeppe Bay (Denmark) Ditte Søby Hansen	21–10, 12–21, 21–13	(gold) Winner
2019	Denmark International	(France) Anne Tran	(France) Thom Gicquel (France) Delphine Delrue	19–21, 21–18, 21–15	(gold) Winner
2019	Irish Open	(France) Anne Tran	(Denmark) Mathias Christiansen (Denmark) Alexandra Bøje	12–21, 19–21	(silver) Runner-up

BWF International Challenge tournament
BWF International Series tournament
BWF Future Series tournament
