= 2006 Balkan Badminton Championships =

Tournament details
- Dates: 27–30 July
- Venue: Atatürk Sports Hall
- Location: İzmit, Turkey

The 2006 Balkan Badminton Championships (Turkish: Balkan Büyükler Badminton Şampiyonası 2006) was a badminton tournament sanctioned by the Balkan Badminton Association and Badminton Europe. The individual and mixed team events were held from 27 to 30 July 2006.

The tournament was held at the Atatürk Sports Hall in İzmit, Turkey. Six countries took part in the championships. In the team event, Bulgaria finished in first place without losing a match while hosts Turkey finished in second place.

== Background ==
The tournament was originally scheduled to be held from 9 to 11 June in Galați, Romania but was later postponed and then scrapped by the Romanian Badminton Federation. İzmit was then chosen to replace Galați as the official host for the championships.

== Medal summary ==
=== Medalists ===
Event	Gold	Silver	Bronze
Men's singles	(Bulgaria) Georgi Petrov	(Bulgaria) Krasimir Jankov	(Turkey) Mehmet Tural
Men's singles	(Bulgaria) Georgi Petrov	(Bulgaria) Krasimir Jankov	(Bulgaria) Blagovest Kisyov
Women's singles	(Bulgaria) Diana Dimova	(Bulgaria) Maya Dobreva	(Bulgaria) Gabriela Banova
Women's singles	(Bulgaria) Diana Dimova	(Bulgaria) Maya Dobreva	(Turkey) Nursel Aydoğmuş
Men's doubles	(Bulgaria) Konstantin Dobrev (Bulgaria) Georgi Petrov	(Turkey) Ali Kaya (Turkey) Mehmet Tural	(Bulgaria) Blagovest Kisyov (Bulgaria) Radoslav Simeonov
Men's doubles	(Bulgaria) Konstantin Dobrev (Bulgaria) Georgi Petrov	(Turkey) Ali Kaya (Turkey) Mehmet Tural	(Romania) Robert Ciobotaru (Romania) George Constantinescu
Women's doubles	(Bulgaria) Diana Dimova (Bulgaria) Atanaska Spasova	(Bulgaria) Maya Dobreva (Bulgaria) Dimitria Popstoikova	(Turkey) Nursel Aydoğmuş (Turkey) Ezgi Epice
Women's doubles	(Bulgaria) Diana Dimova (Bulgaria) Atanaska Spasova	(Bulgaria) Maya Dobreva (Bulgaria) Dimitria Popstoikova	(Romania) Florentina Petre (Romania) Adina Posteucă
Mixed doubles	(Bulgaria) Stiliyan Makarski (Bulgaria) Diana Dimova	(Bulgaria) Konstantin Dobrev (Bulgaria) Maya Dobreva	(Moldova) Maxim Carpenco (Moldova) Nadejda Litvinenco
Mixed doubles	(Bulgaria) Stiliyan Makarski (Bulgaria) Diana Dimova	(Bulgaria) Konstantin Dobrev (Bulgaria) Maya Dobreva	(Turkey) Ali Kaya (Turkey) Nursel Aydoğmuş
Mixed team	Bulgaria; Konstantin Dobrev; Krasimir Jankov; Blagovest Kisyov; Georgi Petrov; Stiliyan Makarski; Radoslav Simeonov; Diana Dimova; Maya Dobreva; Dimitria Popstoikova; Atanaska Spasova	Turkey; Nuri Balkan; Hasan Hüseyin Durakcan; Ali Kaya; Murat Şen; Mustafa Yalvarıcı; Mehmet Tural; Nursel Aydoğmuş; Derya Çalımbay; Öznur Çalışkan; Ezgi Epice; Rabia Kemer; Nur Damia Özer	Moldova; Maxim Carpenco; Vladimir Cecoi; Alexander Morari; Igor Ursatii; Ecaterina Andronic; Natalia Coseli; Olga Cuzmenco; Nadejda Litvinenco

=== Medal table ===
* Host nation (Turkey)

Rank	Nation	Gold	Silver	Bronze	Total
1	Bulgaria	6	4	3	13
2	Turkey*	0	2	4	6
3	Moldova	0	0	2	2
3	Romania	0	0	2	2
Totals (4 entries)		6	6	11	23

== Team event ==
=== Round robin ===
Pos	Team	Pld	W	L	MF	MA	MD	Pts	Qualification
1	Bulgaria	4	4	0	20	0	+20	4	Champions
2	Turkey (H)	4	3	1	15	5	+10	3	Runners-up
3	Moldova	4	2	2	6	14	−8	2	Third place
4	Romania	4	1	3	7	13	−6	1	Fourth place
5	Serbia	4	0	4	2	18	−16	0	Fifth place

Source: Badminton savez Srbije
(H) Host

=== Fixtures ===
Team 1	Score	Team 2
Bulgaria	5–0	Moldova
Turkey	5–0	Serbia
Bulgaria	5–0	Romania
Turkey	5–0	Moldova
Romania	5–0	Serbia
Bulgaria	5–0	Serbia
Turkey	5–0	Romania
Moldova	3–2	Serbia
Romania	2–3	Moldova
Bulgaria	5–0	Turkey

=== Exhibition matches ===
Exhibition matches were played between Turkey's national backup squad and the teams of Romania, Moldova and Serbia.

Team 1	Score	Team 2
Romania	2–3	Turkey B
Moldova	0–5	Turkey B
Serbia	0–5	Turkey B
