= Moldova national badminton team =

National badminton team representing Moldova

Moldova
- Association: Federația Moldovenească de Badminton (MBF)
- Confederation: BE (Europe)
- President: Marian Stan

BWF ranking
- Current ranking: 108 ▼3 (January 2, 2024)
- Highest ranking: 71 (July 2, 2019)

The Moldova national badminton team (Romanian: Echipa Moldovenească de badminton;) represents Moldova in international badminton team competitions. It is controlled by the Moldovan Badminton Federation (MBF). The Moldovan junior badminton team competed in the BWF World Junior Championships in 2016 and finished in 50th place.

== History ==
Badminton was first introduced to Moldova in 1965 when several exchange students from Laos brought the sport to the country which soon attracted the attention of Moldovan professors who then initiated badminton training camps in Moldova. In the 1970s, more badminton schools were opened in Moldova and Moldovan badminton players started to compete in inter-republican badminton championships. The Moldovan badminton team were one of the few Soviet republics that competed in the USSR National Badminton Team Championships.

After the dissolution of the Soviet Union in 1991, the Moldovan Badminton Federation was later found in 1992 and the Moldovan team started to compete in international team events, one of which being the Balkan Badminton Championships.

=== Mixed team ===
Moldova competed in the 1999 Balkan Badminton Championships in Argostoli, Greece. In the mixed team event, the team placed third in the championships. In 2010, Moldova competed in the 2010 Balkan Badminton Championships. The team lost the third place tie to Romania. In the 2012 Balkan Badminton Championships, the team lost to Romania in the bronze medal tie for a second time to finish in fourth place.

The Moldovan team took part in the 2019 European Mixed Team Badminton Championships qualifiers. The team hosted the qualifiers and were grouped with Scotland, Ukraine and Russia. The team did not qualify after losing their matches against their opponents and finishing on the bottom of the group.

== Competitive record ==
=== Thomas Cup ===
Year	Round	Pos
1949 to 1990	Part of Soviet Union	
1992 to 1998	Did not enter	
2000	Did not qualify	
2002	Did not enter	
2004	Did not qualify	
2006	Did not enter	
2008	Did not enter	
2010	Did not enter	
2012	Did not enter	
2014	Did not enter	
2016	Did not enter	
2018	Did not enter	
2020	Did not enter	
2022	Did not enter	
2024	Did not enter	
2026	To be determined	
2028	To be determined	
2030	To be determined	

=== Uber Cup ===
Year	Round	Pos
1957 to 1990	Part of Soviet Union	
1992 to 2024	Did not enter	
2026	To be determined	
2028	To be determined	
2030	To be determined	

=== Sudirman Cup ===
Year	Round	Pos
1989	Part of Soviet Union	
1991 to 2025	Did not enter	
2027	To be determined	
2029	To be determined	

=== European Team Championships ===
==== Men's team ====
Year	Round	Pos
2006	Did not enter	
2008	Did not enter	
2010	Did not enter	
2012	Did not enter	
2014	Did not enter	
2016	Did not enter	
2018	Did not enter	
2020	Did not enter	
2024	Did not enter	
2026	To be determined	
2028	To be determined	
2030	To be determined	

==== Women's team ====
Year	Round	Pos
2006	Did not enter	
2008	Did not enter	
2010	Did not enter	
2012	Did not enter	
2014	Did not enter	
2016	Did not enter	
2018	Did not enter	
2020	Did not enter	
2024	Did not enter	
2026	To be determined	
2028	To be determined	
2030	To be determined	

==== Mixed team ====
Year	Round	Pos
1972 to 1990	Part of Soviet Union	
1992 to 2017	Did not enter	
2019	Did not qualify	
2021	Did not enter	
2023	Did not enter	
2025	Did not enter	
2027	To be determined	
2029	To be determined	

=== Balkan Badminton Championships ===
==== Mixed team ====
Year	Round	Pos
1992	Did not enter	
1993	Did not enter	
1995	Did not enter	
1997	Did not enter	
1998	Third place	3rd
1999	Third place	3rd
2000	Fifth place	5th
2001	Fifth place	5th
2002	Fifth place	5th
2003	Fourth place	4th
2004	Fourth place	4th
2005	Fourth place	4th
2006	Third place	3rd
2007	Did not enter	
2008	Group stage	5th
2009	Group stage	5th
2010	Fourth place	4th
2011	Did not enter	
2012	Fourth place	4th
2013	Group stage	7th
2014	Group stage	5th
2016	Fourth place	4th
2018	Group stage	5th

**Red border color indicates tournament was held on home soil.

== Junior competitive record ==
=== Suhandinata Cup ===
Year	Round	Pos
2000 to 2015	Did not enter	
2016	Group stage	50th
2017	Did not enter	
2018	Did not enter	
2019	Did not enter	
2022	Did not enter	
2023	Did not enter	
2024	Did not enter	
2025	To be determined	

=== European Junior Team Championships ===
==== Mixed team ====
Year	Round	Pos
1975 to 1991	Part of Soviet Union	
1993 to 2017	Did not enter	
2018	Group stage	17/24
2020	Did not enter	
2022	Did not enter	
2024	Did not enter	

=== Finlandia Cup ===
==== Mixed team ====
Year	Round	Pos
1984 to 1990	Part of Soviet Union	
1992	Did not enter	
1994	Did not enter	
1996	Did not enter	
1998	Group stage	18th
2000	Group stage	14th
2002	Did not enter	
2004	Group stage	18th
2006	Did not enter	

=== Balkan Junior Team Championships ===
==== Mixed team ====
Year	Round	Pos
1992	Did not enter	
1993	Did not enter	
1994	Did not enter	
1995	Did not enter	
1996	Did not enter	
1997	Did not enter	
1998	Fifth place	5th
1999	Third place	3rd
2000	Fourth place	4th
2001	Third place	3rd
2002	Third place	3rd
2004	Third place	3rd
2005	Third place	3rd
2006	Did not enter	
2007	Did not enter	
2008	Fifth place	5th
2010	Did not enter	
2011	Did not enter	
2012	Did not enter	
2013	Did not enter	
2015	Did not enter	
2016	Did not enter	
2017	Did not enter	
2019	Did not enter	

**Red border color indicates tournament was held on home soil.

== Players ==
=== Current squad ===
As of January 2, 2024

==== Men's team ====
Name	DoB/Age	Ranking of event		
Name	DoB/Age	MS	MD	XD
Vladimir Leadavschi	May 13, 1999 (age 25)	–	–	–
Vitalie Izbaş	April 13, 1998 (age 27)	–	–	–
Piotr Cunev	December 10, 2001 (age 23)	–	–	–
Cristian Savin	July 11, 2000 (age 24)	1735	–	–
Alexandr Ursatii	October 1, 1999 (age 25)	–	–	1129

==== Women's team ====
Name	DoB/Age	Ranking of event		
Name	DoB/Age	WS	WD	XD
Vlada Ginga	April 22, 2001 (age 23)	272	754	1129
Anna Cernetchi	September 18, 2000 (age 24)	–	–	–
Elena-Alexandra Diordiev	January 24, 2001 (age 24)	360	–	–
Paola Ginga	March 2, 2007 (age 18)	1102	754	–
Ecaterina Fedotcenco	May 24, 1990 (age 34)	–	–	–

=== Previous squads ===
==== European Team Championships ====
- Mixed team: 2019
