= North Macedonia national badminton team =

North Macedonia
- Association: Macedonian Badminton Federation (BFM)
- Confederation: BE (Europe)
- President: Dime Stefanovski

BWF ranking
- Current ranking: Unranked (2 January 2024)
- Highest ranking: 99 (2 January 2014)

The North Macedonia national badminton team (Macedonian: Репрезентацијата на Северна Македонија во бадминтон) represents North Macedonia in international badminton team competitions and is organized by the Badminton Federation of the Former Yugoslav Republic of Macedonia. The Macedonian team competes in the Balkan Badminton Championships. The Macedonian junior team first competed in the 2006 Balkan Junior Badminton Championships. The team then won bronze at the 2013 Balkan Junior Team Championships in Manisa, Turkey.

== History ==
The Macedonian national team was formed after the establishment of the Macedonian Badminton Federation in 2003. The team later became part of Badminton Europe and the Badminton World Federation. Badminton in Macedonia is limited due to the lack of gyms and courts. The national team competed in their first team tournament at the 2006 Balkan Badminton Championships mixed team event.

=== Mixed team ===
North Macedonia first competed in the 2006 Balkan Badminton Championships. In the mixed team event, the team lost the 5th place tie to Serbia and Montenegro. The team then competed in the 2009 Balkan Badminton Championships in Bulgaria but lost the bronze medal match to Serbia. North Macedonia then finished in 6th place at the 2010 Balkan Badminton Championships.

== Competitive record ==
=== Thomas Cup ===
Year	Result
(England) 1949	Part of Yugoslavia
(Colony of Singapore) 1952	Part of Yugoslavia
(Colony of Singapore) 1955	Part of Yugoslavia
(Colony of Singapore) 1958	Part of Yugoslavia
(Indonesia) 1961	Part of Yugoslavia
(Japan) 1964	Part of Yugoslavia
(Indonesia) 1967	Part of Yugoslavia
(Malaysia) 1970	Part of Yugoslavia
(Indonesia) 1973	Part of Yugoslavia
(Thailand) 1976	Part of Yugoslavia
(Indonesia) 1979	Part of Yugoslavia
(England) 1982	Part of Yugoslavia
(Malaysia) 1984	Part of Yugoslavia
(Indonesia) 1986	Part of Yugoslavia
(Malaysia) 1988	Part of Yugoslavia
(Japan) 1990	Part of Yugoslavia
(Malaysia) 1992	Did not enter
(Indonesia) 1994	Did not enter
(Hong Kong) 1996	Did not enter
(Hong Kong) 1998	Did not enter
(Malaysia) 2000	Did not enter
(China) 2002	Did not enter
(Indonesia) 2004	Did not enter
(Japan) 2006	Did not enter
(Indonesia) 2008	Did not enter
(Malaysia) 2010	Did not enter
(China) 2012	Did not enter
(India) 2014	Did not enter
(China) 2016	Did not enter
(Thailand) 2018	Did not enter
(Denmark) 2020	Did not enter
(Thailand) 2022	Did not enter
(China) 2024	TBD
(N/A) 2026	TBD
(N/A) 2028	TBD
(N/A) 2030	TBD

=== Uber Cup ===
Year	Result
(England) 1957	Part of Yugoslavia
(United States) 1960	Part of Yugoslavia
(United States) 1963	Part of Yugoslavia
(New Zealand) 1966	Part of Yugoslavia
(Japan) 1969	Part of Yugoslavia
(Japan) 1972	Part of Yugoslavia
(Indonesia) 1975	Part of Yugoslavia
(New Zealand) 1978	Part of Yugoslavia
(Japan) 1981	Part of Yugoslavia
(Malaysia) 1984	Part of Yugoslavia
(Indonesia) 1986	Part of Yugoslavia
(Malaysia) 1988	Part of Yugoslavia
(Japan) 1990	Part of Yugoslavia
(Malaysia) 1992	Did not enter
(Indonesia) 1994	Did not enter
(Hong Kong) 1996	Did not enter
(Hong Kong) 1998	Did not enter
(Malaysia) 2000	Did not enter
(China) 2002	Did not enter
(Indonesia) 2004	Did not enter
(Japan) 2006	Did not enter
(Indonesia) 2008	Did not enter
(Malaysia) 2010	Did not enter
(China) 2012	Did not enter
(India) 2014	Did not enter
(China) 2016	Did not enter
(Thailand) 2018	Did not enter
(Denmark) 2020	Did not enter
(Thailand) 2022	Did not enter
(China) 2024	TBD
(N/A) 2026	TBD
(N/A) 2028	TBD
(N/A) 2030	TBD

=== Sudirman Cup ===
Year	Result
(Indonesia) 1989	Part of Yugoslavia
(Denmark) 1991	Part of Yugoslavia
(England) 1993	Did not enter
(Switzerland) 1995	Did not enter
(Scotland) 1997	Did not enter
(Denmark) 1999	Did not enter
(Spain) 2001	Did not enter
(Netherlands) 2003	Did not enter
(China) 2005	Did not enter
(Scotland) 2007	Did not enter
(China) 2009	Did not enter
(China) 2011	Did not enter
(Malaysia) 2013	Did not enter
(China) 2015	Did not enter
(Australia) 2017	Did not enter
(China) 2019	Did not enter
(Finland) 2021	Did not enter
(China) 2023	Did not enter
(China) 2025	TBD
(N/A) 2027	TBD
(N/A) 2029	TBD

=== European Team Championships ===
==== Men's team ====
Year	Result
(Slovakia) 2004	Did not enter
(Greece) 2006	Did not enter
(Netherlands) 2008	Did not enter
(Poland) 2010	Did not enter
(Netherlands) 2012	Did not enter
(Switzerland) 2014	Did not enter
(Russia) 2016	Did not enter
(Russia) 2018	Did not enter
(France) 2020	Did not enter
(Poland) 2024	TBD

==== Women's team ====
Year	Result
(Slovakia) 2004	Did not enter
(Greece) 2006	Did not enter
(Netherlands) 2008	Did not enter
(Poland) 2010	Did not enter
(Netherlands) 2012	Did not enter
(Switzerland) 2014	Did not enter
(Russia) 2016	Did not enter
(Russia) 2018	Did not enter
(France) 2020	Did not enter
(Poland) 2024	TBD

==== Mixed team ====
Year	Result
(Sweden) 1972	Part of Yugoslavia
(Austria) 1974	Part of Yugoslavia
(Republic of Ireland) 1976	Part of Yugoslavia
(England) 1978	Part of Yugoslavia
(Netherlands) 1980	Part of Yugoslavia
(West Germany) 1982	Part of Yugoslavia
(England) 1984	Part of Yugoslavia
(Sweden) 1986	Part of Yugoslavia
(Norway) 1988	Part of Yugoslavia
(Soviet Union) 1990	Part of Yugoslavia
(Scotland) 1992	Did not enter
(Netherlands) 1994	Did not enter
(Denmark) 1996	Did not enter
(Bulgaria) 1998	Did not enter
(Scotland) 2000	Did not enter
(Sweden) 2002	Did not enter
(Switzerland) 2004	Did not enter
(Netherlands) 2006	Did not enter
(Denmark) 2008	Did not enter
(England) 2009	Did not enter
(Netherlands) 2011	Did not enter
(Russia) 2013	Did not enter
(Belgium) 2015	Did not enter
(Poland) 2017	Did not enter
(Denmark) 2019	Did not enter
(Finland) 2021	Did not enter
(France) 2023	Did not enter
(N/A) 2025	TBD

=== Helvetia Cup ===
Year	Result
(Switzerland) 1962	Part of Yugoslavia
(West Germany) 1963	Part of Yugoslavia
(Netherlands) 1964	Part of Yugoslavia
(Austria) 1965	Part of Yugoslavia
(Belgium) 1966	Part of Yugoslavia
(Switzerland) 1967	Part of Yugoslavia
(Norway) 1968	Part of Yugoslavia
(Czechoslovakia) 1969	Part of Yugoslavia
(West Germany) 1970	Part of Yugoslavia
(Netherlands) 1971	Part of Yugoslavia
(Austria) 1973	Part of Yugoslavia
(Belgium) 1975	Part of Yugoslavia
(Soviet Union) 1977	Part of Yugoslavia
(Austria) 1979	Part of Yugoslavia
(Norway) 1981	Part of Yugoslavia
(Switzerland) 1983	Part of Yugoslavia
(Poland) 1985	Part of Yugoslavia
(Northern Ireland) 1987	Part of Yugoslavia
(Hungary) 1989	Part of Yugoslavia
(Bulgaria) 1991	Part of Yugoslavia
(Austria) 1993	Did not enter
(Cyprus) 1995	Did not enter
(France) 1997	Did not enter
(Northern Ireland) 1999	Did not enter
(Czech Republic) 2001	Did not enter
(Portugal) 2003	Did not enter
(Cyprus) 2005	Did not enter
(Iceland) 2007	Did not enter

=== Balkan Badminton Championships ===
==== Mixed team ====
Year	Result
(Turkey) 1995	Did not enter
(Greece) 1996	Did not enter
(Serbia and Montenegro) 1997	Did not enter
(Turkey) 1998	Did not enter
(Greece) 1999	Did not enter
(Bulgaria) 2000	Did not enter
(Bulgaria) 2001	Did not enter
(Greece) 2002	Did not enter
(Romania) 2003	Did not enter
(Turkey) 2004	Did not enter
(Greece) 2005	Did not enter
(Turkey) 2006	Round robin − 6th
(Bulgaria) 2007	Did not enter
(Romania) 2008	Did not enter
(Bulgaria) 2009	Fourth place
(Bulgaria) 2010	Round robin − 6th
(Greece) 2011	Did not enter
(Bulgaria) 2012	Did not enter
(Bulgaria) 2014	Did not enter
(Romania) 2016	Did not enter
(Greece) 2018	Did not enter

**Red border color indicates tournament was held on home soil.

== Junior competitive record ==
=== Suhandinata Cup ===
Year	Result
(China) 2000	Did not enter
(South Africa) 2002	Did not enter
(Canada) 2004	Did not enter
(South Korea) 2006	Did not enter
(New Zealand) 2007	Did not enter
(India) 2008	Did not enter
(Malaysia) 2009	Did not enter
(Mexico) 2010	Did not enter
(Chinese Taipei) 2011	Did not enter
(Japan) 2012	Did not enter
(Thailand) 2013	Did not enter
(Malaysia) 2014	Did not enter
(Peru) 2015	Did not enter
(Spain) 2016	Did not enter
(Indonesia) 2017	Did not enter
(Canada) 2018	Did not enter
(Russia) 2019	Did not enter
(Spain) 2022	Did not enter
(United States) 2023	Did not enter
(N/A) 2024	TBD

=== European Junior Team Championships ===
==== Mixed team ====
Year	Result
(Denmark) 1975	Did not enter
(Malta) 1977	Did not enter
(West Germany) 1979	Did not enter
(Scotland) 1981	Did not enter
(Finland) 1983	Did not enter
(Austria) 1985	Did not enter
(Poland) 1987	Did not enter
(England) 1989	Did not enter
(Hungary) 1991	Did not enter
(Bulgaria) 1993	Did not enter
(Slovakia) 1995	Did not enter
(Czech Republic) 1997	Did not enter
(Scotland) 1999	Did not enter
(Poland) 2001	Did not enter
(Denmark) 2003	Did not enter
(Netherlands) 2005	Did not enter
(Germany) 2007	Did not enter
(Italy) 2009	Did not enter
(Finland) 2011	Did not enter
(Turkey) 2013	Did not enter
(Poland) 2015	Did not enter
(France) 2017	Did not enter
(Estonia) 2018	Did not enter
(Finland) 2020	Did not enter
(Serbia) 2022	Did not enter

=== Finlandia Cup ===
==== Mixed team ====
Year	Result
(Switzerland) 1984	Part of Yugoslavia
(Hungary) 1986	Part of Yugoslavia
(Wales) 1988	Part of Yugoslavia
(Austria) 1990	Part of Yugoslavia
(Czechoslovakia) 1992	Did not enter
(Czech Republic) 1994	Did not enter
(Portugal) 1996	Did not enter
(Finland) 1998	Did not enter
(Austria) 2000	Did not enter
(Slovenia) 2002	Did not enter
(Austria) 2004	Did not enter
(Slovakia) 2006	Did not enter

=== Balkan Junior Team Championships ===
==== Mixed team ====
Year	Result
(Bulgaria) 2006	Fourth place
(Turkey) 2007	Did not enter
(Turkey) 2008	Did not enter
(Greece) 2010	Did not enter
(Turkey) 2011	Did not enter
(Turkey) 2013	(bronze) Third place
(Turkey) 2015	Did not enter
(Greece) 2016	Did not enter
(Turkey) 2017	Did not enter
(Turkey) 2019	Group stage

**Red border color indicates tournament was held on home soil.

== Players ==
=== Current squad ===
As of 2 January 2024

==== Men's team ====
Name	DoB/Age	Ranking of event		
Name	DoB/Age	MS	MD	XD
Ivan Pejoski	26 December 2002 (age 22)	-	-	-
Leonid Stojanov	11 October 2002 (age 22)	-	-	-
Petar Zhivkovski	10 February 2000 (age 25)	-	-	-
Mario Djon	28 August 2006 (age 18)	-	-	-

==== Women's team ====
Name	DoB/Age	Ranking of event		
Name	DoB/Age	WS	WD	XD
Ina Stefanovska	26 August 1997 (age 27)	822	1026	-
Elena Risteska	21 July 2003 (age 21)	-	-	-
Ivana Risteska	4 July 2005 (age 19)	-	-	-
Neda Ilieva	29 October 2007 (age 17)	-	-	-
