= Özge Bayrak =

Turkish badminton player (born 1992)

Personal information
- Born: 14 February 1992 (age 34) Osmangazi, Bursa, Turkey
- Height: 1.64 m (5 ft 5 in)
- Weight: 61 kg (134 lb)

Sport
- Country: Turkey
- Sport: Badminton
- Coached by: Çağatay Taşdemir

Women's singles & doubles
- Highest ranking: 46 (WS 2 June 2016); 28 (WD with Neslihan Yiğit, 20 August 2015); 91 (XD with Emre Vural, 21 April 2011)
- Current ranking: 78 (WS, 14 April 2026)
- BWF profile
Medal record
Women's badminton
Representing Turkey
European Games
Bronze medal – third place	2015 Baku	Women's doubles
European Championships
Bronze medal – third place	2014 Kazan	Women's singles
European Women's Team Championships
Bronze medal – third place	2026 Istanbul	Women's team
Mediterranean Games
Gold medal – first place	2013 Mersin	Women's doubles
Silver medal – second place	2013 Mersin	Women's singles
Bronze medal – third place	2022 Oran	Women's singles
European Junior Championships
Bronze medal – third place	2011 Vantaa	Girls' singles

Özge Bayrak (born 14 February 1992) is a Turkish badminton player. She is coached by Çağatay Taşdemir at Egospor club of Ankara Metropolis Municipality. Currently, she is studying at Aksaray University.

She competed at various international tournaments in singles and doubles with her partner Neslihan Yiğit. At the 2013 Mediterranean Games held in Mersin, Turkey, she won the silver medal in the women's singles event, and the gold medal in the women's doubles event along with Neslihan Yiğit.

In August 2014, the National Olympic Committee of Turkey named her one of the sixteen "golden" sportspeople of Turkey, who have a great chance to win a medal at the 2016 Summer Olympics. The committee decided to back up those sportspeople. She won the bronze medal in the women's singles event at the 2014 European Championships in Kazan, Russia.

== Achievements ==
=== European Games ===
Women's doubles
Year	Venue	Partner	Opponent	Score	Result
2015	Baku Sports Hall; Baku, Azerbaijan	(Turkey) Neslihan Yiğit	(Bulgaria) Gabriela Stoeva (Bulgaria) Stefani Stoeva	14–21, 9–21	Bronze

=== European Championships ===
Women's singles
Year	Venue	Opponent	Score	Result	Ref.
2014	Gymnastics Center; Kazan, Russia	(Denmark) Anna Thea Madsen	10–21, 14–21	Bronze	

=== Mediterranean Games ===
Women's singles

Year	Venue	Opponent	Score	Result
2013	Mersin University Hall, Mersin, Turkey	(Turkey) Neslihan Yiğit	16–21, 13–21	Silver
2022	Multipurpose Omnisports Hall, Oued Tlélat, Algeria	(Spain) Beatriz Corrales	14–21, 22–24	Bronze

Women's doubles

Year	Venue	Match	Partner	Opponent	Score	Result
2013	Mersin University Hall, Mersin, Turkey	1	(Turkey) Neslihan Yiğit	(Italy) Karin Maran (Italy) Xandra Stelling	21–9, 21–11	Gold
2013	Mersin University Hall, Mersin, Turkey	2	(Turkey) Neslihan Yiğit	(Slovenia) Maja Tvrdy (Slovenia) Nika Končut	21–13, 21–16	Gold
2013	Mersin University Hall, Mersin, Turkey	3	(Turkey) Neslihan Yiğit	(France) Émilie Lefel (France) Audrey Fontaine	21–13, 21–11	Gold

=== European Junior Championships ===
Girls' singles
Year	Venue	Opponent	Score	Result	Ref.
2011	Energia Areena; Vantaa, Finland	(Spain) Carolina Marín	8–21, 15–21	Bronze	

=== BWF International Challenge/Series (21 titles, 34 runners-up) ===
Women's singles
Year	Tournament	Opponent	Score	Result
2010	Syria International	(Philippines) Malvinne Alcala	21–18, 21–16	(gold) Winner
2010	South Africa International	(Italy) Agnese Allegrini	21–14, 11–21, 10–21	(silver) Runner-up
2010	Bahrain International	(Greece) Anne Hald Jensen	15–21, 8–21	(silver) Runner-up
2011	Uganda International	(Portugal) Telma Santos	19–21, 21–19, 19–21	(silver) Runner-up
2011	Kenya International	(Turkey) Öznur Çalışkan	21–18, 21–11	(gold) Winner
2011	Turkiye Open	(Greece) Anne Hald Jensen	21–14, 9–21, 18–21	(silver) Runner-up
2011	Suriname International	(Turkey) Neslihan Yiğit	16–21, 21–23	(silver) Runner-up
2011	South Africa International	(Portugal) Telma Santos	21–19, 21–10	(gold) Winner
2012	Uganda International	(Switzerland) Jeanine Cicognini	14–21, 10–14 retired	(silver) Runner-up
2014	Croatian International	(Denmark) Mette Poulsen	25–23, 19–21, 16–21	(silver) Runner-up
2014	Bulgarian Eurasia Open	(Bulgaria) Petya Nedelcheva	8–11, 6–11, 7–11	(silver) Runner-up
2014	Kharkiv International	(Bulgaria) Linda Zetchiri	11–10, 5–11, 11–3, 8–11, 5–11	(silver) Runner-up
2014	Polish International	(England) Panuga Riou	9–11, 11–8, 6–11, 7–11	(silver) Runner-up
2014	Turkey International	(Turkey) Neslihan Yiğit	21–13, 14–21, 16–21	(silver) Runner-up
2015	Lagos International	(Czech Republic) Kristína Gavnholt	22–24, 21–18, 5–21	(silver) Runner-up
2016	Sydney International	(Thailand) Pornpawee Chochuwong	11–21, 21–14, 19–21	(silver) Runner-up
2015	Chile International Challenge	(Czech Republic) Kristína Gavnholt	21–15, 21–19	(gold) Winner
2016	Chile International	(Turkey) Neslihan Yiğit	21–18, 21–14	(gold) Winner
2017	Turkey International	(Turkey) Neslihan Yiğit	21–17, 21–17	(gold) Winner
2018	Bulgarian Open	(Turkey) Neslihan Yiğit	19–21, 10–21	(silver) Runner-up
2018	Kharkiv International	(Turkey) Aliye Demirbağ	20–22, 21–18, 21–14	(gold) Winner
2018	Turkey International	(China) Li Yun	21–19, 12–21, 21–17	(gold) Winner
2019	Lagos International	(Turkey) Neslihan Yiğit	16–21, 26–24, 13–21	(silver) Runner-up
2021	Bulgarian International	(India) Samiya Imad Farooqui	21–16, 20–22, 11–21	(silver) Runner-up
2023	Portugal International	(Turkey) Neslihan Yiğit	14–21, 12–21	(silver) Runner-up
2023	Czech Open	(Denmark) Frederikke Østergaard	18–21, 19–21	(silver) Runner-up
2025	Italian Open	(Bulgaria) Stefani Stoeva	21–15, 21–19	(gold) Winner
2025	Türkiye International	(Turkey) Ravza Bodur	21–23, 21–8, 21–13	(gold) Winner

Women's doubles
Year	Tournament	Partner	Opponent	Score	Result
2009	Turkey International	(Turkey) Li Shuang	(Sweden) Emelie Lennartsson (Sweden) Emma Wengberg	11–21, 9–21	(silver) Runner-up
2010	Slovenian International	(Turkey) Ebru Tunalı	(Poland) Natalia Pocztowiak (Croatia) Staša Poznanović	17–21, 11–21	(silver) Runner-up
2010	Syria International	(Turkey) Cemre Fere	(Turkey) Neslihan Kılıç (Turkey) Neslihan Yiğit	21–18, 13–21, 22–20	(gold) Winner
2010	South Africa International	(Turkey) Öznur Çalışkan	(South Africa) Michelle Edwards (South Africa) Annari Viljoen	21–12, 21–15	(gold) Winner
2011	Kenya International	(Turkey) Neslihan Yiğit	(South Africa) Michelle Edwards (South Africa) Annari Viljoen	21–15, 21–19	(gold) Winner
2011	Slovak Open	(Turkey) Neslihan Yiğit	(Netherlands) Selena Piek (Netherlands) Iris Tabeling	7–21, 9–21	(silver) Runner-up
2011	Suriname International	(Turkey) Neslihan Yiğit	(Suriname) Crystal Leefmans (Suriname) Rugshaar Ishaak	21–3, 21–7	(gold) Winner
2011	South Africa International	(Turkey) Neslihan Yiğit	(South Africa) Michelle Edwards (South Africa) Annari Viljoen	21–10, 21–15	(gold) Winner
2012	Uganda International	(Turkey) Neslihan Yiğit	(South Africa) Michelle Edwards (South Africa) Annari Viljoen	Walkover	(silver) Runner-up
2012	Kharkiv International	(Turkey) Neslihan Yiğit	(France) Audrey Fontaine (France) Émilie Lefel	11–21, 13–21	(silver) Runner-up
2012	Bulgarian Open	(Turkey) Neslihan Yiğit	(Bulgaria) Gabriela Stoeva (Bulgaria) Stefani Stoeva	9–21, 17–21	(silver) Runner-up
2012	Turkey International	(Turkey) Neslihan Yiğit	(Bulgaria) Gabriela Stoeva (Bulgaria) Stefani Stoeva	21–19, 14–21, 21–23	(silver) Runner-up
2013	Turkey International	(Turkey) Neslihan Yiğit	(Bulgaria) Gabriela Stoeva (Bulgaria) Stefani Stoeva	15–21, 8–21	(silver) Runner-up
2014	Iran Fajr International	(Turkey) Neslihan Yiğit	(Malaysia) Amelia Alicia Anscelly (Malaysia) Soong Fie Cho	11–21, 19–21	(silver) Runner-up
2014	Hellas International	(Turkey) Neslihan Yiğit	(Russia) Elena Komendrovskaja (Russia) Viktoriia Vorobeva	21–7, 21–14	(gold) Winner
2014	Bulgarian Eurasia Open	(Turkey) Neslihan Yiğit	(Bulgaria) Petya Nedelcheva (Bulgaria) Dimitria Popstoikova	11–5, 11–5, 8–11, 10–11, 11–7	(gold) Winner
2014	Bangladesh International	(Turkey) Neslihan Yiğit	(India) Pradnya Gadre (India) N. Sikki Reddy	10–21, 24–22, 16–21	(silver) Runner-up
2014	Turkey International	(Turkey) Neslihan Yiğit	(Bulgaria) Gabriela Stoeva (Bulgaria) Stefani Stoeva	11–21, 9–21	(silver) Runner-up
2015	Iran Fajr International	(Turkey) Neslihan Yiğit	(Malaysia) Joyce Choong (Malaysia) Yap Cheng Wen	21–19, 21–18	(gold) Winner
2015	Mercosul International	(Turkey) Neslihan Yiğit	(France) Laura Choinet (France) Teshana Vignes Waran	21–10, 21–11	(gold) Winner
2015	Peru International	(Turkey) Neslihan Yiğit	(France) Delphine Lansac (France) Émilie Lefel	21–14, 14–21, 13–21	(silver) Runner-up
2015	White Nights	(Turkey) Neslihan Yiğit	(Russia) Ekaterina Bolotova (Russia) Evgeniya Kosetskaya	22–20, 13–21, 15–21	(silver) Runner-up
2015	Lagos International	(Turkey) Neslihan Yiğit	(India) Pradnya Gadre (India) N. Sikki Reddy	19–21, 23–21, 15–21	(silver) Runner-up
2015	Mersin Turkey International	(Turkey) Neslihan Yiğit	(Bulgaria) Gabriela Stoeva (Bulgaria) Stefani Stoeva	19–21, 12–21	(silver) Runner-up
2016	Turkey International	(Turkey) Neslihan Yiğit	(Turkey) Kader İnal (Turkey) Fatma Nur Yavuz	21–14, 21–16	(gold) Winner
2017	Hellas Open	(Turkey) Cemre Fere	(Turkey) Bengisu Erçetin (Turkey) Nazlıcan İnci	24–26, 24–22, 21–19	(gold) Winner

Mixed doubles
Year	Tournament	Partner	Opponent	Score	Result
2010	Syria International	(Turkey) Emre Vural	(Sri Lanka) Lasitha Menaka (Sri Lanka) Renu Hettiarachchige	17–21, 19–21	(silver) Runner-up

BWF International Challenge tournament
BWF International Series tournament
BWF Future Series tournament

== See also ==
- Turkish women in sports
