= Hüseyin Oruç =

Turkish badminton player

Personal information
- Born: Bursa, Turkey

Sport
- Country: Turkey
- Sport: Badminton

Men's singles & doubles
- Highest ranking: 307 (MS 23 May 2013); 97 (MD 12 September 2013); 425 (XD 24 October 2013)
- BWF profile
Medal record
Men's badminton
Representing Turkey
Mediterranean Games
Silver medal – second place	2013 Mersin	Men's doubles

Hüseyin Oruç is a Turkish badminton player. He won the silver medal at the 2013 Mediterranean Games in the men's doubles event partnered with Emre Aslan. In 2012, he and Aslan also won the men's doubles title at the Iraq International tournament.

== Achievements ==
=== Mediterranean Games ===
Men's doubles
Year	Venue	Partner	Opponent	Score	Result
2013	Mersin University Hall, Mersin, Turkey	(Turkey) Emre Aslan	(Croatia) Zvonimir Đurkinjak (Croatia) Zvonimir Hölbling	15–21, 9–21	Silver

=== BWF International Challenge/Series ===
Men's doubles
Year	Tournament	Partner	Opponent	Score	Result
2012	Iraq International	(Turkey) Emre Aslan	(Turkey) Ramazan Öztürk (Turkey) Emre Vural	21–15, 23–21	(gold) Winner

BWF International Challenge tournament
BWF International Series tournament
BWF Future Series tournament
