= Emre Aslan =

Turkish badminton player

Sport
- Country: Turkey
- Sport: Badminton

Men's singles & doubles
- Highest ranking: 341 (MS 20 October 2011); 97 (MD 12 September 2013); 893 (XD 14 March 2013)
- BWF profile
Medal record
Men's badminton
Representing Turkey
Mediterranean Games
Silver medal – second place	Mersin 2013	Men's doubles

Emre Aslan is a Turkish badminton player. He won the silver medal at the 2013 Mediterranean Games in the men's doubles event partnered with Hüseyin Oruç. In 2012, he and Oruç also won the men's doubles title at the Iraq International tournament.

== Achievements ==
=== Mediterranean Games ===
Men's doubles
Year	Venue	Partner	Opponent	Score	Result
2013	Mersin University Hall, Mersin, Turkey	(Turkey) Hüseyin Oruç	(Croatia) Zvonimir Đurkinjak (Croatia) Zvonimir Hölbling	15–21, 9–21	Silver

=== BWF International Challenge/Series ===
Men's doubles
Year	Tournament	Partner	Opponent	Score	Result
2012	Iraq International	(Turkey) Hüseyin Oruç	(Turkey) Ramazan Öztürk (Turkey) Emre Vural	21–15, 23-21	(gold) Winner

BWF International Challenge tournament
BWF International Series tournament
BWF Future Series tournament
