= Ramazan Öztürk =

Turkish badminton player (born 1992)

Personal information
- Born: 19 March 1992 (age 34)

Sport
- Country: Turkey
- Sport: Badminton

Men's singles & doubles
- Highest ranking: 161 (MS 3 September 2015); 150 (MD 17 May 2012); 78 (XD 20 August 2015)
- BWF profile

Ramazan Öztürk (born 19 March 1992) is a Turkish badminton player.

== Achievements ==
=== BWF International Challenge/Series ===
Men's singles
Year	Tournament	Opponent	Score	Result
2015	Chile International	(Cuba) Osleni Guerrero	9–21, 15–21	(silver) Runner-up

Men's doubles
Year	Tournament	Partner	Opponent	Score	Result
2012	Iraq International	(Turkey) Emre Vural	(Turkey) Emre Aslan (Turkey) Hüseyin Oruç	15–21, 21–23	(silver) Runner-up

Mixed doubles
Year	Tournament	Partner	Opponent	Score	Result
2013	Romanian International	(Turkey) Neslihan Kılıç	(South Korea) Choi Sol-gyu (South Korea) Kim Hye-rin	16–21, 13–21	(silver) Runner-up
2015	Jamaica International	(Turkey) Neslihan Kılıç	(Guatemala) Jonathan Solís (Guatemala) Nikté Sotomayor	21–18, 21–12	(gold) Winner
2015	Giraldilla International	(Turkey) Neslihan Kılıç	(Peru) Mario Cuba (Peru) Katherine Winder	Walkover	(silver) Runner-up

BWF International Challenge tournament
BWF International Series tournament
BWF Future Series tournament
