= Emre Vural =

Turkish badminton player (born 1992)

Personal information
- Born: 1 January 1992 (age 34) İznik, Turkey
- Height: 1.81 m (5 ft 11 in)
- Weight: 78 kg (172 lb)

Sport
- Country: Turkey
- Sport: Badminton
- Coached by: Çağatay Taşdemir

Men's singles & doubles
- Highest ranking: 111 (MS 21 January 2016); 61 (MD 5 November 2015); 91 (XD 21 April 2011)
- BWF profile

Emre Vural (born 1 January 1992) is a Turkish badminton player. He competed at the 2015 European Games.

== Achievements ==
=== BWF International Challenge/Series ===
Men's singles

Year`	Tournament	Opponent	Score	Result
2015	Jamaica International	(Canada) Martin Giuffre	14–21, 16–21	(silver) Runner-up
2015	South Africa International	(United States) Howard Shu	11–21, 16–21	(silver) Runner-up

Men's doubles
Year	Tournament	Partner	Opponent	Score	Result
2012	Iraq International	(Turkey) Ramazan Öztürk	(Turkey) Emre Aslan (Turkey) Hüseyin Oruç	15–21, 21–23	(silver) Runner-up
2015	Peru International Series	(Turkey) Sinan Zorlu	(Brazil) Hugo Arthuso (Brazil) Daniel Paiola	21–14, 17–21, 21–19	(gold) Winner
2015	Jamaica International	(Turkey) Sinan Zorlu	(Guatemala) Rodolfo Ramírez (Guatemala) Jonathan Solís	21–18, 15–21, 12–21	(silver) Runner-up
2015	Ethiopia International	(Turkey) Sinan Zorlu	(South Africa) Andries Malan (South Africa) Willem Viljoen	10–21, 13–21	(silver) Runner-up
2015	Nigeria International	(Turkey) Sinan Zorlu	(Egypt) Ali Ahmed El-Khateeb (Egypt) Abdelrahman Kashkal	21–14, 21–19	(gold) Winner

Mixed doubles
Year	Tournament	Partner	Opponent	Score	Result
2010	Syria International	(Turkey) Özge Bayrak	(Sri Lanka) Lasitha Karunathilake (Sri Lanka) Chandrika de Silva	17–21, 19–21	(silver) Runner-up

BWF International Challenge tournament
BWF International Series tournament
BWF Future Series tournament
