= Neslihan Arın =

Turkish badminton player (born 1994)

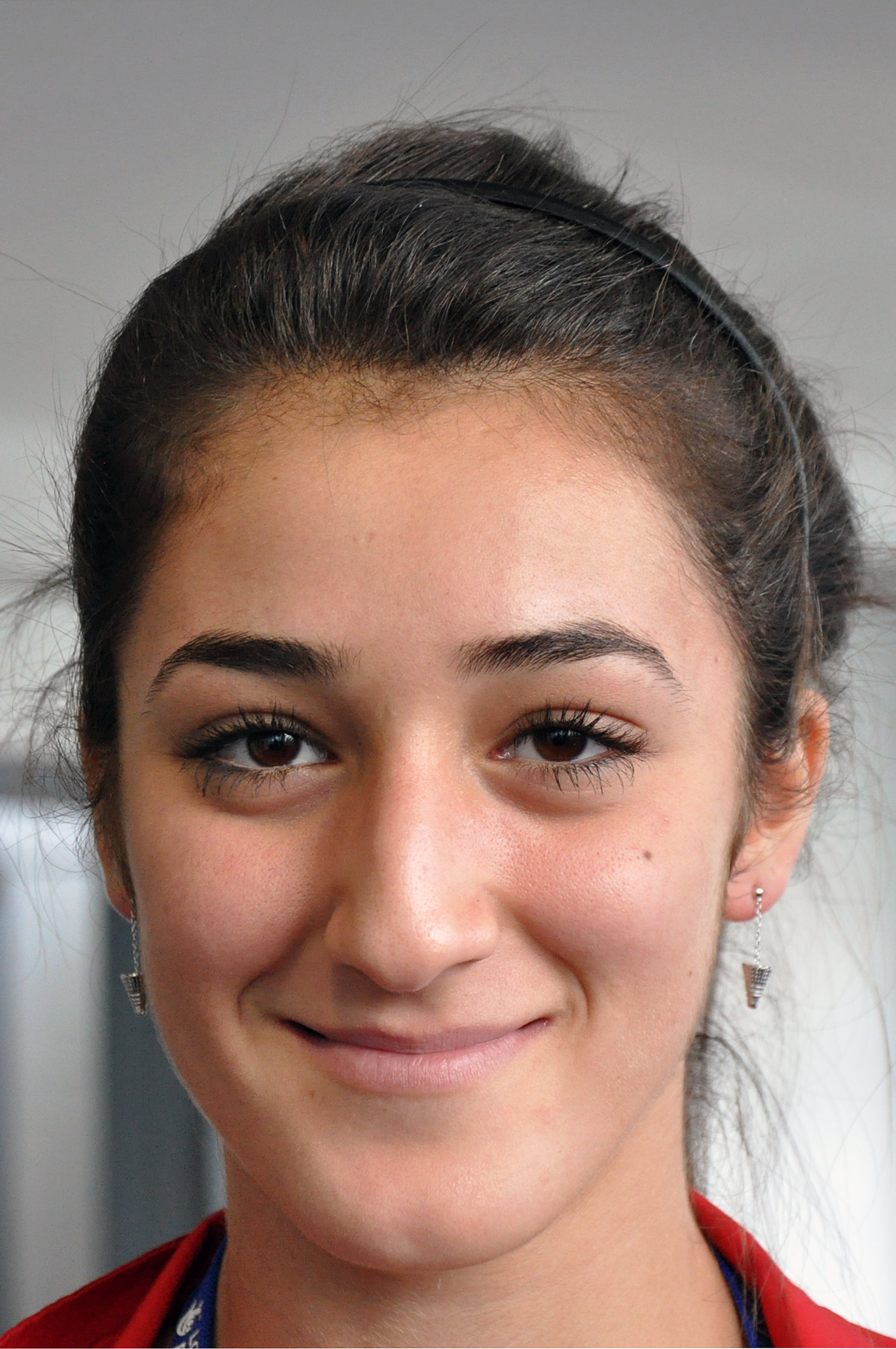
- Arın in 2011

Personal information
- Born: Neslihan Yiğit; 26 February 1994 (age 32) Bursa, Turkey
- Height: 1.80 m (5 ft 11 in)
- Weight: 64 kg (141 lb)

Sport
- Country: Turkey
- Sport: Badminton
- Handedness: Right
- Coached by: Hakan Arın

Women's singles & doubles
- Highest ranking: 27(WS, 3 May 2022); 28 (WD with Özge Bayrak, 20 August 2015)
- Current ranking: 34 (WS, 3 November 2026)
- BWF profile
Medal record
Women's badminton
Representing Turkey
European Games
Bronze medal – third place	2015 Baku	Women's doubles
European Championships
Bronze medal – third place	2021 Kyiv	Women's singles
Bronze medal – third place	2022 Madrid	Women's singles
Bronze medal – third place	2024 Saarbrücken	Women's singles
Bronze medal – third place	2026 Huelva	Women's singles
European Women's Team Championships
Bronze medal – third place	2026 Istanbul	Women's team
Islamic Solidarity Games
Gold medal – first place	2013 Palembang	Women's singles
Bronze medal – third place	2013 Palembang	Women's team
Mediterranean Games
Gold medal – first place	2013 Mersin	Women's singles
Gold medal – first place	2013 Mersin	Women's doubles
Gold medal – first place	2018 Tarragona	Women's singles
Gold medal – first place	2022 Oran	Women's singles
Gold medal – first place	2026 Taranto	Women's singles
European Junior Championships
Bronze medal – third place	2013 Ankara	Girls' singles

Neslihan Arın (née Yiğit; born 26 February 1994) is a Turkish badminton player. She won the women's singles title at the 2013 Islamic Solidarity Games; 2013, 2018, 2022, 2026 Mediterranean Games and the women's doubles title at the 2013 Mediterranean Games. Arın also won the bronze medals at the 2015 European Games and at the 2021, 2022, 2024 and 2026 European Championships

== Career ==
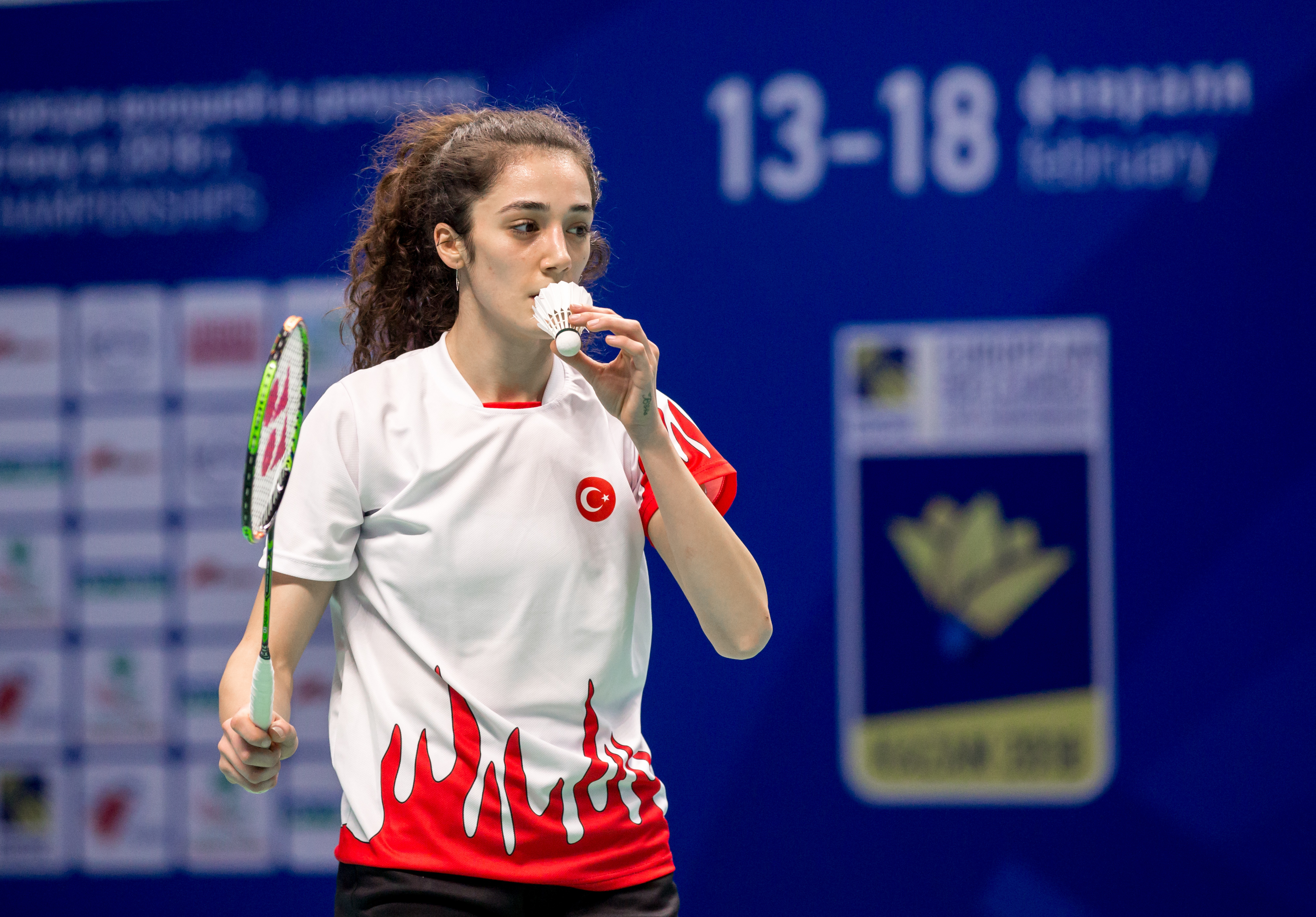
Arın at the 2018 European Team Championships

Neslihan Arın became silver medalist in singles and doubles at the U17 European Championship held 2009 in Medvode, Slovenia. At the 2011 Spanish Junior International, she reached to semi finals in singles, won the girls' doubles title, and became the runner-up in the mixed doubles.

She competed at various international tournaments in singles and doubles with her partner Özge Bayrak, and won titles in the years 2011–2012. The latest success enabled her to rise up to 28th place in the women's doubles world ranking list as of 20 August 2015 with Özge Bayrak. In the singles event, she reached a career-high of world number 34th in the world list on 1 October 2019. Arın ranked 7th in the World Juniors list.

She qualified as the first-ever Turkish badminton player for the Olympics.

She won the gold medal in the singles event and the bronze medal with the national team at the 2013 Islamic Solidarity Games held in Palembang, Indonesia. In June 2013, she won double gold medals in the women's singles and doubles event at the Mersin Mediterranean Games.

In 2021, Arın reached the quarter-finals of the Toyota Thailand Open, losing out to the eventual champion Carolina Marín. She won the bronze medal at the European Championships, defeated by the defending champion Marín in the semi-finals in straight games.

Arın was drawn in group A along with top seed and eventual champion Chen Yufei at the Tokyo Olympics, against whom she lost 14–21, 9–21. She won her other group game against Doha Hany 21–5, 21–5.

Arın reached the quarterfinals of the 2021 Hylo Open. After beating Aakarshi Kashyap and Kristin Kuuba in the first two rounds, it was the eventual champion Busanan Ongbamrungphan who stopped her in the quarters.

Arın made it to the quarter-finals at the 2021 Indonesia Masters She defeated 6th seed Michelle Li, and Marija Ulitina in straight games on the way. In the quarter-finals, She was stopped by P. V. Sindhu.

== Achievements ==
=== European Games ===
Women's doubles
Year	Venue	Partner	Opponent	Score	Result
2015	Baku Sports Hall; Baku, Azerbaijan	(Turkey) Özge Bayrak	(Bulgaria) Gabriela Stoeva (Bulgaria) Stefani Stoeva	14–21, 9–21	Bronze

=== European Championships ===
Women's singles
Year	Venue	Opponent	Score	Result
2021	Palace of Sports; Kyiv, Ukraine	(Spain) Carolina Marín	18–21, 9–21	Bronze
2022	Polideportivo Municipal Gallur; Madrid, Spain	(Spain) Carolina Marín	14–21, 13–21	Bronze
2024	Saarlandhalle; Saarbrücken, Germany	(Scotland) Kirsty Gilmour	18–21, 13–21	Bronze
2026	Palacio de los Deportes Carolina Marín; Huelva, Spain	(Scotland) Kirsty Gilmour	21–16, 14–21, 11–21	Bronze

=== Islamic Solidarity Games ===
Women's singles
Year	Venue	Opponent	Score	Result
2013	Dempo Sports Hall; Palembang, Indonesia	(Malaysia) Lim Yin Fun	21–13, 21–19	Gold

=== Mediterranean Games ===
Women's singles
Year	Venue	Opponent	Score	Result
2013	Mersin University Hall; Mersin, Turkey	(Turkey) Özge Bayrak	21–16, 21–13	Gold
2018	El Morell Pavilion; Tarragona, Spain	(Spain) Beatriz Corrales	21–19, 23–21	Gold
2022	Multipurpose Omnisports Hall; Oued Tlélat, Algeria	(Spain) Beatriz Corrales	21–14, 21–11	Gold

Women's doubles

Year	Venue	Match	Partner	Opponent	Score	Result
2013	Mersin University Hall, Mersin, Turkey	1	(Turkey) Özge Bayrak	(Italy) Karin Maran (Italy) Xandra Stelling	21–9, 21–11	Gold
2013	Mersin University Hall, Mersin, Turkey	2	(Turkey) Özge Bayrak	(Slovenia) Nika Končut (Slovenia) Maja Tvrdy	21–13, 21–16	Gold
2013	Mersin University Hall, Mersin, Turkey	3	(Turkey) Özge Bayrak	(France) Audrey Fontaine (France) Émilie Lefel	21–13, 21–11	Gold

=== European University Games ===
Women's singles
Year	Venue	Opponent	Score	Result
2014	Rotterdam, Netherlands	(Russia) Anastasia Chervyakova	21–9, 23–25, 21–19	Gold

=== European University Championships ===
Women's singles
Year	Venue	Opponent	Score	Result
2015	Warsaw, Poland	(Turkey) Özge Bayrak	18–21, 21–19, 18–21	Silver

Women's doubles
Year	Venue	Partner	Opponent	Score	Result
2015	Warsaw, Poland	(Turkey) Özge Bayrak	(France) Delphine Delrue (France) Lauranne Rosello	21–15, 21–10	Gold

=== European Junior Championships ===
Girls' singles
Year	Venue	Opponent	Score	Result
2013	ASKI Sport Hall; Ankara, Turkey	(Denmark) Line Kjaersfeldt	14–21, 8–21	Bronze

=== BWF World Tour (1 runner-up) ===
The BWF World Tour, which was announced on 19 March 2017 and implemented in 2018, is a series of elite badminton tournaments sanctioned by the Badminton World Federation (BWF). The BWF World Tours are divided into levels of World Tour Finals, Super 1000, Super 750, Super 500, Super 300, and the BWF Tour Super 100.

Women's singles
Year	Tournament	Level	Opponent	Score	Result	Ref.
2025	Syed Modi International	Super 300	(Japan) Hina Akechi	16–21, 14–21	(silver) Runner-up	

=== BWF International Challenge/Series (32 titles, 31 runners-up) ===
Women's singles
Year	Tournament	Opponent	Score	Result
2011	Bulgarian International	(Bulgaria) Linda Zetchiri	18–21, 14–21	(silver) Runner-up
2011	Suriname International	(Turkey) Özge Bayrak	21–16, 23–21	(gold) Winner
2012	Iran Fajr International	(Japan) Yu Wakita	21–16, 21–14	(gold) Winner
2012	Croatian International	(Japan) Kana Ito	18–21, 15–21	(silver) Runner-up
2012	Polish Open	(Japan) Ai Goto	9–21, 21–12, 7–21	(silver) Runner-up
2013	Iran Fajr International	(Indonesia) Febby Angguni	21–15, 21–14	(gold) Winner
2013	Turkey International	(Bulgaria) Stefani Stoeva	21–14, 16–21, 19–21	(silver) Runner-up
2014	Bangladesh International	(Malaysia) Yap Rui Chen	21–18, 21–12	(gold) Winner
2014	Turkey International	(Turkey) Özge Bayrak	13–21, 21–14, 21–16	(gold) Winner
2015	Iran Fajr International	(Bulgaria) Linda Zetchiri	19–21, 14–21	(silver) Runner-up
2015	Peru International	(United States) Rong Schafer	17–21, 16–21	(silver) Runner-up
2016	Brazil International	(Japan) Chisato Hoshi	21–13, 21–15	(gold) Winner
2016	Polish Open	(France) Delphine Lansac	19–21, 11–21	(silver) Runner-up
2016	Chile International	(Turkey) Özge Bayrak	18–21, 14–21	(silver) Runner-up
2016	White Nights	(Japan) Mako Urushizaki	21–16, 21–15	(gold) Winner
2017	White Nights	(Russia) Evgeniya Kosetskaya	8–21, 21–15, 20–22	(silver) Runner-up
2017	Bulgarian Open	(Germany) Luise Heim	21–17, 14–21, 21–17	(gold) Winner
2017	Hellas Open	(Bulgaria) Mariya Mitsova	21–14, 17–21, 21–15	(gold) Winner
2017	Czech Open	(Japan) Kaho Funahashi	21–16, 14–21, 21–17	(gold) Winner
2017	Hungarian International	(Turkey) Aliye Demirbağ	21–11, 17–21, 21–18	(gold) Winner
2017	Turkey International	(Turkey) Özge Bayrak	17–21, 17–21	(silver) Runner-up
2018	Bulgarian Open	(Turkey) Özge Bayrak	21–19, 21–10	(gold) Winner
2018	Czech Open	(Germany) Yvonne Li	17–21, 8–21	(silver) Runner-up
2018	Hungarian International	(Bulgaria) Mariya Mitsova	21–14, 21–8	(gold) Winner
2019	Lagos International	(Turkey) Özge Bayrak	21–16, 24–26, 21–13	(gold) Winner
2019	Bulgarian Open	(Bulgaria) Mariya Mitsova	21–9, 21–14	(gold) Winner
2019	Kharkiv International	(France) Qi Xuefei	18–21, 21–19, 16–21	(silver) Runner-up
2019	Belgian International	(Denmark) Line Christophersen	21–23, 21–12, 11–21	(silver) Runner-up
2019	Hungarian International	(Vietnam) Nguyễn Thùy Linh	21–16, 12–21, 21–18	(gold) Winner
2019	Turkey Open	(Turkey) Aliye Demirbağ	21–14, 22–20	(gold) Winner
2023	Uganda International	(Malaysia) Letshanaa Karupathevan	11–21, 8–21	(silver) Runner-up
2023	Portugal International	(Turkey) Özge Bayrak	21–14, 21–12	(gold) Winner
2023	Polish Open	(Singapore) Yeo Jia Min	13–21, 11–21	(silver) Runner-up
2023	Slovenia Open	(Chinese Taipei) Huang Yu-hsun	17–21, 17–21	(silver) Runner-up
2023	Belgian International	(Denmark) Line Christophersen	21–11, 14–21, 21–17	(gold) Winner
2023	Scottish Open	(Estonia) Kristin Kuuba	25–23, 21–13	(gold) Winner
2025	Swedish Open	(France) Léonice Huet	21–14, 24–22	(gold) Winner
2025	Iran Fajr International	(Azerbaijan) Keisha Fatimah Azzahra	21–17, 21–14	(gold) Winner
2025	Uganda International	(United States) Ishika Jaiswal	15–21, 21–19, 20–22	(silver) Runner-up
2025	Polish Open	(Chinese Taipei) Hung Yi-ting	21–13, 21–16	(gold) Winner
2025	Turkey International	(Japan) Nanami Someya	21–7, 21–4	(gold) Winner

Women's doubles
Year	Tournament	Partner	Opponent	Score	Result
2010	Syria International	(Turkey) Neslihan Kılıç	(Turkey) Cemre Fere (Turkey) Özge Bayrak	18–21, 21–13, 20–22	(silver) Runner-up
2011	Kenya International	(Turkey) Özge Bayrak	(South Africa) Michelle Edwards (South Africa) Annari Viljoen	21–15, 21–19	(gold) Winner
2011	Slovak Open	(Turkey) Özge Bayrak	(Netherlands) Selena Piek (Netherlands) Iris Tabeling	7–21, 9–21	(silver) Runner-up
2011	Suriname International	(Turkey) Özge Bayrak	(Suriname) Crystal Leefmans (Suriname) Rugshaar Ishaak	21–3, 21–7	(gold) Winner
2011	South Africa International	(Turkey) Özge Bayrak	(South Africa) Michelle Edwards (South Africa) Annari Viljoen	21–10, 21–15	(gold) Winner
2012	Uganda International	(Turkey) Özge Bayrak	(South Africa) Michelle Edwards (South Africa) Annari Viljoen	Walkover	(silver) Runner-up
2012	Kharkiv International	(Turkey) Özge Bayrak	(France) Audrey Fontaine (France) Émilie Lefel	11–21, 13–21	(silver) Runner-up
2012	Bulgarian International	(Turkey) Özge Bayrak	(Bulgaria) Gabriela Stoeva (Bulgaria) Stefani Stoeva	9–21, 17–21	(silver) Runner-up
2012	Turkey International	(Turkey) Özge Bayrak	(Bulgaria) Gabriela Stoeva (Bulgaria) Stefani Stoeva	21–19, 14–21, 21–23	(silver) Runner-up
2013	Turkey International	(Turkey) Özge Bayrak	(Bulgaria) Gabriela Stoeva (Bulgaria) Stefani Stoeva	15–21, 8–21	(silver) Runner-up
2014	Iran Fajr International	(Turkey) Özge Bayrak	(Malaysia) Amelia Alicia Anscelly (Malaysia) Soong Fie Cho	11–21, 19–21	(silver) Runner-up
2014	Hellas International	(Turkey) Özge Bayrak	(Russia) Elena Komendrovskaja (Russia) Viktoriia Vorobeva	21–7, 21–14	(gold) Winner
2014	Bulgarian Eurasia Open	(Turkey) Özge Bayrak	(Bulgaria) Petya Nedelcheva (Bulgaria) Dimitria Popstoikova	11–5, 11–5, 8–11, 10–11, 11–7	(gold) Winner
2014	Bangladesh International	(Turkey) Özge Bayrak	(India) Pradnya Gadre (India) N. Siki Reddy	10–21, 24–22, 16–21	(silver) Runner-up
2014	Turkey International	(Turkey) Özge Bayrak	(Bulgaria) Gabriela Stoeva (Bulgaria) Stefani Stoeva	11–21, 9–21	(silver) Runner-up
2015	Iran Fajr International	(Turkey) Özge Bayrak	(Malaysia) Joyce Choong (Malaysia) Yap Cheng Wen	21–19, 21–18	(gold) Winner
2015	Mercosul International	(Turkey) Özge Bayrak	(France) Laura Choinet (France) Teshana Vignes Waran	21–10, 21–11	(gold) Winner
2015	Peru International	(Turkey) Özge Bayrak	(France) Delphine Lansac (France) Émilie Lefel	21–14, 14–21, 13–21	(silver) Runner-up
2015	White Nights	(Turkey) Özge Bayrak	(Russia) Ekaterina Bolotova (Russia) Evgeniya Kosetskaya	22–20, 13–21, 15–21	(silver) Runner-up
2015	Lagos International	(Turkey) Özge Bayrak	(India) Pradnya Gadre (India) N. Sikki Reddy	19–21, 23–21, 15–21	(silver) Runner-up
2015	Mersin Turkey International	(Turkey) Özge Bayrak	(Bulgaria) Gabriela Stoeva (Bulgaria) Stefani Stoeva	19–21, 12–21	(silver) Runner-up
2016	Turkey International	(Turkey) Özge Bayrak	(Turkey) Kader İnal (Turkey) Fatma Nur Yavuz	21–14, 21–16	(gold) Winner

BWF International Challenge tournament
BWF International Series tournament
