= Greece national badminton team =

National badminton team representing Greece

Greece
- Association: Hellenic Badminton Federation (HBF)
- Confederation: BE (Europe)
- President: Ioannis Kapos

BWF ranking
- Current ranking: 111 ▼8 (2 January 2024)
- Highest ranking: 53 (5 January 2012)

Sudirman Cup
- Appearances: 3 (first in 1997)
- Best result: Group stage

European Men's Team Championships
- Appearances: 3 (first in 2006)
- Best result: Group stage

European Women's Team Championships
- Appearances: 2 (first in 2006)
- Best result: Group stage

Helvetia Cup
- Appearances: 2 (first in 2003)
- Best result: Group stage

The Greece national badminton team (Greek: Εθνική ομάδα Αντιπτέρισης της Ελλάδας) represents Greece in international badminton team competitions. The team is controlled by the Hellenic Badminton Federation, the governing body for badminton in Greece. Greece made their first appearance in the Sudirman Cup in 1997.

At the European stage, Greece has hosted the first edition of the European Men's and Women's Team Badminton Championships in 2006 which granted the national men's and women's team qualification. The team have yet to qualify for the European Mixed Team Badminton Championships. The team also competed in the Helvetia Cup in 2003 and 2005 but did not reach the semi-finals.

Greece also competes in the Balkan Badminton Championships and has also made several bronze medal finishes at the Balkan Team Championships.

== History ==
While badminton is said to have history that can be traced back to Ancient Greece, competitive badminton was unknown in the country until the early 1990s. Following the formation of the Hellenic Badminton Federation in April 1993, Greek players began competing in international tournaments.

=== Men's team ===
Greece first competed in qualifying for the 1998 Thomas Cup in Sandefjord. Placed in Group D with Belarus, Peru and the United States, the team lost all their matches 5–0 to their opponents and were eliminated in the first round.

In 2006, Greece competed in the 2006 European Men's Team Badminton Championships and was placed into Group 5 with the Netherlands, Norway and Spain. The team lost 5–0 to all three teams and was eliminated in the group stages. The team made another two appearances at the European Men's Team Championships in 2008 and 2010 but failed to advance to the knockout stages.

=== Women's team ===
In 2004, Greece competed in the 2004 European Uber Cup Preliminaries. The team lost 5–0 to Iceland and Germany but managed to win a match in a 4–1 loss against the Norwegian women's team. At the 2006 European Women's Team Badminton Championships, the team were eliminated in the group stages.

=== Mixed team ===
In 1990, the Greek mixed team competed in the invitational Balkan Cup tournament in Varna, Bulgaria. In the group stage, the team finished third in their group after losing to Romania and Yugoslavia, then placed sixth on the overall rankings after losing 10–0 to Malta. In 1997, the team made their debut at the Sudirman Cup. The team defeated 4–1 to Lithuania, 5–0 to Estonia and 3–2 to Armenia but defeated Chile 5–0 to finish in 58th place.

At the Balkan Championships in 2005, Greece finished in third place at the Balkan Championships for the first time after defeating Moldova 3–1 in the bronze medal match. In 2009, the team reached the semi-finals of the Balkan Championships but lost 3–0 to Bulgaria. In 2011, the team played in the semi-finals of the Balkan Championships against Turkey and almost qualified for the final but eventually lost 3–2 to their opponents.

== Competitive record ==
=== Thomas Cup ===
Year	Round	Pos
1949 to 1996	Did not enter	
1998	Did not qualify	
2000	Did not qualify	
2002	Did not qualify	
2004	Did not qualify	
2006	Did not qualify	
2008	Did not qualify	
2010	Did not qualify	
2012	Did not enter	
2014	Did not enter	
2016	Did not enter	
2018	Did not enter	
2020	Did not enter	
2022	Did not enter	
2024	Did not enter	
2026	To be determined	
2028	To be determined	
2030	To be determined	

=== Uber Cup ===
Year	Round	Pos
1957 to 2002	Did not enter	
2004	Did not qualify	
2006	Did not qualify	
2008	Did not enter	
2010	Did not qualify	
2012	Did not enter	
2014	Did not enter	
2016	Did not enter	
2018	Did not enter	
2020	Did not enter	
2022	Did not enter	
2024	Did not enter	
2026	To be determined	
2028	To be determined	
2030	To be determined	

=== Sudirman Cup ===
Year	Round	Pos
1989 to 1995	Did not enter	
1997	Group stage	58th
1999	Did not enter	
2001	Group stage	49th
2003	Group stage	43rd
2005	Did not enter	
2007	Did not enter	
2009	Did not enter	
2011	Did not enter	
2013	Did not enter	
2015	Did not enter	
2017	Did not enter	
2019	Did not enter	
2021	Did not enter	
2023	Did not enter	
2025	Did not enter	
2027	To be determined	
2029	To be determined	

=== European Team Championships ===
==== Men's team ====
Year	Round	Pos
2006	Group stage	25/32
2008	Group stage	23/28
2010	Group stage	23/28
2012	Did not enter	
2014	Did not enter	
2016	Did not enter	
2018	Did not enter	
2020	Did not enter	
2024	Did not enter	
2026	To be determined	
2028	To be determined	
2030	To be determined	

==== Women's team ====
Year	Round	Pos
2006	Group stage	15/21
2008	Did not enter	
2010	Group stage	19/24
2012	Did not enter	
2014	Did not enter	
2016	Did not enter	
2018	Did not enter	
2020	Did not enter	
2024	Did not enter	
2026	To be determined	
2028	To be determined	
2030	To be determined	

==== Mixed team ====
Year	Round	Pos
1972 to 2025	Did not enter	
2027	To be determined	
2029	To be determined	

=== Helvetia Cup ===
Year	Round	Pos
1962 to 2001	Did not enter	
2003	Group stage	16th
2005	Group stage	18th
2007	Did not enter	

=== Balkan Badminton Championships ===
==== Mixed team ====
Year	Round	Pos
1992	Fourth place	4th
1993	Fourth place	4th
1995	Fourth place	4th
1997	Fourth place	4th
1998	Fourth place	4th
1999	Fifth place	5th
2000	Fourth place	4th
2001	Fourth place	4th
2002	Fourth place	4th
2003	Fifth place	5th
2004	Fifth place	5th
2005	Third place	3rd
2006	Did not enter	
2007	Fourth place	4th
2008	Fourth place	4th
2009	Semi-finals	4th
2010	Did not enter	
2011	Semi-finals	3rd
2011	Group stage (Team B)	6th
2012	Group stage	7th
2013	Group stage	5th
2014	Semi-finals	4th
2016	Did not enter	
2018	Semi-finals	4th
2018	Group stage (Team B)	6th

**Red border color indicates tournament was held on home soil.

== Junior competitive record ==
=== Suhandinata Cup ===
Year	Round	Pos
2000 to 2024	Did not enter	
2025	To be determined	

=== European Junior Team Championships ===
==== Mixed team ====
Year	Round	Pos
1975 to 2007	Did not enter	
2009	Group stage	29th
2011	Did not enter	
2013	Did not enter	
2015	Group stage	31/32
2017	Did not enter	
2018	Did not enter	
2020	Did not enter	
2022	Group stage	25/32
2024	To be determined	

=== Finlandia Cup ===
==== Mixed team ====
Year	Round	Pos
1984 to 1996	Did not enter	
1998	Group stage	22nd
2000	Did not enter	
2002	Group stage	12th
2004	Did not enter	
2006	Did not enter	

=== Balkan Junior Team Championships ===
==== Mixed team ====
Year	Round	Pos
1992	Did not enter	
1993	Did not enter	
1994	Did not enter	
1995	Fourth place	4th
1996	Third place	3rd
1997	Fourth place	4th
1998	Fourth place	4th
1999	Fifth place	5th
2000	Fifth place	5th
2001	Fourth place	4th
2002	Fourth place	4th
2004	Fifth place	5th
2005	Fifth place	5th
2006	Did not enter	
2007	Semi-finals	4th
2008	Fourth place	4th
2010	Group stage	5th
2010	Group stage (Team B)	6th
2011	Group stage	5th
2012	Fourth place	4th
2013	Fourth place	4th
2015	Group stage	5th
2016	Semi-finals	4th
2017	Semi-finals	3rd
2019	Did not enter	

**Red border color indicates tournament was held on home soil.

== Coaches ==
The following shows a list of coaches for the Greece national badminton team.

=== Current coaches ===
- (Greece) Vasilis Xanthou (2004–present)
- (Greece) Alexandros Kantzoglou (2009–present)
- (Greece) Charalambos Iordanou
- (Greece) Athena Hadjistyllis

=== Former coaches ===
- (Greece) Panagiotis Goudentzikis (1991–2003)
- (Bulgaria) Kesov Nenko (2003–2005)
- (Bulgaria) Petar Dimov (2004–2012)

== Players ==
=== Current squad ===
As of 2 January 2024

==== Men's team ====
Name	DoB/Age	Ranking of event		
Name	DoB/Age	MS	MD	XD
Stamatis Tsigkirdakis	16 October 1992 (age 33)	-	-	-
Marios Michail Boulios	21 March 2000 (age 26)	-	-	-
Paschalis Melikidis	30 October 1998 (age 27)	1735	-	-
Axilleas Tsartsidis	20 October 1996 (age 29)	1735	-	-
Metzelos Sotiropoulos	19 September 2005 (age 20)	-	-	-
Georgios Tsiolis	23 February 2002 (age 24)	-	-	-

==== Women's team ====
Name	DoB/Age	Ranking of event		
Name	DoB/Age	WS	WD	XD
Grammatoula Sotiriou	18 April 2002 (age 24)	311	-	-
Theodora Lambrianidou	14 February 2002 (age 24)	-	-	-
Antonia-Petroula Vlachantoni	29 June 2004 (age 21)	-	-	-
Athanasia-Paulina Vlachantoni	29 June 2004 (age 21)	-	-	-
Theodora Fragoulidou	20 October 2001 (age 24)	986	-	-
Dimitra-Kalomira Kroystalli	17 March 2001 (age 25)	-	-	-
