= Romania national badminton team =

National badminton team

Romania
- Association: Federația Română de Badminton (FRB)
- Confederation: BE (Europe)
- President: Marian Pandele

BWF ranking
- Current ranking: 128 ▼3 (2 January 2024)
- Highest ranking: 81 (6 October 2016)

European Men's Team Championships
- Appearances: 1 (first in 2006)
- Best result: Group stage

Helvetia Cup
- Appearances: 6 (first in 1991)
- Best result: Group stage (2007)

The Romania national badminton team (Romanian: Echipa națională de badminton a României) represents Romania in international badminton team competitions. The Romanian national team have never participated in the Sudirman Cup, Thomas Cup and the Uber Cup. Romania participated in the 2006 European Men's Team Badminton Championships and were eliminated in the group stages.

The Romanian team also competes in the Balkan Badminton Championships along with other Balkan countries. The team has had multiple runners-up finishes at the Balkan mixed team championships. Romanian badminton made one of its first international presences when national player Florin Balaban competed in men's singles at the 1992 Summer Olympics.

The Romanian junior team were runners-up at the 2000 Finlandia Cup in Pressbaum, Austria.

== History ==
Badminton first reached Romania in 1958 when the sport was played in university sporting events.

Badminton competitions in Romania were first hosted in December 1975, with the first badminton competition titled the 30 December Cup (Romanian: Cupa 30 Decembrie) organized in the city of Târgu Mureș by the Pioneer Organization and the Mureș County Council. In 1977, the competition was later renamed the Mureș Cup. Badminton then gained minuscule popularity when counties from around the country started to compete in the competition.

On 29 January 1990, the Romanian Badminton Federation was established. Soon after, the national federation started to send the national squad to compete in the Balkan Badminton Championships.

=== Men's team ===
The Romanian men's team first competed in the 2006 European Men's Team Badminton Championships. In the group stages, the team lost 5–0 to the Czech Republic and 4–1 to France. The team failed to qualify for the quarter-finals but managed to win 3–2 against the Turkish team to finish 3rd in the group.

=== Mixed team ===
Romania first competed in the 1997 Balkan Badminton Team Championships. The mixed team finished as runners-up after losing the match for first place 5–0 to Bulgaria in the round-robin competition. The team competed in the 2003 Helvetia Cup and finished in 17th place. In 2007, the team competed in the 2007 Helvetia Cup. The team finished second in their group after defeating Wales and Luxembourg in the group tie. They then defeated Belgium 3–2 and finished in 7th place. In 2008, the team lost in the finals of the 2008 Balkan Team Championships to rivals Bulgaria. In 2010, the mixed team finished in third place after winning 3–2 against Moldova at the 2010 Balkan Badminton Team Championships.

== Competitive record ==
=== Thomas Cup ===
Year	Round	Pos
1949 to 2002	Did not enter	
2004	Did not qualify	
2006	Did not qualify	
2008	Did not enter	
2010	Did not enter	
2012	Did not enter	
2014	Did not enter	
2016	Did not enter	
2018	Did not enter	
2020	Did not enter	
2022	Did not enter	
2024	Did not enter	
2026	To be determined	
2028	To be determined	
2030	To be determined	

=== Uber Cup ===
Year	Round	Pos
1957 to 2002	Did not enter	
2004	Did not qualify	
2006	Did not enter	
2008	Did not enter	
2010	Did not enter	
2012	Did not enter	
2014	Did not enter	
2016	Did not enter	
2018	Did not enter	
2020	Did not enter	
2022	Did not enter	
2024	Did not enter	
2026	To be determined	
2028	To be determined	
2030	To be determined	

=== Sudirman Cup ===
Year	Round	Pos
1989 to 2025	Did not enter	
2027	To be determined	
2029	To be determined	

=== European Team Championships ===
==== Men's team ====
Year	Round	Pos
2006	Group stage	17/24
2008	Did not enter	
2010	Did not enter	
2012	Did not enter	
2014	Did not enter	
2016	Did not enter	
2018	Did not enter	
2020	Did not enter	
2024	Did not enter	
2026	To be determined	
2028	To be determined	
2030	To be determined	

==== Women's team ====
Year	Round	Pos
2006	Did not enter	
2008	Did not enter	
2010	Did not enter	
2012	Did not enter	
2014	Did not enter	
2016	Did not enter	
2018	Did not enter	
2020	Did not enter	
2024	Did not enter	
2026	To be determined	
2028	To be determined	
2030	To be determined	

==== Mixed team ====
Year	Round	Pos
1972 to 2025	Did not enter	
2027	To be determined	
2029	To be determined	

=== Helvetia Cup ===
Year	Round	Pos
1962 to 1989	Did not enter	
1991	Group stage	11th
1993	Group stage	17th
1995	Did not enter	
1997	Group stage	15th
1999	Did not enter	
2001	Did not enter	
2003	Group stage	17th
2005	Group stage	13th
2007	Group stage	7th

=== Balkan Badminton Championships ===
==== Mixed team ====
Year	Round	Pos
1992	Runners-up	2nd
1993	Runners-up	2nd
1995	Runners-up	2nd
1997	Runners-up	2nd
1998	Runners-up	2nd
1999	Runners-up	2nd
2000	Runners-up	2nd
2001	Runners-up	2nd
2002	Runners-up	2nd
2003	Runners-up	2nd
2004	Runners-up	2nd
2005	Runners-up	2nd
2006	Fourth place	4th
2007	Third place	3rd
2008	Runners-up	2nd
2009	Did not enter	
2010	Third place	3rd
2011	Group stage	5th
2012	Third place	3rd
2013	Semi-finals	4th
2014	Semi-finals	3rd
2016	Runners-up	2nd
2018	Did not enter	

**Red border color indicates tournament was held on home soil.

== Junior competitive record ==
=== Suhandinata Cup ===
Year	Round	Pos
(China) 2000	Group stage	19th of 24
(South Africa) 2002	Did not enter	
(Canada) 2004	Did not enter	
(South Korea) 2006	Did not enter	
(New Zealand) 2007	Did not enter	
(India) 2008	Did not enter	
(Malaysia) 2009	Did not enter	
(Mexico) 2010	Did not enter	
(Taiwan) 2011	Did not enter	
(Japan) 2012	Did not enter	
(Thailand) 2013	Did not enter	
(Malaysia) 2014	Did not enter	
(Peru) 2015	Did not enter	
(Spain) 2016	Group stage	41st of 52
(Indonesia) 2017	Did not enter	
(Canada) 2018	Did not enter	
(Russia) 2019	Did not enter	
(New Zealand) 2020	Cancelled because of COVID-19 pandemic	
(China) 2021	Cancelled because of COVID-19 pandemic	
(Spain) 2022	Did not enter	
(United States) 2023	Did not enter	
(China) 2024	Did not enter	
(India) 2025	Group stage	24th of 36
(Egypt) 2026	Group stage	24th of 47

=== European Junior Team Championships ===
==== Mixed team ====
Year	Round	Pos
1975 to 1989	Did not enter	
1991	Group stage	26th
1993	Group stage	25th
1995	Did not enter	
1997	Did not enter	
1999	Did not enter	
2001	Group stage	11th
2003	Group stage	16th
2005	Did not enter	
2007	Did not enter	
2009	Group stage	22/28
2011	Group stage	15/21
2013	Group stage	22/28
2015	Group stage	17/24
2017	Did not enter	
2018	Group stage	33/34
2020	Did not enter	
2022	Group stage	17/24
2024	Quarter-finals	5/8

=== Finlandia Cup ===
==== Mixed team ====
Year	Round	Pos
1984 to 1990	Did not enter	
1992	Group stage	16th
1994	Group stage	13th
1996	Did not enter	
1998	Group stage	15th
2000	Runners-up	2nd
2002	Did not enter	
2004	Did not enter	
2006	Did not enter	

=== Balkan Junior Team Championships ===
==== Mixed team ====
Year	Round	Pos
1992	Runners-up	2nd
1993	Runners-up	2nd
1994	Runners-up	2nd
1995	Champions	1st
1996	Did not enter	
1997	Runners-up	2nd
1998	Runners-up	2nd
1999	Runners-up	2nd
2000	Champions	1st
2001	Runners-up	2nd
2002	Runners-up	2nd
2004	Fourth place	4th
2005	Third place	3rd
2006	Third place	3rd
2007	Semi-finals	3rd
2008	Third place	3rd
2010	Third place	3rd
2011	Semi-finals	3rd
2012	Third place	3rd
2013	Did not enter	
2015	Semi-finals	4th
2016	Group stage	5th
2017	Group stage	6th
2019	Did not enter	

**Red border color indicates tournament was held on home soil.

== Coaches ==
The following shows a list of coaches for the Romania national badminton team.

=== Current coaches ===
- (Romania) Ştefan Nyari (1991–present)
- (Romania) Corina Dan (1993–present)

=== Former coaches ===
- (Romania) Zoltan Demeter-Erdei (1983–1989; 1990–1993)
- (Bulgaria) Boris Popov (1992–1999)
- (Romania) Constantin Cios (1992–1994)
- (Romania) Mircea Agapi (1992–2015)
- (Romania) Tamara Savu (1997–2011)

== Players ==
=== Current squad ===
As of 2 January 2024

==== Men's team ====
Name	DoB/Age	Ranking of event		
Name	DoB/Age	MS	MD	XD
Teodor-Ioan Cioroboiu	3 February 2004 (age 22)	778	-	-
Călin Turcu	18 May 2005 (age 21)	-	-	-
Rareș Garalbatin	20 November 2005 (age 20)	-	-	-
Dinu Pandele	13 November 2005 (age 20)	-	-	-
Luca-Stefan Pandele	13 August 2007 (age 19)	-	-	-
George Şerbănescu	31 July 2004 (age 22)	-	-	-

==== Women's team ====
Name	DoB/Age	Ranking of event		
Name	DoB/Age	WS	WD	XD
Laura Constantin	7 January 2007 (age 19)	-	-	-
Denisa-Maria Muscalu	13 May 2007 (age 19)	-	-	-
Anamaria Șerban	11 January 2005 (age 21)	-	-	-
Andra Stoica	16 June 2006 (age 20)	-	-	-
Maria Duțu	23 March 2001 (age 25)	-	-	-
Ioana Grecea	17 February 2001 (age 25)	-	-	-
