= 2013 Balkan Badminton Championships =

Tournament details
- Dates: 29 September – 1 October
- Venue: Mladost Hall
- Location: Burgas, Bulgaria

The 2013 Balkan Badminton Championships (Bulgarian: балканско първенство по бадминтон 2013) was a badminton tournament sanctioned by the Balkan Badminton Association and Badminton Europe. The individual and mixed team events were held from 29 September to 1 October 2013.

The tournament was held at the Mladost Hall in Burgas, Bulgaria. Seven countries took part in the championships. In the team event, Bulgaria won gold by defeating Turkey 3–0 in the final.

Bulgaria topped the medal table in the individual events with five gold medals and six bronze medals. This was also the first time all-Romanian final was established in the men's doubles event since the first edition of the championships in 1992.

== Medal summary ==
=== Medalists ===
Event	Gold	Silver	Bronze
Men's singles	(Bulgaria) Ivan Rusev	(Turkey) Yusuf Ramazan Bay	(Bulgaria) Peyo Boichinov
Men's singles	(Bulgaria) Ivan Rusev	(Turkey) Yusuf Ramazan Bay	(Bulgaria) Gergin Nedyalkov
Women's singles	(Bulgaria) Stefani Stoeva	(Turkey) Ebru Tunalı	(Bulgaria) Mila Ivanova
Women's singles	(Bulgaria) Stefani Stoeva	(Turkey) Ebru Tunalı	(Bulgaria) Dimitria Popstoikova
Men's doubles	(Romania) Marius Corciuc (Romania) Ionuț Gradinaru	(Romania) Robert Ciobotaru (Romania) Daniel Cojocaru	(Turkey) Yusuf Ramazan Bay (Turkey) Sinan Zorlu
Men's doubles	(Romania) Marius Corciuc (Romania) Ionuț Gradinaru	(Romania) Robert Ciobotaru (Romania) Daniel Cojocaru	(Bulgaria) Gergin Nedyalkov (Bulgaria) Ivan Rusev
Women's doubles	(Bulgaria) Gabriela Stoeva (Bulgaria) Stefani Stoeva	(Turkey) Aycan Koç (Turkey) Ebru Tunalı	(Turkey) Derya Çalımbay (Turkey) Kübra Karataş
Women's doubles	(Bulgaria) Gabriela Stoeva (Bulgaria) Stefani Stoeva	(Turkey) Aycan Koç (Turkey) Ebru Tunalı	(Bulgaria) Mila Ivanova (Bulgaria) Dimitria Popstoikova
Mixed doubles	(Bulgaria) Blagovest Kisyov (Bulgaria) Gabriela Stoeva	(Romania) Marius Corciuc (Romania) Emanuela Avrămuţ	(Turkey) Erol Ceylan (Turkey) Aycan Koç
Mixed doubles	(Bulgaria) Blagovest Kisyov (Bulgaria) Gabriela Stoeva	(Romania) Marius Corciuc (Romania) Emanuela Avrămuţ	(Greece) Ilias Xanthou (Greece) Eleni Melikidou
Mixed team	Bulgaria; Peyo Boichinov; Blagovest Kisyov; Gergin Nedyalkov; Ivan Rusev; Mila Ivanova; Dimitria Popstoikova; Gabriela Stoeva; Stefani Stoeva	Turkey; Yusuf Ramazan Bay; Erol Ceylan; Sinan Zorlu; Derya Çalımbay; Aycan Koç; Kübra Karataş; Ebru Tunalı	Romania; Robert Ciobotaru; Daniel Cojocaru; Marius Corciuc; Ionut Gradinaru; Emanuela Avrămuţ; Alexandra Milon
Mixed team	Bulgaria; Peyo Boichinov; Blagovest Kisyov; Gergin Nedyalkov; Ivan Rusev; Mila Ivanova; Dimitria Popstoikova; Gabriela Stoeva; Stefani Stoeva	Turkey; Yusuf Ramazan Bay; Erol Ceylan; Sinan Zorlu; Derya Çalımbay; Aycan Koç; Kübra Karataş; Ebru Tunalı	Serbia; Nikola Arsić; Igor Bjelan; Miodrag Kaličanin; Ilija Pavlović; Borko Petrović; Dragoslav Petrović; Jovica Rujević; Sandra Halilović; Andrijana Stanković

=== Medal table ===
* Host nation (Bulgaria)

Rank	Nation	Gold	Silver	Bronze	Total
1	Bulgaria*	5	0	6	11
2	Romania	1	2	1	4
3	Turkey	0	4	3	7
4	Greece	0	0	1	1
4	Serbia	0	0	1	1
Totals (5 entries)		6	6	12	24

== Team event ==
=== Group stage ===
==== Group A ====
Pos	Team	Pld	W	L	MF	MA	MD	Pts	Qualification
1	Bulgaria (H)	3	3	0	15	0	+15	3	Advance to knockout stage
2	Serbia	3	2	1	9	6	+3	2	Advance to knockout stage
3	Greece	3	1	2	3	12	−9	1	
4	Moldova	3	0	3	3	12	−9	0	

Source: blitz.bg
(H) Host

==== Group B ====
Pos	Team	Pld	W	L	MF	MA	MD	Pts	Qualification
1	Turkey	2	2	0	8	2	+6	2	Advance to knockout stage
2	Romania	2	1	1	7	3	+4	1	Advance to knockout stage
3	North Macedonia	2	0	2	0	10	−10	0	

Source: blitz.bg

=== Knockout stage ===
==== Bracket ====
Semi-finals
Bulgaria	3
Romania	0
Serbia	0
Turkey	3

Final
Bulgaria	3
Turkey	0
