= 2011 Balkan Badminton Championships =

Tournament details
- Dates: 21–23 October
- Venue: Polygyros Indoor Gymnasium
- Location: Polygyros, Greece

The 2011 Balkan Badminton Championships (Greek: Βαλκανικού Πρωταθλήματος Αντιπτέρισης 2011) was a badminton tournament sanctioned by the Balkan Badminton Association and Badminton Europe. The individual and mixed team events were held from 21 to 23 October 2011.

The tournament was held at the Polygyros Indoor Gymnasium in Polygyros, Greece. Seven countries took part in the championships. Bulgaria won the team event by defeating Turkey 3–1 in the final.

Greece won their first ever gold medal in the Balkan Championships when Anne Hald Jensen defeated Dimitria Popstoikova of Bulgaria in the final of the women's singles event.

== Medal summary ==
=== Medalists ===
Event	Gold	Silver	Bronze
Men's singles	(Turkey) Ramazan Öztürk	(Bulgaria) Peyo Boichinov	(Bulgaria) Ivan Rusev
Men's singles	(Turkey) Ramazan Öztürk	(Bulgaria) Peyo Boichinov	(Turkey) Emre Vural
Women's singles	(Greece) Anna Hald-Charalambidou	(Bulgaria) Dimitria Popstoikova	(Turkey) Ebru Tunalı
Women's singles	(Greece) Anna Hald-Charalambidou	(Bulgaria) Dimitria Popstoikova	(Serbia) Sandra Halilović
Men's doubles	(Bulgaria) Peyo Boichinov (Bulgaria) Ivan Rusev	(Turkey) Emre Aslan (Turkey) Hüseyin Oruç	(Turkey) Ramazan Öztürk (Turkey) Emre Vural
Men's doubles	(Bulgaria) Peyo Boichinov (Bulgaria) Ivan Rusev	(Turkey) Emre Aslan (Turkey) Hüseyin Oruç	(Greece) Georgios Galvas (Greece) Panagiotis Skarlatos
Women's doubles	(Bulgaria) Dimitria Popstoikova (Bulgaria) Gabriela Stoeva	(Romania) Florentina Constantinescu (Romania) Alexandra Milon	(Turkey) Öznur Çalışkan (Turkey) Ebru Tunalı
Women's doubles	(Bulgaria) Dimitria Popstoikova (Bulgaria) Gabriela Stoeva	(Romania) Florentina Constantinescu (Romania) Alexandra Milon	(Greece) Antonia Karagiaouridou (Greece) Petroula Toga
Mixed doubles	(Bulgaria) Julian Hristov (Bulgaria) Gabriela Stoeva	(Greece) Georgios Charalambidis (Greece) Anna Hald-Charalambidou	(Turkey) Hüseyin Oruç (Turkey) Ebru Yazgan
Mixed doubles	(Bulgaria) Julian Hristov (Bulgaria) Gabriela Stoeva	(Greece) Georgios Charalambidis (Greece) Anna Hald-Charalambidou	(Romania) Robert Ciobotaru (Romania) Florentina Constantinescu
Mixed team	Bulgaria; Peyo Boichinov; Julian Hristov; Ivan Rusev; Dimitria Popstoikova; Gabriela Stoeva	Turkey; Emre Aslan; Hüseyin Oruç; Ramazan Öztürk; Emre Vural; Öznur Çalışkan; Ebru Tunalı; Ebru Yazgan	Greece; Georgios Charalambidis; Georgios Galvas; Panagiotis Skarlatos; Theodoros Velkos; Ioanna Karkantzia; Antonia Karagiaouridou; Theodora Ligomenou; Petroula Toga
Mixed team	Bulgaria; Peyo Boichinov; Julian Hristov; Ivan Rusev; Dimitria Popstoikova; Gabriela Stoeva	Turkey; Emre Aslan; Hüseyin Oruç; Ramazan Öztürk; Emre Vural; Öznur Çalışkan; Ebru Tunalı; Ebru Yazgan	Serbia; Nikola Arsić; Igor Bjelan; Ilija Pavlović; Vladimir Savić; Sandra Halilović; Ivana Maksimović; Milica Simić

=== Medal table ===
* Host nation (Greece)

Rank	Nation	Gold	Silver	Bronze	Total
1	Bulgaria	1	3	5	9
2	Turkey	1	2	5	8
3	Greece*	1	2	3	6
4	Romania	0	1	1	2
5	Serbia	0	0	2	2
Totals (5 entries)		3	8	16	27

== Team event ==
=== Group stage ===
==== Group A ====
Pos	Team	Pld	W	L	MF	MA	MD	Pts	Qualification
1	Bulgaria	2	2	0	10	0	+10	2	Advance to knockout stage
2	Greece (H)	2	1	1	5	5	0	1	Advance to knockout stage
3	Greece B (H)	2	0	2	0	10	−10	0	

Source: Turkish Badminton Federation
(H) Host

==== Group B ====
Pos	Team	Pld	W	L	MF	MA	MD	Pts	Qualification
1	Turkey	2	2	0	10	0	+10	2	Advance to knockout stage
2	Serbia	2	1	1	3	7	−4	1	Advance to knockout stage
3	Romania	2	0	2	2	8	−6	0	

Source: Turkish Badminton Federation

=== Knockout stage ===
==== Bracket ====
Semi-finals
Bulgaria	3
Serbia	0
Greece	2
Turkey	3

Final
Bulgaria	3
Turkey	1
