= 2026 European Men's Team Badminton Championships qualification stage =

The following results are the 2026 European Men's Team Badminton Championships qualification stage.

== Summary ==
The qualification stage was held between 3 and 7 December 2025 in 5 cities across Europe.

Group	Host city	Qualifiers	Failed to qualify
1	(Estonia) Tallinn; Kalev Sport Hall	England	Estonia; Israel; Luxembourg
2	(Germany) Kelkheim; Staufenhalle	Germany	Poland; Belgium; Norway
3	(Czech Republic) Prague; Repy Sports Hall	Finland	Hungary; Bulgaria
3	(Czech Republic) Prague; Repy Sports Hall	Finland	Austria^{§} Czech Republic; Iceland
4	(Republic of Ireland) Dublin; Baldoyle Badminton Centre	Spain	Ireland^{§} Netherlands; Switzerland
4	(Republic of Ireland) Dublin; Baldoyle Badminton Centre	Spain	Italy; Slovakia
5	(Portugal) Caldas da Rainha; Badminton High Performance Sports Centre	Sweden	Azerbaijan^{§} Ukraine; Croatia
5	(Portugal) Caldas da Rainha; Badminton High Performance Sports Centre	Sweden	Portugal; Slovenia

- §: Subgroup winner.

== Group 1 ==
Pos	Team	Pld	W	L	MF	MA	MD	GF	GA	GD	PF	PA	PD	Pts	Qualification
1	England (Q)	3	3	0	14	1	+13	28	2	+26	617	348	+269	3	Advance to Final tournament
2	Estonia	3	2	1	8	7	+1	16	18	−2	567	603	−36	2	
3	Israel	3	1	2	7	8	−1	17	17	0	613	580	+33	1	
4	Luxembourg	3	0	3	1	14	−13	4	28	−24	388	654	−266	0	

Source: BWF
(Q) Qualified to the phase indicated

=== England vs. Luxembourg ===
England
5
Kalev Sports Hall, Court 2
3 December 2025, 13:00 UTC+1

Luxembourg
0

			1	2	3
1	(England) (Luxembourg)	Cholan Kayan; Jerome Pauquet	21; 10	21; 8
2	(England) (Luxembourg)	Nadeem Dalvi; Sam Reinert	21; 8	21; 3
3	(England) (Luxembourg)	Sid Palakkal; Noah Warning	21; 16	21; 7
4	(England) (Luxembourg)	Sean Vendy / Harry Wakefield; Tom Feltes / Yannick Feltes	21; 11	21; 16
5	(England) (Luxembourg)	Robin Harper / Ben Lane; Sam Reinert / Noah Warning	21; 5	21; 7

=== Estonia vs. Israel ===
Estonia
3
Kalev Sports Hall, Court 2
3 December 2025, 18:00 UTC+1

Israel
2

			1	2	3
1	(Estonia) (Israel)	Tauri Kilk; Daniil Dubovenko	16; 21	11; 21
2	(Estonia) (Israel)	Karl Kert; Misha Zilberman	19; 21	16; 21
3	(Estonia) (Israel)	Tauri Kilk / Hugo Themas; Mark Aronchik / Daniil Dubovenko	18; 21	21; 16	22; 20
4	(Estonia) (Israel)	Marti Joost; Maxim Grinblat	15; 21	21; 16	21; 9
5	(Estonia) (Israel)	Kristjan Kaljurand / Raul Käsner; Danylo Dubynskyi / Misha Zilberman	24; 22	10; 21	21; 14

=== Israel vs. Luxembourg ===
Israel
4
Kalev Sports Hall, Court 2
4 December 2025, 13:00 UTC+1

Luxembourg
1

			1	2	3
1	(Israel) (Luxembourg)	Daniil Dubovenko; Jerome Pauquet	21; 14	21; 8
2	(Israel) (Luxembourg)	Misha Zilberman; Sam Reinert	21; 14	21; 5
3	(Israel) (Luxembourg)	Danylo Dubynskyi; Noah Warning	17; 21	21; 18	21; 12
4	(Israel) (Luxembourg)	Mark Aronchik / Maxim Grinblat; Yannick Feltes / Jerome Pauquet	16; 21	17; 21
5	(Israel) (Luxembourg)	Daniil Dubovenko / Danylo Dubynskyi; Tom Feltes / Sam Reinert	21; 7	21; 7

=== England vs. Estonia ===
England
5
Kalev Sports Hall, Court 2
4 December 2025, 18:00 UTC+1

Estonia
0

			1	2	3
1	(England) (Estonia)	Harry Huang; Tauri Kilk	21; 6	21; 16
2	(England) (Estonia)	Ben Lane / Sean Vendy; Kristjan Kaljurand / Raul Käsner	21; 7	21; 13
3	(England) (Estonia)	Cholan Kayan; Karl Kert	21; 5	21; 5
4	(England) (Estonia)	Oliver Butler / Samuel Jones; Tauri Kilk / Hugo Themas	21; 16	21; 13
5	(England) (Estonia)	Nadeem Dalvi; Marti Joost	21; 13	21; 12

=== England vs. Israel ===
England
4
Kalev Sports Hall, Court 2
5 December 2025, 13:00 UTC+1

Israel
1

			1	2	3
1	(England) (Israel)	Harry Huang; Daniil Dubovenko	21; 16	21; 15
2	(England) (Israel)	Cholan Kayan; Misha Zilberman	15; 21	14; 21
3	(England) (Israel)	Sid Palakkal; Danylo Dubynskyi	21; 9	21; 18
4	(England) (Israel)	Oliver Butler / Samuel Jones; Mark Aronchik / Maxim Grinblat	21; 9	21; 11
5	(England) (Israel)	Robin Harper / Harry Wakefield; Daniil Dubovenko / Danylo Dubynskyi	21; 14	21; 17

=== Estonia vs. Luxembourg ===
Estonia
5
Kalev Sports Hall, Court 2
5 December 2025, 18:00 UTC+1

Luxembourg
0

			1	2	3
1	(Estonia) (Luxembourg)	Tauri Kilk; Jerome Pauquet	21; 17	21; 12
2	(Estonia) (Luxembourg)	Karl Kert; Sam Reinert	21; 10	21; 12
3	(Estonia) (Luxembourg)	Kristjan Kaljurand / Raul Käsner; Yannick Feltes / Jerome Pauquet	21; 17	21; 14
4	(Estonia) (Luxembourg)	Marti Joost; Noah Warning	16; 21	21; 13	21; 7
5	(Estonia) (Luxembourg)	Mikk Õunmaa / Rasmus Roogsoo; Tom Feltes / Sam Reinert	21; 13	21; 13

== Group 2 ==
Pos	Team	Pld	W	L	MF	MA	MD	GF	GA	GD	PF	PA	PD	Pts	Qualification
1	Germany (Q)	3	3	0	13	2	+11	26	8	+18	679	537	+142	3	Advance to Final tournament
2	Poland	3	2	1	10	5	+5	23	12	+11	684	592	+92	2	
3	Belgium	3	1	2	6	9	−3	13	19	−6	561	598	−37	1	
4	Norway	3	0	3	1	14	−13	6	29	−23	525	722	−197	0	

Source: BWF
(Q) Qualified to the phase indicated

=== Belgium vs. Poland ===
Belgium
1
Staufenhalle, Court 1
5 December 2025, 14:00 UTC+1

Poland
4

			1	2	3
1	(Belgium) (Poland)	Julien Carraggi; Mikołaj Szymanowski	21; 13	21; 15
2	(Belgium) (Poland)	Yaro van Delsen; Dominik Kwinta	15; 21	14; 21
3	(Belgium) (Poland)	Baptiste Rolin; Mateusz Golas	19; 21	18; 21
4	(Belgium) (Poland)	Iljo van Delsen / Yaro van Delsen; Adrian Krawczyk / Krzysztof Podkowiński	16; 21	6; 21
5	(Belgium) (Poland)	Marijn Put / Dylan Rosius; Dominik Kwinta / Szymon Slepecki	12; 21	20; 22

=== Germany vs. Norway ===
Germany
5
Staufenhalle, Court 2
5 December 2025, 18:00 UTC+1

Norway
0

			1	2	3
1	(Germany) (Norway)	Matthias Kicklitz; Markus Barth	21; 15	21; 18
2	(Germany) (Norway)	Malik Bourakkadi / Marvin Seidel; Torjus Flåtten / Jonas Østhassel	21; 11	21; 7
3	(Germany) (Norway)	Kian-Yu Oei; Aleksander Jakovlevs	21; 10	18; 21	21; 12
4	(Germany) (Norway)	Jonathan Dresp / Simon Krax; Filip Bøhn / Sander Østhassel	21; 12	21; 7
5	(Germany) (Norway)	Sanjeevi Padmanabhan Vasudevan; Mathias Wong	21; 11	22; 20

=== Belgium vs. Norway ===
Belgium
5
Staufenhalle, Court 1
6 December 2025, 14:00 UTC+1

Norway
0

			1	2	3
1	(Belgium) (Norway)	Julien Carraggi; Markus Barth	21; 13	21; 18
2	(Belgium) (Norway)	Yaro van Delsen; Aleksander Jakovlevs	21; 17	21; 12
3	(Belgium) (Norway)	Iljo van Delsen / Yaro van Delsen; Torjus Flåtten / Jonas Østhassel	21; 19	21; 19
4	(Belgium) (Norway)	Baptiste Rolin; Mathias Wong	21; 18	21; 15
5	(Belgium) (Norway)	Marijn Put / Dylan Rosius; Filip Bøhn / Sander Østhassel	21; 9	19; 21	21; 10

=== Germany vs. Poland ===
Germany
3
Staufenhalle, Court 2
6 December 2025, 18:00 UTC+1

Poland
2

			1	2	3
1	(Germany) (Poland)	Matthias Kicklitz; Mikołaj Szymanowski	21; 17	19; 21	21; 13
2	(Germany) (Poland)	Jones Ralfy Jansen / Marvin Seidel; Adrian Krawczyk / Szymon Slepecki	21; 15	19; 21	21; 13
3	(Germany) (Poland)	Kian-Yu Oei; Dominik Kwinta	8; 21	13; 21
4	(Germany) (Poland)	Jonathan Dresp / Bjarne Geiss; Mikołaj Morawski / Krzysztof Podkowiński	21; 18	21; 16
5	(Germany) (Poland)	Sanjeevi Padmanabhan Vasudevan; Mateusz Golas	24; 26	11; 21

=== Norway vs. Poland ===
Norway
1
Staufenhalle, Court 1
7 December 2025, 12:00 UTC+1

Poland
4

			1	2	3
1	(Norway) (Poland)	Markus Barth; Mikołaj Szymanowski	9; 21	21; 14	21; 17
2	(Norway) (Poland)	Torjus Flåtten / Jonas Østhassel; Adrian Krawczyk / Szymon Slepecki	21; 19	9; 21	24; 26
3	(Norway) (Poland)	Aleksander Jakovlevs; Dominik Kwinta	15; 21	14; 21
4	(Norway) (Poland)	Filip Bøhn / Sander Østhassel; Mikołaj Morawski / Krzysztof Podkowiński	14; 21	22; 20	16; 21
5	(Norway) (Poland)	Mathias Wong; Maksymilian Danielak	10; 21	14; 21

=== Germany vs. Belgium ===
Germany
5
Staufenhalle, Court 2
7 December 2025, 16:00 UTC+1

Belgium
0

			1	2	3
1	(Germany) (Belgium)	Matthias Kicklitz; Julien Carraggi	21; 15	21; 17
2	(Germany) (Belgium)	Sanjeevi Padmanabhan Vasudevan; Yaro van Delsen	21; 16	21; 18
3	(Germany) (Belgium)	Bjarne Geiss / Simon Krax; Marijn Put / Dylan Rosius	21; 13	21; 9
4	(Germany) (Belgium)	Aaron Sonnenschein; Baptiste Rolin	21; 18	21; 16
5	(Germany) (Belgium)	Malik Bourakkadi / Jones Ralfy Jansen; Iljo van Delsen / Yaro van Delsen	21; 11	20; 22	21; 15

== Group 3 ==
=== Subgroup 3A ===
Pos	Team	Pld	W	L	MF	MA	MD	GF	GA	GD	PF	PA	PD	Pts	Qualification
1	Finland (Q)	2	2	0	9	1	+8	18	2	+16	408	222	+186	2	Advance to decider
2	Hungary	2	1	1	4	6	−2	10	13	−3	400	428	−28	1	
3	Bulgaria	2	0	2	2	8	−6	5	18	−13	312	470	−158	0	

Source: BWF
(Q) Qualified to the phase indicated

==== Hungary vs. Finland ====
Hungary
1
Sports hall Repy, Court 1
4 December 2025, 10:00 UTC+1

Finland
4

			1	2	3
1	(Hungary) (Finland)	Ádám Könczöl; Joakim Oldorff	7; 21	14; 21
2	(Hungary) (Finland)	Kristóf Tóth; Kalle Koljonen	9; 21	14; 21
3	(Hungary) (Finland)	Milán Mesterházy; Ananda Galvani Daniswara	13; 21	13; 21
4	(Hungary) (Finland)	Csanád Horváth / Miklós Kis-Kasza; Ananda Galvani Daniswara / Eliel Melleri	21; 18	21; 12
5	(Hungary) (Finland)	Milán Mesterházy / Péter Palkovics; Kalle Koljonen / Joakim Oldorff	12; 21	16; 21

==== Bulgaria vs. Hungary ====
Bulgaria
2
Sports hall Repy, Court 1
5 December 2025, 10:00 UTC+1

Hungary
3

			1	2	3
1	(Bulgaria) (Hungary)	Iliyan Stoynov; Ádám Könczöl	21; 19	14; 21	18; 21
2	(Bulgaria) (Hungary)	Tsvetomir Stoyanov; Kristóf Tóth	21; 16	16; 21	21; 12
3	(Bulgaria) (Hungary)	Tsvetan Ivanov; Milán Mesterházy	8; 21	12; 21
4	(Bulgaria) (Hungary)	Evgeni Panev / Iliyan Stoynov; Csanád Horváth / Miklós Kis-Kasza	16; 21	15; 21
5	(Bulgaria) (Hungary)	Ivan Rusev / Tsvetomir Stoyanov; Milán Mesterházy / Péter Palkovics	22; 20	21; 23	25; 23

==== Bulgaria vs. Finland ====
Bulgaria
0
Sports hall Repy, Court 1
6 December 2025, 10:00 UTC+1

Finland
5

			1	2	3
1	(Bulgaria) (Finland)	Iliyan Stoynov; Joakim Oldorff	10; 21	17; 21
2	(Bulgaria) (Finland)	Tsvetomir Stoyanov; Kalle Koljonen	9; 21	11; 21
3	(Bulgaria) (Finland)	Tsvetan Ivanov; Eliel Melleri	12; 21	8; 21
4	(Bulgaria) (Finland)	Evgeni Panev / Tsvetomir Stoyanov; Kalle Koljonen / Joakim Oldorff	6; 21	9; 21
5	(Bulgaria) (Finland)	Ivan Rusev / Iliyan Stoynov; Ananda Galvani Daniswara / Eliel Melleri				w/o

=== Subgroup 3B ===
Pos	Team	Pld	W	L	MF	MA	MD	GF	GA	GD	PF	PA	PD	Pts	Qualification
1	Austria (Q)	2	2	0	8	2	+6	16	5	+11	407	296	+111	2	Advance to decider
2	Czech Republic	2	1	1	7	3	+4	15	6	+9	399	312	+87	1	
3	Iceland	2	0	2	0	10	−10	0	20	−20	222	420	−198	0	

Source: BWF
(Q) Qualified to the phase indicated

==== Iceland vs. Czech Republic ====
Iceland
0
Sports hall Repy, Court 1
4 December 2025, 14:00 UTC+1

Czech Republic
5

			1	2	3
1	(Iceland) (Czech Republic)	Gustav Nilsson; Dominik Kopřiva	11; 21	14; 21
2	(Iceland) (Czech Republic)	Einar Óli Guðbjörnsson; Jan Louda	13; 21	9; 21
3	(Iceland) (Czech Republic)	David Bjarni Björnsson / Kristófer Darri Finnsson; Jiří Král / Ondřej Král	12; 21	14; 21
4	(Iceland) (Czech Republic)	Eggert Þór Eggertsson; Daniel Dvořák	9; 21	18; 21
5	(Iceland) (Czech Republic)	Einar Óli Guðbjörnsson / Gustav Nilsson; Vojtěch Havlíček / Tomáš Švejda	9; 21	6; 21

==== Austria vs. Iceland ====
Austria
5
Sports hall Repy, Court 1
5 December 2025, 14:00 UTC+1

Iceland
0

			1	2	3
1	(Austria) (Iceland)	Collins Valentine Filimon; Gustav Nilsson	21; 17	21; 12
2	(Austria) (Iceland)	Kai Niederhuber; Einar Óli Guðbjörnsson	21; 5	21; 10
3	(Austria) (Iceland)	Leon Seiwald; Eggert Þór Eggertsson	21; 10	21; 10
4	(Austria) (Iceland)	Wolfgang Gnedt / Kai Niederhuber; David Bjarni Björnsson / Kristófer Darri Finnsson	21; 10	21; 14
5	(Austria) (Iceland)	Collins Valentine Filimon / Adi Pratama; Einar Óli Guðbjörnsson / Gustav Nilsson	21; 8	21; 11

==== Austria vs. Czechia ====
Austria
3
Sports hall Repy, Court 1
6 December 2025, 14:00 UTC+1

Czech Republic
2

			1	2	3
1	(Austria) (Czech Republic)	Collins Valentine Filimon; Dominik Kopřiva	21; 14	21; 14
2	(Austria) (Czech Republic)	Wolfgang Gnedt; Jan Louda	19; 21	16; 21
3	(Austria) (Czech Republic)	Kai Niederhuber; Lukáš Patzák	21; 11	21; 8
4	(Austria) (Czech Republic)	Collins Valentine Filimon / Adi Pratama; Jan Janoštík / Ondřej Král	21; 18	8; 21	21; 19
5	(Austria) (Czech Republic)	Kai Niederhuber / Leon Seiwald; Jiří Král / Tomáš Švejda	18; 21	10; 21

=== Decider ===
Finland
3
Sports hall Repy, Court 1
7 December 2025, 10:00 UTC+1

Austria
0

			1	2	3
1	(Finland) (Austria)	Joakim Oldorff; Collins Valentine Filimon	21; 15	18; 21	21; 17
2	(Finland) (Austria)	Kalle Koljonen; Wolfgang Gnedt	21; 18	21; 15
3	(Finland) (Austria)	Ananda Galvani Daniswara; Kai Niederhuber	18; 21	21; 19	21; 17
4	(Finland) (Austria)	Kalle Koljonen / Eliel Melleri; Kai Niederhuber / Leon Seiwald				not played
5	(Finland) (Austria)	Ananda Galvani Daniswara / Joakim Oldorff; Collins Valentine Filimon / Adi Pratama				not played

== Group 4 ==
=== Subgroup 4A ===
Pos	Team	Pld	W	L	MF	MA	MD	GF	GA	GD	PF	PA	PD	Pts	Qualification
1	Ireland (Q)	2	1	1	6	4	+2	14	9	+5	427	412	+15	1	Advance to decider
2	Netherlands	2	1	1	5	5	0	11	12	−1	402	412	−10	1	
3	Switzerland	2	1	1	4	6	−2	10	14	−4	423	428	−5	1	

Source: BWF
(Q) Qualified to the phase indicated

==== Netherlands vs. Ireland ====
Netherlands
1
Baldoyle Badminton Centre, Court 1
4 December 2025, 17:00 UTC+1

Ireland
4

			1	2	3
1	(Netherlands) (Republic of Ireland)	Noah Haase; Nhat Nguyen	14; 21	16; 21
2	(Netherlands) (Republic of Ireland)	Adith Karthikeyan Priya; Dylan Noble	22; 20	21; 8
3	(Netherlands) (Republic of Ireland)	Dion Hoegen; Joshua Magee	18; 21	7; 21
4	(Netherlands) (Republic of Ireland)	Noah Haase / Timo Stoffelen; Scott Guildea / Paul Reynolds	17; 21	14; 21
5	(Netherlands) (Republic of Ireland)	Andy Buijk / Brian Wassink; Matthew Cheung / Joshua Magee	18; 21	21; 16	20; 22

=== Switzerland vs. Netherlands ===
Switzerland
1
Baldoyle Badminton Centre, Court 1
5 December 2025, 17:00 UTC+1

Netherlands
4

			1	2	3
1	(Switzerland) (Netherlands)	Julien Scheiwiller; Noah Haase	15; 21	5; 21
2	(Switzerland) (Netherlands)	Tobias Künzi; Adith Karthikeyan Priya	21; 18	17; 21	16; 21
3	(Switzerland) (Netherlands)	Nicolas Müller; Dion Hoegen	21; 7	21; 6
4	(Switzerland) (Netherlands)	Yann Orteu / Minh Quang Pham; Noah Haase / Timo Stoffelen	21; 15	19; 21	16; 21
5	(Switzerland) (Netherlands)	Nicolas Franconville / Tobias Künzi; Andy Buijk / Brian Wassink	10; 21	17; 21

=== Switzerland vs. Ireland ===
Switzerland
3
Baldoyle Badminton Centre, Court 1
6 December 2025, 17:00 UTC+1

Ireland
2

			1	2	3
1	(Switzerland) (Republic of Ireland)	Julien Scheiwiller; Nhat Nguyen	8; 21	17; 21
2	(Switzerland) (Republic of Ireland)	Nicolas Müller; Dylan Noble	21; 10	21; 11
3	(Switzerland) (Republic of Ireland)	Lorrain Joliat; Joshua Magee	19; 21	21; 17	21; 16
4	(Switzerland) (Republic of Ireland)	Yann Orteu / Minh Quang Pham; Scott Guildea / Paul Reynolds	19; 21	18; 21
5	(Switzerland) (Republic of Ireland)	Nicolas Franconville / Tobias Künzi; Matthew Cheung / Joshua Magee	21; 17	17; 21	21; 17

=== Subgroup 4B ===
Pos	Team	Pld	W	L	MF	MA	MD	GF	GA	GD	PF	PA	PD	Pts	Qualification
1	Spain (Q)	2	2	0	7	3	+4	16	8	+8	447	351	+96	2	Advance to decider
2	Italy	2	1	1	7	3	+4	16	8	+8	468	348	+120	1	
3	Slovakia	2	0	2	1	9	−8	3	19	−16	231	447	−216	0	

Source: BWF
(Q) Qualified to the phase indicated

==== Slovakia vs. Spain ====
Slovakia
1
Baldoyle Badminton Centre, Court 1
4 December 2025, 13:00 UTC+1

Spain
4

			1	2	3
1	(Slovakia) (Spain)	Milan Dratva; Pablo Abián	21; 14	19; 21	21; 16
2	(Slovakia) (Spain)	Andrej Suchý; Álvaro Leal	6; 8			retired
3	(Slovakia) (Spain)	Marian Liptak; Miguel Esteve	8; 21	17; 21
4	(Slovakia) (Spain)	Andrej Suchý / Simeon Suchý; Daniel Franco / Rodrigo Sanjurjo	0; 21	0; 21
5	(Slovakia) (Spain)	Marián Lipták / Matúš Poláček; Jacobo Fernández / Alberto Perals	8; 21	11; 21

==== Italy vs. Slovakia ====
Italy
5
Baldoyle Badminton Centre, Court 1
5 December 2025, 13:00 UTC+1

Slovakia
0

			1	2	3
1	(Italy) (Slovakia)	Giovanni Toti; Simeon Suchý	21; 8	18; 21	21; 7
2	(Italy) (Slovakia)	Fabio Caponio; Matúš Poláček	21; 12	21; 5
3	(Italy) (Slovakia)	Luca Zhou; Marián Lipták	21; 9	21; 11
4	(Italy) (Slovakia)	Matteo Massetti / Giovanni Toti; Milan Dratva / Simeon Suchý	21; 13	21; 14
5	(Italy) (Slovakia)	Fabio Caponio / Luca Zhou; Marián Lipták / Matúš Poláček	21; 12	21; 8

==== Italy vs. Spain ====
Italy
2
Baldoyle Badminton Centre, Court 1
6 December 2025, 13:00 UTC+1

Spain
3

			1	2	3
1	(Italy) (Spain)	Fabio Caponio; Pablo Abián	16; 21	21; 12	15; 9	retired
2	(Italy) (Spain)	Enrico Baroni; Álvaro Leal	21; 23	21; 8	17; 21
3	(Italy) (Spain)	Luca Zhou; Miguel Esteve	21; 13	21; 15
4	(Italy) (Spain)	Fabio Caponio / Giovanni Toti; Daniel Franco / Rodrigo Sanjurjo	15; 21	24; 22	15; 21
5	(Italy) (Spain)	Matteo Massetti / Luca Zhou; Rubén García / Carlos Piris	14; 21	13; 21

=== Decider ===
Ireland
1
Baldoyle Badminton Centre, Court 1
7 December 2025, 13:00 UTC+1

Spain
3

			1	2	3
1	(Republic of Ireland) (Spain)	Nhat Nguyen; Álvaro Leal	21; 14	21; 10
2	(Republic of Ireland) (Spain)	Matthew Cheung; Miguel Esteve	21; 11	12; 21	17; 21
3	(Republic of Ireland) (Spain)	Joshua Magee; Rubén García	9; 21	21; 9	18; 21
4	(Republic of Ireland) (Spain)	Scott Guildea / Paul Reynolds; Daniel Franco / Rodrigo Sanjurjo	17; 21	12; 21
5	(Republic of Ireland) (Spain)	Joshua Magee / Nhat Nguyen; Jacobo Fernández / Rubén García				not played

== Group 5 ==
=== Subgroup 5A ===
Pos	Team	Pld	W	L	MF	MA	MD	GF	GA	GD	PF	PA	PD	Pts	Qualification
1	Azerbaijan (Q)	2	2	0	8	2	+6	16	6	+10	435	339	+96	2	Advance to decider
2	Ukraine	2	1	1	6	4	+2	13	8	+5	393	337	+56	1	
3	Croatia	2	0	2	1	9	−8	3	18	−15	277	429	−152	0	

Source: BWF
(Q) Qualified to the phase indicated

==== Ukraine vs. Azerbaijan ====
Ukraine
2
Badminton High Performance Sports Centre – Joaquim Lopes, Court 1
4 December 2025, 17:00 UTC+1

Azerbaijan
3

			1	2	3
1	(Ukraine) (Azerbaijan)	Oleksii Titov; Ade Resky Dwicahyo	21; 17	21; 17
2	(Ukraine) (Azerbaijan)	Danylo Bosniuk; Dicky Dwi Pangestu	21; 18	18; 21	16; 21
3	(Ukraine) (Azerbaijan)	Ivan Druzchenko; Ulvi Huseynov	14; 21	11; 21
4	(Ukraine) (Azerbaijan)	Danylo Bosniuk / Nikita Yeromenko; Ade Resky Dwicahyo / Dicky Dwi Pangestu	16; 21	10; 21
5	(Ukraine) (Azerbaijan)	Vitaly Konov / Artem Pochtarov; Agil Gabilov / Ulvi Huseynov	21; 12	21; 19

==== Croatia vs. Ukraine ====
Croatia
1
Badminton High Performance Sports Centre – Joaquim Lopes, Court 1
5 December 2025, 15:00 UTC+1

Ukraine
4

			1	2	3
1	(Croatia) (Ukraine)	Aria Dinata; Oleksii Titov	21; 16	21; 17
2	(Croatia) (Ukraine)	Vito Radovanović; Artem Pochtarov	10; 21	11; 21
3	(Croatia) (Ukraine)	Vito Saganić; Danylo Bosniuk	6; 21	9; 21
4	(Croatia) (Ukraine)	Ivan Kosor / Vito Radovanović; Vitaly Konov / Artem Pochtarov	8; 21	8; 21
5	(Croatia) (Ukraine)	Aria Dinata / Vito Saganić; Ivan Druzchenko / Nikita Yeromenko	21; 23	13; 21

==== Croatia vs. Azerbaijan ====
Croatia
0
Badminton High Performance Sports Centre – Joaquim Lopes, Court 1
6 December 2025, 15:00 UTC+1

Azerbaijan
5

			1	2	3
1	(Croatia) (Azerbaijan)	Vito Radovanović; Ade Resky Dwicahyo	6; 21	10; 21
2	(Croatia) (Azerbaijan)	Ivan Kosor; Dicky Dwi Pangestu	9; 21	8; 21
3	(Croatia) (Azerbaijan)	Vito Saganić; Ulvi Huseynov	16; 21	12; 21
4	(Croatia) (Azerbaijan)	Aria Dinata / Vito Radovanović; Ade Resky Dwicahyo / Dicky Dwi Pangestu	21; 16	17; 21	15; 21
5	(Croatia) (Azerbaijan)	Ivan Kosor / Vito Saganić; Jahid Alhasanov / Agil Gabilov	17; 21	18; 21

=== Subgroup 5B ===
Pos	Team	Pld	W	L	MF	MA	MD	GF	GA	GD	PF	PA	PD	Pts	Qualification
1	Sweden (Q)	2	2	0	9	1	+8	18	5	+13	460	344	+116	2	Advance to decider
2	Portugal	2	1	1	4	6	−2	10	13	−3	412	412	0	1	
3	Slovenia	2	0	2	2	8	−6	7	17	−10	358	474	−116	0	

Source: BWF
(Q) Qualified to the phase indicated

==== Slovenia vs. Sweden ====
Slovenia
0
Badminton High Performance Sports Centre – Joaquim Lopes, Court 2
4 December 2025, 17:00 UTC+1

Sweden
5

			1	2	3
1	(Slovenia) (Sweden)	Miha Ivančič; Gustav Björkler	11; 21	7; 21
2	(Slovenia) (Sweden)	Gal Bizjak / Maj Poboljšaj; Filip Karlborg / Oscar Reuterhall	16; 21	21; 14	11; 21
3	(Slovenia) (Sweden)	Mark Koroša; Tim Mörk	13; 21	12; 21
4	(Slovenia) (Sweden)	Miha Ivančič / Tadej Jelenc; Mio Molin / Max Svensson	21; 19	13; 21	14; 21
5	(Slovenia) (Sweden)	Ziga Podgoršek; Kim Linell	14; 21	10; 21

==== Portugal vs. Slovenia ====
Portugal
3
Badminton High Performance Sports Centre – Joaquim Lopes, Court 2
5 December 2025, 15:00 UTC+1

Slovenia
2

			1	2	3
1	(Portugal) (Slovenia)	Bruno Carvalho; Miha Ivančič	18; 21	21; 10	21; 12
2	(Portugal) (Slovenia)	Diogo Glória; Mark Koroša	21; 18	21; 13
3	(Portugal) (Slovenia)	Simão Ferreira / David Silva; Gal Bizjak / Maj Poboljšaj	21; 17	22; 24	13; 21
4	(Portugal) (Slovenia)	Tiago Berenguer; Ziga Podgoršek	21; 11	21; 6
5	(Portugal) (Slovenia)	Diogo Glória / Gabriel Rodrigues; Miha Ivančič / Tadej Jelenc	15; 21	16; 21

==== Portugal vs. Sweden ====
Portugal
1
Badminton High Performance Sports Centre – Joaquim Lopes, Court 2
6 December 2025, 15:00 UTC+1

Sweden
4

			1	2	3
1	(Portugal) (Sweden)	Bruno Carvalho; Gustav Björkler	10; 21	13; 21
2	(Portugal) (Sweden)	Diogo Glória; Tim Mörk	21; 19	21; 14
3	(Portugal) (Sweden)	Bruno Carvalho / David Silva; Jakob Ekman / Oscar Reuterhall	19; 21	21; 16	19; 21
4	(Portugal) (Sweden)	Tiago Berenguer; Kim Linell	12; 21	14; 21
5	(Portugal) (Sweden)	Diogo Glória / Gabriel Rodrigues; Filip Karlborg / Max Svensson	18; 21	13; 21

=== Decider ===
==== Azerbaijan vs. Sweden ====
Azerbaijan
1
Badminton High Performance Sports Centre – Joaquim Lopes, Court 1
7 December 2025, 15:00 UTC+1

Sweden
3

			1	2	3
1	(Azerbaijan) (Sweden)	Ade Resky Dwicahyo; Gustav Björkler	19; 21	14; 21
2	(Azerbaijan) (Sweden)	Dicky Dwi Pangestu; Tim Mörk	21; 15	21; 16
3	(Azerbaijan) (Sweden)	Jahid Alhasanov / Agil Gabilov; Gustav Björkler / Mio Molin	9; 21	14; 21
4	(Azerbaijan) (Sweden)	Ulvi Huseynov; Kim Linell	13; 21	9; 21
5	(Azerbaijan) (Sweden)	Ade Resky Dwicahyo / Dicky Dwi Pangestu; Filip Karlborg / Max Svensson				not played
