= Yugoslav National Badminton Championships =

The Yugoslavian National Badminton Championships is a tournament organized to crown the best badminton players in Yugoslavia. They were held between 1994 and 2002, and were succeeded by the Serbian and Montenegrin National Badminton Championships and Serbian National Badminton Championships. In other parts of the former SFR Yugoslavia, national badminton championships are held, too (Bosnia and Herzegovina, Croatia, Slovenia).

== Past winners ==
Year	Men's singles	Women's singles	Men's doubles	Women's doubles	Mixed doubles
1994	Ivan Đurić	Nataša Ostojić	no competition		
1995	Jovan Marković	Nataša Ostojić	Jovan Marković; Zoran Vuković	Nataša Ostojić; Danijela Đukić	Jovan Marković; Nataša Ostojić
1996	Jovan Marković	Nataša Ostojić	Zoran Stepanović; Radomir Jovović	Nataša Ostojić; Ružica Marić	Jovan Marković; Ružica Marić
1997	Jovan Marković	Jovanka Knežević	Jovan Marković; Bojan Jakovljević	Nataša Ostojić; Ružica Marić	Bojan Jakovljević; Ružica Marić
1998	Jovan Marković	Jelena Obrić	Jovan Marković; Bojan Jakovljević	Jelena Obrić; Marija Glogovac	Bojan Jakovljević; Jelena Obrić
1999	Radomir Jovović	Jelena Obrić	Radomir Jovović; Zoran Stepanović	Jelena Obrić; Marija Glogovac	Bojan Jakovljević; Jelena Obrić
2000	Jovan Marković	Jelena Obrić	Jovan Marković; Bojan Jakovljević	Jelena Obrić; Marija Glogovac	Bojan Jakovljević; Jelena Obrić
2001	Radomir Jovović	Jelena Obrić	Radomir Jovović; Zoran Stepanović	Jelena Obrić; Ana Marić	Bojan Jakovljević; Jelena Obrić
2002	Radomir Jovović	Jelena Obrić	Jovan Marković; Bojan Jakovljević	Jelena Obrić; Ana Marić	no competition
