= 2009 Balkan Badminton Championships =

Tournament details
- Dates: 2–4 July
- Venue: Beroe Sports Hall
- Location: Stara Zagora, Bulgaria

The 2009 Balkan Badminton Championships (Bulgarian: балканско първенство по бадминтон 2009) was a badminton tournament sanctioned by the Balkan Badminton Association and Badminton Europe. The individual and mixed team events were held from 2 to 4 July 2009.

The tournament was held at the Beroe Sports Hall in Stara Zagora, Bulgaria. Six countries took part in the championships. In the team event, Bulgaria defeated Turkey 3–0 in the final while Serbia and Greece were awarded bronze.

In the individual events, Bulgaria finished first on the medal table, followed by Turkey with one gold medal, three silver medals and five bronze medals.

== Medal summary ==
=== Medalists ===
Event	Gold	Silver	Bronze
Men's singles	(Bulgaria) Stiliyan Makarski	(Bulgaria) Krasimir Jankov	(Turkey) Mehmet Tural
Men's singles	(Bulgaria) Stiliyan Makarski	(Bulgaria) Krasimir Jankov	(Turkey) Hasan Hüseyin Durakcan
Women's singles	(Bulgaria) Petya Nedelcheva	(Turkey) Özge Bayrak	(Turkey) Öznur Çalışkan
Women's singles	(Bulgaria) Petya Nedelcheva	(Turkey) Özge Bayrak	(Bulgaria) Bistra Maneva
Men's doubles	(Turkey) Kamil Akcebe (Turkey) Ali Kaya	(Bulgaria) Krasimir Jankov (Bulgaria) Vladimir Metodiev	(Turkey) Hasan Hüseyin Durakcan (Turkey) Göksel Kundakçı
Men's doubles	(Turkey) Kamil Akcebe (Turkey) Ali Kaya	(Bulgaria) Krasimir Jankov (Bulgaria) Vladimir Metodiev	(Bulgaria) Sarkis Agopyan (Bulgaria) Julian Hristov
Women's doubles	(Bulgaria) Diana Dimova (Bulgaria) Petya Nedelcheva	(Bulgaria) Bistra Maneva (Bulgaria) Dimitria Popstoikova	(Turkey) İsmet Balakçı (Turkey) Erden Kenan
Women's doubles	(Bulgaria) Diana Dimova (Bulgaria) Petya Nedelcheva	(Bulgaria) Bistra Maneva (Bulgaria) Dimitria Popstoikova	(Serbia) Sandra Halilović (Serbia) Milica Simić
Mixed doubles	(Bulgaria) Stiliyan Makarski (Bulgaria) Diana Dimova	(Turkey) Ali Kaya (Turkey) Ezgi Epice	(Bulgaria) Julian Hristov (Bulgaria) Dimitria Popstoikova
Mixed doubles	(Bulgaria) Stiliyan Makarski (Bulgaria) Diana Dimova	(Turkey) Ali Kaya (Turkey) Ezgi Epice	(Bulgaria) Vladimir Metodiev (Bulgaria) Bistra Maneva
Mixed team	Bulgaria; Sarkis Agopyan; Julian Hristov; Krasimir Jankov; Vladimir Metodiev; Diana Dimova; Bistra Maneva; Petya Nedelcheva; Dimitria Popstoikova	Turkey; Kamil Akcebe; Hasan Hüseyin Durakcan; Ali Kaya; Göksel Kundakçı; Mehmet Tural; İsmet Balakçı; Özge Bayrak; Öznur Çalışkan; Ezgi Epice; Kenan Erden	Serbia; Nikola Arsić; Igor Bjelan; Ilija Pavlović; Vladimir Savić; Sandra Halilović; Sara Samardžić; Milica Simić; Stefana Stanković
Mixed team	Bulgaria; Sarkis Agopyan; Julian Hristov; Krasimir Jankov; Vladimir Metodiev; Diana Dimova; Bistra Maneva; Petya Nedelcheva; Dimitria Popstoikova	Turkey; Kamil Akcebe; Hasan Hüseyin Durakcan; Ali Kaya; Göksel Kundakçı; Mehmet Tural; İsmet Balakçı; Özge Bayrak; Öznur Çalışkan; Ezgi Epice; Kenan Erden	Greece; Georgios Charalambidis; Georgios Galvas; Panagiotis Skarlatos; Theodoros Velkos; Christina Diamantopoulou; Theodora Ligomenou; Ioanna Karkantzia; Eleni Tsamousiadou

=== Medal table ===
* Host nation (Bulgaria)

Rank	Nation	Gold	Silver	Bronze	Total
1	Bulgaria*	5	3	4	12
2	Turkey	1	3	5	9
3	Serbia	0	0	2	2
Totals (3 entries)		6	6	11	23

== Team event ==
=== Group stage ===
==== Group A ====
Pos	Team	Pld	W	L	MF	MA	MD	Pts	Qualification
1	Bulgaria (H)	2	2	0	10	0	+10	2	Advance to knockout stage
2	Serbia	2	1	1	5	5	0	1	Advance to knockout stage
3	North Macedonia	2	0	2	0	10	−10	0	

Source: Badminton savez Srbije
(H) Host

==== Group B ====
Pos	Team	Pld	W	L	MF	MA	MD	Pts	Qualification
1	Turkey	2	2	0	10	0	+10	2	Advance to knockout stage
2	Greece	2	1	1	3	7	−4	1	Advance to knockout stage
3	Moldova	2	0	2	2	8	−6	0	

Source: Badminton savez Srbije

=== Knockout stage ===
==== Bracket ====
Semi-finals
Bulgaria	3
Greece	0
Serbia	0
Turkey	3

Final
Bulgaria	3
Turkey	0
