= 2007 Balkan Badminton Championships =

Tournament details
- Dates: 6–9 September
- Venue: DZU Sports Hall
- Location: Stara Zagora, Bulgaria

The 2007 Balkan Badminton Championships (Bulgarian: балканско първенство по бадминтон 2007) was a badminton tournament sanctioned by the Balkan Badminton Association and Badminton Europe. The individual and mixed team events were held from 6 to 9 September 2007.

The tournament was held at the DZU Sports Hall in Stara Zagora, Bulgaria. Seven countries took part in the championships. In the team event, Bulgaria defeated Turkey 3–0 in the final while Romania defeated Greece 3–0 in the third place playoff.

== Background ==
The championships were initially planned to be held in Razgrad at the Abritus Sports Hall but was later moved to Stara Zagora due to the delayed renovation of the nominated venue.

== Medal summary ==
=== Medalists ===
Event	Gold	Silver	Bronze
Men's singles	(Bulgaria) Krasimir Jankov	(Bulgaria) Hristo Nedeltchev	(Bulgaria) Blagovest Kisyov
Men's singles	(Bulgaria) Krasimir Jankov	(Bulgaria) Hristo Nedeltchev	(Turkey) Ali Kaya
Women's singles	(Bulgaria) Diana Dimova	(Bulgaria) Maya Dobreva	(Turkey) Nursel Aydoğmuş
Women's singles	(Bulgaria) Diana Dimova	(Bulgaria) Maya Dobreva	(Romania) Florentina Petre
Men's doubles	(Bulgaria) Stiliyan Makarski (Bulgaria) Vladimir Metodiev	(Bulgaria) Konstantin Dobrev (Bulgaria) Blagovest Kisyov	(Turkey) Ali Kaya (Turkey) Göksel Kundakçı
Men's doubles	(Bulgaria) Stiliyan Makarski (Bulgaria) Vladimir Metodiev	(Bulgaria) Konstantin Dobrev (Bulgaria) Blagovest Kisyov	(Romania) Robert Ciobotaru (Romania) George Constantinescu
Women's doubles	(Bulgaria) Diana Dimova (Bulgaria) Dimitria Popstoikova	(Bulgaria) Maya Dobreva (Bulgaria) Atanaska Spasova	(Turkey) Derya Çalımbay (Turkey) Nur Damia Özer
Women's doubles	(Bulgaria) Diana Dimova (Bulgaria) Dimitria Popstoikova	(Bulgaria) Maya Dobreva (Bulgaria) Atanaska Spasova	(Romania) Alexandra Milon (Romania) Florentina Petre
Mixed doubles	(Bulgaria) Vladimir Metodiev (Bulgaria) Diana Dimova	(Bulgaria) Stiliyan Makarski (Bulgaria) Maya Dobreva	(Bulgaria) Julian Hristov (Bulgaria) Dimitria Popstoikova
Mixed doubles	(Bulgaria) Vladimir Metodiev (Bulgaria) Diana Dimova	(Bulgaria) Stiliyan Makarski (Bulgaria) Maya Dobreva	(Turkey) Ali Kaya (Turkey) Nursel Aydoğmuş
Mixed team	Bulgaria; Konstantin Dobrev; Julian Hristov; Krasimir Jankov; Blagovest Kisyov; Vladimir Metodiev; Hristo Nedeltchev; Diana Dimova; Maya Dobreva; Dimitria Popstoikova; Atanaska Spasova	Turkey; Ali Kaya; Göksel Kundakçı; Murat Şen; Mustafa Yalvarıcı; Nursel Aydoğmuş; Derya Çalımbay; Ezgi Epice; Nur Damia Özer	Romania; Robert Ciobotaru; George Constantinescu; Florin Patroaica; Florin Posteucă; Alexandra Agu; Diana Apostu; Alexandra Milon; Florentina Petre

=== Medal table ===
* Host nation (Bulgaria)

Rank	Nation	Gold	Silver	Bronze	Total
1	Bulgaria*	6	5	2	13
2	Turkey	0	1	5	6
3	Romania	0	0	4	4
Totals (3 entries)		6	6	11	23

== Team event ==
=== Round robin ===
==== Group A ====
Pos	Team	Pld	W	L	MF	MA	MD	Pts	Qualification
1	Bulgaria (H)	2	2	0	10	0	+10	2	Advance to knockout stage
2	Romania	2	1	1	5	5	0	1	Advance to knockout stage
3	Moldova	2	0	2	0	10	−10	0	

Source: Badminton savez Srbije
(H) Host

==== Group B ====
Pos	Team	Pld	W	L	MF	MA	MD	Pts	Qualification
1	Turkey	2	3	0	15	0	+15	3	Advance to knockout stage
2	Greece	2	2	1	7	8	−1	2	Advance to knockout stage
3	Serbia	2	1	2	5	10	−5	1	Advance to knockout stage
4	Bulgaria Deaflympics Team (H)	2	0	3	3	12	−9	0	

Source: Badminton savez Srbije
(H) Host

=== Knockout stage ===
==== Bracket ====
Quarter-finals
Romania	5
Serbia	0

Semi-finals
Bulgaria	5
Greece	0
Romania	1
Turkey	4

Final
Bulgaria	3
Turkey	0
Third place
Greece	0
Romania	3
