= Anne Hald Jensen =

Danish badminton player (born 1990)

Personal information
- Born: 2 March 1990 (age 36) Sønderborg, Denmark

Sport
- Country: Denmark; Greece
- Sport: Badminton
- Handedness: Right

Women's singles & doubles
- Highest ranking: 52 (WS 10 November 2011); 115 (WD 29 March 2012); 78 (XD 23 February 2012)
- BWF profile
Medal record
Women's badminton
Representing Greece
Balkan Championships
Gold medal – first place	2011 Polygyros	Women's singles
Silver medal – second place	2011 Polygyros	Mixed doubles
Representing Denmark
European Junior Championships
Gold medal – first place	2009 Milan	Girls' singles
Gold medal – first place	2009 Milan	Mixed team
Bronze medal – third place	2007 Völklingen	Mixed team

Anne Hald Jensen (born 2 March 1990) is a Danish badminton player. She represented Greece in 2010–2011. In 2009, she won the gold medals at the European Junior Championships in the girls' singles and mixed team events.

From 2010 to 2011, she represented Greece in international tournaments and won a gold medal in women's singles at the 2011 Balkan Badminton Championships. She also won a silver medal at the Balkan Championships in mixed doubles with Georgios Charalambidis.

== Achievements ==
=== Balkan Championships ===
Women's singles
Year	Venue	Opponent	Score	Result
2011	Polygyros Indoor Gymnasium, Polygyros, Greece	(Bulgaria) Dimitria Popstoikova	21–16, 21–5	Gold

Mixed doubles
Year	Venue	Partner	Opponent	Score	Result
2011	Polygyros Indoor Gymnasium, Polygyros, Greece	(Greece) Georgios Charalambidis	(Bulgaria) Julian Hristov (Bulgaria) Gabriela Stoeva	19–21, 19–21	Silver

=== European Junior Championships ===
Girls' singles
Year	Venue	Opponent	Score	Result
2009	Federal Technical Centre - Palabadminton; Milan, Italy	(Spain) Carolina Marín	18–21, 21–18, 21–19	Gold

=== BWF International Challenge/Series (10 titles, 9 runners-up) ===
Women's singles
Year	Tournament	Opponent	Score	Result
2007	Slovak International	(Ukraine) Mariya Martynenko	21–12, 21–18	(gold) Winner
2009	Estonian International	(Russia) Tatjana Bibik	11–21, 10–21	(silver) Runner-up
2009	Turkey International	(Turkey) Li Shuang	14–21, 16–21	(silver) Runner-up
2009	Kharkiv International	(Russia) Tatjana Bibik	21–17, 21–13	(gold) Winner
2010	Bahrain International	(Turkey) Özge Bayrak	21–15, 21–8	(gold) Winner
2010	Hungarian International	(Germany) Karin Schnaase	15–21, 16–21	(silver) Runner-up
2010	Kenya International	(Nigeria) Grace Gabriel	21–6, 21–10	(gold) Winner
2010	Uganda International	(Spain) Carolina Marín	18–21, 21–19, 18–21	(silver) Runner-up
2011	Turkiye Open	(Turkey) Özge Bayrak	14–21, 21–9, 21–18	(gold) Winner
2011	Santo Domingo Open	(Mexico) Victoria Montero	21–13, 21–11	(gold) Winner
2011	Miami International	(Mexico) Victoria Montero	21–9, 21–9	(gold) Winner
2013	Lithuanian International	(Lithuania) Akvilė Stapušaitytė	18–21, 15–21	(silver) Runner-up
2017	Croatian International	(England) Georgina Bland	22–20, 21–18	(gold) Winner
2017	Romanian International	(Spain) Clara Azurmendi	Walkover	(silver) Runner-up
2017	Lithuanian International	(Czech Republic) Tereza Švábíková	21–18, 3–0 retired	(gold) Winner

Women's doubles
Year	Tournament	Partner	Opponent	Score	Result
2011	Santo Domingo Open	(France) Barbara Matias	(Dominican Republic) Orosameli Cabrera (Dominican Republic) Berónica Vibieca	21–8, 21–8	(gold) Winner
2017	Croatian International	(Denmark) Lisa Kramer	(Estonia) Kristin Kuuba (Estonia) Helina Rüütel	12–21, 9–21	(silver) Runner-up
2017	Lithuanian International	(Denmark) Lisa Kramer	(Estonia) Kristin Kuuba (Estonia) Helina Rüütel	11–21, 13–21	(silver) Runner-up

Mixed doubles
Year	Tournament	Partner	Opponent	Score	Result
2010	Uganda International	(Greece) Georgios Charalambidis	(South Africa) Dorian James (South Africa) Michelle Edwards	21–14, 19–21, 7–21	(silver) Runner-up

BWF International Challenge tournament
BWF International Series tournament
BWF Future Series tournament
