= 2008 Balkan Badminton Championships =

Tournament details
- Dates: 23–26 October
- Venue: Euro Vacanţa Multipurpose Hall
- Location: Slănic-Moldova, Romania

The 2008 Balkan Badminton Championships (Romanian: Campionatele Balcanice de Badminton 2008) was a badminton tournament sanctioned by the Balkan Badminton Association and Badminton Europe. The individual and mixed team events were held from 23 to 26 October 2008.

The tournament was held at the Euro Vacanţa Multipurpose Hall inside the Euro Vacanţa Hotel in Slănic-Moldova, Romania. A total of 72 players from six Balkan countries took part in the championships. In the team event, Bulgaria defeated Romania 3–1 in the final while Turkey defeated Greece 3–0 in the third place playoffs.

== Background ==
The championships were originally scheduled to be held in Onești but was scrapped temporarily due to the renovation of the Nadia Comăneci Gymnastics Hall. The venue was later moved to the Euro Vacanţa Multipurpose Hall.

== Medal summary ==
=== Medalists ===
Event	Gold	Silver	Bronze
Men's singles	(Romania) Robert Ciobotaru	(Romania) Florin Posteucă	(Turkey) Murat Şen
Men's singles	(Romania) Robert Ciobotaru	(Romania) Florin Posteucă	(Bulgaria) Peyo Boichinov
Women's singles	(Bulgaria) Dimitria Popstoikova	(Romania) Florentina Petre	(Turkey) Ezgi Epice
Women's singles	(Bulgaria) Dimitria Popstoikova	(Romania) Florentina Petre	(Turkey) Cemre Fere
Men's doubles	(Bulgaria) Konstantin Dobrev (Bulgaria) Julian Hristov	(Romania) Ionut Gradinaru (Romania) Florin Patroaica	(Romania) Robert Ciobotaru (Romania) George Constantinescu
Men's doubles	(Bulgaria) Konstantin Dobrev (Bulgaria) Julian Hristov	(Romania) Ionut Gradinaru (Romania) Florin Patroaica	(Bulgaria) Peyo Boichinov (Bulgaria) Yasen Borisov
Women's doubles	(Bulgaria) Diana Dimova (Bulgaria) Dimitria Popstoikova	(Romania) Carmen Blanaru (Bulgaria) Atanaska Spasova	(Romania) Alexandra Agu (Romania) Diana Apostu
Women's doubles	(Bulgaria) Diana Dimova (Bulgaria) Dimitria Popstoikova	(Romania) Carmen Blanaru (Bulgaria) Atanaska Spasova	(Romania) Magda Lozniceriu (Romania) Sonia Olariu
Mixed doubles	(Bulgaria) Konstantin Dobrev (Bulgaria) Diana Dimova	(Turkey) Ali Kaya (Turkey) Ezgi Epice	(Romania) Alexandra Milon (Romania) Florin Patroaica
Mixed doubles	(Bulgaria) Konstantin Dobrev (Bulgaria) Diana Dimova	(Turkey) Ali Kaya (Turkey) Ezgi Epice	(Bulgaria) Julian Hristov (Bulgaria) Atanaska Spasova
Mixed team	Bulgaria; Yasen Borisov; Peyo Boichinov; Konstantin Dobrev; Julian Hristov; Diana Dimova; Maya Dobreva; Dimitria Popstoikova; Atanaska Spasova	Romania; Robert Ciobotaru; George Constantinescu; Ionut Gradinaru; Florin Patroaica; Florin Posteucă; Alexandra Agu; Diana Apostu; Carmen Blanaru; Magda Lozniceriu; Alexandra Milon; Sonia Olariu; Florentina Petre	Turkey; Ali Kaya; Göksel Kundakçı; Mustafa Yalvarıcı; Murat Şen; İrem Nur Al; Derya Çalımbay; Ezgi Epice; Cemre Fere

=== Medal table ===
* Host nation (Romania)

Rank	Nation	Gold	Silver	Bronze	Total
1	Bulgaria	5	0.5	3	8.5
2	Romania*	1	4.5	4	9.5
3	Turkey	0	1	4	5
Totals (3 entries)		6	6	11	23

== Team event ==
=== Group stage ===
==== Group A ====
Pos	Team	Pld	W	L	MF	MA	MD	Pts	Qualification
1	Bulgaria	2	2	0	10	0	+10	2	Advance to knockout stage
2	Romania (H)	2	1	1	5	5	0	1	Advance to knockout stage
3	Serbia	2	0	2	0	10	−10	0	

Source: Ziarul de Bacău
(H) Host

==== Group B ====
Pos	Team	Pld	W	L	MF	MA	MD	Pts	Qualification
1	Turkey	2	2	0	9	1	+8	2	Advance to knockout stage
2	Greece	2	1	1	4	6	−2	1	Advance to knockout stage
3	Moldova	2	0	2	3	7	−4	0	

Source: Ziarul de Bacău

=== Knockout stage ===
==== Bracket ====
Semi-finals
Bulgaria	3
Greece	0
Romania	3
Turkey	1

Final
Bulgaria	3
Romania	1
Third place
Greece	0
Turkey	3
