= Serbian and Montenegrin National Badminton Championships =

The Serbian and Montenegrin National Badminton Championships was a national badminton tournament organized to crown the best badminton players in Serbia and Montenegro. It was conducted between 2003 and 2006; preceded by the Yugoslavian National Badminton Championships. This event eventually stopped after the separation of Serbia and Montenegro as separate nations.

== Past winners ==
Year	Men's singles	Women's singles	Men's doubles	Women's doubles	Mixed doubles
2003	Radomir Jovović	Ana Marić	Radomir Jovović; Zoran Stepanović	Marija Glogovac; Marija Bulatović	Zoran Stepanović; Marija Bulatović
2004	Milan Barbir	Andrea Tobolka	Milan Barbir; Žarko Petrović	Marija Bulatović; Jelena Obrić	Zoran Stepanović; Marija Bulatović
2005	Milan Barbir	Marija Bulatović	Milan Barbir; Radomir Jovović	Marija Bulatović; Marija Glogovac	Zoran Stepanović; Marija Bulatović
2006	Milan Barbir	Stefana Stanković	Milan Barbir; Nikola Marjanović	Marija Bulatović; Sandra Zorić	Radomir Jovović; Ana Zorić
