= Igor Bjelan =

Serbian badminton player (born 1992)

Personal information
- Nickname: Bjeca
- Born: 9 August 1992 (age 34) Knin, Croatia
- Height: 1.88 m (6 ft 2 in)
- Weight: 72 kg (159 lb)

Sport
- Country: Serbia
- Sport: Badminton
- Handedness: Right
- Coached by: Milan Barbir

Men's
- Highest ranking: 300 (MS) 3 Dec 2015; 287 (MD) 5 Apr 2012; 139 (XD) 20 Oct 2016
- BWF profile
Medal record
Representing Serbia
Balkan Championships
Silver medal – second place	2016 Iași	Mixed doubles
Bronze medal – third place	2009 Stara Zagora	Mixed team
Bronze medal – third place	2011 Polygyros	Mixed team
Bronze medal – third place	2013 Burgas	Mixed team
Bronze medal – third place	2016 Iași	Mixed team
Bronze medal – third place	2018 Orestiada	Mixed team

Igor Bjelan (born 9 August 1992) is a Serbian male badminton player. In 2015, he competed at the European Games in Baku, Azerbaijan. He won the Serbian National Badminton Championships in the men's singles event in 2008, 2010–2011, 2014; men's doubles event in 2010–2011, 2013, 2015; and mixed doubles event in 2010. He also represented his country at the Balkan Championships, and won the bronze medal in the mixed team event.

== Career ==
Bjelan began competing for the Serbian senior team in 2009, when he represented Serbia in the 2009 Balkan Badminton Championships and won a bronze in the mixed team event. He was also a bronze medalist at the Balkan Team Championships in 2011 and 2013. In 2015, he was one of the first Serbians to represent Serbia in badminton at the European Games alongside Milica Simić. In the men's singles event, he was eliminated in the group stages.

In 2016, he won his first individual medal at the Balkan Championships. In the mixed doubles final, he and his partner Simić lost to host favorites, Daniel Cojocaru and Alexandra Milon of Romania in two games.

== Achievements ==
=== Balkan Championships ===
Mixed doubles

Year	Venue	Partner	Opponent	Score	Result
2016	Sala Polivalentă Iași, Iași, Romania	(Serbia) Milica Simić	(Romania) Daniel Cojocaru (Romania) Alexandra Milon	19–21, 14–21	Silver
