= 2014 Balkan Badminton Championships =

Tournament details
- Dates: 13–16 November
- Venue: Beroe Sports Hall
- Location: Stara Zagora, Bulgaria

The 2014 Balkan Badminton Championships (Bulgarian: балканско първенство по бадминтон 2014) was a badminton tournament sanctioned by the Balkan Badminton Association and Badminton Europe. The individual and mixed team events were held from 13 to 16 November 2014.

The tournament was held at Beroe Sports Hall in Stara Zagora, Bulgaria. The individual events consisted of over 200 players from eight countries in the Balkans while the team event only had six teams competing in the championships. Bulgaria won the mixed team event after defeating Turkey 3–0 in the final.

In the individual events, Bulgaria finished first with five gold medals, one silver and five bronze medals followed by Turkey with a gold medal, five silver medals and four bronze medals.

== Medal summary ==
=== Medalists ===
Event	Gold	Silver	Bronze
Men's singles	(Bulgaria) Blagovest Kisyov	(Turkey) Sinan Zorlu	(Turkey) Emre Vural
Men's singles	(Bulgaria) Blagovest Kisyov	(Turkey) Sinan Zorlu	(Bulgaria) Peyo Boichinov
Women's singles	(Turkey) Neslihan Yiğit	(Turkey) Özge Bayrak	(Turkey) Kader İnal
Women's singles	(Turkey) Neslihan Yiğit	(Turkey) Özge Bayrak	(Bulgaria) Linda Zetchiri
Men's doubles	(Bulgaria) Daniel Nikolov (Bulgaria) Ivan Panev	(Bulgaria) Peyo Boychinov (Bulgaria) Vladimir Shishkov	(Turkey) Yusuf Ramazan Bay (Turkey) Sinan Zorlu
Men's doubles	(Bulgaria) Daniel Nikolov (Bulgaria) Ivan Panev	(Bulgaria) Peyo Boychinov (Bulgaria) Vladimir Shishkov	(Bulgaria) Dimitar Delchev (Bulgaria) Stefan Garev
Women's doubles	(Bulgaria) Gabriela Stoeva (Bulgaria) Stefani Stoeva	(Turkey) Özge Bayrak (Turkey) Neslihan Yiğit	(Bulgaria) Mihaela Neycheva (Bulgaria) Anna-Maria Tsaneva
Women's doubles	(Bulgaria) Gabriela Stoeva (Bulgaria) Stefani Stoeva	(Turkey) Özge Bayrak (Turkey) Neslihan Yiğit	(Turkey) Neslihan Kılıç (Turkey) Ebru Yazgan
Mixed doubles	(Bulgaria) Blagovest Kisyov (Bulgaria) Gabriela Stoeva	(Turkey) Ramazan Öztürk (Turkey) Neslihan Kılıç	(Bulgaria) Stefan Garev (Bulgaria) Mila Ivanova
Mixed doubles	(Bulgaria) Blagovest Kisyov (Bulgaria) Gabriela Stoeva	(Turkey) Ramazan Öztürk (Turkey) Neslihan Kılıç	(Romania) Collins Valentine Filimon (Romania) Catalina Simionescu
Mixed team	Bulgaria; Peyo Boichinov; Dimitar Delchev; Stefan Garev; Blagovest Kisyov; Daniel Nikolov; Ivan Panev; Vladimir Shishkov; Mila Ivanova; Mihaela Neycheva; Gabriela Stoeva; Stefani Stoeva; Anna-Maria Tsaneva; Linda Zetchiri	Turkey; Yusuf Ramazan Bay; Ramazan Öztürk; Emre Vural; Sinan Zorlu; Özge Bayrak; Kader İnal; Neslihan Kılıç; Ebru Yazgan; Neslihan Yiğit	Romania; Collins Valentine Filimon; Blanita Alexandru; Soraia Askari; Andra Olariu; Catalina Simionescu
Mixed team	Bulgaria; Peyo Boichinov; Dimitar Delchev; Stefan Garev; Blagovest Kisyov; Daniel Nikolov; Ivan Panev; Vladimir Shishkov; Mila Ivanova; Mihaela Neycheva; Gabriela Stoeva; Stefani Stoeva; Anna-Maria Tsaneva; Linda Zetchiri	Turkey; Yusuf Ramazan Bay; Ramazan Öztürk; Emre Vural; Sinan Zorlu; Özge Bayrak; Kader İnal; Neslihan Kılıç; Ebru Yazgan; Neslihan Yiğit	Greece; Georgios Galvas; Panagiotis Skarlatos; Stamatis Tsigirdakis; Ilias Xanthou; Eleni Melikidou; Eleni Papadopoulou; Irini Tenta

=== Medal table ===
* Host nation (Bulgaria)

Rank	Nation	Gold	Silver	Bronze	Total
1	Bulgaria*	5	1	5	11
2	Turkey	1	5	4	10
3	Romania	0	0	2	2
4	Greece	0	0	1	1
Totals (4 entries)		6	6	12	24

== Team event ==
=== Group stage ===
==== Group A ====
Pos	Team	Pld	W	L	MF	MA	MD	Pts	Qualification
1	Bulgaria (H)	2	2	0	10	0	+10	2	Advance to knockout stage
2	Romania	2	1	1	5	5	0	1	Advance to knockout stage
3	North Macedonia	2	0	2	0	10	−10	0	

Source: nbp.bg
(H) Host

==== Group B ====
Pos	Team	Pld	W	L	MF	MA	MD	Pts	Qualification
1	Turkey	2	2	0	10	0	+10	2	Advance to knockout stage
2	Greece	2	1	1	3	7	−4	1	Advance to knockout stage
3	Moldova	2	0	2	2	8	−6	0	

Source: nbp.bg

=== Knockout stage ===
==== Bracket ====
Semi-finals
Bulgaria	3
Greece	0
Romania	0
Turkey	3

Final
Bulgaria	3
Turkey	0
