= Collins Valentine Filimon =

Romanian-born Austrian badminton player

Personal information
- Full name: Collins Valentine Filimon
- Born: 14 February 1998 (age 28) Bucharest, Romania
- Height: 1.90 m (6 ft 3 in)

Sport
- Country: Romania (2012–2021); Austria (2021–present)
- Sport: Badminton
- Handedness: Right

Men's singles
- Highest ranking: 84 (19 March 2024)
- Current ranking: 111 (31 July 2024)
- BWF profile
Medal record
Men's badminton
Representing Romania
Balkan Championships
Silver medal – second place	2016 Iași	Mixed team
Bronze medal – third place	2014 Stara Zagora	Mixed doubles
Bronze medal – third place	2016 Iași	Men's singles

Collins Valentine Filimon (born 14 February 1998) is a Romanian-born badminton player who is currently representing Austria. He plays for the ASKÖ Traun badminton club. He represented Austria in badminton at the 2024 Summer Olympics.

== Career ==
Filimon joined the Romanian national team in 2012. He won the boys' singles title at the Cyprus Junior International in 2014 and 2015. He also won a silver medal in mixed doubles at the 2015 U19 Balkan Badminton Championships with Catalina Simionescu. In 2016, Filimon reached the semi-finals of the Balkan Badminton Championships but had to settle for bronze after losing 16–21, 18–21 to Ivan Rusev of Bulgaria.

In 2019, Filimon represented Romania in the 2019 European Games men's singles event. He did not advance further after losing to Vladimir Malkov and Azmy Qowimuramadhoni in the group stage but won a match against Robert Mann of Luxembourg.

In September 2021, Filimon became a naturalized Austrian citizen and began playing for Austria in international tournaments. In 2022, he won his first international title at the Slovenia International after defeating Lin Kuan-ting of Chinese Taipei 21–17, 23–25, 21–12. In April 2024, he won his second title at the Malta International when he defeated Wolfgang Gnedt in an all Austrian encounter.

Filimon made his debut in men's singles at the 2024 Summer Olympics. In Group E, he faced fourth seed Anders Antonsen of Denmark and Ade Resky Dwicahyo of Azerbaijan. He lost his opening match to Antonsen 10–21, 18–21. He then lost his second match to Ade Resky Dwicahyo 18–21, 11–21 and was eliminated in the group stages.

== Achievements ==
=== Balkan Championships ===
Men's singles

Year	Venue	Opponent	Score	Result
2016	Sala Polivalentă Iași, Iași, Romania	(Bulgaria) Ivan Rusev	16–21, 18–21	Bronze

Mixed doubles

Year	Venue	Partner	Opponent	Score	Result
2014	Beroe Sports Hall, Stara Zagora, Bulgaria	(Romania) Cătălina Simionescu	(Bulgaria) Blagovest Kisyov (Bulgaria) Gabriela Stoeva	19–21, 18–21	Bronze

=== BWF International Challenge/Series (3 titles, 1 runner-up) ===
Men's singles

Year	Tournament	Opponent	Score	Result
2022	Slovenia International	(Chinese Taipei) Lin Kuan-ting	21–17, 23–25, 21–12	(gold) Winner
2024	Malta International	(Austria) Wolfgang Gnedt	19–21, 21–17, 21–11	(gold) Winner
2025	Czech International	(Turkey) Emre Lale	15–10, 15–7	(gold) Winner
2025	Welsh International	(Denmark) Ditlev Jæger Holm	10–21, 21–14, 5–21	(silver) Runner-up

BWF International Challenge tournament
BWF International Series tournament
BWF Future Series tournament
