= 2018 Balkan Badminton Championships =

Tournament details
- Dates: 18–20 May
- Venue: Nikos Samaras Indoor Hall
- Location: Orestiada, Greece

The 2018 Balkan Badminton Championships (Greek: Βαλκανικού Πρωταθλήματος Αντιπτέρισης 2018) was a badminton tournament sanctioned by the Balkan Badminton Association and Badminton Europe. The individual and mixed team events were held from 18 to 20 May 2018.

The tournament was held at Nikos Samaras Indoor Hall in Orestiada, Greece. A total of eight Balkan countries competed in the individual events while only six teams competed in the mixed team event. Bulgaria won first place in the mixed team event after beating Turkey in the final. Hosts Greece shared the bronze medal position with Serbia.

== Medal summary ==
=== Medalists ===
Event	Gold	Silver	Bronze
Men's singles	(Bulgaria) Daniel Nikolov	(Turkey) Emre Lale	(Bulgaria) Peyo Boichinov
Men's singles	(Bulgaria) Daniel Nikolov	(Turkey) Emre Lale	(Serbia) Luka Milić
Women's singles	(Turkey) Aliye Demirbağ	(Turkey) Neslihan Yiğit	(Bulgaria) Maria Delcheva
Women's singles	(Turkey) Aliye Demirbağ	(Turkey) Neslihan Yiğit	(Serbia) Marija Sudimac
Men's doubles	(Bulgaria) Daniel Nikolov (Bulgaria) Alex Vlaar	(Turkey) Muhammed Ali Kurt (Turkey) Emre Lale	(Greece) Georgios Galvas (Greece) Panagiotis Skarlatos
Men's doubles	(Bulgaria) Daniel Nikolov (Bulgaria) Alex Vlaar	(Turkey) Muhammed Ali Kurt (Turkey) Emre Lale	(Bulgaria) Peyo Boichinov (Bulgaria) Ivan Panev
Women's doubles	(Turkey) Aliye Demirbağ (Turkey) Neslihan Yiğit	(Turkey) Bengisu Erçetin (Turkey) Nazlıcan İnci	(Greece) Theodora Lamprianidou (Greece) Grammatoula Sotiriou
Women's doubles	(Turkey) Aliye Demirbağ (Turkey) Neslihan Yiğit	(Turkey) Bengisu Erçetin (Turkey) Nazlıcan İnci	(Serbia) Sara Lončar (Serbia) Nataša Pavlović
Mixed doubles	(Bulgaria) Alex Vlaar (Bulgaria) Dimitria Popstoikova	(Turkey) Emre Sönmez (Turkey) Zehra Erdem	(Greece) Stamatis Tsigirdakis (Greece) Eleni Moutevelidou
Mixed doubles	(Bulgaria) Alex Vlaar (Bulgaria) Dimitria Popstoikova	(Turkey) Emre Sönmez (Turkey) Zehra Erdem	(Serbia) Andrija Doder (Serbia) Marija Sudimac
Mixed team	Bulgaria; Peyo Boichinov; Daniel Nikolov; Ivan Panev; Alex Vlaar; Maria Delcheva; Hristomira Popovska; Dimitria Popstoikova	Turkey; Haktan Doğan; Serdar Koca; Muhammed Ali Kurt; Emre Lale; Serhat Salım; Emre Sönmez; Özge Bayrak; Aliye Demirbağ; Bengisu Erçetin; Zehra Erdem; Nazlıcan İnci; Neslihan Yiğit	Greece; Georgios Galvas; Panagiotis Skarlatos; Stamatis Tsigirdakis; Ilias Xanthou; Eleni Moutevelidou; Elisavet Nioti; Grammatoula Sotiriou; Irini Tenta
Mixed team	Bulgaria; Peyo Boichinov; Daniel Nikolov; Ivan Panev; Alex Vlaar; Maria Delcheva; Hristomira Popovska; Dimitria Popstoikova	Turkey; Haktan Doğan; Serdar Koca; Muhammed Ali Kurt; Emre Lale; Serhat Salım; Emre Sönmez; Özge Bayrak; Aliye Demirbağ; Bengisu Erçetin; Zehra Erdem; Nazlıcan İnci; Neslihan Yiğit	Serbia; Igor Bjelan; Andrija Doder; Luka Milić; Nenad Milošević; Sara Lončar; Nataša Pavlović; Marija Sudimac

=== Medal table ===
* Host nation (Greece)

Rank	Nation	Gold	Silver	Bronze	Total
1	Bulgaria	4	0	3	7
2	Turkey	2	6	0	8
3	Serbia	0	0	5	5
4	Greece*	0	0	4	4
Totals (4 entries)		6	6	12	24

== Team event ==
=== Group stage ===
==== Group A ====
Pos	Team	Pld	W	L	MF	MA	MD	GF	GA	GD	PF	PA	PD	Pts	Qualification
1	Bulgaria	2	2	0	9	1	+8	18	3	+15	408	293	+115	2	Knockout stage
2	Greece (H)	2	1	1	3	7	−4	8	14	−6	354	397	−43	1	Knockout stage
3	Moldova	2	0	2	3	7	−4	6	15	−9	330	402	−72	0	

Source: TournamentSoftware.com
(H) Host

Moldova
2
Nikos Samaras Indoor Hall, Court 1
18 May 2018, 09:20 UTC+2

Greece
3

			1	2	3
1	(Moldova) (Greece)	Alexandru Morari; Stamatis Tsigirdakis	12; 21	6; 21
2	(Moldova) (Greece)	Vlada Ginga; Grammatoula Sotiriou	21; 19	21; 12
3	(Moldova) (Greece)	Maxim Carpenco / Alexandru Morari; Georgios Galvas / Panagiotis Skarlatos	16; 21	17; 21
4	(Moldova) (Greece)	Anna Cernetchi / Vlada Ginga; Eleni Moutevelidou / Irini Tenta	19; 21	21; 16	21; 15
5	(Moldova) (Greece)	Maxim Carpenco / Anna Cernetchi; Elisavet Nioti / Ilias Xanthou	13; 21	15; 21

Bulgaria
5
Nikos Samaras Indoor Hall, Court 1
18 May 2018, 11:40 UTC+2

Greece
0

			1	2	3
1	(Bulgaria) (Greece)	Daniel Nikolov; Ilias Xanthou	21; 23	21; 13	5; 0	retired
2	(Bulgaria) (Greece)	Maria Delcheva; Grammatoula Sotiriou	21; 16	21; 15
3	(Bulgaria) (Greece)	Peyo Boichinov / Alex Vlaar; Georgios Galvas / Panagiotis Skarlatos	21; 11	21; 19
4	(Bulgaria) (Greece)	Hristomira Popovska / Dimitria Popstoykova; Eleni Moutevelidou / Irini Tenta	21; 14	21; 8
5	(Bulgaria) (Greece)	Alex Vlaar / Dimitria Popstoykova; Stamatis Tsigirdakis / Eleni Moutevelidou	21; 9	21; 17

Bulgaria
4
Nikos Samaras Indoor Hall, Court 1
18 May 2018, 14:10 UTC+2

Moldova
1

			1	2	3
1	(Bulgaria) (Moldova)	Daniel Nikolov; Alexandru Morari	21; 6	21; 14
2	(Bulgaria) (Moldova)	Hristomira Popovska; Vlada Ginga	16; 21	9; 21
3	(Bulgaria) (Moldova)	Peyo Boichinov / Alex Vlaar; Pietr Cunev / Igor Uscov	21; 18	21; 11
4	(Bulgaria) (Moldova)	Hristomira Popovska / Dimitria Popstoykova; Anna Cernetchi / Ecaterina Fedotcenco	21; 14	21; 12
5	(Bulgaria) (Moldova)	Alex Vlaar / Dimitria Popstoykova; Alexandru Morari / Vlada Ginga	21; 18	21; 13

==== Group B ====
Pos	Team	Pld	W	L	MF	MA	MD	GF	GA	GD	PF	PA	PD	Pts	Qualification
1	Turkey	2	2	0	9	1	+8	18	4	+14	441	265	+176	2	Knockout stage
2	Serbia	2	1	1	6	4	+2	14	10	+4	416	397	+19	1	Knockout stage
3	Greece B	2	0	2	0	10	−10	2	20	−18	266	461	−195	0	

Source: TournamentSoftware.com

Turkey
5
Nikos Samaras Indoor Hall, Court 2
18 May 2018, 09:20 UTC+2

Greece B
0

			1	2	3
1	(Turkey) (Greece)	Emre Lale; Petros Tentas	21; 18	21; 14
2	(Turkey) (Greece)	Özge Bayrak; Eleni Melikidou	21; 7	21; 5
3	(Turkey) (Greece)	Serdar Koca / Serhat Salım; Paschalis Melikidis / Achilleas Tsartsidis	21; 7	21; 16
4	(Turkey) (Greece)	Bengisu Erçetin / Nazlıcan İnci; Theodora Lamprianidou / Eleni Melikidou	21; 6	21; 12
5	(Turkey) (Greece)	Emre Sönmez / Zehra Erdem; Petros Tentas / Irini Gougleri	21; 6	21; 9

Serbia
5
Nikos Samaras Indoor Hall, Court 2
18 May 2018, 11:40 UTC+2

Greece B
0

			1	2	3
1	(Serbia) (Greece)	Andrija Doder; Georgios Tsiolis	21; 13	21; 10
2	(Serbia) (Greece)	Sara Lončar; Eleni Melikidou	21; 15	21; 2
3	(Serbia) (Greece)	Luka Milić / Nenad Milošević; Nikolaos Koulakidis / Achilleas Tsartsidis	21; 7	21; 17
4	(Serbia) (Greece)	Sara Lončar / Marija Sudimac; Theodora Lamprianidou / Theodora Lamprianidou	19; 21	21; 11	21; 18
5	(Serbia) (Greece)	Igor Bjelan / Nataša Pavlović; Petros Tentas / Irini Gougleri	22; 24	21; 12	21; 16

Serbia
1
Nikos Samaras Indoor Hall, Court 2
18 May 2018, 14:10 UTC+2

Turkey
4

			1	2	3
1	(Serbia) (Turkey)	Luka Milić; Haktan Doğan	21; 11	21; 15
2	(Serbia) (Turkey)	Sara Lončar; Neslihan Yiğit	6; 21	11; 21
3	(Serbia) (Turkey)	Igor Bjelan / Andrija Doder; Serdar Koca / Serhat Salım	21; 18	15; 21	9; 21
4	(Serbia) (Turkey)	Sara Lončar / Nataša Pavlović; Bengisu Erçetin / Nazlıcan İnci	8; 21	5; 21
5	(Serbia) (Turkey)	Igor Bjelan / Marija Sudimac; Emre Sönmez / Zehra Erdem	14; 21	21; 19	13; 21

=== Knockout stage ===
==== Bracket ====
Semi-finals
Bulgaria	3
Serbia	0
Greece	0
Turkey	3

Final
Bulgaria	3
Turkey	2

==== Semi-finals ====
Bulgaria
3
Nikos Samaras Indoor Hall, Court 1
18 May 2018, 16:15 UTC+2

Serbia
0

			1	2	3
1	(Bulgaria) (Serbia)	Daniel Nikolov; Luka Milić	21; 18	18; 21	23; 21
2	(Bulgaria) (Serbia)	Maria Delcheva; Marija Sudimac	22; 20	21; 18
3	(Bulgaria) (Serbia)	Hristomira Popovska / Dimitria Popstoykova; Sara Lončar / Nataša Pavlović	21; 12	21; 12
4	(Bulgaria) (Serbia)	Peyo Boichinov / Alex Vlaar; Luka Milić / Nenad Milošević				not played
5	(Bulgaria) (Serbia)	Alex Vlaar / Dimitria Popstoykova; Andrija Doder / Marija Sudimac				not played

Greece
0
Nikos Samaras Indoor Hall, Court 2
18 May 2018, 16:15 UTC+2

Turkey
3

			1	2	3
1	(Greece) (Turkey)	Stamatis Tsigirdakis; Muhammed Ali Kurt	13; 21	12; 21
2	(Greece) (Turkey)	Grammatoula Sotiriou; Aliye Demirbağ	11; 21	10; 21
3	(Greece) (Turkey)	Eleni Moutevelidou / Irini Tenta; Bengisu Erçetin / Nazlıcan İnci	9; 21	9; 21
4	(Greece) (Turkey)	Georgios Galvas / Panagiotis Skarlatos; Serdar Koca / Serhat Salım				not played
5	(Greece) (Turkey)	Panagiotis Skarlatos / Irini Tenta; Emre Sönmez / Zehra Erdem				not played

==== Final ====
Bulgaria
3
Nikos Samaras Indoor Hall, Court 1
18 May 2018, 21:30 UTC+2

Turkey
2

			1	2	3
1	(Bulgaria) (Turkey)	Daniel Nikolov; Emre Lale	16; 21	21; 17	25; 23
2	(Bulgaria) (Turkey)	Maria Delcheva; Özge Bayrak	21; 19	9; 21	13; 21
3	(Bulgaria) (Turkey)	Peyo Boichinov / Alex Vlaar; Serdar Koca / Serhat Salım	21; 13	15; 21	21; 10
4	(Bulgaria) (Turkey)	Hristomira Popovska / Dimitria Popstoykova; Bengisu Erçetin / Nazlıcan İnci	10; 21	14; 21
5	(Bulgaria) (Turkey)	Alex Vlaar / Dimitria Popstoykova; Emre Sönmez / Zehra Erdem	24; 22	20; 22	21; 17
