= 2016 Balkan Badminton Championships =

Tournament details
- Dates: 9–11 September
- Venue: Sala Polivalentă Iași
- Location: Iași, Romania

The 2016 Balkan Badminton Championships (Romanian: Campionatele Balcanice de Badminton 2016) was a badminton tournament sanctioned by the Balkan Badminton Association and Badminton Europe. The individual and mixed team events were held from 9 to 11 September 2016.

The tournament was held at Sala Polivalentă Iași located in Iași, Romania. Four countries took part in the tournament.

The team event was played in a round-robin format with only four teams playing. Bulgaria finished in first place with 3 wins against their opponents, followed by hosts Romania with 2 wins and a loss. Serbia earned the bronze medal with 1 win and 2 losses while Moldova finished in fourth place.

== Medal summary ==
=== Medalists ===
Event	Gold	Silver	Bronze
Men's singles	(Bulgaria) Ivan Rusev	(Bulgaria) Daniel Nikolov	(Romania) Collins Valentine Filimon
Men's singles	(Bulgaria) Ivan Rusev	(Bulgaria) Daniel Nikolov	(Serbia) Dragoslav Petrović
Women's singles	(Bulgaria) Maria Delcheva	(Romania) Ioana Grecea	(Romania) Sonia Olariu
Women's singles	(Bulgaria) Maria Delcheva	(Romania) Ioana Grecea	(Romania) Andra Olariu
Men's doubles	(Bulgaria) Daniel Nikolov (Bulgaria) Ivan Rusev	(Romania) Robert Ciobotaru (Romania) Daniel Cojocaru	(Bulgaria) Ivan Panev (Bulgaria) Dimitar Yanakiev
Men's doubles	(Bulgaria) Daniel Nikolov (Bulgaria) Ivan Rusev	(Romania) Robert Ciobotaru (Romania) Daniel Cojocaru	(Serbia) Ilija Pavlović (Serbia) Borko Petrović
Women's doubles	(Bulgaria) Maria Delcheva (Romania) Alexandra Milon	(Romania) Andra Olariu (Romania) Sonia Olariu	(Romania) Ioana Grecea (Romania) Irina Popescu
Women's doubles	(Bulgaria) Maria Delcheva (Romania) Alexandra Milon	(Romania) Andra Olariu (Romania) Sonia Olariu	(Serbia) Milica Simić (Serbia) Marija Sudimac
Mixed doubles	(Romania) Daniel Cojocaru (Romania) Alexandra Milon	(Serbia) Igor Bjelan (Serbia) Milica Simić	(Romania) Mihai Grosu (Romania) Irina Popescu
Mixed doubles	(Romania) Daniel Cojocaru (Romania) Alexandra Milon	(Serbia) Igor Bjelan (Serbia) Milica Simić	(Bulgaria) Zhivko Dimitrov (Bulgaria) Paula Kirova
Mixed team	Bulgaria; Zhivko Dimitrov; Daniel Nikolov; Ivan Panev; Ivan Rusev; Dimitar Yanakiev; Maria Delcheva; Paula Kirova	Romania; Mugur Barbu; Robert Ciobotaru; Daniel Cojocaru; Collins Valentine Filimon; Artur Trosin; Mihai Grosu; Ioana Grecea; Alexandra Milon; Andra Olariu; Sonia Olariu; Alina Popa; Irina Popescu	Serbia; Igor Bjelan; Luka Milić; Ilija Pavlović; Borko Petrović; Dragoslav Petrović; Milica Simić; Marija Sudimac

=== Medal table ===
* Host nation (Romania)

Rank	Nation	Gold	Silver	Bronze	Total
1	Bulgaria	4.5	1	2	7.5
2	Romania*	1.5	4	5	10.5
3	Serbia	0	1	4	5
Totals (3 entries)		6	6	11	23

== Team event ==
=== Round robin ===
Team	Pld	W	L	MF	MA	MD	Pts	Qualification
Bulgaria	3	3	0	13	2	+11	3	Champions
Romania	3	2	1	8	7	+1	2	Runners-up
Serbia	3	1	2	7	8	−1	1	Third place
Moldova	3	0	3	0	15	−15	0	Fourth place

Bulgaria	4–1	Romania
Bulgaria	4–1	Serbia
Bulgaria	5–0	Moldova
Romania	3–2	Serbia
Romania	5–0	Moldova
Serbia	5–0	Moldova
