= Turkey national badminton team =

National badminton team representing Turkey

Turkey
- Association: Türkiye Badminton Federasyonu (TBF)
- Confederation: BE (Europe)
- President: Murat Özmekik

BWF ranking
- Current ranking: 19 ▲2 (6 October 2026)
- Highest ranking: 18 (2 January 2019)

Sudirman Cup
- Appearances: 6 (first in 2003)
- Best result: Group stage

Uber Cup
- Appearances: 1 (first in 2026)
- Best result: Group stage

European Mixed Team Championships
- Appearances: 1 (first in 2013)
- Best result: Group stage

European Men's Team Championships
- Appearances: 7 (first in 2004)
- Best result: Group stage

European Women's Team Championships
- Appearances: 9 (first in 2004)
- Best result: Semi-finals (2026)

Helvetia Cup
- Appearances: 1 (first in 2001)
- Best result: Group stage (2001)

The Turkey national badminton team (Turkish: Türkiye milli badminton takımı) represents Turkey in international badminton team competitions. It is controlled by the Turkish Badminton Federation (Turkish: Türkiye Badminton Federasyonu), the national organization for badminton in Turkey. The Turkey national team have never competed in the Thomas Cup and the Uber Cup.

Turkey have competed multiple times at the Sudirman Cup. The Turkey women's team had entered three consecutive quarterfinals at the European Women's Team Badminton Championships from 2016 to 2020.

In individual events, Turkey has won three bronze medals at the European Badminton Championships, most of them won by Neslihan Yiğit and Özge Bayrak. Yiğit and Bayrak also won Turkey's first ever badminton medal in the European Games.

== Competitive record ==
=== Thomas Cup ===
Year	Round	Pos
1949 to 1992	Did not enter	
1994	Withdrew	
1996	Did not enter	
1998	Did not enter	
2000	Did not enter	
2002	Did not enter	
2004	Did not qualify	
2006	Did not qualify	
2008	Did not qualify	
2010	Did not enter	
2012	Did not enter	
2014	Did not enter	
2016	Did not qualify	
2018	Did not qualify	
2020	Did not qualify	
2022	Did not enter	
2024	Did not enter	
2026	Did not qualify	
2028	To be determined	
2030	To be determined	

=== Uber Cup ===
Year	Round	Pos
1957 to 1992	Did not enter	
1994	Did not qualify	
1996	Did not enter	
1998	Did not enter	
2000	Did not enter	
2002	Did not enter	
2004	Did not qualify	
2006	Did not qualify	
2008	Did not qualify	
2010	Did not enter	
2012	Did not enter	
2014	Did not qualify	
2016	Did not qualify	
2018	Did not qualify	
2020	Did not qualify	
2022	Did not enter	
2024	Did not qualify	
2026	Group stage	10th
2028	To be determined	
2030	To be determined	

=== Sudirman Cup ===
Year	Round	Pos
1989 to 2001	Did not enter	
2003	Group stage	48th
2005	Group stage	37th
2007	Group stage	46th
2009	Group stage	32nd
2011	Did not enter	
2013	Group stage	29th
2015	Group stage	25th
2017	Did not enter	
2019	Did not enter	
2021	Did not enter	
2023	Did not enter	
2025	Did not enter	
2027	To be determined	
2029	To be determined	

=== European Team Championships ===
==== Men's team ====
Year	Round	Pos
2004	Group stage	31st
2006	Group stage	27th
2008	Group stage	28th
2010	Did not enter	
2012	Did not enter	
2014	Did not enter	
2016	Group stage	22nd
2018	Group stage	11th
2020	Group stage	22nd
2024	Did not enter	
2026	Group stage	8th
2028	To be determined	
2030	To be determined	

==== Women's team ====
Year	Round	Pos
2004	Group stage	20th
2006	Group stage	26th
2008	Group stage	25th
2010	Did not enter	
2012	Did not enter	
2014	Group stage	14th
2016	Quarter-finals	7th
2018	Quarter-finals	7th
2020	Quarter-finals	5th
2024	Group stage	6th
2026	Semi-finals	3rd
2028	To be determined	
2030	To be determined	

==== Mixed team ====
Year	Round	Pos
1972 to 2011	Did not enter	
2013	Group stage	15th
2015	Did not enter	
2017	Did not enter	
2019	Did not enter	
2021	Did not enter	
2023	Did not enter	
2025	Did not qualify	
2027	To be determined	
2029	To be determined	

=== Helvetia Cup ===
Year	Round	Pos
1962 to 1999	Did not enter	
2001	Group stage	18th
2003	Did not enter	
2005	Did not enter	
2007	Did not enter	

=== Islamic Solidarity Games ===
==== Men's team ====
Year	Round	Pos
2013	Third place	3rd

==== Women's team ====
Year	Round	Pos
2013	Third place	3rd

=== Balkan Team Championships ===
==== Mixed team ====
Year	Round	Pos
1992	Third place	3rd
1993	Third place	3rd
1995	Third place	3rd
1997	Third place	3rd
1998	Fifth place	5th
1999	Fourth place	4th
2000	Third place	3rd
2001	Third place	3rd
2002	Third place	3rd
2003	Third place	3rd
2004	Third place	3rd
2005	Group stage	5th
2006	Runners-up	2nd
2007	Runners-up	2nd
2008	Third place	3rd
2009	Runners-up	2nd
2010	Runners-up	2nd
2011	Runners-up	2nd
2012	Champions	1st
2013	Runners-up	2nd
2014	Runners-up	2nd
2016	Did not enter	
2018	Runners-up	2nd

=== Mediterranean Team Championships ===
==== Mixed team ====
Year	Round	Pos
2019	Did not enter	

**Red border color indicates tournament was held on home soil.

== Junior competitive record ==
=== Suhandinata Cup ===
Year	Round	Pos
2000	Did not enter	
2002	Did not enter	
2004	Did not enter	
2006	Group stage	16th
2007	Group stage	15th
2008	Group stage	19th
2009	Did not enter	
2010	Group stage	17th
2011	Group stage	12th
2012	Group stage	23rd
2013	Group stage	20th
2014	Did not enter	
2015	Group stage	21st
2016	Did not enter	
2017	Did not enter	
2018	Did not enter	
2019	Did not enter	
2020	Cancelled because of COVID-19 pandemic	
2021	Cancelled because of COVID-19 pandemic	
2022	Withdrew	
2023	Did not enter	
2024	Group stage	14th
2025	Group stage	11th of 36
2026	Group stage	12th of 47

=== European Junior Team Championships ===
==== Mixed team ====
Year	Round	Pos
1975	Did not enter	
1977	Did not enter	
1979	Did not enter	
1981	Did not enter	
1983	Did not enter	
1985	Did not enter	
1987	Did not enter	
1989	Did not enter	
1991	Did not enter	
1993	Did not enter	
1995	Did not enter	
1997	Did not qualify	
1999	Did not qualify	
2001	Did not qualify	
2003	Did not qualify	
2005	Did not qualify	
2007	Group stage	14th
2009	Group stage	15th
2011	Quarter-finals	6th
2013	Quarter-finals	5th
2015	Quarter-finals	6th
2017	Group stage	10th
2018	Quarter-finals	5th
2020	Did not enter	
2022	Group stage	13th
2024	Quarter-finals	5/8
2026	Semi-finals	3rd

=== Finlandia Cup ===
==== Mixed team ====
Year	Round	Pos
1984	Did not enter	
1986	Did not enter	
1988	Did not enter	
1990	Did not enter	
1992	Did not enter	
1994	Did not enter	
1996	Group stage	15th
1998	Group stage	23rd
2000	Group stage	19th
2002	Group stage	18th
2004	Group stage	6th
2006	Third place	3rd

=== Balkan Junior Team Championships ===
==== Mixed team ====
Year	Round	Pos
1992	Third place	3rd
1993	Third place	3rd
1994	Third place	3rd
1995	Third place	3rd
1996	Runners-up	2nd
1997	Third place	3rd
1998	Third place	3rd
1999	Fourth place	4th
2000	Third place	3rd
2001	Did not enter	
2002	Did not enter	
2004	Runners-up	2nd
2005	Runners-up	2nd
2006	Champions	1st
2007	Runners-up	2nd
2008	Champions	1st
2010	Champions	1st
2011	Runners-up	2nd
2012	Runners-up	2nd
2013	Runners-up	2nd
2015	Champions	1st
2016	Champions	1st
2017	Champions	1st
2019	Champions	1st

=== Mediterranean Junior Team Championships ===
==== Mixed team ====
Year	Round	Pos
2015	Champions	1st
2017	Champions	1st

**Red border color indicates tournament was held on home soil.

== Players ==
=== Current squad ===
==== Men's team ====
As of 11 February 2026

Name	DoB/Age	World rank			Ref.
Name	DoB/Age	MS	MD	XD	Ref.
Buğra Aktaş	15 May 2006 (age 20)	-	195	244	
Arda Doğaç Atan	29 August 2007 (age 19)	980	1199	-	
Taha Emirhan Budak	2 October 2003 (age 23)	-	450	525	
Gökay Göl	12 March 2008 (age 18)	-	536	676	
Emre Lale	14 October 1993 (age 33)	416	180	180	
Abdulsamet Özdemir	1 January 2003 (age 23)	-	386	1242	
Nurullah Saraç	6 February 2003 (age 23)	423	1079	-	
Mert Seven	8 February 2008 (age 18)	-	471	468	
Emre Sönmez	24 July 1999 (age 27)	-	194	65	
Veysel Taşdemir	19 February 2007 (age 19)	656	-	-	
Mehmet Can Töremiş	4 February 2008 (age 18)	-	841	1197	
Yusuf Yaşar	25 May 1999 (age 27)	745	-	-	

==== Women's team ====
As of 11 February 2026

Name	DoB/Age	World rank			Ref.
Name	DoB/Age	WS	WD	XD	Ref.
Neslihan Arın	26 February 1994 (age 32)	35	-	-	
Özge Bayrak	14 February 1992 (age 34)	87	-	-	
Yasemen Bektaş	12 August 2003 (age 23)	-	130	71	
Ravza Bodur	30 August 2006 (age 20)	311	-	-	
Nisa Nur Çimen	19 January 2008 (age 18)	-	532	676	
Elifnur Demir	24 July 2008 (age 18)	469	398	-	
Bengisu Erçetin	1 January 2001 (age 25)	-	37	-	
Zehra Erdem	23 June 2001 (age 25)	263	-	841	
Nazlıcan İnci	6 March 2000 (age 26)	37	-	-	
Aleyna Korkut	8 April 2008 (age 18)	485	-	-	
İkra Elif Özyiğit	10 November 2006 (age 20)	-	413	1272	
Sinem Yıldız	3 April 2006 (age 20)	-	130	244	

=== Previous squads ===
==== European Team Championships ====
- Men's team: 2020
- Women's team: 2020
