= Serbian National Badminton Championships =

The Serbian National Badminton Championships is a tournament organized to crown the best badminton players in Serbia. They are held since 2007.

== Past winners ==
Year	Men's singles	Women's singles	Men's doubles	Women's doubles	Mixed doubles
2007	Radomir Jovović	Ana Zorić	Radomir Jovović; Mladen Stanković	Mirjana Bulatović; Jelena Obrić	Radomir Jovović; Ana Zorić
2008	Igor Bjelan	Milica Simić	Nikola Marjanović; Vladimir Savić	Ana Zorić; Sara Samardžić	Nikola Mijačić; Stefana Stanković
2009	Nikola Marjanović	Milica Simić	Nikola Marjanović; Vladimir Savić	Stefana Stanković; Mirjana Vasić	Nikola Mijačić; Stefan Stanković
2010	Ilija Pavlović	Milica Simić	Ilija Pavlović; Igor Bjelan	Sandra Halilović; Milica Simić	Igor Bjelan; Sandra Halilović
2011	Igor Bjelan	Milica Simić	Ilija Pavlović; Igor Bjelan	Sandra Halilović; Milica Simić	Ilija Pavlović; Milica Simić
2012	Igor Bjelan	Milica Simić	Miodrag Kaličanin; Borko Petrović	Sandra Halilović; Milica Simić	Ilija Pavlović; Milica Simić
2013	Ilija Pavlović	Milica Simić	Ilija Pavlović; Igor Bjelan	Milica Simić; Sandra Halilović	Ilija Pavlović; Milica Simić
2014	Igor Bjelan	Milica Simić	Miodrag Kalicanin; Borko Petrović	Milica Simić; Bojana Jovanovic	Ilija Pavlović; Milica Simić
2015	Dragoslav Petrović	Milica Simić	Ilija Pavlović; Igor Bjelan	Milica Simić; Bojana Jovanovic	Borko Petrović; Anja Janić
2016	Dragoslav Petrović	Marija Sudimac	Miodrag Kaličanin; Borko Petrović	Milica Simić; Bojana Jovanovic	Igor Bjelan; Milica Simić
2017	Luka Milić	Marija Sudimac	Andrija Doder; Luka Milić	Nataša Pavlović; Marija Sudimac	Luka Milić; Milica Simić
2018	Luka Milić	Marija Sudimac	Andrija Doder; Luka Milić	Sara Lončar; Marija Sudimac	Andrija Doder; Marija Sudimac
2019	Luka Milić	Marija Sudimac	Nenad Milošević; Luka Milić	Sara Lončar; Marija Sudimac	Andrija Doder; Marija Sudimac
2020	Luka Milić	Sara Lončar	Andrija Doder; Mihajlo Tomić	Anđela Vitman; Mihajlo Tomić	Mihajlo Tomić; Anđela Vitman
2021	Luka Milić	Marija Sudimac	Andrija Doder; Mihajlo Tomić	Sara Lončar; Marija Sudimac	Mihajlo Tomić; Anđela Vitman
2022	Sergej Lukić	Marija Sudimac	Igor Bjelan; Sergej Lukić	Sanja Perić; Anđela Vitman	Mihajlo Tomić; Anđela Vitman
2023	Viktor Petrović	Marija Sudimac	Viktor Petrović; Mihajlo Tomić	Sara Lončar; Marija Sudimac	Mihajlo Tomić; Anđela Vitman
2024	Luka Milić	Marija Sudimac	Viktor Petrović; Mihajlo Tomić	Sara Lončar; Marija Sudimac	Mihajlo Tomić; Anđela Vitman
2025	Viktor Petrović	Marija Sudimac	Viktor Petrović; Mihajlo Tomić	Sanja Perić; Anđela Vitman	Mihajlo Tomić; Anđela Vitman
