= Bosnia and Herzegovina National Badminton Championships =

Bosnia and Herzegovina National Badminton Championships are held since the year 2008.

== Past winners ==
Year	Men's singles	Women's singles	Men's doubles	Women's doubles	Mixed doubles
2008	Aleksandar Egić	Milana Kozomora	Aleksandar Egić; Miroslav Kočić	Milana Kozomora; Nikolina Čenić	Miroslav Kočić; Biljana Novaković
2009	Aleksandar Egić	Milana Kozomora	Aleksandar Egić; Miroslav Kočić	Milana Kozomora; Biljana Novaković	Slobodan Stijaković; Milana Kozomora
2010					
2016	Miroslav Kocić	Ksenija Marinković	No competition		

== Junior champions ==
Year	Men's singles	Women's singles	Men's doubles	Women's doubles	Mixed doubles
2008	Miloš Tomić	Adrijana Savić	Miloš Tomić; Stefan Pavičić	Adrijana Savić; Elena Kevac	Miloš Tomić; Adrijana Savić
2009	Slobodan Stijaković	Adrijana Savić	Miloš Tomić; Slobodan Stijaković	Danijela Zeljković; Lenka Grahovac	Miloš Tomić; Danijela Zeljković
2010					
