= Bulgaria national badminton team =

National badminton team representing Bulgaria

Bulgaria
- Association: Bulgarian Badminton Federation (BFB)
- Confederation: BE (Europe)
- President: Volodya Zlatev

BWF ranking
- Current ranking: 20 ▼1 (6 October 2026)
- Highest ranking: 16 (5 July 2018)

Sudirman Cup
- Appearances: 12 (first in 1989)
- Best result: Group stage

Uber Cup
- Appearances: 2 (first in 2016)
- Best result: Group stage

European Mixed Team Championships
- Appearances: 17 (first in 1986)
- Best result: Quarter-finals (2011)

European Men's Team Championships
- Appearances: 8 (first in 2006)
- Best result: Quarter-finals (2020)

European Women's Team Championships
- Appearances: 9 (first in 2006)
- Best result: Champions (2026)

Helvetia Cup
- Appearances: 5 (first in 1987)
- Best result: Runners-up (1995)

The Bulgaria national badminton team (Bulgarian: Националния отбор на България по бадминтон) represents Bulgaria in international badminton team competitions and is controlled by the Bulgarian Badminton Federation (Bulgarian: Българска Федерация Бадминтон). The Bulgarian women's team achieved second place in the 2016 European Men's and Women's Team Badminton Championships, they were semifinalists two years prior.

The Bulgarian team have won a gold and a bronze medal at the European Games. National women's doubles specialists Gabriela Stoeva and Stefani Stoeva are the first Bulgarian players to enter the top 10 in the BWF World Ranking. The women's team made its Uber Cup debut in 2016.

== Competitive record ==
=== Thomas Cup ===
Year	Round	Pos
1949	Did not enter	
1952	Did not enter	
1955	Did not enter	
1958	Did not enter	
1961	Did not enter	
1964	Did not enter	
1967	Did not enter	
1970	Did not enter	
1973	Did not enter	
1976	Did not enter	
1979	Did not enter	
1982	Did not enter	
1984	Did not enter	
1986	Did not enter	
1988	Did not enter	
1990	Did not qualify	
1992	Did not qualify	
1994	Did not qualify	
1996	Did not qualify	
1998	Did not qualify	
2000	Did not qualify	
2002	Did not qualify	
2004	Did not qualify	
2006	Did not qualify	
2008	Did not qualify	
2010	Did not qualify	
2012	Did not qualify	
2014	Did not qualify	
2016	Did not qualify	
2018	Did not qualify	
2020	Did not qualify	
2022	Did not qualify	
2024	Did not enter	
2026	Did not qualify	
2028	TBD	
2030	TBD	

=== Uber Cup ===
Year	Round	Pos
1957	Did not enter	
1960	Did not enter	
1963	Did not enter	
1966	Did not enter	
1969	Did not enter	
1972	Did not enter	
1975	Did not enter	
1978	Did not enter	
1981	Did not enter	
1984	Did not enter	
1986	Did not enter	
1988	Did not enter	
1990	Did not qualify	
1992	Did not qualify	
1994	Did not qualify	
1996	Did not qualify	
1998	Did not qualify	
2000	Did not qualify	
2002	Did not qualify	
2004	Did not qualify	
2006	Did not qualify	
2008	Did not qualify	
2010	Did not qualify	
2012	Did not qualify	
2014	Did not qualify	
2016	Group stage	14th
2018	Did not qualify	
2020	Did not qualify	
2022	Did not qualify	
2024	Did not enter	
2026	Group stage	12th
2028	TBD	
2030	TBD	

=== Sudirman Cup ===
Year	Round	Pos
1989	Group stage	26th
1991	Group stage	26th
1993	Group stage	28th
1995	Group stage	29th
1997	Group stage	29th
1999	Group stage	24th
2001	Group stage	26th
2003	Group stage	18th
2005	Group stage	23rd
2007	Group stage	28th
2009	Group stage	18th
2011	Group stage	27th
2013	Did not enter	
2015	Did not enter	
2017	Did not enter	
2019	Did not enter	
2021	Did not enter	
2023	Did not qualify	
2025	TBD	
2027	TBD	
2029	TBD	

=== European Team Championships ===
==== Men's team ====
Year	Round	Pos
2006	Group stage	9/16
2008	Group stage	17/22
2010	Group stage	23/28
2012	Group stage	9/16
2014	Group stage	13/18
2016	Group stage	9/12
2018	Group stage	9/14
2020	Quarter-finals	5/8
2024	Did not qualify	
2026	Did not qualify	
2028	To be determined	
2030	To be determined	

==== Women's team ====
Year	Round	Pos
2006	Group stage	8/14
2008	Group stage	9/14
2010	Quarter-finals	5/6
2012	Quarter-finals	9/16
2014	Semi-finals	4th
2016	Runners-up	2nd
2018	Quarter-finals	5/8
2020	Group stage	9/14
2024	Did not qualify	
2026	Champions	1st
2028	TBD	
2030	TBD	

==== Mixed team ====
Year	Round	Pos
1972	Did not enter	
1974	Did not enter	
1976	Did not enter	
1978	Did not enter	
1980	Did not enter	
1982	Did not enter	
1984	Did not enter	
1986	Group stage	19th
1988	Group stage	18th
1990	Group stage	17th
1992	Group stage	14th
1994	Group stage	16th
1996	Group stage	11th
1998	Group stage	9th
2000	Group stage	8th
2002	Group stage	11th
2004	Group stage	13th
2006	Group stage	13th
2008	Group stage	10th
2009	Group stage	9/16
2011	Quarter-finals	5/8
2013	Group stage	9/16
2015	Did not qualify	
2017	Group stage	9/12
2019	Did not qualify	
2021	Did not qualify	
2023	Group stage	7th
2025	Did not qualify	
2027	TBD	
2029	TBD	

=== Helvetia Cup ===
Year	Round	Pos
1962	Did not enter	
1963	Did not enter	
1964	Did not enter	
1965	Did not enter	
1966	Did not enter	
1967	Did not enter	
1968	Did not enter	
1969	Did not enter	
1970	Did not enter	
1971	Did not enter	
1973	Did not enter	
1975	Did not enter	
1977	Did not enter	
1979	Did not enter	
1981	Did not enter	
1983	Did not enter	
1985	Did not enter	
1987	Group stage	12th
1989	Group stage	10th
1991	Group stage	5th
1993	Group stage	8th
1995	Runners-up	2nd
1997	Did not enter	
1999	Did not enter	
2001	Did not enter	
2003	Did not enter	
2005	Did not enter	
2007	Did not enter	

=== Balkan Team Championships ===
==== Mixed team ====
Year	Round	Pos
1992	Champions	1st
1993	Champions	1st
1995	Champions	1st
1997	Champions	1st
1998	Champions	1st
1999	Champions	1st
2000	Champions	1st
2001	Champions	1st
2002	Champions	1st
2003	Champions	1st
2004	Champions	1st
2005	Champions	1st
2006	Champions	1st
2007	Champions	1st
2008	Champions	1st
2009	Champions	1st
2010	Champions	1st
2011	Champions	1st
2012	Runners-up	2nd
2013	Champions	1st
2014	Champions	1st
2016	Champions	1st
2018	Champions	1st

=== FISU World University Games ===
==== Mixed team ====
Year	Round	Pos
2007	Group stage	16/21
2011	Did not enter	
2013	Did not enter	
2015	Did not enter	
2017	Did not enter	
2021	Did not enter	
2025	TBD	

=== World University Team Championships ===
==== Mixed team ====
Year	Round	Pos
2008	Did not enter	
2010	Did not enter	
2012	Did not enter	
2014	Did not enter	
2016	Did not enter	
2018	Did not enter	

**Red border color indicates tournament was held on home soil.

== Junior competitive record ==
=== Suhandinata Cup ===
Year	Round	Pos
2000	Did not enter	
2002	Group stage	15th
2004	Did not enter	
2006	Group stage	22nd
2007	Group stage	11th
2008	Did not enter	
2009	Did not enter	
2010	Did not enter	
2011	Did not enter	
2012	Group stage	27th
2013	Group stage	17th
2014	Group stage	22nd
2015	Did not enter	
2016	Group stage	33rd
2017	Group stage	34th
2018	Did not enter	
2019	Did not enter	
2022	Did not enter	
2023	Did not enter	
2024	Did not enter	
2025	Did not enter	
2026	Group stage	35th of 47

=== European Junior Team Championships ===
==== Mixed team ====
Year	Round	Pos
1975	Did not enter	
1977	Did not enter	
1979	Did not enter	
1981	Did not enter	
1983	Did not enter	
1985	Did not enter	
1987	Group stage	18th
1989	Did not enter	
1991	Group stage	20th
1993	Group stage	20th
1995	Group stage	9th
1997	Group stage	8th
1999	Group stage	12th
2001	Group stage	10th
2003	Group stage	9th
2005	Group stage	7th
2007	Group stage	12th
2009	Group stage	8/14
2011	Group stage	8/14
2013	Quarter-finals	5/8
2015	Did not enter	
2017	Group stage	19/24
2018	Group stage	9/16
2020	Did not enter	
2022	Group stage	9/16
2024	Group stage	9/16
2026	Quarter-finals	5/8

=== Finlandia Cup ===
==== Mixed team ====
Year	Round	Pos
1984	Did not enter	
1986	Did not enter	
1988	Did not enter	
1990	Group stage	12th
1992	Group stage	15th
1994	Champions	1st
1996	Did not enter	
1998	Did not enter	
2000	Did not enter	
2002	Did not enter	
2004	Did not enter	
2006	Did not enter	

=== Balkan Junior Team Championships ===
==== Mixed team ====
Year	Round	Pos
1992	Champions	1st
1993	Champions	1st
1994	Champions	1st
1995	Runners-up	2nd
1996	Champions	1st
1997	Champions	1st
1998	Champions	1st
1999	Champions	1st
2000	Runners-up	2nd
2001	Champions	1st
2002	Champions	1st
2004	Champions	1st
2005	Champions	1st
2006	Runners-up	2nd
2007	Champions	1st
2008	Runners-up	2nd
2010	Runners-up	2nd
2011	Champions	1st
2012	Champions	1st
2013	Champions	1st
2015	Runners-up	2nd
2016	Runners-up	2nd
2017	Runners-up	2nd
2019	Semi-finals	3rd

**Red border color indicates tournament was held on home soil.

== Players ==
=== Current squad ===
As of 2 January 2024

==== Men's team ====
Name	DoB/Age	Ranking of event		
Name	DoB/Age	MS	MD	XD
Daniel Nikolov	26 August 1998 (age 28)	-	709	-
Dimitar Yanakiev	5 November 1998 (age 28)	216	709	-
Ivan Rusev	6 May 1993 (age 33)	418	106	-
Iliyan Stoynov	25 January 2001 (age 25)	449	106	81
Patrik Dimitrov	19 March 2008 (age 18)	1735	1301	-
Tsvetan Ivanov	26 August 2007 (age 19)	1735	1301	1160
Teodor Mitev	9 September 2009 (age 17)	1623	1301	-
Stefan Zeirov	8 March 1999 (age 27)	-	1301	-

==== Women's team ====
Name	DoB/Age	Ranking of event		
Name	DoB/Age	WS	WD	XD
Kaloyana Nalbantova	6 March 2006 (age 20)	76	502	1019
Hristomira Popovska	5 September 2000 (age 26)	124	305	81
Mariya Mitsova	21 November 1996 (age 29)	-	763	-
Gergana Pavlova	27 July 2003 (age 23)	268	327	-
Gabriela Stoeva	15 July 1994 (age 32)	-	18	944
Stefani Stoeva	23 September 1995 (age 31)	948	18	-
Mihaela Chepisheva	27 November 2004 (age 21)	443	187	-
Tsvetina Popivanova	1 July 2005 (age 21)	695	187	312

=== Previous squads ===
==== Uber Cup ====
- 2016

==== European Team Championships ====
- Men's team: 2020
- Women's team: 2020
