= Sandra Rujević =

Serbian badminton player (born 1990)

Personal information
- Born: Sandra Halilović; 29 June 1990 (age 36) Novi Sad, Serbia
- Height: 1.70 m (5 ft 7 in)

Sport
- Country: Serbia
- Sport: Badminton
- Handedness: Right

Women's
- Highest ranking: 282 (WS) 7 Aug 2014; 157 (WD) 26 Jun 2014; 228 (XD) 10 Jul 2014
- BWF profile

Sandra Rujević (born 29 June 1990 as Sandra Halilović) is a Serbian badminton player. She was the women's doubles national championships from 2010 to 2013 and in the mixed doubles in 2010. In 2013, she won the international tournament in the women's doubles event partnered with Elme de Villiers of South Africa at the Botswana and South Africa. At the Balkan Championships, she won the bronze medal in the mixed team event.

== Achievements ==
=== BWF International Challenge/Series ===
Women's Doubles

Year	Tournament	Partner	Opponent	Score	Result
2013	South Africa International	(South Africa) Elme de Villiers	(South Africa) Michelle Butler-Emmett (South Africa) Sandra Le Grange	21–14, 21–13	(gold) Winner
2013	Botswana International	(South Africa) Elme de Villiers	(Nigeria) Grace Gabriel (Mauritius) Yeldie Louison	21–13, 21–16	(gold) Winner

BWF International Challenge tournament
BWF International Series tournament
BWF Future Series tournament
