= Ivan Rusev (badminton) =

Personal information
- Born: Ivan Rusev Atanasov; 6 May 1993 (age 33)

Sport
- Country: Bulgaria
- Sport: Badminton

Men's singles & doubles
- Highest ranking: 114 (MS 5 April 2018); 91 (MD 5 October 2017); 259 (XD 17 May 2012)
- BWF profile

Ivan Rusev Atanasov (Bulgarian: Иван Русев Атанасов; born 6 May 1993) is a Bulgarian badminton player.

== Achievements ==
=== BWF International Challenge/Series (6 titles, 9 runners-up) ===
Men's singles
Year	Tournament	Opponent	Score	Result
2016	Hellas International	(Denmark) Kim Bruun	6–21, 21–16, 21–19	(gold) Winner
2016	Slovak Open	(Scotland) Matthew Carder	6–11, 7–11, 6–11	(silver) Runner-up
2017	Hellas International	(Denmark) Kim Bruun	9–21, 18–21	(silver) Runner-up
2019	Slovak Open	(Denmark) Kim Bruun	18–21, 11–21	(silver) Runner-up
2019	Polish International	(Denmark) Mads Christophersen	6–21, 14–21	(silver) Runner-up

Men's doubles
Year	Tournament	Partner	Opponent	Score	Result
2015	Bulgarian International	(Bulgaria) Daniel Nikolov	(France) Jordan Corvee (France) Julien Maio	21–18, 23–25, 17–21	(silver) Runner-up
2016	Hellas International	(Bulgaria) Daniel Nikolov	(Bulgaria) Peyo Boichinov (Bulgaria) Philip Shishov	21–19, 21–16	(gold) Winner
2016	Bulgarian International	(Bulgaria) Daniel Nikolov	(Turkey) Muhammed Ali Kurt (Turkey) Mert Tunco	21–13, 21–18	(gold) Winner
2017	Hellas International	(Bulgaria) Daniel Nikolov	(Germany) Daniel Benz (Germany) Andreas Heinz	21–15, 11–21, 23–21	(gold) Winner
2017	Romanian International	(Bulgaria) Daniel Nikolov	(Slovenia) Andraz Krapez (Thailand) Samatcha Tovannakasem	15–21, 15–21	(silver) Runner-up
2018	Hellas International	(Bulgaria) Daniel Nikolov	(England) David Jones (England) Johnnie Torjussen	21–16, 21–19	(gold) Winner
2018	Bulgarian International	(Bulgaria) Alex Vlaar	(Czech Republic) Jaromír Janáček (Czech Republic) Tomáš Švejda	19–21, 14–21	(silver) Runner-up
2019	Slovak Open	(Bulgaria) Daniel Nikolov	(Thailand) Supak Jomkoh (Thailand) Wachirawit Sothon	13–21, 14–21	(silver) Runner-up
2020	Bulgarian International	(Bulgaria) Daniel Nikolov	(Slovenia) Miha Ivanič (Slovenia) Gasper Krivec	21–9, 21–14	(gold) Winner
2024	Estonian International	(Bulgaria) Iliyan Stoynov	(Singapore) Loh Kean Hean (Singapore) Nicholas Low	18–21, 8–21	(silver) Runner-up

BWF International Challenge tournament
BWF International Series tournament
BWF Future Series tournament
