= Dimitria Popstoikova =

Bulgarian badminton player (born 1982)

Personal information
- Born: 1 June 1982 (age 44)

Sport
- Country: Bulgaria
- Sport: Badminton

Women's singles & doubles
- Highest ranking: 117 (WS 4 April 2013); 30 (WD 21 January 2010); 194 (XD 17 January 2013)
- BWF profile
Medal record
Women's badminton
Representing Bulgaria
European Women's Team Championships
Silver medal – second place	2016 Kazan	Women's team
Bronze medal – third place	2014 Basel	Women's team

Dimitria Popstoikova (Bulgarian: Димитрия Попстойкова; born 1 June 1982) is a Bulgarian badminton player.

== Achievements ==
=== BWF Grand Prix ===
The BWF Grand Prix had two levels, the Grand Prix and Grand Prix Gold. It was a series of badminton tournaments sanctioned by the Badminton World Federation (BWF) and played between 2007 and 2017.

Women's doubles
Year	Tournament	Partner	Opponent	Score	Result
2008	Russian Open	(Bulgaria) Petya Nedelcheva	(Russia) Valeria Sorokina (Russia) Nina Vislova	18–21, 8–21	(silver) Runner-up

BWF Grand Prix Gold tournament
BWF Grand Prix tournament

=== BWF International Challenge/Series ===
Women's singles
Year	Tournament	Opponent	Score	Result
2008	Hella International	(Chinese Taipei) Hung Shih-han	16–21, 14–21	(silver) Runner-up

Women's doubles
Year	Tournament	Partner	Opponent	Score	Result
2008	Hungarian International	(Bulgaria) Petya Nedelcheva	(Russia) Anastasia Prokopenko (Russia) Olga Golovanova	12–21, 21–10, 12–21	(silver) Runner-up
2009	Banuinvest International	(Bulgaria) Petya Nedelcheva	(Romania) Alexandra Milon (Romania) Florentina Petre	21–17, 21–14	(gold) Winner
2012	Bulgarian Hebar Open	(Bulgaria) Rumiana Ivanova	(Bulgaria) Gabriela Stoeva (Bulgaria) Stefani Stoeva	21–15, 14–21, 11–21	(silver) Runner-up
2013	Bulgarian Eurasia Open	(Bulgaria) Petya Nedelcheva	(Bulgaria) Gabriela Stoeva (Bulgaria) Stefani Stoeva	21–11, 21–8	(gold) Winner
2014	Bulgarian Eurasia Open	(Bulgaria) Petya Nedelcheva	(Turkey) Özge Bayrak (Turkey) Neslihan Yiğit	5–11, 5–11, 11–8, 11–10, 7–11	(silver) Runner-up

Mixed doubles
Year	Tournament	Partner	Opponent	Score	Result
2012	Bulgarian Hebar Open	(Bulgaria) Blagovest Kisyov	(Austria) Roman Zirnwald (Austria) Elisabeth Baldauf	14–21, 21–11, 19–21	(silver) Runner-up
2014	Hellas International	(Bulgaria) Blagovest Kisyov	(Republic of Ireland) Sam Magee (Republic of Ireland) Chloe Magee	14–21, 10–21	(silver) Runner-up

BWF International Challenge tournament
BWF International Series tournament
BWF Future Series tournament
