= 2003 IBF World Championships – Men's doubles =

Men's doubles at the 2003 IBF World Championships
- Venue: National Indoor Arena
- Location: Birmingham, United Kingdom
- Dates: July 28, 2003 – August 3, 2003

Medalists
gold medal	Lars Paaske; Jonas Rasmussen	Denmark
silver medal	Candra Wijaya; Sigit Budiarto	Indonesia
bronze medal	Sang Yang; Zheng Bo	China
bronze medal	Fu Haifeng; Cai Yun	China

The 2003 IBF World Championships (World Badminton Championships) took place in the National Indoor Arena in Birmingham, England, between July 28 and August 3, 2003. Following the results in the men's doubles.

== Main stage ==
=== Section 1 ===
First round
(Denmark) Lars Paaske (Denmark) Jonas Rasmussen
bye
(England) Simon Archer (England) Graham Hurrell	15	15
(Greece) George Patis (Greece) Theodoros Velkos	5	3
(Denmark) Jim Laugesen (Denmark) Michael Sogaard	15	15
(Singapore) Hendry Kurniawan Saputra (Singapore) Denny Setiawan	10	6
(Slovenia) Miha Horvat (Slovenia) Denis Peshechonov
(Sweden) Henrik Andersson (Sweden) Fredrik Bergström
(Thailand) Tesana Panvisvas (Thailand) Pramote Teerawiwatana
bye
(Canada) Keith Chan (Canada) William Milroy	15	15
(Kazakhstan) Igor Dmitriev (Kazakhstan) Anuar Musafirov	5	2
(Russia) Stanislav Pukhov (Russia) Nikolaj Zuev	15	15
(Germany) Kristof Hopp (Germany) Thomas Tesche	9	11
(United States) Mathew Fogarty (United States) Dean Schoppe	11	15	15
(Wales) Liam Ingram (Wales) Richard Williams	15	11	10

Second round
(Denmark) Lars Paaske (Denmark) Jonas Rasmussen	15	15
(England) Simon Archer (England) Graham Hurrell	12	2
(Denmark) Jim Laugesen (Denmark) Michael Sogaard	15	15
(Slovenia) Miha Horvat (Slovenia) Denis Peshechonov	2	3
(Thailand) Tesana Panvisvas (Thailand) Pramote Teerawiwatana	15	15
(Canada) Keith Chan (Canada) William Milroy	7	4
(Russia) Stanislav Pukhov (Russia) Nikolaj Zuev	15	15
(United States) Mathew Fogarty (United States) Dean Schoppe	5	10

Third round
(Denmark) Lars Paaske (Denmark) Jonas Rasmussen	15	7	15
(Denmark) Jim Laugesen (Denmark) Michael Sogaard	7	15	6
(Thailand) Tesana Panvisvas (Thailand) Pramote Teerawiwatana	15	17
(Russia) Stanislav Pukhov (Russia) Nikolaj Zuev	7	14

Quarterfinals
(Denmark) Lars Paaske (Denmark) Jonas Rasmussen	15	15
(Thailand) Tesana Panvisvas (Thailand) Pramote Teerawiwatana	2	12

=== Section 2 ===
First round
(China) Sang Yang (China) Zheng Bo	15	15
(Belgium) Francois Delvaux (Belgium) David Jaco	1	2
(Japan) Keita Masuda (Japan) Tadashi Ohtsuka	15	15
(India) Jaseel P. Ismail (India) Jaison Xavier	7	5
(Denmark) Mathias Boe (Denmark) Michael Lamp
bye
(Hong Kong) Yohan Hadikusumo Wiratama (Hong Kong) Yau Tsz Yuk	15	15
(Russia) Alexandr Nikolaenko (Russia) Nikolaj Nikolaenko	8	11
(Malaysia) Chan Chong Ming (Malaysia) Chew Choon Eng	13	15	15
(England) Anthony Clark (England) Nathan Robertson	15	7	2
(France) Manuel Dubrulle (France) Mihail Popov	15	15
(Belarus) Andrei Konakh (Belarus) Andrei Malioutin	8	8
(Indonesia) Alven Yulianto (Indonesia) Luluk Hadiyanto	15	15
(Brazil) Guilherme Kumasaka (Brazil) Guilherme Pardo	6	4
(South Korea) Ha Tae-kwon (South Korea) Kim Dong-moon
bye

Second round
(China) Sang Yang (China) Zheng Bo	17	15	15
(Japan) Keita Masuda (Japan) Tadashi Ohtsuka	15	12	10
(Denmark) Mathias Boe (Denmark) Michael Lamp	15	15
(Hong Kong) Yohan Hadikusumo Wiratama (Hong Kong) Yau Tsz Yuk	8	8
(Malaysia) Chan Chong Ming (Malaysia) Chew Choon Eng	15	15
(France) Manuel Dubrulle (France) Mihail Popov	4	4
(Indonesia) Alven Yulianto (Indonesia) Luluk Hadiyanto	15
(South Korea) Ha Tae-kwon (South Korea) Kim Dong-moon	7

Third round
(China) Sang Yang (China) Zheng Bo	15	14	15
(Denmark) Mathias Boe (Denmark) Michael Lamp	13	17	10
(Malaysia) Chan Chong Ming (Malaysia) Chew Choon Eng	15	12	15
(Indonesia) Alven Yulianto (Indonesia) Luluk Hadiyanto	9	15	8

Quarterfinals
(China) Sang Yang (China) Zheng Bo	7	15	15
(Malaysia) Chan Chong Ming (Malaysia) Chew Choon Eng	15	3	11

=== Section 3 ===
First round
(Indonesia) Candra Wijaya (Indonesia) Sigit Budiarto	15	15
(Malaysia) Choong Tan Fook (Malaysia) Lee Wan Wah	7	10
(United States) Howard Bach (United States) Kevin Han	15	15
(Germany) Jochen Cassel (Germany) Joachim Tesche	13	14
(Hong Kong) Liu Kwok Wa (Hong Kong) Albertus Susanto Njoto	15	15
(Singapore) Chua Yong Joo (Singapore) Khoo Kian Teck	7	3
(South Korea) Lee Dong-soo (South Korea) Yoo Yong-sung
bye
(China) Chen Rui (China) Wang Wei	15	15
(Wales) Matthew Hughes (Wales) Martyn Lewis	5	5
(Poland) Michal Logosz (Poland) Robert Mateusiak	15	15
(England) Robert Blair (England) Ian Palethorpe	10	13
(South Korea) Kim Yong-hyun (South Korea) Yim Bang-eun
bye
(Chinese Taipei) Tsai Chia-Hsin (Chinese Taipei) Tseng Chung-Lin	16	15	15
(Canada) Mike Beres (Canada) Kyle Hunter	17	10	3

Second round
(Indonesia) Candra Wijaya (Indonesia) Sigit Budiarto	15	15
(United States) Howard Bach (United States) Kevin Han	11	6
(Hong Kong) Liu Kwok Wa (Hong Kong) Albertus Susanto Njoto
(South Korea) Lee Dong-soo (South Korea) Yoo Yong-sung
(China) Chen Rui (China) Wang Wei	15	15
(Poland) Michal Logosz (Poland) Robert Mateusiak	7	7
(South Korea) Kim Yong-hyun (South Korea) Yim Bang-eun	15	15
(Chinese Taipei) Tsai Chia-Hsin (Chinese Taipei) Tseng Chung-Lin	8	5

Third round
(Indonesia) Candra Wijaya (Indonesia) Sigit Budiarto	15	15
(Hong Kong) Liu Kwok Wa (Hong Kong) Albertus Susanto Njoto	13	6
(China) Chen Rui (China) Wang Wei	15	15
(South Korea) Kim Yong-hyun (South Korea) Yim Bang-eun	11	13

Quarterfinals
(Indonesia) Candra Wijaya (Indonesia) Sigit Budiarto	15	15
(China) Chen Rui (China) Wang Wei	3	3

=== Section 4 ===
First round
(China) Fu Haifeng (China) Cai Yun	15	15
(Germany) Ingo Kindervater (Germany) Björn Siegemund	6	9
(Thailand) Patapol Ngernsrisuk (Thailand) Sudket Prapakamol	15	15
(India) V. Diju (India) Thomas Sanave	13	12
(Japan) Shuichi Nakao (Japan) Shuichi Sakamoto	15	15
(Greece) Pavlos Charalambidis (Greece) Christos Tsartsidis	2	2
(Bulgaria) Konstantin Dobrev (Bulgaria) Georgi Petrov	15	15
(United States) Mike Chansawangpuvana (United States) Eric Go	1	3
(Denmark) Jens Eriksen (Denmark) Martin Lundgaard Hansen
bye
(France) Vincent Laigle (France) Svetoslav Stoyanov	15	15
(Belgium) Wouter Claes (Belgium) Frederic Mawet	10	6
(Spain) José Antonio Crespo (Spain) Sergio Llopis	15	15
(Russia) Evgenij Isakov (Russia) Andrej Zholobov	12	8
(Slovenia) Ales Murn (Slovenia) Andrej Pohar
(Sweden) Imanuel Hirschfeldt (Sweden) Jörgen Olsson

Second round
(China) Fu Haifeng (China) Cai Yun	15	15
(Thailand) Patapol Ngernsrisuk (Thailand) Sudket Prapakamol	12	5
(Japan) Shuichi Nakao (Japan) Shuichi Sakamoto	15	15
(Bulgaria) Konstantin Dobrev (Bulgaria) Georgi Petrov	4	2
(Denmark) Jens Eriksen (Denmark) Martin Lundgaard Hansen	15	15
(France) Vincent Laigle (France) Svetoslav Stoyanov	6	5
(Spain) José Antonio Crespo (Spain) Sergio Llopis
(Slovenia) Ales Murn (Slovenia) Andrej Pohar

Third round
(China) Fu Haifeng (China) Cai Yun	15	15
(Japan) Shuichi Nakao (Japan) Shuichi Sakamoto	8	5
(Denmark) Jens Eriksen (Denmark) Martin Lundgaard Hansen	11	15	15
(Spain) José Antonio Crespo (Spain) Sergio Llopis	15	9	11

Quarterfinals
(China) Fu Haifeng (China) Cai Yun	15	15
(Denmark) Jens Eriksen (Denmark) Martin Lundgaard Hansen	13	8

== Final stage ==
Quarterfinals
4	(Denmark) Lars Paaske (Denmark) Jonas Rasmussen	15	15
(Thailand) Tesana Panvisvas (Thailand) Pramote Teerawiwatana	2	12
(China) Sang Yang (China) Zheng Bo	7	15	15
(Malaysia) Chan Chong Ming (Malaysia) Chew Choon Eng	15	3	11
11	(Indonesia) Candra Wijaya (Indonesia) Sigit Budiarto	15	15
(China) Chen Rui (China) Wang Wei	3	3
7	(China) Fu Haifeng (China) Cai Yun	15	15
(Denmark) Jens Eriksen (Denmark) Martin Lundgaard Hansen	13	8

Semifinals
4	(Denmark) Lars Paaske (Denmark) Jonas Rasmussen	15	15
(China) Sang Yang (China) Zheng Bo	6	8
11	(Indonesia) Candra Wijaya (Indonesia) Sigit Budiarto	6	15	15
7	(China) Fu Haifeng (China) Cai Yun	15	10	9

Finals
4	(Denmark) Lars Paaske (Denmark) Jonas Rasmussen	15	13	15
11	(Indonesia) Candra Wijaya (Indonesia) Sigit Budiarto	7	15	13
