= 2007–08 European Badminton Circuit season =

The 2007-08 European Badminton Circuit season started in July 2007 and ended in April 2008.

== Results ==
=== Winners ===
Circuit	Men's singles	Women's singles	Men's doubles	Women's doubles	Mixed doubles
St. Petersburg White Nights	(Russia) Stanislav Pukhov	(Japan) Kanako Yonekura	(Russia) Vitaly Durkin (Russia) Aleksandr Nikolaenko	(Russia) Anastasia Russkikh (Russia) Ekaterina Ananina	(Russia) Aleksandr Nikolaenko (Russia) Nina Vislova
Turkey International	(Denmark) Hans-Kristian Vittinghus	(Germany) Juliane Schenk	(Germany) Kristof Hopp (Germany) Ingo Kindervater	(Germany) Nicole Grether (Germany) Juliane Schenk	(Germany) Ingo Kindervater (Germany) Kathrin Piotrowski
Belgian International	(Germany) Marc Zwiebler	(Ukraine) Larissa Griga	(Germany) Kristof Hopp (Germany) Ingo Kindervater	(England) Natalie Munt (England) Joanne Nicholas	(England) Chris Langridge (England) Joanne Nicholas
Czech International	(India) Arvind Bhat	(Netherlands) Rachel van Cutsen	(Denmark) Kasper Henriksen (Denmark) Rasmus Bonde	(Denmark) Mie Schjøtt-Kristensen (Denmark) Christinna Pedersen	(Denmark) Rasmus Bonde (Denmark) Christinna Pedersen
Slovak International	(Ukraine) Dmytro Zavadskyy	(Denmark) Anne Hald Jensen	(Croatia) Zvonimir Đurkinjak (Croatia) Jakub Bitman	(Russia) Elena Shimko (Russia) Tatjana Bibik	(Russia) Anton Nazarenko (Russia) Elena Chernyavskya
Bulgarian International	(Czech Republic) Jan Fröhlich	(Bulgaria) Petya Nedelcheva	(Poland) Robert Mateusiak (Poland) Michał Łogosz	(Russia) Nina Vislova (Russia) Valeria Sorokina	(Russia) Alexander Nikolaenko (Russia) Nina Vislova
Cyprus International	(India) Chetan Anand	(Estonia) Kati Tolmoff	(Denmark) Christian Larsen (Denmark) Christian John Skovgaard	(India) Jwala Gutta (India) Shruti Kurian	(India) Chetan Anand (India) Jwala Gutta
Hungarian International	(Denmark) Jan Ø. Jørgensen	(Iceland) Ragna Ingólfsdóttir	(Denmark) Mads Pieler Kolding (Denmark) Peter Mørk	(Denmark) Line Damkjær Kruse (Denmark) Camilla Sørensen	(China) Zhang Yi (China) Cai Jiani
Iceland International	(Czech Republic) Petr Koukal	(Iceland) Ragna Ingólfsdóttir	(Denmark) Peter Hasbak (Denmark) Jonas Glyager Jensen	(Iceland) Katrín Atladóttir (Iceland) Ragna Ingólfsdóttir	(Denmark) Jonas Glyager Jensen (Denmark) Maria Kaaberböl Thorberg
Norwegian International	(Germany) Marc Zwiebler	(Germany) Juliane Schenk	(United States) Howard Bach (United States) Khan Malaythong	(Russia) Anastasia Russkikh (Russia) Ekaterina Ananina	(Germany) Kristof Hopp (Germany) Birgit Overzier
Scottish Open	(Japan) Kenichi Tago	(Japan) Kanako Yonekura	(England) Robert Blair (England) David Lindley	(Russia) Nina Vislova (Russia) Valeria Sorokina	(England) Robert Blair (Scotland) Imogen Bankier
Welsh International	(Germany) Marc Zwiebler	(England) Jill Pittard	(Poland) Wojciech Szkudlarczyk (Poland) Adam Cwalina	(Republic of Ireland) Chloe Magee (Republic of Ireland) Bing Huang	(Poland) Wojciech Szkudlarczyk (Poland) Małgorzata Kurdelska
Irish Open	(Denmark) Peter Mikkelsen	(England) Elizabeth Cann	(United States) Khan Malaythong (United States) Howard Bach	(Republic of Ireland) Huang Bing (Republic of Ireland) Chloe Magee	(United States) Howard Bach (United States) Eva Lee
Italian International	(Japan) Sho Sasaki	(Germany) Juliane Schenk	(Denmark) Carsten Mogensen (Denmark) Mathias Boe	(Russia) Anastasia Russkikh (Russia) Ekaterina Ananina	(Russia) Alexander Nikolaenko (Russia) Nina Vislova
Greece International	(Germany) Marc Zwiebler	(Bulgaria) Petya Nedelcheva	(Malaysia) Goh Ying Jin (Malaysia) Au Kok Leong	(Bulgaria) Diana Dimova (Bulgaria) Petya Nedelcheva	(Denmark) Mads Pieler Kolding (Denmark) Line Damkjær Kruse
Swedish International	(Germany) Marc Zwiebler	(China) Li Wenyan	(Denmark) Rasmus Mangor Andersen (Denmark) Peter Steffensen	(China) Yu Qi (China) Cai Jiani	(Denmark) Peter Steffensen (Denmark) Julie Houmann
Austrian International	(India) Anand Pawar	(China) Zhang Xi	(Indonesia) Fran Kurniawan (Indonesia) Rendra Wijaya	(China) Cai Jiani (China) Yu Qi	(China) Zhang Yi (China) Cai Jiani
Croatian International	(Finland) Ville Lång	(Japan) Kaori Imabeppu	(India) Rupesh Kumar (India) Sanave Thomas	(Denmark) Maria Thorberg (Estonia) Kati Tolmoff	(France) Baptiste Carême (France) Laura Choinet
Portugal International	(India) Anand Pawar	(Japan) Kaori Imabeppu	(Netherlands) Ruud Bosch (Netherlands) Koen Ridder	(China) Cai Jiani (China) Zhang Xi	(China) Zhang Yi (China) Cai Jiani
Romanian International	(Finland) Ville Lång	(South Korea) Hwang Hye-youn	(Bulgaria) Vladimir Metodiev (Bulgaria) Krasimir Yankov	(Russia) Olga Golovanova (Russia) Anastasia Prokopenko	(Bulgaria) Stilian Makarski (Bulgaria) Diana Dimova
Polish Open	(Germany) Marc Zwiebler	(Germany) Juliane Schenk	(Poland) Michał Łogosz (Poland) Robert Mateusiak	(Indonesia) Shendy Puspa Irawati (Indonesia) Meiliana Jauhari	(Poland) Robert Mateusiak (Poland) Nadieżda Kostiuczyk
Finnish International	(Denmark) Martin Bille Larsen	(England) Elizabeth Cann	(Indonesia) Fran Kurniawan (Indonesia) Rendra Wijaya	(Denmark) Lena Frier Kristiansen (Denmark) Kamilla Rytter Juhl	(Indonesia) Fran Kurniawan (Indonesia) Shendy Puspa Irawati
Dutch International	(Denmark) Hans-Kristian Vittinghus	(Ukraine) Larisa Griga	(Germany) Kristof Hopp (Germany) Ingo Kindervater	(Poland) Kamila Augustyn (Poland) Nadieżda Kostiuczyk	(Denmark) Rasmus Bonde (Denmark) Helle Nielsen

=== Performance by countries ===
Tabulated below are the Circuit performances based on countries. Only countries who have won a title are listed:

No.	Team	RUS	TUR	BEL	CZE	SVK	BUL	CYP	HUN	ISL	NOR	SCO	WLS	IRL	ITA	GRE	SWE	AUT	CRO	POR	ROM	POL	FIN	NLD	Total
1	Denmark		1		3	1			3	2				1	1	1	2		1				2	2	20
2	Germany		4	2				1			3		1		1	1	1					2		1	17
3	Russia	4				2	2				1	1			2						1				13
4	China								1								2	3		2					8
5	India				1			3										1	1	1					7
5	England			2								2	1	1									1		7
7	Japan	1										2			1				1	1					6
7	Poland						1						2									2		1	6
9	Bulgaria						1									2					2				5
10	Indonesia																	1				1	2		4
11	Iceland								1	2															3
11	United States										1			2											3
11	Ukraine			1		1																		1	3
14	Czech Republic						1			1															2
14	Estonia							1											1						2
14	Finland																		1		1				2
14	Ireland												1	1											2
14	Scotland											1								1					2
19	Croatia					1																			1
19	France																		1						1
19	Malaysia															1									1
19	Netherlands				1																				1
19	South Korea																				1				1
