= 2005 Balkan Badminton Championships =

Tournament details
- Dates: 16–19 June
- Venue: Omonoia Sports Center
- Location: Serres, Greece

The 2005 Balkan Badminton Championships (Greek: Βαλκανικού Πρωταθλήματος Αντιπτέρισης 2005) was a badminton tournament sanctioned by the Balkan Badminton Association and Badminton Europe. The individual and mixed team events were held from 16 to 19 June 2005.

The tournament was held at the Omonoia Sports Center in Serres, Greece. Seven countries took part in the championships. In the team event, Bulgaria defeated Romania 3–0 in the final while Greece defeated Moldova 3–1 in the third place playoffs.

Bulgaria made a clean sweep in the individual events, winning gold in all five disciplines.

== Medal summary ==
=== Medalists ===
Event	Gold	Silver	Bronze
Men's singles	(Bulgaria) Konstantin Dobrev	(Bulgaria) Georgi Petrov	(Greece) Theodoros Velkos
Men's singles	(Bulgaria) Konstantin Dobrev	(Bulgaria) Georgi Petrov	(Romania) Florin Posteucă
Women's singles	(Bulgaria) Petya Nedelcheva	(Bulgaria) Diana Dimova	(Bulgaria) Maya Ivanova
Women's singles	(Bulgaria) Petya Nedelcheva	(Bulgaria) Diana Dimova	(Romania) Adina Posteucă
Men's doubles	(Bulgaria) Konstantin Dobrev (Bulgaria) Georgi Petrov	(Bulgaria) Stiliyan Makarski (Bulgaria) Vladimir Metodiev	(Romania) Robert Ciobotaru (Romania) George Constantinescu
Men's doubles	(Bulgaria) Konstantin Dobrev (Bulgaria) Georgi Petrov	(Bulgaria) Stiliyan Makarski (Bulgaria) Vladimir Metodiev	(Bulgaria) Krasimir Jankov (Greece) Theodoros Velkos
Women's doubles	(Bulgaria) Dimitriyka Dimitrova (Bulgaria) Diana Dimova	(Bulgaria) Maya Ivanova (Bulgaria) Petya Nedelcheva	(Greece) Chrisa Georgali (Greece) Christina Mavromatidou
Women's doubles	(Bulgaria) Dimitriyka Dimitrova (Bulgaria) Diana Dimova	(Bulgaria) Maya Ivanova (Bulgaria) Petya Nedelcheva	(Moldova) Natalia Coseli (Moldova) Nadejda Litvinenco
Mixed doubles	(Bulgaria) Konstantin Dobrev (Bulgaria) Maya Ivanova	(Romania) Robert Ciobotaru (Romania) Florentina Petre	(Bulgaria) Stiliyan Makarski (Bulgaria) Diana Dimova
Mixed doubles	(Bulgaria) Konstantin Dobrev (Bulgaria) Maya Ivanova	(Romania) Robert Ciobotaru (Romania) Florentina Petre	(Moldova) Maxim Carpenco (Moldova) Nadejda Litvinenco
Mixed team	Bulgaria	Romania	Greece

=== Medal table ===
* Host nation (Greece)

Rank	Nation	Gold	Silver	Bronze	Total
1	Bulgaria	6	4	2.5	12.5
2	Romania	0	2	3	5
3	Greece*	0	0	3.5	3.5
4	Moldova	0	0	2	2
Totals (4 entries)		6	6	11	23

== Men's singles ==
=== Finals ===
Semi-finals
(Bulgaria) Georgi Petrov	15	15
(Greece) Theodoros Velkos	8	8
(Bulgaria) Konstantin Dobrev	15	17
(Romania) Florin Posteucă	6	15

Final
(Bulgaria) Georgi Petrov	8	7
(Bulgaria) Konstantin Dobrev	15	15

=== Top half ===
==== Section 1 ====
First round
(North Macedonia) J Markovski	0	1
(Romania) F Patroaica	15	15
(Greece) N Giagtzis	17	9	15
(Serbia and Montenegro) M Stanković	14	15	6

Second round
(Bulgaria) G Petrov	15	15
(Romania) F Patroaica	4	2
(Bulgaria) K Jankov	15	15
(Greece) N Giagtzis	8	5

Quarter-finals
(Bulgaria) G Petrov	12	15	15
(Bulgaria) K Jankov	15	5	7

==== Section 2 ====
First round
(Greece) A Neofitos	7	0
(Turkey) K Akcebe	15	15
(Serbia and Montenegro) R Jovović	15	15
(North Macedonia) S Vuksanović	6	1
(Turkey) H Erdinç	12	7
(Greece) T Velkos	15	15

Second round
(Romania) G Constantinescu	15	15
(Turkey) K Akcebe	5	4
(Serbia and Montenegro) R Jovović	9	3
(Greece) T Velkos	15	15

Quarter-finals
(Romania) G Constantinescu	13	15	9
(Greece) T Velkos	15	11	15

=== Bottom half ===
==== Section 3 ====
First round
(Serbia and Montenegro) N Marjanović	15	15
(North Macedonia) G Tasevski	1	3
(Turkey) H H Durakcan	w	/	o
(Greece) C Tsartsidis
(Bulgaria) K Dobrev	15	15
(Greece) D Giagtzis	2	1

Second round
(Serbia and Montenegro) N Marjanović	1	5
(Turkey) H H Durakcan	15	15
(Romania) R Ciobotaru	6	5
(Bulgaria) K Dobrev	15	15

Quarter-finals
(Turkey) H H Durakcan	4	1
(Bulgaria) K Dobrev	15	15

==== Section 4 ====
First round
(Greece) P Skarlatos	15	15
(North Macedonia) G Zotovski	2	1
(Turkey) A Kose	15	15
(Serbia and Montenegro) M Barbir	6	7
(Greece) A Ioannidis	0	5
(Romania) F Posteucă	15	15

Second round
(Greece) P Skarlatos	17	15
(Turkey) A Kose	14	0
(Bulgaria) S Makarski	6	8
(Romania) F Posteucă	15	15

Quarter-finals
(Greece) P Skarlatos	5	2
(Romania) F Posteucă	15	15

== Women's singles ==
=== Finals ===
Semi-finals
(Bulgaria) Petya Nedelcheva	11	11
(Romania) Adina Posteucă	2	3
(Bulgaria) Diana Dimova	11	11
(Bulgaria) Maya Ivanova	9	3

Final
(Bulgaria) Petya Nedelcheva	11	11
(Bulgaria) Diana Dimova	2	8

=== Top half ===
==== Section 1 ====
First round
(Serbia and Montenegro) M Bulatović	3	2
(Turkey) Ö Çalışkan	11	11

Second round
(Bulgaria) P Nedelcheva	11	11
(Greece) I Boutakidou	1	1
(Greece) N Pliaka	3	3
(Turkey) Ö Çalışkan	11	11

Quarter-finals
(Bulgaria) P Nedelcheva	11	11
(Turkey) Ö Çalışkan	2	3

==== Section 2 ====
First round
(Bulgaria) D Dimitrova	11	11
(Greece) C Diamantopoulou	1	2
(Greece) A Karagiaouridou	3	2
(Romania) A Posteucă	11	11

Second round
(Romania) I Popescu	1	4
(Bulgaria) D Dimitrova	11	11
(North Macedonia) I Jovanovska	0	0
(Romania) A Posteucă	11	11

Quarter-finals
(Bulgaria) D Dimitrova	8	4
(Romania) A Posteucă	11	11

=== Bottom half ===
==== Section 3 ====
First round
(Bulgaria) D Dimova	11	11
(Serbia and Montenegro) A Gligorić	0	0
(Turkey) R Kemer	3	3
(Romania) C Blanaru	11	11

Second round
(Bulgaria) D Dimova	11	11
(Turkey) N Ekin	2	0
(Romania) C Blanaru	5	8
(Greece) C Mavromatidou	11	11

Quarter-finals
(Bulgaria) D Dimova	11	11
(Greece) C Mavromatidou	3	4

==== Section 4 ====
First round
(Bulgaria) M Ivanova	11	11
(Serbia and Montenegro) A Mihajl	1	0

Second round
(Bulgaria) M Ivanova	11	11
(Greece) E Politova	2	1
(Greece) P Toga	2	4
(Romania) F Petre	11	11

Quarter-finals
(Bulgaria) M Ivanova	0	11	11
(Romania) F Petre	11	9	1

== Men's doubles ==
=== Bracket ===
First round
(Moldova) Maxim Carpenco (Moldova) Igor Ursatii	15	15
(Turkey) Hasan Hüseyin Durakcan (Turkey) Hasan Erdinç	13	8
(Bulgaria) Konstantin Dobrev (Bulgaria) Georgi Petrov	15	15
(Serbia and Montenegro) Nikola Marjanović (Serbia and Montenegro) Žarko Petrović	1	5
(Romania) Florin Patroaica (Romania) Florin Posteucă	15	15
(North Macedonia) Jovica Markovski (North Macedonia) Goran Tasevski	0	0
(Turkey) Kamil Akcebe (Turkey) Aydan Kose	10	15	15
(Serbia and Montenegro) Milan Barbir (Serbia and Montenegro) Radomir Jovović	15	10	3
(Greece) Dimitrios Giagtzis (Greece) Anastasios Ioannidis	2	6
(Bulgaria) Stiliyan Makarski (Bulgaria) Vladimir Metodiev	15	15
(Greece) Argiris Neofitos (Serbia and Montenegro) Mladen Stanković	15	15
(North Macedonia) Saša Vuksanović (North Macedonia) Gordan Zotovski	2	3
(Greece) Nektarios Giagtzis (Greece) Panagiotis Skarlatos	0	8
(Romania) Robert Ciobotaru (Romania) George Constantinescu	15	15

Quarter-finals
(Bulgaria) Krasimir Jankov (Greece) Theodoros Velkos	10	15	15
(Moldova) Maxim Carpenco (Moldova) Igor Ursatii	15	8	9
(Bulgaria) Konstantin Dobrev (Bulgaria) Georgi Petrov	15	15
(Romania) Florin Patroaica (Romania) Florin Posteucă	8	7
(Turkey) Kamil Akcebe (Turkey) Aydan Kose	8	7
(Bulgaria) Stiliyan Makarski (Bulgaria) Vladimir Metodiev	15	15
(Greece) Argiris Neofitos (Serbia and Montenegro) Mladen Stanković	0	8
(Romania) Robert Ciobotaru (Romania) George Constantinescu	15	15

Semi-finals
(Bulgaria) Krasimir Jankov (Greece) Theodoros Velkos	15	9	5
(Bulgaria) Konstantin Dobrev (Bulgaria) Georgi Petrov	10	15	15
(Bulgaria) Stiliyan Makarski (Bulgaria) Vladimir Metodiev	15	15
(Romania) Robert Ciobotaru (Romania) George Constantinescu	11	6

Final
(Bulgaria) Konstantin Dobrev (Bulgaria) Georgi Petrov	15	15
(Bulgaria) Stiliyan Makarski (Bulgaria) Vladimir Metodiev	7	8

== Women's doubles ==
First round
(Serbia and Montenegro) Aleksandra Gligorić (Serbia and Montenegro) A. Mihajl	7	3
(Greece) I. Boutakidou (Greece) E. Politova	15	15
(Bulgaria) Dimitriyka Dimitrova (Bulgaria) Diana Dimova	15	15
(Greece) Christina Diamantopoulou (Turkey) Nurdan Ekin	2	6
(Serbia and Montenegro) Marija Bulatović (Serbia and Montenegro) Marija Glogovac	4	2
(Turkey) Öznur Çalışkan (Turkey) Rabia Kemer	15	15
(North Macedonia) Ivana Jovanovska (Greece) Nikoleta Pliaka	1	1
(Moldova) Natalia Coseli (Moldova) Nadejda Litvinenco	15	15
(Romania) Irina Popescu (Romania) Adina Posteucă	15	15
(Greece) Antonia Karagiaouridou (Greece) Petroula Toga	1	4

Quarter-finals
(Greece) Chrisa Georgali (Greece) Christina Mavromatidou	15	15
(Greece) I. Boutakidou (Greece) E. Politova	1	1
(Romania) Carmen Blanaru (Romania) Florentina Petre	15	5	11
(Bulgaria) Dimitriyka Dimitrova (Bulgaria) Diana Dimova	12	15	15
(Turkey) Öznur Çalışkan (Turkey) Rabia Kemer	17	12	10
(Moldova) Natalia Coseli (Moldova) Nadejda Litvinenco	15	15	15
(Romania) Irina Popescu (Romania) Adina Posteucă	3	2
(Bulgaria) Petya Nedelcheva (Bulgaria) Maya Ivanova	15	15

Semi-finals
(Greece) Chrisa Georgali (Greece) Christina Mavromatidou	w	/	o
(Bulgaria) Dimitriyka Dimitrova (Bulgaria) Diana Dimova
(Moldova) Natalia Coseli (Moldova) Nadejda Litvinenco	1	2
(Bulgaria) Petya Nedelcheva (Bulgaria) Maya Ivanova	15	15

Final
(Bulgaria) Dimitriyka Dimitrova (Bulgaria) Diana Dimova	w	/	o
(Bulgaria) Petya Nedelcheva (Bulgaria) Maya Ivanova

== Mixed doubles ==
=== Finals ===
Semi-finals
(Romania) Robert Ciobotaru (Romania) Florentina Petre	15	15
(Bulgaria) Stiliyan Makarski (Bulgaria) Diana Dimova	5	7
(Moldova) Maxim Carpenco (Moldova) Nadejda Litvinenco	15	6	13
(Bulgaria) Konstantin Dobrev (Bulgaria) Maya Ivanova	6	15	15

Final
(Romania) Robert Ciobotaru (Romania) Florentina Petre	13	3
(Bulgaria) Konstantin Dobrev (Bulgaria) Maya Ivanova	15	15

=== Top half ===
==== Section 1 ====
First round
(Serbia and Montenegro) M Stanković (Serbia and Montenegro) A Gligorić	1	1
(Romania) F Posteucă (Romania) A Posteucă	15	15

Second round
(Romania) R Ciobotaru (Romania) F Petre	15	15
(Turkey) K Akcebe (Turkey) Ö Çalışkan	5	9
(Turkey) A Kose (Turkey) N Ekin	3	3
(Romania) F Posteucă (Romania) A Posteucă	15	15

Quarter-finals
(Romania) R Ciobotaru (Romania) F Petre	15	15
(Romania) F Posteucă (Romania) A Posteucă	9	9

==== Section 2 ====
First round
(Serbia and Montenegro) Ž Petrović (Serbia and Montenegro) M Glogovac	8	11
(Greece) D Giagtzis (Greece) N Pliaka	15	15
(Bulgaria) S Makarski (Bulgaria) D Dimova	15	15
(North Macedonia) J Markovski (Greece) E. Politova	2	7

Second round
(Bulgaria) V Metodiev (Bulgaria) P Nedelcheva	15	15
(Greece) D Giagtzis (Greece) N Pliaka	0	0
(North Macedonia) S Vuksanović (North Macedonia) I Jovanovska	3	3
(Bulgaria) S Makarski (Bulgaria) D Dimova	15	15

Quarter-finals
(Bulgaria) V Metodiev (Bulgaria) P Nedelcheva	15	14	12
(Bulgaria) S Makarski (Bulgaria) D Dimova	6	17	15

=== Bottom half ===
==== Section 3 ====
First round
(Bulgaria) K Jankov (Bulgaria) D Dimitrova	15	15
(Turkey) H Erdinç (Greece) C Diamantopoulou	10	8
(Serbia and Montenegro) N Marjanović (Serbia and Montenegro) A Mihajl	2	1
(Turkey) H H Durakcan (Turkey) R Kemer	15	15

Second round
(Bulgaria) K Jankov (Bulgaria) D Dimitrova	15	15
(Greece) A Ioannidis (Greece) P Toga	2	0
(Turkey) H H Durakcan (Turkey) R Kemer	14	3
(Moldova) M Carpenco (Moldova) N Litvinenco	17	15

Quarter-finals
(Bulgaria) K Jankov (Bulgaria) D Dimitrova	11	8
(Moldova) M Carpenco (Moldova) N Litvinenco	15	15

==== Section 4 ====
First round
(Serbia and Montenegro) R Jovović (Serbia and Montenegro) M Bulatović	8	1
(Romania) F Patroaica (Romania) C Blanaru	15	15
(Bulgaria) K Dobrev (Bulgaria) M Ivanova	15	15
(Greece) A Neofitos (Greece) I Boutakidou	4	1

Second round
(Romania) F Patroaica (Romania) C Blanaru	15	10	11
(Greece) P Skarlatos (Greece) A Karagiaouridou	8	15	15
(Bulgaria) K Dobrev (Bulgaria) M Ivanova	12	15	15
(Romania) G Constantinescu (Romania) I Popescu	15	12	11

Quarter-finals
(Greece) P Skarlatos (Greece) A Karagiaouridou	2	4
(Bulgaria) K Dobrev (Bulgaria) M Ivanova	15	15

== Team event ==
=== Group stage ===
==== Group A ====
Pos	Team	Pld	W	L	MF	MA	MD	Pts	Qualification
1	Bulgaria	2	2	0	10	0	+10	2	Advance to knockout stage
2	Greece (H)	2	1	1	3	7	−4	1	Advance to knockout stage
3	Turkey	2	0	2	2	8	−6	0	Advance to classification round

Source: Hellenic Badminton Federation
(H) Host

==== Group B ====
Pos	Team	Pld	W	L	MF	MA	MD	Pts	Qualification
1	Romania	2	3	0	13	2	+11	3	Advance to knockout stage
2	Moldova	2	2	1	7	8	−1	2	Advance to knockout stage
3	Serbia and Montenegro	2	1	2	5	10	−5	1	Advance to classification round
4	Greece B	2	0	3	5	10	−5	0	

Source: Hellenic Badminton Federation

=== Classification round ===
Turkey
3
Omonoia Sports Center
17 June 2005

Serbia and Montenegro
2

		Result
1	Hasan Hüseyin Durakcan; Rabia Kemer	2 – 0	Žarko Petrović; Marija Glogovac
2	Kamil Akcebe	1 – 2	Radomir Jovović
3	Öznur Çalışkan	2 – 0	Marija Bulatović
4	Hasan Erdinç; Aydan Kose	1 – 2	Milan Barbir; Radomir Jovović
5	Öznur Çalışkan; Rabia Kemer	2 – 0	Aleksandra Gligorić; Marija Glogovac

=== Knockout stage ===
==== Bracket ====
Semi-finals
Bulgaria	3
Moldova	0
Greece	1
Romania	3

Final
Bulgaria	3
Romania	0
Third place
Moldova	1
Greece	3

==== Semi-finals ====
Bulgaria
3
Omonoia Sports Center
17 June 2005

Moldova
0

		Result
1	Georgi Petrov	2 – 0	Maxim Carpenco
2	Petya Nedelcheva	2 – 0	Nadejda Litvinenco
3	Stiliyan Makarski; Vladimir Metodiev	2 – 0	Maxim Carpenco; Igor Ursatii
4	Dimitriyka Dimitrova; Diana Dimova	– Not played	Natalia Coseli; Nadejda Litvinenco
5	Dimitriyka Dimitrova; Diana Dimova	– Not played	Igor Ursatii; Natalia Coseli

Romania
3
Omonoia Sports Center
17 June 2005

Greece
1

		Result
1	Robert Ciobotaru; Florentina Petre	2 – 0	Panagiotis Skarlatos; Antonia Karagiaouridou
2	Florin Posteucă	1 – 2	Theodoros Velkos
3	Adina Posteucă	2 – 0	Chrisa Georgali
4	Robert Ciobotaru; George Constantinescu	2 – 0	Nektarios Giagtzis; Panagiotis Skarlatos
5	Carmen Blanaru; Florentina Petre	– Not played	Chrisa Georgali; Christina Mavromatidou

==== Third place ====
Greece
3
Omonoia Sports Center
17 June 2005

Moldova
1

		Result
1	Panagiotis Skarlatos; Antonia Karagiaouridou	1 – 2	Maxim Carpenco; Nadejda Litvinenco
2	Theodoros Velkos	2 – 0	Maxim Carpenco
3	Chrisa Georgali	2 – 1	Nadejda Litvinenco
4	Panagiotis Skarlatos; Theodoros Velkos	2 – 1	Maxim Carpenco; Igor Ursatii
5	Chrisa Georgali; Christina Mavromatidou	– Not played	Natalia Coseli; Nadejda Litvinenco

==== Final ====
Bulgaria
3
Omonoia Sports Center
17 June 2005

Romania
0

		Result
1	Georgi Petrov	2 – 0	Florin Posteucă
2	Petya Nedelcheva	2 – 0	Adina Posteucă
3	Konstantin Dobrev; Georgi Petrov	2 – 0	Robert Ciobotaru; George Constantinescu
4	Dimitriyka Dimitrova; Diana Dimova	– Not played	Carmen Blanaru; Florentina Petre
5	Stiliyan Makarski; Diana Dimova	– Not played	Robert Ciobotaru; Florentina Petre
