= Bulgarian National Badminton Championships =

The Bulgarian National Badminton Championships is a tournament organized to crown the best badminton players in Bulgaria. They are held since 1985. The same year the junior championships and the Bulgarian International started.

== Past winners ==
Year	Men's singles	Women's singles	Men's doubles	Women's doubles	Mixed doubles
1985	Jeliazko Valkov	Diana Koleva	Ilko Orechov; Nanko Ertchopov	Diana Koleva; Zlatka Valkanova	Jeliazko Valkov; Dobrinka Peneva
1986	Jeliazko Valkov	Diana Koleva	Jeliazko Valkov; Dinko Dukov	Diana Koleva; Petia Borisova	Ilko Okreshkov; Elena Velinova
1987	Stanimir Boitchinov	Diana Koleva	Jeliazko Valkov; Dinko Dukov	Diana Koleva; Diana Filipova	Jeliazko Valkov; Gabriela Spasova
1988	Jeliazko Valkov	Diana Koleva	Jeliazko Valkov; Dinko Dukov	Diana Koleva; Emilia Dimitrova	Jeliazko Valkov; Irina Dimitrova
1989	Stanimir Boitchinov	Diana Koleva	Jeliazko Valkov; Dinko Dukov	Diana Koleva; Emilia Dimitrova	Jeliazko Valkov; Diana Filipova
1990	Stoyan Ivantchev	Diana Koleva	Slantcezar Tzankov; Anatoliy Skripko	Diana Koleva; Emilia Dimitrova	Anatoliy Skripko; Diana Filipova
1991	Stoyan Ivantchev	Victoria Hristova	Stoyan Ivantchev; Anatoliy Skripko	Diana Koleva; Emilia Dimitrova	Jeliazko Valkov; Emilia Dimitrova
1992	Jassen Borissov	Diana Koleva	Jeliazko Valkov; Sibin Atanasov	Diana Koleva; Diana Filipova	Slantchezar Tzankov; Diana Filipova
1993	Todor Velkov	Dimitrinka Dimitrova	Boris Kesov; Anatoliy Skripko	Victoria Hristova; Nelly Nedjalkova	Svetoslav Stoyanov; Emilia Dimitrova
1994	Mihail Popov	Victoria Hristova	Svetoslav Stoyanov; Mihail Popov	Raina Tzvetkova; Emilia Dimitrova	Svetoslav Stoyanov; Raina Tzvetkova
1995	Todor Velkov	Neli Nedialkova	Svetoslav Stoyanov; Mihail Popov	Raina Tzvetkoa; Victoria Hristova	Svetoslav Stoyanov; Raina Tzvetkova
1996	Mihail Popov	Victoria Hristova	Svetoslav Stoyanov; Mihail Popov	Victoria Hristova; Neli Nedialkova	Svetoslav Stoyanov; Raina Tzvetkova
1997	Boris Kessov	Raina Tzvetkova	Svetoslav Stoyanov; Mihail Popov	Victoria Hristova; Dobrinka Smilianova	Svetoslav Stoyanov; Raina Tzvetkova
1998	Mihail Popov	Victoria Hristova	Svetoslav Stoyanov; Mihail Popov	Victoria Hristova; Raina Tzvetkova	Svetoslav Stoyanov; Raina Tzvetkova
1999	Boris Kessov	Neli Boteva	Boris Kessov; Tzvetozar Kolev	Raina Tzvetkova; Petya Nedelcheva	Konstantin Dobrev; Petya Nedelcheva
2000	Luben Panov	Petya Nedelcheva	Konstantin Dobrev; Luben Panov	Petya Nedelcheva; Neli Boteva	Konstantin Dobrev; Petya Nedelcheva
2001	Konstantin Dobrev	Petya Nedelcheva	Konstantin Dobrev; Luben Panov	Petya Nedelcheva; Maya Ivanova	Konstantin Dobrev; Petya Nedelcheva
2002	Boris Kessov	Petya Nedelcheva	Konstantin Dobrev; Georgi Petrov	Petya Nedelcheva; Nely Boteva	Boris Kessov; Nely Boteva
2003	Georgi Petrov	Nely Boteva	Julian Hristov; Boris Kessov	Petya Nedelcheva; Diana Koleva	Julian Hristov; Diana Dimova
2004	Yulian Hristov	Petya Nedelcheva	Stiliyan Makarski; Vladimir Metodiev	Petya Nedelcheva; Nely Boteva	Vladimir Metodiev; Petya Nedelcheva
2005	Kostantin Dobrev	Petya Nedelcheva	Konstantin Dobrev; Georgi Petrov	Petya Nedelcheva; Maya Lvanova	Vladimir Metodiev; Petya Nedelcheva
2006	Georgi Petrov	Petya Nedelcheva	Georgi Petrov; Blagovest Kisiov	Petya Nedelcheva; Diana Dimova	Vladimir Metodiev; Petya Nedelcheva
2007	Georgi Petrov	Petya Nedelcheva	Vladimir Metodiev; Stiliyan Makarski	Petya Nedelcheva; Diana Dimova	Vladimir Metodiev; Diana Dimova
2008	Stiliyan Makarski	Petya Nedelcheva	Vladimir Metodiev; Krasimir Yankov	Petya Nedelcheva; Diana Dimova	Stiliyan Makarski; Diana Dimova
2009	Krasimir Yankov	Petya Nedelcheva	Vladimir Metodiev; Krasimir Yankov	Petya Nedelcheva; Dimitria Popstoykova	Stiliyan Makarski; Diana Dimova
2010	Stiliyan Makarski	Petya Nedelcheva	Stiliyan Makarski; Peyo Boichinov	Petya Nedelcheva; Diana Dimova	Stiliyan Makarski; Diana Dimova
2011	Peyo Boichinov	Petya Nedelcheva	Stiliyan Makarski; Peyo Boichinov	Petya Nedelcheva; Diana Dimova	Stiliyan Makarski; Diana Dimova
2012	Krasimir Yankov	Dimitria Popstoikova	Konstantin Dobrev; Blagovest Kisiov	Petya Nedelcheva; Diana Dimova	Stiliyan Makarski; Diana Dimova
2013	Ivan Rusev	Petya Nedelcheva	Vladimir Metodiev; Yulian Hristov	Mila Ivanova; Mariya Mitsova	Ivan Rusev; Petya Nedelcheva
2014	Vladimir Shishkov	Stefani Stoeva	Konstantin Dobrev; Ivan Rusev	Stefani Stoeva; Gabriela Stoeva	Ivan Rusev; Petya Nedelcheva
2015	Ivan Rusev	Linda Zechiri	Konstantin Dobrev; Dimitar Delchev	Stefani Stoeva; Gabriela Stoeva	Philip Shishov; Dimitria Popstoikova
2016	Daniel Nikolov	Petya Nedelcheva	Alex Vlaar; Philip Shishov	Mariya Mitsova; Petya Nedelcheva	Alex Vlaar; Petya Nedelcheva
2017	Daniel Nikolov	Linda Zechiri	Alex Vlaar; Philip Shishov	Stefani Stoeva; Gabriela Stoeva	Philip Shishov; Stefani Stoeva
2018	Daniel Nikolov	Stefani Stoeva	Ivan Rusev; Dimitar Yanakiev	Stefani Stoeva; Gabriela Stoeva	Alex Vlaar; Mariya Mitsova
2019	Ivan Rusev	Mariya Mitsova	Peyo Boichinov; Ivan Panev	Gabriela Stoeva; Stefani Stoeva	Ivan Rusev; Mariya Mitsova
2020	Daniel Nikolov	Stefani Stoeva	Alex Vlaar; Peyo Boichinov	Gabriela Stoeva; Stefani Stoeva	Alex Vlaar; Mariya Mitsova
2021	Daniel Nikolov	Stefani Stoeva	Daniel Nikolov; Dimitar Yanakiev	Gabriela Stoeva; Stefani Stoeva	Stiliyan Makarski; Diana Makarska
2022	Daniel Nikolov	Stefani Stoeva	Daniel Nikolov; Peyo Boichinov	Gabriela Stoeva; Stefani Stoeva	Daniel Nikolov; Gabriela Stoeva
2023	Daniel Nikolov	Stefani Stoeva	Daniel Nikolov; Peyo Boichinov	Gabriela Stoeva; Stefani Stoeva	Daniel Nikolov; Stefani Stoeva
2024	Dimitar Yanakiev	Stefani Stoeva	Stiliyan Makarski; Ivan Rusev	Gabriela Stoeva; Stefani Stoeva	Stiliyan Makarski; Diana Makarska
2025	Dimitar Yanakiev	Kaloyana Nalbantova	Daniel Nikolov; Dimitar Yanakiev	Gabriela Stoeva; Stefani Stoeva	Stiliyan Makarski; Hristomira Popovska

=== Junior champions ===
Year	Men's singles	Women's singles	Men's doubles	Women's doubles	Mixed doubles
1985	Georgy Lazarov	Irina Dimitrova	Georgy Lazarov; Trendafil Balinov	Zornitza Pavlova; Ljudmila Ilkova	Georgy Lazarov; Irina Dimitrova
1986	Stoyan Ivantschev	Gabriela Spasova	Tihomir Milov; Trendafil Balinov	Irina Dimitrova; Gabriela Spasova	Trendafil Balinov; Irina Dimitrova
1987	Julian Alexandrov	Aneta Stamboliiska	Boris Lalov; Stoyan Ivantschev	Aneta Stamboliiska; Gabriela Spasova	Boris Lalov; Gabriela Spasova
1988	Vasil Petkov	Diana Filipova	Vasil Petkov; Ignat Ignatov	Diana Filipova; Emilia Dimitrova	Jasen Borisov; Aneta Stamboliiska
1989	Andon Kolev	Diana Filipova	Andon Kolev; Vasil Zinkov	Nelly Nedjalkova; Emilia Dimitrova	Ignat Ignatov; Diana Filipova
1990	Nikolay Dimitrov	Nelly Nedjalkova	Nikolay Dimitrov; Yordan Manuilov	Nelly Nedjalkova; Raina Tzvetkova	Nikolay Dimitrov; Emilia Dimitrova
1991	Yordan Manuilov	Nelly Nedjalkova	Nikolay Dimitrov; Yordan Manuilov	Nelly Nedjalkova; Bogdanka Bontcheva	Yordan Manuilov; Nelly Nedjalkova
1992	Sibin Atanasov	Victoria Hristova	Luben Panov; Konstantin Dobrev	Nelly Nedjalkova; B. Nikolaeva	Yordan Manuilov; Nelly Nedjalkova
1993	Svetoslav Stoyanov	Tatjana Hristova	Svetoslav Stoyanov; Mihail Popov	Tatjana Hristova; Martina Kassimova	Svetoslav Stoyanov; Raina Tzvetkova
1994	Todor Velkov	Dimitriyka Dimitrova	Svetoslav Stoyanov; Mihail Popov	Raina Tzvetkova; Dragomira Vassileva	Svetoslav Stoyanov; Raina Tzvetkova
1995	Todor Velkov	Dobrinka Smilianova	Todor Velkov; Boris Kessov	Anelia Hristova; Dobrinka Smilianova	Tzvetozar Kolev; Dagomira Vassileva
1996	Ivan Sotirov	Dobrinka Smilianova	Konstantin Petkov; Danail Ivanov	Dobrinka Smilianova; Borislava Petkova	Ivan Sotirov; Dobrinka Smilianova
1997	Ivan Sotirov	Dobrinka Smilianova	Ivan Sotirov; Ivan Kolev	Margarita Mladenova; Dobrinka Smilianova	Ivan Sotirov; Dobrinka Smilianova
1998	Georgi Petrov	Dimitriyka Dimitrova	Georgi Petrov; Nikolay Angelov	Dimitriyka Dimitrova; Margarita Mladenova	Alexey Shishov; Dimitriyka Dimitrova
1999	Georgi Petrov	Dimitriyka Dimitrova	Georgi Petrov; Nikolay Angelov	Dimitriyka Dimitrova; Sibela Tarakchieva	Georgi Petrov; Pavlina Petkova
2000	Ilian Iliev	Tatiana Viteva	Ilian Iliev; Mihail Emilov	Tatiana Viteva; Denica Petcova	Iskren Atanasov; Tatiana Viteva
2001	Mihail Emilov	Petya Nedelcheva	Ilian Iliev; Mihail Emilov	Petya Nedelcheva; Maya Ivanova	Stefan Lutzkanov; Petya Nedelcheva
2002	Julian Hristov	Petya Nedeltcheva	Julian Hristov; Vladimir Metodiev	Petya Nedeltcheva; Maya Ivanova	Julian Hristov; Diana Dimova
2003	Julian Hristov	Diana Dimova	Julian Hristov; Krasimir Jankov	Diana Dimova; Doroteia Nenkova	Julian Hristov; Diana Dimova
2004	Krasimir Yankov	Delayna Yankova	Blagovest Kisyov; Radoslav Simeonov	Delyana Yankova; Delyana Trandeva	Blagovest Kisyov; Delyana Yankova
2005	Tihomir Hadzhiev	Gabriela Banova	Tihomir Hadzhiev; Radoslav Ganchev	Gabriela Banova; Delyana Trandeva	Radoslav Simeonov; Gabgiela Banova
2006	Tihomir Hadzhiev	Gabriela Banova	Tihomir Hadzhiev; Radoslav Ganchev	Rumiana Ivanova; Desislava Simeonova	Tihomir Hadjiev; Rumiana Ivanova
2007	Peio Boichinov	Dimitria Popstoikova	Philip Shishov; Aleksandar Grigorov	Miroslava Ivanova; Bistra Maneva	Ilian Krastev; Dimitria Popstoikova
2008	Borislav Andreev	Bistra Maneva	Borislav Andreev; Simeon Motev	Bistra Maneva; Monika Ivanova	Borislav Andreev; Bistra Maneva
2009	Borislav Andreev	Bistra Maneva	Borislav Andreev; Simeon Motev	Lubomira Stoynova; Viktoria Tzvetanova	Borislav Andreev; Viktoria Tzetanova
2010	Gergin Nedialkov	Stefani Gudjenova	Ivan Trakov; Ivan Hristozov	Stefani Gudjenova; Rositza Tinkova	Ivan Trakov; Rositza Tinkova
2011	Ivan Rusev	Viktoria Dzeleva	Ivan Trakov; Ivan Hristozov	Viktoria Dzeleva; Karolina Tzankova	Mihail Mihailov; Bogdana Tzankova
2012	Vladimir Shishkov	Anna-Mariay Tzaneva	Vladimir Shishkov; Dimitar Yanakiev	Emilia Kaneva; Anna-Mariya Tzaneva	Vladimir Shishkov; Anna-Mariya Tzaneva
2013	Stefan Garev	Bojidara Topuzova	Stefan Garev; Dimitar Delchev	Tzebete Asenova; Mila Ivanova	Stefan Garev; Bojidara Topuzova
2014	Stefan Garev	Mariya Mitsova	Stefan Garev; Ventzislav Videlov	Mila Ivanova; Mariya Mitsova	Stefan Garev; Mila Ivanova
2015	Vladimir Shishkov	Mariya Mitsova	Danail Balkanski; Vladimir Shishkov	Mariya Mitsova; Liliya Stoyanova	Vladimir Shishkov; Mariya Mitsova
2016	Daniel Nikolov	Anna-Maria Tsaneva	Daniel Nikolov; Ivan Panev	Paulina Krasteva; Anna-Maria Tsaneva	Vladimir Shishkov; Anna-Maria Tsaneva
2017	Alex Popov	Maria Delcheva	Denis Marinov; Alex Popov	Paola Kirova; Hristomira Popovska	Denis Marinov; Paola Kirova
2018	Iliyan Stoynov	Maria Delcheva	Iliyan Stoynov; Cvetomir Stoyanov	Maria Delcheva; Hristomira Popovska	Iliyan Stoynov; Hristomira Popovska
2019	Iliyan Stoynov	Petia Kasabova	Yavor Yankov; Cvetomir Stoyanov	Petia Kasabova; Ira Spiridonova	Dimitar Nenchev; Ira Spiridonova
2020	Evgeni Panev	Gergana Pavlova	Stivan Nikolaev; Teodor Petrov	Gergana Pavlova; Tania Ivanova	Stivan Nikolaev; Gergana Pavlova
2021	Evgeni Panev	Gergana Pavlova	Stivan Nikolaev; Evgeni Panev	Gergana Pavlova; Tania Ivanova	Stivan Nikolaev; Gergana Pavlova
2022	Stanimir Terziev	Kaloyana Nalbantova	Georgi Kirov; Yavor Christov	Cvetina Popivanova; Mihaela Chepisheva	Nikolai Davchev; Mihaela Chepisheva
2023	Stanimir Terziev	Tsveti Katerova	Stanimir Terziev; Yavor Christov	Sinem Yıldız; Ece Mert	Stanimir Terziev; Cvetina Popivanova
2024	Tsvetan Ivanov	Kaloyana Nalbantova	Patrik Dimitrov; Tsvetan Ivanov	Tsveti Katerova; Raia Pashova	Tsvetan Ivanov; Raia Pashova
2025	Tsvetan Ivanov	Decislava Karkadakova	Martin Stratiev; Tsvetan Ivanov	Decislava Karkadakova; Raia Pashova	Yordan Yordanov; Decislava Karkadakova
