= Greek National Badminton Championships =

The Greek National Badminton Championships is a tournament organized to crown the best badminton players in Greece. They are held since 1990.

== Past winners ==
Year	Men's singles	Women's singles	Men's doubles	Women's doubles	Mixed doubles
1990	George Tsavlakidis	Stephanie Giantsi	Charalambos Kazilas; Stepan Partemian	Ruth Scott; Stephanie Giantsi	Stepan Partemian; Alexandra Georgaki
1991	George Tsavlakidis	Ruth Scott	D. Antoniou; Stepan Partemian	Ruth Scott; Stephanie Giantsi	Jannis Organlis; Alexandra Georgaki
1992	Jannis Organlis	Stephanie Giantsi	George Georgoudis; Dukof	Ruth Scott; Stephanie Giantsi	Potten; Ruth Scott
1993	Stepan Patremian	Christiana Iliopoulou	George Georgoudis; Stepan Partemian	Floriana Iliopoulou; Christiana Iliopoulou	George Georgoudis; Papapostolou
1994	Pavlos Charalambidis	Christiana Iliopoulou	George Georgoudis; Gerostergiou	Floriana Iliopoulou; Christiana Iliopoulou	George Georgoudis; Christiana Iliopoulou
1995	Pavlos Charalampidis	Ruth Scott	Pavlos Charalampidis; Kexlimparis	Ruth Scott; Orzel	George Georgoudis; Ruth Scott
1996	Pavlos Charalampidis	Elena Kenta	Pavlos Charalampidis; Kexlimparis	Ruth Scott; Christiana Iliopoulou	George Georgoudis; Ruth Scott
1997	Christos Tsartsidis	Elena Kenta	Christos Tsartsidis; Panagiotis Pakaiser	Ruth Scott; Irini Hatzara	Aristidis Ktenioudakis; Elena Kenta
1998	Vasilios Velkos	Savato Avramidou	Pavlos Charalambidis; George Galvas	Savvato Avramidou; Sotiroglou	Giorgos Patis; Chrisa Georgali
1999	Vasilios Velkos	Antonia Karagiaouridou	Vasilios Velkos; Giorgos Patis	Antonia Karagiaouridou; Stella Theodoridou	Vasilios Velkos; Chrisa Georgali
2000	Theodoros Velkos	Antonia Karagiaouridou	Vasilios Velkos; Evadros Votsis	Antonia Karagiaouridou; Stella Theodoridou	Theodoros Velkos; Chrisa Georgali
2001	Theodoros Velkos	Chrisa Georgali	Theodoros Velkos; Giorgos Patis	Chrisa Georgali; Evagelia Tetradi	Giorgos Patis; Chrisa Georgali
2002	Pavlos Charalambidis	Christina Mavromatidou	Pavlos Charalambidis; Christos Tsartsidis	Anna Charalambidou; Stavroula Poutoka	Pavlos Charalambidis; Anna Charalambidou
2003	Pavlos Charalambidis	Christina Mavromatidou	Pavlos Charalambidis; Christos Tsartsidis	Chrisa Georgali; Christina Mavromatidou	George Charalabidis; Chrisa Georgali
2004	Pavlos Charalambidis	Christina Mavromatidou	Pavlos Charalambidis; Christos Tsartsidis	Chrisa Georgali; Susana Samara	Theodoros Velkos; Evaggelia Tetradi
2005	Theodoros Velkos	Christina Mavromatidou	Georgios Charalambidis; Panagiotis Skarlatos	Chrisa Georgali; Ioanna Karkantzia	Georgios Charalambidis; Chrisa Georgali
2006	Theodoros Velkos	Chrisa Georgali	Giorgos Patis; Theodoros Velkos	Elena Iakovou; Ioanna Karkantzia	Giorgos Patis; Chrisa Georgali
2007	Theodoros Velkos	Elena Iakovou	Giorgos Patis; Theodoros Velkos	Elena Iakovou; Charalambidou Anna	Panagiotis Skarlatos; Antonia Karagiaouridou
2008	Skarlatos Panagiotis	Theodora Ligomenou	Georgios Charalambidis; Theodoros Velkos	Diamantopoulou Christina; Kyriaki Aslanidi	Georgios Charalambidis; Ismini Papathanasiou
2009	Georgios Charalambidis	Theodora Ligomenou	Georgios Galvas; Kiomourtzidis Vasilis	Theodora Ligomenou; Ioanna Karkantzia	Georgios Charalambidis; Fotini Stavrousi
2010	Georgios Charalambidis	Theodora Ligomenou	Theodoros Velkos; Georgios Charalambidis	Theodora Ligomenou; Ioanna Karkantzia	Stefanos Xanthopoulos; Anna Giannakidou
2011	Georgios Charalambidis	Theodora Ligomenou	Georgios Charalambidis; Dimitrios Orlis	Theodora Ligomenou; Ioanna Karkantzia	Theodoros Velkos; Irini Tenta
2012	Panagiotis Skarlatos	Theodora Ligomenou	Georgios Galvas; Panagiotis Skarlatos	Kyriaki Aslanidi; Christina Diamantopoulou	Ilias Xanthou; Antonia Karagiaouridou
2013	Ilias Xanthou	Theodora Ligomenou	Georgios Galvas; Panagiotis Skarlatos	Evgenia Vaggeli; Christina Diamantopoulou	Thomas Leventis; Antonia Karagiaouridou
2014	Ilias Xanthou	Eleni Papadopoulou	Dimitrios Chrisochoou; Antonios Chatzifotis	Irini Tenta; Eleni Melikidou	Thomas Leventis; Eleni Papadopoulou
2015	Panagiotis Skarlatos	Iliana Mantouka	Georgios Galvas; Panagiotis Skarlatos	Aristea Apostolidou; Eleni Melikidou	Stamatis Tsigirdakis; Ioanna Kontou-Founta
2016	Ilias Xanthou	Eleni Papadopoulou	Georgios Galvas; Panagiotis Skarlatos	Eleni Papadopoulou; Eleni Melikidou	Panagiotis Skarlatos; Eleni Melikidou
2017	Stamatis Tsigirdakis	Polyvia Tzika	Georgios Galvas; Panagiotis Skarlatos	Zoi Aleli; Polyvia Tzika	Paschalis Melikidis; Eleni Melikidou
2018	Stamatis Tsigirdakis	Polyvia Tzika	Georgios Galvas; Panagiotis Skarlatos	Zoi Aleli; Eleni Papadopoulou	Georgios Galvas; Polyvia Tzika
2019	Panagiotis Skarlatos	Irini Tenta	Petros Tentas; Stamatis Tsigirdakis	Irini Tenta; Irini Gougleri	Petros Tentas; Irini Gougleri
2020	Stamatis Tsigirdakis	Grammatoula Sotiriou	Paschalis Melikidis; Panagiotis Skarlatos	Theodora Lambrianidou; Grammatoula Sotiriou	Georgios Orfeas Tsamousiadis; Theodora Lambrianidou
2021	Paschalis Melikidis	Grammatoula Sotiriou	Paschalis Melikidis; Panagiotis Skarlatos	Theodora Lambrianidou; Grammatoula Sotiriou	Andreas Bittner; Theodora Lambrianidou
2022	Stamatis Tsigirdakis	Grammatoula Sotiriou	Petros Tentas; Stamatis Tsigirdakis	Theodora Lambrianidou; Grammatoula Sotiriou	Ilias Xanthou; Theodora Fragoulidou
2023	Paschalis Melikidis	Grammatoula Sotiriou	Paschalis Melikidis; Axilleas Tsartsidis	Athanasia Paulina Vlachantoni; Antonia Petroula Vlachantoni	Stamatis Tsigirdakis; Theodora Lambrianidou
2024	Stamatis Tsigirdakis	Grammatoula Sotiriou	George Galvas; Ilias Xanthou	Ekaterini Spyridopoulou; Theodora Lambrianidou	Stamatis Tsigirdakis; Theodora Lambrianidou
2025	Paschalis Melikidis	Grammatoula Sotiriou	Paschalis Melikidis; Axilleas Tsartsidis	Melina Maria Anastasiou; Grammatoula Sotiriou	Evangelos Stavros Anastasiou; Grammatoula Sotiriou
