= Badminton at the 2004 Summer Olympics – Men's doubles =

Men's doubles at the Games of the XXVIII Olympiad
- Venue: Goudi Olympic Hall
- Date: 14–20 August 2004
- Competitors: 22 from 14 nations

Medalists
1st place, gold medalist(s)		Ha Tae-kwon; Kim Dong-moon	South Korea
2nd place, silver medalist(s)		Lee Dong-soo; Yoo Yong-sung	South Korea
3rd place, bronze medalist(s)		Eng Hian; Flandy Limpele	Indonesia

These are the results of the men's doubles competition in badminton at the 2004 Summer Olympics in Athens.

South Korea's Ha Tae-kwon and Kim Dong-moon defeated compatriots Lee Dong-soo and Yoo Yong-sung in the final, 15–11, 15–4, to win the gold medal in men's doubles badminton at the 2004 Summer Olympics. This was Kim's second Olympic gold medal, after winning the mixed doubles event in 1996, and third Olympic medal overall after winning a bronze medal in the men's doubles event in 2000. In the bronze-medal match, Indonesia's Eng Hian and Flandy Limpele defeated Denmark's Jens Eriksen and Martin Lundgaard Hansen, 15–13, 15–7.

== Seeds ==
1. Jonas Rasmussen and Lars Paaske (DEN) (second round)
2. Cai Yun and Fu Haifeng (CHN) (quarterfinals)
3. Ha Tae-kwon and Kim Dong-moon (KOR) (gold medalist)
4. Choong Tan Fook and Lee Wan Wah (MAS) (quarterfinals)
5. Jens Eriksen and Martin Lundgaard Hansen (DEN) (fourth place)
6. Sang Yang and Zheng Bo (CHN) (quarterfinals)
7. Alvent Yulianto Chandra and Luluk Hadiyanto (INA) (second round)
8. Eng Hian and Flandy Limpele (INA) (bronze medalist)

== Draw ==
=== Finals ===
Semifinals
8	Eng Hian (INA); Flandy Limpele (INA)	8	2
3	Kim Dong-moon (KOR); Ha Tae-kwon (KOR)	15	15
Lee Dong-soo (KOR); Yoo Yong-sung (KOR)	9	15	15
5	Jens Eriksen (DEN); M. Hansen (DEN)	15	5	3

Final
3	Kim Dong-moon (KOR); Ha Tae-kwon (KOR)	15	15
Lee Dong-soo (KOR); Yoo Yong-sung (KOR)	11	4
Bronze medal match
8	Eng Hian (INA); Flandy Limpele (INA)	15	15
5	Jens Eriksen (DEN); M. Hansen (DEN)	13	7

=== Top half ===
1st round
1	L Paaske (DEN); J Rasmussen (DEN)
Bye
Kim Y (KOR); Yim B (KOR)
Bye
8	E Hian (INA); F Limpele (INA)
Bye
A Clark (GBR); N Robertson (GBR)	15	15
P Ngernsrisuk (THA); S Prapakamol (THA)	5	9
3	Kim D (KOR); Ha T (KOR)
Bye
S Budiarto (INA); T Kusharjanto (INA)	11	15	8
M Łogosz (POL); R Mateusiak (POL)	15	3	15
6	Sang Y (CHN); Zheng B (CHN)
Bye
G Patis (GRE); T Velkos (GRE)	1	4
Chan CM (MAS); Chew CE (MAS)	15	15

2nd round
1	L Paaske (DEN); J Rasmussen (DEN)	15	6	12
Kim Y (KOR); Yim B (KOR)	7	15	15
8	E Hian (INA); F Limpele (INA)	15	15
A Clark (GBR); N Robertson (GBR)	7	12
3	Kim D (KOR); Ha T (KOR)	15	15
M Łogosz (POL); R Mateusiak (POL)	9	2
6	Sang Y (CHN); Zheng B (CHN)	15	15
Chan CM (MAS); Chew CE (MAS)	11	7

Quarterfinals
Kim Y (KOR); Yim B (KOR)	1	10
8	E Hian (INA); F Limpele (INA)	15	15
3	Kim D (KOR); Ha T (KOR)	15	15
6	Sang Y (CHN); Zheng B (CHN)	7	11

Semifinals
8	E Hian (INA); F Limpele (INA)	8	2
3	Kim D (KOR); Ha T (KOR)	15	15

=== Bottom half ===
1st round
Lee D (KOR); Yoo Y (KOR)	15	15
JA Crespo (ESP); S Llopis (ESP)	3	9
Bye
7	L Hadiyanto (INA); A Yulianto (INA)
A Brehaut (AUS); T Denney (AUS)	3	9
T Panvisvas (THA); P Teerawiwatana (THA)	15	15
Bye
4	Choong TF (MAS); Lee WW (MAS)
S Carson (RSA); D James (RSA)	4	1
K Han (USA); H Bach (USA)	15	15
5	J Eriksen (DEN); M Hansen (DEN)
Bye
Bye
K Masuda (JPN); T Ohtsuka (JPN)
2	Cai Y (CHN); Fu H (CHN)
Bye

2nd round
Lee D (KOR); Yoo Y (KOR)	15	15
7	L Hadiyanto (INA); A Yulianto (INA)	11	10
T Panvisvas (THA); P Teerawiwatana (THA)	10	13
4	Choong TF (MAS); Lee WW (MAS)	15	15
K Han (USA); H Bach (USA)	6	4
5	J Eriksen (DEN); M Hansen (DEN)	15	15
K Masuda (JPN); T Ohtsuka (JPN)	7	17	9
2	Cai Y (CHN); Fu H (CHN)	15	16	15

Quarterfinals
Lee D (KOR); Yoo Y (KOR)	11	15	15
4	Choong TF (MAS); Lee WW (MAS)	15	11	9
5	J Eriksen (DEN); M Hansen (DEN)	3	15	15
2	Cai Y (CHN); Fu H (CHN)	15	11	8

Semifinals
Lee D (KOR); Yoo Y (KOR)	9	15	15
5	J Eriksen (DEN); M Hansen (DEN)	15	5	3
