= Blagovest Kisyov =

Bulgarian badminton player

Personal information
- Nickname: Blajo
- Born: Blagovest Georgiev Kisyov; 14 April 1986 (age 40) Parvomay, Bulgaria
- Height: 1.80 m (5 ft 11 in)
- Weight: 75 kg (165 lb)

Sport
- Country: Bulgaria
- Sport: Badminton

Men's singles & doubles
- Highest ranking: 114 (MS 27 August 2015); 342 (MD 5 April 2012); 194 (XD 17 January 2013)
- BWF profile

Blagovest Georgiev Kisyov (Bulgarian: Благовест Георгиев Кисьов; born 14 April 1986) is a Bulgarian badminton player.

== Career ==
Kisyov started playing badminton at the age of 10 in his home town of Parvomay. By 15, he moved to a club in a bigger city nearby in order to have better training conditions. He joined the junior national team at that time and started representing Bulgaria on various events. In 2005, he moved to Sofia and entered the National Sports Academy. In 2006, he started working as an assistant coach in the BWF Sofia training centre simultaneously while training with the national team players, and in the same year he won Bulgarian National Badminton Championships in men's doubles event. Unfortunately in 2009 he got injured in his back and had to quit playing for 1.5 years. He resumed training and competing in October 2010. He attended different training programmes and camps in Malaysia, Indonesia and Europe which has helped him obtain better knowledge and improve his game. In 2012, he won Bulgarian National Badminton Championships in men's doubles event, and became the runner-up of Bulgaria Hebar Open tournament in mixed doubles event. In 2014, he became the runner-up at Hellas International in mixed doubles event and Hatzor International tournaments in men's singles event. In 2015, he participated at the 2015 European Games in men's singles event. He reached singles round of 16 after defeated by Scott Evans of Ireland in straight games 6-21, 13–21.

== Achievements ==
=== BWF International Challenge/Series ===
Men's singles
Year	Tournament	Opponent	Score	Result
2014	Hatzor International	(Ukraine) Artem Pochtarev	0–0 Retired	(silver) Runner-up

Men's doubles
Year	Tournament	Partner	Opponent	Score	Result
2006	Hellas International	(Bulgaria) Georgi Petrov	(Canada) Kyle Holoboff (Canada) Richard Liang	–, –	(gold) Winner
2006	Hungarian International	(Bulgaria) Georgi Petrov	(Sweden) Imanuel Hirschfeld (Sweden) Imam Sodikin	18–21, 9–21	(silver) Runner-up
2006	Banu Sport International	(Bulgaria) Georgi Petrov	(Bulgaria) Vladimir Metodiev (Bulgaria) Stilian Makarski	20–22, 19–21	(silver) Runner-up

Mixed doubles
Year	Tournament	Partner	Opponent	Score	Result
2014	Hellas International	(Bulgaria) Dimitria Popstoikova	(Republic of Ireland) Sam Magee (Republic of Ireland) Chloe Magee	14–21, 10–21	(silver) Runner-up
2012	Bulgaria Hebar Open	(Bulgaria) Dimitria Popstoikova	(Austria) Roman Zirnwald (Austria) Elisabeth Baldauf	14–21, 21–11, 19–21	(silver) Runner-up

BWF International Challenge tournament
BWF International Series tournament
BWF Future Series tournament
