= George Patis =

Greek badminton player (born 1983)

Personal information
- Born: Giorgos Patis; 16 April 1983 (age 43) Thessaloniki, Greece
- Height: 1.81 m (5 ft 11 in)
- Weight: 74 kg (163 lb)

Sport
- Country: Greece
- Sport: Badminton
- Event: Men's singles & doubles

Men's singles & doubles
- BWF profile

Giorgos Patis (Greek: Γιώργος Πάτης; born 16 April 1983) is a badminton player from Greece. He competed at the 2004 Summer Olympics.

== Career ==
Patis competed in 2004 Summer Olympics in the men's doubles with partner Theodoros Velkos. They were defeated in the round of 32 by Chan Chong Ming and Chew Choon Eng of Malaysia.

== Achievements ==
=== IBF International (1 title, 2 runners-up) ===
Men's doubles
Year	Tournament	Partner	Opponent	Score	Result
2001	Cyprus International	(Greece) Theodoros Velkos	(Iran) Afshin Bozorgzadeh (Iran) Ali Shahhosseini	6–7, 5–7, 0–7	(silver) Runner-up
2001	Greece International	(Greece) Theodoros Velkos	(Bulgaria) Julian Hristov (Bulgaria) Georgi Petrov	0–7, 5–7, 3–7	(silver) Runner-up
2004	Estonian International	(Greece) Theodoros Velkos	(Wales) Jonathan Morgan (Wales) James Phillips	15–12, 15–9	(gold) Winner
