= Lilian Mihaylov =

Bulgarian badminton player (born 1998)

Personal information
- Born: 7 September 1994 (age 31) Stara Zagora, Bulgaria
- Height: 1.82 m (6 ft 0 in)
- Weight: 70 kg (154 lb)

Sport
- Country: Bulgaria
- Sport: Badminton

Men's singles & doubles
- Highest ranking: 694 (MS 13 October 2016); 178 (MD 20 August 2015); 308 (XD 7 June 2012)
- BWF profile

Lilian Mihaylov (Bulgarian: Лилиан Михайлов; born 7 September 1994) is a Bulgarian badminton player. He competed at the 2015 European Games in Baku, Azerbaijan.

== Achievements ==
=== BWF International Challenge/Series ===
Mixed doubles

Year	Tournament	Partner	Opponent	Score	Result
2016	Hellas International	(Bulgaria) Petya Nedelcheva	(Poland) Maciej Oceipa (Poland) Karolina Gajos	21–18, 21–16	(gold) Winner

BWF International Challenge tournament
BWF International Series tournament
BWF Future Series tournament
