= Cyprus International =

Badminton competition

The Cyprus International in badminton is an international open held in Cyprus since 1987. The tournament belongs to the EBU Circuit. The Cypriot National Badminton Championships started three years later.

== Winners ==
Year	Men's singles	Women's singles	Men's doubles	Women's doubles	Mixed doubles
1987	(Sweden) Peter Axelsson	(Finland) Nina Sundberg	(Sweden) Peter Axelsson (Sweden) Stefan Axelsson	(Finland) Nina Sundberg (Finland) Ulrica von Pfaler	(Sweden) Peter Axelsson (Finland) Elrica von Pfaler
1988	(Cyprus) Nicolas Pissis	(Scotland) Christine Heatly	(Cyprus) Panayiottis Poupas (Cyprus) Athos Shiakallis	(Cyprus) Matilda Kazantziak (Cyprus) Sophia Kyprianou	(Cyprus) Andros Kyprianou (Scotland) Christine Heatly
1989	(Soviet Union) Vladimir Serov	(Soviet Union) Irina Serova	(Soviet Union) Vladimir Serov (Soviet Union) Vladimir Smolin	(Soviet Union) Tatyana Arefyeva (Soviet Union) Irina Serova	(Soviet Union) Vladimir Serov (Soviet Union) Irina Serova
1990	(Bulgaria) Stoyan Ivanchev	(Bulgaria) Diana Filipova	(Bulgaria) Ivan Dobrev (Bulgaria) Pentcho Stoyanov	(Bulgaria) Diana Filipova (Bulgaria) Aneta Stamboliiska	(Bulgaria) Ivan Dobrev (Bulgaria) Diana Dilipova
1991	(Czechoslovakia) Tomasz Mendrek	(Bulgaria) Neli Nedjalkova	(Soviet Union) Anatoliy Skripko (Bulgaria) Stoyan Ivantchev	(Bulgaria) Irina Dimitrova (Bulgaria) Neli Nedjalkova	(Hungary) Attila Nagy (Hungary) Csilla Forian
1992	(Denmark) René Valentin	(Denmark) Mette Andersen	(Denmark) René Valentin (Denmark) Lars Uhre	(Italy) Beate Dejaco (Italy) Petra Irsara	(Denmark) Lars Uhre (Denmark) Mette Andersen
1993	(Cyprus) Nicolas Pissis	(Cyprus) Diana Knekna	(Slovakia) Juraj Brestovský (Slovakia) Jaroslav Heleš	(Italy) Beate Dejaco (Italy) Suzie Carnevale	(Cyprus) Nicolas Pissis (Cyprus) Diana Knekna
1994	No competition				
1995	(Italy) Klaus Raffeiner	(Italy) Maria Grazia Italiano	(Cyprus) Nicolas Pissis (Cyprus) Antonis Lazzarou	(Italy) Barbara Faiazza (Italy) Maria Grazia Italiano	(Italy) Luiggi Izo (Italy) Silvie Carnevalle
1996	(Syria) Rashad Khakhan	(Cyprus) Diana Knekna	(Bulgaria) Yasen Borisov (Bulgaria) Luben Panov	(Cyprus) Diana Knekna (Cyprus) Elena Iasonos	(Denmark) Bo Wendel (Denmark) Nina Messman
1997	(Bulgaria) Theodoros Velkos	(Israel) Svetlana Zilberman	(Israel) Paz Ben-Svi (Israel) Danny Shneiderman	(Israel) Svetlana Zilberman (Israel) Shirley Daniel	(Israel) Leon Pugach (Israel) Svetlana Zilberman
1998	(Bulgaria) Konstantin Dobrev	(Cyprus) Diana Knekna	(Denmark) Lars Nielsen (Denmark) Peter Jensen	(Bulgaria) Diana Koleva (Bulgaria) Raina Tzvetkova	(Bulgaria) Konstantin Dobrev (Bulgaria) Diana Koleva
1999	(Greece) Theodoros Velkos	(Bulgaria) Petya Nedeltcheva	(Greece) Theodoros Velkos (Greece) Vassilios Valkos	(Denmark) Nina Messman (Denmark) Karin Knudsen	(Denmark) Peter Jensen (Denmark) Nina Messman
2000	(Bulgaria) Konstantin Dobrev	(Bulgaria) Margarita Mladenova	(Bulgaria) Luben Panov (Bulgaria) Konstantin Dobrev	(Bulgaria) Diana Dimova (Bulgaria) Dobrinka Smilianova	(Israel) Leon Pugach (Israel) Svetlana Zilberman
2001	(Greece) Theodoros Velkos	(Poland) Katarzyna Krasowska	(Iran) Afshin Bozorgzadeh (Iran) Ali Shahhosseini	(Cyprus) Diana Knekna (Cyprus) Maria Ioannou	(Denmark) Peter Jensen (Cyprus) Maria Ioannou
2002	(Bulgaria) Georgi Petrov	(Poland) Katarzyna Krasowska	(Bulgaria) Georgi Petrov (Bulgaria) Julian Hristov	(Cyprus) Diana Knekna (Cyprus) Maria Ioannou	(Bulgaria) Julian Hristov (Bulgaria) Diana Dimova
2003	(Denmark) Daniel Damgaard	(Poland) Katarzyna Krasowska	(Denmark) Peter Hasbak (Denmark) Simon Mollyhus	(Denmark) Karina Sørensen (Denmark) Mette Melcher	(Denmark) Simon Mollyhus (Denmark) Karina Sørensen
2004	(Czech Republic) Petr Koukal	(Portugal) Filipa Lamy	(Republic of Ireland) Bruce Topping (Republic of Ireland) Mark Topping	(Portugal) Vânia Leça (Portugal) Filipa Lamy	(Portugal) Nuno Santos (Portugal) Telma Santos
2005	(Denmark) Daniel Damgaard	(Denmark) Line Isberg	(Denmark) Daniel Damgaard (Denmark) Jesper Hovgaard	(Denmark) Line Isberg (Denmark) Mia Nielsen	(Denmark) Jesper Hovgaard (Denmark) Mia Nielsen
2006	(Denmark) Peter Mikkelsen	(Denmark) Anne Marie Pedersen	(Denmark) Mikkel Delbo Larsen (Denmark) Jacob Chemnitz	(France) Weny Rahmawati (France) Elodie Eymard	(France) Svetoslav Stoyanov (France) Elodie Eymard
2007	(India) Chetan Anand	(Estonia) Kati Tolmoff	(Denmark) Christian Larsen (Denmark) Christian John Skovgaard	(India) Jwala Gutta (India) Shruti Kurian	(India) Chetan Anand (India) Jwala Gutta
2008	(Denmark) Kasper Ipsen	(Denmark) Camilla Overgaard	(Iceland) Magnús Ingi Helgason (Iceland) Helgi Jóhannesson	(Denmark) Maria Helsbøl (Denmark) Anne Skelbæk	(Denmark) Peter Mørk (Denmark) Maria Helsbøl
2009	(France) Simon Maunoury	(Slovenia) Špela Silvester	(Denmark) Christopher Bruun Jensen (Denmark) Morten Kronborg	(Russia) Anastasia Chervyakova (Russia) Natalia Perminova	(New Zealand) Henry Tam (New Zealand) Donna Haliday
2010	(Denmark) Viktor Axelsen	(Spain) Carolina Marín	(Indonesia) Didit Juang Indrianto (Indonesia) Seiko Wahyu Kusdianto	(Russia) Romina Gabdullina (Russia) Evgeniya Kosetskaya	(Denmark) Niclas Nøhr (Denmark) Lena Grebak
2011	(Denmark) Emil Holst	(Belgium) Lianne Tan	(Denmark) Theis Christiansen (Denmark) Niclas Nøhr	(Russia) Tatjana Bibik (Russia) Anastasia Chervaykova	(Denmark) Niclas Nøhr (Denmark) Joan Christiansen
2012	No competition				
2013	(Republic of Ireland) Scott Evans	(Bulgaria) Linda Zechiri	(Wales) Joe Morgan (Wales) Nic Strange	(Wales) Sarah Thomas (Wales) Carissa Turner	(Wales) Oliver Gwilt (Wales) Sarah Thomas
2014– 2018	No competition				
2019	(Republic of Ireland) Jonathan Dolan	(Switzerland) Jenjira Stadelmann	(Norway) Torjus Flaatten (Norway) Vegard Rikheim	(Hungary) Daniella Gonda (Hungary) Ágnes Körösi	(Switzerland) Tobias Künzi (Switzerland) Jenjira Stadelmann
2020	Cancelled (Note: This tournament, originally to be played from 8 to 11 October, was later postponed due to COVID-19 pandemic in Cyprus.)				
2021	(Kazakhstan) Dmitriy Panarin	(Bulgaria) Hristomira Popovska	(Russia) Georgii Lebedev (Russia) Gleb Stepakov	(Italy) Katharina Fink (Italy) Yasmine Hamza	(Serbia) Mihajlo Tomić (Serbia) Anđela Vitman
2022	Cancelled (Note: This tournament, originally to be played on 13 to 16 October, was later cancelled due to the COVID-19 pandemic in Cyprus.)				
2023– 2026	No competition				

== Performances by countries ==
As of the 2021 edition

Top countries
Pos	Country	MS	WS	MD	WD	XD	Total
1	Denmark	7	4	8	4	8.5	31.5
2	Bulgaria	5	6	4.5	4	3	22.5
3	Cyprus	2	3	2	4	2	13
4	Italy	1	1	0	4	1	7
5	Soviet Union	1	1	1.5	1	1	5.5
6	Israel	0	1	1	1	2	5
7	Russia	0	0	1	3	0	4
7	France	1	0	0	1	1	3
7	Greece	2	0	1	0	0	3
7	India	1	0	0	1	1	3
7	Ireland	2	0	1	0	0	3
7	Poland	0	3	0	0	0	3
7	Portugal	0	1	0	1	1	3
7	Wales	0	0	1	1	1	3
15	Finland	0	1	0	1	0.5	2.5
15	Sweden	1	0	1	0	0.5	2.5
17	Hungary	0	0	0	1	1	2
17	Switzerland	0	1	0	0	1	2
19	Scotland	0	1	0	0	0.5	1.5
20	Belgium	0	1	0	0	0	1
20	Czech Republic	1	0	0	0	0	1
20	Czechoslovakia	1	0	0	0	0	1
20	Estonia	0	1	0	0	0	1
20	Iceland	0	0	1	0	0	1
20	Indonesia	0	0	1	0	0	1
20	Iran	0	0	1	0	0	1
20	Kazakhstan	1	0	0	0	0	1
20	New Zealand	0	0	0	0	1	1
20	Norway	0	0	1	0	0	1
20	Serbia	0	0	0	0	1	1
20	Slovakia	0	0	1	0	0	1
20	Slovenia	0	1	0	0	0	1
20	Spain	0	1	0	0	0	1
20	Syria	1	0	0	0	0	1
Total		26	26	26	26	26	130
