= Papapostolou =

Papapostolou (Greek: Παπαποστόλου) is a Greek surname. Notable people with the surname include:

- Christos Papapostolou (born 1929), Greek chess master
- Miltos Papapostolou (1936–2017), Greek footballer and manager
- Periklis Papapostolou (born 1975), Greek football player
