= Lars Uhre =

Danish badminton coach

Lars Uhre (born 18 April 1972) was coach of the Danish national badminton team from 2010 to 2016.

== Career ==
Graduated from the University of Copenhagen in 2002, Uhre has a bachelor's degree in sports science and English. From 2001 to 2006, he acted as the olympic coach of the Finnish badminton team. From 2006 to 2010, he was the assistant national coach of the Danish national team. In August 2010, he was promoted to coach of the Danish national team.
