= Hellas International =

Greek badminton championships

The Hellas International or Greece International in badminton is an international open held in Athens, Greece since 2000 and are thereby one of the most recent international championships in Europe. In 2005, the tournament then upgraded to two star badminton event, the World Grand Prix with the total prize money $50,000. The tournament was held in Thessaloniki, and draws more than 120 players from 22 countries. In 2006, the tournament was known as Hellas International, and in season 2007/2008 it was introduced again in the European circuit as an BWF International Series with the total pursue $5,000.

== Previous winners ==
The table below gives an overview of the winners at the tournament.

| Year | Men's singles | Women's singles | Men's doubles | Women's doubles | Mixed doubles |
|---|---|---|---|---|---|
| 2000 | (Bulgaria) Boris Kesov | (Bulgaria) Petya Nedelcheva | (Bulgaria) Yasen Borisov (Bulgaria) Luben Panov | (Bulgaria) Diana Koleva (Bulgaria) Petya Nedelcheva | (Bulgaria) Slantchezar Tzankov (Bulgaria) Petya Nedelcheva |
| 2001 | (Greece) Theodoros Velkos | (Bulgaria) Diana Dimova | (Bulgaria) Yulian Hristov (Bulgaria) Georgi Petrov | (Greece) Chrisa Georgali (Greece) Christina Mavromatidou | (Bulgaria) Yulian Hristov (Bulgaria) Diana Dimova |
| 2002 | (Bulgaria) Georgi Petrov | (Bulgaria) Petya Nedelcheva | (Bulgaria) Konstantin Dobrev (Bulgaria) Georgi Petrov | (Bulgaria) Petya Nedelcheva (Bulgaria) Neli Boteva | (Bulgaria) Konstantin Dobrev (Bulgaria) Petya Nedelcheva |
| 2003 | (Germany) Conrad Hückstädt | (Romania) Florentina Petre | (Bulgaria) Konstantin Dobrev (Bulgaria) Georgi Petrov | (Romania) Alexandra Olariu (Romania) Florentina Petre | (Bulgaria) Yulian Hristov (Bulgaria) Diana Dimova |
| 2004 | No competition | | | | |
| 2005 | (Denmark) Niels Christian Kaldau | (Germany) Huaiwen Xu | (England) Robert Blair (England) Anthony Clark | (England) Gail Emms (England) Donna Kellogg | (England) Anthony Clark (England) Donna Kellogg |
| 2006 | (Bulgaria) Georgi Petrov | (Italy) Hui Ding | (Bulgaria) Blagovest Kisyov (Bulgaria) Georgi Petrov | (Indonesia) Atu Rosalina (Germany) Claudia Vogelgsang | (Italy) Giovanni Traina (Italy) Hui Ding |
| 2007 | (Germany) Marc Zwiebler | (Bulgaria) Petya Nedelcheva | (Malaysia) Au Kok Leong (Malaysia) Goh Ying Jin | (Bulgaria) Diana Dimova (Bulgaria) Petya Nedelcheva | (Denmark) Mads Pieler Kolding (Denmark) Line Damkjær Kruse |
| 2008 | (Chinese Taipei) Hsieh Yu-hsin | (Chinese Taipei) Hung Shih-han | (Chinese Taipei) Chien Yu-hsun (Chinese Taipei) Lin Yen-jui | (Denmark) Maria Helsbøl (Denmark) Anne Skelbæk | (Chinese Taipei) Chen Hung-ling (Chinese Taipei) Hsieh Pei-chen |
| 2009– 2012 | No competition | | | | |
| 2013 | (Malaysia) Misbun Ramdan Misbun | (Bulgaria) Linda Zetchiri | (Russia) Nikolaj Nikolaenko (Russia) Nikolai Ukk | (Turkey) Cemre Fere (Turkey) Neslihan Kılıç | (Denmark) René Mattisson (Denmark) Tilde Iversen |
| 2014 | (Denmark) Kim Bruun | (Bulgaria) Linda Zetchiri | (Denmark) Mathias Christiansen (Denmark) David Daugaard | (Turkey) Özge Bayrak (Turkey) Neslihan Yiğit | (Republic of Ireland) Sam Magee (Republic of Ireland) Chloe Magee |
| 2015 | (Germany) Fabian Roth | (England) Fontaine Chapman | (Poland) Miłosz Bochat (Poland) Paweł Pietryja | (Belgium) Steffi Annys (Belgium) Flore Vandenhoucke | (Russia) Ilya Zhdanov (Russia) Tatjana Bibik |
| 2016 | (Bulgaria) Ivan Rusev | (Bulgaria) Mariya Mitsova | (Bulgaria) Daniel Nikolov (Bulgaria) Ivan Rusev | (Bulgaria) Mariya Mitsova (Bulgaria) Petya Nedelcheva | (Bulgaria) Lilian Mihaylov (Bulgaria) Petya Nedelcheva |
| 2017 | (Denmark) Kim Bruun | (Turkey) Aliye Demirbağ | (Bulgaria) Daniel Nikolov (Bulgaria) Ivan Rusev | (Russia) Ekaterina Kut (Russia) Daria Serebriakova | (Turkey) Osman Uyhan (Turkey) Aliye Demirbağ |
| 2018 | (France) Toma Junior Popov | (Thailand) Porntip Buranaprasertsuk | (Bulgaria) Daniel Nikolov (Bulgaria) Ivan Rusev | (Thailand) Porntip Buranaprasertsuk (Belarus) Kristina Silich | (Bulgaria) Dimitar Yanakiev (Bulgaria) Mariya Mitsova |
| 2019 | (Germany) Lars Schänzler | (Bulgaria) Mariya Mitsova | (Poland) Miłosz Bochat (Poland) Paweł Śmiłowski | (Turkey) Zehra Erdem (Turkey) İlayda Nur Özelgül | (Bulgaria) Alex Vlaar (Bulgaria) Mariya Mitsova |
| 2020 | No competition | | | | |
| 2021 | (Malaysia) Lee Shun Yang | (England) Abigail Holden | (Malaysia) Junaidi Arif (Malaysia) Muhammad Haikal | (Malaysia) Low Yeen Yuan (Malaysia) Valeree Siow | (Malaysia) Yap Roy King (Malaysia) Valeree Siow |
| 2022– 2025 | No competition | | | | |
| 2026 | (England) Ethan Rose | (India) Durga Esha Kandrapu | (Lithuania) Danielius Beržanskis (Lithuania) Domas Paksys | (Denmark) Emma Jonassen (Denmark) Marie Viscovich | (Republic of Ireland) Scott Guildea (Republic of Ireland) Rachael Darragh |

== Performances by nation ==
As of the 2026 edition

| No | Nation | MS | WS | MD | WD | XD | Total |
|---|---|---|---|---|---|---|---|
| 1 | Bulgaria | 4 | 8 | 8 | 4 | 7 | 31 |
| 2 | Denmark | 3 | | 1 | 2 | 2 | 8 |
| 3 | England | 1 | 2 | 1 | 1 | 1 | 6 |
| 3 | Malaysia | 2 | | 2 | 1 | 1 | 6 |
| 5 | Germany | 4 | 1 | | 0.5 | | 5.5 |
| 6 | Turkey | | 1 | | 3 | 1 | 5 |
| 7 | Chinese Taipei | 1 | 1 | 1 | | 1 | 4 |
| 8 | Russia | | | 1 | 1 | 1 | 3 |
| 9 | Greece* | 1 | | | 1 | | 2 |
| 9 | Ireland | | | | | 2 | 2 |
| 9 | Italy | | 1 | | | 1 | 2 |
| 9 | Poland | | | 2 | | | 2 |
| 9 | Romania | | 1 | | 1 | | 2 |
| 14 | Thailand | | 1 | | 0.5 | | 1.5 |
| 15 | Belgium | | | | 1 | | 1 |
| 15 | France | 1 | | | | | 1 |
| 15 | India | | 1 | | | | 1 |
| 15 | Lithuania | | | 1 | | | 1 |
| 19 | Belarus | | | | 0.5 | | 0.5 |
| 19 | Indonesia | | | | 0.5 | | 0.5 |
| Total | | 17 | 17 | 17 | 17 | 17 | 85 |

* Host nation
