= Petya Nedelcheva =

Bulgarian badminton player (born 1983)

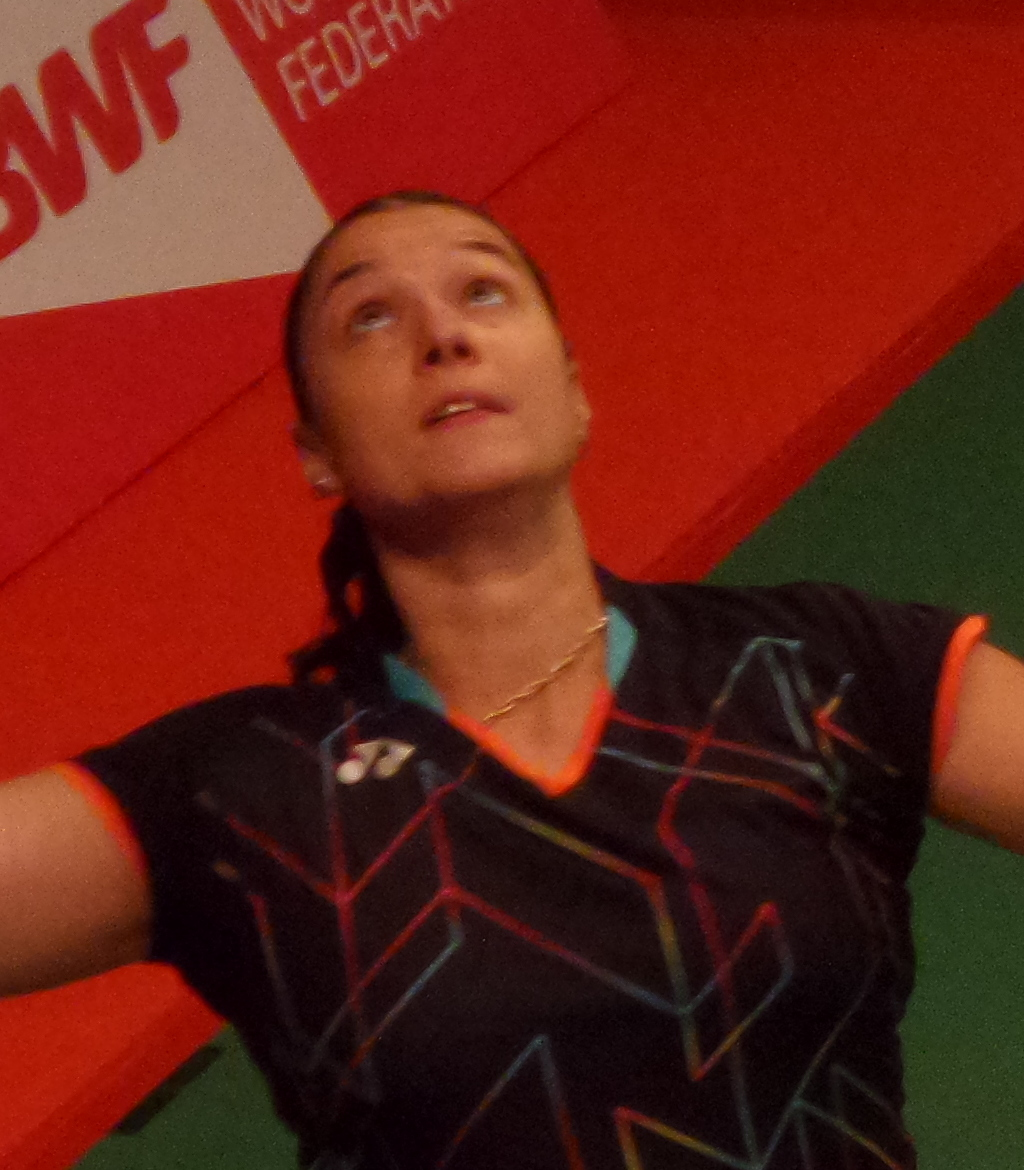
- Nedelcheva at the 2015 BWF World Championships

Personal information
- Born: 30 July 1983 (age 43) Stara Zagora, Bulgaria
- Height: 1.74 m (5 ft 9 in)
- Weight: 76 kg (168 lb)

Sport
- Country: Bulgaria
- Sport: Badminton
- Handedness: Right
- Coached by: Orlin Tsvetanov
- Retired: 2018

Women's singles & doubles
- Highest ranking: 8 (WS 23 August 2007); 3 (WD 2 December 2010)
- BWF profile
Medal record
Women's badminton
Representing Bulgaria
European Championships
Silver medal – second place	2010 Manchester	Women's doubles
Bronze medal – third place	2014 Kazan	Women's doubles
European Women's Team Championships
Silver medal – second place	2016 Kazan	Women's team
Bronze medal – third place	2014 Basel	Women's team
European Games
Bronze medal – third place	2015 Baku	Women's singles
European Junior Championships
Bronze medal – third place	2001 Spała	Girls' singles
Bronze medal – third place	2001 Spała	Girls' doubles

Petya Nedelcheva (Bulgarian: Петя Неделчева; born 30 July 1983) is a Bulgarian badminton player. She was born in Stara Zagora, Bulgaria. At the Bulgarian National Badminton Championships she won more than 20 titles.

== Career ==
A right-handed Nedelcheva became a professional badminton player since 1999, when she competed at the Balkan Games Championships. In 2001, she won bronze medals at the European Junior Badminton Championships in the girls' singles and doubles event. She also won the silver medal at the 2010 European Badminton Championships in the women's doubles event partnered with Anastasia Russkikh of Russia. At the 2014 European Badminton Championships she won bronze partnered with Imogen Bankier from Scotland. In 2015, she settled for bronze at the Baku 2015 European Games in the women's singles event.

=== Olympic Games ===
Nedelcheva competed at the 2004 Athens, 2008 Beijing, and 2012 London Summer Olympics. In 2004, she plays in the women's singles and beat Tine Rasmussen of Denmark and Seo Yoon-hee of Korea in the first two rounds. In the quarterfinals, Nedelcheva lost to Zhou Mi of China 11–4, 11–1. Nedelcheva's partner in women's doubles was Neli Boteva. They were defeated by Ella Tripp and Joanne Wright of Great Britain in the round of 32. In 2008, she reached the third round in the women's singles event after defeat Sara Persson of Sweden and Hadia Hosny of Egypt in the first two rounds. In the third round, she lost to Wong Mew Choo of Malaysia in two sets. In 2012, she did not advance to the knock-out stage after placing 2nd in the group stage. She started off with a victory over Alesia Zaitsava from Belarus, but lost to Adriyanti Firdasari from Indonesia.

== Achievements ==
=== European Games ===
Women's singles
Year	Venue	Opponent	Score	Result
2015	Baku Sports Hall, Baku, Azerbaijan	(Denmark) Line Kjærsfeldt	18–21, 14–21	Bronze

=== European Championships ===
Women's doubles
Year	Venue	Partner	Opponent	Score	Result
2010	Manchester Evening News Arena; Manchester, England	(Russia) Anastasia Russkikh	(Russia) Valeria Sorokina (Russia) Nina Vislova	18–21, 14–21	Silver
2014	Gymnastics Center; Kazan, Russia	(Scotland) Imogen Bankier	(Denmark) Christinna Pedersen (Denmark) Kamilla Rytter Juhl	21–12, 13–21, 7–21	Bronze

=== European Junior Championships ===
Girls' singles
Year	Venue	Opponent	Score	Result
2001	Spała Olympic Center, Spała, Poland	(Germany) Juliane Schenk	4–11, 5–11	Bronze

Girls' doubles
Year	Venue	Partner	Opponent	Score	Result
2001	Spała Olympic Center, Spała, Poland	(Bulgaria) Maya Ivanova	(Germany) Carina Mette (Germany) Juliane Schenk	15–9, 9–15, 7–15	Bronze

=== BWF Superseries ===
The BWF Superseries, which was launched on 14 December 2006 and implemented in 2007, was a series of elite badminton tournaments, sanctioned by the Badminton World Federation (BWF). BWF Superseries levels were Superseries and Superseries Premier. A season of Superseries consisted of twelve tournaments around the world that had been introduced since 2011. Successful players were invited to the Superseries Finals, which were held at the end of each year.

Women's doubles
Year	Tournament	Partner	Opponent	Score	Result
2010	French Open	(Russia) Anastasia Russkikh	(Thailand) Duanganong Aroonkesorn (Thailand) Kunchala Voravichitchaikul	16–21, 2–11^{r}	(silver) Runner-up

BWF Super Series Finals tournament
BWF Super Series Premier tournament
BWF Super Series tournament

=== BWF Grand Prix ===
The BWF Grand Prix had two levels, the Grand Prix and Grand Prix Gold. It was a series of badminton tournaments sanctioned by the Badminton World Federation (BWF) and played between 2007 and 2017. The World Badminton Grand Prix was sanctioned by the International Badminton Federation from 1983 to 2006.

Women's singles
Year	Tournament	Opponent	Score	Result
2006	Bulgaria Open	(Russia) Ella Karachkova	19–21, 21–19, 21–16	(gold) Winner
2008	Bulgaria Open	(Indonesia) Rosaria Yusfin Pungkasari	21–14, 21–12	(gold) Winner

Women's doubles
Year	Tournament	Partner	Opponent	Score	Result
2008	Russian Open	(Bulgaria) Dimitria Popstoykova	(Russia) Valeria Sorokina (Russia) Nina Vislova	18–21, 8–21	(silver) Runner-up

BWF Grand Prix Gold tournament
BWF Grand Prix tournament

=== BWF International Challenge/Series (62 titles, 34 runners-up) ===
Women's singles
Year	Tournament	Opponent	Score	Result
1999	Cyprus International	(Cyprus) Diana Knekna	11–0, 11–4	(gold) Winner
2000	Greece Athens International	(Bulgaria) Dobrinka Smilianova	11–4, 11–4	(gold) Winner
2000	Romanian International	(Netherlands) Lonneke Janssen	11–13, 11–7, 6–11	(silver) Runner-up
2001	Hungarian International	(Slovenia) Maja Pohar	7–1, 5–7, 7–5	(gold) Winner
2001	Bulgarian International	(England) Rebecca Pantaney	7–5, 2–7, 7–5	(gold) Winner
2001	Slovenian International	(Slovenia) Maja Pohar	7–2, 0–7, 6–8	(silver) Runner-up
2002	Athens International	(Bulgaria) Neli Boteva	11–4, 11–3	(gold) Winner
2002	Slovenian International	(Finland) Anu Weckström	6–11, 11–1, 11–9	(gold) Winner
2002	Croatian International	(Japan) Tomomi Matsuda	7–5, 7–1, 5–7	(gold) Winner
2002	Iceland International	(Scotland) Susan Hughes	11–3, 11–3	(gold) Winner
2002	Norwegian International	(Denmark) Tine Rasmussen	11–3, 12–13, 8–11	(silver) Runner-up
2002	Finnish International	(Finland) Anu Weckström	1–7, 4–7, 0–7	(silver) Runner-up
2002	Bulgarian International	(Russia) Elena Sukhareva	11–7, 8–11, 0–11	(silver) Runner-up
2003	Slovak International	(Japan) Kaori Mori	6–11, 6–11	(silver) Runner-up
2003	Finnish Open	(Germany) Huaiwen Xu	6–11, 11–8, 5–11	(silver) Runner-up
2003	Austrian Open	(Germany) Huaiwen Xu	7–11, 1–11	(silver) Runner-up
2003	Iceland International	(Japan) Miyo Akao	11–5, 13–10	(gold) Winner
2003	Bulgarian International	(Scotland) Susan Hughes	11–0, 11–0	(gold) Winner
2003	Norwegian International	(Denmark) Tine Rasmussen	7–11, 5–11	(silver) Runner-up
2004	Irish International	(England) Elizabeth Cann	8–11, 11–8, 11–9	(gold) Winner
2004	Welsh International	(Scotland) Susan Hughes	11–9, 11–8	(gold) Winner
2004	Hungarian International	(Slovenia) Maja Tvrdy	11–1, 11–6	(gold) Winner
2005	Slovak International	(Poland) Kamila Augustyn	11–2, 11–9	(gold) Winner
2005	Polish International	(Russia) Ella Karachkova	11–9, 11–7	(gold) Winner
2005	Bulgarian International	(Switzerland) Jeanine Cicognini	11–7, 11–2	(gold) Winner
2005	Dutch International	(Netherlands) Karina de Wit	11–3, 11–5	(gold) Winner
2005	Hungarian International	(Indonesia) Atu Rosalina	6–11, 6–11	(silver) Runner-up
2006	Croatian International	(Estonia) Kati Tolmoff	21–14, 21–18	(gold) Winner
2006	Banu Sport International	(Austria) Simone Prutsch	21–12, 21–11	(gold) Winner
2006	Scotland International	(Russia) Ella Karachkova	18–21, 21–7, 18–21	(silver) Runner-up
2007	Turkey International	(Germany) Juliane Schenk	21–14, 12–21 retired	(silver) Runner-up
2007	Bulgarian International	(Canada) Anna Rice	21–19, 21–16	(gold) Winner
2007	Hellas International	(Iceland) Ragna Ingólfsdóttir	Walkover	(gold) Winner
2008	Polish International	(Germany) Juliane Schenk	16–21, 7–21	(silver) Runner-up
2008	Bulgarian International	(Scotland) Susan Hughes	21–11, 21–15	(gold) Winner
2008	Hungarian International	(Slovenia) Maja Tvrdy	21–11, 21–8	(gold) Winner
2009	Austrian International	(Germany) Juliane Schenk	22–20, 8–21, 20–22	(silver) Runner-up
2009	Banuinvest International	(Bulgaria) Linda Zetchiri	21–9, 21–17	(gold) Winner
2009	Polish International	(Poland) Linling Wang	15–21, 14–21	(silver) Runner-up
2009	Dutch International	(Germany) Juliane Schenk	12–21, 16–21	(silver) Runner-up
2009	Bulgarian International	(Bulgaria) Linda Zetchiri	21–4, 19–8 retired	(gold) Winner
2010	Austrian International	(Indonesia) Fransisca Ratnasari	15–21, 21–18, 14–21	(silver) Runner-up
2010	Bulgarian International	(Republic of Ireland) Chloe Magee	21–17, 21–13	(gold) Winner
2011	Turkey International	(Greece) Anne Hald Jensen	Walkover	(gold) Winner
2011	Italian International	(Netherlands) Yao Jie	11–21, 17–21	(silver) Runner-up
2012	Bulgarian International	(Bulgaria) Stefani Stoeva	21–9, 21–18	(gold) Winner
2012	Welsh International	(Chinese Taipei) Chiang Mei-hui	21–19, 19–21, 17–21	(silver) Runner-up
2013	Austrian International	(Japan) Yui Hashimoto	11–21, 3–21	(silver) Runner-up
2013	Bulgarian International	(Spain) Beatriz Corrales	19–21, 14–21	(silver) Runner-up
2014	White Nights	(Bulgaria) Stefani Stoeva	21–14, 21–17	(gold) Winner
2014	Bulgarian Eurasia Open	(Turkey) Özge Bayrak	11–8, 11–6, 11–7	(gold) Winner

Women's doubles
Year	Tournament	Partner	Opponent	Score	Result
1999	Romanian International	(Bulgaria) Raina Tzvetkova	(Bulgaria) Neli Boteva (Bulgaria) Diana Koleva	15–12, 12–15, 3–15	(silver) Runner-up
2000	Greece Athens International	(Bulgaria) Diana Koleva	(Bulgaria) Maya Ivanova (Bulgaria) Dobrinka Smilianova	15–7, 15–7	(gold) Winner
2002	Athens International	(Bulgaria) Neli Boteva	(Cyprus) Maria Ioannou (Cyprus) Diana Knekna	11–3, 11–1	(gold) Winner
2003	Bulgarian International	(Bulgaria) Neli Boteva	(Bulgaria) Diana Dimova (Bulgaria) Maya Ivanova	15–10, 15–2	(gold) Winner
2003	Iceland International	(Bulgaria) Neli Boteva	(Denmark) Line Isberg (Denmark) Karina Sørensen	7–15, 15–9, 15–10	(gold) Winner
2004	Austrian International	(Bulgaria) Neli Boteva	(England) Liza Parker (England) Suzanne Rayappan	15–9, 15–14	(gold) Winner
2004	Finnish International	(Bulgaria) Neli Boteva	(Switzerland) Judith Baumeyer (Switzerland) Fabienne Baumeyer	15–11, 15–7	(gold) Winner
2004	Dutch International	(Bulgaria) Neli Boteva	(Denmark) Lena Frier Kristiansen (Denmark) Kamilla Rytter Juhl	15–10, 15–6	(gold) Winner
2004	Welsh International	(Scotland) Yuan Wemyss	(England) Katie Litherland (England) Julie Pike	17–14, 15–0	(gold) Winner
2004	Le Volant d'Or de Toulouse	(Russia) Anastasia Russkikh	(India) Jwala Gutta (India) Shruti Kurien	15–11, 15–6	(gold) Winner
2005	Bulgarian International	(Bulgaria) Diana Dimova	(Switzerland) Sabrina Jaquet (Switzerland) Corinne Jörg	15–1, 15–11	(gold) Winner
2005	Portugal International	(Scotland) Yuan Wemyss	(Germany) Sandra Marinello (Germany) Kathrin Piotrowski	15–8, 11–15, 2–15	(silver) Runner-up
2006	Banu Sport International	(Bulgaria) Diana Dimova	(Slovenia) Maja Kersnik (Slovenia) Maja Tvrdy	21–13, 21–11	(gold) Winner
2006	Bulgarian International	(Bulgaria) Diana Dimova	(Russia) Elena Chernyavskaya (Russia) Anastasia Prokopenko	21–18, 21–13	(gold) Winner
2007	Turkey International	(Bulgaria) Diana Dimova	(Germany) Nicole Grether (Germany) Juliane Schenk	Walkover	(silver) Runner-up
2007	Hellas International	(Bulgaria) Diana Dimova	(Denmark) Maria Helsbøl (Denmark) Anne Skelbæk	21–14, 21–15	(gold) Winner
2008	Hungarian International	(Bulgaria) Dimitria Popstoikova	(Russia) Olga Golovanova (Russia) Anastasia Prokopenko	12–21, 21–10, 12–21	(silver) Runner-up
2009	Banuinvest International	(Bulgaria) Dimitria Popstoikova	(Romania) Alexandra Milon (Romania) Florentina Petre	21–17, 21–14	(gold) Winner
2009	Polish International	(Bulgaria) Diana Dimova	(Netherlands) Rachel van Cutsen (Netherlands) Paulien van Dooremalen	21–18, 14–21, 21–16	(gold) Winner
2009	Bulgarian International	(Russia) Anastasia Russkikh	(Germany) Nicole Grether (Canada) Charmaine Reid	21–11, 21–18	(gold) Winner
2010	White Nights	(Russia) Anastasia Russkikh	(Russia) Valeria Sorokina (Russia) Nina Vislova	21–17, 21–15	(silver) Runner-up
2010	Bulgarian International	(Russia) Anastasia Russkikh	(Russia) Tatjana Bibik (Russia) Olga Golovanova	Walkover	(gold) Winner
2013	Finnish Open	(Scotland) Imogen Bankier	(Denmark) Lena Grebak (Denmark) Maria Helsbøl	21–10, 21–14	(gold) Winner
2013	Dutch International	(Scotland) Imogen Bankier	(Japan) Rie Eto (Japan) Yu Wakita	14–21, 21–18, 12–21	(silver) Runner-up
2013	Bulgaria Eurasia Open	(Bulgaria) Dimitria Popstoikova	(Bulgaria) Gabriela Stoeva (Bulgaria) Stefani Stoeva	21–11, 21–8	(gold) Winner
2013	Kharkiv International	(Scotland) Imogen Bankier	(Denmark) Lena Grebak (Denmark) Maria Helsbøl	21–11, 21–12	(gold) Winner
2013	Belgian International	(Scotland) Imogen Bankier	(Bulgaria) Gabriela Stoeva (Bulgaria) Stefani Stoeva	13–21, 21–11, 21–18	(gold) Winner
2013	Czech International	(Scotland) Imogen Bankier	(Scotland) Jillie Cooper (Scotland) Kirsty Gilmour	21–6, 21–14	(gold) Winner
2014	Orléans International	(Scotland) Imogen Bankier	(Bulgaria) Gabriela Stoeva (Bulgaria) Stefani Stoeva	21–14, 21–7	(gold) Winner
2014	Bulgarian Eurasia Open	(Bulgaria) Dimitria Popstoikova	(Turkey) Özge Bayrak (Turkey) Neslihan Yiğit	5–11, 5–11, 11–8, 11–10, 7–11	(silver) Runner-up
2016	Hellas International	(Bulgaria) Mariya Mitsova	(Germany) Annabella Jäger (Germany) Vanessa Seele	21–11, 21–9	(gold) Winner
2016	Bulgarian International	(Bulgaria) Mariya Mitsova	(Turkey) Cemre Fere (Turkey) Neslihan Kılıç	15–21, 19–21	(silver) Runner-up
2016	Slovak Open	(Bulgaria) Mariya Mitsova	(Ukraine) Vladyslava Lesnaya (Ukraine) Darya Samarchants	11–5, 11–4, 11–3	(gold) Winner
2016	Prague International	(Bulgaria) Mariya Mitsova	(England) Lauren Smith (England) Sarah Walker	12–21, 18–21	(silver) Runner-up
2016	Hungarian International	(Bulgaria) Mariya Mitsova	(Denmark) Gabriella Bøje (Denmark) Cecilie Sentow	11–6, 11–6, 11–5	(gold) Winner
2016	Italian International	(Bulgaria) Mariya Mitsova	(Russia) Anastasia Chervyakova (Russia) Olga Morozova	18–21, 17–21	(silver) Runner-up
2017	Estonian International	(Bulgaria) Mariya Mitsova	(France) Delphine Delrue (France) Léa Palermo	21–12, 21–16	(gold) Winner

Mixed doubles
Year	Tournament	Partner	Opponent	Score	Result
1999	Cyprus International	(Bulgaria) Georgi Petrov	(Denmark) Peter Jensen (Denmark) Nina Messman	12–15, 3–15	(silver) Runner-up
2000	Greece Athens International	(Bulgaria) Slantchezar Tzankov	(Bulgaria) Ljuben Panov (Bulgaria) Diana Dimova	15–9, 15–10	(gold) Winner
2002	Finish International	(Bulgaria) Konstantin Dobrev	(Russia) Sergey Ivlev (Russia) Elena Shimko	3–7, 6–8, 7–0, 8–7, 7–4	(gold) Winner
2002	Athens International	(Bulgaria) Konstantin Dobrev	(Bulgaria) Boris Kessov (Bulgaria) Neli Boteva	3–11, 11–1, 11–6	(gold) Winner
2002	Bulgarian International	(Bulgaria) Konstantin Dobrev	(Russia) Nikolai Zuyev (Russia) Marina Yakusheva	11–4, 9–11, 7–11	(silver) Runner-up
2005	Bulgarian International	(Bulgaria) Vladimir Metodiev	(Bulgaria) Julian Hristov (Bulgaria) Diana Dimova	15–2, 15–6	(gold) Winner
2006	Banu Sport International	(Bulgaria) Vladimir Metodiev	(Bulgaria) Stiliyan Makarski (Bulgaria) Diana Dimova	16–21, 21–16, 11–21	(silver) Runner-up
2016	Hellas International	(Bulgaria) Lilian Mihaylov	(Poland) Maciej Oceipa (Poland) Karolina Gajos	21–18, 21–16	(gold) Winner

BWF International Challenge tournament
BWF International Series tournament
BWF Future Series tournament

== Record against selected opponents ==
Includes results against Olympic quarterfinals, Worlds semifinalists, and Super Series finalists, plus all Olympic opponents.

- (Australia) Huang Chia-chi 1–1
- (Belarus) Alesia Zaitsava 1–0
- (China) Jiang Yanjiao 1–5
- (China) Li Xuerui 0–1
- (China) Liu Xin 0–1
- (China) Lu Lan 0–2
- (China) Wang Lin 0–1
- (China) Wang Shixian 0–2
- (China) Wang Xin 0–3
- (China) Wang Yihan 0–5
- (China) Xie Xingfang 0–3
- (China) Zhang Ning 0–4
- (China) Zhou Mi 0–4
- (China) Zhu Lin 0–2
- (Chinese Taipei) Cheng Shao-chieh 0–1
- (England) Tracey Hallam 2–2
- (Denmark) Tine Baun 3–6
- (Egypt) Hadia Hosny 1–0
- (France) Pi Hongyan 3–8
- (Germany) Juliane Schenk 2–9
- (Germany) Xu Huaiwen 0–9
- (Hong Kong) Wang Chen 0–5
- (Hong Kong) Yip Pui Yin 1–2
- (India) Saina Nehwal 2–6
- (Indonesia) Adriyanti Firdasari 0–1
- (Indonesia) Maria Kristin Yulianti 2–0
- (Japan) Eriko Hirose 1–6
- (Japan) Minatsu Mitani 0–1
- (Japan) Sayaka Sato 2–4
- (Japan) Shizuka Uchida 1–0
- (South Korea) Bae Youn-joo 0–1
- (South Korea) Seo Yoon-hee 1–1
- (South Korea) Sung Ji-hyun 1–2
- (Netherlands) Mia Audina 0–1
- (Malaysia) Wong Mew Choo 0–1
- (Spain) Carolina Marín 0–1
- (Sweden) Sara Persson 3–3
- (Thailand) Porntip Buranaprasertsuk 0–1
