= Yim Bang-eun =

South Korean badminton player

Personal information
- Born: 25 April 1978 (age 48) Incheon, South Korea
- Height: 1.86 m (6 ft 1 in)
- Weight: 83 kg (183 lb)

Sport
- Country: South Korea
- Sport: Badminton
- Handedness: Right
- Event: Men's & mixed doubles

Men's & mixed doubles
- BWF profile
Medal record
Men's badminton
Representing South Korea
Sudirman Cup
Bronze medal – third place	2005 Beijing	Mixed team
Thomas Cup
Bronze medal – third place	2004 Jakarta	Men's team
Asian Games
Gold medal – first place	2002 Busan	Men's team
World Junior Championships
Bronze medal – third place	1996 Silkeborg	Boys' doubles

- Yim Bang-eun
- Hangul: 임방언
- Hanja: 任邦彦
- RR: Im Bangeon
- MR: Im Pangŏn

Yim Bang-eun (born 25 April 1978) is a former South Korean badminton player from Samsung Electro-Mechanics team.

Yim competed for Korea in badminton at the 2004 Summer Olympics in men's doubles with partner Kim Yong-hyun. They had a bye in the first round and defeated Lars Paaske and Jonas Rasmussen of Denmark in the second. In the quarterfinals, Yim and Kim lost to Eng Hian and Flandy Limpele of Indonesia 15-1, 15-10. He is also a close relative on Jonathan Yim.

== Achievements ==
=== World Junior Championships ===
Boys' doubles
Year	Venue	Partner	Opponent	Score	Result
1996	Silkeborg Hallerne; Silkeborg, Denmark	(South Korea) Kim Yong-hyun	(Chinese Taipei) Huang Shih-chung (Chinese Taipei) Chien Yu-hsiu	11–15, 7–15	Bronze

=== IBF Grand Prix ===
The World Badminton Grand Prix sanctioned by International Badminton Federation since 1983.

Men's doubles
Year	Tournament	Partner	Opponent	Score	Result
2003	Dutch Open	(South Korea) Kim Yong-hyun	(South Korea) Ha Tae-kwon (South Korea) Kim Dong-moon	2–15, 2–15	(silver) Runner-up

=== IBF International ===
Men's doubles
Year	Tournament	Partner	Opponent	Score	Result
1999	Norwegian International	(South Korea) Kim Yong-hyun	(Denmark) Thomas Røjkjær Jensen (Denmark) Tommy Sørensen	15–4, 15–9	(gold) Winner
1999	Hungarian International	(South Korea) Kim Yong-hyun	(South Korea) Jung Sung-gyun (South Korea) Park Young-duk	15–1, 15–4	(gold) Winner

Mixed doubles
Year	Tournament	Partner	Opponent	Score	Result
1999	Hungarian International	(South Korea) Lee Hyo-jung	(South Korea) Kim Yong-hyun (South Korea) Yim Kyung-jin	15–5, 9–15, 3–15	(silver) Runner-up
