= Georgi Petrov (badminton) =

Bulgarian badminton player (born 1980)

Personal information
- Born: 19 July 1980 (age 46)
- Height: 1.75 m (5 ft 9 in)

Sport
- Country: Bulgaria
- Sport: Badminton
- Handedness: Right
- Event: Doubles

Doubles
- BWF profile

Georgi Petrov (Bulgarian: Георги Петров; born 19 July 1980) is a Bulgarian badminton player. Petrov is a 5-time national champion. He has won several tournaments in Cyprus, Greece and Israel. In 2003 and 2007, he took part in the Badminton World Championships.

== Achievements ==
=== IBF/BWF International ===
Men's singles
Year	Tournament	Opponent	Score	Result
2002	Athens International	(Bulgaria) Julian Hristov	13–15, 15–6, 15–3	(gold) Winner
2002	Cyprus International	(Bulgaria) Teodor Velkov	15–7, 15–3	(gold) Winner
2006	Hellas International	(Croatia) Rihtar Neven		(gold) Winner

Men's doubles
Year	Tournament	Partner	Opponent	Score	Result
1999	Israel International	(Bulgaria) Boris Kessov	(Israel) Leon Pougatch (Israel) Nir Yusim	15–4, 15–4	(gold) Winner
2001	Hungarian International	(Bulgaria) Konstantin Dobrev	(Sweden) Joakim Andersson (Sweden) Johan Holm	7–8, 3–7, 5–7	(silver) Runner-up
2001	Athens International	(Bulgaria) Julian Hristov	(Greece) George Patis (Bulgaria) Teodor Velkov	7–0, 7–5, 7–3	(gold) Winner
2002	Athens International	(Bulgaria) Konstantin Dobrev	(Moldova) Egor Ursatii (Moldova) Maxim Carpenco	15–5, 15–13	(gold) Winner
2002	Cyprus International	(Bulgaria) Julian Hristov	(Israel) Alexander Bass (Israel) Nir Yusim	15–2, 15–3	(gold) Winner
2003	Athens International	(Bulgaria) Konstantin Dobrev	(France) Erwin Kehlhoffner (France) Thomas Quére	15–10, 15–6	(gold) Winner
2003	Slovak International	(Bulgaria) Konstantin Dobrev	(France) Svetoslav Stoyanov (France) Vincent Laigle	2–15, 2–15	(silver) Runner-up
2006	Banuinvest International	(Bulgaria) Blagovest Kisiov	(Bulgaria) Stiliyan Makarski (Bulgaria) Vladimir Metodiev	20–22, 19–21	(silver) Runner-up
2006	Hungarian International	(Bulgaria) Blagovest Kisiov	(Sweden) Imam Sodikin (Sweden) Imanuel Hirschfeldt	18–21, 9–21	(silver) Runner-up
2006	Hellas International	(Bulgaria) Blagovest Kisiov	(Canada) Kyle Holoboff (Canada) Richard Liang		(gold) Winner

Mixed doubles
Year	Tournament	Partner	Opponent	Score	Result
1999	Cyprus International	(Bulgaria) Petya Nedelcheva	(Denmark) Peter Jensen (Denmark) Nina Messman	12–15, 3–15	(silver) Runner-up

BWF International Challenge tournament
BWF International Series tournament
BWF Future Series tournament
