= Theodoros Velkos =

Greek badminton player (born 1976)

- Velkos (bottom) at the 2004 Summer Olympics

Personal information
- Born: Todor Velkov; 20 November 1976 (age 49) Pazardzhik, Bulgaria
- Height: 1.71 m (5 ft 7 in)
- Weight: 70 kg (154 lb)

Sport
- Country: Bulgaria (1992–1999); Greece (2000–2013)
- Sport: Badminton
- Event: Men's singles & doubles

Men's singles & doubles
- BWF profile
Medal record
Men's badminton
Representing Greece
Balkan Championships
Bronze medal – third place	2005 Serres	Men's singles
Bronze medal – third place	2005 Serres	Men's doubles
Bronze medal – third place	2005 Serres	Mixed team
Bronze medal – third place	2009 Stara Zagora	Mixed team
Bronze medal – third place	2011 Polygyros	Mixed team
Representing Bulgaria
European Junior Championships
Bronze medal – third place	1995 Nitra	Boys' doubles

Theodoros Velkos (Greek: Θεόδωρος Βέλκος; born 20 November 1976) is a male badminton player from Greece.

Velkos competed in badminton at the 2004 Summer Olympics in men's doubles with partner George Patis. They were defeated in the 32nd round by Chan Chong Ming and Chew Choon Eng of Malaysia. In his home country he won 12 titles at the Greek National Badminton Championships until 2010.

He had previously competed as Todor Velkov (Bulgarian: Тодор Велков), representing Bulgaria at the 1996 Summer Olympics.

== Achievements ==
=== Balkan Championships ===
Men's singles
Year	Venue	Opponent	Score	Result
2005	Omonoia Sports Center, Serres, Greece	(Bulgaria) Georgi Petrov	8–15, 8–15	Bronze

Men's doubles
Year	Venue	Partner	Opponent	Score	Result
2005	Omonoia Sports Center; Serres, Greece	(Greece) George Patis	(Bulgaria) Krasimir Jankov (Bulgaria) Georgi Petrov	8–15, 11–15	Bronze

=== European Junior Championships ===
Boys' doubles
Year	Venue	Partner	Opponent	Score	Result
1995	Športová hala Olympia; Nitra, Slovakia	(Bulgaria) Boris Kesov	(Denmark) Jonas Rasmussen (Denmark) Søren Hansen	7–15, 15–17	Bronze

=== IBF International (3 titles, 2 runners-up) ===
Men's singles
Year	Tournament	Opponent	Score	Result
1999	Cyprus International	(Israel) Nir Yusim	15–7, 15–7	(gold) Winner

Men's doubles
Year	Tournament	Partner	Opponent	Score	Result
1999	Cyprus International	(Greece) Vasilios Velkos	(Israel) Sergei Antonyuk (Israel) Boris Kroyter	15–10, 13–15, 15–11	(gold) Winner
2001	Cyprus International	(Greece) George Patis	(Iran) Afshin Bozorgzadeh (Iran) Ali Shahhosseini	6–7, 5–7, 0–7	(silver) Runner-up
2001	Greece International	(Greece) George Patis	(Bulgaria) Julian Hristov (Bulgaria) Georgi Petrov	0–7, 5–7, 3–7	(silver) Runner-up
2004	Estonian International	(Greece) George Patis	(Wales) Jonathan Morgan (Wales) James Phillips	15–12, 15–9	(gold) Winner
