= Diana Dimova =

Bulgarian badminton player

Personal information
- Born: 7 August 1984 (age 42)
- Height: 1.64 m (5 ft 5 in)

Sport
- Country: Bulgaria
- Sport: Badminton
- Handedness: Right

Women's singles & doubles
- Career record: WS: 48 wins, 83 losses WD: 75 wins, 61 losses XD: 120 wins, 83 losses
- Highest ranking: 28 (XD) with Stiliyan Makarski (21 January 2010)
- BWF profile

Diana Dimova (Bulgarian: Диана Димова; born 7 August 1984) is a Bulgarian badminton player. At the Bulgarian National Badminton Championships she won 13 titles in women's doubles and mixed doubles events.

== Achievements ==
=== BWF International Challenge/Series ===
Women's singles
Year	Tournament	Opponent	Score	Result
2001	Athens International	(Cyprus) Maria Ioannou	7–4, 7–5, 0–7	(gold) Winner
2003	Athens International	(Romania) Florentina Petre	3–11, 6–11	(silver) Runner-up

Women's doubles
Year	Tournament	Partner	Opponent	Score	Result
2000	Cyprus International	(Bulgaria) Dobrinka Smilanova	(Hungary) Krisztina Ádám (Hungary) Zita Batár	15–12, 15–8	(gold) Winner
2002	Cyprus International	(Bulgaria) Atanaska Spasova	(Cyprus) Maria Ioannou (Cyprus) Diana Knekna	1–11, 1–11	(silver) Runner-up
2004	Bulgarian International	(Bulgaria) Linda Zetchiri	(Iceland) Ragna Ingólfsdóttir (Iceland) Sara Jónsdóttir	13–15, 11–15	(silver) Runner-up
2005	Bulgarian International	(Bulgaria) Petya Nedelcheva	(Switzerland) Sabrina Jaquet (Switzerland) Corinne Jörg	15–1, 15–11	(gold) Winner
2006	Banu Sport International	(Bulgaria) Petya Nedelcheva	(Slovenia) Maja Kersnik (Slovenia) Maja Tvrdy	21–13, 21–11	(gold) Winner
2006	Bulgarian International	(Bulgaria) Petya Nedelcheva	(Russia) Elena Chernyavskaya (Russia) Anastasia Prokopenko	21–18, 21–13	(gold) Winner
2007	Hellas International	(Bulgaria) Petya Nedelcheva	(Denmark) Maria Helsbøl (Denmark) Anne Skelbæk	21–14, 21–15	(gold) Winner
2007	Turkey International	(Bulgaria) Petya Nedelcheva	(Germany) Nicole Grether (Germany) Juliane Schenk	Walkover	(silver) Runner-up
2009	Polish International	(Bulgaria) Petya Nedelcheva	(Netherlands) Rachel van Cutsen (Netherlands) Paulien van Dooremalen	21–18, 14–21, 21–16	(gold) Winner

Mixed doubles
Year	Tournament	Partner	Opponent	Score	Result
2000	Greece Athens International	(Bulgaria) Ljuben Panov	(Bulgaria) Slantchezar Tzankov (Bulgaria) Petya Nedelcheva	15–9, 15–10	(silver) Runner-up
2001	Athens International	(Bulgaria) Julian Hristov	(Cyprus) Antonis C. Lazarou (Cyprus) Maria Ioannou	7–5, 7–0, 7–1	(gold) Winner
2002	Cyprus International	(Bulgaria) Julian Hristov	(Cyprus) Nicolas Pissis (Poland) Katarzyna Krasowska	11–4, 11–9	(gold) Winner
2003	Athens International	(Bulgaria) Julian Hristov	(Bulgaria) Konstantin Dobrev (Bulgaria) Linda Zetchiri	15–6, 15–12	(gold) Winner
2005	Bulgarian International	(Bulgaria) Julian Hristov	(Bulgaria) Vladimir Metodiev (Bulgaria) Petya Nedelcheva	2–15, 6–15	(silver) Runner-up
2006	Banu Sport International	(Bulgaria) Stiliyan Makarski	(Bulgaria) Vladimir Metodiev (Bulgaria) Petya Nedelcheva	21–16, 16–21, 21–11	(gold) Winner
2008	Banuinvest International	(Bulgaria) Stiliyan Makarski	(Poland) Łukasz Moreń (Poland) Malgorzata Kurdelska	21–15, 10–21, 21–18	(gold) Winner
2010	Austrian International	(Bulgaria) Stiliyan Makarski	(Ukraine) Valeriy Atrashchenkov (Ukraine) Elena Prus	26–24, 17–21, 17–21	(silver) Runner-up
2019	Bulgarian International	(Bulgaria) Stiliyan Makarski	(Finland) Julius von Pfaler (Finland) Jenny Nyström	17–21, 21–13, 21–17	(gold) Winner

BWF International Challenge tournament
BWF International Series tournament
BWF Future Series tournament
