= Romanian International =

Badminton tournament

The Romanian International, also known as BanuInvest International Championships, is an international badminton open held in Romania since 1991. It was halted in 1994, 1996, 1997, and between 2001 and 2005. The tournament belongs to the EBU Circuit.

== Previous winners ==
Year	Men's singles	Women's singles	Men's doubles	Women's doubles	Mixed doubles	Ref
1991	(Hungary) Tamas Gebhard	(Hungary) Andrea Harsági	(Hungary) Tamas Gebhard (Hungary) Richard Banhidi	(Hungary) Andrea Dakó (Hungary) Andrea Harsági	(Bulgaria) Jeliazko Valkov (Bulgaria) Diana Filipova	
1992	(Bulgaria) Iasen Borisov	(Bulgaria) Reni Asenova	(Bulgaria) Michail Popov (Bulgaria) Svetoslav Stoyanov	(Bulgaria) Reni Asenova (Bulgaria) Raina Tzvetkova	(Romania) Emerik Balazs (Romania) Erika Stich	
1993	(Bulgaria) Anatoliy Skripko	(Ukraine) Elena Nozdran	(Ukraine) Vladislav Druzchenko (Ukraine) Valeri Streltsov	(Ukraine) Elena Nozdran (Ukraine) Irina Koloskova	(Ukraine) Valeri Streltsov (Ukraine) Elena Nozdran	
1994– 1995	No competition					
1996	(Bulgaria) Mihail Popov	(Bulgaria) Victoria Hristova	(Bulgaria) Mihail Popov (Bulgaria) Liyben Panov	(Bulgaria) Victoria Hristova (Bulgaria) Raina Tzvetcova	(Bulgaria) Svetoslav Stoyanov (Bulgaria) Raina Tzvetcova	
1997	No competition					
1998	(Bulgaria) Konstantin Dobrev	(Hungary) Csilla Forian	(Bulgaria) Konstantin Dobrev (Bulgaria) Asparuch Nedkov	(Bulgaria) Diana Koleva (Bulgaria) Raina Tzvetkova	(Bulgaria) Konstantin Dobrev (Bulgaria) Diana Koleva	
1999	(Japan) Hidetaka Yamada	(Slovenia) Maja Pohar	(Austria) Harald Koch (Austria) Jürgen Koch	(Bulgaria) Diana Koleva (Bulgaria) Nely Nedjalkova	(Slovenia) Andrej Pohar (Slovenia) Maja Pohar	
2000	(Germany) Oliver Pongratz	(Netherlands) Lonneke Janssen	(Denmark) Mathias Boe (Denmark) Michael Jensen	(Denmark) Britta Andersen (Denmark) Lene Mørk	(Denmark) Mathias Boe (Denmark) Britta Andersen	
2001– 2005	No competition					
2006	(Czech Republic) Jan Vondra	(Bulgaria) Petya Nedelcheva	(Bulgaria) Vladimir Metodiev (Bulgaria) Stilian Makarski	(Bulgaria) Petya Nedelcheva (Bulgaria) Diana Dimova	(Bulgaria) Stilian Makarski (Bulgaria) Diana Dimova	
2007	(Japan) Sho Sasaki	(England) Tracey Hallam	(Japan) Kenichi Hayakawa (Japan) Kenta Kazuno	(Canada) Fiona Mckee (Canada) Charmaine Reid	(Ukraine) Valeriy Atrashchenkov (Ukraine) Elena Prus	
2008	(Finland) Ville Lång	(South Korea) Hwang Hye-youn	(Bulgaria) Vladimir Metodiev (Bulgaria) Krasimir Yankov	(Russia) Olga Golovanova (Russia) Anastasia Prokopenko	(Bulgaria) Stilian Makarski (Bulgaria) Diana Dimova	
2009	(Indonesia) Dionysius Hayom Rumbaka	(Bulgaria) Petya Nedelcheva	(Bulgaria) Julian Hristov (Bulgaria) Vladimir Metodiev	(Bulgaria) Petya Nedelcheva (Bulgaria) Dimitria Popstoikova	(Ukraine) Valeriy Atrashchenkov (Ukraine) Elena Prus	
2010	(Malaysia) Yeoh Kay Bin	(Japan) Hitomi Oka	(Austria) Jürgen Koch (Austria) Peter Zauner	(Singapore) Shinta Mulia Sari (Singapore) Yao Lei	(Singapore) Chayut Triyachart (Singapore) Yao Lei	
2011	(Japan) Koichi Saeki	(Japan) Minatsu Mitani	(Republic of Ireland) Sam Magee (Republic of Ireland) Tony Stephenson	(Canada) Alex Bruce (Canada) Michelle Li	(Republic of Ireland) Sam Magee (Republic of Ireland) Chloe Magee	
2012	(Germany) Marcel Reuter	(Japan) Kana Ito	(France) Laurent Constantin (France) Sébastien Vincent	(Denmark) Sandra-Maria Jensen (Denmark) Line Kjærsfeldt	(Indonesia) Edi Subaktiar (Indonesia) Melati Daeva Oktavianti	
2013	(Japan) Takuto Inoue	(Spain) Beatriz Corrales	(Japan) Takuto Inoue (Japan) Yuki Kaneko	(Russia) Irina Khlebko (Russia) Ksenia Polikarpova	(South Korea) Choi Sol-gyu (South Korea) Kim Hye-rin	
2014	(Malaysia) Ramdan Misbun	(France) Delphine Lansac	(Croatia) Zvonimir Đurkinjak (Croatia) Zvonimir Hölbling	(Germany) Barbara Bellenberg (Germany) Ramona Hacks	(Scotland) Martin Campbell (Scotland) Jillie Cooper	
2015	(Indonesia) Adi Pratama	(Belgium) Lianne Tan	(Croatia) Zvonimir Đurkinjak (Croatia) Zvonimir Hölbling	(England) Chloe Birch (England) Jenny Wallwork	(India) Tarun Kona (India) N. Sikki Reddy	
2016	(Thailand) Pannawit Thongnuam	(Malaysia) Lee Ying Ying	(Malaysia) Ong Yew Sin (Malaysia) Teo Ee Yi	(England) Jessica Pugh (Netherlands) Cheryl Seinen	(Malaysia) Wong Fai Yin (Malaysia) Lai Shevon Jemie	
2017	(Spain) Luís Enrique Peñalver	(Spain) Clara Azurmendi	(Slovenia) Andraž Krapež (Thailand) Samatcha Tovannakasem	(South Korea) Hwang Yu-mi (South Korea) Kang Chan-hee	(Germany) Lukas Resch (Germany) Miranda Wilson	
2018	No competition					
