= Konstantin Dobrev =

Bulgarian badminton player

Personal information
- Born: 16 June 1974 (age 52)
- Height: 1.82 m (6 ft 0 in)

Sport
- Country: Bulgaria
- Sport: Badminton
- Handedness: Right
- Event: Doubles

Doubles
- BWF profile

Konstantin Dobrev (Bulgarian: Константин Добрев; born 16 June 1974) is a Bulgarian badminton player from BC Academics Sofia club.

Konstantin Dobrev is one of the most important Bulgarian badminton players of the 1990s and 2000s. He took part in several world championships and won 11 titles at the National level. He was also successful at Balkans, Finland, Greece, Cyprus and in Romania at the International level.

== Achievements ==
=== IBF/BWF International ===
Men's singles
Year	Tournament	Opponent	Score	Result
2000	Cyprus International	(Bulgaria) Ljuben Panov	15–6, 15–1	(gold) Winner
1998	Cyprus International	(Israel) Nir Yusim	11–15, 15–4, 15–8	(gold) Winner
1998	Romanian International	(Romania) Florin Posteucă	4–15, 17–15, 15–2	(gold) Winner

Men's doubles
Year	Tournament	Partner	Opponent	Score	Result
2007	Banuinvest International	(Bulgaria) Julian Hristov	(Japan) Kenichi Hayakawa (Japan) Kenta Kazuno	10–21, 13–21	(silver) Runner-up
2003	Slovak International	(Bulgaria) Georgi Petrov	(France) Svetoslav Stoyanov (France) Vincent Laigle	2–15, 2–15	(silver) Runner-up
2003	Athens International	(Bulgaria) Georgi Petrov	(France) Erwin Kehlhoffner (France) Thomas Quére	15–10, 15–6	(gold) Winner
2002	Athens International	(Bulgaria) Georgi Petrov	(Moldova) Egor Ursatii (Moldova) Maxim Carpenco	15–5, 15–13	(gold) Winner
2001	Hungarian International	(Bulgaria) Georgi Petrov	(Sweden) Joakim Andersson (Sweden) Johan Holm	7–8, 3–7, 5–7	(silver) Runner-up
2000	Cyprus International	(Bulgaria) Ljuben Panov	(Hungary) Levente Csiszer (Hungary) Richard Banhidi	15–4, 15–6	(gold) Winner
1998	Cyprus International	(Bulgaria) Assparunch Nedkov	(Denmark) Lars Christian Nielsen (Denmark) Peter Jensen	9–15, 12–15	(silver) Runner-up
1998	Romanian International	(Bulgaria) Assparunch Nedkov	(Romania) Daniel Cojocaru (Romania) George Constantinescu	15–9, 17–16	(gold) Winner

Mixed doubles
Year	Tournament	Partner	Opponent	Score	Result
2009	Croatian International	(Bulgaria) Maya Dobreva	(Croatia) Zvonimir Đurkinjak (Croatia) Staša Poznanović	13–21, 21–17, 9–21	(silver) Runner-up
2003	Athens International	(Bulgaria) Linda Zetchiri	(Bulgaria) Diana Dimova (Bulgaria) Julian Hristov	6–15, 12–15	(silver) Runner-up
2002	Bulgarian International	(Bulgaria) Petya Nedelcheva	(Russia) Marina Yakusheva (Russia) Nikolai Zuyev	11–4, 9–11, 7–11	(silver) Runner-up
2002	Athens International	(Bulgaria) Petya Nedelcheva	(Bulgaria) Boris Kessov (Bulgaria) Neli Boteva	3–11, 11–1, 11–6	(gold) Winner
2002	Finish International	(Bulgaria) Petya Nedelcheva	(Russia) Sergei Ivlev (Russia) Elena Shimko	3–7, 6–8, 7–0, 8–7, 7–4	(gold) Winner
2000	Cyprus International	(Bulgaria) Dobrinka Smilanova	(Israel) Leon Pougatch (Israel) Svetlana Zilberman	15–3, 2–15, 13–15	(silver) Runner-up
1998	Cyprus International	(Bulgaria) Diana Koleva	(Israel) Leon Pougatch (Israel) Rina Fridman	15–3, 10–15, 15–3	(gold) Winner
1998	Romanian International	(Bulgaria) Diana Koleva	(Romania) Florin Posteucă (Romania) Adina Posteucă	15–11, 15–2	(gold) Winner

BWF International Challenge tournament
BWF International Series tournament
BWF Future Series tournament
