= Stiliyan Makarski =

Bulgarian badminton player (born 1985)

Personal information
- Born: 18 March 1985 (age 41) Veliko Tarnovo, Bulgaria

Sport
- Country: Bulgaria
- Sport: Badminton

Men's singles & doubles
- Highest ranking: 102 (MS 15 July 2010); 140 (MD 11 July 2013); 28 (XD 21 January 2010)
- BWF profile

Stiliyan Makarski (Bulgarian: Стилиян Макарски; born 18 March 1985) is a Bulgarian badminton player. In 2008, he won the Banuinvest International tournament in mixed doubles event.

== Achievements ==
=== BWF International Challenge/Series ===
Men's doubles
Year	Tournament	Partner	Opponent	Score	Result
2006	Banu Sport International	(Bulgaria) Vladimir Metodiev	(Bulgaria) Georgi Petrov (Bulgaria) Blagovest Kisyov	22–20, 21–19	(gold) Winner
2007	Hatzor International	(Bulgaria) Vladimir Metodiev	(Germany) Jochen Cassel (Germany) Thomas Tesche	19–21, 13–21	(silver) Runner-up

Mixed doubles
Year	Tournament	Partner	Opponent	Score	Result
2006	Banu Sport International	(Bulgaria) Diana Dimova	(Bulgaria) Vladimir Metodiev (Bulgaria) Petya Nedelcheva	21–16, 16–21, 21–11	(gold) Winner
2008	Banuinvest International	(Bulgaria) Diana Dimova	(Poland) Łukasz Moreń (Poland) Małgorzata Kurdelska	21–15, 10–21, 21–18	(gold) Winner
2014	Bulgarian Eurasia Open	(Switzerland) Céline Tripet	(France) Alexandre Hammer (France) Joanna Chaube	11–7, 8–11, 10–11, 9–11	(silver) Runner-up
2019	Bulgarian International	(Bulgaria) Diana Dimova	(Finland) Julius von Pfaler (Finland) Jenny Nyström	17–21, 21–13, 21–17	(gold) Winner

BWF International Challenge tournament
BWF International Series tournament
BWF Future Series tournament
