= Badminton in the United States =

United States sports game

- Country: United States
- Governing body: USA Badminton
- National team: United States Olympic team
- First played: 1878 New York Badminton Club
- Registered players: USA Badminton has over 4000 members

International competitions
- Summer Olympics; BWF World Championships; Pan American Badminton Championships; U.S. Open Badminton Championships

In the United States over 1,362,000 people frequently play badminton throughout the year, as of 2008.

== Gameplay ==
Badminton

In badminton, the objective of the game is to hit the shuttlecock over the net and into your opponents boundary. If both of you are able to hit the shuttlecock or birdie back and forth a rally has ensued. A rally is won if one player hits the shuttlecock out of bounds or into the net. Games go to 21 points. The winner of three games wins the set.

=== Scoring ===
Games go to 21 points. If the score is 20-20, then it is win by two points. For example, 22–24. If the score manages to get to 29-29 then the next score wins.

=== Other rules ===
1. The side that wins the game will serve first to start off the next game.
2. A minute interval is allowed between games.
3. During the third game, once the leading players score is 11, both players must switch sides.

== History ==
In the United States the first badminton club was formed in New York in 1878. During the 1930s, badminton had become a popular sport in the United States. Establishments such as the YMCA, universities and more all formed badminton clubs and the popularity of the sport began to take growth. The sport was also aided by the support of celebrity participation. Celebrities such as Bette Davis, Douglas Fairbanks, Dick Powell, and others all participated in the sport, helping badminton gain popularity during the mid-half of the 20th century.

Starting in 1936, the American Badminton Association was formed; however, in 1978 and 1996, the name would be changed to its current name of USA Badminton (or USAB). The main reason for the evolutionary changes is due to different groups and clubs from all around the United States uniting to standardize the rules of the game.

The time period between 1949 and 1967 was the biggest period of badminton popularity in the United States. In 1949, David Freeman brought the United States its first ever world championship title. Freeman won the Men's Singles at the All-England Championships. Additionally, between 1949 and 1967 the United States won 23 championships in badminton. The success led to Sports Illustrated featuring Joe Alston on the Cover of the March issue of 1955 to recognize the United States successes in badminton during that time period.

In 2016, USAB announced that they would be relocating their professional training facilities and headquarters from Colorado Spring to Anaheim, California.

== Important figures ==
=== Ben Lee ===
Lee is the current USAB Board of Directors Chair. Lee was elected in 2017 to take over the spot of David Simon. Lee is a former Olympian, having competed at the 1992 Games in Barcelona. He was also formerly the head coach of Team USA at the 2012 Summer Olympics in London. Additionally, Lee is a nine-time United States doubles champion and has also been inducted into the United States Badminton Walk of Fame.

Lee will remain in the position of Board Chair until 2020. Lee will be eligible to run for another four-year term.

=== Nibu Paul ===
Paul is the current Coaching Director for USAB. Paul will serve on the Board of Directors while also helping with strategic planning and coaching objectives. He is a certified coach who has over 15 years of experience. Additionally, Paul is a Technology Manager in Texas where he oversees 15 developers.

Paul's term will run until 2020 where he will be up for re-election. If elected, Paul can serve up to another four years.

=== Diane Cornell ===
On January 7, 2020, Diane Cornell died after her fight with breast cancer for many years. Diane served as president of the United States Badminton Association (now USA Badminton) in the 1990s. During her time as president, she worked in partnership with IBF (now known as BWF) to welcome individuals to the 1996 Olympic Games in Atlanta.

Outside of badminton, Diane was a long-time official for the Federal Communications Commission (FCC) and served as chairmen for several years. In 2017, her work was recognized with the FCBA Excellence Award in Government Service.

=== Beiwen Zhang ===
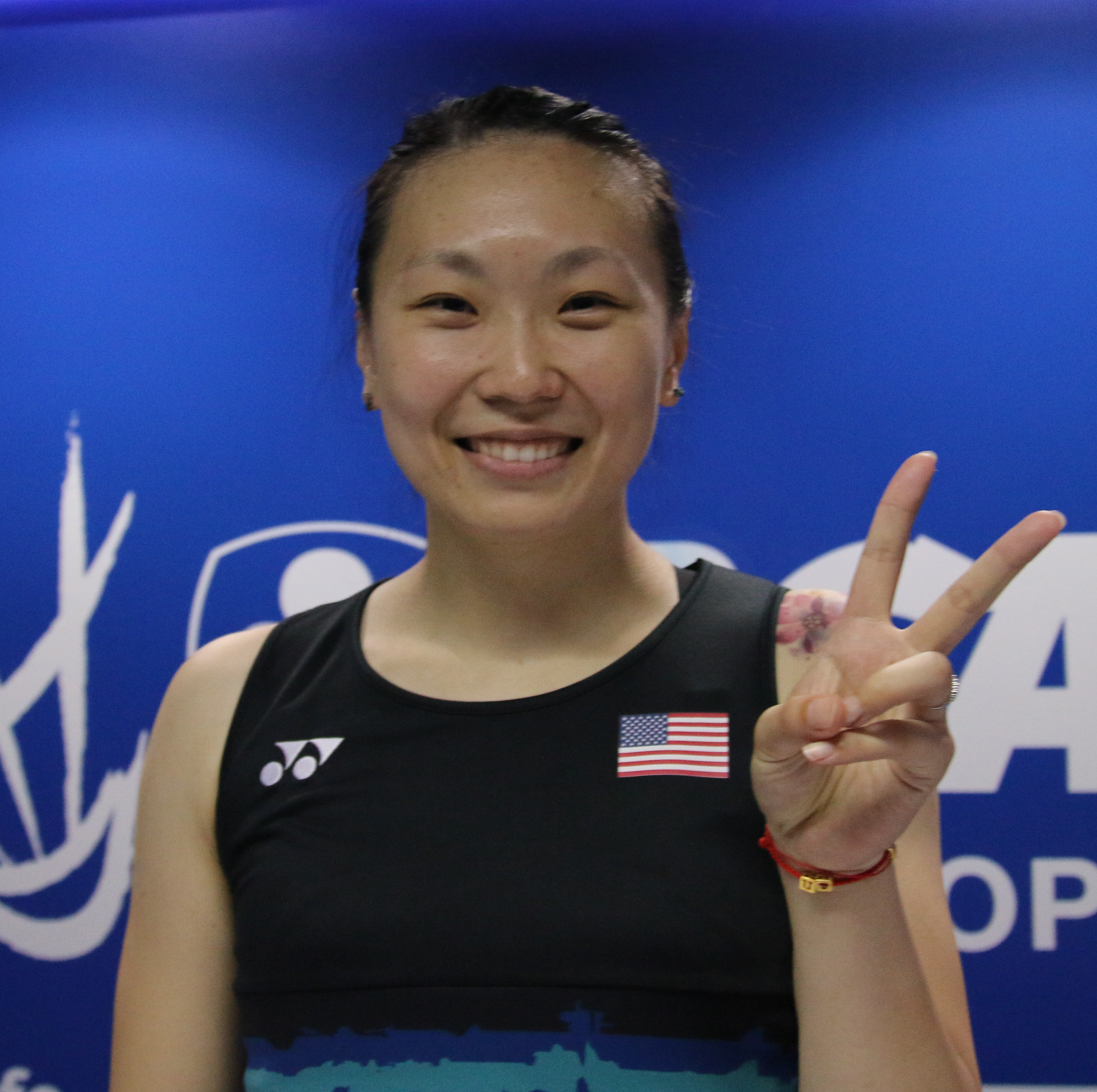
Zhang Beiwen - Indonesia Open 2017

Beiwen Zhang is one of the most successful United States professional badminton players. She has a record of 290 wins and 170 losses. Zhang has made over $250,000 in prize money from her accomplishments. She is currently ranked 16th in the world.

Beiwen Zhang started playing badminton at the age of eight. The reason she started playing was because her immune system did not function properly, and Zhang's parents encouraged her to participate in a sport in order to strengthen it. Zhang started playing competitively in 2004.

== Popularity ==
Badminton is not a popular sport in the United States for several reasons. One of the main reasons is that badminton in the U.S. is seen as a backyard sport. Due to this, the sport has not grown much. Another reason is the lack of Olympic success by American athletes. This lack of success is another reason why the sport has not grown in comparison to other sports. Finally, wages are a huge reason why badminton has not grown. Badminton fails to receive substantial media attention in the United States and with that comes low wages. Participants can earn up to $15,000 for winning a championship, which is a relatively small amount of money in comparison to an average football player that has a salary of $2.7 million.

== USAB National Elite Rankings ==
As of December 6, 2019 the National Elite Rankings for team USA in Badminton were:

=== Men's singles ===
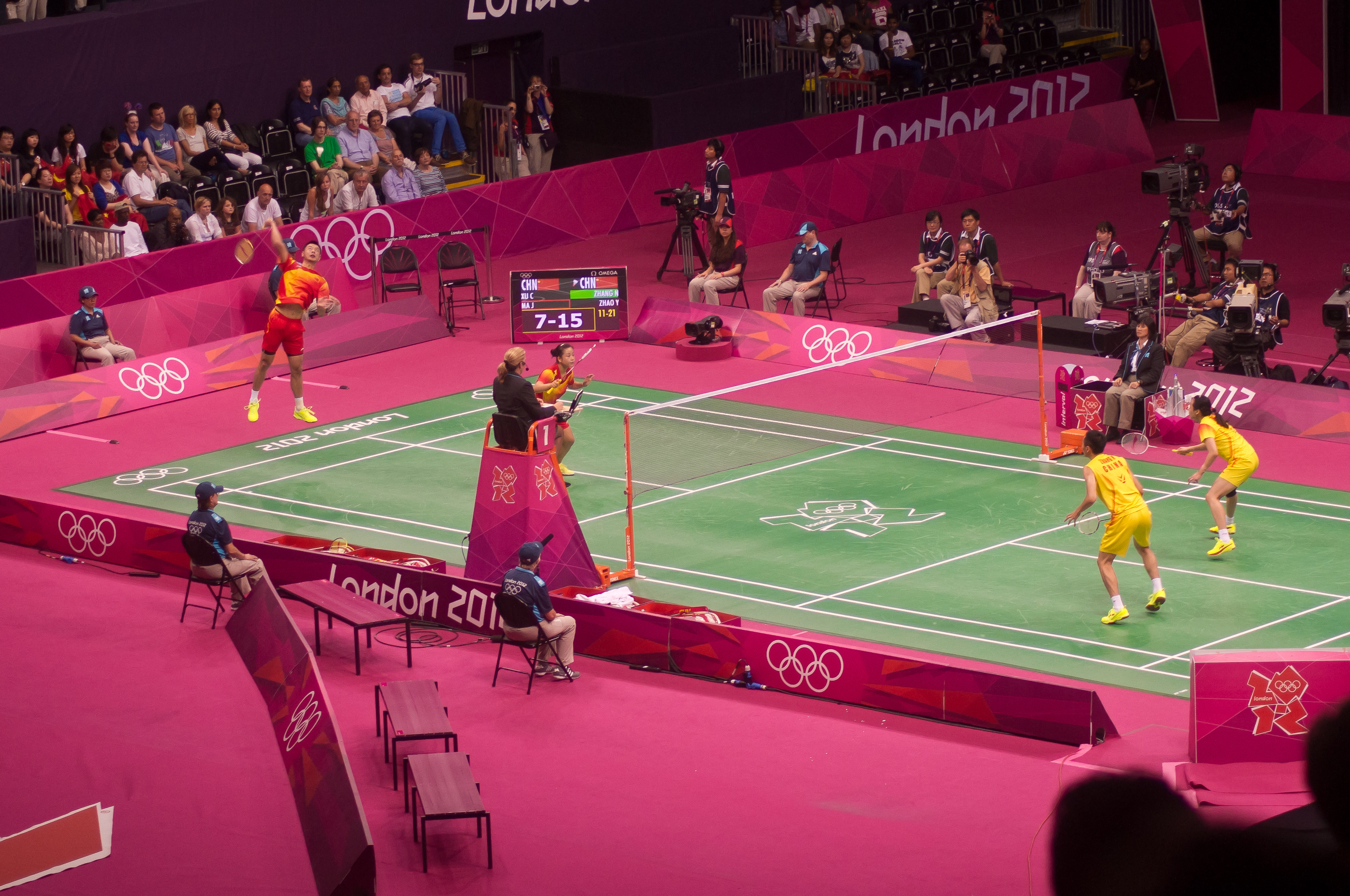
Olympics 2012 Mixed Doubles Final

1. Timothy Lam
2. Howard Shu
3. Mark Alcala

=== Women's singles ===
1. Beiwen Zhang
2. Isabel Zhong
3. Iris Wang

=== Men's doubles ===
1. Philip Chew and Ryan Chew
2. Ferdinand Sinarta and Sattawat Pongnairat
3. Hongkheng Yew and Yaohan Ow

=== Women's doubles ===
1. Sydney Lee and Ariel Lee
2. Jennie Gai and Breanna Chi
3. Isabel Zhong and Emily Kan

=== Mixed doubles ===
1. Paula O'Banana and Howard Shu
2. Brenna Chi and Vinson Chiu
3. Isabel Zhong and Mathew Fogarty

== National team ==
The United States men's and women's national teams have had limited success at the Summer Olympics.

== See also ==
- Badminton at the Summer Olympics - history of badminton at the Summer Olympics.
