= Hagoita =

Japanese sports equipment

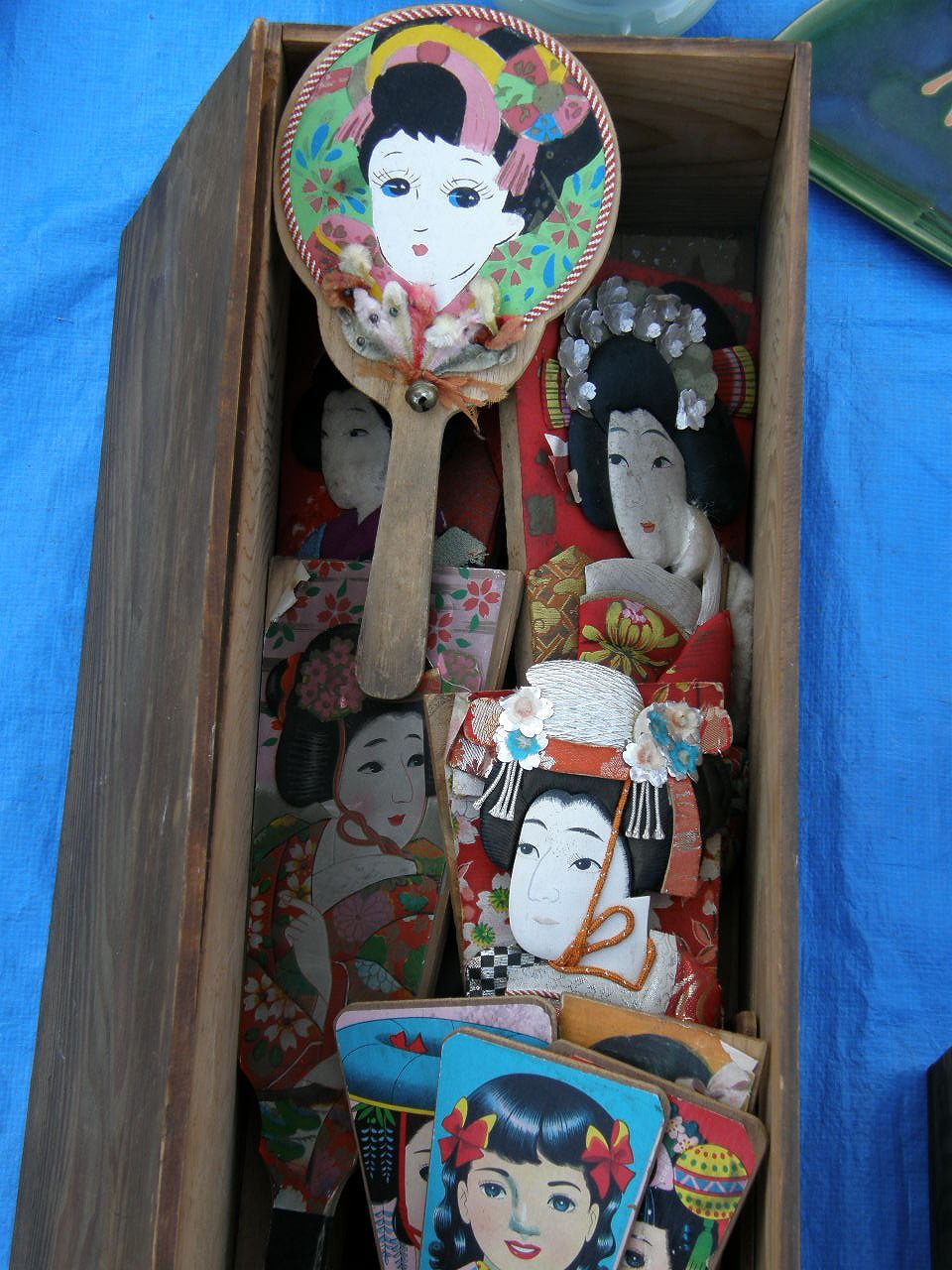
Assorted hagoita

Hagoita (羽子板 ｢はごいた｣) are the wooden paddles used to hit shuttlecocks (羽子 pronounced hago ｢はご｣ or hane ｢はね｣), traditionally made of soapberry seeds and bird feathers, that are used to play the traditional Japanese pastime called hanetsuki during the New Year. The paddles are decorated with various images, sometimes executed in relief, of women in kimono, kabuki actors, and so on. Japanese people think playing hanetsuki is a way to drive away evil spirits because the movement of the hagoita is similar to the harau action (a Japanese expression meaning "to drive away"). Thus playing hanetsuki with hagoita is often used as a charm against evil.

== History ==
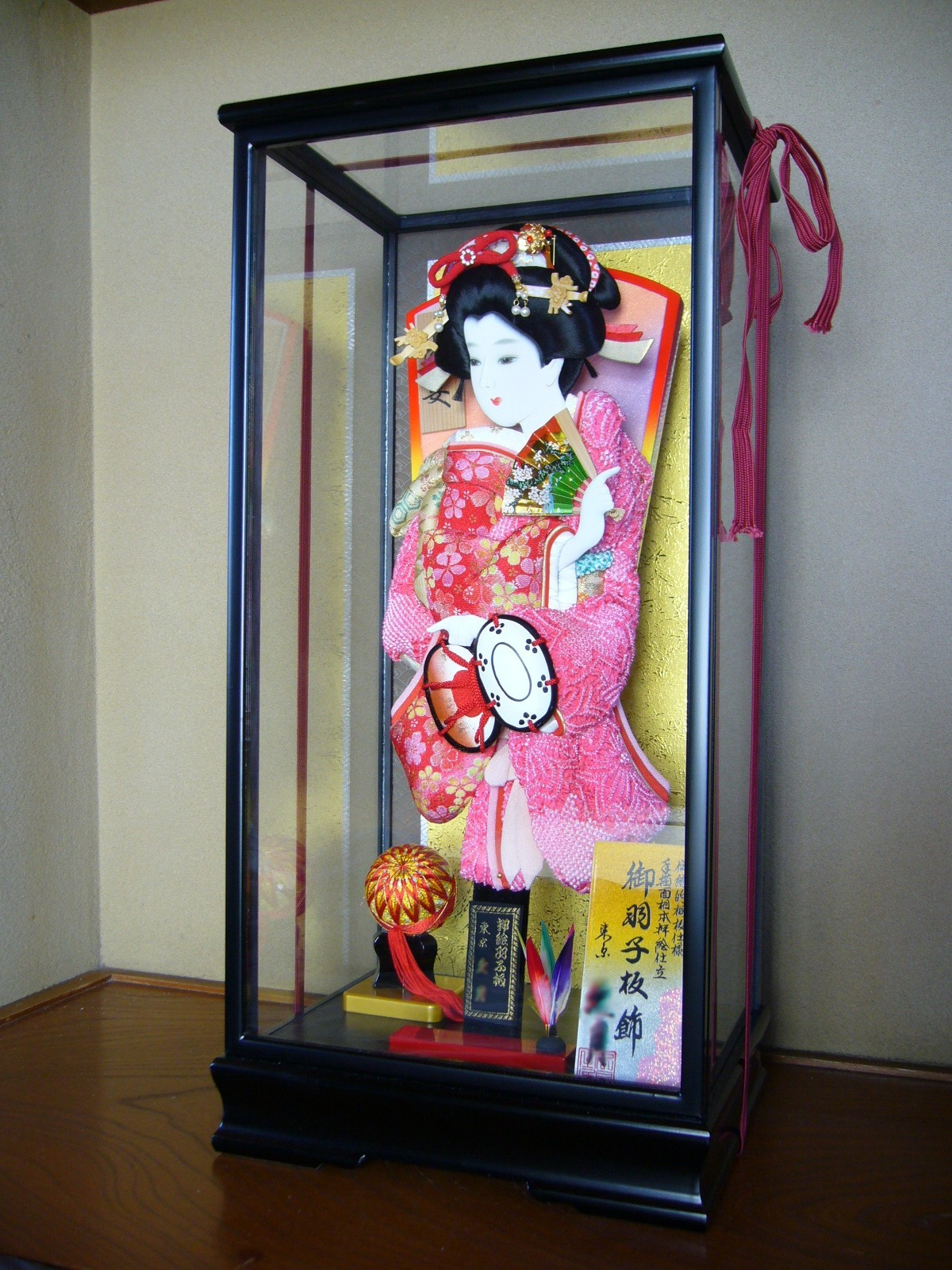
Hagoita-kazari (羽子板飾り)

Hagoita were introduced into Japan during the Muromachi period (1336–1573) from Ming dynasty China. In the Edo period (1603–1868), oshie-hagoita were designed with images of elegantly made-up kabuki actors (oshie meaning raised cloth pictures). They were made using washi or cloth cut out in the shape of flowers and people and pasted onto the paddle stuffed with cotton to give them a three-dimensional appearance. Over time, hagoita were not only used as game equipment but also as popular gifts and collectibles. During the Edo and Meiji period, many different kinds appeared; some high-quality paddles even used gold leaf and silver foil. With the industrial revolution, improved manufacturing technology promoted the development of hagoita. Also, among farmers, producing hagoita was a popular off-season side business.

After World War II, hagoita became popular decorations and souvenirs for locals and tourists. At present, hagoita are not limited to featuring portraits of kabuki actors but also of movie and TV stars and of famous athletes. For 350 years, an annual hagoita market has been held at the Sensō-ji temple in Tokyo. Operating from December 17 to 19, it attracts a large number of customers and also marks the end of the old year and the beginning of the new.
