= USA Badminton =

National sport governing body

- Sport: Badminton
- Jurisdiction: United States
- Abbreviation: USAB
- Founded: 1936; 90 years ago
- Affiliation: Badminton World Federation; United States Olympic & Paralympic Committee
- Headquarters: El Monte, California, U.S.
- Chairman: Fred S. Teng
- Operating income: $195,389 (2021)
- Sponsor: Yonex, Tinsue, United Airlines

Official website
- www.usabadminton.org
- (United States)

USA Badminton (USAB) is the national governing body for the sport of badminton in the United States. There are currently 66 badminton clubs registered as of January 2019.

== History ==
The American Badminton Association was founded in 1936 when Donald Wilbur, Robert McMillan, Donald Richardson, and Phillip Richardson decided to unite various badminton groups in the country. The name was changed to United States Badminton Association in 1978, and later changed to its present name in 1996.

USA Badminton used to train its elite players at a national training center in Colorado Springs, but they relocated to Anaheim in early 2017.

Badminton is not a popular sport in the United States for several reasons. One of the main reasons is that badminton in the U.S. is seen as a backyard sport. Due to this, the sport has not grown much. Another reason is the lack of Olympic success by American athletes. This lack of success is another reason why the sport has not grown in comparison to other sports. Finally, wages are a huge reason why badminton has not gown. Badminton fails to receive substantial media attention in the United States and with that comes low wages. Participants can earn up to $15,000 for winning a championship, which is a relatively small amount of money in comparison to an average football player that has a salary of $2.7 million.

=== 2026 Decertification and Governance Reorganization ===
In September 2026, the United States Olympic & Paralympic Committee (USOPC) officially decertified USA Badminton as the National Governing Body (NGB) for the sport in the United States after it was provisionally decertified in June 2025. Prior to the decision, the organization had experienced ongoing financial distress stemming from a substantial legal judgment and subsequent Chapter 11 bankruptcy filing.

According to USOPC Chief Executive Officer Sarah Hirshland, USA Badminton was stripped of its status because it was unable to meet mandatory compliance and certification parameters. Following the decertification, the USOPC initiated discussions with the Badminton World Federation (BWF) to establish a new organizational structure and identify leadership capable of managing badminton in the United States at both the recreational and elite levels.

Amidst the decertification process, the USOPC assumed direct oversight of the badminton high-performance programs, elite athlete funding, and international team selection. They act as the safety net to ensure athletes can continue training and competing. Under an operational "Reset Plan" coordinated with the BWF, the USOPC serves as the interim operational authority to manage athlete entries into BWF-sanctioned Olympic qualifying events. The USOPC announced that it would defer the formal application process for a newly designated permanent NGB until after the conclusion of the LA28 Olympic Games, leaving USA Badminton under transitional restructuring through the Olympic cycle.

== Tournaments ==
- U.S. Open Badminton Championships, an annual open tournament first held in 1954.
- U.S. International, an international tournament sponsored by K&D Graphics and Yonex.
- USA International, a discontinued tournament formerly known as Miami PanAm International.

== Controversy ==
In January 2023, it was reported that USA Badminton had paid $1 million to settle a dispute with a former employee who previously served as the federation's chief of staff and SafeSport compliance officer. The former employee claimed he had been fired in retaliation for reporting allegations of sexual abuse by a prominent coach to the U.S. Center for SafeSport, after being pressured by USA Badminton's CEO and its general counsel. U.S. law requires any employees of a national governing body to report suspicions of abuse immediately to law enforcement and to SafeSport. Earlier, U.S. Senator Chuck Grassley, Ranking Member of the Senate Judiciary Committee, warned the leadership of USA Badminton about their potential breaches and alleged obstruction of an investigation by SafeSport.
