= Hanetsuki =

Japanese shuttlecock game

Hanetsuki being played in Shimane, 2016

Hanetsuki (Japanese: 羽根突き or 羽子突き) is a Japanese traditional game, similar to racket games like badminton but without a net, played with a rectangular wooden paddle called a hagoita and a brightly coloured shuttlecock, called a hane. Often played by girls at the New Year, the game can be played by any gender in two fashions: by one person attempting to keep the shuttlecock aloft as long as possible, or by two people batting it back and forth. Players who fail to hit the shuttlecock get marked on the face with India Ink. Traditionally, the longer the shuttlecock remains in the air, the greater protection from mosquitoes the players will receive during the coming year. Although hanetsuki is not as popular as it used to be, decorative hagoita are commonly sold throughout Japan.

The game is also known as Oibane (追い羽根, 追羽根, or 追羽子).

Hagoita often have pictures of kabuki theatre performers or celebrities on them.

At the beginning of the game's development, soapberry nuts were often used as shuttlecocks.

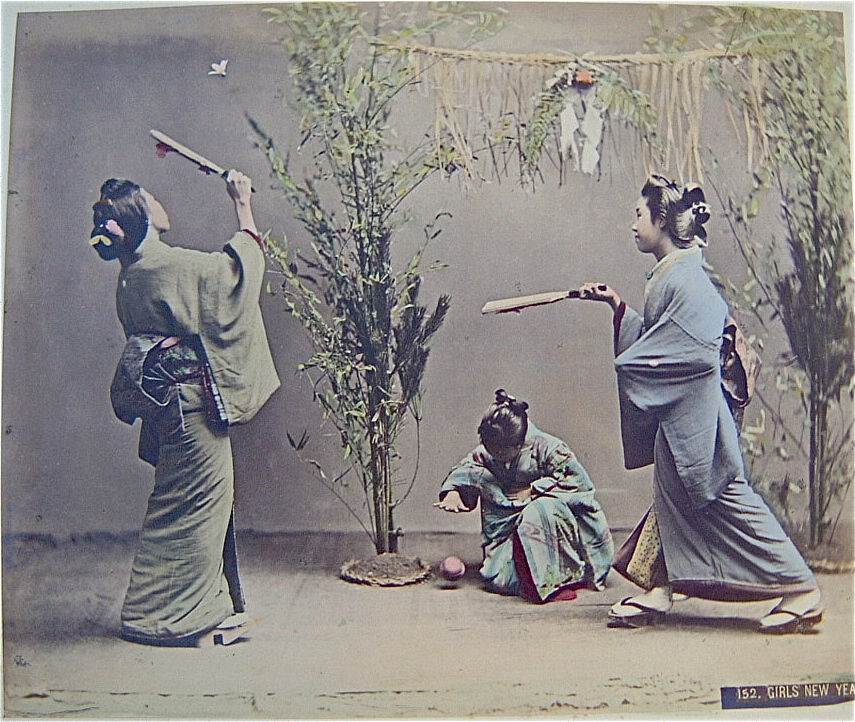
Hanetsuki

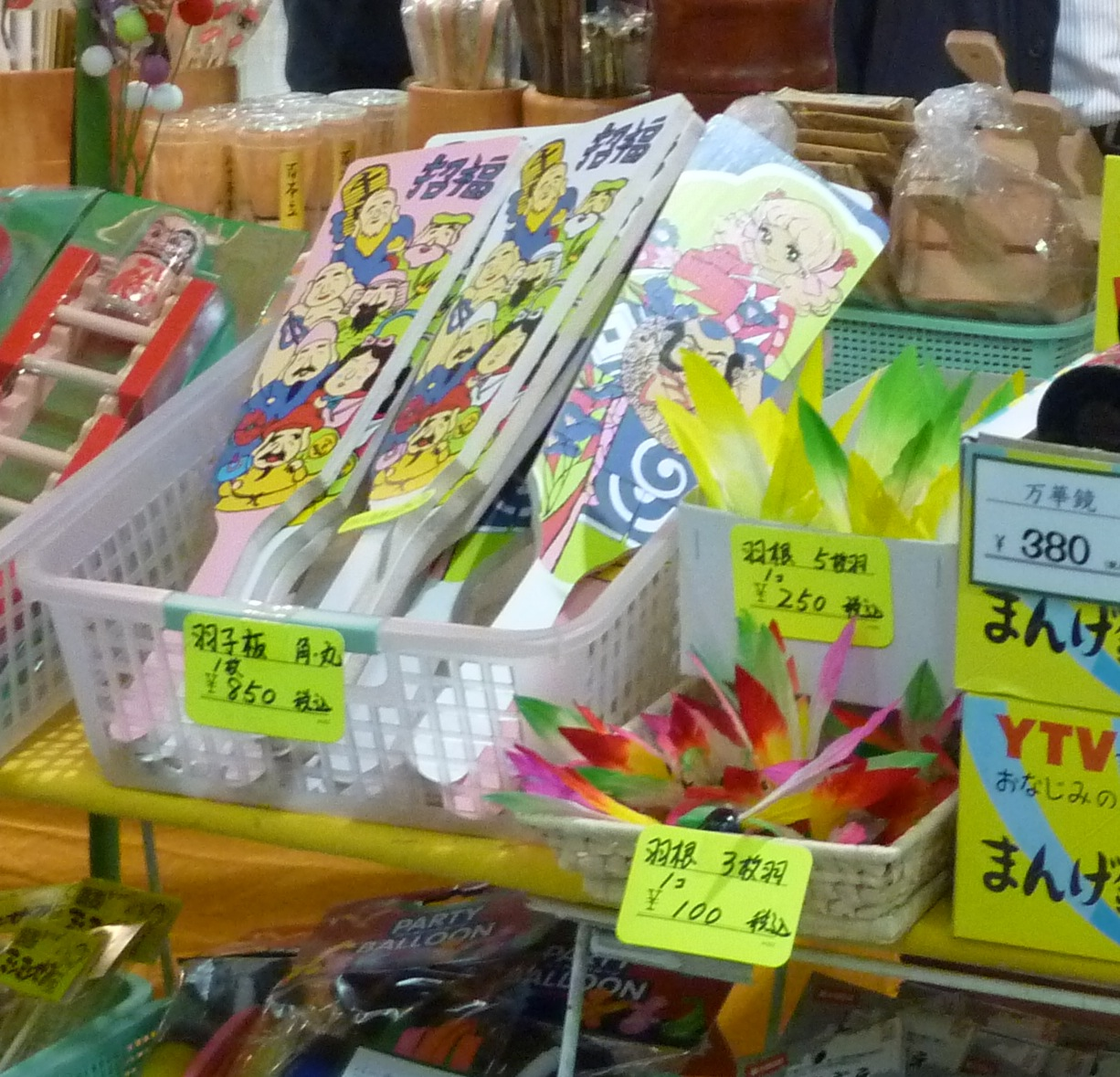
Hanetsuki paddles (left) and shuttlecocks (right) being sold at a shop in a train station.

== See also ==
- Battledore and shuttlecock
