= Spanish Badminton Federation =

Spanish Badminton Federation; Federación Española de Bádminton
- Formation: 1983; 43 years ago
- Type: National Sport Association
- Headquarters: Madrid, Spain
- President: David Cabello
- Affiliations: BEC, BWF
- Website: badminton.es

The Spanish Badminton Federation (FESBA, Spanish: Federación Española de Bádminton) is the governing body for the sport of badminton in Spain. The organization hosts the annual Spanish International Badminton Tournament and has also hosted the 2001 and 2006 IBF World Championships.

As of 2022, the federation has 306 registered clubs and 9,715 federated badminton players.

== Tournaments ==
- Spanish International Badminton Tournament (Spain International), first held in 1974.
- Spain Masters, a new tournament first held in 2018 and also part of BWF World Tour.

== Presidents ==
Four presidents have served in the organization since 1986.

No.	Name	Years
1	José Luis Vila Piñeiro	1984 - 1996
2	Francisco Carracedo Arranz	1997 - 1999
3	Manuel Hernández Vázquez	1999 - 2004
4	David Cabello	2004 - 2020
5	Andoni Azurmendi Ibarrola	2020 -
