= Federação Portuguesa de Badminton =

- Formation: 1954
- Headquarters: Caldas da Rainha
- President: Duarte Gil Anjo
- General Secretary: Patricia Rosa
- Affiliations: BEC, BWF
- Website: fpbadminton.pt

Federação Portuguesa de Badminton is the governing body for badminton in Portugal. Their headquarters is located in Caldas da Rainha.

== Major tournaments ==
- Portugal International
- Portugal Junior International Championships
- Campeonato Nacional de Seniores
- Campeonato Nacional de Equipas
- Campeonato Nacional de Juniores
