= Battledore and shuttlecock =

Early game related to badminton

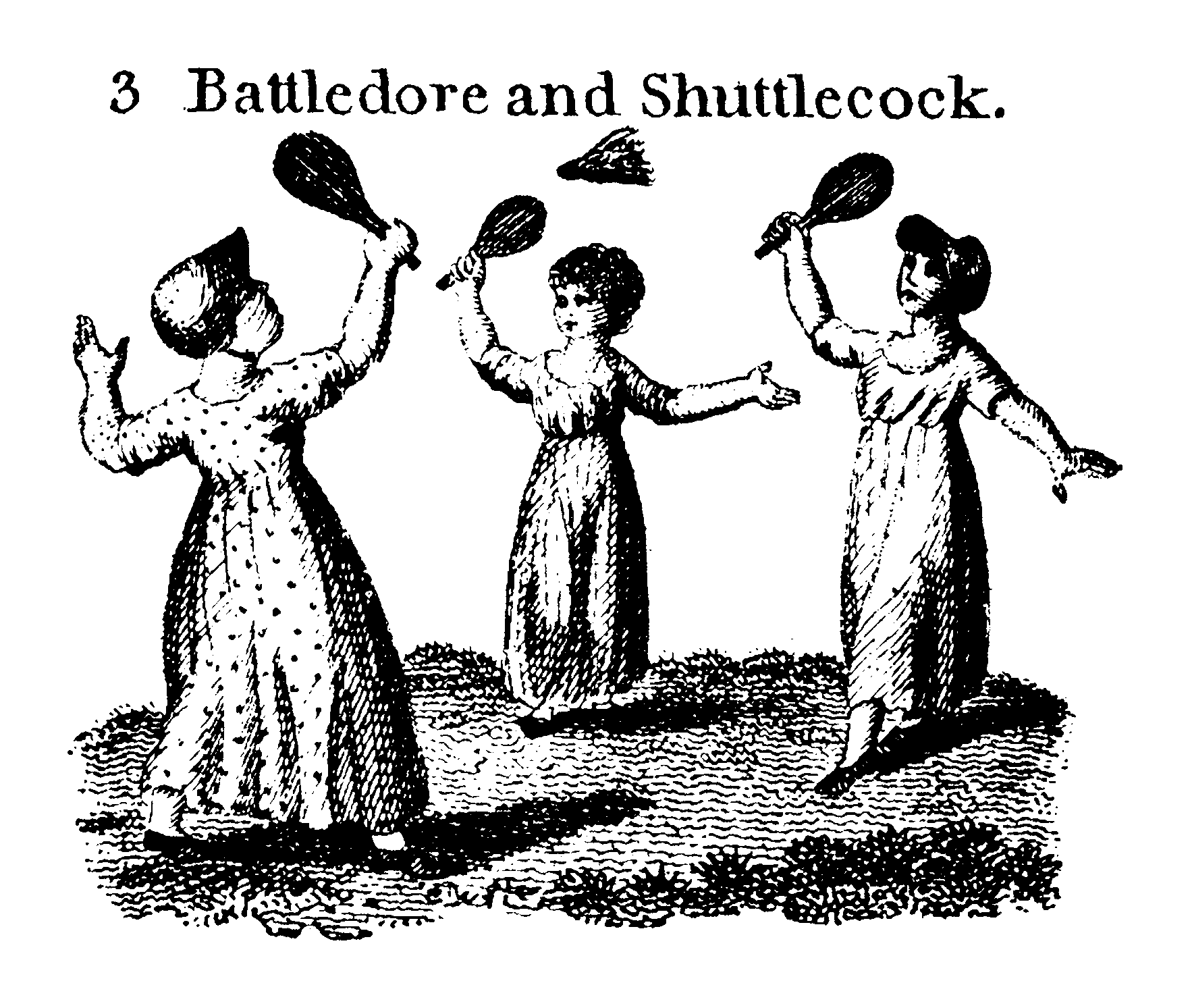
A game of battledore and shuttlecock, as illustrated in an 1804 edition of Youthful Sports

Battledore and shuttlecock, or jeu de volant, is a game ancestral to the modern sport of badminton. It is played by two or more people using small rackets (battledores), made of parchment or rows of gut stretched across wooden frames, and shuttlecocks, made of a base of some light material, such as cork, with trimmed feathers fixed around the top. The object is for players to bat the shuttlecock from one to the other as many times as possible without allowing it to fall to the ground.

== History ==
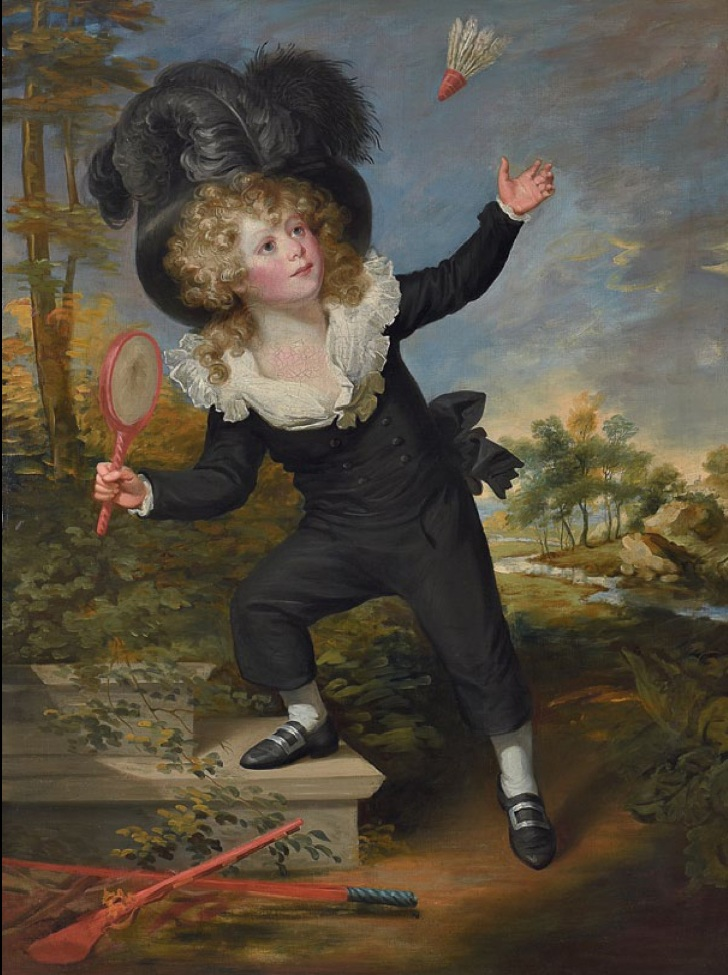
William Beechey, Kenneth Dixon playing with a shuttlecock, c. 1790.

Games with a shuttlecock are attested to as early as 2,000 years ago, and have been popular in India, China, Japan, and Siam. Various traditional shuttlecock games have been played by North American Indigenous peoples, including the Kwakwakaʼwakw, Akimel O'odham, Coast Salish, and Zuni; they are often played with a feathered shuttle made of corn husk or twigs and sometimes a wooden battledore. In Europe, battledore and shuttlecock was played by children for centuries (the OED dates the words to 1598 and 1599 respectively), and ancient drawings appearing to depict the game have been found in Greece.

It was still being played in the College Garden, Glasgow, Scotland in August 1850, and Japan in 1890 and 1910.

== Australia in the 1800s and early 1900s ==
Settled by Europeans in 1788, by 1804 in Sydney town, at the home of Sergeant Packer on Pitt's Row, among foods and clothing being sold were... 'Tamborines, and music boxes, set to irregular airs, Battledores and shuttlecocks'; also commonly sold in the 1830s and 1850s.

The sport was played at the Sydney's George Street Police Racket Ground in April 1850 by Sir Thomas Livingstone Mitchell and others for 1:47 hours. It was still being mentioned or played in 1910.

Noting its origins with battledore and shuttlecocks, the new activity of badminton was introduced to the readers within the Australian colonies in 1874, gaining popularity in the 1920s. Its demise was signalled with the formation of state badminton associations such as in South Australia in February 1930.

== Phrase ==
'Battledore and shuttlecock' was used as a figure of speech to describe a rallying argument, debate, or political game. An 1841 comment in the Hobart Town Advertiser stated 'Battledore and shuttlecock's very good game, when you arn't the shuttlecocks and two lawyers the battledore, in which case it gets too excitin' to be pleasant'.

== See also ==
- Hanetsuki, a Japanese variant
- Keepie uppie, with a soccer ball
- Footbag, including the "Hacky Sack" brand
