= Badminton Europe =

Badminton association

- Sport: Badminton
- Membership: 53 member associations 1 associate member
- Abbreviation: BEC
- Founded: 27 September 1967; 58 years ago
- Headquarters: Brøndby, Denmark
- President: (Belgium) Sven Serré

Official website
- www.badmintoneurope.com

Badminton Europe (BEC) is the governing body of badminton in Europe. It is one of the five continental bodies under the flag of the Badminton World Federation (BWF). It has 53 member associations and 1 associate member. It was founded on 27 September 1967 in Frankfurt, Germany.

At its annual meeting held on 8 April 2006 the members decided to change the name from European Badminton Union, to Badminton Europe.

== Presidents ==
No.	Years	Name
1	1967–1968	(Switzerland) Hans Peter Kuntz
2	1969–1977	(Sweden) Stellan Mohlin
3	1977–1982	(Netherlands) Herman Valken
4	1982–1984	(West Germany) Heinrich Barge
5	1984–1992	(United Kingdom) Stan Mitchell
6	1992–2004	(Denmark) Torsten Berg
7	2004–2010	(Denmark) Tom Bacher
8	2010–2014	(Denmark) Poul-Erik Høyer Larsen
9	2014–2019	(Belgium) Gregory Verpoorten
10	2019–2023	(Slovakia) Peter Tarcala
11	2023–present	(Belgium) Sven Serré

== Member associations ==
- Albania
- Armenia
- Austria
- Azerbaijan
- Belarus (suspended)
- Belgium
- Bosnia and Herzegovina
- Bulgaria
- Croatia
- Cyprus
- Czech Republic
- Denmark
- England
- Estonia
- Faroe Islands
- Finland
- France
- (Georgia (country)) Georgia
- Germany
- Gibraltar
- Greece
- Greenland
- Hungary
- Iceland
- (Republic of Ireland) Ireland
- Israel
- Italy
- Kosovo
- Latvia
- Liechtenstein
- Lithuania
- Luxembourg
- North Macedonia
- Malta
- Moldova
- Monaco
- Montenegro
- Netherlands
- Norway
- Poland
- Portugal
- Romania
- Russia (suspended)
- Scotland
- Serbia
- (Slovakia) Slovak Republic
- Slovenia
- Spain
- Sweden
- Switzerland
- Turkey
- Ukraine
- Wales

=== Associate members ===
- Isle of Man

== Tournaments ==
- European Championships
- European Para Badminton Championships
- European Men's and Women's Team Championships
- European Mixed Team Championships
- European Junior Championships
- European U17 Championships
- European U15 Championships
- European Senior Badminton Championships
- European Circuit
- European Club Championships

Two events were discontinued, they are:

- Helvetia Cup, European B Team Badminton Championships
- Finlandia Cup, European B Junior Team Badminton Championships
