= Shuttlecock =

Sport equipment

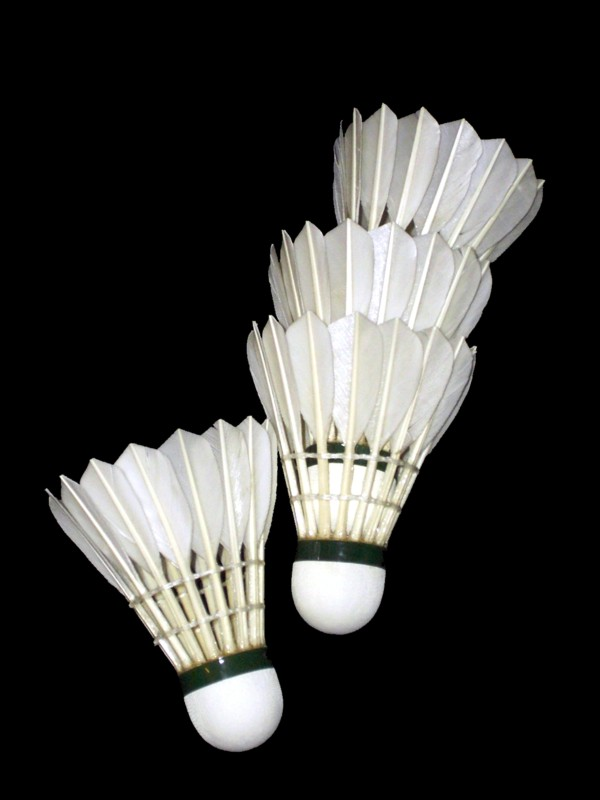
Feather shuttlecocks

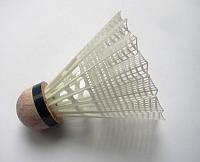
Plastic shuttlecock

A shuttlecock (also called a birdie or shuttle, or ball) is a high-drag projectile, designed to decelerate very quickly, used in multiple sports, most notably badminton. It has an open conical shape formed by feathers or a synthetic material, such as plastic, embedded into a rounded cork (or rubber) base. The shuttlecock's shape makes it extremely aerodynamically stable. Regardless of initial orientation, it will turn to fly cork first, and remain in the cork-first orientation.

== Name origins ==
The name originally came from 1570s England, where the sport was popularized. The "shuttle" part of the name is derived from its back-and-forth motion during the game, resembling the shuttle of a 14th-century loom, while the "cock" part of the name is derived from the resemblance of the feathers to those on a rooster.

== Specifications ==
A regulation standard shuttlecock weighs around 4.75 to 5.50 g (0.168 to 0.194 oz). It has 16 feathers with each feather 62 to 70 mm (2.4 to 2.8 in) in length, and the diameter of the cork is 25 to 28 mm (0.98 to 1.10 in). The diameter of the circle that the feathers make is around 58 to 68 mm (2.3 to 2.7 in).

== Construction and materials ==
A shuttlecock is formed from 16 or so overlapping feathers, usually goose or duck, embedded into a rounded cork base. Feathers are plucked from the wings of a live goose or duck, a method which has been deemed cruel by animal rights activists in recent years. The cork is covered with thin leather. To ensure satisfactory flight properties, it is considered preferable to use feathers from right or left wings only in each shuttlecock, and not mix feathers from different wings, as the feathers from different wings are shaped differently. Badminton companies make shuttlecock corks by sandwiching polyurethane between corks and/or using a whole piece of natural cork. With the first method, the cork becomes misshapen after use, while the cork in the latter method changes very little after use. This is because the structure of the shuttlecock is more durable when made with a single piece of natural cork.

=== Feather or synthetic shuttlecocks ===
The feathers are brittle; shuttlecocks break easily and often need to be replaced several times during a game. For this reason, synthetic shuttlecocks have been developed that replace the feathers with a plastic skirt. Players often refer to synthetic shuttlecocks as plastics and feathered shuttlecocks as feathers. Feather shuttles need to be properly humidified for at least 4 hours prior to play in order to fly the correct distance at the proper speed and to last longer. Properly humidified feathers flex during play, enhancing the shuttle's speed change and durability. Dry feathers are brittle and break easily, causing the shuttle to wobble. Saturated feathers are 'mushy', making the feather cone narrow too much when strongly hit, which causes the shuttle to fly overly far and fast. Typically a humidification box is used, or a small moist sponge is inserted in the feather end of the closed shuttle tube container, avoiding any water contact with the cork of the shuttle. Shuttles are tested prior to play to make sure they fly true and at the proper speed, and cover the proper distance. Different weights of shuttles are used to compensate for local atmospheric conditions. Both humidity and height above sea level affect shuttle flight. World Badminton Federation Rules say the shuttle should reach the far doubles service line plus or minus half the width of the tram. According to manufacturers proper shuttles will generally travel from the back line of the court to just short of the long doubles service line on the opposite side of the net, with a full underhand hit from an average player.

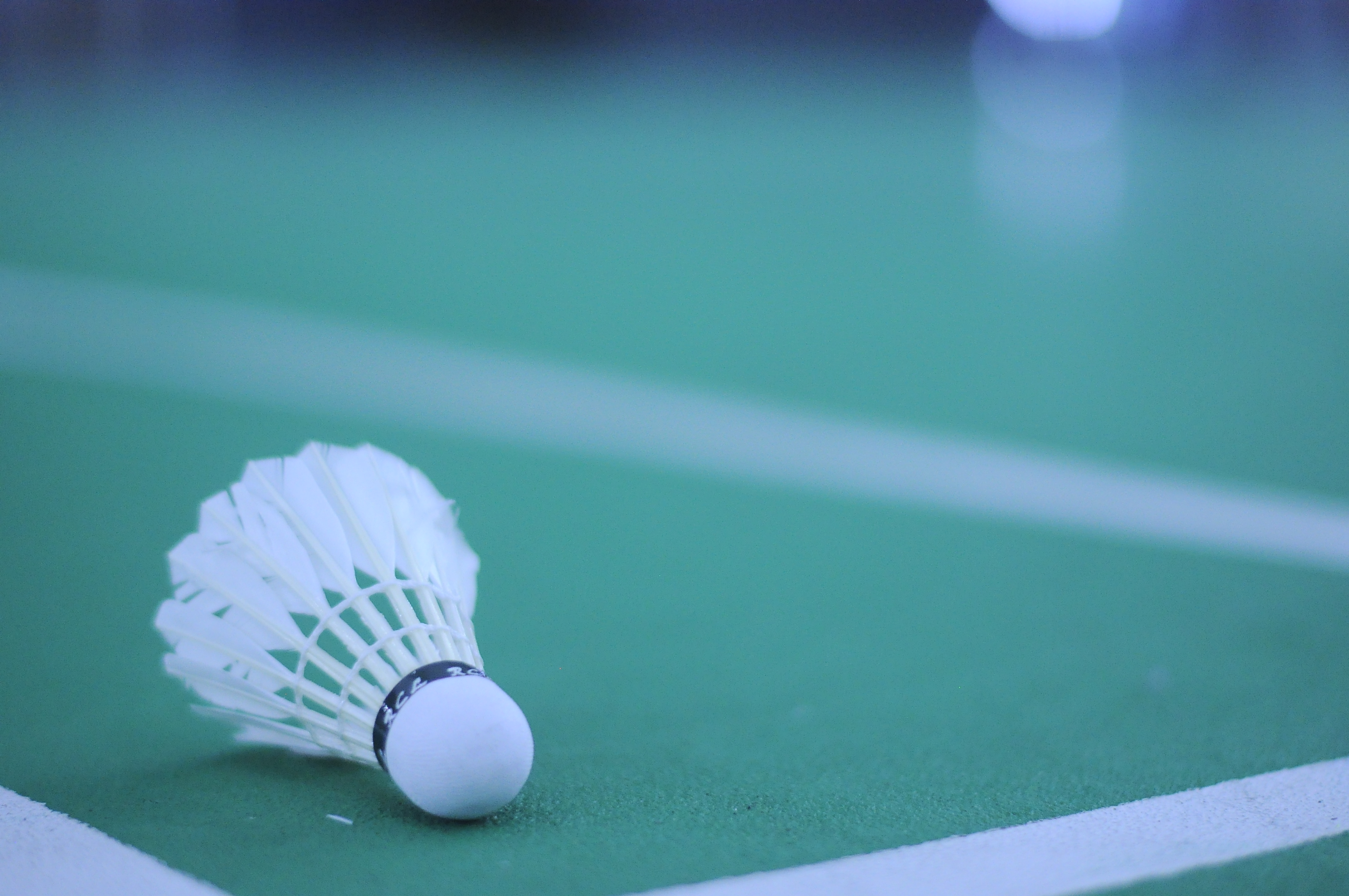
Shuttlecock at a badminton court in Penang, Malaysia.

The cost of good quality feathers is similar to that of good quality plastics, but plastics are far more durable, typically lasting many matches without any impairment to their flight. Feather shuttles are easily damaged and should be replaced every three or four games or sooner if they are damaged and do not fly straight. Damaged shuttles interfere with play as any impairment may misdirect the flight of the shuttlecock.

Most professional players greatly prefer feathers, and serious tournaments or leagues are always played using feather shuttlecocks of the highest quality.

The playing characteristics of plastics and feathers are substantially different. Plastics fly more slowly on initial impact, but slow down less towards the end of their flight. Feathers, however, tend to drop straight down on a clear shot, plastics never quite return to a straight drop, falling more on a diagonal. Feather shuttles may come off the strings at speeds in excess of 565 km/h (351 mph) but slow down faster as they drop. Furthermore, feathered shuttlecocks are recorded as having a constant drag coefficient. Contrarily, championship-grade synthetic shuttlecocks show less consistency with this factor. This shows that feathered shuttlecocks have a capacity for a higher standard speed range at which the game is typically played that synthetics cannot quite reach. This impacts the feel of the bird during the game for players, especially in the case of deformation of the shuttlecock. A feathered shuttlecock will still feel dull and heavy while in play because of the feathers, but a synthetic cannot maintain energy in flight in the same manner.

== Shuttlecock sports ==
- Air Badminton
- Badminton
- Battledore and shuttlecock – an ancient game similar to that of modern badminton
- Crossminton
- Hanetsuki
- Jianzi
- Tambourelli

== See also ==
- Jianzi – a traditional Asian game in which players aim to keep a heavily weighted shuttlecock (Jian) from touching the ground, which is the oldest use of aerial shuttlecocks in sports
- The Corsican Shuttlecock – a satirical cartoon from 1814 featuring Napoleon as a shuttlecock
