= Slovenia national badminton team =

National badminton team representing Slovenia

Slovenia
- Association: Badmintonska Zveza Slovenije (BZS)
- Confederation: BE (Europe)
- President: Tadej Seme

BWF ranking
- Current ranking: 57 ▲3 (2 January 2024)
- Highest ranking: 39 (7 January 2013)

Sudirman Cup
- Appearances: 6 (first in 1993)
- Best result: Group stage

European Mixed Team Championships
- Appearances: 3 (first in 2004)
- Best result: Group stage

European Men's Team Championships
- Appearances: 6 (first in 2004)
- Best result: Group stage

European Women's Team Championships
- Appearances: 4 (first in 2004)
- Best result: Group stage

Helvetia Cup
- Appearances: 5 (first in 1993)
- Best result: Runners-up (2005)

The Slovenia national badminton team (Slovene: Slovenska reprezentanca v badmintonu) represents Slovenia in international badminton team competitions. The Badminton Association of Slovenia organizes any event or national event in the national team. Slovenia competed in the Sudirman Cup until 2007. The men's and women's team also participate in the European meet.

The Slovenian team also competes in the Mediterranean Games.

== Competitive record ==
=== Thomas Cup ===
Year	Round	Pos
1949	Part of Yugoslavia	
1952	Part of Yugoslavia	
1955	Part of Yugoslavia	
1958	Part of Yugoslavia	
1961	Part of Yugoslavia	
1964	Part of Yugoslavia	
1967	Part of Yugoslavia	
1970	Part of Yugoslavia	
1973	Part of Yugoslavia	
1976	Part of Yugoslavia	
1979	Part of Yugoslavia	
1982	Part of Yugoslavia	
1984	Part of Yugoslavia	
1986	Part of Yugoslavia	
1988	Part of Yugoslavia	
1990	Part of Yugoslavia	
1992	Did not enter	
1994	Did not qualify	
1996	Did not qualify	
1998	Did not qualify	
2000	Did not qualify	
2002	Did not qualify	
2004	Did not qualify	
2006	Did not qualify	
2008	Did not enter	
2010	Did not enter	
2012	Did not qualify	
2014	Did not qualify	
2016	Did not qualify	
2018	Did not enter	
2020	Did not qualify	
2022	Did not qualify	
2024	Did not enter	
2026	Did not qualify	
2028	TBD	
2030	TBD	

=== Uber Cup ===
Year	Round	Pos
1957	Part of Yugoslavia	
1960	Part of Yugoslavia	
1963	Part of Yugoslavia	
1966	Part of Yugoslavia	
1969	Part of Yugoslavia	
1972	Part of Yugoslavia	
1975	Part of Yugoslavia	
1978	Part of Yugoslavia	
1981	Part of Yugoslavia	
1984	Part of Yugoslavia	
1986	Part of Yugoslavia	
1988	Part of Yugoslavia	
1990	Part of Yugoslavia	
1992	Did not enter	
1994	Did not qualify	
1996	Did not qualify	
1998	Did not qualify	
2000	Did not qualify	
2002	Did not qualify	
2004	Did not qualify	
2006	Did not qualify	
2008	Did not enter	
2010	Did not enter	
2012	Did not qualify	
2014	Did not enter	
2016	Did not enter	
2018	Did not enter	
2020	Did not enter	
2022	Did not qualify	
2024	Did not enter	
2026	Did not qualify	
2028	TBD	
2030	TBD	

=== Sudirman Cup ===
Year	Round	Pos
1989	Part of Yugoslavia	
1991	Part of Yugoslavia	
1993	Group stage	37th
1995	Group stage	42nd
1997	Group stage	41st
1999	Did not enter	
2001	Group stage	35th
2003	Group stage	32nd
2005	Did not enter	
2007	Group stage	35th
2009	Did not enter	
2011	Did not enter	
2013	Did not enter	
2015	Did not enter	
2017	Did not enter	
2019	Did not enter	
2021	Did not enter	
2023	Did not enter	
2025	TBD	
2027	TBD	
2029	TBD	

=== European Team Championships ===
==== Men's team ====
Year	Round	Pos
2004	Group stage	18th
2006	Group stage	
2008	Did not enter	
2010	Did not enter	
2012	Group stage	
2014	Group stage	
2016	Group stage	
2018	Did not enter	
2020	Group stage	
2024	Did not qualify	
2026	Did not qualify	
2028	To be determined	
2030	To be determined	

==== Women's team ====
Year	Round	Pos
2004	Group stage	12th
2006	Group stage	
2008	Did not enter	
2010	Did not enter	
2012	Group stage	
2014	Did not enter	
2016	Did not enter	
2018	Did not enter	
2020	Group stage	
2024	Did not qualify	
2026	Did not qualify	
2028	TBD	
2030	TBD	

==== Mixed team ====
Year	Round	Pos
1972	Part of Yugoslavia	
1974	Part of Yugoslavia	
1976	Part of Yugoslavia	
1978	Part of Yugoslavia	
1980	Part of Yugoslavia	
1982	Part of Yugoslavia	
1984	Part of Yugoslavia	
1986	Part of Yugoslavia	
1988	Part of Yugoslavia	
1990	Part of Yugoslavia	
1992	Did not enter	
1994	Did not qualify	
1996	Did not qualify	
1998	Did not qualify	
2000	Did not qualify	
2002	Did not qualify	
2004	Group stage	15th
2006	Did not enter	
2008	Did not enter	
2009	Group stage	
2011	Group stage	
2013	Did not enter	
2015	Did not qualify	
2017	Did not qualify	
2019	Did not qualify	
2021	Did not qualify	
2023	Did not qualify	
2025	Did not qualify	
2027	TBD	
2029	TBD	

=== Helvetia Cup ===
Year	Round	Pos
1962	Part of Yugoslavia	
1963	Part of Yugoslavia	
1964	Part of Yugoslavia	
1965	Part of Yugoslavia	
1966	Part of Yugoslavia	
1967	Part of Yugoslavia	
1968	Part of Yugoslavia	
1969	Part of Yugoslavia	
1970	Part of Yugoslavia	
1971	Part of Yugoslavia	
1973	Part of Yugoslavia	
1975	Part of Yugoslavia	
1977	Part of Yugoslavia	
1979	Part of Yugoslavia	
1981	Part of Yugoslavia	
1983	Part of Yugoslavia	
1985	Part of Yugoslavia	
1987	Part of Yugoslavia	
1989	Part of Yugoslavia	
1991	Part of Yugoslavia	
1993	Group stage	18th
1995	Group stage	11th
1997	Did not enter	
1999	Group stage	10th
2001	Fourth place	4th
2003	Runners-up	2nd
2005	Did not enter	
2007	Did not enter	

=== FISU World University Games ===
==== Mixed team ====
Year	Round	Pos
2007	Did not enter	
2011	Did not enter	
2013	Did not enter	
2015	Did not enter	
2017	Group stage	
2021	Did not enter	
2025	TBD	

=== World University Team Championships ===
==== Mixed team ====
Year	Round	Pos
2008	Did not enter	
2010	Did not enter	
2012	Did not enter	
2014	Did not enter	
2016	Did not enter	
2018	Did not enter	

**Red border color indicates tournament was held on home soil.

== Junior competitive record ==
=== Suhandinata Cup ===
Year	Round	Pos
(China) 2000	Did not enter	
(South Africa) 2002	Did not enter	
(Canada) 2004	Group stage	12th of 20
(South Korea) 2006	Did not enter	
(New Zealand) 2007	Did not enter	
(India) 2008	Did not enter	
(Malaysia) 2009	Did not enter	
(Mexico) 2010	Did not enter	
(Chinese Taipei) 2011	Did not enter	
(Japan) 2012	Did not enter	
(Thailand) 2013	Did not enter	
(Malaysia) 2014	Group stage	26th of 33
(Peru) 2015	Group stage	26th of 39
(Spain) 2016	Group stage	23rd of 52
(Indonesia) 2017	Did not enter	
(Canada) 2018	Did not enter	
(Russia) 2019	Did not enter	
(New Zealand) 2020	Cancelled because of COVID-19 pandemic	
(China) 2021	Cancelled because of COVID-19 pandemic	
(Spain) 2022	Group stage	27th of 37
(United States) 2023	Group stage	19th of 38
(China) 2024	Group stage	22nd of 39
(India) 2025	Group stage	28th of 36
(Egypt) 2026	Group stage	39th of 47

=== European Junior Team Championships ===
==== Mixed team ====
Year	Round	Pos
1975	Part of Yugoslavia	
1977	Part of Yugoslavia	
1979	Part of Yugoslavia	
1981	Part of Yugoslavia	
1983	Part of Yugoslavia	
1985	Part of Yugoslavia	
1987	Part of Yugoslavia	
1989	Part of Yugoslavia	
1991	Part of Yugoslavia	
1993	Group stage	26th
1995	Did not qualify	
1997	Did not qualify	
1999	Did not enter	
2001	Did not qualify	
2003	Group stage	11th
2005	Group stage	16th
2007	Did not enter	
2009	Group stage	
2011	Group stage	
2013	Group stage	
2015	Group stage	
2017	Group stage	
2018	Group stage	
2020	Group stage	
2022	Group stage	
2024	Group stage	

=== Finlandia Cup ===
==== Mixed team ====
Year	Round	Pos
1984	Part of Yugoslavia	
1986	Part of Yugoslavia	
1988	Part of Yugoslavia	
1990	Part of Yugoslavia	
1992	Group stage	17th
1994	Group stage	5th
1996	Group stage	5th
1998	Did not enter	
2000	Group stage	13th
2002	Champions	1st
2004	Did not enter	
2006	Did not enter	

**Red border color indicates tournament was held on home soil.

== Players ==
=== Current squad ===
As of 2 January 2024

==== Men's team ====
Name	DoB/Age	Ranking of event		
Name	DoB/Age	MS	MD	XD
Andraž Krapež	12 January 1997 (age 29)	385	570	-
Miha Ivančič	5 October 1998 (age 28)	239	925	67
Miha Ivanič	22 May 1998 (age 28)	1684	-	935
Maj Poboljšaj	16 February 2001 (age 25)	999	287	717
Gal Bizjak	25 May 2002 (age 24)	980	287	474
Mark Koroša	18 July 2005 (age 21)	1325	451	-
Andraž Pungartnik	21 March 2003 (age 23)	1381	451	1160
Jan Krumpak	16 July 2004 (age 22)	1237	935	455

==== Women's team ====
Name	DoB/Age	Ranking of event		
Name	DoB/Age	WS	WD	XD
Petra Polanc	17 August 2000 (age 26)	155	936	67
Špela Alič	15 April 2004 (age 22)	811	390	947
Lia Šalehar	26 March 1999 (age 27)	-	157	-
Anja Jordan	23 October 2004 (age 21)	656	390	947
Kim Matovič	12 April 2004 (age 22)	657	259	474
Zoja Novak	19 September 2003 (age 23)	1155	157	455
Taja Pipan	26 March 2002 (age 24)	-	-	740
Tinkara Alič	20 March 2008 (age 18)	-	766	-
