= Croatia national badminton team =

National badminton team representing Croatia

Croatia
- Association: Hrvatski Badmintonski Savez (HBS)
- Confederation: BE (Europe)
- President: Ratko Galjer

BWF ranking
- Current ranking: 84 ▲3 (2 January 2024)
- Highest ranking: 44 (1 July 2011)

European Mixed Team Championships
- Appearances: 1 (first in 2011)
- Best result: Group stage

European Men's Team Championships
- Appearances: 5 (first in 2010)
- Best result: Group stage

European Women's Team Championships
- Appearances: 2 (first in 2010)
- Best result: Group stage

Helvetia Cup
- Appearances: 4 (first in 1993)
- Best result: Group stage

The Croatia national badminton team (Croatian: Hrvatska reprezentacija u badmintonu) represents Croatia in international badminton team competitions. The national team was formed after the establishment of the Croatian Badminton Association in Zagreb. The men's and women's team made their debut in the 2010 European Men's and Women's Team Badminton Championships in Warsaw.

The Croatian mixed team only played one team tournament, which was in 2011 when the team qualified for the 2011 European Mixed Team Badminton Championships, but was eliminated in the group stage.

National player Igor Čimbur was called up as a coach for the national team's seniors and juniors.

== Competitive record ==
=== Thomas Cup ===
Year	Round	Pos
1949	Part of Yugoslavia	
1952	Part of Yugoslavia	
1955	Part of Yugoslavia	
1958	Part of Yugoslavia	
1961	Part of Yugoslavia	
1964	Part of Yugoslavia	
1967	Part of Yugoslavia	
1970	Part of Yugoslavia	
1973	Part of Yugoslavia	
1976	Part of Yugoslavia	
1979	Part of Yugoslavia	
1982	Part of Yugoslavia	
1984	Part of Yugoslavia	
1986	Part of Yugoslavia	
1988	Part of Yugoslavia	
1990	Part of Yugoslavia	
1992	Did not enter	
1994	Did not enter	
1996	Did not enter	
1998	Did not enter	
2000	Did not enter	
2002	Did not enter	
2004	Did not enter	
2006	Did not enter	
2008	Did not enter	
2010	Did not qualify	
2012	Did not qualify	
2014	Did not enter	
2016	Did not qualify	
2018	Did not qualify	
2020	Did not qualify	
2022	Did not enter	
2024	Did not enter	
2026	Did not qualify	
2028	TBD	
2030	TBD	

=== Uber Cup ===
Year	Round	Pos
1957	Part of Yugoslavia	
1960	Part of Yugoslavia	
1963	Part of Yugoslavia	
1966	Part of Yugoslavia	
1969	Part of Yugoslavia	
1972	Part of Yugoslavia	
1975	Part of Yugoslavia	
1978	Part of Yugoslavia	
1981	Part of Yugoslavia	
1984	Part of Yugoslavia	
1986	Part of Yugoslavia	
1988	Part of Yugoslavia	
1990	Part of Yugoslavia	
1992	Did not enter	
1994	Did not enter	
1996	Did not enter	
1998	Did not enter	
2000	Did not enter	
2002	Did not enter	
2004	Did not enter	
2006	Did not enter	
2008	Did not enter	
2010	Did not qualify	
2012	Did not qualify	
2014	Did not enter	
2016	Did not enter	
2018	Did not enter	
2020	Did not enter	
2022	Did not enter	
2024	Did not enter	
2026	Did not enter	
2028	TBD	
2030	TBD	

=== Sudirman Cup ===
Year	Round	Pos
1989	Part of Yugoslavia	
1991	Part of Yugoslavia	
1993	Did not enter	
1995	Did not enter	
1997	Did not enter	
1999	Did not enter	
2001	Did not enter	
2003	Did not enter	
2005	Did not enter	
2007	Did not enter	
2009	Did not enter	
2011	Did not enter	
2013	Did not enter	
2015	Did not enter	
2017	Did not enter	
2019	Did not enter	
2021	Did not enter	
2023	Did not enter	
2025	TBD	
2027	TBD	
2029	TBD	

=== European Team Championships ===
==== Men's team ====
Year	Round	Pos
2004	Did not enter	
2006	Did not enter	
2008	Did not enter	
2010	Group stage	
2012	Group stage	
2014	Did not enter	
2016	Group stage	
2018	Group stage	
2020	Group stage	
2024	Did not qualify	
2026	Did not qualify	
2028	To be determined	
2030	To be determined	

==== Women's team ====
Year	Round	Pos
2004	Did not enter	
2006	Did not enter	
2008	Did not enter	
2010	Group stage	
2012	Group stage	
2014	Did not enter	
2016	Did not enter	
2018	Did not enter	
2020	Did not enter	
2024	Did not enter	
2026	Did not enter	
2028	TBD	
2030	TBD	

==== Mixed team ====
Year	Round	Pos
1972	Part of Yugoslavia	
1974	Part of Yugoslavia	
1976	Part of Yugoslavia	
1978	Part of Yugoslavia	
1980	Part of Yugoslavia	
1982	Part of Yugoslavia	
1984	Part of Yugoslavia	
1986	Part of Yugoslavia	
1988	Part of Yugoslavia	
1990	Part of Yugoslavia	
1992	Did not enter	
1994	Did not enter	
1996	Did not enter	
1998	Did not enter	
2000	Did not enter	
2002	Did not enter	
2004	Did not enter	
2006	Did not enter	
2008	Did not enter	
2009	Did not enter	
2011	Group stage	
2013	Did not enter	
2015	Did not qualify	
2017	Did not enter	
2019	Did not enter	
2021	Did not enter	
2023	Did not enter	
2025	Did not qualify	
2027	TBD	
2029	TBD	

=== Helvetia Cup ===
Year	Round	Pos
1962	Part of Yugoslavia	
1963	Part of Yugoslavia	
1964	Part of Yugoslavia	
1965	Part of Yugoslavia	
1966	Part of Yugoslavia	
1967	Part of Yugoslavia	
1968	Part of Yugoslavia	
1969	Part of Yugoslavia	
1970	Part of Yugoslavia	
1971	Part of Yugoslavia	
1973	Part of Yugoslavia	
1975	Part of Yugoslavia	
1977	Part of Yugoslavia	
1979	Part of Yugoslavia	
1981	Part of Yugoslavia	
1983	Part of Yugoslavia	
1985	Part of Yugoslavia	
1987	Part of Yugoslavia	
1989	Part of Yugoslavia	
1991	Part of Yugoslavia	
1993	Group stage	20th
1995	Did not enter	
1997	Group stage	19th
1999	Did not enter	
2001	Did not enter	
2003	Did not enter	
2005	Group stage	12th
2007	Group stage	14th

=== Mediterranean Team Championships ===
==== Mixed team ====
Year	Round	Pos
2019	Did not enter	

**Red border color indicates tournament was held on home soil.

== Junior competitive record ==
=== Suhandinata Cup ===
Year	Round	Pos
2000	Did not enter	
2002	Did not enter	
2004	Did not enter	
2006	Did not enter	
2007	Did not enter	
2008	Did not enter	
2009	Did not enter	
2010	Did not enter	
2011	Did not enter	
2012	Did not enter	
2013	Did not enter	
2014	Did not enter	
2015	Did not enter	
2016	Did not enter	
2017	Did not enter	
2018	Did not enter	
2019	Did not enter	
2022	Did not enter	
2023	Did not enter	
2024	withdrew	

=== European Junior Team Championships ===
==== Mixed team ====
Year	Round	Pos
1975	Part of Yugoslavia	
1977	Part of Yugoslavia	
1979	Part of Yugoslavia	
1981	Part of Yugoslavia	
1983	Part of Yugoslavia	
1985	Part of Yugoslavia	
1987	Part of Yugoslavia	
1989	Part of Yugoslavia	
1991	Part of Yugoslavia	
1993	Did not enter	
1995	Did not enter	
1997	Did not enter	
1999	Did not enter	
2001	Did not enter	
2003	Did not enter	
2005	Did not enter	
2007	Did not enter	
2009	Did not enter	
2011	Group stage	
2013	Group stage	
2015	Group stage	
2017	Did not enter	
2018	Group stage	
2020	Did not enter	
2022	Group stage	
2024	Group stage	

=== Finlandia Cup ===
==== Mixed team ====
Year	Round	Pos
1984	Part of Yugoslavia	
1986	Part of Yugoslavia	
1988	Part of Yugoslavia	
1990	Part of Yugoslavia	
1992	Did not enter	
1994	Did not enter	
1996	Did not enter	
1998	Did not enter	
2000	Did not enter	
2002	Group stage	16th
2004	Group stage	7th
2006	Fourth place	4th

=== Mediterranean Junior Team Championships ===
==== Mixed team ====
Year	Round	Pos
2015	Did not enter	
2017	Runners-up	2nd

**Red border color indicates tournament was held on home soil.

== Players ==
=== Current squad ===
As of 2 January 2024

==== Men's team ====
Name	DoB/Age	Ranking of event		
Name	DoB/Age	MS	MD	XD
Aria Dinata	12 July 2003 (age 22)	171	307	1425
Filip Špoljarec	1 May 1994 (age 31)	282	307	-
Fran Pipunić	12 November 2000 (age 25)	-	918	-
Roko Pipunić	3 February 2006 (age 20)	1623	918	1282
Ivor Zekan	11 October 2004 (age 21)	1443	937	1131
Edvin Hadžihalilović	19 March 1999 (age 26)	1369	937	1402

==== Women's team ====
Name	DoB/Age	Ranking of event		
Name	DoB/Age	WS	WD	XD
Luna Šaban	2 April 2003 (age 22)	457	448	-
Stella Balenović	3 November 2004 (age 21)	1134	448	1131
Barbara Janičić	13 February 2002 (age 24)	983	861	1425
Jelena Buchberger	18 February 2006 (age 20)	1085	-	1282
Nika Matovina	18 December 2004 (age 21)	-	-	-
Ana Pranić	20 January 2008 (age 18)	-	-	-
