= Ukraine national badminton team =

Ukrainian national badminton team

Ukraine
- Association: Ukraine Badminton Federation (UBF)
- Confederation: BE (Europe)
- President: Oleksii Dniprov

BWF ranking
- Current ranking: 29 (2 January 2024)
- Highest ranking: 17 (5 July 2012)

Sudirman Cup
- Appearances: 11 (first in 1989)
- Best result: Group stage

Uber Cup
- Appearances: 1 (first in 2026)
- Best result: Group stage

European Mixed Team Championships
- Appearances: 12 (first in 1994)
- Best result: Quarter-finals (2009, 2013)

European Men's Team Championships
- Appearances: 9 (first in 2004)
- Best result: Fourth place (2010)

European Women's Team Championships
- Appearances: 9 (first in 2004)
- Best result: Bronze medal (2026)

Helvetia Cup
- Appearances: 2 (first in 1993)
- Best result: Champions (1995)

The Ukraine national badminton team (Ukrainian: Збірна України з бадмінтону, romanized: Zbirna Ukrayiny z badmintonu) represents Ukraine in international badminton team competitions. Ukraine participated in the Thomas Cup, the Uber Cup and the Sudirman Cup as part of the Soviet Union. After the abolishment of the USSR in 1991, the Ukrainian Badminton Federation was formed and the national team has been competing under the Ukrainian flag ever since.

In 2022, amidst the Russo-Ukrainian conflict, many national Ukrainian players have fled the country to train in other countries, with some having to train in England at the Milton Keynes National Badminton Centre.

== Competitive record ==
=== Thomas Cup ===
Year	Round	Pos
1949	Part of the Soviet Union	
1952	Part of the Soviet Union	
1955	Part of the Soviet Union	
1958	Part of the Soviet Union	
1961	Part of the Soviet Union	
1964	Part of the Soviet Union	
1967	Part of the Soviet Union	
1970	Part of the Soviet Union	
1973	Part of the Soviet Union	
1976	Part of the Soviet Union	
1979	Part of the Soviet Union	
1982	Part of the Soviet Union	
1984	Part of the Soviet Union	
1986	Part of the Soviet Union	
1988	Part of the Soviet Union	
1990	Part of the Soviet Union	
1992	Did not enter	
1994	Did not enter	
1996	Did not qualify	
1998	Did not qualify	
2000	Did not qualify	
2002	Did not qualify	
2004	Did not qualify	
2006	Did not qualify	
2008	Did not qualify	
2010	Did not qualify	
2012	Did not qualify	
2014	Did not qualify	
2016	Did not qualify	
2018	Did not qualify	
2020	Did not qualify	
2022	Did not qualify	
2024	Did not qualify	
2026	Did not qualify	
2028	TBD	
2030	TBD	

=== Uber Cup ===
Year	Round	Pos
1957	Part of the Soviet Union	
1960	Part of the Soviet Union	
1963	Part of the Soviet Union	
1966	Part of the Soviet Union	
1969	Part of the Soviet Union	
1972	Part of the Soviet Union	
1975	Part of the Soviet Union	
1978	Part of the Soviet Union	
1981	Part of the Soviet Union	
1984	Part of the Soviet Union	
1986	Part of the Soviet Union	
1988	Part of the Soviet Union	
1990	Part of the Soviet Union	
1992	Did not enter	
1994	Did not enter	
1996	Did not qualify	
1998	Did not qualify	
2000	Did not qualify	
2002	Did not qualify	
2004	Did not qualify	
2006	Did not qualify	
2008	Did not qualify	
2010	Did not qualify	
2012	Did not qualify	
2014	Did not qualify	
2016	Did not qualify	
2018	Did not qualify	
2020	Did not qualify	
2022	Did not qualify	
2024	Did not qualify	
2026	Group stage	14th
2028	TBD	
2030	TBD	

=== Sudirman Cup ===
Year	Round	Pos
1989	Part of the Soviet Union	
1991	Part of the Soviet Union	
1993	Group stage	31st
1995	Group stage	27th
1997	Group stage	23rd
1999	Group stage	15th
2001	Group stage	13th
2003	Group stage	13th
2005	Group stage	16th
2007	Group stage	24th
2009	Group stage	19th
2011	Group stage	17th
2013	Group stage	22nd
2015	Did not enter	
2017	Did not enter	
2019	Did not enter	
2021	Did not enter	
2023	Did not qualify	
2025	TBD	
2027	TBD	
2029	TBD	

=== European Team Championships ===
==== Men's team ====
Year	Round	Pos
2004	Quarter-finals	6th
2006	Quarter-finals	8th
2008	Group stage	11th
2010	Fourth place	4th
2012	Quarter-finals	7th
2014	Quarter-finals	5th
2016	Quarter-finals	8th
2018	Group stage	10th
2020	Quarter-finals	5th
2024	Group stage	8th
2026	Did not qualify	
2028	To be determined	
2030	To be determined	

==== Women's team ====
Year	Round	Pos
2004	Group stage	11th
2006	Group stage	10th
2008	Group stage	9th
2010	Group stage	19th
2012	Quarter-finals	6th
2014	Quarter-finals	7th
2016	Quarter-finals	6th
2018	Group stage	10th
2020	Group stage	15th
2024	Did not qualify	
2026	Semi-finals	4th
2028	To be determined	
2030	To be determined	

==== Mixed team ====
Year	Round	Pos
1972	Part of the Soviet Union	
1974	Part of the Soviet Union	
1976	Part of the Soviet Union	
1978	Part of the Soviet Union	
1980	Part of the Soviet Union	
1982	Part of the Soviet Union	
1984	Part of the Soviet Union	
1986	Part of the Soviet Union	
1988	Part of the Soviet Union	
1990	Part of the Soviet Union	
1992	Did not enter	
1994	Group stage	14th
1996	Group stage	9th
1998	Group stage	6th
2000	Group stage	6th
2002	Group stage	6th
2004	Group stage	9th
2006	Group stage	10th
2008	Group stage	8th
2009	Quarter-finals	7th
2011	Group stage	11th
2013	Quarter-finals	6th
2015	Did not qualify	
2017	Did not qualify	
2019	Did not qualify	
2021	Did not qualify	
2023	Group stage	8th
2025	Did not qualify	

=== Helvetia Cup ===
Year	Round	Pos
1962	Part of the Soviet Union	
1963	Part of the Soviet Union	
1964	Part of the Soviet Union	
1965	Part of the Soviet Union	
1966	Part of the Soviet Union	
1967	Part of the Soviet Union	
1968	Part of the Soviet Union	
1969	Part of the Soviet Union	
1970	Part of the Soviet Union	
1971	Part of the Soviet Union	
1973	Part of the Soviet Union	
1975	Part of the Soviet Union	
1977	Part of the Soviet Union	
1979	Part of the Soviet Union	
1981	Part of the Soviet Union	
1983	Part of the Soviet Union	
1985	Part of the Soviet Union	
1987	Part of the Soviet Union	
1989	Part of the Soviet Union	
1991	Part of the Soviet Union	
1993	Fourth place	4th
1995	Champions	1st
1997	Did not enter	
1999	Did not enter	
2001	Did not enter	
2003	Did not enter	
2005	Did not enter	
2007	Did not enter	

=== FISU World University Games ===
==== Mixed team ====
Year	Round	Pos
2007	Did not enter	
2011	Did not enter	
2013	Group stage	13th
2015	Did not enter	
2017	Did not enter	
2021	Group stage	17th
2025	TBD	

=== World University Team Championships ===
==== Mixed team ====
Year	Round	Pos
2008	Did not enter	
2010	Did not enter	
2012	Did not enter	
2014	Did not enter	
2016	Did not enter	
2018	Did not enter	

**Red border color indicates tournament was held on home soil.

== Junior competitive record ==
=== Suhandinata Cup ===
Year	Round	Pos
2000	Did not enter	
2002	Did not enter	
2004	Did not enter	
2006	Group stage	18th
2007	Did not enter	
2008	Did not enter	
2009	Did not enter	
2010	Did not enter	
2011	Did not enter	
2012	Group stage	29th
2013	Did not enter	
2014	Did not enter	
2015	Did not enter	
2016	Group stage	22nd
2017	Did not enter	
2018	Group stage	25th
2019	Did not enter	
2022	Group stage	12th
2023	Did not enter	
2024	TBD	

=== European Junior Team Championships ===
==== Mixed team ====
Year	Round	Pos
1975	Part of the Soviet Union	
1977	Part of the Soviet Union	
1979	Part of the Soviet Union	
1981	Part of the Soviet Union	
1983	Part of the Soviet Union	
1985	Part of the Soviet Union	
1987	Part of the Soviet Union	
1989	Part of the Soviet Union	
1991	Part of the Soviet Union	
1993	Group stage	12th
1995	Group stage	10th
1997	Group stage	9th
1999	Group stage	8th
2001	Group stage	12th
2003	Group stage	12th
2005	Group stage	11th
2007	Group stage	9th
2009	Quarter-finals	7th
2011	Semi-finals	4th
2013	Did not enter	
2015	Group stage	19th
2017	Group stage	21st
2018	Group stage	23rd
2020	Group stage	9th
2022	Semi-finals	3rd
2024	Group stage	

**Red border color indicates tournament was held on home soil.

== Players ==
=== Current squad ===
As of 2 January 2024

==== Men's team ====
Name	DoB/Age	Ranking of event		
Name	DoB/Age	MS	MD	XD
Danylo Bosniuk	23 August 2000 (age 25)	91	1207	702
Oleksandar Shmundyak	25 June 1998 (age 27)	652	1110	-
Glib Beketov	30 October 2000 (age 25)	-	395	-
Mykhaylo Makhnovskiy	19 February 2000 (age 26)	-	395	-
Nikita Yeromenko	7 August 2004 (age 21)	-	279	953
Viacheslav Yakovlev	13 July 2003 (age 22)	522	279	251
Ivan Medynskiy	14 November 2000 (age 25)	1037	705	1160
Oleksii Titov	14 October 2005 (age 20)	1334	1208	1021
Danylo Skrynnik	5 February 2002 (age 24)	1675	-	-
Mykhailo Vyshnevyi	23 August 2004 (age 21)	816	-	-

==== Women's team ====
Name	DoB/Age	Ranking of event		
Name	DoB/Age	WS	WD	XD
Polina Buhrova	30 January 2004 (age 22)	80	-	-
Marija Ulitina	5 November 1991 (age 34)	358	-	-
Anna Mikhalkova	15 March 1997 (age 29)	420	766	1160
Anna Kovalenko	21 June 2006 (age 19)	1102	-	1021
Mariia Stoliarenko	30 April 2004 (age 22)	546	84	702
Yelyzaveta Zharka	14 June 1992 (age 33)	-	84	-
Tetyana Potapenko	22 July 1993 (age 32)	523	502	1021
Polina Tkach	17 March 2003 (age 23)	-	502	251
Yevheniia Kantemyr	4 July 2005 (age 20)	331	-	1261
Maryna Ilyinskaya	13 March 1999 (age 27)	586	-	-

=== Previous squads ===
==== European Team Championships ====
- Men's team: 2020
- Women's team: 2020
