= Iceland national badminton team =

National badminton team representing Iceland

Iceland
- Association: Badmintonsamband Íslands (BSÍ)
- Confederation: BE (Europe)
- President: Kristjan Danielsson

BWF ranking
- Current ranking: 82 ▼3 (2 January 2024)
- Highest ranking: 33 (1 July 2011)

Sudirman Cup
- Appearances: 11 (first in 1991)
- Best result: Group stage

European Mixed Team Championships
- Appearances: 14 (first in 1980)
- Best result: Group stage

European Men's Team Championships
- Appearances: 6 (first in 2006)
- Best result: Group stage

European Women's Team Championships
- Appearances: 6 (first in 2006)
- Best result: Group stage

Helvetia Cup
- Appearances: 13 (first in 1979)
- Best result: Champions (1999, 2007)

The Iceland national badminton team (Icelandic: Landslið Íslands í badminton) represents Iceland in international badminton team competitions. The national team is controlled by the national organization for badminton in Iceland, Badminton Iceland (Icelandic: Badmintonsamband Íslands).

Iceland participated in the European Men's and Women's Team Badminton Championships. Both men's and women's team have never got past the group stage.

== Competitive record ==
The following tables show the Iceland national badminton team's competitive record in international tournaments.

Key

CH	RU	3rd	SF	4th	QF	#R	GS	Q#	#th	A	NH	WDN	DNQ

(CH) champion; (RU) runners-up; (3rd) third place; (SF) semi-finalists; (4th) fourth place; (QF) quarter-finalist; (#R) rounds 4, 3, 2, 1; (#th) places 5, 6...; (GS) group stage; (Q#) qualification round; (A) absent; (NH) not held; (WDN) withdrawn; (DNQ) did not qualify.

=== Thomas Cup ===
Year	1949	1952	1955	1958	1961	1964	1967	1970	1973	1976
Result	A									
Year	1979	1982	1984	1986	1988	1990	1992	1994	1996	1998
Result	A		DNQ							
Year	2000	2002	2004	2006	2008	2010	2012	2014	2016	2018
Result	DNQ								A	DNQ
Year	2020	2022	2024	2026	2028	2030	2032	2034	2036	2038
Result	DNQ	A		DNQ	TBD					

=== Uber Cup ===
Year	1950–1953			1957	1960	1963	1966	1969	1972	1975
Result	NH			A						
Year	1978	1981	1984	1986	1988	1990	1992	1994	1996	1998
Result	A		DNQ							
Year	2000	2002	2004	2006	2008	2010	2012	2014	2016	2018
Result	DNQ								A	DNQ
Year	2020	2022	2024	2026	2028	2030	2032	2034	2036	2038
Result	DNQ	A		DNQ	TBD					

=== Sudirman Cup ===
Year	1989	1991	1993	1995	1997	1999	2001	2003	2005	2007
Result	A	GS	GS	GS	GS	GS	GS	GS	A	GS
Year	2009	2011	2013	2015	2017	2019	2021	2023	2025	2027
Result	GS	GS	A	GS	A					TBD

=== European Team Championships ===
==== Men's team ====
Year	2006	2008	2010	2012	2014	2016	2018	2020	2024	2026
Result	GS	GS	GS	GS	GS	A	GS	GS	DNQ	DNQ
Year	2028	2030	2032	2034	2036	2038	2040	2042	2044	2046
Result	TBD									

==== Women's team ====
Year	2006	2008	2010	2012	2014	2016	2018	2020	2024	2026
Result	GS	GS	GS	GS	GS	A	GS	GS	DNQ	DNQ
Year	2028	2030	2032	2034	2036	2038	2040	2042	2044	2046
Result	TBD									

==== Mixed team ====
Year	1972	1974	1976	1978	1980	1982	1984	1986	1988	1990
Result	A				GS	GS	GS	GS	GS	GS
Year	1992	1994	1996	1998	2000	2002	2004	2006	2008	2009
Result	GS	GS	GS	A	GS	A			GS	GS
Year	2011	2013	2015	2017	2019	2021	2023	2025	2027	2029
Result	GS	GS	DNQ	A	DNQ				TBD	

=== Helvetia Cup ===
Year	1962	1963	1964	1965	1966	1967	1968	1969	1970	1971
Result	A									
Year	1973	1975	1977	1979	1981	1983	1985	1987	1989	1991
Result	A			GS	GS	GS	GS	GS	GS	A
Year	1993	1995	1997	1999	2001	2003	2005	2007	2009	2011
Result	GS	A	GS	CH	GS	GS	GS	CH	NH	

=== Island Games ===
==== Mixed team ====
Year	1985	1987	1989	1991	1993	1995	1997	1999	2001	2003
Result	GS	RU	CH	GS	NH	A		NH	A	
Year	2005	2009	2011	2013	2015	2017	2019	2023	2025	2027
Result	A								TBD	

=== Small States of Europe Team Championships ===
==== Mixed team ====
Year	2023	2024	2025
Result	RU	CH	TBD

**Red border color indicates tournament was held on home soil.

== Junior competitive record ==
=== Suhandinata Cup ===
Year	2000	2002	2004	2006	2007	2008	2009	2010	2011	2012
Result	A									
Year	2013	2014	2015	2016	2017	2018	2019	2022	2023	2024
Result	A		GS	GS	A		GS	GS	GS	A

=== European Junior Team Championships ===
==== Mixed team ====
Year	1975	1977	1979	1981	1983	1985	1987	1989	1991	1993
Result	A			GS	GS	GS	GS	GS	GS	GS
Year	1995	1997	1999	2001	2003	2005	2007	2009	2011	2013
Result	GS	A						GS	GS	GS
Year	2015	2017	2018	2020	2022	2024	2026	2028	2029	2030
Result	GS	A	GS	A			TBD			

=== Finlandia Cup ===
Year	1984	1986	1988	1990	1992	1994	1996	1998	2000	2002	2004	2006
Result	GS	GS	GS	GS	3rd	3rd	GS	GS	GS	GS	GS	GS

**Red border color indicates tournament was held on home soil.

== Players ==
=== Current squad ===
As of 2 January 2024

==== Men's team ====
Name	DoB/Age	Ranking of event		
Name	DoB/Age	MS	MD	XD
Daníel Jóhannesson	26 April 1996 (age 29)	1428	667	409
Gustav Nilsson	13 October 2003 (age 22)	1551	667	402
Davíð Bjarni Björnsson	9 May 1998 (age 27)	-	178	614
Kristófer Darri Finnsson	19 June 1997 (age 28)	-	178	973
Gabriel Ingi Helgason	30 September 2004 (age 21)	1333	717	1358
Róbert Ingi Huldarsson	24 June 1997 (age 28)	1675	1110	1135

==== Women's team ====
Name	DoB/Age	Ranking of event		
Name	DoB/Age	WS	WD	XD
Sigríður Árnadóttir	30 May 1996 (age 29)	947	565	409
Arna Karen Jóhannsdóttir	12 May 1997 (age 28)	-	565	614
Una Hrund Örvar	1 May 2001 (age 24)	-	565	1135
Sólrún Anna Ingvarsdóttir	11 December 1999 (age 26)	834	565	1358
Lilja Bu	6 June 2006 (age 19)	1183	871	1402
Júlíana Karitas Jóhannsdóttir	20 June 2003 (age 22)	1085	871	1402
