= Soviet Union national badminton team =

Former national badminton team representing the Soviet Union

Soviet Union
- Association: USSR Badminton Federation
- Confederation: BE (Europe)

Sudirman Cup
- Appearances: 2 (first in 1989)
- Best result: Group stage

European Mixed Team Championships
- Appearances: 8 (first in 1976)
- Best result: Fourth place (1988, 1990)

Helvetia Cup
- Appearances: 2 (first in 1977)
- Best result: Champions (1977, 1979)

The Soviet Union national badminton team (Russian: Сборная СССР по бадминтону) represented the Soviet Union in international badminton team competitions. The Soviet national team have only participated twice in the international events, namely the Sudirman Cup. The team's last ever competition was the 1991 Sudirman Cup, months before the USSR was dissolved.

Prior to the dissolution, the national team were active in participating in the USSR International badminton tournament, where most of its players have won.

== History ==
=== Mixed team ===
The Soviet team participated in the first Sudirman Cup in 1989. The team were placed in Group 2. They finished in 10th place on the ranking. The Soviet team competed in their final tournament at the 1991 Sudirman Cup in Copenhagen, Denmark. The team was placed into Group 3 with Scotland, Thailand and Canada. The Soviet team won both ties against Scotland and Canada with a tight score of 4-1 and 3-2 respectively. They lost the tie with Thailand and were placed 12th in the rankings.

== Competitive record ==
=== Thomas Cup ===
Year	Round	Pos
1949	Did not enter	
1952	Did not enter	
1955	Did not enter	
1958	Did not enter	
1961	Did not enter	
1964	Did not enter	
1967	Did not enter	
1970	Did not enter	
1973	Did not enter	
1976	Did not enter	
1979	Did not enter	
1982	Did not qualify	
1984
1986	Did not qualify	
1988	Did not qualify	
1990	Did not qualify	

=== Uber Cup ===
Year	Round	Pos
1957	Did not enter	
1960	Did not enter	
1963	Did not enter	
1966	Did not enter	
1969	Did not enter	
1972	Did not enter	
1975	Did not enter	
1978	Did not enter	
1981	Did not qualify	
1984	Did not enter	
1986	Did not enter	
1988	Did not enter	
1990	Did not qualify	

=== Sudirman Cup ===
Year	Round	Pos
1989	Group stage	10th
1991	Group stage	12th

=== European Team Championships ===
==== Mixed team ====
Year	Round	Pos
1972	Did not enter	
1974	Did not enter	
1976	Group stage	7th
1978	Group stage	8th
1980	Group stage	5th
1982	Group stage	5th
1984	Group stage	5th
1986	Group stage	5th
1988	Fourth place	4th
1990	Fourth place	4th

=== Helvetia Cup ===
Year	Round	Pos
1962	Did not enter	
1963	Did not enter	
1964	Did not enter	
1965	Did not enter	
1966	Did not enter	
1967	Did not enter	
1968	Did not enter	
1969	Did not enter	
1970	Did not enter	
1971	Did not enter	
1973	Did not enter	
1975	Did not enter	
1977	Champions	1st
1979	Champions	1st
1981	Did not enter	
1983	Did not enter	
1985	Did not enter	
1987	Did not enter	
1989	Did not enter	
1991	Did not enter	

**Red border color indicates tournament was held on home soil.

== Junior competitive record ==
=== European Junior Team Championships ===
==== Mixed team ====
Year	Round	Pos
1975	Group stage	7th
1977	Group stage	6th
1979	Group stage	5th
1981	Group stage	8th
1983	Group stage	7th
1985	Group stage	7th
1987	Group stage	7th
1989	Group stage	7th
1991	Champions	1st

=== Finlandia Cup ===
==== Mixed team ====
Year	Round	Pos
1984	Did not enter	
1986	Champions	1st
1988	Did not enter	
1990	Did not enter	

**Red border color indicates tournament was held on home soil.

== Players ==
=== Squad ===
As of 1991

==== Men's team ====
Name	DoB/Age	Ranking of event		
Name	DoB/Age	MS	MD	XD
Pavel Uvarov	22 March 1967 (aged 24)	-	-	-
Andrey Antropov	21 May 1967 (aged 24)	-	-	-
Nikolai Zuyev	7 May 1970 (aged 21)	-	-	-
Anatoliy Skripko	14 December 1952 (aged 39)	-	-	-
Vitaliy Shmakov	1961 (aged 29–30)	-	-	-
Sergey Sevryukov	1965 (aged 25–26)	-	-	-

==== Women's team ====
Name	DoB/Age	Ranking of event		
Name	DoB/Age	WS	WD	XD
Elena Rybkina	24 April 1964 (aged 27)	-	-	-
Irina Serova	14 May 1966 (aged 25)	-	-	-
Svetlana Beliasova	10 May 1958 (aged 33)	-	-	-
Viktoria Pron	23 April 1965 (aged 26)	-	-	-
Vlada Chernyavskaya	10 June 1966 (aged 25)	-	-	-
Tatyana Litvinenko	1960 (aged 30–31)	-	-	-
