= France national badminton team =

National badminton team representing France

France
- Nickname(s): Les Bleus (The Blues)
- Association: Fédération Française de Badminton (FFBAD)
- Confederation: BE (Europe)
- President: Yohan Penel

BWF ranking
- Current ranking: 10 (6 October 2026)
- Highest ranking: 10 (4 July 2023)

Sudirman Cup
- Appearances: 16 (first in 1989)
- Best result: Group stage

Thomas Cup
- Appearances: 6 (first in 2014)
- Best result: Runners-up (2026)

Uber Cup
- Appearances: 3 (first in 2018)
- Best result: Group stage

European Mixed Team Championships
- Appearances: 22 (first in 1982)
- Best result: Runners-up (2021, 2023, 2025)

European Men's Team Championships
- Appearances: 8 (first in 2006)
- Best result: Champions (2026)

European Women's Team Championships
- Appearances: 8 (first in 2006)
- Best result: Semi-finals (2020)

Helvetia Cup
- Appearances: 11 (first in 1975)
- Best result: Champions (1997, 2003)

The France national badminton team (French: Équipe de France de badminton) represents France in international badminton team competitions. It is controlled by the French Badminton Federation, France's governing body for badminton. France has had decent results in badminton, having reaching the semifinals in both men's and women's team at the 2020 European Men's and Women's Team Badminton Championships.

The mixed team was runner-up at the 2021 European Mixed Team Badminton Championships. The men's team achieved its best-ever result in 2026, reaching the final of the Thomas Cup in Horsens, Denmark, where they finished as runners-up after a hard-fought match against China.

France also has decent results in badminton at the European Games, having won two silvers and two bronzes.

== Competitive record ==
=== Thomas Cup ===
Year	Round	Pos
1949	Did not qualify	
1952	Did not qualify	
1955	Did not qualify	
1958	Did not qualify	
1961	Did not qualify	
1964	Did not enter	
1967	Did not enter	
1970	Did not enter	
1973	Did not enter	
1976	Did not enter	
1979	Did not enter	
1982	Did not enter	
1984	Did not enter	
1986	Did not qualify	
1988	Did not qualify	
1990	Did not qualify	
1992	Did not qualify	
1994	Did not qualify	
1996	Did not qualify	
1998	Did not qualify	
2000	Did not qualify	
2002	Did not qualify	
2004	Did not qualify	
2006	Did not qualify	
2008	Did not qualify	
2010	Did not qualify	
2012	Did not qualify	
2014	Quarter-finals	5/8
2016	Group stage	11th
2018	Quarter-finals	6th
2020	Group stage	13th
2022	Group stage	10th
2024	Qualified but withdrew	
2026	Runners-up	2nd
2028	To be determined	
2030	To be determined	

=== Uber Cup ===
Year	Round	Pos
1957	Did not enter	
1960	Did not enter	
1963	Did not enter	
1966	Did not enter	
1969	Did not enter	
1972	Did not enter	
1975	Did not enter	
1978	Did not enter	
1981	Did not enter	
1984	Did not enter	
1986	Did not qualify	
1988	Did not qualify	
1990	Did not qualify	
1992	Did not qualify	
1994	Did not qualify	
1996	Did not qualify	
1998	Did not qualify	
2000	Did not qualify	
2002	Did not qualify	
2004	Did not qualify	
2006	Did not qualify	
2008	Did not qualify	
2010	Did not qualify	
2012	Did not qualify	
2014	Did not enter	
2016	Did not qualify	
2018	Group stage	15th
2020	Group stage	12th
2022	Group stage	14th
2024	Qualified but withdrew	
2026	Qualified but withdrew	
2028	To be determined	
2030	To be determined	

=== Sudirman Cup ===
Year	Round	Pos
1989	Group stage	27th
1991	Group stage	29th
1993	Group stage	30th
1995	Group stage	31st
1997	Group stage	33rd
1999	Group stage	31st
2001	Group stage	28th
2003	Group stage	24th
2005	Group stage	25th
2007	Group stage	17th
2009	Group stage	16th
2011	Group stage	14th
2013	Group stage	16th
2015	Group stage	15th
2017	Did not enter	
2019	Group stage	14th
2021	Did not enter	
2023	Group stage	9th
2025	Group stage	12th
2027	To be determined	
2029	To be determined	

=== European Team Championships ===
==== Men's team ====
Year	Round	Pos
2006	Quarter-finals	5/8
2008	Group stage	9/16
2010	Group stage	7/14
2012	Quarter-finals	5/8
2014	Quarter-finals	5/8
2016	Runners-up	2nd
2018	Semi-finals	4th
2020	Semi-finals	3rd
2024	Runners-up	2nd
2026	Champions	1st
2028	Qualified as title holder	
2030	To be determined	

==== Women's team ====
Year	Round	Pos
2006	Quarter-finals	5/7
2008	Quarter-finals	5/7
2010	Group stage	7/12
2012	Quarter-finals	5/8
2014	Quarter-finals	5/8
2016	Group stage	11/15
2018	Quarter-finals	5/8
2020	Semi-finals	3rd
2024	Semi-finals	3rd
2026	Group stage	5/8
2028	To be determined	
2030	To be determined	

==== Mixed team ====
Year	Round	Pos
1972 to 1980	Did not enter	
1982	Group stage	21st
1984	Group stage	18th
1986	Group stage	20th
1988	Group stage	20th
1990	Group stage	21st
1992	Group stage	15th
1994	Group stage	20th
1996	Did not enter	
1998	Group stage	12th
2000	Group stage	10th
2002	Group stage	14th
2004	Group stage	8th
2006	Group stage	6th
2008	Group stage	7th
2009	Quarter-finals	5/8
2011	Quarter-finals	5/8
2013	Quarter-finals	5/8
2015	Quarter-finals	5/8
2017	Quarter-finals	5/8
2019	Quarter-finals	5/6
2021	Runners-up	2nd
2023	Runners-up	2nd
2025	Runners-up	2nd
2027	To be determined	
2029	To be determined	

=== Helvetia Cup ===
Year	Round	Pos
1962	Withdrew	
1963	Did not enter	
1964	Did not enter	
1965	Did not enter	
1966	Did not enter	
1967	Did not enter	
1968	Did not enter	
1969	Did not enter	
1970	Did not enter	
1971	Did not enter	
1973	Did not enter	
1975	Group stage	9th
1977	Did not enter	
1979	Group stage	15th
1981	Group stage	9th
1983	Did not enter	
1985	Group stage	13th
1987	Group stage	11th
1989	Group stage	13th
1991	Group stage	6th
1993	Third place	3rd
1995	Group stage	5th
1997	Champions	1st
1999	Did not enter	
2001	Did not enter	
2003	Champions	1st
2005	Did not enter	
2007	Did not enter	

=== Plume d'Or ===
Year	Round	Pos
1972	Fourth place	4th
1973	Fifth place	5th
1974	Third place	3rd
1976	Third place	3rd
1977	Fourth place	4th
1978	Third place	3rd
1979	Third place	3rd
1980	Fourth place	4th
1981	Fourth place	4th
1982	Group stage	7th
1984	Group stage	5th
1985	Group stage	5th
1986	Group stage	6th
1987	Runners-up	2nd
1988	Champions	1st
1989	Champions	1st
1990	Champions	1st
1991	Champions	1st
1992	Champions	1st
1993	Group stage	5th
1994	Champions	1st

=== FISU World University Games ===
==== Mixed team ====
Year	Round	Pos
2007	Group stage	7/12
2011	Group stage	9/13
2013	Group stage	11th
2015	Group stage	9/16
2017	Group stage	9/16
2021	Group stage	9th
2025	To be determined	

=== World University Team Championships ===
==== Mixed team ====
Year	Round	Pos
2008	Round of 16	8/10
2010	Did not enter	
2012	Did not enter	
2014	Did not enter	
2016	Did not enter	
2018	Did not enter	

**Red border color indicates tournament was held on home soil.

== Junior competitive record ==
=== Suhandinata Cup ===
Year	Round	Pos
2000	Group stage	18th
2002	Did not enter	
2004	Did not enter	
2006	Did not enter	
2007	Did not enter	
2008	Group stage	12th
2009	Group stage	15th
2010	Group stage	13th
2011	Group stage	11th
2012	Group stage	17th
2013	Group stage	12th
2014	Group stage	21st
2015	Group stage	17th
2016	Group stage	11th
2017	Quarter-finals	8th
2018	Group stage	15th
2019	Quarter-finals	8th
2020	Cancelled because of COVID-19 pandemic	
2021	Cancelled because of COVID-19 pandemic	
2022	Did not enter	
2023	Quarter-finals	6th
2024	Group stage	10th
2025	Group stage	13th of 36

=== European Junior Team Championships ===
==== Mixed team ====
Year	Round	Pos
1975	Did not enter	
1977	Did not enter	
1979	Group stage	18th
1981	Group stage	18th
1983	Group stage	17th
1985	Group stage	19th
1987	Group stage	17th
1989	Group stage	16th
1991	Group stage	16th
1993	Group stage	17th
1995	Did not enter	
1997	Group stage	11th
1999	Group stage	10th
2001	Group stage	13th
2003	Group stage	13th
2005	Group stage	8th
2007	Group stage	10th
2009	Quarter-finals	5/7
2011	Group stage	8/14
2013	Runners-up	2nd
2015	Semi-finals	4th
2017	Champions	1st
2018	Champions	1st
2020	Runners-up	2nd
2022	Runners-up	2nd
2024	Runners-up	2nd
2026	Champions	1st

=== Finlandia Cup ===
==== Mixed team ====
Year	Round	Pos
1984	Did not enter	
1986	Did not enter	
1988	Group stage	10th
1990	Third place	3rd
1992	Group stage	8th
1994	Group stage	8th
1996	Runners-up	2nd
1998	Did not enter	
2000	Did not enter	
2002	Did not enter	
2004	Did not enter	
2006	Did not enter	

**Red border color indicates tournament was held on home soil.

== Players ==
=== Current squad ===
As of 2 January 2024

==== Men's team ====
Name	DoB/Age	Ranking of event	
Name	DoB/Age	MS	MD
Christo Popov	8 March 2002 (aged 24)	4	20
Alex Lanier	26 January 2005 (aged 21)	10	
Toma Junior Popov	29 September 1998 (aged 27)	16	20
Éloi Adam	16 March 1999 (aged 27)		50
Léo Rossi	25 December 1999 (aged 26)		50
Maël Cattoen	9 February 2004 (aged 22)		52
Lucas Renoir	7 March 2004 (aged 22)		52
Julien Maio	6 May 1994 (aged 31)		76
William Villeger	22 October 2000 (aged 25)		67
Enogat Roy	5 May 2003 (aged 22)	94	

==== Women's team ====
Name	DoB/Age	Ranking of event		
Name	DoB/Age	WS	WD	XD
Qi Xuefei	28 February 1992 (age 34)	58	-	-
Léonice Huet	21 May 2000 (age 26)	79	-	-
Rosy Oktavia Pancasari	1 October 1995 (age 31)	83	-	-
Romane Cloteaux-Foucault	25 January 2001 (age 25)	127	589	-
Anna Tatranova	12 October 2003 (age 23)	118	-	740
Margot Lambert	15 March 1999 (age 27)	-	22	-
Anne Tran	27 April 1996 (age 30)	-	22	-
Sharone Bauer	12 April 2000 (age 26)	-	80	101
Emilie Vercelot	5 February 2002 (age 24)	-	80	104
Delphine Delrue	6 November 1998 (age 28)	-	499	11
