= Yugoslavia national badminton team =

National badminton team

Yugoslavia
- Association: Badminton Savez Jugoslavije (BSJ)
- Confederation: BE (Europe)

European Mixed Team Championships
- Appearances: 4 (first in 1972)
- Best result: Group stage

Helvetia Cup
- Appearances: 3 (first in 1973)
- Best result: Runners-up (1975)

The Yugoslavia national badminton team (Serbo-Croatian: Jugoslovanska reprezentacija v badmintonu; Репрезентација Југославије у бадминтону) represented Yugoslavia in international badminton team competitions. It was managed by the Badminton Federation of Yugoslavia, also known as Badmintonska Savez Jugoslavije. The national team competed in the Helvetia Cup two times and were runners-up in 1975.

The Yugoslavian junior team competed in the European Junior Badminton Championships 3 times before the dissolution of Yugoslavia. Lučka Križman was the only Yugoslavian badminton player to medal at any international badminton event.

== History ==
Badminton was first played in Yugoslavia in the 1950s. At the time, the sport was widely played by Yugoslavians of Slovenian ethnicity in cities, including Ljubljana.

=== Mixed team ===
Yugoslavia sent its team to compete in their first international team tournament at the 1972 European Mixed Team Badminton Championships. The team finished in 11th place. The Yugoslavian team then competed in the 1973 Helvetia Cup and finished in fourth place after losing the third place match to Austria. Two years later, the Yugoslavian mixed team came back stronger to win against Austria whom they lost against last time and entered the finals of the 1975 Helvetia Cup. The team then lost 3–2 to Norway in the final.

== Competitive record ==
=== Thomas Cup ===
| Year | Round | Pos |
|---|---|---|
| 1949 to 1990 | Did not enter | |

=== Uber Cup ===
| Year | Round | Pos |
|---|---|---|
| 1957 to 1990 | Did not enter | |

=== Sudirman Cup ===
| Year | Round | Pos |
|---|---|---|
| 1989 | Did not enter | |
| 1991 | Did not enter | |

=== European Team Championships ===
==== Mixed team ====
| Year | Round | Pos |
|---|---|---|
| 1972 | Group stage | 11th |
| 1974 | Group stage | 11th |
| 1976 | Did not enter | |
| 1978 | Did not enter | |
| 1980 | Group stage | 16th |
| 1982 | Group stage | 19th |
| 1984 | Did not enter | |
| 1986 | Did not enter | |
| 1988 | Did not enter | |
| 1990 | Did not enter | |

=== Helvetia Cup ===
| Year | Round | Pos |
|---|---|---|
| 1962 to 1971 | Did not enter | |
| 1973 | Fourth place | 4th |
| 1975 | Runners-up | 2nd |
| 1977 | Did not enter | |
| 1979 | Quarter-finals | 8th |
| 1981 | Did not enter | |
| 1983 | Did not enter | |
| 1985 | Did not enter | |
| 1987 | Did not enter | |
| 1989 | Did not enter | |
| 1991 | Did not enter | |

=== Plume d'Or ===
| Year | Round | Pos |
|---|---|---|
| 1972 to 1976 | Did not enter | |
| 1977 | Champions | 1st |
| 1978 | Champions | 1st |
| 1979 | Did not enter | |
| 1980 | Runners-up | 2nd |
| 1981 | Runners-up | 2nd |
| 1982 | Runners-up | 2nd |
| 1984 | Did not enter | |
| 1985 | Did not enter | |
| 1986 | Did not enter | |
| 1987 | Did not enter | |
| 1988 | Did not enter | |
| 1989 | Did not enter | |
| 1990 | Did not enter | |
| 1991 | Did not enter | |

**Red border color indicates tournament was held on home soil.

== Junior competitive record ==
=== European Junior Team Championships ===
==== Mixed team ====
| Year | Round | Pos |
|---|---|---|
| 1975 | Did not enter | |
| 1977 | Did not enter | |
| 1979 | Group stage | 14th |
| 1981 | Did not enter | |
| 1983 | Did not enter | |
| 1985 | Group stage | 23rd |
| 1987 | Did not enter | |
| 1989 | Did not enter | |
| 1991 | Group stage | 25th |

=== Finlandia Cup ===
==== Mixed team ====
| Year | Round | Pos |
|---|---|---|
| 1984 | Did not enter | |
| 1986 | Did not enter | |
| 1988 | Did not enter | |
| 1990 | Group stage | 17th |

**Red border color indicates tournament was held on home soil.

== Players ==
=== Squad ===
As of 1975 Helvetia Cup

==== Men's team ====
| Name | DoB/Age | Ranking of event | | |
| Name | DoB/Age | MS | MD | XD |
|---|---|---|---|---|
| Gregor Berden | 1951 (aged 25) | - | - | - |
| Stane Koprivšek | 1952 (aged 24) | - | - | - |
| Jani Čaleta | 1948 (aged 27) | - | - | - |
| Slavko Županič | 1943 (aged 32) | - | - | - |
| Mitja Žorga | 1942 (aged 33) | - | - | - |
| Jani Drinovec | 1936 (aged 39) | - | - | - |
| Oki Drinovec | 1934 (aged 41) | - | - | - |
| Danče Pohar | 1940 (aged 35) | - | - | - |

==== Women's team ====
| Name | DoB/Age | Ranking of event | | |
| Name | DoB/Age | WS | WD | XD |
|---|---|---|---|---|
| Lučka Križman | 1952 (aged 24) | - | - | - |
| Meta Bogel | 1935 (aged 40) | - | - | - |
| Mariča Amf | 1934 (aged 41) | - | - | - |
| Breda Križman | 1940 (aged 35) | - | - | - |
| Vita Bohinc | 1949 (aged 28) | - | - | - |
| Marta Amf | 1948 (aged 29) | - | - | - |
| Maja Atanasijević | 1953 (aged 23) | - | - | - |
| Mateja Strmole | 1953 (aged 23) | - | - | - |
