= Linda Gardner =

Scottish international badminton player

Personal information
- Nationality: British (Scottish)
- Born: c.1958

Sport
- Sport: Badminton
- Club: Netherlee, Glasgow

Linda Gardner (born c.1958) is a former international badminton player from Scotland who competed at the Commonwealth Games.

== Biography ==
Gardner was based in Netherlee, in Glasgow and represented Scotland at international level, gaining her first international cap in February 1981.

Gardner represented the Scottish team at the 1982 Commonwealth Games in Brisbane, Australia, where she competed in the singles and women's doubles events, the latter with Christine Heatly.

In 1983 Gardner, teamed up with Pamela Hamilton to form a new doubles partnership.
