= 2008 European Mixed Team Badminton Championships =

Tournament details
- Dates: 12-15 April 2008
- Venue: Messecenter Herning
- Location: Herning, Denmark

The 2008 European Mixed Team Badminton Championships were held in Herning, Denmark, from April 12 to April 15, and were organised by the Badminton Europe and the Danmarks Badminton Forbund.

The competition was followed by the 2008 European Badminton Championships, the singles competition, held between April 16 and April 19.

== Medalists ==
Event	Gold	Silver	Bronze
Mixed Team	Denmark	England	Poland

== Results ==
=== Groups ===
==== Group A ====
Team	Pts	Pld	W	L	MF	MA	MD
Denmark	3	3	3	0	14	1	+13
Russia	2	3	2	1	8	7	+1
Scotland	1	3	1	2	6	9	−3
Estonia	0	3	0	3	2	13	−11

==== Group B ====
Team	Pts	Pld	W	L	MF	MA	MD
Netherlands	3	3	3	0	13	2	+11
Ukraine	2	3	2	1	8	7	+1
Sweden	1	3	1	2	6	9	−3
Ireland	0	3	0	3	3	12	−9

==== Group C ====
Team	Pts	Pld	W	L	MF	MA	MD
England	3	3	3	0	13	2	+11
France	2	3	2	1	9	6	+3
Czech Republic	1	3	1	2	6	9	−3
Iceland	0	3	0	3	2	13	−11

==== Group D ====
Team	Pts	Pld	W	L	MF	MA	MD
Poland	3	3	3	0	9	6	+3
Germany	2	3	2	1	12	3	+9
Bulgaria	1	3	1	2	6	9	−3
Finland	0	3	0	3	3	12	−9

=== Knockout stage ===
Semi-finals
April 14
Denmark	3
Netherlands	0
April 14
Poland	0
England	3

Final
April 15
Denmark	3
England	0
Third place
April 15
Netherlands	1
Poland	3

==== Final ====
Denmark
3
Herning, Denmark
April 15, 2008

England
0

			1	2	3
1	(Denmark) (England)	Thomas Laybourn / Kamilla Rytter Juhl; Anthony Clark / Donna Kellogg	21; 15	22; 24	21; 19
2	(Denmark) (England)	Joachim Persson; Andrew Smith	21; 13	26; 24
3	(Denmark) (England)	Tine Rasmussen; Tracey Hallam	21; 13	21; 8
