= 1979 Helvetia Cup =

Badminton event

1979 Helvetia Cup Helvetia-Cup 1979
Tournament details
- Dates: 27 January
- Edition: 14
- Venue: St. Ruprecht Sports Hall
- Location: Klagenfurt, Austria

The 1979 Helvetia Cup was the fourteenth edition of the Helvetia Cup mixed team badminton tournament. This was the third time Austria had hosted the Cup. The Soviet Union won the title for a second consecutive time after defeating Ireland, Norway and Wales in their group.

== Tournament ==
The 1979 Helvetia Cup was scheduled to be held on 27 January 1979. The participating countries were increased from 11 to 17. Due to the number of countries competing in the event, the competition format was changed to a division format. Five teams made their debut in the competition, which were Iceland, Italy, Malta, Poland and Portugal.

=== Venue ===
This tournament was held at the St. Ruprecht Sports Hall in Klagenfurt, Austria.

=== Draw ===
Seventeen teams were divided into groups of 4, which are Group 1, Group 2, Group 3 and Group 4. Group 4 is divided into Subgroup A and B. The teams in Group 4 will compete in the classification play-offs after finishing the subgroup round.

Group 1	Group 2	Group 3	Group 4
Ireland; Norway; Soviet Union; Wales	Austria; Czechoslovakia; Hungary; Yugoslavia	Finland; Poland; Belgium; Portugal	Subgroup A Iceland; France Subgroup B Italy; Malta; Switzerland

== Group stage ==
All times are Central European Time (UTC+01:00).

=== Group 1 ===
Pos	Team	Pld	W	L	MF	MA	MD	Pts	Qualification
1	Soviet Union	3	3	0	19	2	+17	3	Champions
2	Ireland	3	2	1	12	9	+3	2	Runners-up
3	Norway	3	1	2	7	14	−7	1	Third place
4	Wales	3	0	3	4	17	−13	0	Fourth place

Source: e-newspaperarchives.ch

27 January 1979

Ireland	5–2	Norway

St. Ruprecht Sports Hall, Austria

27 January 1979

Soviet Union	7–0	Wales

St. Ruprecht Sports Hall, Austria

27 January 1979

Ireland	6–1	Wales

St. Ruprecht Sports Hall, Austria

27 January 1979

Soviet Union	6–1	Norway

St. Ruprecht Sports Hall, Austria

27 January 1979

Norway	4–3	Wales

St. Ruprecht Sports Hall, Austria

27 January 1979

Soviet Union	6–1	Ireland

St. Ruprecht Sports Hall, Austria

=== Group 2 ===
Pos	Team	Pld	W	L	MF	MA	MD	Pts	Qualification
1	Czechoslovakia	3	3	0	17	4	+13	3	Fifth place
2	Hungary	3	2	1	9	12	−3	2	Sixth place
3	Austria (H)	3	1	2	11	10	+1	1	Seventh place
4	Yugoslavia	3	0	3	5	16	−11	0	Eighth place

Source: e-newspaperarchives.ch
(H) Host

27 January 1979

Austria	3–4	Hungary

St. Ruprecht Sports Hall, Austria

27 January 1979

Czechoslovakia	6–1	Yugoslavia

St. Ruprecht Sports Hall, Austria

27 January 1979

Czechoslovakia	6–1	Hungary

St. Ruprecht Sports Hall, Austria

27 January 1979

Austria	6–1	Yugoslavia

St. Ruprecht Sports Hall, Austria

27 January 1979

Czechoslovakia	5–2	Austria

St. Ruprecht Sports Hall, Austria

27 January 1979

Hungary	4–3	Yugoslavia

St. Ruprecht Sports Hall, Austria

=== Group 3 ===
Pos	Team	Pld	W	L	MF	MA	MD	Pts	Qualification
1	Finland	3	3	0	16	5	+11	3	Ninth place
2	Poland	3	2	1	14	7	+7	2	Tenth place
3	Belgium	3	1	2	11	10	+1	1	Eleventh place
4	Portugal	3	0	3	1	20	−19	0	Twelfth place

Source: e-newspaperarchives.ch

27 January 1979

Finland	7–0	Portugal

St. Ruprecht Sports Hall, Austria

27 January 1979

Belgium	2–5	Poland

St. Ruprecht Sports Hall, Austria

27 January 1979

Finland	4–3	Belgium

St. Ruprecht Sports Hall, Austria

27 January 1979

Poland	7–0	Portugal

St. Ruprecht Sports Hall, Austria

27 January 1979

Finland	5–2	Poland

St. Ruprecht Sports Hall, Austria

27 January 1979

Belgium	6–1	Portugal

St. Ruprecht Sports Hall, Austria

=== Group 4 ===
==== Subgroup A ====
Pos	Team	Pld	W	L	MF	MA	MD	Pts	Qualification
1	Iceland	2	1	0	5	2	+3	1	13th–14th place
2	France	2	0	1	2	5	−3	0	15th–16th place

Source: e-newspaperarchives.ch

27 January 1979

France	2–5	Iceland

St. Ruprecht Sports Hall, Austria

==== Subgroup B ====
Pos	Team	Pld	W	L	MF	MA	MD	Pts	Qualification
1	Switzerland	2	2	0	12	2	+10	2	13th–14th place
2	Malta	2	1	1	5	9	−4	1	15th–16th place
3	Italy	2	0	2	4	10	−6	0	17th place

Source: e-newspaperarchives.ch

27 January 1979

Switzerland	6–1	Malta

St. Ruprecht Sports Hall, Austria

27 January 1979

Switzerland	7–0	Italy

St. Ruprecht Sports Hall, Austria

27 January 1979

Malta	7–0	Italy

St. Ruprecht Sports Hall, Austria

=== 13th–14th place ===
Pos	Team	Pld	W	L	MF	MA	MD	Pts	Qualification
1	Switzerland	2	1	0	5	2	+3	1	Thirteenth place
2	Iceland	2	0	1	2	5	−3	0	Fourteenth place

Source: e-newspaperarchives.ch

27 January 1979

Switzerland	5–2	Iceland
Report

St. Ruprecht Sports Hall, Austria

=== 15th–16th place ===
Pos	Team	Pld	W	L	MF	MA	MD	Pts	Qualification
1	France	2	1	0	4	3	+1	1	Fifteenth place
2	Malta	2	0	1	3	4	−1	0	Sixteenth place

Source: e-newspaperarchives.ch

27 January 1979

France	4–3	Malta
Report

St. Ruprecht Sports Hall, Austria

1979 Helvetia Cup winner

Soviet Union
Second title

== Final ranking ==
Pos	Team	Pld	W	L	Pts	MD	Final result
1st place, gold medalist(s)	Soviet Union	3	3	0	3	+17	Champions
2nd place, silver medalist(s)	Ireland	3	2	1	2	+3	Runners-up
3rd place, bronze medalist(s)	Norway	3	1	2	1	−7	Third place
4	Wales	3	0	3	0	−13	Fourth place
5	Czechoslovakia	3	3	0	3	+13	Group 2
6	Hungary	3	2	1	2	−3	Group 2
7	Austria (H)	3	1	2	1	+1	Group 2
8	Yugoslavia	3	0	3	0	−11	Group 2
9	Finland	3	3	0	3	+11	Group 3
10	Poland	3	2	1	2	+7	Group 3
11	Belgium	3	1	2	1	+1	Group 3
12	Portugal	3	0	3	0	−19	Group 3
13	Switzerland	3	3	0	3	+11	Group 4
14	Iceland	2	1	1	1	+2	Group 4
15	France	2	1	1	1	−4	Group 4
16	Malta	3	1	2	1	−5	Group 4
17	Italy	2	0	2	0	−6	Group 4
