= 2024 European Junior Badminton Championships =

Tournament details
- Dates: 26 November – 5 December 2024
- Venue: Poliesportiu Sa Blanca Dona
- Location: Ibiza, Spain

The 2024 European Junior Badminton Championships was the 29th edition of the European Junior Badminton Championships. The championships were held at the Poliesportiu Sa Blanca Dona in Ibiza, Spain, from 26 November to 5 December 2024 to crown the best U-19 badminton players in Europe.

== Tournament ==
The 2024 European Junior Badminton Championships was organized by Badminton Europe and consisted of the mixed team event and the individual event. 30 teams took part in the mixed team event which was held from 26 to 30 November.

=== Venue ===
The tournament was held at Poliesportiu Sa Blanca Dona in Ibiza, Spain.

== Medal summary ==
=== Medalists ===
Event	Gold	Silver	Bronze
Teams	Denmark; Philip Kryger Boe; Jesper Østergaard Christensen; Robert Nebel; Simon Rasmussen; Otto Reiler; Salomon Adam Thomasen; Caroline Mouritsen; Anna-Sofie Nielsen; Amanda Aarrebo Petersen; Maria Højlund Tommerup; Kajsa van Dalm; Marie Viscovich	France; Arthur Chardain; Thibault Gardon; Ewan Goulin; Tom Lalot Trescarte; Nathan Nguyen; Arsène Serre; Arthur Tatranov; Agathe Cuevas; Kahtell Desmots-Chacun; Carla Dubois; Malya Hoareau; Elsa Jacob; Elena Phan; Camille Pognante	Netherlands; Mats Duwel; Dion Hoegen; Vihaan Shah; Casper Spaans; Joep Strooper; Sterre Bang; Mandy Duijndam; Inger Pothuizen; Flora Wang; Anissa Wongsodimedjo
Teams	Denmark; Philip Kryger Boe; Jesper Østergaard Christensen; Robert Nebel; Simon Rasmussen; Otto Reiler; Salomon Adam Thomasen; Caroline Mouritsen; Anna-Sofie Nielsen; Amanda Aarrebo Petersen; Maria Højlund Tommerup; Kajsa van Dalm; Marie Viscovich	France; Arthur Chardain; Thibault Gardon; Ewan Goulin; Tom Lalot Trescarte; Nathan Nguyen; Arsène Serre; Arthur Tatranov; Agathe Cuevas; Kahtell Desmots-Chacun; Carla Dubois; Malya Hoareau; Elsa Jacob; Elena Phan; Camille Pognante	Poland; Mateusz Golas; Paweł Kiszczyk; Mikołaj Morawski; Damian Perkowski; Krzysztof Podkowiński; Bartosz Puńko; Maja Janko; Lena Makowska; Kinga Stokfisz; Alicja Syrek; Olga Szwarnowiecka; Kaja Ziółkowska
Boys' singles	(Poland) Mateusz Golas	(France) Arthur Tatranov	(Portugal) Tiago Berenguer
Boys' singles	(Poland) Mateusz Golas	(France) Arthur Tatranov	(Scotland) Matthew Waring
Girls' singles	(Bulgaria) Kaloyana Nalbantova	(Turkey) Avza Bodur	(Republic of Ireland) Siofra Flynn
Girls' singles	(Bulgaria) Kaloyana Nalbantova	(Turkey) Avza Bodur	(Czech Republic) Lucie Krulová
Boys' doubles	(France) Thibault Gardon (France) Tom Lalot Trescarte	(Denmark) Robert Nebel (Denmark) Otto Reiler	(Denmark) Phillip Kryger Boe (Denmark) Jesper Østergaard Christensen
Boys' doubles	(France) Thibault Gardon (France) Tom Lalot Trescarte	(Denmark) Robert Nebel (Denmark) Otto Reiler	(Germany) Danial Marzuan (Germany) Mark Niemann
Girls' doubles	(France) Elsa Jacob (France) Camille Pognante	(Denmark) Amanda Aarrebo Petersen (Denmark) Maria Højlund Tommerup	(Spain) Macarena Izquierdo (Spain) Carmen María Jiménez
Girls' doubles	(France) Elsa Jacob (France) Camille Pognante	(Denmark) Amanda Aarrebo Petersen (Denmark) Maria Højlund Tommerup	(Germany) Shreya Hochscheid (Germany) Marie Sophie Stern
Mixed doubles	(France) Thibault Gardon (France) Kathell Desmots-Chacun	(Denmark) Otto Reiler (Denmark) Amanda Aarrebo Petersen	(Turkey) Buğra Aktaş (Turkey) Sinem Yıldız
Mixed doubles	(France) Thibault Gardon (France) Kathell Desmots-Chacun	(Denmark) Otto Reiler (Denmark) Amanda Aarrebo Petersen	(Spain) Adolfo López (Spain) Carmen María Jiménez

=== Medal table ===
* Host nation (Spain)

Rank	Nation	Gold	Silver	Bronze	Total
1	France	3	2	0	5
2	Denmark	1	3	1	5
3	Poland	1	0	1	2
4	Bulgaria	1	0	0	1
5	Turkey	0	1	1	2
6	Germany	0	0	2	2
6	Spain*	0	0	2	2
8	Czech Republic	0	0	1	1
8	Ireland	0	0	1	1
8	Netherlands	0	0	1	1
8	Portugal	0	0	1	1
8	Scotland	0	0	1	1
Totals (12 entries)		6	6	12	24
