= 1964 Helvetia Cup =

Badminton event

1964 Helvetia Cup Helvetia-Beker 1964
Tournament details
- Dates: 1 – 2 May
- Edition: 3
- Venue: Duinwijck Badminton Hall
- Location: Haarlem, Netherlands

The 1964 Helvetia Cup was the third edition of the Helvetia Cup mixed team badminton tournament. After the finals of the 1963 Helvetia Cup, the president of the German Badminton Association, Hubert Brohl announced that the next Helvetia Cup would be held in Haarlem.

Defending champions West Germany completed a hat-trick by winning the Helvetia Cup for a third consecutive time, defeating Belgium in the final. In the playoff for third place, the Netherlands defeated Austria 5–3.

== Tournament ==
The 1964 Helvetia Cup was scheduled to be held from 1 to 2 May 1964 with the participation of five countries in the Central European region, which were Austria, Belgium, the Netherlands, Switzerland and West Germany.

=== Venue ===
This tournament was held at the Duinwijck Badminton Hall in Haarlem, Netherlands.

=== Draw ===
The draw was announced on 30 April 1964. The group stage consists of 2 groups, Group 1 and Group 2.

Group 1	Group 2
West Germany; Netherlands	Belgium; Austria; Switzerland

== Group stage ==
All times are Central European Time (UTC+01:00).

=== Group 1 ===
Pos	Team	Pld	W	L	MF	MA	MD	Pts	Qualification
1	West Germany	2	1	0	5	3	+2	1	Final
2	Netherlands (H)	2	0	1	3	5	−2	0	3rd–4th place

Source: Delpher
(H) Host

1 May 1964

West Germany	5–3	Netherlands
Report

Duinwijck Badminton Hall, Netherlands

=== Group 2 ===
Pos	Team	Pld	W	L	MF	MA	MD	Pts	Qualification
1	Belgium	2	2	0	14	2	+12	2	Final
2	Austria	2	1	1	9	7	+2	1	3rd–4th place
3	Switzerland	2	0	2	1	15	−14	0	

Source: Delpher

1 May 1964

Belgium	6–2	Austria
Report

Duinwijck Badminton Hall, Netherlands

1 May 1964

Belgium	8–0	Switzerland
Report

Duinwijck Badminton Hall, Netherlands

1 May 1964

Austria	7–1	Switzerland
Report

Duinwijck Badminton Hall, Netherlands

== Classification round ==
=== 3rd–4th place ===
Netherlands
5
Duinwijck Badminton Hall
2 May 1964

Austria
3

			1	2	3
1	(Netherlands) (Austria)	Herman Leidelmeijer; Reinhold Pum
2	(Netherlands) (Austria)	Cees Broedelet; Heinz Ottmann
3	(Netherlands) (Austria)	Lex Meijer; Siegfried Jost
4	(Netherlands) (Austria)	Marloes van Swelm; Hilde Taupe
5	(Netherlands) (Austria)	Vic Leunissen / Henk Weys; Hermann Fröhlich / Reinhold Pum
6	(Netherlands) (Austria)	Hans Sweep / Jo van der Sluys; Bernd Frohnwieser / Heinz Ottmann
7	(Netherlands) (Austria)	Marja Ridder / Imre Rietveld; Hilde Taupe / Hilde Themel
8	(Netherlands) (Austria)	Lex Meijer / Marloes van Swelm; Hermann Fröhlich / Lore Voit

=== Final ===
West Germany
7
Duinwijck Badminton Hall
2 May 1964

Belgium
1

			1	2	3
1	(West Germany) (Belgium)	Franz Beinvogl; Anton Verstoep	15; 2	15; 2
2	(West Germany) (Belgium)	Kurt Jendroska; Roger van Meerbeek	15; 9	15; 7
3	(West Germany) (Belgium)	Detlef Eggers; Guy van Branteghem	18; 13	15; 9
4	(West Germany) (Belgium)	Heidi Menacher; June van der Willigen	11; 8	11; 2
5	(West Germany) (Belgium)	Franz Beinvogl / Siegfried Betz; Herman Moens / Roger van Meerbeek	15; 8	15; 10
6	(West Germany) (Belgium)	Kurt Jendroska / Detlef Eggers; Bella Rudas / Jack Stuart	15; 10	15; 6
7	(West Germany) (Belgium)	Marlies Langenbrink / Heidi Menacher; June van der Willigen / Bep Verstoep	7; 15	15; 3	18; 15
8	(West Germany) (Belgium)	Siegfried Betz / Marlies Langenbrink; Herman Moens / Bep Verstoep	9; 15	10; 15

1964 Helvetia Cup winner

West Germany
Third title

== Final ranking ==
Pos	Team	Pld	W	L	Pts	MD	Final result
1st place, gold medalist(s)	West Germany	2	2	0	2	+8	Champions
2nd place, silver medalist(s)	Belgium	3	2	1	2	+6	Runners-up
3rd place, bronze medalist(s)	Netherlands	2	1	1	1	0	Third place
4	Austria	3	1	2	1	0	Fourth place
5	Switzerland (H)	2	0	2	0	−14	Eliminated in group stage
