= 1975 Helvetia Cup =

Badminton event

1975 Helvetia Cup Helvetia-Beker 1975 Helvetia-Cup 1975 Coupe Helvétia 1975
Tournament details
- Dates: 26 – 27 April
- Edition: 12
- Venue: St. Ursula Institute Sports Hall
- Location: Antwerp, Belgium

The 1975 Helvetia Cup was the twelfth edition of the Helvetia Cup mixed team badminton tournament. This was the second time Belgium have hosted the tournament after Brussels in 1966. Czechoslovakia could not defend their title after the team declined participation for the tournament.

Norway made history after winning the tournament for the first time, beating Yugoslavia and Austria in the final stage. Yugoslavia also made history by reaching their first ever final in the Cup since their debut two years prior.

== Tournament ==
The 1975 Helvetia Cup was scheduled to be held from 26 to 27 April 1975 with nine countries participating in the tournament. France made their first appearance in the Cup since the team's withdrawal in 1962. Czechoslovakia were unable to field a team for the tournament, therefore the team did not participate. Portugal were initially due to make their debut in the tournament but later withdrew.

=== Venue ===
This tournament was held at the St. Ursula Institute Sports Hall in Wilrijk, Antwerp, Belgium.

=== Draw ===
The group stage consists of 3 groups, Group 1, Group 2 and Group 3.

| Group 1 | Group 2 | Group 3 |
|---|---|---|
| Austria; Belgium; Switzerland | Finland; Ireland; Norway | France; Wales; Yugoslavia |

== Group stage ==
All times are Central European Time (UTC+01:00).

=== Group 1 ===
| Pos | Team | Pld | W | L | MF | MA | MD | Pts | Qualification |
|---|---|---|---|---|---|---|---|---|---|
| 1 | Austria | 2 | 2 | 0 | 8 | 6 | +2 | 2 | Final |
| 2 | Belgium (H) | 2 | 1 | 1 | 8 | 6 | +2 | 1 | 4th–6th place |
| 3 | Switzerland | 2 | 0 | 2 | 5 | 9 | −4 | 0 | 7th–9th place |

Source: National Library of Norway
(H) Host

26 April 1975

| Austria | 4–3 | Switzerland |

St. Ursula Institute Sports Hall, Belgium

26 April 1975

| Belgium | 5–2 | Switzerland |

St. Ursula Institute Sports Hall, Belgium

26 April 1975

| Austria | 4–3 | Belgium |

St. Ursula Institute Sports Hall, Belgium

=== Group 2 ===
| Pos | Team | Pld | W | L | MF | MA | MD | Pts | Qualification |
|---|---|---|---|---|---|---|---|---|---|
| 1 | Norway | 2 | 2 | 0 | 10 | 4 | +6 | 2 | Final |
| 2 | Ireland | 2 | 1 | 1 | 8 | 6 | +2 | 1 | 4th–6th place |
| 3 | Finland | 2 | 0 | 2 | 3 | 11 | −8 | 0 | 7th–9th place |

Source: National Library of Norway

26 April 1975

| Norway | 5–2 | Finland |

St. Ursula Institute Sports Hall, Belgium

26 April 1975

| Ireland | 6–1 | Finland |

St. Ursula Institute Sports Hall, Belgium

26 April 1975

| Norway | 5–2 | Ireland |

St. Ursula Institute Sports Hall, Belgium

=== Group 3 ===
| Pos | Team | Pld | W | L | MF | MA | MD | Pts | Qualification |
|---|---|---|---|---|---|---|---|---|---|
| 1 | Yugoslavia | 2 | 2 | 0 | 10 | 4 | +6 | 2 | Final |
| 2 | Wales | 2 | 1 | 1 | 10 | 4 | +6 | 1 | 4th–6th place |
| 3 | France | 2 | 0 | 2 | 1 | 13 | −12 | 0 | 7th–9th place |

Source: National Library of Norway

26 April 1975

| Yugoslavia | 6–1 | France |

St. Ursula Institute Sports Hall, Belgium

26 April 1975

| Wales | 7–0 | France |

St. Ursula Institute Sports Hall, Belgium

26 April 1975

| Yugoslavia | 4–3 | Wales |

St. Ursula Institute Sports Hall, Belgium

== Classification round ==
=== 7th–9th place ===
| Pos | Team | Pld | W | L | MF | MA | MD | Pts | Qualification |
|---|---|---|---|---|---|---|---|---|---|
| 1 | Switzerland | 2 | 2 | 0 | 10 | 4 | +6 | 2 | Seventh place |
| 2 | Finland | 2 | 1 | 1 | 9 | 5 | +4 | 1 | Eighth place |
| 3 | France | 2 | 0 | 2 | 2 | 12 | −10 | 0 | Ninth place |

Source: National Library of Norway

27 April 1975

| Switzerland | 6–1 | France |

St. Ursula Institute Sports Hall, Belgium

27 April 1975

| Finland | 6–1 | France |

St. Ursula Institute Sports Hall, Belgium

27 April 1975

| Switzerland | 4–3 | Finland |

St. Ursula Institute Sports Hall, Belgium

=== 4th–6th place ===
| Pos | Team | Pld | W | L | MF | MA | MD | Pts | Qualification |
|---|---|---|---|---|---|---|---|---|---|
| 1 | Ireland | 2 | 2 | 0 | 9 | 5 | +4 | 2 | Fourth place |
| 2 | Wales | 2 | 1 | 1 | 6 | 8 | −2 | 1 | Fifth place |
| 3 | Belgium (H) | 2 | 0 | 2 | 6 | 8 | −2 | 0 | Sixth place |

Source: National Library of Norway
(H) Host

27 April 1975

| Wales | 2–5 | Ireland |

St. Ursula Institute Sports Hall, Belgium

27 April 1975

| Belgium | 3–4 | Ireland |

St. Ursula Institute Sports Hall, Belgium

27 April 1975

| Wales | 4–3 | Belgium |

St. Ursula Institute Sports Hall, Belgium

== Final ==
=== Round robin ===
| Pos | Team | Pld | W | L | MF | MA | MD | Pts | Qualification |
|---|---|---|---|---|---|---|---|---|---|
| 1 | Norway | 2 | 2 | 0 | 10 | 4 | +6 | 2 | Champions |
| 2 | Yugoslavia | 2 | 1 | 1 | 6 | 8 | −2 | 1 | Runners-up |
| 3 | Austria | 2 | 0 | 2 | 5 | 9 | −4 | 0 | Third place |

Source: National Library of Norway

27 April 1975

| Norway | 6–1 | Yugoslavia |
Report

St. Ursula Institute Sports Hall, Belgium

27 April 1975

| Austria | 2–5 | Yugoslavia |
Report

St. Ursula Institute Sports Hall, Belgium

27 April 1975

| Norway | 4–3 | Austria |
Report

St. Ursula Institute Sports Hall, Belgium

1975 Helvetia Cup winner

Norway
First title

== Final ranking ==
| Pos | Team | Pld | W | L | Pts | MD | Final result |
|---|---|---|---|---|---|---|---|
| 1st place, gold medalist(s) | Norway | 4 | 4 | 0 | 4 | +12 | Champions |
| 2nd place, silver medalist(s) | Yugoslavia | 4 | 3 | 1 | 3 | +4 | Runners-up |
| 3rd place, bronze medalist(s) | Austria | 4 | 2 | 2 | 2 | −2 | Third place |
| 4 | Ireland | 4 | 3 | 1 | 3 | +6 | Fourth place |
| 5 | Wales | 4 | 2 | 2 | 2 | +4 | Fifth place |
| 6 | Belgium (H) | 4 | 1 | 3 | 1 | 0 | Sixth place |
| 7 | Switzerland | 4 | 2 | 2 | 2 | +2 | Seventh place |
| 8 | Finland | 4 | 1 | 3 | 1 | −4 | Eighth place |
| 9 | France | 4 | 0 | 4 | 0 | −22 | Ninth place |
