= 1977 European Junior Badminton Championships =

Badminton championships

Tournament details
- Dates: 9–14 April 1977
- Edition: 5th
- Venue: RAF Ta Kali hangar
- Location: Ta' Qali, Malta

The 1977 European Junior Badminton Championships was the fifth edition of the European Junior Badminton Championships. It was held in Ta' Qali, Malta, in the month of April. English players dominated by winning five out of six matches which includes the mixed team championships as well. Danish team won the Boys' doubles title. Kevin Jolly, the English player who was scheduled to play in three final showdowns suffered foot injury, preventing him from contesting all the matches. Thus, matches for only Girls' singles and Girls' doubles were played on final day. The large-scale final day had to be saved with some show matches. In these show matches, Sweden's Ulf Johansson beat Andy Goode, England, who was named champion in singles, while Jesper and Niels in doubles beat Nigel Tier & Gary Reeves, England, 18-13, 15-11.

== Medalists ==
Discipline	Gold	Silver	Bronze
Boys' singles	(England) Andy Goode	(England) Kevin Jolly	(Sweden) Göran Carlsson
Boys' singles	(England) Andy Goode	(England) Kevin Jolly	(Sweden) Ulf Johansson
Girls' singles	(England) Karen Bridge	(Denmark) Kirsten Meier	(Denmark) Agnethe Juul
Girls' singles	(England) Karen Bridge	(Denmark) Kirsten Meier	(Sweden) Carina Andersson
Boys' doubles	(Denmark) Jesper Toftlund (Denmark) Niels Christensen	(England) Kevin Jolly (England) Nigel Tier	(Denmark) Niels Hansen (Denmark) Jan Hammergaard-Hansen
Boys' doubles	(Denmark) Jesper Toftlund (Denmark) Niels Christensen	(England) Kevin Jolly (England) Nigel Tier	(Sweden) Ulf Johansson (Sweden) Göran Carlsson
Girls' doubles	(England) Karen Bridge (England) Karen Puttick	(Scotland) Pamela Hamilton (Scotland) Joy Reid	(Scotland) Linda Gardner (Scotland) Jill Crombie
Girls' doubles	(England) Karen Bridge (England) Karen Puttick	(Scotland) Pamela Hamilton (Scotland) Joy Reid	(Denmark) Bente Terkelsen (Denmark) Charlotte Pilgaard
Mixed doubles	(England) Nigel Tier (England) Karen Puttick	(England) Kevin Jolly (England) Karen Bridge	(Denmark) Jan Hammergaard-Hansen (Denmark) Kirsten Meier
Mixed doubles	(England) Nigel Tier (England) Karen Puttick	(England) Kevin Jolly (England) Karen Bridge	(Denmark) Jesper Toftlund (Denmark) Karen Kiil
Mixed team	England; Kevin Jolly; Karen Bridge; Nigel Tier; Karen Puttick	Denmark; Jens Hinrichsen; Agnethe Juul; Niels Christensen; Jesper Toftlund; Bettina Kristensen; Kirsten Meier; Karen Kiil; Niels Hansen; Jan Hammergaard	Sweden; Göran Carlsson; Carina Andersson; Ulf Johansson; Ann-Sofi Bergmann; Allan Pettersson

== Results ==
=== Semi-finals ===
Category	Winner	Runner-up	Score
Boys' singles	(England) Kevin Jolly	(Sweden) Göran Carlsson	15–5, 15–10
Boys' singles	(England) Andy Goode	(Sweden) Ulf Johansson	11–15, 15–12, 17–14
Girls' singles	(Denmark) Kirsten Meier	(Denmark) Agnethe Juul	11–8, 2–11, 11–8
Girls' singles	(England) Karen Bridge	(Sweden) Carina Andersson	11–7, 11–4
Boys' doubles	(England) Kevin Jolly (England) Nigel Tier	(Denmark) Jan Hammergaard-Hansen (Denmark) Niels Hansen	15–8, 15–12
Boys' doubles	(Denmark) Jesper Toftlund (Denmark) Niels Christensen	(Sweden) Göran Carlsson (Sweden) Ulf Johansson	17–14, 15–3
Girls' doubles	(England) Karen Bridge (England) Karen Puttick	(Scotland) Jill Crombie (Scotland) Linda Gardner	17–15, 15–8
Girls' doubles	(Scotland) Joy Reid (Scotland) Pamela Hamilton	(Denmark) Bente Terkelsen (Denmark) Charlotte Pilgaard	15–12, 15–8
Mixed doubles	(England) Kevin Jolly (England) Karen Bridge	(Denmark) Jan Hammergaard-Hansen (Denmark) Kirsten Meier	15–6, 15–11
Mixed doubles	(England) Nigel Tier (England) Karen Puttick	(Denmark) Jesper Toftlund (Denmark) Karen Kiil	15–5, 15–9

=== Final ===
Category	Winner	Runners-up	Score
Boys' singles	(England) Andy Goode	(England) Kevin Jolly	Walkover
Girls' singles	(England) Karen Bridge	(Denmark) Kirsten Meier	11–8, 11–3
Boys' doubles	(Denmark) Jesper Toftlund (Denmark) Niels Christensen	(England) Kevin Jolly (England) Nigel Tier	Walkover
Girls' doubles	(England) Karen Bridge (England) Karen Puttick	(Scotland) Joy Reid (Scotland) Pamela Hamilton	15–4, 15–5
Mixed doubles	(England) Nigel Tier (England) Karen Puttick	(England) Kevin Jolly (England) Karen Bridge	Walkover

== Medal table ==
Rank	Nation	Gold	Silver	Bronze	Total
1	England (ENG)	5	3	0	8
2	Denmark (DEN)	1	2	5	8
3	Scotland (SCO)	0	1	1	2
4	Sweden (SWE)	0	0	5	5
Totals (4 entries)		6	6	11	23
