= 1973 Helvetia Cup =

Badminton event

1973 Helvetia Cup Helvetia-Cup 1973
Tournament details
- Dates: 27 – 28 April
- Edition: 11
- Venue: Graz Badminton Centre
- Location: Graz, Austria

The 1973 Helvetia Cup was the eleventh edition of the Helvetia Cup mixed team badminton tournament. This was the second time Austria have hosted the tournament. New countries were introduced and made their debut in the tournament following the absence of powerhouses West Germany and the Netherlands.

Czechoslovakia made history by winning the Helvetia Cup for the first time, defeating Norway and Austria in the final stage. In the classification rounds, Yugoslavia placed first in their group by defeating Switzerland and Hungary while Finland won their group by defeating Wales and Belgium.

== Tournament ==
The 1973 Helvetia Cup was scheduled to be held from 27 to 28 April 1973 with nine countries participating in the tournament. Hungary and Yugoslavia made their debut in the tournament, replacing the two slots that were originally for West Germany and the Netherlands.

=== Venue ===
This tournament was held at the Graz Badminton Centre in Graz, Austria.

=== Draw ===
The draw was announced on 23 April 1973. The group stage consists of 3 groups, Group 1, Group 2 and Group 3.

| Group 1 | Group 2 | Group 3 |
|---|---|---|
| Belgium; Norway; Yugoslavia | Austria; Hungary; Wales | Czechoslovakia; Switzerland; Finland |

== Group stage ==
All times are Central European Time (UTC+01:00).

=== Group 1 ===
| Pos | Team | Pld | W | L | MF | MA | MD | Pts | Qualification |
|---|---|---|---|---|---|---|---|---|---|
| 1 | Norway | 2 | 2 | 0 | 9 | 5 | +4 | 2 | Final |
| 2 | Yugoslavia | 2 | 1 | 1 | 6 | 8 | −2 | 1 | 4th–6th place |
| 3 | Belgium | 2 | 0 | 2 | 6 | 8 | −2 | 0 | 7th–9th place |

Source: National Library of Norway

28 April 1973

| Belgium | 4–3 | Yugoslavia |
Report

Graz Badminton Centre, Austria

28 April 1973

| Norway | 4–3 | Yugoslavia |
Report

Graz Badminton Centre, Austria

28 April 1973

| Belgium | 2–5 | Norway |
Report

Graz Badminton Centre, Austria

=== Group 2 ===
| Pos | Team | Pld | W | L | MF | MA | MD | Pts | Qualification |
|---|---|---|---|---|---|---|---|---|---|
| 1 | Austria (H) | 2 | 2 | 0 | 13 | 1 | +12 | 2 | Final |
| 2 | Hungary | 2 | 1 | 1 | 7 | 7 | 0 | 1 | 4th–6th place |
| 3 | Wales | 2 | 0 | 2 | 1 | 13 | −12 | 0 | 7th–9th place |

Source: National Library of Norway
(H) Host

28 April 1973

| Austria | 6–1 | Hungary |
Report

Graz Badminton Centre, Austria

28 April 1973

| Wales | 1–6 | Hungary |
Report

Graz Badminton Centre, Austria

28 April 1973

| Austria | 7–0 | Wales |
Report

Graz Badminton Centre, Austria

=== Group 3 ===
| Pos | Team | Pld | W | L | MF | MA | MD | Pts | Qualification |
|---|---|---|---|---|---|---|---|---|---|
| 1 | Czechoslovakia | 2 | 2 | 0 | 11 | 3 | +8 | 2 | Final |
| 2 | Switzerland | 2 | 1 | 1 | 7 | 7 | 0 | 1 | 4th–6th place |
| 3 | Finland | 2 | 0 | 2 | 3 | 11 | −8 | 0 | 7th–9th place |

Source: National Library of Norway

28 April 1973

| Finland | 1–6 | Czechoslovakia |
Report

Graz Badminton Centre, Austria

28 April 1973

| Switzerland | 2–5 | Czechoslovakia |
Report

Graz Badminton Centre, Austria

28 April 1973

| Finland | 2–5 | Switzerland |
Report

Graz Badminton Centre, Austria

== Classification round ==
=== 7th–9th place ===
| Pos | Team | Pld | W | L | MF | MA | MD | Pts | Qualification |
|---|---|---|---|---|---|---|---|---|---|
| 1 | Finland | 2 | 2 | 0 | 8 | 6 | +2 | 2 | Seventh place |
| 2 | Wales | 2 | 1 | 1 | 7 | 7 | 0 | 1 | Eighth place |
| 3 | Belgium | 2 | 0 | 2 | 6 | 8 | −2 | 0 | Ninth place |

Source: e-newspaperarchives.ch

29 April 1973

| Belgium | 3–4 | Wales |
Report

Graz Badminton Centre, Austria

29 April 1973

| Finland | 4–3 | Wales |
Report

Graz Badminton Centre, Austria

29 April 1973

| Belgium | 3–4 | Finland |
Report

Graz Badminton Centre, Austria

=== 4th–6th place ===
| Pos | Team | Pld | W | L | MF | MA | MD | Pts | Qualification |
|---|---|---|---|---|---|---|---|---|---|
| 1 | Yugoslavia | 2 | 2 | 0 | 13 | 1 | +12 | 2 | Fourth place |
| 2 | Switzerland | 2 | 1 | 1 | 4 | 10 | −6 | 1 | Fifth place |
| 3 | Hungary | 2 | 0 | 2 | 4 | 10 | −6 | 0 | Sixth place |

Source: e-newspaperarchives.ch

==== Switzerland vs Yugoslavia ====
Switzerland
0
Graz Badminton Centre
29 April 1973

Yugoslavia
7

| | | | 1 | 2 | 3 |
|---|---|---|---|---|---|
| 1 | (Switzerland) (Socialist Federal Republic of Yugoslavia) | Edy Andrey; Stane Koprivšek | 11; 15 | 11; 15 |
| 2 | (Switzerland) (Socialist Federal Republic of Yugoslavia) | Kurt Achleitner; Gregor Berden | 5; 15 | 8; 15 |
| 3 | (Switzerland) (Socialist Federal Republic of Yugoslavia) | Anton Sauter; Danče Pohar | 7; 15 | 5; 15 |
| 4 | (Switzerland) (Socialist Federal Republic of Yugoslavia) | Liselotte Blumer; Lučka Križman | 10; 12 | 11; 8 | 7; 11 |
| 5 | (Switzerland) (Socialist Federal Republic of Yugoslavia) | Edy Andrey / Hubert Riedo; Jani Čaleta / Stane Koprivšek | 8; 15 | 12; 15 |
| 6 | (Switzerland) (Socialist Federal Republic of Yugoslavia) | Liselotte Blumer / José Carrel; Vita Bohinc / Lučka Križman | 5; 15 | 5; 15 |
| 7 | (Switzerland) (Socialist Federal Republic of Yugoslavia) | Hubert Riedo / José Carrel; Gregor Berden / Marta Amf | 9; 15 | 3; 15 |

==== Yugoslavia vs Hungary ====
Yugoslavia
6
Graz Badminton Centre
29 April 1973

Hungary
1

| | | | 1 | 2 | 3 |
|---|---|---|---|---|---|
| 1 | (Socialist Federal Republic of Yugoslavia) (Hungary) | Stane Koprivšek; László Rammer | 12; 15 | 15; 3 | 15; 12 |
| 2 | (Socialist Federal Republic of Yugoslavia) (Hungary) | Gregor Berden; András Révész | 15; 10 | 15; 8 |
| 3 | (Socialist Federal Republic of Yugoslavia) (Hungary) | Danče Pohar; Tibor Jován | 15; 2 | 15; 2 |
| 4 | (Socialist Federal Republic of Yugoslavia) (Hungary) | Vita Bohinc; Éva Cserni | 3; 11 | 8; 11 |
| 5 | (Socialist Federal Republic of Yugoslavia) (Hungary) | Jani Čaleta / Stane Koprivšek; Tibor Jován / József Papp | 15; 7 | 15; 7 |
| 6 | (Socialist Federal Republic of Yugoslavia) (Hungary) | Vita Bohinc / Lučka Križman; Gertrúd Ladányi / Erzsébet Wolf | 15; 6 | 15; 4 |
| 7 | (Socialist Federal Republic of Yugoslavia) (Hungary) | Gregor Berden / Marta Amf; János Cserni / Éva Cserni | 15; 11 | 17; 18 | 15; 11 |

==== Switzerland vs Hungary ====
Switzerland
4
Graz Badminton Centre
29 April 1973

Hungary
3

| | | | 1 | 2 | 3 |
|---|---|---|---|---|---|
| 1 | (Switzerland) (Hungary) | Edy Andrey; János Cserni | 15; 12 | 11; 15 | 2; 15 |
| 2 | (Switzerland) (Hungary) | Kurt Achleitner; László Rammer | 15; 12 | 15; 9 |
| 3 | (Switzerland) (Hungary) | Anton Sauter; József Papp | 18; 14 | 15; 13 |
| 4 | (Switzerland) (Hungary) | Liselotte Blumer; Ildikó Szabó | 11; 5 | 11; 3 |
| 5 | (Switzerland) (Hungary) | Edy Andrey / Hubert Riedo; László Rammer / József Papp | 15; 2 | 15; 3 |
| 6 | (Switzerland) (Hungary) | Liselotte Blumer / José Carrel; Éva Cserni / Gertrúd Ladányi | 1; 15 | 15; 17 |
| 7 | (Switzerland) (Hungary) | Hubert Riedo / José Carrel; János Cserni / Éva Cserni | 9; 15 | 11; 15 |

== Final ==
=== Round robin ===
| Pos | Team | Pld | W | L | MF | MA | MD | Pts | Qualification |
|---|---|---|---|---|---|---|---|---|---|
| 1 | Czechoslovakia | 2 | 2 | 0 | 9 | 5 | +4 | 2 | Champions |
| 2 | Norway | 2 | 1 | 1 | 6 | 8 | −2 | 1 | Runners-up |
| 3 | Austria (H) | 2 | 0 | 2 | 6 | 8 | −2 | 0 | Third place |

Source: e-newspaperarchives.ch
(H) Host

==== Czechoslovakia vs Norway ====
Czechoslovakia
5
Graz Badminton Centre
29 April 1973

Norway
2

| | | | 1 | 2 | 3 |
|---|---|---|---|---|---|
| 1 | (Czechoslovakia) (Norway) | Petr Lacina; Hans Sperre | 15; 8 | 15; 9 |
| 2 | (Czechoslovakia) (Norway) | Miroslav Kokojan; Harald Nettli | 15; 10 | 15; 6 |
| 3 | (Czechoslovakia) (Norway) | Konstantin Holobradý; Gunnar Dæhlin | 11; 15 | 15; 4 | 15; 5 |
| 4 | (Czechoslovakia) (Norway) | Alena Poboráková; Kari Histøl | 11; 12 | 11; 4 | 11; 5 |
| 5 | (Czechoslovakia) (Norway) | Miroslav Kokojan / Petr Lacina; Pål Øian / Hans Sperre | 13; 18 | 7; 15 |
| 6 | (Czechoslovakia) (Norway) | Jaroslava Krahulcová / Alena Poboráková; Kari Histøl / Elisabeth Sommerfeldt | 15; 2 | 15; 5 |
| 7 | (Czechoslovakia) (Norway) | Konstantin Holobradý / Jaroslava Krahulcová; Harald Nettli / Elisabeth Sommerfeldt | 5; 15 | 11; 15 |

==== Austria vs Norway ====
Austria
3
Graz Badminton Centre
29 April 1973

Norway
4

| | | | 1 | 2 | 3 |
|---|---|---|---|---|---|
| 1 | (Austria) (Norway) | Hermann Fröhlich; Knut Engebretsen | 3; 15 | 8; 15 |
| 2 | (Austria) (Norway) | Alfred Hofer; Pål Øian | 15; 8 | 15; 6 |
| 3 | (Austria) (Norway) | Reinhold Pum; Gunnar Dæhlin | 15; 8 | 15; 0 |
| 4 | (Austria) (Norway) | Britta Kirchhofer; Kari Histøl | 3; 11 | 2; 11 |
| 5 | (Austria) (Norway) | Alfred Hofer / Dieter Hofer; Harald Nettli / Hans Sperre | 5; 15 | 6; 15 |
| 6 | (Austria) (Norway) | Brigitte Reichmann / Elisabeth Schechtner; Kari Histøl / Wenche Tønnesen | 17; 14 | 15; 13 |
| 7 | (Austria) (Norway) | Hermann Fröhlich / Lore König; Harald Nettli / Elisabeth Sommerfeldt | 1; 15 | 5; 15 |

==== Austria vs Czechoslovakia ====
Austria
3
Graz Badminton Centre
29 April 1973

Czechoslovakia
4

| | | | 1 | 2 | 3 |
|---|---|---|---|---|---|
| 1 | (Austria) (Czechoslovakia) | Hermann Fröhlich; Petr Lacina | 12; 15 | 12; 15 |
| 2 | (Austria) (Czechoslovakia) | Alfred Hofer; Miroslav Kokojan | 15; 5 | 15; 7 |
| 3 | (Austria) (Czechoslovakia) | Reinhold Pum; Konstantin Holobradý | 15; 3 | 15; 8 |
| 4 | (Austria) (Czechoslovakia) | Britta Kirchhofer; Alena Poboráková | 6; 11 | 5; 11 |
| 5 | (Austria) (Czechoslovakia) | Alfred Hofer / Dieter Hofer; Miroslav Kokojan / Petr Lacina | 12; 15 | 9; 15 |
| 6 | (Austria) (Czechoslovakia) | Brigitte Reichmann / Elisabeth Schechtner; Jaroslava Krahulcová / Alena Poboráková | 13; 15 | 15; 10 | 7; 15 |
| 7 | (Austria) (Czechoslovakia) | Hermann Fröhlich / Lore König; Konstantin Holobradý / Jaroslava Krahulcová | 15; 11 | 15; 8 |

1973 Helvetia Cup winner

Czechoslovakia
First title

== Final ranking ==
| Pos | Team | Pld | W | L | Pts | MD | Final result |
|---|---|---|---|---|---|---|---|
| 1st place, gold medalist(s) | Czechoslovakia | 4 | 4 | 0 | 4 | +12 | Champions |
| 2nd place, silver medalist(s) | Norway | 4 | 3 | 1 | 3 | +2 | Runners-up |
| 3rd place, bronze medalist(s) | Austria (H) | 4 | 2 | 2 | 2 | +10 | Third place |
| 4 | Yugoslavia | 4 | 3 | 1 | 3 | +10 | Fourth place |
| 5 | Switzerland | 4 | 2 | 2 | 2 | −6 | Fifth place |
| 6 | Hungary | 4 | 1 | 3 | 1 | −6 | Sixth place |
| 7 | Finland | 4 | 2 | 2 | 2 | −6 | Seventh place |
| 8 | Wales | 4 | 1 | 3 | 1 | −12 | Eighth place |
| 9 | Belgium | 4 | 0 | 4 | 0 | −4 | Ninth place |
