= 1969 Helvetia Cup =

Badminton event

1969 Helvetia Cup Helvetia Cupu 1969
Tournament details
- Dates: 26 – 27 April
- Edition: 8
- Venue: Hala Pražské Sparty
- Location: Prague, Czechoslovakia

The 1969 Helvetia Cup was the eighth edition of the Helvetia Cup mixed team badminton tournament. Prague was announced as the host for the Helvetia Cup after Oslo in 1968.

West Germany won their eighth consecutive title by defeating the Netherlands 4–3 in the final. In the playoff for third place, Austria defeated Czechoslovakia 6–1. In the classification round, Wales defeated Norway 6–1 for fifth place while Finland defeated Switzerland for seventh place.

== Tournament ==
The 1969 Helvetia Cup was scheduled to be held from 26 to 27 April 1969. Eight countries competed in the tournament, with Wales making their first ever appearance in the tournament.

=== Venue ===
This tournament was held at the Hala Pražské Sparty in Prague, Czechoslovakia.

=== Draw ===
The draw was announced on 25 April 1969. The group stage consists of 2 groups, Group A and Group B.

Group A	Group B
Finland; West Germany; Netherlands; Switzerland	Austria; Czechoslovakia; Norway; Wales

== Group stage ==
All times are Central European Time (UTC+01:00).

=== Group A ===
Pos	Team	Pld	W	L	MF	MA	MD	Pts	Qualification
1	West Germany	3	3	0	19	2	+17	3	Knockout stage
2	Netherlands	3	2	1	15	6	+9	2	Knockout stage
3	Finland	3	1	2	6	15	−9	1	Classification round
4	Switzerland	3	0	3	2	19	−17	0	Classification round

Source: e-newspaperarchives.ch

26 April 1969

West Germany	7–0	Finland
Report

Hala Pražské Sparty, Czechoslovakia

26 April 1969

Netherlands	7–0	Switzerland
Report

Hala Pražské Sparty, Czechoslovakia

26 April 1969

West Germany	7–0	Switzerland
Report

Hala Pražské Sparty, Czechoslovakia

26 April 1969

Netherlands	6–1	Finland
Report

Hala Pražské Sparty, Czechoslovakia

26 April 1969

West Germany	5–2	Netherlands
Report

Hala Pražské Sparty, Czechoslovakia

26 April 1969

Finland	5–2	Switzerland
Report

Hala Pražské Sparty, Czechoslovakia

=== Group B ===
Pos	Team	Pld	W	L	MF	MA	MD	Pts	Qualification
1	Austria	3	3	0	13	8	+5	3	Knockout stage
2	Czechoslovakia (H)	3	2	1	10	11	−1	2	Knockout stage
3	Norway	3	1	2	10	11	−1	1	Classification round
4	Wales	3	0	3	9	12	−3	0	Classification round

Source: e-newspaperarchives.ch
(H) Host

26 April 1969

Norway	3–4	Czechoslovakia
Report

Hale Pražské Sparty, Czechoslovakia

26 April 1969

Austria	4–3	Wales
Report

Hale Pražské Sparty, Czechoslovakia

26 April 1969

Austria	4–3	Norway
Report

Hale Pražské Sparty, Czechoslovakia

26 April 1969

Czechoslovakia	4–3	Wales
Report

Hale Pražské Sparty, Czechoslovakia

26 April 1969

Austria	5–2	Czechoslovakia
Report

Hale Pražské Sparty, Czechoslovakia

26 April 1969

Norway	4–3	Wales
Report

Hale Pražské Sparty, Czechoslovakia

== Classification round ==
=== Bracket ===
Fifth to sixth place
26 April
Norway	5
Switzerland	2
26 April
Wales	4
Finland	3

Fifth place
27 April
Norway	1
Wales	6
Seventh place
27 April
Switzerland	3
Finland	4

== Knockout stage ==
=== Bracket ===
Semi-finals
26 April
West Germany	7
Czechoslovakia	0
26 April
Austria	2
Netherlands	5

Final
27 April
West Germany	4
Netherlands	3
Third place play-off
27 April
Czechoslovakia	1
Austria	6

1969 Helvetia Cup winner

West Germany
Eighth title

== Final ranking ==
Pos	Team	Pld	W	L	Pts	MD	Final result
1st place, gold medalist(s)	West Germany	5	5	0	5	+25	Champions
2nd place, silver medalist(s)	Netherlands	5	3	2	3	+11	Runners-up
3rd place, bronze medalist(s)	Austria	5	4	1	4	+7	Third place
4	Czechoslovakia (H)	5	2	3	2	−13	Fourth place
5	Wales	5	2	3	2	+3	Eliminated in group stage
6	Norway	5	2	3	2	−3	Eliminated in group stage
7	Finland	5	2	3	2	−9	Eliminated in group stage
8	Switzerland	5	0	5	0	−21	Eliminated in group stage
