= 1962 Helvetia Cup =

Badminton event

1962 Helvetia Cup Cup der Nationen dei Badminton 1962 Coupe des Nations de Badminton 1962 Coppa delle Nazioni di badminton 1962 Cupa dallas Naziuns da Badminton 1962
Tournament details
- Dates: 10 – 11 March
- Edition: 1
- Venue: Kantonsschule Zürich Nord Hall
- Location: Zürich, Switzerland

The 1962 Helvetia Cup (also known as the 1962 Badminton Cup of Nations) was the inaugural edition of the Helvetia Cup mixed team badminton tournament. The tournament was envisioned by the Swiss Badminton Association to further spread the popularity of the sport in the European region and in European countries where badminton is still partially recognized and played.

== Tournament ==
The 1962 Helvetia Cup was scheduled to be held from 10 to 11 March 1962 with the participation of six countries in the Central European region, these countries were Austria, Belgium, France, the Netherlands, West Germany and Switzerland.

=== Venue ===
This tournament was held at the Kantonsschule Zürich Nord Hall in Zürich, Switzerland.

=== Draw ===
The draw was announced on 9 March 1962. The group stage consists of 2 groups, Group 1 and Group 2. The French team who were drawn into Group 2 withdrew from the competition.

Group 1	Group 2
Austria; Netherlands; Switzerland	Belgium; West Germany; France

== Group stage ==
All times are Central European Time (UTC+01:00).

=== Group 1 ===
Pos	Team	Pld	W	L	MF	MA	MD	Pts	Qualification
1	Netherlands	2	2	0	15	1	+14	2	Final
2	Austria	2	1	1	8	8	0	1	3rd–4th place
3	Switzerland (H)	2	0	2	1	15	−14	0	

Source: newspaperarchives.ch
(H) Host

10 March 1962

Netherlands	8–0	Switzerland
Report

Kantonsschule Zürich Nord Hall, Switzerland

10 March 1962

Netherlands	7–1	Austria
Report

Kantonsschule Zürich Nord Hall, Switzerland

10 March 1962

Austria	7–1	Switzerland
Report

Kantonsschule Zürich Nord Hall, Switzerland

=== Group 2 ===
Pos	Team	Pld	W	L	MF	MA	MD	Pts	Qualification
1	West Germany	2	1	0	8	0	+8	1	Final
2	Belgium	2	0	1	0	8	−8	0	3rd–4th place
3	France	0	0	0	0	0	0	0	Withdrew

Source: newspaperarchives.ch

10 March 1962

West Germany	8–0	Belgium
Report

Kantonsschule Zürich Nord Hall, Switzerland

10 March 1962

West Germany	Cancelled	France
Report

Kantonsschule Zürich Nord Hall, Switzerland

10 March 1962

Belgium	Cancelled	France
Report

Kantonsschule Zürich Nord Hall, Switzerland

== Classification round ==
=== 3rd–4th place ===
Austria
7
Kantonsschule Zürich Nord Hall
11 March 1962

Belgium
1

			1	2	3
1	(Austria) (Belgium)	Reinhold Pum; Anton Verstoep	15; 7	15; 12
2	(Austria) (Belgium)	Fritz Plöckinger; Roger van Meerbeek	15; 10	15; 6
3	(Austria) (Belgium)	Bernd Frohnwieser; Herman Moens	15; 12	15; 5
4	(Austria) (Belgium)	Christa Rainer; Bep Verstoep	2; 11	11; 9	7; 11
5	(Austria) (Belgium)	Bernd Frohnwieser / Heinz Ottmann; Roger van Meerbeek / Herman Moens	15; 8	15; 6
6	(Austria) (Belgium)	Hermann Fröhlich / Reinhold Pum; Guy van Branteghem / Jack Stuart	15; 10	15; 3
7	(Austria) (Belgium)	Britta Kajdasz / Christa Rainer; Bep Verstoep / June van der Willigen	15; 7	15; 6
8	(Austria) (Belgium)	Hermann Fröhlich / Lore Voit; Anton Verstoep / June van der Willigen	8; 15	15; 3	15; 13

=== Final ===
West Germany
8
Kantonsschule Zürich Nord Hall
11 March 1962

Netherlands
0

			1	2	3
1	(West Germany) (Netherlands)	Kurt Jendroska; Cees Broedelet	15; 10	15; 6
2	(West Germany) (Netherlands)	Walter Stuch; Lex Meijer	15; 6	5; 15	15; 6
3	(West Germany) (Netherlands)	Konrad Hapke; Henk Weys	15; 9	7; 15	15; 5
4	(West Germany) (Netherlands)	Irmgard Latz; Marloes van Swelm	11; 4	11; 2
5	(West Germany) (Netherlands)	Konrad Hapke / Dieter Schramm; Lex Meijer / Pim Seth Paul	15; 8	1; 15	18; 13
6	(West Germany) (Netherlands)	Kurt Jendroska / Günter Ropertz; Huub van Ginneken / Henk Weys	12; 15	15; 13	15; 2
7	(West Germany) (Netherlands)	Irmgard Latz / Hannelore Schmidt; Els Robbé / Wil Haye	15; 7	15; 0
8	(West Germany) (Netherlands)	Dieter Schramm / Ute Seelbach; Pim Seth Paul / Marloes van Swelm	11; 15	15; 1	15; 10

1962 Helvetia Cup winner

West Germany
First title

== Final ranking ==
Pos	Team	Pld	W	L	Pts	MD	Final result
1st place, gold medalist(s)	West Germany	2	2	0	2	+16	Champions
2nd place, silver medalist(s)	Netherlands	3	2	1	2	+6	Runners-up
3rd place, bronze medalist(s)	Austria	3	2	1	2	+6	Third place
4	Belgium	2	0	2	0	−14	Fourth place
5	Switzerland (H)	2	0	2	0	−14	Eliminated in group stage
6	France	0	0	0	0	0	Withdrew
