= 1966 Helvetia Cup =

Badminton event

1966 Helvetia Cup Helvetia-Beker 1966 Helvetia-Cup 1966 Coupe Helvétia 1966
Tournament details
- Dates: 24 – 25 April
- Edition: 5
- Venue: Hall Sportif du Mayfair
- Location: Brussels, Belgium

The 1966 Helvetia Cup was the fifth edition of the Helvetia Cup mixed team badminton tournament. The tournament was held in Brussels, Belgium.

West Germany won the title for a fifth consecutive time by defeating the Netherlands 8–0 in the final. In the playoff for third place, Austria defeated Belgium 5–3. In the playoffs for fifth place, Norway defeated Switzerland 6–2.

== Tournament ==
The 1966 Helvetia Cup was scheduled to be held from 24 to 25 April 1966 with the participation of six countries which were Austria, Belgium, the Netherlands, Switzerland, West Germany and Norway.

=== Venue ===
This tournament was held at the Hall Sportif du Mayfair in Brussels, Belgium.

=== Draw ===
The draw was announced on 23 April 1966. The group stage consists of 2 groups, Group 1 and Group 2.

Group 1	Group 2
Netherlands; Belgium; Norway	Austria; West Germany; Switzerland

== Group stage ==
All times are Central European Time (UTC+01:00).

=== Group 1 ===
Pos	Team	Pld	W	L	MF	MA	MD	Pts	Qualification
1	Netherlands	2	2	0	15	1	+14	2	Final
2	Belgium (H)	2	1	1	5	11	−6	1	3rd–4th place
3	Norway	2	0	2	4	12	−8	0	5th–6th place

Source: National Library of Norway
(H) Host

24 April 1966

Netherlands	7–1	Belgium
Report

Hall Sportif du Mayfair, Belgium

24 April 1966

Netherlands	8–0	Norway
Report

Hall Sportif du Mayfair, Belgium

24 April 1966

Belgium	4–4	Norway
Report

Hall Sportif du Mayfair, Belgium

=== Group 2 ===
Pos	Team	Pld	W	L	MF	MA	MD	Pts	Qualification
1	West Germany	2	2	0	16	0	+16	2	Final
2	Austria	2	1	1	7	9	−2	1	3rd–4th place
3	Switzerland	2	0	2	1	15	−14	0	5th–6th place

Source: Delpher

24 April 1966

West Germany	8–0	Austria
Report

Hall Sportif du Mayfair, Belgium

24 April 1966

West Germany	8–0	Switzerland
Report

Hall Sportif du Mayfair, Belgium

24 April 1966

Austria	7–1	Switzerland
Report

Hall Sportif du Mayfair, Belgium

== Classification round ==
=== 5th–6th place ===
25 April 1965

Norway	6–2	Switzerland
Report

Hall Sportif du Mayfair, Belgium

=== 3rd–4th place ===
25 April 1965

Austria	5–3	Belgium
Report

Hall Sportif du Mayfair, Belgium

=== Final ===
25 April 1965

West Germany	8–0	Netherlands
Report

Hall Sportif du Mayfair, Belgium

==== Fixture ====
West Germany
8
Hall Sportif du Mayfair
25 April 1966

Netherlands
0

			1	2	3
1	(West Germany) (Netherlands)	Wolfgang Bochow; Huub van Ginneken	15; 8	15; 9
2	(West Germany) (Netherlands)	Franz Beinvogl; Ruud van Ginneken	12; 15	15; 11	15; 2
3	(West Germany) (Netherlands)	Friedhelm Wulff; Leo Kountul	15; 17	15; 9	15; 6
4	(West Germany) (Netherlands)	Irmgard Latz; Agnes Geene	11; 7	8; 11	11; 2
5	(West Germany) (Netherlands)	Wolfgang Bochow / Friedhelm Wulff; Leo Kountul / Huub van Ginneken	15; 7	15; 2
6	(West Germany) (Netherlands)	Franz Beinvogl / Siegfried Betz; Henk Weys / Ruud van Ginneken	15; 6	15; 10
7	(West Germany) (Netherlands)	Irmgard Latz / Marieluise Wackerow; Felice de Nooyer / Agnes Geene	13; 18	15; 1	15; 8
8	(West Germany) (Netherlands)	Friedhelm Wulff / Marieluise Wackerow; Leendert Boelen / Tonny Pannemans	15; 10	11; 15	15; 2

1966 Helvetia Cup winner

West Germany
Fifth title

== Final ranking ==
Pos	Team	Pld	W	L	Pts	MD	Final result
1st place, gold medalist(s)	West Germany	3	3	0	3	+24	Champions
2nd place, silver medalist(s)	Netherlands	3	2	1	2	+6	Runners-up
3rd place, bronze medalist(s)	Austria	3	2	1	2	0	Third place
4	Belgium (H)	3	0	2	1	−8	Fourth place
5	Norway	3	1	1	2	−12	Fifth place
6	Switzerland	3	0	3	0	−18	Sixth place
