= 1967 Helvetia Cup =

Badminton event

1967 Helvetia Cup Helvetia-Cup 1967 Coupe Helvétia 1967 Coppa Helvetia 1967 Cupa Helvetia 1967
Tournament details
- Dates: 22 – 23 April
- Edition: 6
- Venue: Centre de Badminton Malley
- Location: Lausanne, Switzerland

The 1967 Helvetia Cup was the sixth edition of the Helvetia Cup mixed team badminton tournament. This was the second time Switzerland hosted the tournament.

Defending champions West Germany won their sixth consecutive title by defeating the Netherlands 7–1 in the final. In the playoff for third place, Austria defeated Belgium 7–1. In the playoffs for fifth place, Norway defeated Switzerland 7–1.

== Tournament ==
The 1967 Helvetia Cup was scheduled to be held from 22 to 23 April 1967 with the participation of six countries which were Austria, Belgium, the Netherlands, Switzerland, West Germany and Norway.

=== Venue ===
This tournament was held at the Centre de Badminton Malley in Lausanne, Switzerland.

=== Draw ===
The draw was announced on 21 April 1965. The group stage consists of 2 groups, Group A and Group B.

Group A	Group B
West Germany; Austria; Norway	Belgium; Netherlands; Switzerland

== Group stage ==
All times are Central European Time (UTC+01:00).

=== Group A ===
Pos	Team	Pld	W	L	MF	MA	MD	Pts	Qualification
1	West Germany	2	2	0	16	0	+16	2	Final
2	Austria	2	1	1	6	10	−4	1	3rd–4th place
3	Norway	2	0	2	2	14	−12	0	5th–6th place

Source: e-newspaperarchives.ch

22 April 1967

West Germany	8–0	Austria
Report

Centre de Badminton Malley, Switzerland

22 April 1967

West Germany	8–0	Norway
Report

Centre de Badminton Malley, Switzerland

22 April 1967

Austria	6–2	Norway
Report

Centre de Badminton Malley, Switzerland

=== Group B ===
Pos	Team	Pld	W	L	MF	MA	MD	Pts	Qualification
1	Netherlands	2	2	0	15	1	+14	2	Final
2	Belgium	2	1	1	6	10	−4	1	3rd–4th place
3	Switzerland	2	0	2	3	13	−10	0	5th–6th place

Source: e-newspaperarchives.ch

22 April 1967

Netherlands	8–0	Switzerland
Report

Centre de Badminton Malley, Switzerland

22 April 1967

Netherlands	7–1	Belgium
Report

Centre de Badminton Malley, Switzerland

22 April 1967

Belgium	5–3	Switzerland
Report

Centre de Badminton Malley, Switzerland

== Classification round ==
=== 5th–6th place ===
23 April 1967

Norway	7–1	Switzerland
Report

Centre de Badminton Malley, Switzerland

=== 3rd–4th place ===
23 April 1967

Austria	7–1	Belgium
Report

Centre de Badminton Malley, Switzerland

=== Final ===
23 April 1967

West Germany	7–1	Netherlands
Report

Centre de Badminton Malley, Switzerland

==== Fixture ====
West Germany
7
Centre de Badminton Malley
23 April 1967

Netherlands
1

			1	2	3
1	(West Germany) (Netherlands)	Karl-Heinz Garbers; Huub van Ginneken	15; 10	9; 15	15; 12
2	(West Germany) (Netherlands)	Horst Lösche; Ruud van Ginneken	4; 15	15; 7	15; 12
3	(West Germany) (Netherlands)	Heinz Wossowski; Leo Kountul	15; 7	15; 7
4	(West Germany) (Netherlands)	Gerda Schumacher; Joke van Beusekom	11; 8	11; 5
5	(West Germany) (Netherlands)	Karl-Heinz Garbers / Roland Maywald; Leo Kountul / Huub van Ginneken	17; 15	9; 15	15; 11
6	(West Germany) (Netherlands)	Horst Lösche / Heinz Wossowski; Leo Hanssen / Ad Verhoef	15; 5	15; 1
7	(West Germany) (Netherlands)	Karin Schäfers / Gerda Schumacher; Felice de Nooyer / Tonny Pannemans	15; 9	18; 13
8	(West Germany) (Netherlands)	Roland Maywald / Karin Schäfers; Ruud van Ginneken / Felice de Nooyer	15; 9	6; 15	3; 15

1967 Helvetia Cup winner

West Germany
Sixth title

== Final ranking ==
Pos	Team	Pld	W	L	Pts	MD	Final result
1st place, gold medalist(s)	West Germany	3	3	0	6	+22	Champions
2nd place, silver medalist(s)	Netherlands	3	2	1	4	+8	Runners-up
3rd place, bronze medalist(s)	Austria	3	2	1	4	+2	Third place
4	Belgium	3	1	2	2	−10	Fourth place
5	Norway	3	1	2	2	−6	Fifth place
6	Switzerland (H)	3	0	3	0	−16	Sixth place
