= 1987 European Junior Badminton Championships =

Badminton championships

Tournament details
- Dates: 12 – 19 April
- Edition: 10th
- Venue: Hali Mery
- Location: Warsaw, Poland

The 1987 European Junior Badminton Championships was the tenth edition of the European Junior Badminton Championships. It was held in Warsaw, Poland, in the month of April. Danish players won the Girls' singles, Boys' doubles and Mixed doubles while Finland won Boys' singles and Sweden won Girls' doubles title.

== Medalists ==
Discipline	Gold	Silver	Bronze
Boys' singles	(Finland) Pontus Jäntti	(Denmark) Michael Søgaard	(Denmark) Thomas Madsen
Boys' singles	(Finland) Pontus Jäntti	(Denmark) Michael Søgaard	(Denmark) Johnny Sørensen
Girls' singles	(Denmark) Helle Andersen	(England) Joanne Muggeridge	(Sweden) Catrine Bengtsson
Girls' singles	(Denmark) Helle Andersen	(England) Joanne Muggeridge	(Scotland) Anne Gibson
Boys' doubles	(Denmark) Michael Søgaard (Denmark) Jens Maibom	(Denmark) Thomas Olsen (Denmark) Frederik Lindqvist	(Netherlands) Rob Stalenhoef (Netherlands) Randy Trieling
Boys' doubles	(Denmark) Michael Søgaard (Denmark) Jens Maibom	(Denmark) Thomas Olsen (Denmark) Frederik Lindqvist	(England) Chris Hunt (England) Andrew Fairhurst
Girls' doubles	(Sweden) Catrine Bengtsson (Sweden) Margit Borg	(England) Julie Munday (England) Tracy Dineen	(Denmark) Helle Andersen (Denmark) Charlotte Madsen
Girls' doubles	(Sweden) Catrine Bengtsson (Sweden) Margit Borg	(England) Julie Munday (England) Tracy Dineen	(Denmark) Trine Johansson (Denmark) Marlene Thomsen
Mixed doubles	(Denmark) Jens Maibom (Denmark) Charlotte Madsen	(Sweden) Jonas Ericsson (Sweden) Margit Borg	(Netherlands) Randy Trieling (Netherlands) Sonja Mellink
Mixed doubles	(Denmark) Jens Maibom (Denmark) Charlotte Madsen	(Sweden) Jonas Ericsson (Sweden) Margit Borg	(England) Richard Harmsworth (England) Tracy Dineen
Mixed team	Denmark; Frederik Lindquist; Thomas Madsen; Jens Maibom; Thomas Olsen; Michael Søgaard; Helle Andersen; Trine Johansson; Charlotte Madsen; Anne Marie Laursen; Marlene Thomsen	England; Brocklesby; Andrew Fairhurst; Richard Harmsworth; Chris Hunt; Peter Knowles; Tracy Dineen; Felicity Gallup; Joanne Muggeridge; Julie Munday; Tracy Salmon	Sweden; Jonas Ericsson; Mats Svensson; Catrine Bengtsson; Margit Borg

== Medal table ==
Rank	Nation	Gold	Silver	Bronze	Total
1	Denmark (DEN)	4	2	4	10
2	Sweden (SWE)	1	1	2	4
3	Finland (FIN)	1	0	0	1
4	England (ENG)	0	3	2	5
5	Netherlands (NED)	0	0	2	2
6	Scotland (SCO)	0	0	1	1
Totals (6 entries)		6	6	11	23

== Results ==
=== Semi-finals ===
Category	Winner	Runner-up	Score
Boys' singles	(Finland) Pontus Jäntti	(Denmark) Thomas Madsen	14–17, 15–8, 15–7
Boys' singles	(Denmark) Michael Søgaard	(Denmark) Johnny Sørensen	15–9, 12–15, 15–8
Girls' singles	(England) Joanne Muggeridge	(Scotland) Anne Gibson	11–2, 11–7
Girls' singles	(Denmark) Helle Andersen	(Sweden) Catrine Bengtsson	11–8, 4–11, 11–7
Boys' doubles	(Denmark) Jens Maibom (Denmark) Michael Søgaard	(Netherlands) Randy Trieling (Netherlands) Rob Stalenhoef	15–12, 18–14
Boys' doubles	(Denmark) Frederik Lindquist (Denmark) Thomas Olsen	(England) Andrew Fairhurst (England) Chris Hunt	17–15, 6–15, 15–12
Girls' doubles	(Sweden) Catrine Bengtsson (Sweden) Margit Borg	(Denmark) Charlotte Madsen (Denmark) Helle Andersen	15–6, 15–5
Girls' doubles	(England) Julie Munday (England) Tracy Dineen	(Denmark) Marlene Thomsen (Denmark) Trine Johansson	15–13, 15–13
Mixed doubles	(Denmark) Jens Maibom (Denmark) Charlotte Madsen	(Netherlands) Randy Trieling (Netherlands) Sonja Mellink	15–9, 15–4
Mixed doubles	(Sweden) Jonas Ericsson (Sweden) Margit Borg	(England) Richard Harmsworth (England) Tracy Dineen	15–6, 15–12

=== Finals ===
Category	Winners	Runners-up	Score
Boys' singles	(Finland) Pontus Jäntti	(Denmark) Michael Søgaard	15–5, 15–9
Girls' singles	(Denmark) Helle Andersen	(England) Joanne Muggeridge	8–11, 11–6, 11–6
Boys' doubles	(Denmark) Jens Maibom (Denmark) Michael Søgaard	(Denmark) Frederik Lindquist (Denmark) Thomas Olsen	17–15, 13–18, 15–8
Girls' doubles	(Sweden) Catrine Bengtsson (Sweden) Margit Borg	(England) Julie Munday (England) Tracy Dineen	15–4, 17–14
Mixed doubles	(Denmark) Jens Maibom (Denmark) Charlotte Madsen	(Sweden) Jonas Ericsson (Sweden) Margit Borg	4–15, 15–10, 18–14
