= 1963 Helvetia Cup =

Badminton event

1963 Helvetia Cup Cup der Nationen dei Badminton 1962
Tournament details
- Dates: 27 – 28 April
- Edition: 2
- Venue: Häberlstraße Sports Centre
- Location: Munich, West Germany

The 1963 Helvetia Cup (also known as the 1963 Badminton Cup of Nations) was the second edition of the Helvetia Cup mixed team badminton tournament. After Switzerland's success of hosting the first Helvetia Cup in 1962, Munich was named host of the second edition of the tournament in 1963.

The hosts West Germany defended their title after defeating an improving Austrian team by 7–1 in the final. In the playoff for third place, Belgium pulled off an upset by defeating runners-up of the last edition, the Netherlands.

== Tournament ==
The 1963 Helvetia Cup was scheduled to be held from 27 to 28 April 1963 with the participation of five countries in the Central European region, which were Austria, Belgium, the Netherlands, Switzerland and West Germany.

=== Venue ===
This tournament was held at the Häberlstraße Sports Centre in Munich, West Germany.

=== Draw ===
The draw was announced on 26 April 1963. The group stage consists of 2 groups, Group 1 and Group 2.

Group 1	Group 2
Belgium; West Germany; Switzerland	Austria; Netherlands

== Group stage ==
All times are Central European Time (UTC+01:00).

=== Group 1 ===
Pos	Team	Pld	W	L	MF	MA	MD	Pts	Qualification
1	West Germany (H)	2	2	0	16	0	+16	2	Final
2	Belgium	2	1	1	8	8	0	1	3rd–4th place
3	Switzerland	2	0	2	0	16	−16	0	

Source: e-newspaperarchives.ch
(H) Host

27 April 1963

West Germany	8–0	Belgium
Report

Häberlstraße Sports Centre, West Germany

27 April 1963

West Germany	8–0	Switzerland
Report

Häberlstraße Sports Centre, West Germany

27 April 1963

Belgium	8–0	Switzerland
Report

Häberlstraße Sports Centre, West Germany

=== Group 2 ===
Pos	Team	Pld	W	L	MF	MA	MD	Pts	Qualification
1	Austria	2	1	0	8	0	+8	1	Final
2	Netherlands	2	0	1	0	8	−8	0	3rd–4th place

Source: e-newspaperarchives.ch

27 April 1963

Netherlands	2–6	Austria
Report

Häberlstraße Sports Centre, West Germany

== Classification round ==
=== 3rd–4th place ===
Netherlands
4
Häberlstraße Sports Centre
28 April 1963

Belgium*
4*

			1	2	3
1	(Netherlands) (Belgium)	Cees Broedelet; Anton Verstoep
2	(Netherlands) (Belgium)	Lex Meijer; Roger van Meerbeek
3	(Netherlands) (Belgium)	Henk Weys; Herman Moens
4	(Netherlands) (Belgium)	Marloes van Swelm; Bep Verstoep
5	(Netherlands) (Belgium)	Lex Meijer / Pim Seth Paul; Herman Moens / Roger van Meerbeek
6	(Netherlands) (Belgium)	Huub van Ginneken / Henk Weys; Jack Stuart / Guy van Branteghem
7	(Netherlands) (Belgium)	Els Robbé / Wil Haye; June van der Willigen / Bep Verstoep
8	(Netherlands) (Belgium)	Pim Seth Paul / Marloes van Swelm; Anton Verstoep / June van der Willigen

* : Belgium won by game difference; 10–9.

=== Final ===
West Germany
7
Häberlstraße Sports Centre
28 April 1963

Austria
1

			1	2	3
1	(West Germany) (Austria)	Wolfgang Bochow; Reinhold Pum	15; 7	15; 9
2	(West Germany) (Austria)	Friedhelm Wulff; Heinz Ottmann	8; 15	15; 5	15; 4
3	(West Germany) (Austria)	Kurt Jendroska; Siegfried Jost	15; 2	15; 7
4	(West Germany) (Austria)	Irmgard Latz; Hilde Taupe	11; 0	11; 0
5	(West Germany) (Austria)	Peter Birtel / Friedhelm Wulff; Hermann Fröhlich / Reinhold Pum	15; 9	15; 7
6	(West Germany) (Austria)	Wolfgang Bochow / Jürgen Jipp; Bernd Frohnwieser / Heinz Ottmann	15; 3	15; 12
7	(West Germany) (Austria)	Irmgard Latz / Gerda Schumacher; Hilde Taupe / Hilde Themel	15; 3	15; 2
8	(West Germany) (Austria)	Jürgen Jipp / Annelie Hennen; Hermann Fröhlich / Lore Voit	7; 15	10; 15

1963 Helvetia Cup winner

West Germany
Second title

== Final ranking ==
Pos	Team	Pld	W	L	Pts	MD	Final result
1st place, gold medalist(s)	West Germany	3	3	0	3	+22	Champions
2nd place, silver medalist(s)	Austria	3	2	1	2	+6	Runners-up
3rd place, bronze medalist(s)	Belgium	3	2	1	2	0	Third place
4	Netherlands	2	0	2	0	−4	Fourth place
5	Switzerland (H)	2	0	2	0	−16	Eliminated in group stage
