= 1985 European Junior Badminton Championships =

Badminton championships

Tournament details
- Dates: 30 March – 6 April
- Edition: 9th
- Venue: Sacré Coeur Cloister Hall
- Location: Pressbaum, Austria

The 1985 European Junior Badminton Championships was the ninth edition of the European Junior Badminton Championships. It was held in Pressbaum, Austria, in the month of March and April. Denmark won all the titles except the boys' singles which was won by England.

== Medalists ==
Discipline	Gold	Silver	Bronze
Boys' singles	(England) Matthew Smith	(Denmark) Jan Paulsen	(Denmark) Peter Knudsen
Boys' singles	(England) Matthew Smith	(Denmark) Jan Paulsen	(Denmark) Lars Pedersen
Girls' singles	(Denmark) Lisbet Stuer-Lauridsen	(Denmark) Lotte Olsen	(Sweden) Charlotta Wihlborg
Girls' singles	(Denmark) Lisbet Stuer-Lauridsen	(Denmark) Lotte Olsen	(Germany) Katrin Schmidt
Boys' doubles	(Denmark) Jan Paulsen (Denmark) Lars Pedersen	(Denmark) Johnny Børglum (Denmark) Max Gandrup	(Norway) Hans Sperre Jr. (Norway) Jorn Myrestrand
Boys' doubles	(Denmark) Jan Paulsen (Denmark) Lars Pedersen	(Denmark) Johnny Børglum (Denmark) Max Gandrup	(Sweden) Peter Axelsson (Sweden) Mikael Lunqvist
Girls' doubles	(Denmark) Lisbet Stuer-Lauridsen (Denmark) Lotte Olsen	(England) Sara Halsall (England) Debbie Hore	(England) Claire Palmer (England) Cheryl Johnsson
Girls' doubles	(Denmark) Lisbet Stuer-Lauridsen (Denmark) Lotte Olsen	(England) Sara Halsall (England) Debbie Hore	(Denmark) Marian Christiansen (Denmark) Charlotte Jacobsen
Mixed doubles	(Denmark) Jan Paulsen (Denmark) Marian Christiansen	(Denmark) Max Gandrup (Denmark) Charlotte Jacobsen	(Scotland) Alan McMillan (Scotland) Aileen Nairn
Mixed doubles	(Denmark) Jan Paulsen (Denmark) Marian Christiansen	(Denmark) Max Gandrup (Denmark) Charlotte Jacobsen	(Soviet Union) Andrey Antropov (Soviet Union) Tatyana Volchek
Mixed team	Denmark; Johnny Børglum; Max Gandrup; Peter Knudsen; Jan Paulsen; Lars Pedersen; Marian Christiansen; Charlotte Jacobsen; Lotte Olsen; Lene Sørensen; Lisbet Stuer-Lauridsen	England; Adrian Casey; Paul Edevane; Paul Holden; Anders Nielsen; Matthew Smith; Debbie Hore; Sara Halsall; Cheryl Johnsson; Claire Palmer	Sweden; Peter Axelsson; Robert Larson; Mikael Lunqvist; Jörgen Tuvesson; Catrine Bengtsson; Camilla Källstrand; P. Ryman; Charlotta Wihlborg

== Results ==
=== Semi-finals ===
Category	Winner	Runner-up	Score
Boys' singles	(England) Matthew Smith	(Denmark) Lars Pedersen	15–3, 15–5
Boys' singles	(Denmark) Jan Paulsen	(Denmark) Peter Knudsen	15–11, 15–8
Girls' singles	(Denmark) Lotte Olsen	(Sweden) Charlotta Wihlborg	11–8, 8–11, 11–7
Girls' singles	(Denmark) Lisbet Stuer-Lauridsen	(Germany) Katrin Schmidt	11–5, 11–3
Boys' doubles	(Denmark) Jan Paulsen (Denmark) Lars Pedersen	(Norway) Hans Sperre Jr. (Norway) Jorn Myrestrand	18–15, 15–10
Boys' doubles	(Denmark) Johnny Børglum (Denmark) Max Gandrup	(Sweden) Mikael Lundquvist (Sweden) Peter Axelsson	15–6, 15–5
Girls' doubles	(Denmark) Lisbet Stuer-Lauridsen (Denmark) Lotte Olsen	(England) Cheryl Johnsson (England) Claire Palmer	15–11, 15–11
Girls' doubles	(England) Debbie Hore (England) Sara Halsall	(Denmark) Charlotte Jacobsen (Denmark) Marian Christiansen	17–14, 17–15
Mixed doubles	(Denmark) Jan Paulsen (Denmark) Marian Christiansen	(Scotland) Alan McMillan (Scotland) Aileen Nairn	15–6, 15–6
Mixed doubles	(Denmark) Max Gandrup (Denmark) Charlotte Jacobsen	(Soviet Union) Andrey Antropov (Soviet Union) Tatyana Volchek	15–5, 15–5

=== Final ===
Category	Winner	Runners-up	Score
Boys' singles	(England) Matthew Smith	(Denmark) Jan Paulsen	17–15, 15–10
Girls' singles	(Denmark) Lisbet Stuer-Lauridsen	(Denmark) Lotte Olsen	11–5, 11–6
Boys' doubles	(Denmark) Jan Paulsen (Denmark) Lars Pedersen	(Denmark) Johnny Børglum (Denmark) Max Gandrup	15–12, 9–15, 15–8
Girls' doubles	(Denmark) Lisbet Stuer-Lauridsen (Denmark) Lotte Olsen	(England) Debbie Hore (England) Sara Halsall	15–11, 9–15, 15–7
Mixed doubles	(Denmark) Jan Paulsen (Denmark) Marian Christiansen	(Denmark) Max Gandrup (Denmark) Charlotte Jacobsen	15–2, walkover

== Medal table ==
Rank	Nation	Gold	Silver	Bronze	Total
1	Denmark (DEN)	5	4	3	12
2	England (ENG)	1	2	1	4
3	Sweden (SWE)	0	0	3	3
4	Norway (NOR)	0	0	1	1
4	Scotland (SCO)	0	0	1	1
4	Soviet Union (SOV)	0	0	1	1
4	West Germany (FRG)	0	0	1	1
Totals (7 entries)		6	6	11	23
