= 1979 European Junior Badminton Championships =

Badminton championships

Tournament details
- Dates: 14 – 21 April 1979
- Edition: 6th
- Venue: Carl Diem Halle
- Location: Mülheim an der Ruhr, West Germany

The 1979 European Junior Badminton Championships was the 6th tournament of the European Junior Badminton Championships. It was held in Mülheim, Germany, in the month of April. Danish players won four titles, both the singles and Mixed doubles and Mixed team championships. While Sweden bagged boys' doubles title and England the girls' doubles gold.

== Medalists ==
Discipline	Gold	Silver	Bronze
Boys' singles	(Denmark) Jens Peter Nierhoff	(England) Nick Yates	(England) Steve Baddeley
Boys' singles	(Denmark) Jens Peter Nierhoff	(England) Nick Yates	(Soviet Union) Evgeniy Dayanov
Girls' singles	(Denmark) Kirsten Larsen	(Norway) Else Thoresen	(Denmark) Kirsten Meier
Girls' singles	(Denmark) Kirsten Larsen	(Norway) Else Thoresen	(England) Diane Simpson
Boys' doubles	(Sweden) Peter Isaksson (Sweden) Jan-Eric Antonsson	(West Germany) Harald Klauer (West Germany) Gerhard Treitinger	(Denmark) Jesper Knudsen (Denmark) Torben Kjær
Boys' doubles	(Sweden) Peter Isaksson (Sweden) Jan-Eric Antonsson	(West Germany) Harald Klauer (West Germany) Gerhard Treitinger	(England) Nick Yates (England) Christopher Back
Girls' doubles	(England) Sally Leadbeater (England) Gillian Clark	(Denmark) Charlotte Pilgaard (Denmark) Bettina Kristensen	(Denmark) Kirsten Larsen (Denmark) Kirsten Meier
Girls' doubles	(England) Sally Leadbeater (England) Gillian Clark	(Denmark) Charlotte Pilgaard (Denmark) Bettina Kristensen	(England) Diane Simpson (England) Christine Dickinson
Mixed doubles	(Denmark) Jens Peter Nierhoff (Denmark) Charlotte Pilgaard	(Sweden) Peter Isaksson (Sweden) Lena Axelsson	(Netherlands) Frank van Dongen (Netherlands) Grace Kakiay
Mixed doubles	(Denmark) Jens Peter Nierhoff (Denmark) Charlotte Pilgaard	(Sweden) Peter Isaksson (Sweden) Lena Axelsson	(Sweden) Jan-Eric Antonsson (Sweden) Ann Sofi Bergman
Mixed team	Denmark; Jens Peter Nierhoff; Kirsten Larsen; Jesper Knudsen; Torben Kjær; Charlotte Pilgaard; Bettina Kristensen; Bent Svenningsen; Kirsten Meier; Mark Christiansen; Michael Kjeldsen	England; Gillian Clark; Nick Yates; Diane Simpson; Stephen Baddeley; Donald Burden; Sally Leadbeater; Christopher Back	Sweden; Peter Isaksson; Lena Axelsson; Jan-Eric Antonsson; Ann-Sofi Bergmann; Klaus-Gunnar Jöhnsson; Christine Magnusson; Maria Bengtsson

== Results ==
=== Semi-finals ===
Category	Winner	Runner-up	Score
Boys' singles	(Denmark) Jens Peter Nierhoff	(England) Steve Baddeley	15–8, 15–9
Boys' singles	(England) Nick Yates	(Soviet Union) Evgeniy Dayanov	15–9, 15–7
Girls' singles	(Norway) Else Thoresen	(Denmark) Kirsten Meier	10–12, 11–6, 11–1
Girls' singles	(Denmark) Kirsten Larsen	(England) Diane Simpson	11–6, 11–6
Boys' doubles	(West Germany) Harald Klauer (West Germany) Gerhard Treitinger	(Denmark) Torben Kjær (Denmark) Jesper Knudsen	15–9, 15–4
Boys' doubles	(Sweden) Jan-Eric Antonsson (Sweden) Peter Isaksson	(England) Christopher Back (England) Nick Yates	15–13, 15–10
Girls' doubles	(England) Gillian Clark (England) Sally Leadbeater	(Denmark) Kirsten Larsen (Denmark) Kirsten Meier	15–9, 15–4
Girls' doubles	(Denmark) Charlotte Pilgaard (Denmark) Bettina Kristensen	(England) Christine Dickinson (England) Diane Simpson	15–10, 15–7
Mixed doubles	(Denmark) Jens Peter Nierhoff (Denmark) Charlotte Pilgaard	(Netherlands) Frank van Dongen (Netherlands) Grace Kakiay	15–7, 15–6
Mixed doubles	(Sweden) Peter Isaksson (Sweden) Lena Axelsson	(Sweden) Jan-Eric Antonsson (Sweden) Ann Sofi Bergman	15–10, 15–12

=== Finals ===
Discipline	Winner	Runner-up	Score
Boys' singles	(Denmark) Jens Peter Nierhoff	(England) Nick Yates	17–16, 15–1
Girls' singles	(Denmark) Kirsten Larsen	(Norway) Else Thoresen	11–2, 11–4
Boys' doubles	(Sweden) Peter Isaksson (Sweden) Jan-Eric Antonsson	(West Germany) Harald Klauer (West Germany) Gerhard Treitinger	15–9, 16–17, 15–0
Girls' doubles	(England) Sally Leadbeater (England) Gillian Clark	(Denmark) Charlotte Pilgaard (Denmark) Bettina Kristensen	15–12, 15–9
Mixed doubles	(Denmark) Jens Peter Nierhoff (Denmark) Charlotte Pilgaard	(Sweden) Peter Isaksson (Sweden) Lena Axelsson	15-7, 15-7

== Medal table ==
Rank	Nation	Gold	Silver	Bronze	Total
1	Denmark (DEN)	4	1	3	8
2	England (ENG)	1	2	4	7
3	Sweden (SWE)	1	1	2	4
4	Norway (NOR)	0	1	0	1
4	West Germany (FRG)	0	1	0	1
6	Netherlands (NED)	0	0	1	1
6	Soviet Union (URS)	0	0	1	1
Totals (7 entries)		6	6	11	23
