= 2010 European Women's Team Badminton Championships group stage =

This article lists the full results for group stage of 2010 European Women's Team Badminton Championships. The group stage was held from 16 to 18 February 2010.

== Group A ==
Pos	Team	Pld	W	L	MF	MA	MD	GF	GA	GD	PF	PA	PD	Pts	Qualification	Denmark	Czech Republic	Estonia	Greece
1	Denmark	3	3	0	15	0	+15	30	0	+30	630	319	+311	3	Knockout stage	—	5–0	5–0	5–0
2	Czech Republic	3	2	1	9	6	+3	18	14	+4	553	517	+36	2			—	4–1	5–0
3	Estonia	3	1	2	6	9	−3	14	18	−4	542	550	−8	1				—	5–0
4	Greece	3	0	3	0	15	−15	0	30	−30	291	630	−339	0					—

Source: BWF

=== Denmark vs. Greece ===
Denmark
5
Arena Ursynów, Court 5
16 February 2010, 10:00 UTC+1

Greece
0

			1	2	3
1	(Denmark) (Greece)	Tine Rasmussen; Theodora Ligomenou	21; 10	21; 8
2	(Denmark) (Greece)	Camilla Sørensen; Ioanna Karkantzia	21; 8	21; 4
3	(Denmark) (Greece)	Karina Jørgensen; Evgenia Vaggeli	21; 6	21; 7
4	(Denmark) (Greece)	Lena Frier Kristiansen / Marie Røpke; Ioanna Karkantzia / Theodora Ligomenou	21; 8	21; 6
5	(Denmark) (Greece)	Line Damkjær Kruse / Helle Nielsen; Elisavet Nioti / Evgenia Vaggeli	21; 2	21; 7

=== Estonia vs. Czech Republic ===
Estonia
1
Arena Ursynów, Court 10
16 February 2010, 10:00 UTC+1

Czech Republic
4

			1	2	3
1	(Estonia) (Czech Republic)	Karoliine Hõim; Kristína Ludíková	9; 21	21; 18	17; 21
2	(Estonia) (Czech Republic)	Laura Vana; Zuzana Pavelková	21; 10	21; 13
3	(Estonia) (Czech Republic)	Karoliine Hõim / Laura Vana; Alžběta Bášová / Kristína Ludíková	9; 21	15; 21
4	(Estonia) (Czech Republic)	Getter Saar; Lucie Havlová	19; 21	18; 21
5	(Estonia) (Czech Republic)	Kertu Margus / Gerda Teder; Lucie Havlová / Zuzana Pavelková	16; 21	21; 13	13; 21

=== Denmark vs. Estonia ===
Denmark
5
Arena Ursynów, Court 6
17 February 2010, 10:00 UTC+1

Estonia
0

			1	2	3
1	(Denmark) (Estonia)	Camilla Sørensen; Karoliine Hõim	21; 12	21; 17
2	(Denmark) (Estonia)	Karina Jørgensen; Laura Vana	21; 17	21; 18
3	(Denmark) (Estonia)	Helle Nielsen; Getter Saar	21; 11	21; 17
4	(Denmark) (Estonia)	Kamilla Rytter Juhl / Line Damkjær Kruse; Kertu Margus / Gerda Teder	21; 9	21; 9
5	(Denmark) (Estonia)	Lena Frier Kristiansen / Marie Røpke; Karoliine Hõim / Laura Vana	21; 8	21; 14

=== Greece vs. Czech Republic ===
Greece
0
Arena Ursynów, Court 5
17 February 2010, 10:00 UTC+1

Czech Republic
5

			1	2	3
1	(Greece) (Czech Republic)	Theodora Ligomenou; Kristína Ludíková	12; 21	8; 21
2	(Greece) (Czech Republic)	Ioanna Karkantzia; Zuzana Pavelková	12; 21	18; 21
3	(Greece) (Czech Republic)	Elisavet Nioti; Lucie Havlová	5; 21	8; 21
4	(Greece) (Czech Republic)	Ioanna Karkantzia / Theodora Ligomenou; Alžběta Bášová / Kristína Ludíková	13; 21	5; 21
5	(Greece) (Czech Republic)	Elisavet Nioti / Evgenia Vaggeli; Lucie Havlová / Zuzana Pavelková	14; 21	12; 21

=== Greece vs. Estonia ===
Greece
0
Arena Ursynów, Court 1
18 February 2010, 14:00 UTC+1

Estonia
5

			1	2	3
1	(Greece) (Estonia)	Theodora Ligomenou; Karoliine Hõim	11; 21	14; 21
2	(Greece) (Estonia)	Ioanna Karkantzia; Laura Vana	12; 21	12; 21
3	(Greece) (Estonia)	Elisavet Nioti; Getter Saar	10; 21	12; 21
4	(Greece) (Estonia)	Ioanna Karkantzia / Theodora Ligomenou; Karoliine Hõim / Laura Vana	13; 21	12; 21
5	(Greece) (Estonia)	Elisavet Nioti / Evgenia Vaggeli; Kertu Margus / Gerda Teder	10; 21	12; 21

=== Denmark vs. Czech Republic ===
Denmark
5
Arena Ursynów, Court 3
18 February 2010, 14:00 UTC+1

Czech Republic
0

			1	2	3
1	(Denmark) (Czech Republic)	Tine Rasmussen; Kristína Ludíková	21; 13	21; 16
2	(Denmark) (Czech Republic)	Camilla Sørensen; Zuzana Pavelková	21; 4	21; 15
3	(Denmark) (Czech Republic)	Karina Jørgensen; Lucie Havlová	21; 13	21; 19
4	(Denmark) (Czech Republic)	Lena Frier Kristiansen / Kamilla Rytter Juhl; Alžběta Bášová / Kristina Gavnholt	21; 9	21; 10
5	(Denmark) (Czech Republic)	Helle Nielsen / Marie Røpke; Lucie Havlová / Zuzana Pavelková	21; 11	21; 11

== Group B ==
Pos	Team	Pld	W	L	MF	MA	MD	GF	GA	GD	PF	PA	PD	Pts	Qualification	Netherlands	Belgium	Belarus	Finland	Latvia
1	Netherlands	4	4	0	18	2	+16	38	4	+34	872	543	+329	4	Knockout stage	—	4–1	4–1	5–0	5–0
2	Belgium	4	3	1	14	6	+8	30	15	+15	852	758	+94	3			—	3–2	5–0	5–0
3	Belarus	4	2	2	11	9	+2	24	23	+1	813	850	−37	2				—	3–2	5–0
4	Finland	4	1	3	6	14	−8	14	31	−17	766	837	−71	1					—	4–1
5	Latvia	4	0	4	1	19	−18	5	38	−33	564	879	−315	0						—

Source: BWF

=== Finland vs. Belarus ===
Finland
2
Arena Ursynów, Court 1
16 February 2010, 10:00 UTC+1

Belarus
3

			1	2	3
1	(Finland) (Belarus)	Saara Hynninen; Alesia Zaitsava	9; 21	16; 21
2	(Finland) (Belarus)	Airi Mikkelä; Viktoriya Varabyova	17; 21	21; 7	21; 17
3	(Finland) (Belarus)	Jenny Nyström; Vlada Chernyavskaya	21; 17	17; 21	21; 13
4	(Finland) (Belarus)	Saara Hynninen / Sanni Rautala; Vlada Chernyavskaya / Alesia Zaitsava	17; 21	18; 21
5	(Finland) (Belarus)	Mathilda Lindholm / Jenny Nyström; Kristina Silich / Viktoriya Vorobeva	21; 19	18; 21	17; 21

=== Netherlands vs. Latvia ===
Netherlands
5
Arena Ursynów, Court 2
16 February 2010, 10:00 UTC+1

Latvia
0

			1	2	3
1	(Netherlands) (Latvia)	Patty Stolzenbach; Aija Pope	21; 6	21; 12
2	(Netherlands) (Latvia)	Yik-Man Wong; Kristīne Šefere	22; 20	21; 18
3	(Netherlands) (Latvia)	Lotte Jonathans / Paulien van Dooremalen; Aija Pope / Ieva Pope	21; 11	21; 11
4	(Netherlands) (Latvia)	Iris Tabeling; Alesja Hodakovska	21; 4	21; 3
5	(Netherlands) (Latvia)	Samantha Barning / Selena Piek; Monika Radovska / Kristīne Šefere	21; 5	21; 10

=== Belarus vs. Belgium ===
Belarus
2
Arena Ursynów, Court 1
16 February 2010, 18:00 UTC+1

Belgium
3

			1	2	3
1	(Belarus) (Belgium)	Alesia Zaitsava; Lianne Tan	14; 21	19; 21
2	(Belarus) (Belgium)	Viktoriya Varabyova; Stefanie Bertels	15; 21	12; 21
3	(Belarus) (Belgium)	Vlada Chernyavskaya; Debbie Janssens	21; 15	13; 21	21; 15
4	(Belarus) (Belgium)	Vlada Chernyavskaya / Alesia Zaitsava; Steffi Annys / Séverine Corvilain	15; 21	21; 18	21; 14
5	(Belarus) (Belgium)	Kristina Silich / Viktoriya Varabyova; Debbie Janssens / Lianne Tan	13; 21	18; 21

=== Latvia vs. Finland ===
Latvia
1
Arena Ursynów, Court 6
16 February 2010, 18:00 UTC+1

Finland
4

			1	2	3
1	(Latvia) (Finland)	Aija Pope; Saara Hynninen	7; 21	8; 21
2	(Latvia) (Finland)	Kristīne Šefere; Airi Mikkelä	21; 14	21; 18
3	(Latvia) (Finland)	Monika Radovska; Jenny Nyström	15; 21	9; 21
4	(Latvia) (Finland)	Aija Pope / Ieva Pope; Saara Hynninen / Airi Mikkelä	14; 21	16; 21
5	(Latvia) (Finland)	Monika Radovska / Kristīne Šefere; Mathilda Lindholm / Jenny Nyström	21; 15	9; 21	19; 21

=== Latvia vs. Belgium ===
Latvia
0
Arena Ursynów, Court 2
17 February 2010, 14:00 UTC+1

Belgium
5

			1	2	3
1	(Latvia) (Belgium)	Aija Pope; Lianne Tan	10; 21	10; 21
2	(Latvia) (Belgium)	Kristīne Šefere; Stefanie Bertels	21; 18	17; 21	16; 21
3	(Latvia) (Belgium)	Ieva Pope; Debbie Janssens	10; 21	10; 21
4	(Latvia) (Belgium)	Aija Pope / Monika Radovska; Steffi Annys / Séverine Corvilain	13; 21	14; 21
5	(Latvia) (Belgium)	Aļesja Hodakovska / Kristīne Šefere; Stefanie Bertels / Lianne Tan	8; 21	15; 21

=== Netherlands vs. Finland ===
Netherlands
5
Arena Ursynów, Court 6
17 February 2010, 14:00 UTC+1

Finland
0

			1	2	3
1	(Netherlands) (Finland)	Patty Stolzenbach; Saara Hynninen	21; 18	21; 19
2	(Netherlands) (Finland)	Thamar Peters; Airi Mikkelä	21; 13	21; 16
3	(Netherlands) (Finland)	Iris Tabeling; Jenny Nyström	21; 10	21; 11
4	(Netherlands) (Finland)	Lotte Jonathans / Paulien van Dooremalen; Saara Hynninen / Airi Mikkelä	21; 17	21; 10
5	(Netherlands) (Finland)	Samantha Barning / Selena Piek; Mathilda Lindholm / Jenny Nyström	21; 12	21; 5

=== Netherlands vs. Belarus ===
Netherlands
4
Arena Ursynów, Court 2
18 February 2010, 10:00 UTC+1

Belarus
1

			1	2	3
1	(Netherlands) (Belarus)	Patty Stolzenbach; Alesia Zaitsava	21; 13	21; 16
2	(Netherlands) (Belarus)	Thamar Peters; Viktoriya Varabyova	20; 22	21; 14	17; 21
3	(Netherlands) (Belarus)	Iris Tabeling; Kristina Silich	21; 7	21; 16
4	(Netherlands) (Belarus)	Lotte Jonathans / Paulien van Dooremalen; Vlada Chernyavskaya / Alesia Zaitsava	21; 11	21; 7
5	(Netherlands) (Belarus)	Samantha Barning / Selena Piek; Kristina Silich / Viktoryia Varabyova	21; 9	21; 8

=== Finland vs. Belgium ===
Finland
0
Arena Ursynów, Court 7
18 February 2010, 10:00 UTC+1

Belgium
5

			1	2	3
1	(Finland) (Belgium)	Saara Hyyninen; Lianne Tan	17; 21	11; 21
2	(Finland) (Belgium)	Airi Mikkelä; Stefanie Bertels	16; 21	21; 13	16; 21
3	(Finland) (Belgium)	Jenny Nyström; Debbie Janssens	19; 21	18; 21
4	(Finland) (Belgium)	Airi Mikkelä / Sanni Rautala; Steffi Annys / Séverine Corvilain	14; 21	15; 21
5	(Finland) (Belgium)	Jenny Nyström / Mathilda Lindholm; Stefanie Bertels / Debbie Janssens	22; 24	17; 21

=== Latvia vs. Belarus ===
Latvia
0
Arena Ursynów, Court 1
18 February 2010, 18:00 UTC+1

Belarus
5

			1	2	3
1	(Latvia) (Belarus)	Kristīne Šefere; Alesia Zaitsava	21; 15	14; 21	19; 21
2	(Latvia) (Belarus)	Ieva Pope; Viktoriya Varabyova	12; 21	14; 21
3	(Latvia) (Belarus)	Monika Radovska; Vlada Chernyavskaya	14; 21	10; 21
4	(Latvia) (Belarus)	Aija Pope / Kristīne Šefere; Vlada Chernyavskaya / Alesia Zaitsava	13; 21	15; 21
5	(Latvia) (Belarus)	Ieva Pope / Monika Radovska; Kristina Silich / Viktoriya Varabyova	17; 21	11; 21

=== Netherlands vs. Belgium ===
Netherlands
4
Arena Ursynów, Court 2
18 February 2010, 18:00 UTC+1

Belgium
1

			1	2	3
1	(Netherlands) (Belgium)	Patty Stolzenbach; Lianne Tan	21; 12	21; 17
2	(Netherlands) (Belgium)	Thamar Peters; Stefanie Bertels	16; 21	21; 18	20; 22
3	(Netherlands) (Belgium)	Iris Tabeling; Debbie Janssens	21; 15	21; 14
4	(Netherlands) (Belgium)	Lotte Jonathans / Paulien van Dooremalen; Steffi Annys / Séverine Corvilain	21; 14	21; 13
5	(Netherlands) (Belgium)	Samantha Barning / Selena Piek; Stefanie Bertels / Debbie Janssens	21; 16	21; 6

== Group C ==
Pos	Team	Pld	W	L	MF	MA	MD	GF	GA	GD	PF	PA	PD	Pts	Qualification	Russia	England	Portugal	Croatia
1	Russia	3	3	0	14	1	+13	28	5	+23	663	436	+227	3	Knockout stage	—	4–1	5–0	5–0
2	England	3	2	1	11	4	+7	24	9	+15	629	513	+116	2			—	5–0	5–0
3	Portugal	3	1	2	3	12	−9	8	25	−17	478	618	−140	1				—	3–2
4	Croatia	3	0	3	2	13	−11	7	28	−21	484	687	−203	0					—

Source: BWF

=== Croatia vs. England ===
Croatia
0
Arena Ursynów, Court 1
16 February 2010, 14:00 UTC+1

England
5

			1	2	3
1	(Croatia) (England)	Andrea Žvorc; Elizabeth Cann	18; 21	8; 21
2	(Croatia) (England)	Petra Petranović; Helen Davies	12; 21	6; 21
3	(Croatia) (England)	Staša Poznanović; Rachel Howard	15; 21	15; 21
4	(Croatia) (England)	Petra Petranović / Andrea Žvorc; Mariana Agathangelou / Heather Olver	12; 21	11; 21
5	(Croatia) (England)	Matea Čiča / Staša Poznanović; Jenny Wallwork / Gabby White	21; 15	15; 21	13; 21

=== Russia vs. Portugal ===
Russia
5
Arena Ursynów, Court 2
16 February 2010, 14:00 UTC+1

Portugal
0

			1	2	3
1	(Russia) (Portugal)	Ella Diehl; Telma Santos	21; 16	21; 8
2	(Russia) (Portugal)	Tatjana Bibik; Helena Pestana	21; 8	21; 6
3	(Russia) (Portugal)	Olga Golovanova; Vânia Leça	21; 18	21; 18
4	(Russia) (Portugal)	Valeria Sorokina / Nina Vislova; Cláudia Figueira / Helena Pestana	21; 3	21; 5
5	(Russia) (Portugal)	Ksenia Polikarpova / Anastasia Russkikh; Vânia Leça / Telma Santos	21; 11	21; 9

=== Russia vs. Croatia ===
Russia
5
Arena Ursynów, Court 2
17 February 2010, 18:00 UTC+1

Croatia
0

			1	2	3
1	(Russia) (Croatia)	Ella Diehl; Andrea Žvorc	21; 14	21; 13
2	(Russia) (Croatia)	Anastasia Prokopenko; Petra Petranović	21; 15	21; 8
3	(Russia) (Croatia)	Ksenia Polikarpova; Matea Čiča	21; 19	10; 21	21; 16
4	(Russia) (Croatia)	Olga Golovanova / Tatjana Bibik; Petra Petranović / Andrea Žvorc	21; 10	21; 6
5	(Russia) (Croatia)	Valeria Sorokina / Nina Vislova; Matea Čiča / Staša Poznanović	21; 6	21; 12

=== Portugal vs. England ===
Portugal
0
Arena Ursynów, Court 8
17 February 2010, 18:00 UTC+1

England
5

			1	2	3
1	(Portugal) (England)	Telma Santos; Elizabeth Cann	17; 21	8; 21
2	(Portugal) (England)	Helena Pestana; Helen Davies	12; 21	19; 21
3	(Portugal) (England)	Vânia Leça; Kate Robertshaw	17; 21	13; 21
4	(Portugal) (England)	Cláudia Figueira / Helena Pestana; Jenny Wallwork / Gabby White	14; 21	5; 21
5	(Portugal) (England)	Telma Santos / Vânia Leça; Mariana Agathangelou / Heather Olver	14; 21	15; 21

=== Portugal vs. Croatia ===
Portugal
3
Arena Ursynów, Court 6
18 February 2010, 14:00 UTC+1

Croatia
2

			1	2	3
1	(Portugal) (Croatia)	Telma Santos; Andrea Žvorc	22; 24	21; 16	21; 10
2	(Portugal) (Croatia)	Helena Pestana; Staša Poznanović	21; 7	21; 9
3	(Portugal) (Croatia)	Vânia Leça; Matea Čiča	16; 21	21; 19	15; 21
4	(Portugal) (Croatia)	Cláudia Figueiredo / Helena Pestana; Matea Čiča / Staša Poznanović	11; 21	21; 10	21; 11
5	(Portugal) (Croatia)	Telma Santos / Vânia Leça; Petra Petranović / Andrea Žvorc	21; 6	21; 12

=== Russia vs. England ===
Russia
4
Arena Ursynów, Court 9
18 February 2010, 14:00 UTC+1

England
1

			1	2	3
1	(Russia) (England)	Ella Diehl; Elizabeth Cann	21; 10	17; 21	21; 11
2	(Russia) (England)	Tatjana Bibik; Rachel Howard	21; 18	21; 10
3	(Russia) (England)	Nina Vislova; Kate Robertshaw	21; 23	21; 17	21; 12
4	(Russia) (England)	Ksenia Polikarpova / Anastasia Russkikh; Mariana Agathangelou / Heather Olver	9; 21	18; 21
5	(Russia) (England)	Valeria Sorokina / Nina Vislova; Jenny Wallwork / Gabby White	21; 15	21; 16

== Group D ==
Pos	Team	Pld	W	L	MF	MA	MD	GF	GA	GD	PF	PA	PD	Pts	Qualification	Germany	Spain	Iceland	Sweden
1	Germany	3	3	0	14	1	+13	29	4	+25	678	425	+253	3	Knockout stage	—	4–1	5–0	5–0
2	Spain	3	1	2	6	9	−3	14	19	−5	558	626	−68	1			—	3–2	2–3
3	Iceland	3	1	2	6	9	−3	12	22	−10	555	664	−109	1				—	4–1
4	Sweden	3	1	2	4	11	−7	12	22	−10	565	641	−76	1					—

Source: BWF

=== Germany vs. Iceland ===
Germany
5
Arena Ursynów, Court 4
16 February 2010, 14:00 UTC+1

Iceland
0

			1	2	3
1	(Germany) (Iceland)	Juliane Schenk; Ragna Ingólfsdóttir	21; 9	21; 11
2	(Germany) (Iceland)	Karin Schnaase; Tinna Helgadóttir	21; 12	21; 9
3	(Germany) (Iceland)	Johanna Goliszewski / Carla Nelte; Snjólaug Jóhannsdóttir / Karitas Ósk Ólafsdóttir	21; 13	21; 6
4	(Germany) (Iceland)	Fabienne Deprez; Rakel Jóhannesdóttir	21; 14	21; 11
5	(Germany) (Iceland)	Sandra Marinello / Birgit Overzier; Tinna Helgadóttir / Ragna Ingólfsdóttir	21; 17	21; 9

=== Spain vs. Sweden ===
Spain
2
Arena Ursynów, Court 5
16 February 2010, 14:00 UTC+1

Sweden
3

			1	2	3
1	(Spain) (Sweden)	Carolina Marín; Sophia Hansson	21; 16	21; 15
2	(Spain) (Sweden)	Beatriz Corrales; Jessica Carlsson	21; 17	21; 16
3	(Spain) (Sweden)	Ana María Martín / Carolina Martínez; Emelie Lennartsson / Emma Wengberg	8; 21	11; 21
4	(Spain) (Sweden)	Laura Molina; Ellinor Widh	18; 21	18; 21
5	(Spain) (Sweden)	Sandra Chirlaque / Beatriz Corrales; Cecilia Bjuner / Amanda Högström	16; 21	10; 21

=== Iceland vs. Sweden ===
Iceland
4
Arena Ursynów, Court 7
17 February 2010, 10:00 UTC+1

Sweden
1

			1	2	3
1	(Iceland) (Sweden)	Ragna Ingólfsdóttir; Sophia Hansson	22; 20	21; 17
2	(Iceland) (Sweden)	Tinna Helgadóttir; Jessica Carlsson	21; 18	11; 21	21; 16
3	(Iceland) (Sweden)	Snjólaug Jóhannsdóttir; Ellinor Widh	18; 21	15; 21
4	(Iceland) (Sweden)	Tinna Helgadóttir / Ragna Ingólfsdóttir; Emelie Lennartsson / Emma Wengberg	21; 14	16; 21	21; 17
5	(Iceland) (Sweden)	Snjólaug Jóhannsdóttir / Karitas Ósk Ólafsdóttir; Cecilia Bjuner / Amanda Högström	20; 22	21; 18	21; 16

=== Spain vs. Germany ===
Spain
1
Arena Ursynów, Court 9
17 February 2010, 10:00 UTC+1

Germany
4

			1	2	3
1	(Spain) (Germany)	Sandra Chirlaque; Juliane Schenk	4; 21	7; 21
2	(Spain) (Germany)	Carolina Marín; Karin Schnaase	21; 18	19; 21	21; 12
3	(Spain) (Germany)	Beatriz Corrales; Carola Bott	20; 22	21; 19	21; 23
4	(Spain) (Germany)	Ana María Martín / Laura Molina; Sandra Marinello / Birgit Overzier	10; 21	8; 21
5	(Spain) (Germany)	Sandra Chirlaque / Beatriz Corrales; Johanna Goliszewski / Carla Nelte	12; 21	17; 21

=== Iceland vs. Spain ===
Iceland
2
Arena Ursynów, Court 7
18 February 2010, 14:00 UTC+1

Spain
3

			1	2	3
1	(Iceland) (Spain)	Ragna Ingólfsdóttir; Carolina Marín	19; 21	22; 24
2	(Iceland) (Spain)	Karitas Ósk Ólafsdóttir; Beatriz Corrales	9; 21	12; 21
3	(Iceland) (Spain)	Tinna Helgadóttir; Laura Molina	21; 11	21; 18
4	(Iceland) (Spain)	Ragna Ingólfsdóttir / Karitas Ósk Ólafsdóttir; Ana María Martín / Laura Molina	21; 15	18; 21	21; 18
5	(Iceland) (Spain)	Tinna Helgadóttir / Snjólaug Jóhannsdóttir; Sandra Chirlaque / Beatriz Corrales	17; 21	14; 21

=== Germany vs. Sweden ===
Germany
5
Arena Ursynów, Court 10
18 February 2010, 14:00 UTC+1

Sweden
0

			1	2	3
1	(Germany) (Sweden)	Juliane Schenk; Sophia Hansson	21; 8	21; 4
2	(Germany) (Sweden)	Karin Schnaase; Ellinor Widh	21; 8	21; 11
3	(Germany) (Sweden)	Fabienne Deprez; Emelie Lennartsson	21; 14	17; 21	21; 15
4	(Germany) (Sweden)	Johanna Goliszewski / Juliane Schenk; Cecilia Bjuner / Amanda Högström	21; 10	21; 15
5	(Germany) (Sweden)	Birgit Overzier / Carla Nelte; Emelie Lennartsson / Emma Wengberg	21; 14	21; 13

== Group E ==
Pos	Team	Pld	W	L	MF	MA	MD	GF	GA	GD	PF	PA	PD	Pts	Qualification	Scotland	France	Ukraine	Poland
1	Scotland	3	2	1	11	4	+7	20	13	+7	622	599	+23	2	Knockout stage	—	3–2	2–3	4–1
2	France	3	2	1	9	6	+3	22	13	+9	655	599	+56	2			—	5–0	4–1
3	Ukraine	3	1	2	5	10	−5	15	22	−7	644	671	−27	1				—	2–3
4	Poland (H)	3	1	2	5	10	−5	12	21	−9	555	607	−52	1					—

Source: BWF
(H) Host

=== Scotland vs. Ukraine ===
Scotland
2
Arena Ursynów, Court 6
16 February 2010, 14:00 UTC+1

Ukraine
3

			1	2	3
1	(Scotland) (Ukraine)	Susan Egelstaff; Larisa Griga	19; 21	21; 15	19; 21
2	(Scotland) (Ukraine)	Linda Sloan; Mariya Diptan	18; 21	21; 11	21; 18
3	(Scotland) (Ukraine)	Imogen Bankier / Emma Mason; Anna Kondratieva / Elena Prus	21; 12	21; 14
4	(Scotland) (Ukraine)	Kirsty Gilmour; Marija Ulitina	22; 20	11; 21	9; 21
5	(Scotland) (Ukraine)	Jillie Cooper / Linda Sloan; Mariya Diptan / Larisa Griga	13; 21	20; 22

=== France vs. Poland ===
France
4
Arena Ursynów, Court 9
16 February 2010, 14:00 UTC+1

Poland
1

			1	2	3
1	(France) (Poland)	Pi Hongyan; Anna Narel	21; 9	21; 11
2	(France) (Poland)	Élisa Chanteur; Natalia Pocztowiak	17; 21	21; 10	21; 18
3	(France) (Poland)	Perrine Le Buhanic; Małgorzata Kurdelska	21; 17	21; 10
4	(France) (Poland)	Laura Choinet / Weny Rahmawati; Natalia Pocztowiak / Agnieszka Wojtkowska	14; 21	21; 19	21; 18
5	(France) (Poland)	Élisa Chanteur / Pi Hongyan; Nadieżda Kostiuczyk / Małgorzata Kurdelska	8; 21	11; 21

=== Poland vs. Ukraine ===
Poland
3
Arena Ursynów, Court 7
17 February 2010, 18:00 UTC+1

Ukraine
2

			1	2	3
1	(Poland) (Ukraine)	Anna Narel; Larisa Griga	10; 21	11; 21
2	(Poland) (Ukraine)	Ewa Jarocka; Elena Prus	11; 21	13; 21
3	(Poland) (Ukraine)	Małgorzata Kurdelska; Mariya Diptan	21; 17	16; 21	21; 18
4	(Poland) (Ukraine)	Natalia Pocztowiak / Agnieszka Wojtkowska; Anna Kobceva / Olga Pyvovarova	21; 16	21; 17
5	(Poland) (Ukraine)	Nadieżda Kostiuczyk / Małgorzata Kurdelska; Elena Prus / Mariya Diptan	21; 15	21; 8

=== France vs. Scotland ===
France
2
Arena Ursynów, Court 9
17 February 2010, 18:00 UTC+1

Scotland
3

			1	2	3
1	(France) (Scotland)	Pi Hongyan; Susan Egelstaff	21; 15	21; 8
2	(France) (Scotland)	Élisa Chanteur; Linda Sloan	15; 21	23; 25
3	(France) (Scotland)	Laura Choinet / Weny Rahmawati; Imogen Bankier / Emma Mason	11; 21	16; 21
4	(France) (Scotland)	Perrine Le Buhanic; Kirsty Gilmour	21; 16	24; 22
5	(France) (Scotland)	Audrey Fontaine / Pi Hongyan; Jillie Cooper / Linda Sloan	21; 23	16; 21

=== Poland vs. Scotland ===
Poland
1
Arena Ursynów, Court 8
18 February 2010, 14:00 UTC+1

Scotland
4

			1	2	3
1	(Poland) (Scotland)	Anna Narel; Susan Egelstaff	19; 21	11; 21
2	(Poland) (Scotland)	Natalia Pocztowiak; Linda Sloan	23; 25	18; 21
3	(Poland) (Scotland)	Angelika Węgrzyn; Kirsty Gilmour	15; 21	14; 21
4	(Poland) (Scotland)	Natalia Pocztowiak / Agnieszka Wojtkowska; Imogen Bankier / Emma Mason	14; 21	16; 21
5	(Poland) (Scotland)	Nadieżda Kostiuczyk / Małgorzata Kurdelska; Jillie Cooper / Linda Sloan	21; 8	21; 13

=== France vs. Ukraine ===
France
5
Arena Ursynów, Court 7
18 February 2010, 18:00 UTC+1

Ukraine
0

			1	2	3
1	(France) (Ukraine)	Pi Hongyan; Larisa Griga	21; 10	21; 14
2	(France) (Ukraine)	Élisa Chanteur; Elena Prus	21; 17	16; 21	21; 19
3	(France) (Ukraine)	Perrine Le Buhanic; Mariya Diptan	21; 11	21; 12
4	(France) (Ukraine)	Laura Choinet / Weny Rahmawati; Anna Kobceva / Elena Prus	16; 21	21; 15	21; 15
5	(France) (Ukraine)	Audrey Fontaine / Pi Hongyan; Mariya Diptan / Larisa Griga	6; 21	21; 16	21; 18

== Group F ==
Pos	Team	Pld	W	L	MF	MA	MD	GF	GA	GD	PF	PA	PD	Pts	Qualification	Bulgaria	Wales	Slovakia	Hungary
1	Bulgaria	3	3	0	15	0	+15	30	0	+30	630	297	+333	3	Knockout stage	—	5–0	5–0	5–0
2	Wales	3	2	1	7	8	−1	15	21	−6	613	682	−69	2			—	4–1	3–2
3	Slovakia	3	1	2	4	11	−7	13	24	−11	583	715	−132	1				—	3–2
4	Hungary	3	0	3	4	11	−7	12	25	−13	596	728	−132	0					—

Source: BWF

=== Bulgaria vs. Hungary ===
Bulgaria
5
Arena Ursynów, Court 7
16 February 2010, 14:00 UTC+1

Hungary
0

			1	2	3
1	(Bulgaria) (Hungary)	Petya Nedelcheva; Sarolta Varga	21; 6	21; 14
2	(Bulgaria) (Hungary)	Linda Zetchiri; Laura Sárosi	21; 10	21; 3
3	(Bulgaria) (Hungary)	Dimitria Popstoikova; Mónika Szőke	21; 11	21; 15
4	(Bulgaria) (Hungary)	Diana Dimova / Linda Zetchiri; Sára Fekete / Laura Sárosi	21; 13	21; 5
5	(Bulgaria) (Hungary)	Petya Nedelcheva / Dimitria Popstoikova; Zsófia Horváth / Sarolta Varga	21; 14	21; 13

=== Slovakia vs. Wales ===
Slovakia
1
Arena Ursynów, Court 8
16 February 2010, 14:00 UTC+1

Wales
4

			1	2	3
1	(Slovakia) (Wales)	Monika Fašungová; Sarah Thomas	21; 19	17; 21	12; 21
2	(Slovakia) (Wales)	Zuzana Orlovská; Carissa Turner	21; 17	16; 21	22; 24
3	(Slovakia) (Wales)	Ivana Kubíková; Vikki Jones	21; 12	7; 21	8; 21
4	(Slovakia) (Wales)	Barbora Bobrovská / Zuzana Orlovská; Rachel Thomas / Sarah Thomas	21; 17	21; 19
5	(Slovakia) (Wales)	Monika Fašungová / Ivana Kubíková; Caroline Harvey / Carissa Turner	22; 24	18; 21

=== Hungary vs. Wales ===
Hungary
2
Arena Ursynów, Court 5
17 February 2010, 18:00 UTC+1

Wales
3

			1	2	3
1	(Hungary) (Wales)	Sarolta Varga; Sarah Thomas	21; 15	15; 21	17; 21
2	(Hungary) (Wales)	Laura Sárosi; Carissa Turner	21; 18	14; 21	22; 24
3	(Hungary) (Wales)	Zsófia Horváth / Sarolta Varga; Rachel Thomas / Sarah Thomas	21; 18	14; 21	21; 15
4	(Hungary) (Wales)	Mónika Szőke; Vikki Jones	21; 17	21; 18
5	(Hungary) (Wales)	Sára Fekete / Laura Sárosi; Caroline Harvey / Carissa Turner	20; 22	17; 21

=== Bulgaria vs. Slovakia ===
Bulgaria
5
Arena Ursynów, Court 10
17 February 2010, 18:00 UTC+1

Slovakia
0

			1	2	3
1	(Bulgaria) (Slovakia)	Petya Nedelcheva; Monika Fašungová	21; 7	21; 10
2	(Bulgaria) (Slovakia)	Linda Zetchiri; Zuzana Orlovská	21; 12	21; 16
3	(Bulgaria) (Slovakia)	Diana Dimova; Ivana Kubíková	21; 12	21; 10
4	(Bulgaria) (Slovakia)	Petya Nedelcheva / Dimitria Popstoikova; Barbora Bobrovská / Zuzana Orlovská	21; 8	21; 5
5	(Bulgaria) (Slovakia)	Diana Dimova / Linda Zetchiri; Monika Fašungová / Ivana Kubíková	21; 3	21; 7

=== Hungary vs. Slovakia ===
Hungary
2
Arena Ursynów, Court 1
18 February 2010, 14:00 UTC+1

Slovakia
3

			1	2	3
1	(Hungary) (Slovakia)	Sarolta Varga; Monika Fašungová	21; 19	14; 21	21; 19
2	(Hungary) (Slovakia)	Laura Sárosi; Zuzana Orlovská	20; 22	21; 15	21; 13
3	(Hungary) (Slovakia)	Mónika Szőke; Ivana Kubikova	16; 21	21; 15	18; 21
4	(Hungary) (Slovakia)	Zsófia Horváth / Sarolta Varga; Barbora Bobrovská / Zuzana Orlovská	17; 21	8; 21
5	(Hungary) (Slovakia)	Sára Fekete / Laura Sárosi; Monika Fašungová / Ivana Kubikova	21; 16	9; 21	19; 21

=== Bulgaria vs. Wales ===
Bulgaria
5
Arena Ursynów, Court 4
18 February 2010, 14:00 UTC+1

Wales
0

			1	2	3
1	(Bulgaria) (Wales)	Petya Nedelcheva; Sarah Thomas	21; 6	21; 9
2	(Bulgaria) (Wales)	Linda Zetchiri; Carissa Turner	21; 19	21; 9
3	(Bulgaria) (Wales)	Dimitria Popstoikova; Vikki Jones	21; 11	21; 6
4	(Bulgaria) (Wales)	Diana Dimova / Linda Zetchiri; Caroline Harvey / Carissa Turner	21; 14	21; 11
5	(Bulgaria) (Wales)	Petya Nedelcheva / Dimitria Popstoikova; Rachel Thomas / Sarah Thomas	21; 7	21; 11
