= 2010 European Men's Team Badminton Championships group stage =

This article lists the full results for group stage of 2010 European Men's Team Badminton Championships. The group stage was held from 16 to 18 February 2010.

== Group A ==
| Pos | Team | Pld | W | L | MF | MA | MD | GF | GA | GD | PF | PA | PD | Pts | Qualification | Denmark | Finland | Croatia | Iceland | Hungary |
|---|---|---|---|---|---|---|---|---|---|---|---|---|---|---|---|---|---|---|---|---|
| 1 | Denmark | 4 | 4 | 0 | 20 | 0 | +20 | 40 | 1 | +39 | 858 | 502 | +356 | 4 | Knockout stage | — | 5–0 | 5–0 | 5–0 | 5–0 |
| 2 | Finland | 4 | 3 | 1 | 13 | 7 | +6 | 27 | 14 | +13 | 781 | 723 | +58 | 3 | | | — | 4–1 | 4–1 | 5–0 |
| 3 | Croatia | 4 | 2 | 2 | 9 | 11 | −2 | 20 | 24 | −4 | 773 | 811 | −38 | 2 | | | | — | 3–2 | 5–0 |
| 4 | Iceland | 4 | 1 | 3 | 6 | 14 | −8 | 13 | 30 | −17 | 689 | 814 | −125 | 1 | | | | | — | 3–2 |
| 5 | Hungary | 4 | 0 | 4 | 2 | 18 | −16 | 6 | 37 | −31 | 609 | 860 | −251 | 0 | | | | | | — |

Source: BWF

=== Denmark vs. Iceland ===
Denmark
5
Arena Ursynów, Court 4
16 February 2010, 10:00 UTC+1

Iceland
0

| | | | 1 | 2 | 3 |
|---|---|---|---|---|---|
| 1 | (Denmark) (Iceland) | Jan Ø. Jørgensen; Helgi Jóhannesson | 21; 13 | 21; 17 |
| 2 | (Denmark) (Iceland) | Joachim Persson; Magnús Ingi Helgason | 21; 8 | 21; 9 |
| 3 | (Denmark) (Iceland) | Hans-Kristian Vittinghus; Atli Jóhannesson | 21; 9 | 21; 5 |
| 4 | (Denmark) (Iceland) | Simon Mollyhus / Jonas Rasmussen; Magnús Ingi Helgason / Atli Jóhannesson | 21; 14 | 21; 18 |
| 5 | (Denmark) (Iceland) | Kasper Henriksen / Anders Kristiansen; Kári Gunnarsson / Atli Jóhannesson | 21; 10 | 21; 10 |

=== Croatia vs. Hungary ===
Croatia
5
Arena Ursynów, Court 6
16 February 2010, 10:00 UTC+1

Hungary
0

| | | | 1 | 2 | 3 |
|---|---|---|---|---|---|
| 1 | (Croatia) (Hungary) | Luka Zdenjak; Henrik Tóth | 24; 22 | 21; 19 |
| 2 | (Croatia) (Hungary) | Zvonimir Đurkinjak; Kristóf Horváth | 21; 12 | 21; 16 |
| 3 | (Croatia) (Hungary) | Igor Čimbur; András Németh | 21; 18 | 15; 21 | 21; 15 |
| 4 | (Croatia) (Hungary) | Zvonimir Đurkinjak / Zvonimir Hölbling; Balázs Boros / János Megyesi | 21; 13 | 21; 5 |
| 5 | (Croatia) (Hungary) | Igor Čimbur / Luka Zdenjak; Kristóf Horváth / Henrik Tóth | 18; 21 | 21; 18 | 21; 16 |

=== Hungary vs. Finland ===
Hungary
0
Arena Ursynów, Court 7
16 February 2010, 18:00 UTC+1

Finland
5

| | | | 1 | 2 | 3 |
|---|---|---|---|---|---|
| 1 | (Hungary) (Finland) | Henrik Tóth; Ville Lång | 17; 21 | 17; 21 |
| 2 | (Hungary) (Finland) | Kristóf Horváth; Eetu Heino | 7; 21 | 15; 21 |
| 3 | (Hungary) (Finland) | András Németh; Kasper Lehikoinen | 16; 21 | 15; 21 |
| 4 | (Hungary) (Finland) | János Megyesi / András Németh; Eetu Heino / Marko Pyykönen | 13; 21 | 9; 21 |
| 5 | (Hungary) (Finland) | Balázs Boros / Henrik Tóth; Kasper Lehikoinen / Mikko Vikman | 18; 21 | 13; 21 |

=== Iceland vs. Croatia ===
Iceland
2
Arena Ursynów, Court 8
16 February 2010, 18:00 UTC+1

Croatia
3

| | | | 1 | 2 | 3 |
|---|---|---|---|---|---|
| 1 | (Iceland) (Croatia) | Helgi Jóhannesson; Luka Zdenjak | 17; 21 | 11; 21 |
| 2 | (Iceland) (Croatia) | Magnús Ingi Helgason; Zvonimir Hölbling | 21; 15 | 21; 11 |
| 3 | (Iceland) (Croatia) | Kári Gunnarsson; Zvonimir Đurkinjak | 13; 21 | 21; 17 | 21; 16 |
| 4 | (Iceland) (Croatia) | Magnús Ingi Helgason / Helgi Jóhannesson; Zvonimir Đurkinjak / Zvonimir Hölbling | 16; 21 | 15; 21 |
| 5 | (Iceland) (Croatia) | Kári Gunnarsson / Atli Jóhannesson; Igor Čimbur / Luka Zdenjak | 15; 21 | 13; 21 |

=== Denmark vs. Croatia ===
Denmark
5
Arena Ursynów, Court 1
17 February 2010, 14:00 UTC+1

Croatia
0

| | | | 1 | 2 | 3 |
|---|---|---|---|---|---|
| 1 | (Denmark) (Croatia) | Jan Ø. Jørgensen; Luka Zdenjak | 21; 14 | 21; 10 |
| 2 | (Denmark) (Croatia) | Joachim Persson; Zvonimir Hölbling | 21; 4 | 21; 9 |
| 3 | (Denmark) (Croatia) | Hans-Kristian Vittinghus; Zvonimir Đurkinjak | 21; 16 | 21; 17 |
| 4 | (Denmark) (Croatia) | Kasper Henriksen / Anders Kristiansen; Igor Čimbur / Luka Zdenjak | 21; 17 | 21; 13 |
| 5 | (Denmark) (Croatia) | Simon Mollyhus / Jonas Rasmussen; Zvonimir Đurkinjak / Zvonimir Hölbling | 21; 13 | 21; 15 |

=== Iceland vs. Finland ===
Iceland
1
Arena Ursynów, Court 7
17 February 2010, 14:00 UTC+1

Finland
4

| | | | 1 | 2 | 3 |
|---|---|---|---|---|---|
| 1 | (Iceland) (Finland) | Helgi Jóhannesson; Ville Lång | 19; 21 | 16; 21 |
| 2 | (Iceland) (Finland) | Magnús Ingi Helgason; Eetu Heino | 10; 21 | 17; 21 |
| 3 | (Iceland) (Finland) | Kári Gunnarsson; Kasper Lehikoinen | 16; 21 | 18; 21 |
| 4 | (Iceland) (Finland) | Magnús Ingi Helgason / Helgi Jóhannesson; Kasper Lehikoinen / Mikko Vikman | 21; 19 | 21; 23 | 21; 15 |
| 5 | (Iceland) (Finland) | Kári Gunnarsson / Atli Jóhannesson; Eetu Heino / Marko Pyykönen | 19; 21 | 20; 22 |

=== Denmark vs. Hungary ===
Denmark
5
Arena Ursynów, Court 3
18 February 2010, 10:00 UTC+1

Hungary
0

| | | | 1 | 2 | 3 |
|---|---|---|---|---|---|
| 1 | (Denmark) (Hungary) | Jan Ø. Jørgensen; Henrik Tóth | 21; 11 | 21; 16 |
| 2 | (Denmark) (Hungary) | Joachim Persson; Balázs Boros | 21; 5 | 21; 14 |
| 3 | (Denmark) (Hungary) | Hans-Kristian Vittinghus; János Megyesi | 21; 9 | 21; 5 |
| 4 | (Denmark) (Hungary) | Simon Mollyhus / Jonas Rasmussen; Balázs Boros / Henrik Tóth | 21; 11 | 21; 14 |
| 5 | (Denmark) (Hungary) | Kasper Henriksen / Anders Kristiansen; János Megyesi / András Németh | 21; 8 | 21; 8 |

=== Croatia vs. Finland ===
Croatia
1
Arena Ursynów, Court 6
18 February 2010, 10:00 UTC+1

Finland
4

| | | | 1 | 2 | 3 |
|---|---|---|---|---|---|
| 1 | (Croatia) (Finland) | Luka Zdenjak; Ville Lång | 19; 21 | 14; 21 |
| 2 | (Croatia) (Finland) | Zvonimir Hölbling; Eetu Heino | 12; 21 | 24; 26 |
| 3 | (Croatia) (Finland) | Zvonimir Đurkinjak; Kasper Lehikoinen | 12; 21 | 18; 21 |
| 4 | (Croatia) (Finland) | Igor Čimbur / Luka Zdenjak; Eetu Heino / Marko Pyykönen | 14; 21 | 17; 21 |
| 5 | (Croatia) (Finland) | Zvonimir Đurkinjak / Zvonimir Hölbling; Kasper Lehikoinen / Mikko Vikman | 21; 15 | 21; 18 |

=== Iceland vs. Hungary ===
Iceland
3
Arena Ursynów, Court 2
18 February 2010, 18:00 UTC+1

Hungary
2

| | | | 1 | 2 | 3 |
|---|---|---|---|---|---|
| 1 | (Iceland) (Hungary) | Helgi Jóhannesson; Henrik Tóth | 11; 21 | 5; 21 |
| 2 | (Iceland) (Hungary) | Magnús Ingi Helgason; Kristóf Horváth | 17; 21 | 21; 13 | 14; 21 |
| 3 | (Iceland) (Hungary) | Atli Jóhannesson; András Németh | 21; 16 | 21; 12 |
| 4 | (Iceland) (Hungary) | Magnús Ingi Helgason / Kári Gunnarsson; Kristóf Horváth / Henrik Tóth | 21; 13 | 21; 15 |
| 5 | (Iceland) (Hungary) | Atli Jóhannesson / Helgi Jóhannesson; Balázs Boros / János Megyesi | 21; 13 | 21; 6 |

=== Denmark vs. Finland ===
Denmark
5
Arena Ursynów, Court 3
18 February 2010, 18:00 UTC+1

Finland
0

| | | | 1 | 2 | 3 |
|---|---|---|---|---|---|
| 1 | (Denmark) (Finland) | Jan Ø. Jørgensen; Ville Lång | 21; 15 | 24; 22 |
| 2 | (Denmark) (Finland) | Joachim Persson; Eetu Heino | 21; 17 | 21; 13 |
| 3 | (Denmark) (Finland) | Hans-Kristian Vittinghus; Kasper Lehikoinen | 21; 9 | 21; 6 |
| 4 | (Denmark) (Finland) | Kasper Henriksen / Anders Kristiansen; Eetu Heino / Marko Pyykönen | 21; 13 | 21; 16 |
| 5 | (Denmark) (Finland) | Simon Mollyhus / Jonas Rasmussen; Kasper Lehikoinen / Mikko Vikman | 21; 13 | 21; 15 |

== Group B ==
| Pos | Team | Pld | W | L | MF | MA | MD | GF | GA | GD | PF | PA | PD | Pts | Qualification | Poland | England | Spain | Austria | Lithuania |
|---|---|---|---|---|---|---|---|---|---|---|---|---|---|---|---|---|---|---|---|---|
| 1 | Poland (H) | 4 | 4 | 0 | 16 | 4 | +12 | 33 | 10 | +23 | 850 | 628 | +222 | 4 | Knockout stage | — | 3–2 | 4–1 | 4–1 | 5–0 |
| 2 | England | 4 | 3 | 1 | 17 | 3 | +14 | 34 | 11 | +23 | 903 | 659 | +244 | 3 | | | — | 5–0 | 5–0 | 5–0 |
| 3 | Spain | 4 | 2 | 2 | 9 | 11 | −2 | 22 | 22 | 0 | 797 | 817 | −20 | 2 | | | | — | 3–2 | 5–0 |
| 4 | Austria | 4 | 1 | 3 | 8 | 12 | −4 | 18 | 25 | −7 | 703 | 765 | −62 | 1 | | | | | — | 5–0 |
| 5 | Lithuania | 4 | 0 | 4 | 0 | 20 | −20 | 1 | 40 | −39 | 477 | 861 | −384 | 0 | | | | | | — |

Source: BWF
(H) Host

=== England vs. Lithuania ===
England
5
Arena Ursynów, Court 3
16 February 2010, 10:00 UTC+1

Lithuania
0

| | | | 1 | 2 | 3 |
|---|---|---|---|---|---|
| 1 | (England) (Lithuania) | Rajiv Ouseph; Kęstutis Navickas | 21; 19 | 24; 22 |
| 2 | (England) (Lithuania) | Carl Baxter; Klaudijus Kasinskas | 21; 7 | 21; 8 |
| 3 | (England) (Lithuania) | Harry Wright; Edgaras Slušnys | 21; 6 | 21; 7 |
| 4 | (England) (Lithuania) | Chris Adcock / Robert Blair; Povilas Bartusis / Alan Plavin | 21; 12 | 21; 7 |
| 5 | (England) (Lithuania) | Anthony Clark / Chris Langridge; Donatas Narvilas / Edgaras Slušnys | 21; 7 | 21; 5 |

=== Austria vs. Spain ===
Austria
2
Arena Ursynów, Court 9
16 February 2010, 10:00 UTC+1

Spain
3

| | | | 1 | 2 | 3 |
|---|---|---|---|---|---|
| 1 | (Austria) (Spain) | Michael Lahnsteiner; Pablo Abián | 15; 21 | 18; 21 |
| 2 | (Austria) (Spain) | David Obernosterer; Ernesto Velázquez | 18; 21 | 16; 21 |
| 3 | (Austria) (Spain) | Luka Wraber; Carlos Longo | 11; 21 | 18; 21 |
| 4 | (Austria) (Spain) | David Obernosterer / Roman Zirnwald; David Leal / Eliezer Ojeda | 21; 15 | 21; 15 |
| 5 | (Austria) (Spain) | Michael Lahnsteiner / Peter Zauner; Pablo Abián / Carlos Longo | 21; 12 | 22; 20 |

=== Spain vs. Poland ===
Spain
1
Arena Ursynów, Court 4
16 February 2010, 18:00 UTC+1

Poland
4

| | | | 1 | 2 | 3 |
|---|---|---|---|---|---|
| 1 | (Spain) (Poland) | Pablo Abián; Przemysław Wacha | 22; 20 | 21; 19 |
| 2 | (Spain) (Poland) | Ernesto Velázquez; Hubert Pączek | 21; 11 | 16; 21 | 15; 21 |
| 3 | (Spain) (Poland) | Carlos Longo; Rafał Hawel | 19; 21 | 16; 21 |
| 4 | (Spain) (Poland) | David Leal / Eliezer Ojeda; Robert Mateusiak / Łukasz Moren | 15; 21 | 10; 21 |
| 5 | (Spain) (Poland) | Pablo Abián / Carlos Longo; Adam Cwalina / Michał Łogosz | 15; 21 | 10; 21 |

=== Lithuania vs. Austria ===
Lithuania
0
Arena Ursynów, Court 10
16 February 2010, 18:00 UTC+1

Austria
5

| | | | 1 | 2 | 3 |
|---|---|---|---|---|---|
| 1 | (Lithuania) (Austria) | Kęstutis Navickas; Michael Lahnsteiner | 21; 16 | 8; 21 | 18; 21 |
| 2 | (Lithuania) (Austria) | Klaudijus Kasinskas; David Obernosterer | 16; 21 | 10; 21 |
| 3 | (Lithuania) (Austria) | Povilas Bartusis; Luka Wraber | 11; 21 | 6; 21 |
| 4 | (Lithuania) (Austria) | Donatas Narvilas / Edgaras Slušnys; David Obernosterer / Roman Zirnwald | 7; 21 | 2; 21 |
| 5 | (Lithuania) (Austria) | Povilas Bartusis / Alan Plavin; Michael Lahnsteiner / Peter Zauner | 19; 21 | 10; 21 |

=== Lithuania vs. Poland ===
Lithuania
0
Arena Ursynów, Court 8
17 February 2010, 14:00 UTC+1

Poland
5

| | | | 1 | 2 | 3 |
|---|---|---|---|---|---|
| 1 | (Lithuania) (Poland) | Kęstutis Navickas; Przemysław Wacha | 13; 21 | 18; 21 |
| 2 | (Lithuania) (Poland) | Klaudijus Kasinskas; Michał Rogalski | 20; 22 | 8; 21 |
| 3 | (Lithuania) (Poland) | Alan Plavin; Dariusz Zięba | 10; 21 | 8; 21 |
| 4 | (Lithuania) (Poland) | Donatas Narvilas / Edgaras Slušnys; Robert Mateusiak / Łukasz Moren | 3; 21 | 12; 21 |
| 5 | (Lithuania) (Poland) | Povilas Bartusis / Alan Plavin; Adam Cwalina / Michał Łogosz | 6; 21 | 3; 21 |

=== England vs. Austria ===
England
5
Arena Ursynów, Court 10
17 February 2010, 14:00 UTC+1

Austria
0

| | | | 1 | 2 | 3 |
|---|---|---|---|---|---|
| 1 | (England) (Austria) | Rajiv Ouseph; Michael Lahnsteiner | 21; 12 | 21; 13 |
| 2 | (England) (Austria) | Carl Baxter; David Obernosterer | 21; 11 | 21; 17 |
| 3 | (England) (Austria) | Harry Wright; Matthias Bertsch | 21; 11 | 21; 6 |
| 4 | (England) (Austria) | Chris Adcock / Anthony Clark; Peter Zauner / Michael Lahnsteiner | 21; 10 | 21; 13 |
| 5 | (England) (Austria) | Chris Langridge / Robin Middleton; David Obernosterer / Roman Zirnwald | 21; 12 | 20; 22 | 21; 12 |

=== Austria vs. Poland ===
Austria
1
Arena Ursynów, Court 8
18 February 2010, 10:00 UTC+1

Poland
4

| | | | 1 | 2 | 3 |
|---|---|---|---|---|---|
| 1 | (Austria) (Poland) | Michael Lahnsteiner; Przemysław Wacha | 6; 21 | 21; 18 | 10; 21 |
| 2 | (Austria) (Poland) | David Obernosterer; Michał Rogalski | 21; 18 | 21; 15 |
| 3 | (Austria) (Poland) | Luka Wraber; Dariusz Zięba | 15; 21 | 16; 21 |
| 4 | (Austria) (Poland) | Michael Lahnsteiner / Peter Zauner; Adam Cwalina / Michał Łogosz | 12; 21 | 6; 21 |
| 5 | (Austria) (Poland) | David Obernosterer / Roman Zirnwald; Robert Mateusiak / Łukasz Moren | 15; 21 | 14; 21 |

=== England vs. Spain ===
England
5
Arena Ursynów, Court 10
18 February 2010, 10:00 UTC+1

Spain
0

| | | | 1 | 2 | 3 |
|---|---|---|---|---|---|
| 1 | (England) (Spain) | Rajiv Ouseph; Pablo Abián | 21; 14 | 19; 21 | 21; 17 |
| 2 | (England) (Spain) | Carl Baxter; Ernesto Velázquez | 21; 23 | 21; 18 | 21; 17 |
| 3 | (England) (Spain) | Harry Wright; Carlos Longo | 23; 21 | 21; 18 |
| 4 | (England) (Spain) | Anthony Clark / Robin Middleton; David Leal / Eliezer Ojeda | 18; 21 | 21; 11 | 21; 17 |
| 5 | (England) (Spain) | Chris Adcock / Robert Blair; Pablo Abián / Carlos Longo | 21; 9 | 21; 11 |

=== Lithuania vs. Spain ===
Lithuania
0
Arena Ursynów, Court 5
18 February 2010, 18:00 UTC+1

Spain
5

| | | | 1 | 2 | 3 |
|---|---|---|---|---|---|
| 1 | (Lithuania) (Spain) | Kęstutis Navickas; Pablo Abián | 17; 21 | 20; 22 |
| 2 | (Lithuania) (Spain) | Klaudijus Kasinskas; Ernesto Velázquez | 11; 21 | 16; 21 |
| 3 | (Lithuania) (Spain) | Edgaras Slušnys; David Leal | 9; 21 | 18; 21 |
| 4 | (Lithuania) (Spain) | Povilas Bartusis / Alan Plavin; Pablo Abian / Carlos Longo | 13; 21 | 14; 21 |
| 5 | (Lithuania) (Spain) | Donatas Narvilas / Kęstutis Navickas; David Leal / Eliezer Ojeda | 12; 21 | 18; 21 |

=== England vs. Poland ===
England
2
Arena Ursynów, Court 8
18 February 2010, 18:00 UTC+1

Poland
3

| | | | 1 | 2 | 3 |
|---|---|---|---|---|---|---|
| 1 | (England) (Poland) | Rajiv Ouseph; Przemysław Wacha | 21; 15 | 15; 21 | 14; 21 |
| 2 | (England) (Poland) | Chris Adcock / Robert Blair; Adam Cwalina / Michał Łogosz | 21; 15 | 20; 22 | 19; 21 |
| 3 | (England) (Poland) | Carl Baxter; Hubert Pączek | 17; 21 | 14; 21 |
| 4 | (England) (Poland) | Anthony Clark / Chris Langridge; Robert Mateusiak / Przemysław Wacha | 21; 14 | 0; 0 | | retired |
| 5 | (England) (Poland) | Harry Wright; Rafał Hawel | 17; 21 | 11; 10 | | retired |

== Group C ==
| Pos | Team | Pld | W | L | MF | MA | MD | GF | GA | GD | PF | PA | PD | Pts | Qualification | Netherlands | Ireland | Estonia | Greece |
|---|---|---|---|---|---|---|---|---|---|---|---|---|---|---|---|---|---|---|---|
| 1 | Netherlands | 3 | 3 | 0 | 13 | 2 | +11 | 27 | 5 | +22 | 643 | 471 | +172 | 3 | Knockout stage | — | 4–1 | 4–1 | 5–0 |
| 2 | Ireland | 3 | 2 | 1 | 8 | 7 | +1 | 19 | 16 | +3 | 649 | 577 | +72 | 2 | | | — | 3–2 | 4–1 |
| 3 | Estonia | 3 | 1 | 2 | 7 | 8 | −1 | 15 | 17 | −2 | 564 | 575 | −11 | 1 | | | | — | 4–1 |
| 4 | Greece | 3 | 0 | 3 | 2 | 13 | −11 | 4 | 27 | −23 | 403 | 636 | −233 | 0 | | | | | — |

Source: BWF

=== Netherlands vs. Greece ===
Netherlands
5
Arena Ursynów, Court 3
16 February 2010, 14:00 UTC+1

Greece
0

| | | | 1 | 2 | 3 |
|---|---|---|---|---|---|
| 1 | (Netherlands) (Greece) | Rune Massing; Georgios Charalambidis | 21; 7 | 21; 13 |
| 2 | (Netherlands) (Greece) | Jordy Hilbink; Panagiotis Skarlatos | 21; 13 | 21; 14 |
| 3 | (Netherlands) (Greece) | Erik Meijs; George Galvas | 21; 16 | 21; 12 |
| 4 | (Netherlands) (Greece) | Jacco Arends / Dave Khodabux; Georgios Charalambidis / Antonis Chatzifotis | 21; 9 | 21; 13 |
| 5 | (Netherlands) (Greece) | Lester Oey / Koen Ridder; George Galvas / Panagiotis Skarlatos | 21; 8 | 21; 13 |

=== Estonia vs. Ireland ===
Estonia
2
Arena Ursynów, Court 10
16 February 2010, 14:00 UTC+1

Ireland
3

| | | | 1 | 2 | 3 |
|---|---|---|---|---|---|
| 1 | (Estonia) (Republic of Ireland) | Raul Must; Scott Evans | 9; 21 | 19; 21 |
| 2 | (Estonia) (Republic of Ireland) | Rainer Kaljumae; Tony Stephenson | 22; 20 | 13; 21 | 17; 21 |
| 3 | (Estonia) (Republic of Ireland) | Kristjan Täherand; Niall Tierney | 21; 17 | 21; 17 |
| 4 | (Estonia) (Republic of Ireland) | Ants Mängel / Raul Must; Scott Evans / Daniel Magee | 21; 15 | 14; 21 | 21; 14 |
| 5 | (Estonia) (Republic of Ireland) | Kristjan Kaljurand / Kristjan Täherand; Sam Magee / Tony Stephenson | 15; 21 | 11; 21 |

=== Greece vs. Ireland ===
Greece
1
Arena Ursynów, Court 1
17 February 2010, 18:00 UTC+1

Ireland
4

| | | | 1 | 2 | 3 |
|---|---|---|---|---|---|
| 1 | (Greece) (Republic of Ireland) | Georgios Charalambidis; Scott Evans | 12; 21 | 8; 21 |
| 2 | (Greece) (Republic of Ireland) | Panagiotis Skarlatos; Tony Stephenson | 11; 21 | 9; 21 |
| 3 | (Greece) (Republic of Ireland) | George Galvas; Niall Tierney | 8; 21 | 21; 12 | 21; 19 |
| 4 | (Greece) (Republic of Ireland) | George Galvas / Panagiotis Skarlatos; Sam Magee / Tony Stephenson | 15; 21 | 16; 21 |
| 5 | (Greece) (Republic of Ireland) | Georgios Charalambidis / Antonis Chatzifotis; Scott Evans / Niall Tierney | 11; 21 | 8; 21 |

=== Netherlands vs. Estonia ===
Netherlands
4
Arena Ursynów, Court 6
17 February 2010, 18:00 UTC+1

Estonia
1

| | | | 1 | 2 | 3 |
|---|---|---|---|---|---|
| 1 | (Netherlands) (Estonia) | Rune Massing; Raul Must | 19; 21 | 13; 21 |
| 2 | (Netherlands) (Estonia) | Lester Oey; Rainer Kaljumäe | 21; 19 | 21; 12 |
| 3 | (Netherlands) (Estonia) | Saber Afif; Kristjan Täherand | 21; 13 | 21; 16 |
| 4 | (Netherlands) (Estonia) | Jacco Arends / Dave Khodabux; Ants Mängel / Raul Must | 21; 16 | 21; 15 |
| 5 | (Netherlands) (Estonia) | Lester Oey / Koen Ridder; Kristjan Kaljurand / Kristjan Täherand | 21; 13 | 21; 8 |

=== Greece vs. Estonia ===
Greece
1
Arena Ursynów, Court 4
18 February 2010, 14:00 UTC+1

Estonia
4

| | | | 1 | 2 | 3 |
|---|---|---|---|---|---|
| 1 | (Greece) (Estonia) | Georgios Charalambidis; Raul Must | 11; 21 | 13; 21 |
| 2 | (Greece) (Estonia) | George Galvas; Rainer Kaljumäe | 3; 21 | 13; 21 |
| 3 | (Greece) (Estonia) | Antonis Chatzifotis; Kristjan Täherand | 15; 21 | 13; 21 |
| 4 | (Greece) (Estonia) | George Galvas / Panagiotis Skarlatos; Kristjan Kaljurand / Kristjan Täherand | 21; 19 | 21; 17 |
| 5 | (Greece) (Estonia) | Georgios Charalambidis / Antonis Chatzifotis; Ants Mängel / Raul Must | 14; 21 | 21; 23 |

=== Netherlands vs. Ireland ===
Netherlands
4
Arena Ursynów, Court 5
18 February 2010, 14:00 UTC+1

Ireland
1

| | | | 1 | 2 | 3 |
|---|---|---|---|---|---|
| 1 | (Netherlands) (Republic of Ireland) | Rune Massing; Scott Evans | 8; 21 | 21; 19 | 16; 21 |
| 2 | (Netherlands) (Republic of Ireland) | Lester Oey; Tony Stephenson | 21; 11 | 21; 10 |
| 3 | (Netherlands) (Republic of Ireland) | Saber Afif; Niall Tierney | 21; 15 | 21; 11 |
| 4 | (Netherlands) (Republic of Ireland) | Lester Oey / Koen Ridder; Sam Magee / Tony Stephenson | 21; 16 | 21; 15 |
| 5 | (Netherlands) (Republic of Ireland) | Jacco Arends / Dave Khodabux; Scott Evans / Niall Tierney | 23; 21 | 18; 21 | 21; 18 |

== Group D ==
| Pos | Team | Pld | W | L | MF | MA | MD | GF | GA | GD | PF | PA | PD | Pts | Qualification | Germany | Czech Republic | Scotland | Bulgaria |
|---|---|---|---|---|---|---|---|---|---|---|---|---|---|---|---|---|---|---|---|
| 1 | Germany | 3 | 3 | 0 | 15 | 0 | +15 | 30 | 2 | +28 | 660 | 436 | +224 | 3 | Knockout stage | — | 5–0 | 5–0 | 5–0 |
| 2 | Czech Republic | 3 | 1 | 2 | 6 | 9 | −3 | 13 | 19 | −6 | 550 | 603 | −53 | 1 | | | — | 4–1 | 2–3 |
| 3 | Scotland | 3 | 1 | 2 | 5 | 10 | −5 | 12 | 21 | −9 | 559 | 619 | −60 | 1 | | | | — | 4–1 |
| 4 | Bulgaria | 3 | 1 | 2 | 4 | 11 | −7 | 10 | 23 | −13 | 532 | 643 | −111 | 1 | | | | | — |

Source: BWF

=== Germany vs. Bulgaria ===
Germany
5
Arena Ursynów, Court 2
16 February 2010, 18:00 UTC+1

Bulgaria
0

| | | | 1 | 2 | 3 |
|---|---|---|---|---|---|
| 1 | (Germany) (Bulgaria) | Marc Zwiebler; Stiliyan Makarski | 21; 13 | 21; 15 |
| 2 | (Germany) (Bulgaria) | Dieter Domke; Krasimir Jankov | 21; 17 | 21; 14 |
| 3 | (Germany) (Bulgaria) | Marcel Reuter; Peyo Boychinov | 21; 6 | 21; 13 |
| 4 | (Germany) (Bulgaria) | Kristof Hopp / Johannes Schöttler; Krasimir Jankov / Julian Hristov | 21; 7 | 21; 13 |
| 5 | (Germany) (Bulgaria) | Peter Käsbauer / Oliver Roth; Peyo Boychinov / Stiliyan Makarski | 14; 21 | 21; 15 | 21; 17 |

=== Scotland vs. Czech Republic ===
Scotland
1
Arena Ursynów, Court 9
16 February 2010, 18:00 UTC+1

Czech Republic
4

| | | | 1 | 2 | 3 |
|---|---|---|---|---|---|
| 1 | (Scotland) (Czech Republic) | Kieran Merrilees; Petr Koukal | 14; 21 | 9; 21 |
| 2 | (Scotland) (Czech Republic) | Martin Campbell; Jan Vondra | 16; 21 | 16; 21 |
| 3 | (Scotland) (Czech Republic) | Calum Menzies; Tomáš Kopřiva | 20; 22 | 21; 17 | 17; 21 |
| 4 | (Scotland) (Czech Republic) | Martin Campbell / Paul van Rietvelde; Jakub Bitman / Pavel Drančák | 18; 21 | 14; 21 |
| 5 | (Scotland) (Czech Republic) | Andrew Bowman / Watson Briggs; Ondřej Kopřiva / Tomáš Kopřiva | 21; 18 | 21; 14 |

=== Germany vs. Scotland ===
Germany
5
Arena Ursynów, Court 5
17 February 2010, 14:00 UTC+1

Scotland
0

| | | | 1 | 2 | 3 |
|---|---|---|---|---|---|
| 1 | (Germany) (Scotland) | Marc Zwiebler; Kieran Merrilees | 21; 12 | 21; 13 |
| 2 | (Germany) (Scotland) | Dieter Domke; Martin Campbell | 21; 14 | 21; 6 |
| 3 | (Germany) (Scotland) | Michael Fuchs / Ingo Kindervater; Andrew Bowman / Watson Briggs | 21; 13 | 21; 17 |
| 4 | (Germany) (Scotland) | Fabian Hammes; Calum Menzies | 21; 16 | 21; 13 |
| 5 | (Germany) (Scotland) | Kristof Hopp / Johannes Schöttler; Martin Campbell / Paul van Rietvelde | 21; 11 | 21; 16 |

=== Bulgaria vs. Czech Republic ===
Bulgaria
3
Arena Ursynów, Court 9
17 February 2010, 14:00 UTC+1

Czech Republic
2

| | | | 1 | 2 | 3 |
|---|---|---|---|---|---|
| 1 | (Bulgaria) (Czech Republic) | Stiliyan Makarski; Petr Koukal | 14; 21 | 16; 21 |
| 2 | (Bulgaria) (Czech Republic) | Krasimir Jankov; Jan Vondra | 21; 11 | 21; 16 |
| 3 | (Bulgaria) (Czech Republic) | Peyo Boychinov; Tomáš Kopřiva | 17; 21 | 17; 21 |
| 4 | (Bulgaria) (Czech Republic) | Julian Hristov / Krasimir Jankov; Ondřej Kopřiva / Tomáš Kopřiva | 21; 16 | 21; 19 |
| 5 | (Bulgaria) (Czech Republic) | Peyo Boychinov / Stiliyan Makarski; Jakub Bitman / Pavel Drančák | 21; 14 | 21; 18 |

=== Bulgaria vs. Scotland ===
Bulgaria
1
Arena Ursynów, Court 9
18 February 2010, 10:00 UTC+1

Scotland
4

| | | | 1 | 2 | 3 |
|---|---|---|---|---|---|
| 1 | (Bulgaria) (Scotland) | Stiliyan Makarski; Kieran Merrilees | 17; 21 | 17; 21 |
| 2 | (Bulgaria) (Scotland) | Krasimir Jankov; Martin Campbell | 15; 21 | 21; 15 | 21; 19 |
| 3 | (Bulgaria) (Scotland) | Peyo Boychinov; Calum Menzies | 11; 21 | 12; 21 |
| 4 | (Bulgaria) (Scotland) | Julian Hristov / Krasimir Jankov; Andrew Bowman / Watson Briggs | 21; 18 | 15; 21 | 11; 21 |
| 5 | (Bulgaria) (Scotland) | Peyo Boychinov / Stiliyan Makarski; Martin Campbell / Paul van Rietvelde | 16; 21 | 14; 21 |

=== Germany vs. Czech Republic ===
Germany
5
Arena Ursynów, Court 10
18 February 2010, 18:00 UTC+1

Czech Republic
0

| | | | 1 | 2 | 3 |
|---|---|---|---|---|---|
| 1 | (Germany) (Czech Republic) | Marc Zwiebler; Petr Koukal | 21; 16 | 21; 18 |
| 2 | (Germany) (Czech Republic) | Dieter Domke; Jan Vondra | 21; 11 | 21; 11 |
| 3 | (Germany) (Czech Republic) | Marcel Reuter; Jakub Bitman | 21; 17 | 21; 8 |
| 4 | (Germany) (Czech Republic) | Michael Fuchs / Ingo Kindervater; Ondřej Kopřiva / Tomáš Kopřiva | 21; 16 | 21; 13 |
| 5 | (Germany) (Czech Republic) | Kristof Hopp / Johannes Schöttler; Jakub Bitman / Pavel Drančák | 21; 18 | 16; 21 | 21; 5 |

== Group E ==
| Pos | Team | Pld | W | L | MF | MA | MD | GF | GA | GD | PF | PA | PD | Pts | Qualification | Russia | Sweden | Slovakia | Italy |
|---|---|---|---|---|---|---|---|---|---|---|---|---|---|---|---|---|---|---|---|
| 1 | Russia | 3 | 3 | 0 | 13 | 2 | +11 | 28 | 6 | +22 | 687 | 472 | +215 | 3 | Knockout stage | — | 4–1 | 5–0 | 4–1 |
| 2 | Sweden | 3 | 2 | 1 | 11 | 4 | +7 | 24 | 8 | +16 | 631 | 462 | +169 | 2 | | | — | 5–0 | 5–0 |
| 3 | Slovakia | 3 | 1 | 2 | 4 | 11 | −7 | 10 | 22 | −12 | 451 | 608 | −157 | 1 | | | | — | 4–1 |
| 4 | Italy | 3 | 0 | 3 | 2 | 13 | −11 | 2 | 28 | −26 | 374 | 601 | −227 | 0 | | | | | — |

Source: BWF

=== Russia vs. Italy ===
Russia
4
Arena Ursynów, Court 3
16 February 2010, 18:00 UTC+1

Italy
1

| | | | 1 | 2 | 3 |
|---|---|---|---|---|---|---|
| 1 | (Russia) (Italy) | Vladimir Malkov; Giovanni Greco | 21; 5 | 21; 17 |
| 2 | (Russia) (Italy) | Vladimir Ivanov; Marco Mondavio | 21; 6 | 21; 9 |
| 3 | (Russia) (Italy) | Ivan Sozonov; Pierluigi Musiari | 21; 17 | 11; 2 | | retired |
| 4 | (Russia) (Italy) | Evgeniy Dremin / Stanislav Pukhov; Marco Mondavio / Giovanni Traina | 21; 11 | 21; 8 |
| 5 | (Russia) (Italy) | Vitalij Durkin / Alexandr Nikolaenko; Giovanni Greco / Pierluigi Musiari | 21; 12 | 21; 13 |

=== Slovakia vs. Sweden ===
Slovakia
0
Arena Ursynów, Court 5
16 February 2010, 18:00 UTC+1

Sweden
5

| | | | 1 | 2 | 3 |
|---|---|---|---|---|---|
| 1 | (Slovakia) (Sweden) | Michal Matejka; Henri Hurskainen | 8; 21 | 14; 21 |
| 2 | (Slovakia) (Sweden) | Jarolím Vícen; Mattias Wigardt | 14; 21 | 8; 21 |
| 3 | (Slovakia) (Sweden) | Marián Šulko; Mattias Borg | 7; 21 | 11; 21 |
| 4 | (Slovakia) (Sweden) | Marián Smrek / Vladimír Závada; Peder Nordin / Magnus Sahlberg | 8; 21 | 11; 21 |
| 5 | (Slovakia) (Sweden) | Marián Šulko / Jarolím Vícen; Richard Eidestedt / Tim Foo | 9; 21 | 9; 21 |

=== Russia vs. Slovakia ===
Russia
5
Arena Ursynów, Court 3
17 February 2010, 14:00 UTC+1

Slovakia
0

| | | | 1 | 2 | 3 |
|---|---|---|---|---|---|
| 1 | (Russia) (Slovakia) | Vladimir Malkov; Michal Matejka | 21; 16 | 21; 8 |
| 2 | (Russia) (Slovakia) | Vladimir Ivanov; Jarolím Vícen | 21; 19 | 21; 17 |
| 3 | (Russia) (Slovakia) | Stanislav Pukhov; Vladimír Závada | 21; 10 | 21; 12 |
| 4 | (Russia) (Slovakia) | Vitalij Durkin / Alexandr Nikolaenko; Marián Šulko / Jarolím Vícen | 18; 21 | 21; 4 | 21; 10 |
| 5 | (Russia) (Slovakia) | Evgeniy Dremin / Stanislav Pukhov; Marián Smrek / Vladimír Závada | 21; 11 | 18; 21 | 21; 12 |

=== Italy vs. Sweden ===
Italy
0
Arena Ursynów, Court 4
17 February 2010, 14:00 UTC+1

Sweden
5

| | | | 1 | 2 | 3 |
|---|---|---|---|---|---|
| 1 | (Italy) (Sweden) | Giovanni Greco; Henri Hurskainen | 7; 21 | 16; 21 |
| 2 | (Italy) (Sweden) | Marco Mondavio; Magnus Sahlberg | 18; 21 | 9; 21 |
| 3 | (Italy) (Sweden) | Pierluigi Musiari; Mattias Borg | 11; 21 | 11; 21 |
| 4 | (Italy) (Sweden) | Marco Mondavio / Giovanni Traina; Peder Nordin / Mattias Wigardt | 11; 21 | 15; 21 |
| 5 | (Italy) (Sweden) | Giovanni Greco / Pierluigi Musiari; Richard Eidestedt / Tim Foo | 12; 21 | 12; 21 |

=== Italy vs. Slovakia ===
Italy
1
Arena Ursynów, Court 5
18 February 2010, 10:00 UTC+1

Slovakia
4

| | | | 1 | 2 | 3 |
|---|---|---|---|---|---|
| 1 | (Italy) (Slovakia) | Giovanni Greco; Michal Matejka | 13; 21 | 19; 21 |
| 2 | (Italy) (Slovakia) | Giovanni Traina; Jarolím Vícen | 15; 21 | 11; 21 |
| 3 | (Italy) (Slovakia) | Marco Mondavio; Marián Šulko | 21; 10 | 21; 13 |
| 4 | (Italy) (Slovakia) | Giovanni Greco / Pierluigi Musiari; Marián Šulko / Jarolím Vícen | 9; 21 | 16; 21 |
| 5 | (Italy) (Slovakia) | Marco Mondavio / Giovanni Traina; Marián Smrek / Vladimír Závada | 10; 21 | 17; 21 |

=== Russia vs. Sweden ===
Russia
4
Arena Ursynów, Court 9
18 February 2010, 18:00 UTC+1

Sweden
1

| | | | 1 | 2 | 3 |
|---|---|---|---|---|---|
| 1 | (Russia) (Sweden) | Vladimir Malkov; Henri Hurskainen | 17; 21 | 17; 21 |
| 2 | (Russia) (Sweden) | Vladimir Ivanov; Magnus Sahlberg | 21; 16 | 21; 18 |
| 3 | (Russia) (Sweden) | Stanislav Pukhov; Mattias Wigardt | 20; 22 | 21; 12 | 21; 19 |
| 4 | (Russia) (Sweden) | Vitalij Durkin / Alexandr Nikolaenko; Richard Eidestedt / Tim Foo | 21; 15 | 21; 13 |
| 5 | (Russia) (Sweden) | Evgeniy Dremin / Stanislav Pukhov; Peder Nordin / Magnus Sahlberg | 19; 21 | 21; 17 | 21; 16 |

== Group F ==
| Pos | Team | Pld | W | L | MF | MA | MD | GF | GA | GD | PF | PA | PD | Pts | Qualification | Ukraine | France | Wales | Portugal |
|---|---|---|---|---|---|---|---|---|---|---|---|---|---|---|---|---|---|---|---|
| 1 | Ukraine | 3 | 3 | 0 | 11 | 4 | +7 | 25 | 8 | +17 | 654 | 531 | +123 | 3 | Knockout stage | — | 4–1 | 3–2 | 4–1 |
| 2 | France | 3 | 2 | 1 | 9 | 6 | +3 | 18 | 13 | +5 | 599 | 508 | +91 | 2 | | | — | 3–2 | 5–0 |
| 3 | Wales | 3 | 1 | 2 | 9 | 6 | +3 | 18 | 15 | +3 | 573 | 591 | −18 | 1 | | | | — | 5–0 |
| 4 | Portugal | 3 | 0 | 3 | 1 | 14 | −13 | 4 | 29 | −25 | 488 | 684 | −196 | 0 | | | | | — |

Source: BWF

=== France vs. Portugal ===
France
5
Arena Ursynów, Court 7
16 February 2010, 10:00 UTC+1

Portugal
0

| | | | 1 | 2 | 3 |
|---|---|---|---|---|---|
| 1 | (France) (Portugal) | Brice Leverdez; Nuno Santos | 21; 16 | 21; 15 |
| 2 | (France) (Portugal) | Matthieu Lo Ying Ping; Gil Martins | 21; 13 | 21; 11 |
| 3 | (France) (Portugal) | Simon Maunoury; Tomás Nero | 21; 13 | 21; 13 |
| 4 | (France) (Portugal) | Baptiste Carême / Sylvain Grosjean; Hugo Rodrigues / Fernando Silva | 21; 13 | 21; 17 |
| 5 | (France) (Portugal) | Laurent Constantin / Sébastien Vincent; Gil Martins / Tomás Nero | 21; 14 | 21; 15 |

=== Wales vs. Ukraine ===
Wales
2
Arena Ursynów, Court 8
16 February 2010, 10:00 UTC+1

Ukraine
3

| | | | 1 | 2 | 3 |
|---|---|---|---|---|---|
| 1 | (Wales) (Ukraine) | Raj Popat; Dmytro Zavadsky | 17; 21 | 7; 21 |
| 2 | (Wales) (Ukraine) | Irwansyah; Valeriy Atrashchenkov | 21; 9 | 12; 21 | 21; 16 |
| 3 | (Wales) (Ukraine) | Joe Morgan / James Phillips; Vitaliy Konov / Dmytro Zavadsky | 22; 20 | 21; 15 |
| 4 | (Wales) (Ukraine) | Jamie van Hooijdonk; Eugeny Pochtarev | 15; 21 | 17; 21 |
| 5 | (Wales) (Ukraine) | Irwansyah / Martyn Lewis; Valeriy Atrashchenkov / Vladislav Druzhchenko | 13; 21 | 11; 21 |

=== France vs. Wales ===
France
3
Arena Ursynów, Court 8
17 February 2010, 10:00 UTC+1

Wales
2

| | | | 1 | 2 | 3 |
|---|---|---|---|---|---|
| 1 | (France) (Wales) | Brice Leverdez; Raj Popat | 21; 9 | 21; 7 |
| 2 | (France) (Wales) | Matthieu Lo Ying Ping; Irwansyah | 21; 9 | 21; 16 |
| 3 | (France) (Wales) | Baptiste Carême / Sylvain Grosjean; Joe Morgan / James Phillips | 19; 21 | 17; 21 |
| 4 | (France) (Wales) | Simon Maunoury; Jamie van Hooijdonk | 21; 12 | 21; 12 |
| 5 | (France) (Wales) | Laurent Constantin / Sébastien Vincent; Irwansyah / Martyn Lewis | 18; 21 | 15; 21 |

=== Portugal vs. Ukraine ===
Portugal
1
Arena Ursynów, Court 10
17 February 2010, 10:00 UTC+1

Ukraine
4

| | | | 1 | 2 | 3 |
|---|---|---|---|---|---|
| 1 | (Portugal) (Ukraine) | Nuno Santos; Dmytro Zavadsky | 6; 21 | 14; 21 |
| 2 | (Portugal) (Ukraine) | Gil Martins; Valeriy Atrashchenkov | 14; 21 | 17; 21 |
| 3 | (Portugal) (Ukraine) | Tomás Nero; Vitaliy Konov | 11; 21 | 8; 21 |
| 4 | (Portugal) (Ukraine) | Hugo Rodrigues / Fernando Silva; Valeriy Atrashchenkov / Georgiy Natarov | 21; 23 | 21; 18 | 21; 18 |
| 5 | (Portugal) (Ukraine) | Gil Martins / Tomás Nero; Vladislav Druzhchenko / Eugeny Pochtarev | 12; 21 | 15; 21 |

=== Portugal vs. Wales ===
Portugal
0
Arena Ursynów, Court 4
18 February 2010, 10:00 UTC+1

Wales
5

| | | | 1 | 2 | 3 |
|---|---|---|---|---|---|
| 1 | (Portugal) (Wales) | Nuno Santos; Raj Popat | 19; 21 | 19; 21 |
| 2 | (Portugal) (Wales) | Gil Martins; Irwansyah | 13; 21 | 16; 21 |
| 3 | (Portugal) (Wales) | Fernando Silva; Jamie van Hooijdonk | 15; 21 | 21; 14 | 17; 21 |
| 4 | (Portugal) (Wales) | Hugo Rodrigues / Tomás Nero; Irwansyah / Martyn Lewis | 25; 23 | 6; 21 | 15; 21 |
| 5 | (Portugal) (Wales) | Fernando Silva / Gil Martins; Joe Morgan / James Phillips | 9; 21 | 14; 21 |

=== France vs. Ukraine ===
France
1
Arena Ursynów, Court 2
18 February 2010, 14:00 UTC+1

Ukraine
4

| | | | 1 | 2 | 3 |
|---|---|---|---|---|---|
| 1 | (France) (Ukraine) | Brice Leverdez; Dmytro Zavadsky | 15; 21 | 21; 12 | 21; 17 |
| 2 | (France) (Ukraine) | Matthieu Lo Ying Ping; Valeriy Atrashchenkov | 20; 22 | 13; 21 |
| 3 | (France) (Ukraine) | Simon Maunoury; Vladislav Druzhchenko | 15; 21 | 20; 22 |
| 4 | (France) (Ukraine) | Baptiste Carême / Sylvain Grosjean; Vitaliy Konov / Dmytro Zavadsky | 19; 21 | 19; 21 |
| 5 | (France) (Ukraine) | Ronan Labar / Florian Gauthier; Valeriy Atrashchenkov / Vladislav Druzhchenko | 18; 21 | 13; 21 |
