= Badminton at the 2016 Summer Olympics – Qualification =

This article details the qualifying phase for badminton at the 2016 Summer Olympics. The Olympic qualification period took place between May 4, 2015, and May 1, 2016, and the Badminton World Federation rankings list, scheduled to publish on May 5, 2016, will be used to allocate spots. Unlike the previous Games, nations could only enter a maximum of two players each in the men's and women's singles, if both are ranked in the world's top 16; otherwise, one quota place until the roster of thirty-eight players has been completed. Similar regulations in the singles tournaments also apply to the players competing in the doubles, as the NOCs could only enter a maximum of two pairs if both are ranked in the top eight, while the remaining NOCs are entitled to one until the quota of 16 highest-ranked pairs is filled.

== Qualifying standards ==
Qualification of these Games will be based on the BWF Ranking list to be published on May 5, 2016, providing a total of 16 pairs in each doubles event, and 38 players in each singles event in the following criteria:

- Singles:
  - Ranking 1-16: Players are taken in turn. A NOC may enter up to a maximum of 2 players, provided both are ranked in the top 16.
  - Ranking 17 and below: Players are taken in turn. A NOC may enter a maximum of 1 player.
- Doubles:
  - Rankings 1–8: Pairs are taken in turn. A NOC may enter up to a maximum of 2 pairs, provided both pairs are ranked in the top 8.
  - Rankings 9 and above: Pairs are taken in turn. A NOC may enter a maximum of 1 pair.

Each of the five continental confederations will be guaranteed at least one entry in each singles and doubles event (this is called the Continental Representation Place system). If this has not been satisfied by the entry selection method described above, the highest ranked player or pair from the respective continent will qualify. A NOC can qualify players or pairs in a maximum of two events through the Continental Representation Place system; if a NOC qualifies for more than two events through the Continental Representation Place system, the NOC must choose which of them are qualified, and the quota place declined will be offered to the next NOC's eligible player or pair. For each player who qualifies in more than one discipline, an unused quota place will be allocated to the next best ranked eligible athlete of a respective gender in the singles events on the BWF Ranking List as of May 5, 2016.

Host nation Brazil has been entitled to enter a male and a female badminton player in each of the singles tournaments, but more than two players may be permitted if they have achieved the qualifying regulations. Meanwhile, six quota places are made available to eligible NOCs through the Tripartite Commission Invitation, with three each in the men's and women's singles.

== Summary ==
NOC	Men		Women		Mixed	Total	
NOC	Singles	Doubles	Singles	Doubles	Doubles	Quotas	Athletes
Australia		1	1		1	3	5
Austria	1		1			2	2
Belgium	1		1			2	2
Brazil	1		1			2	2
Brunei	1					1	1
Bulgaria			1	1		2	3
Canada	1		1			2	2
China	2	2	2	2	2	10	15
Cuba	1					1	1
Czech Republic	1		1			2	2
Denmark	2	1	1	1	1	6	8
Estonia	1		1			2	2
Finland			1			1	1
France	1		1			2	2
Germany	1	1	1	1	1	5	7
Great Britain	1	1	1	1	1	5	8
Guatemala	1					1	1
Hong Kong	2		1	1	1	5	7
Hungary			1			1	1
India	1	1	2	1		5	7
Indonesia	1	1	1	1	2	6	10
Ireland	1		1			2	2
Israel	1					1	1
Italy			1			1	1
Japan	1	1	2	1	1	6	9
Malaysia	1	1	1	1	1	5	8
Mauritius			1			1	1
Mexico	1					1	1
Netherlands				1	1	2	3
Poland	1	1			1	3	5
Portugal	1		1			2	2
Russia	1	1	1			3	4
Singapore	1		1			2	2
South Africa	1					1	1
South Korea	2	2	2	2	1	9	14
Spain	1		1			2	2
Sri Lanka	1					1	1
Suriname	1					1	1
Sweden	1					1	1
Switzerland			1			1	1
Chinese Taipei	1	1	1			3	4
Thailand	1		2	1	1	5	7
Turkey			1			1	1
Ukraine	1		1			2	2
United States	1	1	1	1	1	5	7
Vietnam	1		1			2	2
Total: 46 NOCs	41	16	40	16	16	129	172

== Qualified players ==
The color pink signifies that a player has been withdrawn from the competition.

BWF Olympic Qualification (May 5, 2016)

=== Men's singles ===
No.	Rank	Player	NOC	Remark
1	1	Chen Long	China	
2	2	Lee Chong Wei	Malaysia	
3	3	Lin Dan	China	
4	4	Viktor Axelsen	Denmark	
5	5	Jan Ø. Jørgensen	Denmark	
6	7	Chou Tien-chen	Chinese Taipei	
7	8	Tommy Sugiarto	Indonesia	
8	9	Son Wan-ho	South Korea	
9	10	Ng Ka Long	Hong Kong	
10	11	Srikanth Kidambi	India	
11	12	Marc Zwiebler	Germany	
12	14	Hu Yun	Hong Kong	
13	15	Rajiv Ouseph	Great Britain	
14	16	Lee Dong-keun	South Korea	
15	20	Boonsak Ponsana	Thailand	
16	27	Sho Sasaki	Japan	
17	32	Nguyễn Tiến Minh	Vietnam	
18	35	Pablo Abián	Spain	
19	40	Brice Leverdez	France	
20	42	Raul Must	Estonia	
21	48	Kevin Cordón	Guatemala	
22	49	Henri Hurskainen	Sweden	
23	51	Yuhan Tan	Belgium	
24	52	Vladimir Malkov	Russia	
25	56	Adrian Dziółko	Poland	
26	58	Misha Zilberman	Israel	
27	59	Osleni Guerrero	Cuba	
28	60	Ygor Coelho	Brazil	
29	61	Scott Evans	Ireland	
30	62	Artem Pochtarov	Ukraine	
31	63	Derek Wong	Singapore	
32	64	Howard Shu	United States	
33	65	Pedro Martins	Portugal	Re-distributed host quota
34	68	David Obernosterer	Austria	Re-distributed doubles quota
35	70	Martin Giuffre	Canada	Re-distributed doubles quota
36	72	Petr Koukal	Czech Republic	Re-distributed doubles quota
37	73	Lino Muñoz	Mexico	Re-distributed continental quota
38	78	Jacob Maliekal	South Africa	Africa
39	95	Niluka Karunaratne	Sri Lanka	Tripartite invitation
—	133	Ashwant Gobinathan	Australia	Oceania
—	254	Dylan Soedjasa	New Zealand	Oceania
40	280	Sören Opti	Suriname	Tripartite invitation
41	406	Jaspar Yu Woon	Brunei	Tripartite invitation

=== Women's singles ===
No.	Rank	Player	NOC	Remark
1	1	Carolina Marín	Spain	
2	2	Ratchanok Intanon	Thailand	
3	3	Li Xuerui	China	
4	4	Wang Yihan	China	
5	5	Nozomi Okuhara	Japan	
6	8	Sung Ji-hyun	South Korea	
7	6	Saina Nehwal	India	
8	9	Tai Tzu-ying	Chinese Taipei	
9	10	P. V. Sindhu	India	
10	11	Akane Yamaguchi	Japan	
11	14	Bae Yeon-ju	South Korea	
12	16	Porntip Buranaprasertsuk	Thailand	
13	17	Kirsty Gilmour	Great Britain	
14	18	Michelle Li	Canada	
15	22	Lindaweni Fanetri	Indonesia	
16	26	Karin Schnaase	Germany	
17	27	Line Kjærsfeldt	Denmark	
18	29	Tee Jing Yi	Malaysia	
19	30	Yip Pui Yin	Hong Kong	
20	33	Iris Wang	United States	
21	35	Liang Xiaoyu	Singapore	
22	36	Kristína Gavnholt	Czech Republic	
23	40	Linda Zetchiri	Bulgaria	
24	46	Özge Bayrak	Turkey	
25	47	Vũ Thị Trang	Vietnam	
26	49	Natalia Perminova	Russia	
27	53	Delphine Lansac	France	
28	56	Jeanine Cicognini	Italy	
29	57	Marija Ulitina	Ukraine	
30	59	Elisabeth Baldauf	Austria	
31	60	Nanna Vainio	Finland	
32	61	Lianne Tan	Belgium	
33	63	Sabrina Jaquet	Switzerland	Re-distributed doubles quota
34	64	Chloe Magee	Ireland	Re-distributed doubles quota
35	65	Telma Santos	Portugal	Re-distributed Tripartite invitation
36	66	Kate Foo Kune	Mauritius	Africa
37	67	Kati Tolmoff	Estonia	Re-distributed Tripartite invitation
38	70	Lohaynny Vicente	Brazil	Host nation quota
39	71	Laura Sárosi	Hungary	Re-distributed Tripartite invitation
40	73	Chen Hsuan-yu	Australia	Oceania

=== Men's doubles ===
No.	Rank	Players		NOC	Remark
1	1	Lee Yong-dae	Yoo Yeon-seong	South Korea	
2	2	Hendra Setiawan	Mohammad Ahsan	Indonesia	
3	3	Fu Haifeng	Zhang Nan	China	
4	4	Kim Gi-jung	Kim Sa-rang	South Korea	
5	5	Chai Biao	Hong Wei	China	
6	7	Hiroyuki Endo	Kenichi Hayakawa	Japan	
7	8	Mathias Boe	Carsten Mogensen	Denmark	
8	10	Vladimir Ivanov	Ivan Sozonov	Russia	
9	14	Goh V Shem	Tan Wee Kiong	Malaysia	
10	18	Lee Sheng-mu	Tsai Chia-hsin	Chinese Taipei	
11	19	Marcus Ellis	Chris Langridge	Great Britain	
12	20	Manu Attri	B. Sumeeth Reddy	India	
13	27	Adam Cwalina	Przemysław Wacha	Poland	
14	28	Michael Fuchs	Johannes Schöttler	Germany	
15	35	Sattawat Pongnairat	Phillip Chew	United States	Pan America
16	46	Matthew Chau	Sawan Serasinghe	Australia	Oceania

=== Women's doubles ===
No.	Rank	Players		NOC	Remark
1	1	Misaki Matsutomo	Ayaka Takahashi	Japan	
2	2	Nitya Krishinda Maheswari	Greysia Polii	Indonesia	
3	3	Tang Yuanting	Yu Yang	China	
—	4	Tian Qing	Zhao Yunlei	China	
4	5	Christinna Pedersen	Kamilla Rytter Juhl	Denmark	
5	6	Jung Kyung-eun	Shin Seung-chan	South Korea	
6	7	Luo Ying	Luo Yu	China	
7	8	Chang Ye-na	Lee So-hee	South Korea	
8	11	Eefje Muskens	Selena Piek	Netherlands	
9	14	Jwala Gutta	Ashwini Ponnappa	India	
10	15	Gabriela Stoeva	Stefani Stoeva	Bulgaria	
11	17	Puttita Supajirakul	Sapsiree Taerattanachai	Thailand	
12	21	Vivian Hoo	Woon Khe Wei	Malaysia	
13	22	Poon Lok Yan	Tse Ying Suet	Hong Kong	
14	23	Carla Nelte	Johanna Goliszewski	Germany	
15	26	Heather Olver	Lauren Smith	Great Britain	
16	29	Eva Lee	Paula Lynn Obañana	United States	Pan America

=== Mixed doubles ===
No.	Rank	Players		NOC	Remark
1	1	Zhang Nan	Zhao Yunlei	China	
2	2	Tontowi Ahmad	Liliyana Natsir	Indonesia	
3	3	Ko Sung-hyun	Kim Ha-na	South Korea	
4	4	Xu Chen	Ma Jin	China	
5	5	Joachim Fischer Nielsen	Christinna Pedersen	Denmark	
6	7	Chris Adcock	Gabby Adcock	Great Britain	
7	8	Praveen Jordan	Debby Susanto	Indonesia	
8	10	Chan Peng Soon	Goh Liu Ying	Malaysia	
9	12	Lee Chun Hei	Chau Hoi Wah	Hong Kong	
10	14	Bodin Isara	Savitree Amitrapai	Thailand	
11	15	Jacco Arends	Selena Piek	Netherlands	
12	16	Michael Fuchs	Birgit Michels	Germany	
13	17	Robert Mateusiak	Nadieżda Zięba	Poland	
14	18	Kenta Kazuno	Ayane Kurihara	Japan	
15	27	Phillip Chew	Jamie Subandhi	United States	Pan America
16	34	Robin Middleton	Leanne Choo	Australia	Oceania
