= 2010 European Women's Team Badminton Championships knockout stage =

This article lists the full results for knockout stage of 2010 European Women's Team Badminton Championships.

== Bracket ==
Quarter-finals
19 February 2010
Denmark
BYE
Germany	3
Bulgaria	0
Scotland	0
Russia	3
BYE
Netherlands

Semi-finals
20 February 2010
Denmark	3
Germany	1
Russia	3
Netherlands	0

Final
21 February 2010
Denmark	3
Russia	2
Third place
21 February 2010
Germany	3
Netherlands	0

== Quarter-finals ==
=== Germany vs. Bulgaria ===
Germany
3
Arena Ursynów, Court 1
19 February 2010, 14:00 UTC+1

Bulgaria
0

			1	2	3
1	(Germany) (Bulgaria)	Juliane Schenk; Petya Nedelcheva	22; 20	21; 13
2	(Germany) (Bulgaria)	Karin Schnaase; Linda Zetchiri	21; 19	21; 12
3	(Germany) (Bulgaria)	Fabienne Deprez; Dimitria Popstoikova	15; 21	21; 9	21; 17
4	(Germany) (Bulgaria)	Johanna Goliszewski / Juliane Schenk; Petya Nedelcheva / Linda Zetchiri				not played
5	(Germany) (Bulgaria)	Sandra Marinello / Birgit Overzier; Diana Dimova / Dimitria Popstoikova				not played

=== Scotland vs. Russia ===
Scotland
0
Arena Ursynów, Court 2
19 February 2010, 14:00 UTC+1

Russia
3

			1	2	3
1	(Scotland) (Russia)	Susan Egelstaff; Ella Diehl	12; 21	12; 21
2	(Scotland) (Russia)	Linda Sloan; Tatjana Bibik	14; 21	9; 21
3	(Scotland) (Russia)	Imogen Bankier / Emma Mason; Valeria Sorokina / Nina Vislova	11; 21	15; 21
4	(Scotland) (Russia)	Kirsty Gilmour; Anastasia Prokopenko				not played
5	(Scotland) (Russia)	Jillie Cooper / Linda Sloan; Olga Arkhangelskaya / Tatjana Bibik				not played

== Semi-finals ==
=== Denmark vs. Germany ===
Denmark
3
Arena Ursynów, Court 1
20 February 2010, 12:00 UTC+1

Germany
1

			1	2	3
1	(Denmark) (Germany)	Tine Rasmussen; Juliane Schenk	21; 16	21; 13
2	(Denmark) (Germany)	Lena Frier Kristiansen / Kamilla Rytter Juhl; Sandra Marinello / Birgit Overzier	17; 21	22; 24
3	(Denmark) (Germany)	Camilla Sørensen; Karin Schnaase	21; 13	21; 16
4	(Denmark) (Germany)	Helle Nielsen / Marie Røpke; Johanna Goliszewski / Juliane Schenk	18; 21	21; 15	21; 13
5	(Denmark) (Germany)	Karina Jørgensen; Fabienne Deprez				not played

=== Russia vs. Netherlands ===
Russia
3
Arena Ursynów, Court 2
20 February 2010, 12:00 UTC+1

Netherlands
0

			1	2	3
1	(Russia) (Netherlands)	Ella Diehl; Patty Stolzenbach	21; 17	21; 7
2	(Russia) (Netherlands)	Tatjana Bibik; Yik-Man Wong	21; 13	21; 6
3	(Russia) (Netherlands)	Valeria Sorokina / Nina Vislova; Lotte Jonathans / Paulien van Doormalen	21; 12	21; 18
4	(Russia) (Netherlands)	Anastasia Prokopenko; Iris Tabeling				not played
5	(Russia) (Netherlands)	Olga Arkhangelskaya / Tatjana Bibik; Samantha Barning / Selena Piek				not played

== Third place play-off ==
=== Germany vs. Netherlands ===
Germany
3
Arena Ursynów, Court 2
21 February 2010, 12:00 UTC+1

Netherlands
0

			1	2	3
1	(Germany) (Netherlands)	Juliane Schenk; Patty Stolzenbach	21; 16	21; 18
2	(Germany) (Netherlands)	Sandra Marinello / Birgit Overzier; Lotte Jonathans / Paulien van Doormalen	16; 21	21; 10	21; 19
3	(Germany) (Netherlands)	Karin Schnaase; Thamar Peters	21; 14	21; 14
4	(Germany) (Netherlands)	Johanna Goliszewski / Juliane Schenk; Samantha Barning / Selena Piek				not played
5	(Germany) (Netherlands)	Fabienne Deprez; Iris Tabeling				not played

== Final ==
=== Denmark vs. Russia ===
Denmark
3
Arena Ursynów, Court 1
21 February 2010, 12:00 UTC+1

Russia
2

			1	2	3
1	(Denmark) (Russia)	Tine Rasmussen; Ella Diehl	21; 8	21; 14
2	(Denmark) (Russia)	Camilla Sørensen; Tatjana Bibik	12; 21	11; 21
3	(Denmark) (Russia)	Karina Jørgensen; Anastasia Prokopenko	21; 19	16; 21	16; 21
4	(Denmark) (Russia)	Lena Frier Kristiansen / Kamilla Rytter Juhl; Tatjana Bibik / Olga Golovanova	21; 14	21; 14
5	(Denmark) (Russia)	Helle Nielsen / Marie Røpke; Anastasia Prokopenko / Valeria Sorokina	21; 17	22; 20
