= 2003 European Junior Badminton Championships =

Tournament details
- Dates: 12–19 April 2003
- Venue: Esbjerg Badminton Center
- Location: Esbjerg, Denmark

The 2003 European Junior Badminton Championships were the 18th tournament of the European Junior Badminton Championships. They were held in Esbjerg, Denmark, from 12–19 April 2003.

== Medalists ==
Event	Gold	Silver	Bronze
Boys' singles	(Germany) Marc Zwiebler	(Denmark) Rune Ulsing	(Finland) Ville Lång
Boys' singles	(Germany) Marc Zwiebler	(Denmark) Rune Ulsing	(Poland) Rafał Hawel
Girls' singles	(Ukraine) Larisa Griga	(Denmark) Nanna Brosolat Jensen	(Finland) Maria Väisänen
Girls' singles	(Ukraine) Larisa Griga	(Denmark) Nanna Brosolat Jensen	(England) Jenny Day
Boys' doubles	(Denmark) Mikkel Delbo Larsen (Denmark) Martin Bille Larsen	(Denmark) Søren Frandsen (Denmark) Mads Hallas	(Russia) Ivan Baboshin (Russia) Anton Nazarenko
Boys' doubles	(Denmark) Mikkel Delbo Larsen (Denmark) Martin Bille Larsen	(Denmark) Søren Frandsen (Denmark) Mads Hallas	(Netherlands) Ruud Bosch (Netherlands) Dave Khodabux
Girls' doubles	(Russia) Nina Vislova (Russia) Valeria Sorokina	(Germany) Therésè Nawrath (Germany) Birgit Overzier	(Russia) Olga Kozlova (Russia) Anastasia Kudinova
Girls' doubles	(Russia) Nina Vislova (Russia) Valeria Sorokina	(Germany) Therésè Nawrath (Germany) Birgit Overzier	(Germany) Carola Bott (Germany) Karin Schnaase
Mixed doubles	(Germany) Marc Zwiebler (Germany) Birgit Overzier	(Russia) Dmitri Pankov (Russia) Nina Vislova	(Russia) Anton Nazarenko (Russia) Valeria Sorokina
Mixed doubles	(Germany) Marc Zwiebler (Germany) Birgit Overzier	(Russia) Dmitri Pankov (Russia) Nina Vislova	(Denmark) Jacob Chemnitz (Denmark) Mille Pjedsted
Teams	Germany; Marc Zwiebler; Olaf Schulz-Holstege; Andreas Kämmer; Fabian Zilm; Dieter Domke; Jan-Sören Schulz; Birgit Overzier; Carola Bott; Karin Schnaase; Therese Nawrath; Isabelle Althof	Denmark; Jacob Chemnitz; Jacob Damgaard Eriksen; Søren Frandsen; Mads Hallas; Martin Bille Larsen; Mikkel Delbo Larsen; Rune Ulsing; Nanna Brosolat Jensen; Pernille Levinsky; Lykke Møller; Mille Pjedsted; Mie Schjøtt-Kristensen; Camilla Sørensen	Russia; Ivan Baboshin; Anton Nazarenko; Pavel Orlov; Dmitri Pankov; Olga Kozlova; Anastasia Kudinova; Valeria Sorokina; Nina Vislova

== Results ==
=== Semi-finals ===
Category	Winner	Runner-up	Score
Boys' singles	(Germany) Marc Zwiebler	(Finland) Ville Lång	15–8, 15–6
Boys' singles	(Denmark) Rune Ulsing	(Poland) Rafał Hawel	15–10, 15–13
Girls' singles	(Ukraine) Larisa Griga	(England) Jenny Day	11–7, 11–0
Girls' singles	(Denmark) Nanna Brosolat Jensen	(Finland) Maria Väisänen	11–4, 11–4
Boys' doubles	(Denmark) Mikkel Delbo Larsen (Denmark) Martin Bille Larsen	(Russia) Ivan Baboschin (Russia) Anton Nazarenko	15–1, 15–6
Boys' doubles	(Denmark) Søren Frandsen (Denmark) Mads Hallas	(Netherlands) Ruud Bosch (Netherlands) Dave Khodabux	15–5, 8–15, 15–6
Girls' doubles	(Germany) Therésè Nawrath (Germany) Birgit Overzier	(Russia) Olga Kozlova (Russia) Anastasia Kudinova	9–11, 11–7, 11–3
Girls' doubles	(Russia) Valeria Sorokina (Russia) Nina Vislova	(Germany) Carola Bott (Germany) Karin Schnaase	11–5, 11–2
Mixed doubles	(Germany) Marc Zwiebler (Germany) Birgit Overzier	(Russia) Anton Nazarenko (Russia) Valeria Sorokina	11–9, 11–9
Mixed doubles	(Russia) Dmitri Pankov (Russia) Nina Vislova	(Denmark) Jacob Chemnitz (Denmark) Mille Pjedsted	13–10, 11–2

=== Finals ===
Category	Winners	Runners-up	Score
Men's singles	(Germany) Marc Zwiebler	(Denmark) Rune Ulsing	15–12, 15–10
Women's singles	(Ukraine) Larisa Griga	(Denmark) Nanna Brosolat Jensen	11–9, 11–9
Men's doubles	(Denmark) Mikkel Delbo Larsen (Denmark) Martin Bille Larsen	(Denmark) Søren Frandsen (Denmark) Mads Hallas	6–15, 15–6, 15–11
Women's doubles	(Russia) Nina Vislova (Russia) Valeria Sorokina	(Germany) Therésè Nawrath (Germany) Birgit Overzier	5–11, 11–5, 11–0
Mixed doubles	(Germany) Marc Zwiebler (Germany) Birgit Overzier	(Russia) Dmitri Pankov (Russia) Nina Vislova	11–7, 11–1
