= Carola Bott =

German badminton player (born 1984)

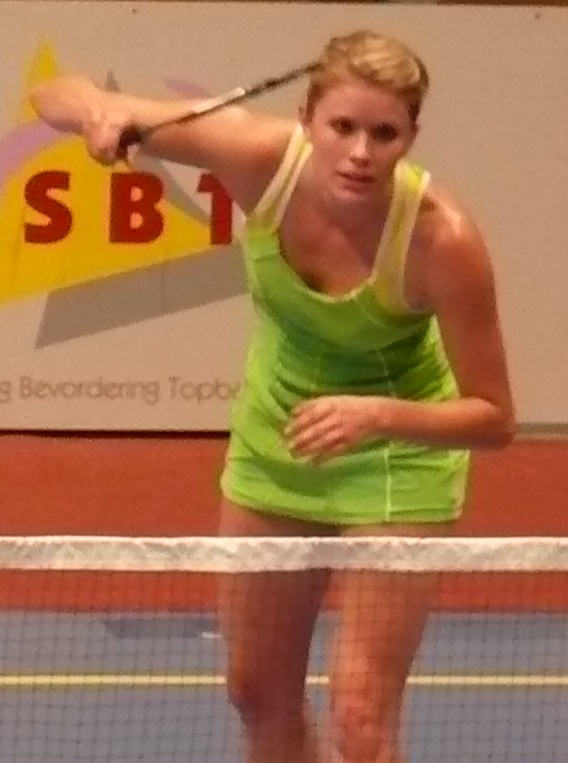
- Bott at the 2007 Dutch Open Grand Prix

Personal information
- Born: 9 July 1984 (age 42) Aschaffenburg, Germany

Sport
- Country: Germany
- Sport: Badminton
- Handedness: Right

Women's & mixed doubles
- Highest ranking: 78 (WD) 25 Aug 2011; 64 (XD) 3 Sep 2015
- BWF profile
Medal record
Badminton
Representing Germany
Uber Cup
Bronze medal – third place	2008 Jakarta	Women's team
European Mixed Team Championships
Silver medal – second place	2011 Amsterdam	Mixed team
European Women's Team Championships
Bronze medal – third place	2010 Warsaw	Women's team
Bronze medal – third place	2008 Almere	Women's team
European Junior Championships
Gold medal – first place	2003 Esbjerg	Mixed team
Bronze medal – third place	2003 Esbjerg	Girls' doubles

Carola Bott (born 9 July 1984) is a German female badminton player. In 2003, she won bronze medal at the European Junior Badminton Championships in girls' doubles event with Karin Schnaase.

== Achievements ==
=== European Junior Championships ===
Girls' Doubles
Year	Venue	Partner	Opponent	Score	Result
2003	Esbjerg, Denmark	(Germany) Karin Schnaase	(Russia) Nina Vislova (Russia) Valeria Sorokina	5–11, 2–15	Bronze

=== BWF International Challenge/Series ===
Women's singles
Year	Tournament	Opponent	Score	Result
2012	Slovenian International	(Switzerland) Nicole Schaller	19–21, 14–21	(silver) Runner-up
2011	Swiss International	(India) P. V. Sindhu	11-21, 11–21	(silver) Runner-up
2011	Slovenian International	(Finland) Nanna Vainio	21-13, 21-10	(gold) Winner
2007	Kalev International	(Estonia) Kati Tolmoff	14-21, 19-21	(silver) Runner-up

Women's doubles
Year	Tournament	Partner	Opponent	Score	Result
2015	Portugal International	(Germany) Jennifer Karnott	(Japan) Ayane Kurihara (Japan) Naru Shinoya	13–21, 16-21	(silver) Runner-up
2012	Hungarian International	(Croatia) Staša Poznanović	(Denmark) Julie Finne-Ipsen (Denmark) Rikke S. Hansen	21-17, 23–21	(gold) Winner

BWF International Challenge tournament
BWF International Series tournament
