= Anton Nazarenko =

Russian badminton player (born 1984)

Anton Nazarenko Антон Назаренко
Personal information
- Born: Антон Сергеевич Назаренко; Anton Sergeevich Nazarenko; 24 July 1984 (age 42) Moscow, Russian SFSR, Soviet Union

Sport
- Country: Russia
- Sport: Badminton

Men's & mixed doubles
- Highest ranking: 148 (MD 15 September 2016)
- BWF profile
Medal record
Men's badminton
Representing Russia
European Junior Championships
Bronze medal – third place	2001 Spała	Mixed team
Bronze medal – third place	2003 Esbjerg	Boys' doubles
Bronze medal – third place	2003 Esbjerg	Mixed doubles
Bronze medal – third place	2003 Esbjerg	Mixed team

Anton Sergeevich Nazarenko (Russian: Антон Сергеевич Назаренко; born 24 July 1984) is a Russian badminton player.

== Achievements ==
=== European Junior Championships ===
Boys' doubles
Year	Venue	Partner	Opponent	Score	Result
2003	Esbjerg Badminton Center; Esbjerg, Denmark	(Russia) Ivan Baboshin	(Denmark) Mikkel Delbo Larsen (Denmark) Martin Bille Larsen	1–15, 6–15	Bronze

Mixed doubles
Year	Venue	Partner	Opponent	Score	Result
2003	Esbjerg Badminton Center; Esbjerg, Denmark	(Russia) Valeria Sorokina	(Germany) Marc Zwiebler (Germany) Birgit Overzier	9–11, 9–11	Bronze

=== BWF International Challenge/Series ===
Men's doubles
Year	Tournament	Partner	Opponent	Score	Result
2006	Kalev International	(Russia) Andrey Ashmarin	(Poland) Adam Cwalina (Poland) Rafał Hawel	21–17, 21–15	(gold) Winner
2006	Riga International	(Russia) Andrey Ashmarin	(Scotland) David T. Forbes (Scotland) Stewart Kerr		(silver) Runner-up
2006	Norwegian International	(Russia) Andrey Ashmarin	(Denmark) Christopher Bruun Jensen (Denmark) Morten T. Kronborg	19–21, 21–13, 21–18	(gold) Winner
2006	Bulgarian International	(Russia) Andrey Ashmarin	(Denmark) Rasmus Mangor Andersen (Denmark) Peter Steffensen	12–21, 17–21	(silver) Runner-up
2016	Latvia International	(Russia) Andrei Ivanov	(Russia) Vladimir Nikulov (Russia) Artem Serpionov	21–16, 21–15	(gold) Winner
2016	Lithuanian International	(Russia) Andrei Ivanov	(Poland) Łukasz Moreń (Poland) Wojciech Szkudlarczyk	21–11, 17–21, 19–21	(silver) Runner-up

Mixed doubles
Year	Tournament	Partner	Opponent	Score	Result
2006	Riga International	(Russia) Elena Chernyavskya	(Estonia) Ants Mängel (Estonia) Karoliine Hõim		(gold) Winner
2006	Bulgarian International	(Russia) Elena Chernyavskya	(Germany) Tim Dettmann (Germany) Annekatrin Lillie	15–21, 16–21	(silver) Runner-up
2007	Kalev International	(Russia) Evgenia Antipova	(Austria) Heimo Götschl (Austria) Claudia Mayer	22–20, 12–21, 21–8	(gold) Winner
2007	Czech International	(Russia) Elena Chernyavskya	(Denmark) Rasmus Bonde (Denmark) Christinna Pedersen	19–21, 12–21	(silver) Runner-up
2007	Slovak International	(Russia) Elena Chernyavskya	(Russia) Elena Shimko (Russia) Andrey Ashmarin	21–11, 21–19	(gold) Winner

BWF International Challenge tournament
BWF International Series tournament
BWF Future Series tournament
