= 2010 European Men's Team Badminton Championships knockout stage =

This article lists the full results for knockout stage of 2010 European Men's Team Badminton Championships.

== Bracket ==
Quarter-finals
19 February 2010
Denmark
BYE
Germany	3
Russia	2
Ukraine	3
Netherlands	0
BYE
Poland

Semi-finals
20 February 2010
Denmark	3
Germany	0
Ukraine	2
Poland	3

Final
21 February 2010
Denmark	3
Poland	0
Third place
21 February 2010
Germany	3
Ukraine	1

== Quarter-finals ==
=== Ukraine vs. Netherlands ===
Ukraine
3
Arena Ursynów, Court 1
19 February 2010, 18:00 UTC+1

Netherlands
0

			1	2	3
1	(Ukraine) (Netherlands)	Dmytro Zavadsky; Rune Massing	21; 12	21; 13
2	(Ukraine) (Netherlands)	Valeriy Atrashchenkov; Lester Oey	21; 12	21; 12
3	(Ukraine) (Netherlands)	Vladislav Druzchenko; Saber Afif	21; 13	19; 21	21; 13
4	(Ukraine) (Netherlands)	Vitaliy Konov / Dmytro Zavadsky; Lester Oey / Koen Ridder				not played
5	(Ukraine) (Netherlands)	Valeriy Atrashchenkov / Vladislav Druzchenko; Jacco Arends / Dave Khodabux				not played

=== Germany vs. Russia ===
Germany
3
Arena Ursynów, Court 2
19 February 2010, 18:00 UTC+1

Russia
2

			1	2	3
1	(Germany) (Russia)	Marc Zwiebler; Vladimir Malkov	21; 9	21; 9
2	(Germany) (Russia)	Marcel Reuter; Vladimir Ivanov	22; 20	25; 23
3	(Germany) (Russia)	Fabian Hammes; Stanislav Pukhov	14; 21	7; 21
4	(Germany) (Russia)	Michael Fuchs / Ingo Kindervater; Vitalij Durkin / Alexandr Nikolaenko	17; 21	15; 21
5	(Germany) (Russia)	Kristof Hopp / Johannes Schöttler; Evgenij Dremin / Stanislav Pukhov	16; 21	21; 19	21; 15

== Semi-finals ==
=== Denmark vs. Germany ===
Denmark
3
Arena Ursynów, Court 2
20 February 2010, 16:00 UTC+1

Germany
0

			1	2	3
1	(Denmark) (Germany)	Peter Gade; Marc Zwiebler	21; 6	21; 13
2	(Denmark) (Germany)	Mathias Boe / Carsten Mogensen; Michael Fuchs / Ingo Kindervater	21; 17	21; 18
3	(Denmark) (Germany)	Jan Ø. Jørgensen; Marc Zwiebler	21; 12	15; 21	21; 16
4	(Denmark) (Germany)	Anders Kristiansen / Jonas Rasmussen; Kristof Hopp / Johannes Schöttler				not played
5	(Denmark) (Germany)	Joachim Persson; Fabian Hammes				not played

=== Ukraine vs. Poland ===
Ukraine
2
Arena Ursynów, Court 1
20 February 2010, 16:00 UTC+1

Poland
3

			1	2	3
1	(Ukraine) (Poland)	Dmytro Zavadsky; Przemysław Wacha	21; 9	15; 21	14; 21
2	(Ukraine) (Poland)	Valeriy Atrashchenkov; Hubert Pączek	15; 21	21; 17	21; 12
3	(Ukraine) (Poland)	Vitaliy Konov; Rafał Hawel	22; 20	21; 23	21; 19
4	(Ukraine) (Poland)	Valeriy Atrashchenkov / Vladislav Druzchenko; Robert Mateusiak / Przemysław Wacha	13; 21	21; 14	15; 21
5	(Ukraine) (Poland)	Vitaliy Konov / Dmytro Zavadsky; Adam Cwalina / Michał Łogosz	6; 21	12; 21

== Third place play-off ==
=== Germany vs. Ukraine ===
Germany
3
Arena Ursynów, Court 2
21 February 2010, 16:00 UTC+1

Ukraine
1

			1	2	3
1	(Germany) (Ukraine)	Marc Zwiebler; Dmytro Zavadsky	21; 16	27; 25
2	(Germany) (Ukraine)	Dieter Domke; Valeriy Atrashchenkov	19; 21	21; 19	12; 21
3	(Germany) (Ukraine)	Marcel Reuter; Vitaliy Konov	21; 15	21; 6
4	(Germany) (Ukraine)	Kristof Hopp / Johannes Schöttler; Valeriy Atrashchenkov / Vladislav Druzchenko	22; 24	21; 8	21; 17
5	(Germany) (Ukraine)	Michael Fuchs / Ingo Kindervater; Vitaliy Konov / Dmytro Zavadsky				not played

== Final ==
=== Denmark vs. Poland ===
Denmark
3
Arena Ursynów, Court 1
21 February 2010, 16:00 UTC+1

Poland
0

			1	2	3
1	(Denmark) (Poland)	Peter Gade; Przemysław Wacha	21; 16	21; 17
2	(Denmark) (Poland)	Mathias Boe / Carsten Mogensen; Adam Cwalina / Michał Łogosz	21; 15	21; 13
3	(Denmark) (Poland)	Jan Ø. Jørgensen; Hubert Pączek	21; 14	21; 13
4	(Denmark) (Poland)	Jonas Rasmussen / Anders Kristiansen; Robert Mateusiak / Łukasz Moreń				not played
5	(Denmark) (Poland)	Joachim Persson; Rafał Hawel				not played
