= Rafał Hawel =

Polish badminton player (born 1984)

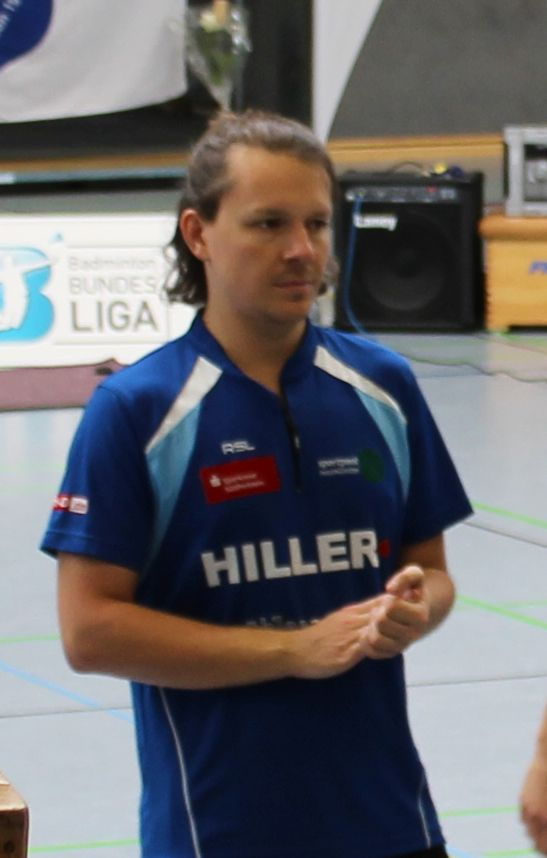
- Hawel in 2014

Personal information
- Born: 11 September 1984 (age 42)

Sport
- Country: Poland
- Sport: Badminton

Men's singles & doubles
- Highest ranking: 356 (MS 11 March 2010); 623 (MD 21 March 2013)
- BWF profile
Medal record
Men's badminton
Representing Poland
European Mixed Team Championships
Bronze medal – third place	2008 Herning	Mixed team
European Men's Team Championships
Silver medal – second place	2010 Warsaw	Men's team
European Junior Championships
Bronze medal – third place	2003 Esbjerg	Boys' singles

Rafał Hawel (born 11 September 1984) is a Polish badminton player from the SKB Piast Słupsk team. Hawel started his junior career as Technik Głubczyce player, and at the Polish Junior championships, he won the boys' singles and doubles title in 2002 and 2003. He also won the bronze medal at the 2003 European Junior Championships. In the senior event, he won the national championships in 2006 partnered with Przemysław Wacha in the men's doubles and in 2011 with Kamila Augustyn in the mixed doubles event.

== Achievements ==
=== European Junior Championships ===
Boys' singles
Year	Venue	Opponent	Score	Result
2003	Esbjerg Badminton Center; Esbjerg, Denmark	(Denmark) Rune Ulsing	10–15, 13–15	Bronze

=== BWF International Challenge/Series ===
Men's singles
Year	Tournament	Opponent	Score	Result
2004	Lithuanian International	(Czech Republic) Petr Koukal	3–15, 15–13, 15–4	(gold) Winner
2005	Lithuanian International	(Lithuania) Kęstutis Navickas	8–15, 15–10, 15–5	(gold) Winner

Men's doubles
Year	Tournament	Partner	Opponent	Score	Result
2006	Estonian International	(Poland) Adam Cwalina	(Russia) Andrey Ashmarin (Russia) Anton Nazarenko	17–21, 15–21	(silver) Runner-up

Mixed doubles
Year	Tournament	Partner	Opponent	Score	Result
2011	Polish Open	(Poland) Kamila Augustyn	(Poland) Robert Mateusiak (Poland) Nadieżda Zięba	13–21, 17–21	(silver) Runner-up

BWF International Challenge tournament
BWF International Series tournament
