= Laura Sárosi =

Hungarian badminton player (born 1992)

Personal information
- Born: 11 November 1992 (age 34) Budapest, Hungary
- Height: 1.67 m (5 ft 6 in)
- Weight: 57 kg (126 lb)

Sport
- Country: Hungary
- Sport: Badminton
- Handedness: Right
- Coached by: Yasen Borisov

Women's singles
- Highest ranking: 64 (18 August 2016)
- BWF profile

Laura Sárosi (born 11 November 1992) is a Hungarian badminton player. She competed at the 2016 Summer Olympics and the 2020 Summer Olympics.

== 2016 European Championships ==
During the 2016 European Championships held in France, Sárosi was eliminated in the second round. She beat Croatian Dorotea Sutara 21–8, 21–5 in the first round, before losing to Karin Schnaase of Germany, 21–16, 14–21, 18–21. During the match, Sárosi loaned her spare shoes to her opponent, after one of Schnaase's own shoes had fallen apart during the first set. The result meant that Sárosi did not gain enough ranking points to qualify directly for the 2016 Summer Olympics and was instead named as the second reserve. Sárosi was later given a place in the Games after unused Tripartite Commission wildcards were reallocated.

== Achievements ==
=== BWF International Challenge/Series (10 titles, 6 runners-up) ===
Women's singles
| Year | Tournament | Opponent | Score | Result |
|---|---|---|---|---|
| 2013 | Irish International | (France) Delphine Lansac | 16–21, 17–21 | (silver) Runner-up |
| 2014 | Romanian International | (France) Delphine Lansac | 20–22, 14–21 | (silver) Runner-up |
| 2015 | Giraldilla International | (Turkey) Ebru Tunalı | 15–21, 8–21 | (silver) Runner-up |
| 2015 | Chile International | (Brazil) Lohaynny Vicente | 21–13, 9–21, 21–12 | (gold) Winner |
| 2015 | Turkey International | (Estonia) Kati Tolmoff | 13–21, 11–21 | (silver) Runner-up |
| 2015 | Brazil International | (Brazil) Fabiana Silva | 18–21, 21–18, 21–13 | (gold) Winner |
| 2015 | Puerto Rico International | (Italy) Jeanine Cicognini | 21–12, 21–16 | (gold) Winner |
| 2015 | South Africa International | (Portugal) Telma Santos | 20–22, 17–21 | (silver) Runner-up |
| 2015 | Botswana International | (Mauritius) Kate Foo Kune | 21–10, 21–14 | (gold) Winner |
| 2017 | Giraldilla International | (Mexico) Mariana Ugalde | 21–19, 21–15 | (gold) Winner |
| 2017 | Slovak Open | (Ukraine) Maryna Ilyinskaya | 21–12, 21–14 | (gold) Winner |
| 2018 | Hellas Open | (Germany) Luise Heim | 9–21, 11–21 | (silver) Runner-up |
| 2019 | Croatian International | (India) Tanvi Lad | 21–18, 21–13 | (gold) Winner |
| 2021 | Peru International | (Hungary) Daniella Gonda | 21–15, 21–12 | (gold) Winner |
| 2021 | Portugal International | (France) Marie Batomene | 21–19, 21–19 | (gold) Winner |

Women's doubles
| Year | Tournament | Partner | Opponent | Score | Result |
|---|---|---|---|---|---|
| 2017 | Giraldilla International | (Mexico) Mariana Ugalde | (Italy) Silvia Garino (Italy) Lisa Iversen | 21–15, 21–17 | (gold) Winner |

BWF International Challenge tournament
BWF International Series tournament
BWF Future Series tournament
