= Karin Schnaase =

German badminton player

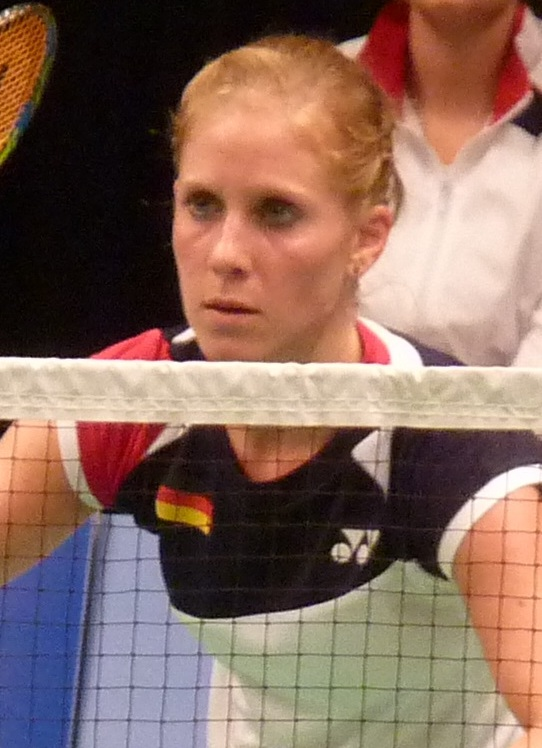
- Schnaase at the 2013 Dutch Open Grand Prix

Personal information
- Born: 14 February 1985 (age 41) Lüdinghausen, West Germany
- Height: 1.64 m (5 ft 5 in)
- Weight: 56 kg (123 lb)

Sport
- Country: Germany
- Sport: Badminton
- Handedness: Right

Women's singles
- Highest ranking: 24 (26 March 2015)
- BWF profile
Medal record
Women's badminton
Representing Germany
Uber Cup
| Bronze medal – third place | 2008 Jakarta | Women's team |
European Mixed Team Championships
| Gold medal – first place | 2013 Moscow | Mixed team |
| Silver medal – second place | 2011 Amsterdam | Mixed team |
| Bronze medal – third place | 2015 Leuven | Mixed team |
European Women's Team Championships
| Gold medal – first place | 2012 Amsterdam | Women's team |
| Bronze medal – third place | 2016 Kazan | Women's team |
| Bronze medal – third place | 2014 Basel | Women's team |
| Bronze medal – third place | 2010 Warsaw | Women's team |
| Bronze medal – third place | 2008 Almere | Women's team |
European Junior Championships
| Gold medal – first place | 2003 Esbjerg | Mixed team |
| Bronze medal – third place | 2003 Esbjerg | Girls' doubles |

Karin Schnaase (born 14 February 1985) is a German badminton player. She represented her country at the 2016 Summer Olympics. She placed 2nd in her group during group play and did not advance to the next round. She is well known for the broken shoe incident with Laura Sarosi at the 2016 European Badminton Championships, where Sarosi handed her spare shoe to make Schnaase able to continue the match. Schnaase later won the match which made Sarosi unable to gain more points for Olympic badminton qualification.

== Achievements ==
=== European Junior Championships ===
Girls' doubles
| Year | Venue | Partner | Opponent | Score | Result |
|---|---|---|---|---|---|
| 2003 | Esbjerg, Denmark | (Germany) Carola Bott | (Russia) Nina Vislova (Russia) Valeria Sorokina | 5–11, 2–11 | Bronze |

=== BWF Grand Prix ===
The BWF Grand Prix has two levels, the BWF Grand Prix and Grand Prix Gold. It is a series of badminton tournaments sanctioned by the Badminton World Federation (BWF) since 2007.

Women's singles
| Year | Tournament | Opponent | Score | Result |
|---|---|---|---|---|
| 2015 | Dutch Open | (Scotland) Kirsty Gilmour | 16–21, 13–21 | (silver) Runner-up |

BWF Grand Prix Gold tournament
BWF Grand Prix tournament

=== BWF International Challenge/Series ===
Women's singles
| Year | Tournament | Opponent | Score | Result |
|---|---|---|---|---|
| 2016 | Peru International | (United States) Iris Wang | 21–6, 21–17 | (gold) Winner |
| 2016 | Swedish Masters | (Germany) Olga Konon | 21–16, 20–22, 21–19 | (gold) Winner |
| 2015 | Turkey International | (Estonia) Kati Tolmoff | 21–17, 21–5 | (gold) Winner |
| 2015 | Polish Open | (Ukraine) Marija Ulitina | 21–19, 21–15 | (gold) Winner |
| 2013 | Dutch International | (Spain) Beatriz Corrales | 16–21, 18–21 | (silver) Runner-up |
| 2012 | Belgian International | (France) Sashina Vignes Waran | 21–15, 22–24, 9–17 Retired | (silver) Runner-up |
| 2010 | Finnish International | (Russia) Anastasia Prokopenko | 18–21, 18–21 | (silver) Runner-up |
| 2010 | Hungarian International | (Greece) Anne Hald-Jensen | 21–15, 21–16 | (gold) Winner |

BWF International Challenge tournament
BWF International Series tournament
BWF Future Series tournament
