= 2010 European Men's and Women's Team Badminton Championships =

Tournament details
- Dates: 16-21 February 2010
- Venue: Arena Ursynów
- Location: Warsaw, Poland

The 2010 European Men's and Women's Team Badminton Championships was held in Warsaw, Poland, from February 16 to February 21, 2010. This tournament also serves as European qualification for the 2010 Thomas & Uber Cup.

== Medalists ==
Event	Gold	Silver	Bronze
Men's Team	Denmark	Poland	Germany
Women's Team	Denmark	Russia	Germany

== Men's team ==
=== Group stage ===
==== Group A ====
Pos	Team	Pld	W	L	MF	MA	MD	GF	GA	GD	PF	PA	PD	Pts	Qualification	Denmark	Finland	Croatia	Iceland	Hungary
1	Denmark	4	4	0	20	0	+20	40	1	+39	858	502	+356	4	Knockout stage	—	5–0	5–0	5–0	5–0
2	Finland	4	3	1	13	7	+6	27	14	+13	781	723	+58	3			—	4–1	4–1	5–0
3	Croatia	4	2	2	9	11	−2	20	24	−4	773	811	−38	2				—	3–2	5–0
4	Iceland	4	1	3	6	14	−8	13	30	−17	689	814	−125	1					—	3–2
5	Hungary	4	0	4	2	18	−16	6	37	−31	609	860	−251	0						—

Source: BWF

==== Group B ====
Pos	Team	Pld	W	L	MF	MA	MD	GF	GA	GD	PF	PA	PD	Pts	Qualification	Poland	England	Spain	Austria	Lithuania
1	Poland (H)	4	4	0	16	4	+12	33	10	+23	850	628	+222	4	Knockout stage	—	3–2	4–1	4–1	5–0
2	England	4	3	1	17	3	+14	34	11	+23	903	659	+244	3			—	5–0	5–0	5–0
3	Spain	4	2	2	9	11	−2	22	22	0	797	817	−20	2				—	3–2	5–0
4	Austria	4	1	3	8	12	−4	18	25	−7	703	765	−62	1					—	5–0
5	Lithuania	4	0	4	0	20	−20	1	40	−39	477	861	−384	0						—

Source: BWF
(H) Host

==== Group C ====
Pos	Team	Pld	W	L	MF	MA	MD	GF	GA	GD	PF	PA	PD	Pts	Qualification	Netherlands	Ireland	Estonia	Greece
1	Netherlands	3	3	0	13	2	+11	27	5	+22	643	471	+172	3	Knockout stage	—	4–1	4–1	5–0
2	Ireland	3	2	1	8	7	+1	19	16	+3	649	577	+72	2			—	3–2	4–1
3	Estonia	3	1	2	7	8	−1	15	17	−2	564	575	−11	1				—	4–1
4	Greece	3	0	3	2	13	−11	4	27	−23	403	636	−233	0					—

Source: BWF

==== Group D ====
Pos	Team	Pld	W	L	MF	MA	MD	GF	GA	GD	PF	PA	PD	Pts	Qualification	Germany	Czech Republic	Scotland	Bulgaria
1	Germany	3	3	0	15	0	+15	30	2	+28	660	436	+224	3	Knockout stage	—	5–0	5–0	5–0
2	Czech Republic	3	1	2	6	9	−3	13	19	−6	550	603	−53	1			—	4–1	2–3
3	Scotland	3	1	2	5	10	−5	12	21	−9	559	619	−60	1				—	4–1
4	Bulgaria	3	1	2	4	11	−7	10	23	−13	532	643	−111	1					—

Source: BWF

==== Group E ====
Pos	Team	Pld	W	L	MF	MA	MD	GF	GA	GD	PF	PA	PD	Pts	Qualification	Russia	Sweden	Slovakia	Italy
1	Russia	3	3	0	13	2	+11	28	6	+22	687	472	+215	3	Knockout stage	—	4–1	5–0	4–1
2	Sweden	3	2	1	11	4	+7	24	8	+16	631	462	+169	2			—	5–0	5–0
3	Slovakia	3	1	2	4	11	−7	10	22	−12	451	608	−157	1				—	4–1
4	Italy	3	0	3	2	13	−11	2	28	−26	374	601	−227	0					—

Source: BWF

==== Group F ====
Pos	Team	Pld	W	L	MF	MA	MD	GF	GA	GD	PF	PA	PD	Pts	Qualification	Ukraine	France	Wales	Portugal
1	Ukraine	3	3	0	11	4	+7	25	8	+17	654	531	+123	3	Knockout stage	—	4–1	3–2	4–1
2	France	3	2	1	9	6	+3	18	13	+5	599	508	+91	2			—	3–2	5–0
3	Wales	3	1	2	9	6	+3	18	15	+3	573	591	−18	1				—	5–0
4	Portugal	3	0	3	1	14	−13	4	29	−25	488	684	−196	0					—

Source: BWF

=== Knockout stage ===
Quarter-finals
19 February 2010
Denmark
BYE
Germany	3
Russia	2
Ukraine	3
Netherlands	0
BYE
Poland

Semi-finals
20 February 2010
Denmark	3
Germany	0
Ukraine	2
Poland	3

Final
21 February 2010
Denmark	3
Poland	0
Third place
21 February 2010
Germany	3
Ukraine	1

=== Final ranking ===
Pos	Team	Pld	W	L	Pts	MD	GD	PD	Final result
1st place, gold medalist(s)	Denmark	6	6	0	6	+26	+50	+432	Champions
2nd place, silver medalist(s)	Poland (H)	6	5	1	5	+10	+19	+207	Runners-up
3rd place, bronze medalist(s)	Germany	6	5	1	5	+15	+28	+220	Third place
4	Ukraine	6	4	2	4	+7	+16	+115	Fourth place
5	Russia	4	3	1	3	+10	+21	+215	Eliminated in quarter-finals
6	Netherlands	4	3	1	3	+8	+17	+123	Eliminated in quarter-finals
7	England	4	3	1	3	+14	+23	+244	Eliminated in group stage
8	Finland	4	3	1	3	+6	+13	+58	Eliminated in group stage
9	Sweden	3	2	1	2	+7	+16	+169	Eliminated in group stage
10	France	3	2	1	2	+3	+5	+91	Eliminated in group stage
11	Ireland	3	2	1	2	+1	+3	+72	Eliminated in group stage
12	Spain	4	2	2	2	−2	0	−20	Eliminated in group stage
13	Croatia	4	2	2	2	−2	−4	−38	Eliminated in group stage
14	Wales	3	1	2	1	+3	+3	−18	Eliminated in group stage
15	Estonia	3	1	2	1	−1	−2	−11	Eliminated in group stage
16	Czech Republic	3	1	2	1	−3	−6	−53	Eliminated in group stage
17	Austria	4	1	3	1	−4	−7	−62	Eliminated in group stage
18	Scotland	3	1	2	1	−5	−9	−60	Eliminated in group stage
19	Bulgaria	3	1	2	1	−7	−13	−111	Eliminated in group stage
20	Iceland	4	1	3	1	−8	−17	−125	Eliminated in group stage
21	Slovakia	3	0	3	0	−7	−12	−157	Eliminated in group stage
22	Italy	3	0	3	0	−11	−26	−227	Eliminated in group stage
23	Portugal	3	0	3	0	−13	−25	−196	Eliminated in group stage
24	Greece	3	0	3	0	−15	−28	−233	Eliminated in group stage
25	Hungary	4	0	4	0	−16	−31	−251	Eliminated in group stage
26	Lithuania	4	0	4	0	−20	−39	−384	Eliminated in group stage

== Women's team ==
=== Group stage ===
==== Group A ====
Pos	Team	Pld	W	L	MF	MA	MD	GF	GA	GD	PF	PA	PD	Pts	Qualification	Denmark	Czech Republic	Estonia	Greece
1	Denmark	3	3	0	15	0	+15	30	0	+30	630	319	+311	3	Knockout stage	—	5–0	5–0	5–0
2	Czech Republic	3	2	1	9	6	+3	18	14	+4	553	517	+36	2			—	4–1	5–0
3	Estonia	3	1	2	6	9	−3	14	18	−4	542	550	−8	1				—	5–0
4	Greece	3	0	3	0	15	−15	0	30	−30	291	630	−339	0					—

Source: BWF

==== Group B ====
Pos	Team	Pld	W	L	MF	MA	MD	GF	GA	GD	PF	PA	PD	Pts	Qualification	Netherlands	Belgium	Belarus	Finland	Latvia
1	Netherlands	4	4	0	18	2	+16	38	4	+34	872	543	+329	4	Knockout stage	—	4–1	4–1	5–0	5–0
2	Belgium	4	3	1	14	6	+8	30	15	+15	852	758	+94	3			—	3–2	5–0	5–0
3	Belarus	4	2	2	11	9	+2	24	23	+1	813	850	−37	2				—	3–2	5–0
4	Finland	4	1	3	6	14	−8	14	31	−17	766	837	−71	1					—	4–1
5	Latvia	4	0	4	1	19	−18	5	38	−33	564	879	−315	0						—

Source: BWF

==== Group C ====
Pos	Team	Pld	W	L	MF	MA	MD	GF	GA	GD	PF	PA	PD	Pts	Qualification	Russia	England	Portugal	Croatia
1	Russia	3	3	0	14	1	+13	28	5	+23	663	436	+227	3	Knockout stage	—	4–1	5–0	5–0
2	England	3	2	1	11	4	+7	24	9	+15	629	513	+116	2			—	5–0	5–0
3	Portugal	3	1	2	3	12	−9	8	25	−17	478	618	−140	1				—	3–2
4	Croatia	3	0	3	2	13	−11	7	28	−21	484	687	−203	0					—

Source: BWF

==== Group D ====
Pos	Team	Pld	W	L	MF	MA	MD	GF	GA	GD	PF	PA	PD	Pts	Qualification	Germany	Spain	Iceland	Sweden
1	Germany	3	3	0	14	1	+13	29	4	+25	678	425	+253	3	Knockout stage	—	4–1	5–0	5–0
2	Spain	3	1	2	6	9	−3	14	19	−5	558	626	−68	1			—	3–2	2–3
3	Iceland	3	1	2	6	9	−3	12	22	−10	555	664	−109	1				—	4–1
4	Sweden	3	1	2	4	11	−7	12	22	−10	565	641	−76	1					—

Source: BWF

==== Group E ====
Pos	Team	Pld	W	L	MF	MA	MD	GF	GA	GD	PF	PA	PD	Pts	Qualification	Scotland	France	Ukraine	Poland
1	Scotland	3	2	1	11	4	+7	20	13	+7	622	599	+23	2	Knockout stage	—	3–2	2–3	4–1
2	France	3	2	1	9	6	+3	22	13	+9	655	599	+56	2			—	5–0	4–1
3	Ukraine	3	1	2	5	10	−5	15	22	−7	644	671	−27	1				—	2–3
4	Poland (H)	3	1	2	5	10	−5	12	21	−9	555	607	−52	1					—

Source: BWF
(H) Host

==== Group F ====
Pos	Team	Pld	W	L	MF	MA	MD	GF	GA	GD	PF	PA	PD	Pts	Qualification	Bulgaria	Wales	Slovakia	Hungary
1	Bulgaria	3	3	0	15	0	+15	30	0	+30	630	297	+333	3	Knockout stage	—	5–0	5–0	5–0
2	Wales	3	2	1	7	8	−1	15	21	−6	613	682	−69	2			—	4–1	3–2
3	Slovakia	3	1	2	4	11	−7	13	24	−11	583	715	−132	1				—	3–2
4	Hungary	3	0	3	4	11	−7	12	25	−13	596	728	−132	0					—

Source: BWF

=== Knockout stage ===
Quarter-finals
19 February 2010
Denmark
BYE
Germany	3
Bulgaria	0
Scotland	0
Russia	3
BYE
Netherlands

Semi-finals
20 February 2010
Denmark	3
Germany	1
Russia	3
Netherlands	0

Final
21 February 2010
Denmark	3
Russia	2
Third place
21 February 2010
Germany	3
Netherlands	0

=== Final ranking ===
Pos	Team	Pld	W	L	Pts	MD	GD	PD	Final result
1st place, gold medalist(s)	Denmark	5	5	0	5	+18	+36	+355	Champions
2nd place, silver medalist(s)	Russia	6	5	1	5	+18	+32	+320	Runners-up
3rd place, bronze medalist(s)	Germany	6	5	1	5	+17	+32	+283	Third place
4	Netherlands	6	4	2	4	+10	+23	+246	Fourth place
5	Bulgaria	4	3	1	3	+12	+25	+302	Eliminated in quarter-finals
6	Scotland	4	2	2	2	+4	+1	−30	Eliminated in quarter-finals
7	Belgium	4	3	1	3	+8	+15	+94	Eliminated in group stage
8	England	3	2	1	2	+7	+15	+116	Eliminated in group stage
9	France	3	2	1	2	+3	+9	+56	Eliminated in group stage
10	Czech Republic	3	2	1	2	+3	+4	+36	Eliminated in group stage
11	Belarus	4	2	2	2	+2	+1	−37	Eliminated in group stage
12	Wales	3	2	1	2	−1	−6	−69	Eliminated in group stage
13	Estonia	3	1	2	1	−3	−4	−8	Eliminated in group stage
14	Spain	3	1	2	1	−3	−5	−68	Eliminated in group stage
15	Iceland	3	1	2	1	−3	−10	−109	Eliminated in group stage
16	Ukraine	3	1	2	1	−5	−7	−27	Eliminated in group stage
17	Poland (H)	3	1	2	1	−5	−9	−52	Eliminated in group stage
18	Sweden	3	1	2	1	−7	−10	−76	Eliminated in group stage
19	Slovakia	3	1	2	1	−7	−11	−132	Eliminated in group stage
20	Finland	4	1	3	1	−8	−17	−71	Eliminated in group stage
21	Portugal	3	1	2	1	−9	−17	−140	Eliminated in group stage
22	Hungary	3	0	3	0	−7	−13	−132	Eliminated in group stage
23	Croatia	3	0	3	0	−11	−21	−203	Eliminated in group stage
24	Greece	3	0	3	0	−15	−30	−339	Eliminated in group stage
25	Latvia	4	0	4	0	−18	−33	−315	Eliminated in group stage
