= 2024 European Junior Badminton Championships – Teams event =

2024 European Junior Badminton Championships – Mixed team
- Venue: Poliesportiu Sa Blanca Dona
- Location: Ibiza, Spain
- Dates: 26 November 2024 – 30 November 2024
- Nations: 30

Medalists
gold medal	Denmark
silver medal	France
bronze medal	Netherlands
bronze medal	Poland

The mixed team tournament of the 2024 European Junior Badminton Championships was held from 26 to 30 November 2024.

== Tournament ==
=== Venue ===
This tournament was held at Poliesportiu Sa Blanca Dona in Ibiza, Spain.

=== Seeds ===
1. France
2. Denmark
3. Ukraine
4. Poland
5. Czech Republic
6. Turkey
7. Germany
8. Spain

=== Draw ===
The draw was announced on 11 November 2024.

Group 1	Group 2	Group 3	Group 4
France; Hungary; Sweden	Cyprus; Denmark; Slovenia	Bulgaria; Latvia; Poland; Slovakia	Finland; Italy; Romania; Ukraine
Group 5	Group 6	Group 7	Group 8
Belgium; Germany; Ireland; Portugal	Austria; England; Netherlands; Spain	Croatia; Czech Republic; Israel; Switzerland	Estonia; Norway; Scotland; Turkey

== Group stage ==
=== Group 1 ===
Pos	Team	Pld	W	L	MF	MA	MD	GF	GA	GD	PF	PA	PD	Pts	Qualification	France	Sweden	Hungary
1	France	2	2	0	8	2	+6	16	5	+11	415	289	+126	2	Advance to knockout stage	—	4–1	4–1
2	Sweden	2	1	1	4	6	−2	9	13	−4	345	408	−63	1			—	3–2
3	Hungary	2	0	2	3	7	−4	8	15	−7	368	431	−63	0				—

Source: TS

==== Sweden vs France ====
Sweden
1
Poliesportiu Sa Blanca Dona, Court 1
26 November 2024, 09:30 UTC+1

France
4

			1	2	3
1	(Sweden) (France)	Felix Lindeblad / Sofia Strömvall; Tom Lalot Trescarte / Elsa Jacob	8; 21	19; 21
2	(Sweden) (France)	Romeo Makboul; Nathan Nguyen	21; 15	21; 16
3	(Sweden) (France)	Matilda Ståhle; Malya Hoareau	6; 21	10; 21
4	(Sweden) (France)	Felix Lindeblad / Romeo Makboul; Thibault Gardon / Tom Lalot Trescarte	16; 21	5; 21
5	(Sweden) (France)	Matilda Ståhle / Sofia Strömvall; Kathell Desmots-Chacun / Elsa Jacob	14; 21	10; 21

==== Hungary vs Sweden ====
Hungary
2
Poliesportiu Sa Blanca Dona, Court 1
27 November 2024, 17:30 UTC+1

Sweden
3

			1	2	3
1	(Hungary) (Sweden)	Csanád Horváth / Petra Hart; Romeo Makboul / Sofia Strömvall	5; 21	13; 21
2	(Hungary) (Sweden)	Milán Mesterházy; Leon Fritz	21; 23	21; 12	21; 15
3	(Hungary) (Sweden)	Zsófi Szabó; Ebba Holmström	21; 8	21; 12
4	(Hungary) (Sweden)	Csanád Horváth / Milán Mesterházy; Erik Blomberg / Felix Lindeblad	21; 19	17; 21	17; 21
5	(Hungary) (Sweden)	Petra Hart / Zsófi Szabó; Matilda Ståhle / Sofia Strömvall	16; 21	15; 21

==== Hungary vs France ====
Hungary
1
Poliesportiu Sa Blanca Dona, Court 3
28 November 2024, 13:30 UTC+1

France
4

			1	2	3
1	(Hungary) (France)	Zsófi Szabó; Elena Phan	21; 16	21; 15
2	(Hungary) (France)	Milán Mesterházy; Arthur Tatranov	21; 15	8; 21	21; 23
3	(Hungary) (France)	Hédi Dorozsmai / Etelka Karalyos; Agathe Cuevas / Elsa Jacob	12; 21	9; 21
4	(Hungary) (France)	Balázs Csernyánszky / Péter Palkovics; Thibault Gardon / Tom Lalot Trescarte	13; 21	6; 21
5	(Hungary) (France)	Csanád Horváth / Petra Hart; Ewan Goulin / Agathe Cuevas	17; 21	10; 21

=== Group 2 ===
Pos	Team	Pld	W	L	MF	MA	MD	GF	GA	GD	PF	PA	PD	Pts	Qualification	Denmark	Slovenia	Cyprus
1	Denmark	2	2	0	10	0	+10	20	0	+20	423	242	+181	2	Advance to knockout stage	—	5–0	5–0
2	Slovenia	2	1	1	4	6	−2	8	13	−5	347	381	−34	1			—	4–1
3	Cyprus	2	0	2	1	9	−8	3	18	−15	279	426	−147	0				—

Source: TS

==== Cyprus vs Denmark ====
Cyprus
0
Poliesportiu Sa Blanca Dona, Court 2
26 November 2024, 09:30 UTC+1

Denmark
5

			1	2	3
1	(Cyprus) (Denmark)	Nikolas Kokosis; Philip Kryger Boe	17; 21	13; 21
2	(Cyprus) (Denmark)	Sofia Ioannou; Caroline Mouritsen	8; 21	13; 21
3	(Cyprus) (Denmark)	Konstantinos Giannopoulos / Ioannis Tambourlas; Robert Nebel / Otto Reiler	13; 21	13; 21
4	(Cyprus) (Denmark)	Varvara Architektonidou / Efi Zanou; Amanda Aarrebo Petersen / Maria Højlund Tommerup	7; 21	3; 21
5	(Cyprus) (Denmark)	Ioannis Tambourlas / Eleni Charalambous; Robert Nebel / Anna-Sofie Nielsen	13; 21	11; 21

==== Slovenia vs Cyprus ====
Slovenia
4
Poliesportiu Sa Blanca Dona, Court 2
27 November 2024, 17:30 UTC+1

Cyprus
1

			1	2	3
1	(Slovenia) (Cyprus)	Tadej Jelenc / Ariana Korent; Ioannis Tambourlas / Efi Zanou	21; 7	21; 17
2	(Slovenia) (Cyprus)	Nikita Peshekhonov; Nikolas Kokosis	17; 21	13; 21
3	(Slovenia) (Cyprus)	Anja Blazina; Sofia Ioannou	21; 14	21; 9
4	(Slovenia) (Cyprus)	Tadej Jelenc / Nikita Peshekhonov; Konstantinos Giannopoulos / Ioannis Tambourlas	21; 18	18; 21	21; 16
5	(Slovenia) (Cyprus)	Anja Blazina / Ariana Korent; Eleni Charalambous / Sofia Ioannou	21; 11	21; 13

==== Slovenia vs Denmark ====
Slovenia
0
Poliesportiu Sa Blanca Dona, Court 4
28 November 2024, 13:30 UTC+1

Denmark
5

			1	2	3
1	(Slovenia) (Denmark)	Tadej Jelenc; Salomon Adam Thomasen	14; 21	22; 24
2	(Slovenia) (Denmark)	Anja Blazina; Kajsa van Dalm	18; 21	16; 21
3	(Slovenia) (Denmark)	Tadej Jelenc / Nikita Peshekhonov; Philip Kryger Boe / Jesper Østergaard Christensen	13; 21	12; 21
4	(Slovenia) (Denmark)	Anja Blazina / Ariana Korent; Anna-Sofie Nielsen / Maria Højlund Tommerup	12; 21	5; 21
5	(Slovenia) (Denmark)	Tim Bregar / Tija Horvat; Otto Reiler / Amanda Aarrebo Petersen	6; 21	13; 21

=== Group 3 ===
Pos	Team	Pld	W	L	MF	MA	MD	GF	GA	GD	PF	PA	PD	Pts	Qualification	Poland	Bulgaria	Slovakia	Latvia
1	Poland	3	3	0	12	3	+9	25	7	+18	626	396	+230	3	Advance to knockout stage	—	3–2	4–1	5–0
2	Bulgaria	3	2	1	9	6	+3	20	12	+8	562	495	+67	2			—	3–2	4–1
3	Slovakia	3	1	2	7	8	−1	16	18	−2	583	597	−14	1				—	4–1
4	Latvia	3	0	3	2	13	−11	4	28	−24	366	649	−283	0					—

Source: TS

==== Poland vs Latvia ====
Poland
5
Poliesportiu Sa Blanca Dona, Court 3
26 November 2024, 13:30 UTC+1

Latvia
0

			1	2	3
1	(Poland) (Latvia)	Mikołaj Morawski / Maja Janko; Toms Sala / Nikola Mukiele	21; 13	21; 11
2	(Poland) (Latvia)	Mateusz Golas; Leonardo Golovčenko	21; 4	21; 4
3	(Poland) (Latvia)	Kaja Ziółkowska; Katrina Svalbe	21; 2	21; 4
4	(Poland) (Latvia)	Pawel Kiszczyk / Damian Perkowski; Toms Sala / Andrejs Vilnis	21; 16	21; 4
5	(Poland) (Latvia)	Maja Janko / Kinga Stokfisz; Evelīna Freija / Nikola Mukiele	21; 6	21; 10

==== Slovakia vs Bulgaria ====
Slovakia
2
Poliesportiu Sa Blanca Dona, Court 4
26 November 2024, 13:30 UTC+1

Bulgaria
3

			1	2	3
1	(Slovakia) (Bulgaria)	Andrej Suchý / Johanka Ivanovičová; Nikolay Kolev / Desislava Karkadakova	21; 12	21; 8
2	(Slovakia) (Bulgaria)	Alex Petrovic; Tsvetan Ivanov	17; 21	16; 21
3	(Slovakia) (Bulgaria)	Lea Kyselicová; Kaloyana Nalbantova	7; 21	3; 21
4	(Slovakia) (Bulgaria)	Matúš Poláček / Andrej Suchý; Tsvetan Ivanov / Teodor Mitev	22; 20	20; 22	21; 18
5	(Slovakia) (Bulgaria)	Karin Goldiánová / Johanka Ivanovičová; Kaloyana Nalbantova / Raia Pashova	13; 21	17; 21

==== Poland vs Slovakia ====
Poland
4
Poliesportiu Sa Blanca Dona, Court 1
27 November 2024, 09:30 UTC+1

Slovakia
1

			1	2	3
1	(Poland) (Slovakia)	Krzysztof Podkowiński / Kinga Stokfisz; Andrej Suchý / Johanka Ivanovičová	21; 12	21; 17
2	(Poland) (Slovakia)	Bartosz Punko; Matúš Poláček	21; 7	21; 13
3	(Poland) (Slovakia)	Alicja Syrek; Lea Kyselicová	21; 9	21; 17
4	(Poland) (Slovakia)	Mikołaj Morawski / Krzysztof Podkowiński; Matúš Poláček / Andrej Suchý	22; 20	19; 21	18; 21
5	(Poland) (Slovakia)	Maja Janko / Kinga Stokfisz; Karin Goldiánová / Johanka Ivanovičová	21; 11	19; 21	21; 15

==== Bulgaria vs Latvia ====
Bulgaria
4
Poliesportiu Sa Blanca Dona, Court 2
27 November 2024, 09:30 UTC+1

Latvia
1

			1	2	3
1	(Bulgaria) (Latvia)	Tsvetan Ivanov / Raia Pashova; Leonardo Golovčenko / Evelīna Freija	21; 10	21; 11
2	(Bulgaria) (Latvia)	Teodor Mitev; Toms Sala	21; 13	12; 21	17; 21
3	(Bulgaria) (Latvia)	Kaloyana Nalbantova; Katrina Svalbe	21; 12	21; 5
4	(Bulgaria) (Latvia)	Tsvetan Ivanov / Teodor Mitev; Toms Sala / Andrejs Vilnis	21; 15	21; 16
5	(Bulgaria) (Latvia)	Desislava Karkadakova / Raia Pashova; Evelīna Freija / Nikola Mukiele	21; 8	21; 15

==== Slovakia vs Latvia ====
Slovakia
4
Poliesportiu Sa Blanca Dona, Court 1
28 November 2024, 17:30 UTC+1

Latvia
1

			1	2	3
1	(Slovakia) (Latvia)	Johanka Ivanovičová; Katrina Svalbe	21; 1	21; 12
2	(Slovakia) (Latvia)	Matúš Poláček; Toms Sala	21; 16	18; 21	13; 21
3	(Slovakia) (Latvia)	Karin Goldiánová / Johanka Ivanovičová; Evelīna Freija / Nikola Mukiele	21; 9	21; 8
4	(Slovakia) (Latvia)	Matúš Poláček / Andrej Suchý; Leonardo Golovčenko / Andrejs Vilnis	21; 13	21; 12
5	(Slovakia) (Latvia)	Alex Petrovic / Lea Kyselicová; Toms Sala / Nikola Mukiele	22; 20	21; 12

==== Poland vs Bulgaria ====
Poland
3
Poliesportiu Sa Blanca Dona, Court 2
28 November 2024, 17:30 UTC+1

Bulgaria
2

			1	2	3
1	(Poland) (Bulgaria)	Krzysztof Podkowiński / Kinga Stokfisz; Nikolay Kolev / Desislava Karkadakova	21; 8	21; 8
2	(Poland) (Bulgaria)	Mateusz Golas; Tsvetan Ivanov	21; 10	21; 3
3	(Poland) (Bulgaria)	Alicja Syrek; Kaloyana Nalbantova	8; 21	11; 21
4	(Poland) (Bulgaria)	Mikołaj Morawski / Krzysztof Podkowiński; Tsvetan Ivanov / Teodor Mitev	21; 15	21; 10
5	(Poland) (Bulgaria)	Maja Janko / Kinga Stokfisz; Kaloyana Nalbantova / Raia Pashova	15; 21	10; 21

=== Group 4 ===
Pos	Team	Pld	W	L	MF	MA	MD	GF	GA	GD	PF	PA	PD	Pts	Qualification	Romania	Ukraine	Italy	Finland
1	Romania	3	2	1	8	7	+1	18	16	+2	591	593	−2	2	Advance to knockout stage	—	3–2	4–1	1–4
2	Ukraine	3	2	1	9	6	+3	20	14	+6	634	534	+100	2			—	3–2	4–1
3	Italy	3	1	2	7	8	−1	15	17	−2	523	593	−70	1				—	4–1
4	Finland	3	1	2	6	9	−3	13	19	−6	547	575	−28	1					—

Source: TS

==== Ukraine vs Finland ====
Ukraine
4
Poliesportiu Sa Blanca Dona, Court 1
26 November 2024, 13:30 UTC+1

Finland
1

			1	2	3
1	(Ukraine) (Finland)	Serhii Marushchak / Anastasiia Alymova; Alvar Melleri / Nella Nyqvist	16	21; 21	21; 13
2	(Ukraine) (Finland)	Ivan Tsarehorodtsev; Oliver Oldorff	21; 11	21; 6
3	(Ukraine) (Finland)	Maria Koriagina; Nella Nyqvist	21	17; 13	17; 21
4	(Ukraine) (Finland)	Yegor Romaniuk / Ivan Tsarehorodtsev; Akseli Aalto / Alvar Melleri	21; 17	21; 15
5	(Ukraine) (Finland)	Raiia Almalalha / Anastasiia Alymova; Sai Abhijna Brahmakal / Emma Lybeck	21; 5	21; 13

==== Romania vs Italy ====
Romania
4
Poliesportiu Sa Blanca Dona, Court 2
26 November 2024, 13:30 UTC+1

Italy
1

			1	2	3
1	(Romania) (Italy)	Denisa-Maria Muscalu; Anna Hell	21; 11	21; 11
2	(Romania) (Italy)	Luca-Stefan Pandele; Simone Piccinin	21; 16	22; 20
3	(Romania) (Italy)	Laura Constantin / Andra Stoica; Sofia Galimberti / Anna Hell	21; 12	21; 14
4	(Romania) (Italy)	George-Alexandru Mocan / Dragos-Gabriel Nita; Marco Danti / Simone Piccinin	16; 21	21; 19	8; 21
5	(Romania) (Italy)	Luca-Stefan Pandele / Denisa-Maria Muscalu; Ruben Fellin / Sofia Galimberti	21; 14	19; 21	21; 6

==== Ukraine vs Romania ====
Ukraine
2
Poliesportiu Sa Blanca Dona, Court 3
27 November 2024, 09:30 UTC+1

Romania
3

			1	2	3
1	(Ukraine) (Romania)	Ivan Tsarehorodtsev; Luca-Stefan Pandele	21	12; 12	18; 21
2	(Ukraine) (Romania)	Anastasiia Alymova; Denisa-Maria Muscalu	20	21; 22	21; 16
3	(Ukraine) (Romania)	Oleksandr Chyrun / Anton Druzhchenko; Vlad Dehelean / Matei-Daniel Puiu	21; 8	21; 9
4	(Ukraine) (Romania)	Raiia Almalalha / Anastasiia Alymova; Laura Constantin / Andra Stoica	12; 21	14; 21
5	(Ukraine) (Romania)	Vladyslav Kunin / Yaroslava Vantsarovska; Luca-Stefan Pandele / Denisa-Maria Muscalu	9; 21	14; 21

==== Italy vs Finland ====
Italy
4
Poliesportiu Sa Blanca Dona, Court 4
27 November 2024, 09:30 UTC+1

Finland
1

			1	2	3
1	(Italy) (Finland)	Anna Hell; Nella Nyqvist	7; 21	8; 21
2	(Italy) (Finland)	Simone Piccinin; Oliver Oldorff	21; 15	21; 17
3	(Italy) (Finland)	Sofia Galimberti / Anna Hell; Sai Abhijna Brahmakal / Emma Lybeck	21; 16	22; 20
4	(Italy) (Finland)	Marco Danti / Simone Piccinin; Akseli Aalto / Alvar Melleri	21; 13	21; 16
5	(Italy) (Finland)	Ruben Fellin / Sofia Galimberti; Elmeri Lybeck / Emma Lybeck	21; 13	21; 17

==== Romania vs Finland ====
Romania
1
Poliesportiu Sa Blanca Dona, Court 3
28 November 2024, 17:30 UTC+1

Finland
4

			1	2	3
1	(Romania) (Finland)	George-Alexandru Mocan; Alvar Melleri	13; 21	16; 21
2	(Romania) (Finland)	Andra Stoica; Nella Nyqvist	8; 21	12; 21
3	(Romania) (Finland)	Vlad Dehelean / Matei-Daniel Puiu; Akseli Aalto / Elmeri Lybeck	16; 21	17; 21
4	(Romania) (Finland)	Daria-Irina Gherasim / Cristina-Maria Sîrbu; Sai Abhijna Brahmakal / Emma Lybeck	22; 20	21; 15
5	(Romania) (Finland)	Dragos-Gabriel Nita / Andra Stoica; Alvar Melleri / Nella Nyqvist	11; 21	16; 21

==== Ukraine vs Italy ====
Ukraine
3
Poliesportiu Sa Blanca Dona, Court 4
28 November 2024, 17:30 UTC+1

Italy
2

			1	2	3
1	(Ukraine) (Italy)	Raiia Almalalha; Anna Hell	21; 11	21; 9
2	(Ukraine) (Italy)	Ivan Tsarehorodtsev; Marco Danti	16; 21	15; 21
3	(Ukraine) (Italy)	Maria Koriagina / Yaroslava Vantsarovska; Sofia Galimberti / Anna Hell	21; 8	21; 10
4	(Ukraine) (Italy)	Danil Siedov / Vladyslav Stepanchenko; Marco Danti / Ruben Fellin	24; 26	10; 21
5	(Ukraine) (Italy)	Vladyslav Kunin / Yaroslava Vantsarovska; Davide Izzo / Carolin Rauner	21; 12	21; 14

=== Group 5 ===
Pos	Team	Pld	W	L	MF	MA	MD	GF	GA	GD	PF	PA	PD	Pts	Qualification	Germany	Belgium	Ireland	Portugal
1	Germany	3	3	0	12	3	+9	25	11	+14	711	578	+133	3	Advance to knockout stage	—	3–2	5–0	4–1
2	Belgium	3	2	1	8	7	+1	21	17	+4	710	681	+29	2			—	3–2	3–2
3	Ireland	3	1	2	5	10	−5	13	23	−10	590	679	−89	1				—	3–2
4	Portugal	3	0	3	5	10	−5	14	22	−8	593	666	−73	0					—

Source: TS

==== Germany vs Belgium ====
Germany
3
Poliesportiu Sa Blanca Dona, Court 1
26 November 2024, 17:30 UTC+1

Belgium
2

			1	2	3
1	(Germany) (Belgium)	Danial Marzuan / Shreya Hochscheid; Roel Pipeleers / Lieke van Parys	21; 23	21; 12	21; 16
2	(Germany) (Belgium)	Luis Pongratz; Arnaud Huberty	21; 12	21; 15
3	(Germany) (Belgium)	Gloria Poluektov; Noa Dauphinais	16; 21	14; 21
4	(Germany) (Belgium)	Danial Marzuan / Mark Niemann; Matts Croes / Roel Pipeleers	16; 21	21; 14	21; 14
5	(Germany) (Belgium)	Shreya Hochscheid / Marie Sophie Stern; Lieke van Parys / Tammi van Wonterghem	23; 25	21; 16	18; 21

==== Ireland vs Portugal ====
Ireland
3
Poliesportiu Sa Blanca Dona, Court 2
26 November 2024, 17:30 UTC+1

Portugal
2

			1	2	3
1	(Republic of Ireland) (Portugal)	Michelle Shochan; Maria Wilkinson	21; 12	21; 7
2	(Republic of Ireland) (Portugal)	Pranav Erukatil; Tiago Berenguer	10; 21	8; 21
3	(Republic of Ireland) (Portugal)	Siofra Flynn / Roisin McKenna; Mafalda Avelino / Maria Wilkinson	21; 12	21; 11
4	(Republic of Ireland) (Portugal)	Karl McLoughlin / Dylan Noble; Santiago Batalha / Dinis Maia	15; 21	21; 17	9; 21
5	(Republic of Ireland) (Portugal)	Senan O'Rourke / Paige Woods; Alexandre Bernardo / Isabella Wilkinson	19; 21	23; 21	21; 15

==== Germany vs Ireland ====
Germany
5
Poliesportiu Sa Blanca Dona, Court 3
27 November 2024, 13:30 UTC+1

Ireland
0

			1	2	3
1	(Germany) (Republic of Ireland)	Danial Marzuan / Shreya Hochscheid; Karl McLoughlin / Roisin McKenna	21; 8	21; 14
2	(Germany) (Republic of Ireland)	Luis Pongratz; Dylan Noble	21; 11	21; 15
3	(Germany) (Republic of Ireland)	Gloria Poluektov; Siofra Flynn	21; 14	19; 21	21; 18
4	(Germany) (Republic of Ireland)	Danial Marzuan / Mark Niemann; Pranav Erukatil / Senan O'Rourke	21; 12	21; 9
5	(Germany) (Republic of Ireland)	Shreya Hochscheid / Marie Sophie Stern; Michelle Shochan / Paige Woods	21; 11	21; 17

==== Portugal vs Belgium ====
Portugal
2
Poliesportiu Sa Blanca Dona, Court 4
27 November 2024, 13:30 UTC+1

Belgium
3

			1	2	3
1	(Portugal) (Belgium)	Alexandre Bernardo / Isabella Wilkinson; Matts Croes / Tammi van Wonterghem	24; 22	10; 21	11; 21
2	(Portugal) (Belgium)	Tiago Berenguer; Raphael Maho	21; 12	21; 15
3	(Portugal) (Belgium)	Mafalda Avelino; Noa Dauphinais	15; 21	19; 21
4	(Portugal) (Belgium)	Santiago Batalha / Dinis Maia; Matts Croes / Roel Pipeleers	15; 21	21; 18	21; 15
5	(Portugal) (Belgium)	Isabella Wilkinson / Maria Wilkinson; Lieke van Parys / Tammi van Wonterghem	12; 21	6; 21

==== Ireland vs Belgium ====
Ireland
2
Poliesportiu Sa Blanca Dona, Court 5
28 November 2024, 09:30 UTC+1

Belgium
3

			1	2	3
1	(Republic of Ireland) (Belgium)	Pranav Erukatil / Michelle Shochan; Roel Pipeleers / Tammi van Wonterghem	19; 21	21; 17	21; 19
2	(Republic of Ireland) (Belgium)	Dylan Noble; Arnaud Huberty	21; 15	17; 21	4; 21
3	(Republic of Ireland) (Belgium)	Siofra Flynn; Noa Dauphinais	19; 21	22; 20	21; 11
4	(Republic of Ireland) (Belgium)	Karl McLoughlin / Senan O'Rourke; Matts Croes / Roel Pipeleers	15; 21	15; 21
5	(Republic of Ireland) (Belgium)	Roisin McKenna / Paige Woods; Lieke Van Parys / Tammi van Wonterghem	19; 21	16; 21

==== Germany vs Portugal ====
Germany
4
Poliesportiu Sa Blanca Dona, Court 6
28 November 2024, 09:30 UTC+1

Portugal
1

			1	2	3
1	(Germany) (Portugal)	Katharina Nilges; Mafalda Avelino	21; 14	21; 11
2	(Germany) (Portugal)	Mats Wohlers; Tiago Berenguer	12; 21	17; 21
3	(Germany) (Portugal)	Leonie Wronna / Aurelia Wulandoko; Mafalda Avelino / Maria Wilkinson	21; 12	21; 19
4	(Germany) (Portugal)	Linus Emmerich / Jonas Schmid; Santiago Batalha / Dinis Maia	19; 21	21; 13	21; 17
5	(Germany) (Portugal)	Alexander Philipp Zhang / Aurelia Wulandoko; Alexandre Bernardo / Maria Wilkinson	21; 19	11; 21	21; 8

=== Group 6 ===
Pos	Team	Pld	W	L	MF	MA	MD	GF	GA	GD	PF	PA	PD	Pts	Qualification	Netherlands	England	Spain	Austria
1	Netherlands	3	3	0	10	5	+5	21	15	+6	680	621	+59	3	Advance to knockout stage	—	3–2	3–2	4–1
2	England	3	2	1	9	6	+3	20	14	+6	618	555	+63	2			—	3–2	4–1
3	Spain (H)	3	1	2	9	6	+3	20	13	+7	624	569	+55	1				—	5–0
4	Austria	3	0	3	2	13	−11	7	26	−19	495	672	−177	0					—

Source: TS
(H) Host

==== Spain vs Austria ====
Spain
5
Poliesportiu Sa Blanca Dona, Court 5
26 November 2024, 09:30 UTC+1

Austria
0

			1	2	3
1	(Spain) (Austria)	Adolfo López / Carmen María Jiménez; Pascal Cheng / Sarah Dlapka	21; 17	21; 11
2	(Spain) (Austria)	Ana Novoa; Anja Rumpold	26; 24	21; 15
3	(Spain) (Austria)	Mario Rodríguez; Pascal Cheng	13; 21	21; 15	24; 22
4	(Spain) (Austria)	Macarena Izquierdo / Carmen María Jiménez; Hanna Gillesberger / Anja Rumpold	21; 18	21; 16
5	(Spain) (Austria)	Adolfo López / Ramon Rovira; Lorenz Windauer / Shangzu Zhan	21; 12	21; 9

==== England vs Netherlands ====
England
2
Poliesportiu Sa Blanca Dona, Court 6
26 November 2024, 09:30 UTC+1

Netherlands
3

			1	2	3
1	(England) (Netherlands)	Jia Bin Lee / Lucy Dodd; Casper Spaans / Inger Pothuizen	14; 21	21; 12	21; 10
2	(England) (Netherlands)	James Song; Dion Hoegen	21; 19	21; 12
3	(England) (Netherlands)	Rajvi Parab; Flora Wang	18; 21	21; 15	14; 21
4	(England) (Netherlands)	Benjamin Horseman / Jia Bin Lee; Casper Spaans / Joep Strooper	13; 21	20; 22
5	(England) (Netherlands)	Lucy Dodd / Lila Dundas; Sterre Bang / Inger Pothuizen	12; 21	21; 16	19; 21

==== Spain vs England ====
Spain
2
Poliesportiu Sa Blanca Dona, Court 5
27 November 2024, 09:30 UTC+1

England
3

			1	2	3
1	(Spain) (England)	Adolfo López / Carmen María Jiménez; Jia Bin Lee / Lucy Dodd	21; 11	21; 12
2	(Spain) (England)	Yaidel Gil; James Song	8; 21	17; 21
3	(Spain) (England)	Iziar Barcala; Rajvi Parab	14; 21	15; 21
4	(Spain) (England)	Adolfo López / Ramon Rovira; Benjamin Horseman / Jia Bin Lee	15; 21	19; 21
5	(Spain) (England)	Macarena Izquierdo / Carmen María Jiménez; Lila Dundas / Matilda Franklin	21; 12	21; 8

==== Netherlands vs Austria ====
Netherlands
4
Poliesportiu Sa Blanca Dona, Court 6
27 November 2024, 09:30 UTC+1

Austria
1

			1	2	3
1	(Netherlands) (Austria)	Joep Strooper / Sterre Bang; Pascal Cheng / Hanna Gillesberger	24; 22	21; 8
2	(Netherlands) (Austria)	Flora Wang; Natalia Galova	21; 14	21; 10
3	(Netherlands) (Austria)	Mats Duwel; Pascal Cheng	21; 15	19; 21	21; 14
4	(Netherlands) (Austria)	Sterre Bang / Inger Pothuizen; Sarah Dlapka / Anja Rumpold	17; 21	21; 23
5	(Netherlands) (Austria)	Casper Spaans / Joep Strooper; Lorenz Windauer / Shangzu Zhan	21; 11	21; 5

==== Spain vs Netherlands ====
Spain
2
Poliesportiu Sa Blanca Dona, Court 1
28 November 2024, 09:30 UTC+1

Netherlands
3

			1	2	3
1	(Spain) (Netherlands)	Adolfo López / Carmen María Jiménez; Joep Strooper / Sterre Bang	21; 16	21; 19
2	(Spain) (Netherlands)	Ramon Rovira; Mats Duwel	20; 22	21; 12	18; 21
3	(Spain) (Netherlands)	Ana Novoa; Flora Wang	10; 21	11; 21
4	(Spain) (Netherlands)	Jesús de Burgos / Adolfo López; Casper Spaans / Joep Strooper	21; 17	16; 21	20; 22
5	(Spain) (Netherlands)	Macarena Izquierdo / Carmen María Jiménez; Sterre Bang / Inger Pothuizen	21; 13	21; 15

==== England vs Austria ====
England
4
Poliesportiu Sa Blanca Dona, Court 2
28 November 2024, 09:30 UTC+1

Austria
1

			1	2	3
1	(England) (Austria)	Jia Bin Lee / Lucy Dodd; Lorenz Windauer / Hanna Gillesberger	19; 21	16; 21
2	(England) (Austria)	James Song; Pascal Cheng	21; 12	21; 11
3	(England) (Austria)	Rajvi Parab; Natalia Galova	21; 7	21; 8
4	(England) (Austria)	Benjamin Horseman / Jia Bin Lee; Lorenz Windauer / Shangzu Zhan	21; 10	21; 8
5	(England) (Austria)	Sofie Chong / Lucy Dodd; Sarah Dlapka / Anja Rumpold	10; 21	21; 19	21; 13

=== Group 7 ===
Pos	Team	Pld	W	L	MF	MA	MD	GF	GA	GD	PF	PA	PD	Pts	Qualification	Switzerland	Czech Republic	Israel	Croatia
1	Switzerland	3	3	0	14	1	+13	28	6	+22	675	485	+190	3	Advance to knockout stage	—	4–1	5–0	5–0
2	Czech Republic	3	2	1	10	5	+5	24	12	+12	669	585	+84	2			—	5–0	4–1
3	Israel	3	1	2	4	11	−7	10	23	−13	523	669	−146	1				—	4–1
4	Croatia	3	0	3	2	13	−11	7	28	−21	564	692	−128	0					—

Source: TS

==== Czech Republic vs Israel ====
Czech Republic
5
Poliesportiu Sa Blanca Dona, Court 3
26 November 2024, 09:30 UTC+1

Israel
0

			1	2	3
1	(Czech Republic) (Israel)	Patrik Hrazdíra / Kateřina Osladilová; Shon Leitman / Zohar Amoyal	21; 17	21; 11
2	(Czech Republic) (Israel)	Lukáš Thor; Guy Nachlieli	21; 13	21; 12
3	(Czech Republic) (Israel)	Lucie Krulová; Alina Bergelson	23; 21	22; 24	21; 19
4	(Czech Republic) (Israel)	Vojtěch Havlíček / Patrik Hrazdíra; Sharon Perelshtein / Adam Travinskiy	21; 10	21; 14
5	(Czech Republic) (Israel)	Kateřina Koliášová / Kateřina Osladilová; Zohar Amoyal / Alina Bergelson	21; 17	21; 11

==== Croatia vs Switzerland ====
Croatia
0
Poliesportiu Sa Blanca Dona, Court 4
26 November 2024, 09:30 UTC+1

Switzerland
5

			1	2	3
1	(Croatia) (Switzerland)	Hrvoje Mavriček / Ana Pranić; Hugo Chanthakesone / Jorina Jann	8; 21	15; 21
2	(Croatia) (Switzerland)	Roko Pipunić; Keishin Rimmer	13; 21	17; 21
3	(Croatia) (Switzerland)	Jelena Buchberger; Leila Zarrouk	15; 21	21; 18	17; 21
4	(Croatia) (Switzerland)	Hrvoje Mavriček / Roko Pipunić; Hugo Chanthakesone / Liano Panza	14; 21	12; 21
5	(Croatia) (Switzerland)	Jelena Buchberger / Ana Pranić; Jorina Jann / Leila Zarrouk	9; 21	19; 21

==== Czech Republic vs Croatia ====
Czech Republic
4
Poliesportiu Sa Blanca Dona, Court 3
27 November 2024, 17:30 UTC+1

Croatia
1

			1	2	3
1	(Czech Republic) (Croatia)	Vojtěch Havlíček / Kateřina Koliášová; Roko Pipunić / Jelena Buchberger	17; 21	21; 18	21; 16
2	(Czech Republic) (Croatia)	Lukáš Patzák; Hrvoje Mavriček	21; 9	21; 9
3	(Czech Republic) (Croatia)	Lucie Krulová; Ana Pranić	21; 11	21; 5
4	(Czech Republic) (Croatia)	Vojtěch Havlíček / Patrik Hrazdíra; Hrvoje Mavriček / Roko Pipunić	21; 10	21; 17
5	(Czech Republic) (Croatia)	Karolína Kalkušová / Ivana Treperová; Jelena Buchberger / Ana Pranić	23; 21	10; 21	14; 21

==== Switzerland vs Israel ====
Switzerland
5
Poliesportiu Sa Blanca Dona, Court 4
27 November 2024, 17:30 UTC+1

Israel
0

			1	2	3
1	(Switzerland) (Israel)	Liano Panza / Anic Metzger; Adam Travinskiy / Alina Bergelson	21; 13	21; 10
2	(Switzerland) (Israel)	Arnaud Boschung; Sharon Perelshtein	21; 10	21; 13
3	(Switzerland) (Israel)	Sanna Germann; Zohar Amoyal	21; 10	21; 13
4	(Switzerland) (Israel)	Hugo Chanthakesone / Liano Panza; Sharon Perelshtein / Adam Travinskiy	21; 13	21; 16
5	(Switzerland) (Israel)	Jorina Jann / Leila Zarrouk; Zohar Amoyal / Alina Bergelson	21; 15	21; 9

==== Czech Republic vs Switzerland ====
Czech Republic
1
Poliesportiu Sa Blanca Dona, Court 1
28 November 2024, 13:30 UTC+1

Switzerland
4

			1	2	3
1	(Czech Republic) (Switzerland)	Patrik Hrazdíra / Kateřina Osladilová; Hugo Chanthakesone / Jorina Jann	21; 15	21; 8
2	(Czech Republic) (Switzerland)	Lukáš Patzák; Keishin Rimmer	13; 21	11; 21
3	(Czech Republic) (Switzerland)	Lucie Krulová; Leila Zarrouk	22; 20	15; 21	13; 21
4	(Czech Republic) (Switzerland)	Vojtěch Havlíček / Patrik Hrazdíra; Hugo Chanthakesone / Liano Panza	16; 21	21; 11	17; 21
5	(Czech Republic) (Switzerland)	Kateřina Koliášová / Kateřina Osladilová; Jorina Jann / Leila Zarrouk	7; 21	21; 15	5; 21

==== Croatia vs Israel ====
Croatia
1
Poliesportiu Sa Blanca Dona, Court 2
28 November 2024, 13:30 UTC+1

Israel
4

			1	2	3
1	(Croatia) (Israel)	Hrvoje Mavriček / Jelena Buchberger; Adam Travinskiy / Zohar Amoyal	18; 21	21; 15	16; 21
2	(Croatia) (Israel)	Roko Pipunić; Sharon Perelshtein	19; 21	19; 21
3	(Croatia) (Israel)	Ana Pranić; Alina Bergelson	11; 21	19; 21
4	(Croatia) (Israel)	Hrvoje Mavriček / Roko Pipunić; Sharon Perelshtein / Adam Travinskiy	25; 27	16; 21
5	(Croatia) (Israel)	Jelena Buchberger / Ana Pranić; Zohar Amoyal / Alina Bergelson	21; 11	19; 21	21; 11

=== Group 8 ===
Pos	Team	Pld	W	L	MF	MA	MD	GF	GA	GD	PF	PA	PD	Pts	Qualification	Turkey	Estonia	Scotland	Norway
1	Turkey	3	3	0	14	1	+13	29	4	+25	678	469	+209	3	Advance to knockout stage	—	5–0	4–1	5–0
2	Estonia	3	2	1	7	8	−1	18	19	−1	664	654	+10	2			—	3–2	4–1
3	Scotland	3	1	2	6	9	−3	15	20	−5	604	626	−22	1				—	3–2
4	Norway	3	0	3	3	12	−9	8	27	−19	505	702	−197	0					—

Source: TS

==== Turkey vs Norway ====
Turkey
5
Poliesportiu Sa Blanca Dona, Court 3
26 November 2024, 17:30 UTC+1

Norway
0

			1	2	3
1	(Turkey) (Norway)	Mehmet Can Töremiş; Mathias Wong	21; 6	21; 9
2	(Turkey) (Norway)	Ravza Bodur; Linnea Holmedal	21; 10	21; 12
3	(Turkey) (Norway)	Berat Cambaz / Mert Seven; Brynjar Hus / Jakob Langeland Risa	21; 19	21; 11
4	(Turkey) (Norway)	Sudenaz Acu / Beren Aşkar; Maria Ellingsen / Oline Langeland Risa	21; 10	21; 14
5	(Turkey) (Norway)	Buğra Aktaş / Sinem Yıldız; Jakob Langeland Risa / Mina Korssund	21; 6	21; 14

==== Scotland vs Estonia ====
Scotland
2
Poliesportiu Sa Blanca Dona, Court 4
26 November 2024, 17:30 UTC+1

Estonia
3

			1	2	3
1	(Scotland) (Estonia)	Lewis Coghill / Brooke Stalker; Rasmus Talts / Lumikki Liias	19; 21	22; 20	14; 21
2	(Scotland) (Estonia)	Matthew Waring; Andrei Schmidt	15; 21	21; 11	21; 10
3	(Scotland) (Estonia)	Katrina Chan; Marija Paskotši	9; 21	12; 21
4	(Scotland) (Estonia)	Lewis Coghill / Alfie Martin; Rasmus Roogsoo / Rasmus Talts	13; 21	13; 21
5	(Scotland) (Estonia)	Ishbel McCallister / Brooke Stalker; Lumikki Liias / Romili Vakk	21; 17	21; 12

==== Turkey vs Scotland ====
Turkey
4
Poliesportiu Sa Blanca Dona, Court 1
27 November 2024, 13:30 UTC+1

Scotland
1

			1	2	3
1	(Turkey) (Scotland)	Arda Doğaç Atan; Matthew Waring	13; 21	21; 19	12; 21
2	(Turkey) (Scotland)	Aleyna Korkut; Vibha Raman	21; 13	21; 10
3	(Turkey) (Scotland)	Buğra Aktaş / Mehmet Can Töremiş; Lewis Coghill / Lewis Smith	21; 14	21; 8
4	(Turkey) (Scotland)	Aysu Arslan / Defne Ilgın Koçak; Ishbel McCallister / Brooke Stalker	22; 20	21; 13
5	(Turkey) (Scotland)	Buğra Aktaş / Sinem Yıldız; Alfie Martin / Katrina Chan	21; 9	21; 12

==== Estonia vs Norway ====
Estonia
4
Poliesportiu Sa Blanca Dona, Court 2
27 November 2024, 13:30 UTC+1

Norway
1

			1	2	3
1	(Estonia) (Norway)	Marti Joost; Aleksander Jakovlevs	11; 21	21; 14	15; 21
2	(Estonia) (Norway)	Marija Paskotši; Maria Ellingsen	21; 8	21; 10
3	(Estonia) (Norway)	Rasmus Roogsoo / Rasmus Talts; Aleksander Jakovlevs / Mathias Wong	21; 10	19; 21	21; 18
4	(Estonia) (Norway)	Kaisa Liis Lepp / Romili Vakk; Linnea Holmedal / Mina Korssund	15; 21	21; 16	21; 13
5	(Estonia) (Norway)	Andrei Schmidt / Lumikki Liias; Brynjar Hus / Oline Langeland Risa	21; 10	21; 17

==== Scotland vs Norway ====
Scotland
3
Poliesportiu Sa Blanca Dona, Court 3
28 November 2024, 09:30 UTC+1

Norway
2

			1	2	3
1	(Scotland) (Norway)	Vibha Raman; Linnea Holmedal	21; 23	21; 15	13; 21
2	(Scotland) (Norway)	Matthew Waring; Mathias Wong	21; 13	21; 11
3	(Scotland) (Norway)	Ishbel McCallister / Brooke Stalker; Linnea Holmedal / Mina Korssund	21; 17	21; 6
4	(Scotland) (Norway)	Lewis Smith / Lingyun Xiao; Aleksander Jakovlevs / Mathias Wong	21; 16	23; 25	18; 21
5	(Scotland) (Norway)	Lewis Coghill / Brooke Stalker; Jakob Langeland Risa / Mina Korssund	21; 11	21; 15

==== Turkey vs Estonia ====
Turkey
5
Poliesportiu Sa Blanca Dona, Court 4
28 November 2024, 09:30 UTC+1

Estonia
0

			1	2	3
1	(Turkey) (Estonia)	Mehmet Can Töremiş; Andrei Schmidt	21; 13	20; 22	21; 12
2	(Turkey) (Estonia)	Ravza Bodur; Marija Paskotši	21; 18	21; 9
3	(Turkey) (Estonia)	Buğra Aktaş / Mehmet Can Töremiş; Rasmus Roogsoo / Rasmus Talts	21; 10	21; 18
4	(Turkey) (Estonia)	Sudenaz Acu / Beren Aşkar; Kaisa Liis Lepp / Romili Vakk	23; 21	21; 23	21; 18
5	(Turkey) (Estonia)	Gökay Göl / Nisa Nur Çimen; Andrei Schmidt / Lumikki Liias	21; 15	21; 19

== Knockout stage ==
=== Bracket ===
Quarter-finals
France	3
Switzerland	1
Poland	3
Germany	1
Netherlands	3
Romania	1
Turkey	1
Denmark	3

Semi-finals
France	3
Poland	2
Netherlands	1
Denmark	3

Final
France	2
Denmark	3

=== Quarter-finals ===
==== France vs Switzerland ====
France
3
Poliesportiu Sa Blanca Dona, Court 1
29 November 2024, 09:30 UTC+1

Switzerland
1

			1	2	3
1	(France) (Switzerland)	Tom Lalot Trescarte / Camille Pognante; Liano Panza / Anic Metzger	21; 19	21; 13
2	(France) (Switzerland)	Arthur Tatranov; Keishin Rimmer	11; 21	21; 12	21; 15
3	(France) (Switzerland)	Malya Hoareau; Leila Zarrouk	18; 21	21; 17	11; 21
4	(France) (Switzerland)	Thibault Gardon / Ewan Goulin; Hugo Chanthakesone / Liano Panza	21; 16	21; 12
5	(France) (Switzerland)	Elsa Jacob / Camille Pognante; Jorina Jann / Leila Zarrouk				not played

==== Poland vs Germany ====
Poland
3
Poliesportiu Sa Blanca Dona, Court 2
29 November 2024, 09:30 UTC+1

Germany
1

			1	2	3
1	(Poland) (Germany)	Krzysztof Podkowiński / Kinga Stokfisz; Danial Marzuan / Shreya Hochscheid	21; 19	21; 19
2	(Poland) (Germany)	Mateusz Golas; Luis Pongratz	21; 13	21; 17
3	(Poland) (Germany)	Kaja Ziółkowska; Gloria Poluektov	21; 17	21; 23	9; 21
4	(Poland) (Germany)	Mikołaj Morawski / Krzysztof Podkowiński; Danial Marzuan / Mark Niemann	21; 15	14; 21	21; 14
5	(Poland) (Germany)	Maja Janko / Kinga Stokfisz; Shreya Hochscheid / Marie Sophie Stern				not played

==== Netherlands vs Romania ====
Netherlands
3
Poliesportiu Sa Blanca Dona, Court 3
29 November 2024, 09:30 UTC+1

Romania
1

			1	2	3
1	(Netherlands) (Romania)	Mats Duwel; Luca-Stefan Pandele	8; 21	19; 21
2	(Netherlands) (Romania)	Flora Wang; Denisa-Maria Muscalu	21; 14	21; 10
3	(Netherlands) (Romania)	Casper Spaans / Joep Strooper; Vlad Dehelean / George-Alexandru Mocan	21; 15	21; 13
4	(Netherlands) (Romania)	Sterre Bang / Inger Pothuizen; Laura Constantin / Andra Stoica	21; 17	14; 21	26; 24
5	(Netherlands) (Romania)	Joep Strooper / Sterre Bang; Luca-Stefan Pandele / Denisa-Maria Muscalu				not played

==== Turkey vs Denmark ====
Turkey
1
Poliesportiu Sa Blanca Dona, Court 4
29 November 2024, 09:30 UTC+1

Denmark
3

			1	2	3
1	(Turkey) (Denmark)	Mehmet Can Töremiş; Salomon Adam Thomasen	21; 18	7; 21	21; 12
2	(Turkey) (Denmark)	Ravza Bodur; Kajsa van Dalm	11; 21	12; 21
3	(Turkey) (Denmark)	Buğra Aktaş / Mehmet Can Töremiş; Robert Nebel / Otto Reiler	21; 17	16; 21	15; 21
4	(Turkey) (Denmark)	Sudenaz Acu / Beren Aşkar; Amanda Aarrebo Petersen / Maria Højlund Tommerup	10; 21	11; 21
5	(Turkey) (Denmark)	Buğra Aktaş / Sinem Yıldız; Robert Nebel / Anna-Sofie Nielsen				not played

=== Semi-finals ===
==== France vs Poland ====
France
3
Poliesportiu Sa Blanca Dona, Court 1
29 November 2024, 13:30 UTC+1

Poland
2

			1	2	3
1	(France) (Poland)	Tom Lalot Trescarte / Elsa Jacob; Krzysztof Podkowiński / Kinga Stokfisz	21; 11	21; 23	18; 21
2	(France) (Poland)	Arthur Tatranov; Mateusz Golas	15; 21	15; 21
3	(France) (Poland)	Malya Hoareau; Alicja Syrek	21; 15	21; 14
4	(France) (Poland)	Thibault Gardon / Tom Lalot Trescarte; Mikołaj Morawski / Krzysztof Podkowiński	21; 23	21; 11	21; 14
5	(France) (Poland)	Elsa Jacob / Camille Pognante; Maja Janko / Kinga Stokfisz	21; 16	21; 9

==== Netherlands vs Denmark ====
Netherlands
1
Poliesportiu Sa Blanca Dona, Court 2
29 November 2024, 13:30 UTC+1

Denmark
3

			1	2	3
1	(Netherlands) (Denmark)	Joep Strooper / Sterre Bang; Otto Reiler / Amanda Aarrebo Petersen	18; 21	17; 21
2	(Netherlands) (Denmark)	Dion Hoegen; Philip Kryger Boe	10; 21	13; 21
3	(Netherlands) (Denmark)	Flora Wang; Kajsa van Dalm	21; 17	21; 15
4	(Netherlands) (Denmark)	Casper Spaans / Joep Strooper; Robert Nebel / Otto Reiler	15; 21	17; 21
5	(Netherlands) (Denmark)	Sterre Bang / Mandy Duijndam; Anna-Sofie Nielsen / Maria Højlund Tommerup				not played

=== Final ===
==== France vs Denmark ====
France
2
Poliesportiu Sa Blanca Dona, Court 1
30 November 2024, 09:00 UTC+1

Denmark
3

			1	2	3
1	(France) (Denmark)	Tom Lalot Trescarte / Elsa Jacob; Otto Reiler / Amanda Aarrebo Petersen	21; 9	21; 12
2	(France) (Denmark)	Arthur Tatranov; Salomon Adam Thomasen	21; 19	8; 21	12; 21
3	(France) (Denmark)	Malya Hoareau; Kajsa van Dalm	19; 21	21; 18	13; 21
4	(France) (Denmark)	Thibault Gardon / Tom Lalot Trescarte; Robert Nebel / Otto Reiler	21; 15	21; 18
5	(France) (Denmark)	Elsa Jacob / Camille Pognante; Anna-Sofie Nielsen / Maria Højlund Tommerup	21; 18	19; 21	14; 21
