= 2020 European Junior Badminton Championships – Teams event =

2020 European Junior Badminton Championships – Mixed team
- Venue: Pajulahti Sports Institute
- Location: Lahti, Finland
- Dates: 29 October 2020 – 2 November 2020
- Nations: 17

Medalists
gold medal	Denmark
silver medal	France
bronze medal	Estonia
bronze medal	Russia

The mixed team tournament of the 2020 European Junior Badminton Championships was held from 29 October to 2 November 2020.

== Tournament ==
=== Venue ===
This tournament was held at Pajulahti Sports Institute in Lahti, Finland.

=== Seeds ===
1. Denmark
2. Russia
3. Serbia
4. France
5. Germany
6. Czech Republic
7. Ukraine
8. Spain

=== Draw ===
The draw was announced on 20 October 2020. Lithuania withdrew from the tournament due to one of the team members testing positive for COVID-19.

Group 1	Group 2	Group 3	Group 4
Denmark; Faroe Islands; Finland; Germany	Czech Republic; Portugal; Russia; Sweden	Italy; Lithuania; Serbia; Spain	Estonia; France; Slovenia; Switzerland; Ukraine

== Group stage ==
=== Group 1 ===
Pos	Team	Pld	W	L	MF	MA	MD	GF	GA	GD	PF	PA	PD	Pts	Qualification	Denmark	Germany	Finland	Faroe Islands
1	Denmark	3	3	0	11	4	+7	24	8	+16	644	451	+193	3	Advance to knockout stage	—	3–2	3–2	5–0
2	Germany	3	2	1	11	4	+7	22	10	+12	614	483	+131	2	Advance to knockout stage		—	4–1	5–0
3	Finland (H)	3	1	2	8	7	+1	17	16	+1	551	531	+20	1				—	5–0
4	Faroe Islands	3	0	3	0	15	−15	1	30	−29	301	645	−344	0					—

Source: TS
(H) Host

==== Germany vs Finland ====
Germany
4
Pajulahti Sports Institute, Court 1
29 October 2020, 19:00 UTC+2

Finland
1

			1	2	3
1	(Germany) (Finland)	Matthias Kicklitz / Thuc Phuong Nguyen; Joakim Oldorff / Jannica Monnberg	21; 13	21; 9
2	(Germany) (Finland)	Leona Michalski; Nella Nyqvist	10; 21	7; 21
3	(Germany) (Finland)	Aaron Sonnenschein; Joakim Oldorff	21; 12	16; 21	21; 18
4	(Germany) (Finland)	Leona Michalski / Thuc Phuong Nguyen; Nella Nyqvist / Julia Salonen	21; 7	21; 12
5	(Germany) (Finland)	Malik Bourakkadi / Matthias Kicklitz; Robin Jäntti / Niilo Nyqvist	21; 13	21; 17

==== Denmark vs Faroe Islands ====
Denmark
5
Pajulahti Sports Institute, Court 2
29 October 2020, 19:00 UTC+2

Faroe Islands
0

			1	2	3
1	(Denmark) (Faroe Islands)	William Kryger Boe / Frederikke Østergaard; Rúni Øster / Miriam í Grótinum	21; 6	21; 7
2	(Denmark) (Faroe Islands)	Mads Juel Møller; Hans Elttør	21; 6	21; 9
3	(Denmark) (Faroe Islands)	Frederikke Østergaard; Bjarnhild Justinussen	21; 9	21; 15
4	(Denmark) (Faroe Islands)	William Kryger Boe / Mads Vestergaard; Hans Elttør / Hákon Thorkildshøj Sigvardsen	21; 6	21; 5
5	(Denmark) (Faroe Islands)	Simona Pilgaard / Anna Siess Ryberg; Miriam í Grótinum / Lena Maria Joensen	21; 15	21; 8

==== Denmark vs Finland ====
Denmark
4
Pajulahti Sports Institute, Court 1
30 October 2020, 19:00 UTC+2

Finland
1

			1	2	3
1	(Denmark) (Finland)	Marcus Rindshøj / Mette Werge; Robin Jäntti / Jannica Monnberg	21; 12	21; 16
2	(Denmark) (Finland)	Christopher Vittoriani; Joakim Oldorff	21; 10	19; 21	10; 21
3	(Denmark) (Finland)	Simona Pilgaard; Nella Nyqvist	19; 21	18; 21
4	(Denmark) (Finland)	Christian Faust Kjær / Marcus Rindshøj; Safin Emran / Juuso Kuoppala	21; 7	21; 12
5	(Denmark) (Finland)	Clara Løber / Mette Werge; Jannica Monnberg / Julia Salonen	21; 7	21; 14

==== Germany vs Faroe Islands ====
Germany
5
Pajulahti Sports Institute, Court 2
30 October 2020, 19:00 UTC+2

Faroe Islands
0

			1	2	3
1	(Germany) (Faroe Islands)	Antonia Schaller; Miriam í Grótinum	21; 8	21; 11
2	(Germany) (Faroe Islands)	Jonathan Dresp; Hákon Thorkildshøj Sigvardsen	21; 2	21; 9
3	(Germany) (Faroe Islands)	Mareike Bittner / Florentine Schöffski; Bjarnhild Justinussen / Lena Maria Joensen	21; 11	21; 13
4	(Germany) (Faroe Islands)	Kilian Maurer / Matthias Schnabel; Hákon Thorkildshøj Sigvardsen / Rúni Øster	21; 9	21; 13
5	(Germany) (Faroe Islands)	Jarne Schlevoigt / Julia Meyer; Hans Elttør / Bjarnhild Justinussen	21; 9	21; 13

==== Denmark vs Germany ====
Denmark
3
Pajulahti Sports Institute, Court 4
31 October 2020, 14:00 UTC+2

Germany
2

			1	2	3
1	(Denmark) (Germany)	Mads Vestergaard / Clara Løber; Matthias Kicklitz / Thuc Phuong Nguyen	21; 17	16; 21	19; 21
2	(Denmark) (Germany)	Magnus Johannesen; Kilian Maurer	21; 12	22; 20
3	(Denmark) (Germany)	Benedicte Sillassen; Leona Michalski	21; 15	21; 14
4	(Denmark) (Germany)	William Kryger Boe / Mads Vestergaard; Matthias Kicklitz / Aaron Sonnenschein	21; 18	25; 23
5	(Denmark) (Germany)	Simona Pilgaard / Anna Siess Ryberg; Leona Michalski / Thuc Phuong Nguyen	18; 21	16; 21

==== Finland vs Faroe Islands ====
Finland
5
Pajulahti Sports Institute, Court 1
31 October 2020, 19:00 UTC+2

Faroe Islands
0

			1	2	3
1	(Finland) (Faroe Islands)	Joakim Oldorff; Hans Elttør	21; 3	21; 2
2	(Finland) (Faroe Islands)	Julia Salonen; Lena Maria Joensen	21; 13	21; 11
3	(Finland) (Faroe Islands)	Robin Jäntti / Niilo Nyqvist; Hákon Thorkildshøj Sigvardsen / Rúni Øster	21; 11	21; 6
4	(Finland) (Faroe Islands)	Sarah Asfar / Nella Nyqvist; Bjarnhild Justinussen / Lena Maria Joensen	21; 15	21; 16
5	(Finland) (Faroe Islands)	Juuso Kuoppala / Noora Nokkala; Rúni Øster / Miriam í Grótinum	21; 9	15; 21	21; 10

=== Group 2 ===
Pos	Team	Pld	W	L	MF	MA	MD	GF	GA	GD	PF	PA	PD	Pts	Qualification	Russia	Sweden	Czech Republic	Portugal
1	Russia	3	3	0	10	5	+5	22	11	+11	655	554	+101	3	Advance to knockout stage	—	4–1	3–2	4–1
2	Sweden	3	2	1	10	5	+5	21	13	+8	642	589	+53	2	Advance to knockout stage		—	4–1	3–2
3	Czech Republic	3	1	2	7	8	−1	17	17	0	625	581	+44	1				—	4–1
4	Portugal	3	0	3	3	12	−9	7	26	−19	462	660	−198	0					—

Source: TS

==== Russia vs Portugal ====
Russia
4
Pajulahti Sports Institute, Court 3
29 October 2020, 19:00 UTC+2

Portugal
1

			1	2	3
1	(Russia) (Portugal)	Egor Velp / Regina Galiakhmetova; Gabriel Rodrigues / Mariana Neves	14; 21	19; 21
2	(Russia) (Portugal)	Georgii Lebedev; David Silva	21; 12	21; 17
3	(Russia) (Portugal)	Mariia Golubeva; Madalena Fortunato	21; 14	21; 13
4	(Russia) (Portugal)	Egor Kholkin / Artur Pechenkin; Diogo Glória / Gabriel Rodrigues	21; 18	21; 11
5	(Russia) (Portugal)	Elena Filippova / Anastasiia Shapovalova; Mariana Afonso / Mariana Neves	21; 12	21; 9

==== Czech Republic vs Sweden ====
Czech Republic
1
Pajulahti Sports Institute, Court 4
29 October 2020, 19:00 UTC+2

Sweden
4

			1	2	3
1	(Czech Republic) (Sweden)	Tomáš Švejda / Kateřina Zuzáková; Gustav Bjorkler / Jessica Silvennoinen	21; 19	19; 21	18; 21
2	(Czech Republic) (Sweden)	Tallulah Sharleen van Coppenolle; Edith Urell	15; 21	12; 21
3	(Czech Republic) (Sweden)	Jan Janoštík; Gustav Bjorkler	18; 21	14; 21
4	(Czech Republic) (Sweden)	Lucie Krpatová / Kateřina Zuzáková; Edith Urell / Cecilia Wang	12; 21	14; 21
5	(Czech Republic) (Sweden)	Jan Janoštík / Tomáš Švejda; Ludwig Axelsson / Filip Karlborg	21; 11	21; 19

==== Russia vs Sweden ====
Russia
3
Pajulahti Sports Institute, Court 1
30 October 2020, 14:00 UTC+2

Sweden
2

			1	2	3
1	(Russia) (Sweden)	Anastasiia Shapovalova; Edith Urell	19; 21	19; 21
2	(Russia) (Sweden)	Georgii Lebedev; Gustav Bjorkler	21; 11	15; 21	24; 26
3	(Russia) (Sweden)	Anastasiia Boiarun / Alena Iakovleva; Jessica Silvennoinen / Cecilia Wang	21; 14	21; 6
4	(Russia) (Sweden)	Egor Kholkin / Artur Pechenkin; Theodor Hylander / Filip Karlborg	21; 17	21; 17
5	(Russia) (Sweden)	Lev Barinov / Anastasiia Boiarun; Gustav Bjorkler / Edith Urell	21; 16	22; 20

==== Czech Republic vs Portugal ====
Czech Republic
4
Pajulahti Sports Institute, Court 2
30 October 2020, 14:00 UTC+2

Portugal
1

			1	2	3
1	(Czech Republic) (Portugal)	Tomáš Švejda / Kateřina Zuzáková; Gabriel Rodrigues / Mariana Neves	21; 10	21; 14
2	(Czech Republic) (Portugal)	Jan Janoštík; Diogo Glória	21; 11	21; 13
3	(Czech Republic) (Portugal)	Tallulah Sharleen van Coppenolle; Ana Fernandes	21; 5	21; 4
4	(Czech Republic) (Portugal)	Jan Janoštík / Tomáš Švejda; Diogo Glória / Gabriel Rodrigues	19; 21	21; 11	16; 21
5	(Czech Republic) (Portugal)	Lucie Krpatová / Kateřina Zuzáková; Mariana Afonso / Ana Fernandes	21; 14	21; 11

==== Sweden vs Portugal ====
Sweden
4
Pajulahti Sports Institute, Court 1
31 October 2020, 14:00 UTC+2

Portugal
1

			1	2	3
1	(Sweden) (Portugal)	Theodor Hylander / Jessica Silvennoinen; Gabriel Rodrigues / Mariana Neves	21; 13	17; 21	21; 18
2	(Sweden) (Portugal)	Filip Karlborg; Diogo Glória	21; 12	19; 21	10; 21
3	(Sweden) (Portugal)	Julia Tuvesson; Ana Fernandes	21; 7	21; 12
4	(Sweden) (Portugal)	Theodor Hylander / Filip Karlborg; Diogo Glória / Gabriel Rodrigues	21; 13	21; 9
5	(Sweden) (Portugal)	Jessica Silvennoinen / Cecilia Wang; Mariana Afonso / Ana Fernandes	21; 13	21; 19

==== Russia vs Czech Republic ====
Russia
4
Pajulahti Sports Institute, Court 2
31 October 2020, 14:00 UTC+2

Czech Republic
1

			1	2	3
1	(Russia) (Czech Republic)	Lev Barinov / Anastasiia Boiarun; Tomáš Švejda / Kateřina Zuzáková	21; 19	18; 21	19; 21
2	(Russia) (Czech Republic)	Georgii Lebedev; Jan Janoštík	19; 21	10; 21
3	(Russia) (Czech Republic)	Mariia Golubeva; Tallulah Sharleen van Coppenolle	21; 19	15; 21	21; 10
4	(Russia) (Czech Republic)	Egor Kholkin / Artur Pechenkin; Jan Janoštík / Tomáš Švejda	21; 14	22; 20
5	(Russia) (Czech Republic)	Elena Filippova / Anastasiia Shapovalova; Lucie Krpatová / Kateřina Zuzáková	21; 12	21; 17

=== Group 3 ===
Pos	Team	Pld	W	L	MF	MA	MD	GF	GA	GD	PF	PA	PD	Pts	Qualification	Spain	Serbia	Italy	Lithuania
1	Spain	2	2	0	7	3	+4	15	10	+5	455	449	+6	2	Advance to knockout stage	—	3–2	4–1	w.o.
2	Serbia	2	1	1	6	4	+2	14	9	+5	442	367	+75	1	Advance to knockout stage		—	4–1	w.o.
3	Italy	2	0	2	2	8	−6	6	16	−10	348	429	−81	0				—	w.o.
4	Lithuania	0	0	0	0	0	0	0	0	0	0	0	0	0	Withdrew				—

Source: TS

==== Serbia vs Lithuania ====
Serbia
-
Pajulahti Sports Institute, Court 3
29 October 2020, 14:00 UTC+2

Lithuania
Withdrew

		1	2	3
1	(Serbia) (Lithuania)
2	(Serbia) (Lithuania)
3	(Serbia) (Lithuania)
4	(Serbia) (Lithuania)
5	(Serbia) (Lithuania)

==== Spain vs Italy ====
Spain
3
Pajulahti Sports Institute, Court 4
29 October 2020, 14:00 UTC+1

Italy
2

			1	2	3
1	(Spain) (Italy)	Jacobo Fernández; Luca Zhou	16; 21	21; 14	21; 15
2	(Spain) (Italy)	Lucía Rodríguez; Judith Mair	21; 15	21; 12
3	(Spain) (Italy)	Jacobo Fernández / Rubén García; Alessandro Gozzini / Matteo Massetti	21; 15	21; 18
4	(Spain) (Italy)	Ana Caballero / Adika Carulla; Katharina Fink / Yasmine Hamza	9; 21	16; 21
5	(Spain) (Italy)	Rubén García / Candela Arcos; Luca Zhou / Martina Corsini	18; 21	22; 20	21; 15

==== Serbia vs Italy ====
Serbia
4
Pajulahti Sports Institute, Court 1
30 October 2020, 09:00 UTC+1

Italy
1

			1	2	3
1	(Serbia) (Italy)	Mihajlo Tomić / Andjela Vitman; Matteo Massetti / Yasmine Hamza	21; 13	21; 12
2	(Serbia) (Italy)	Sergej Lukić; Alessandro Gozzini	21; 7	21; 14
3	(Serbia) (Italy)	Marija Sudimac; Katharina Fink	21; 14	21; 15
4	(Serbia) (Italy)	Ivan Kovačević / Mihajlo Tomić; Matteo Massetti / Luca Zhou	21; 11	21; 12
5	(Serbia) (Italy)	Sara Lončar / Andjela Vitman; Katharina Fink / Yasmine Hamza	16; 21	17; 21

==== Spain vs Lithuania ====
Spain
-
Pajulahti Sports Institute, Court 2
29 October 2020, 14:00 UTC+2

Lithuania
Withdrew

		1	2	3
1	(Spain) (Lithuania)
2	(Spain) (Lithuania)
3	(Spain) (Lithuania)
4	(Spain) (Lithuania)
5	(Spain) (Lithuania)

==== Italy vs Lithuania ====
Italy
-
Pajulahti Sports Institute, Court 3
29 October 2020, 14:00 UTC+2

Lithuania
Withdrew

		1	2	3
1	(Italy) (Lithuania)
2	(Italy) (Lithuania)
3	(Italy) (Lithuania)
4	(Italy) (Lithuania)
5	(Italy) (Lithuania)

==== Serbia vs Spain ====
Serbia
2
Pajulahti Sports Institute, Court 4
31 October 2020, 09:00 UTC+1

Spain
3

			1	2	3
1	(Serbia) (Spain)	Mihajlo Tomić / Andjela Vitman; Salvador Franco / Maria De La O Perez	21; 12	21; 15
2	(Serbia) (Spain)	Sergej Lukić; Miguel Esteve	19; 21	21; 10	13; 21
3	(Serbia) (Spain)	Marija Sudimac; Lucía Rodríguez	21; 11	16; 21	19; 21
4	(Serbia) (Spain)	Sergej Lukić / Mihajlo Tomić; Jacobo Fernández / Rubén García	20; 22	21; 17	21; 14
5	(Serbia) (Spain)	Sara Lončar / Andjela Vitman; Candela Arcos / Lucía Rodríguez	16; 21	12; 21

=== Group 4 ===
Pos	Team	Pld	W	L	MF	MA	MD	GF	GA	GD	PF	PA	PD	Pts	Qualification	France	Estonia	Ukraine	Switzerland	Slovenia
1	France	4	4	0	17	3	+14	36	9	+27	919	678	+241	4	Advance to knockout stage	—	5–0	3–2	4–1	5–0
2	Estonia	4	3	1	12	8	+4	26	19	+7	840	786	+54	3	Advance to knockout stage		—	4–1	3–2	5–0
3	Ukraine	4	2	2	12	8	+4	27	20	+7	858	854	+4	2				—	4–1	5–0
4	Switzerland	4	1	3	8	12	−4	17	27	−10	756	829	−73	1					—	4–1
5	Slovenia	4	0	4	1	19	−18	7	38	−31	680	906	−226	0						—

Source: TS

==== France vs Switzerland ====
France
4
Pajulahti Sports Institute, Court 1
29 October 2020, 14:00 UTC+1

Switzerland
1

			1	2	3
1	(France) (Switzerland)	Anna Tatranova; Julie Franconville	21; 18	21; 19
2	(France) (Switzerland)	Alex Lanier; Lorrain Joliat	21; 10	21; 10
3	(France) (Switzerland)	Flavie Vallet / Emilie Vercelot; Julie Franconville / Caroline Racloz	21; 11	12; 21	16; 21
4	(France) (Switzerland)	Alex Lanier / Lucas Renoir; Mathis Chanthakesone / Nicolas Franconville	21; 10	21; 14
5	(France) (Switzerland)	Christo Popov / Flavie Vallet; Arthur Boudier / Caroline Racloz	17; 21	21; 16	21; 11

==== Ukraine vs Estonia ====
Ukraine
2
Pajulahti Sports Institute, Court 2
29 October 2020, 14:00 UTC+1

Estonia
3

			1	2	3
1	(Ukraine) (Estonia)	Viacheslav Yakovlev / Polina Tkach; Oskar Männik / Ramona Üprus	21; 16	12; 21	14; 21
2	(Ukraine) (Estonia)	Yevhenii Stolovoi; Tauri Kilk	14; 21	13; 21
3	(Ukraine) (Estonia)	Polina Buhrova; Catlyn Kruus	21; 17	17; 21	21; 19
4	(Ukraine) (Estonia)	Volodymyr Koluzaiev / Vitaliy Reva; Mario Kirisma / Oskar Männik	18; 21	17; 21
5	(Ukraine) (Estonia)	Polina Buhrova / Mariia Stoliarenko; Catlyn Kruus / Ramona Üprus	21; 18	21; 23	16; 21

==== France vs Estonia ====
France
5
Pajulahti Sports Institute, Court 2
30 October 2020, 09:00 UTC+1

Estonia
0

			1	2	3
1	(France) (Estonia)	Anna Tatranova; Ramona Üprus	21; 14	21; 15
2	(France) (Estonia)	Christo Popov; Tauri Kilk	21; 15	21; 11
3	(France) (Estonia)	Flavie Vallet / Emilie Vercelot; Catlyn Kruus / Ramona Üprus	25; 27	21; 13	21; 9
4	(France) (Estonia)	Alex Lanier / Lucas Renoir; Mario Kirisma / Oskar Männik	21; 9	21; 13
5	(France) (Estonia)	Christo Popov / Emilie Vercelot; Tauri Kilk / Catlyn Kruus	21; 18	21; 17

==== Slovenia vs Switzerland ====
Slovenia
1
Pajulahti Sports Institute, Court 3
30 October 2020, 09:00 UTC+1

Switzerland
4

			1	2	3
1	(Slovenia) (Switzerland)	Anja Jordan; Julie Franconville	9; 21	15; 21
2	(Slovenia) (Switzerland)	Rok Kuprivec; Mathis Chanthakesone	21; 9	21; 18
3	(Slovenia) (Switzerland)	Lina Pipan / Taja Pipan; Julie Franconville / Caroline Racloz	9; 21	9; 21
4	(Slovenia) (Switzerland)	Gal Bizjak / Rok Kuprivec; Mathis Chanthakesone / Nicolas Franconville	25; 27	21; 16	16; 21
5	(Slovenia) (Switzerland)	Miha Masten / Taja Pipan; Arthur Boudier / Caroline Racloz	14; 21	16; 21

==== Ukraine vs Switzerland ====
Ukraine
5
Pajulahti Sports Institute, Court 3
30 October 2020, 19:00 UTC+1

Switzerland
0

			1	2	3
1	(Ukraine) (Switzerland)	Viacheslav Yakovlev / Polina Tkach; Arthur Boudier / Caroline Racloz	17; 21	22; 20	14; 21
2	(Ukraine) (Switzerland)	Polina Buhrova; Julie Franconville	23; 21	21; 13
3	(Ukraine) (Switzerland)	Viacheslav Yakovlev; Lorrain Joliat	21; 16	21; 10
4	(Ukraine) (Switzerland)	Arina Marushchak / Mariia Stoliarenko; Julie Franconville / Caroline Racloz	21; 14	21; 12
5	(Ukraine) (Switzerland)	Andrei Don / Vitaliy Reva; Arthur Boudier / Nicolas Franconville	23; 21	23; 21

==== France vs Slovenia ====
France
5
Pajulahti Sports Institute, Court 4
30 October 2020, 19:00 UTC+1

Slovenia
0

			1	2	3
1	(France) (Slovenia)	Floriane Nurit; Anja Jordan	19; 21	21; 14	21; 19
2	(France) (Slovenia)	Yanis Gaudin; Rok Kuprivec	21; 12	21; 16
3	(France) (Slovenia)	Laeticia Jaffrennou / Anna Tatranova; Lina Pipan / Taja Pipan	21; 14	21; 9
4	(France) (Slovenia)	Sacha Leveque / Aymeric Tores; Miha Masten / Nik Zupančič	21; 15	21; 11
5	(France) (Slovenia)	Lucas Renoir / Tea Margueritte; Jan Babnik / Taja Pipan	21; 14	21; 19

==== Estonia vs Switzerland ====
Estonia
3
Pajulahti Sports Institute, Court 1
31 October 2020, 09:00 UTC+1

Switzerland
2

			1	2	3
1	(Estonia) (Switzerland)	Oskar Männik / Ramona Üprus; Arthur Boudier / Caroline Racloz	14; 21	18; 21
2	(Estonia) (Switzerland)	Tauri Kilk; Mathis Chanthakesone	21; 13	21; 15
3	(Estonia) (Switzerland)	Catlyn Kruus; Lucie Amiguet	21; 19	21; 12
4	(Estonia) (Switzerland)	Mario Kirisma / Oskar Männik; Arthur Boudier / Nicolas Franconville	23; 25	11; 21
5	(Estonia) (Switzerland)	Catlyn Kruus / Ramona Üprus; Julie Franconville / Caroline Racloz	21; 10	21; 10

==== Ukraine vs Slovenia ====
Ukraine
5
Pajulahti Sports Institute, Court 2
31 October 2020, 09:00 UTC+1

Slovenia
0

			1	2	3
1	(Ukraine) (Slovenia)	Andrei Don / Olga Tykhorskaya; Jan Babnik / Taja Pipan	21; 18	21; 16
2	(Ukraine) (Slovenia)	Viacheslav Yakovlev; Rok Kuprivec	21; 12	14; 21	22; 20
3	(Ukraine) (Slovenia)	Mariia Stoliarenko; Anja Jordan	21; 12	21; 10
4	(Ukraine) (Slovenia)	Andrei Don / Vitaliy Reva; Gal Bizjak / Rok Kuprivec	21; 12	9; 21	21; 17
5	(Ukraine) (Slovenia)	Polina Buhrova / Mariia Stoliarenko; Lina Pipan / Taja Pipan	21; 13	21; 10

==== France vs Ukraine ====
France
3
Pajulahti Sports Institute, Court 2
31 October 2020, 19:00 UTC+1

Ukraine
2

			1	2	3
1	(France) (Ukraine)	Christo Popov; Volodymyr Koluzaiev	21; 3	21; 11
2	(France) (Ukraine)	Anna Tatranova; Polina Buhrova	19; 21	17; 21
3	(France) (Ukraine)	Alex Lanier / Christo Popov; Andrei Don / Vitaliy Reva	21; 16	21; 12
4	(France) (Ukraine)	Flavie Vallet / Emilie Vercelot; Arina Marushchak / Mariia Stoliarenko	21; 13	21; 14
5	(France) (Ukraine)	Nicolas Hoareau / Laeticia Jaffrennou; Viacheslav Yakovlev / Polina Buhrova	21; 17	20; 22	18; 21

==== Slovenia vs Estonia ====
Slovenia
0
Pajulahti Sports Institute, Court 4
31 October 2020, 19:00 UTC+1

Estonia
5

			1	2	3
1	(Slovenia) (Estonia)	Jan Babnik / Taja Pipan; Oskar Männik / Ramona Üprus	14; 21	9; 21
2	(Slovenia) (Estonia)	Miha Masten; Tauri Kilk	16; 21	12; 21
3	(Slovenia) (Estonia)	Anja Jordan; Catlyn Kruus	10; 21	12; 21
4	(Slovenia) (Estonia)	Gal Bizjak / Rok Kuprivec; Mario Kirisma / Oskar Männik	17; 21	21; 12	23; 25
5	(Slovenia) (Estonia)	Lina Pipan / Taja Pipan; Catlyn Kruus / Ramona Üprus	10; 21	14; 21

== Knockout stage ==
=== Bracket ===
Quarter-finals
Denmark	3
Sweden	0
Spain	2
Estonia	3
Serbia	0
France	3
Germany	1
Russia	3

Semi-finals
Denmark	3
Estonia	0
France	3
Russia	1

Final
Denmark	3
France	0

=== Quarter-finals ===
==== Denmark vs Sweden ====
Denmark
3
Pajulahti Sports Institute, Court 2
1 November 2020, 10:00 UTC+2

Sweden
1

			1	2	3
1	(Denmark) (Sweden)	Magnus Johannesen; Filip Karlborg	21; 13	21; 16
2	(Denmark) (Sweden)	Benedicte Sillassen; Edith Urell	21; 18	9; 21	22; 20
3	(Denmark) (Sweden)	William Kryger Boe / Mads Vestergaard; Gustav Bjorkler / Filip Karlborg	21; 12	21; 19
4	(Denmark) (Sweden)	Simona Pilgaard / Anna Siess Ryberg; Edith Urell / Cecilia Wang				not played
5	(Denmark) (Sweden)	Mads Vestergaard / Clara Løber; Gustav Bjorkler / Jessica Silvennoinen				not played

==== Spain vs Estonia ====
Spain
1
Pajulahti Sports Institute, Court 3
1 November 2020, 10:00 UTC+2

Estonia
4

			1	2	3
1	(Spain) (Estonia)	Rubén García / Candela Arcos; Oskar Männik / Ramona Üprus	21; 13	24; 22
2	(Spain) (Estonia)	Miguel Esteve; Tauri Kilk	18; 21	15; 21
3	(Spain) (Estonia)	Lucía Rodríguez; Catlyn Kruus	18; 21	16; 21
4	(Spain) (Estonia)	Jacobo Fernández / Rubén García; Mario Kirisma / Oskar Männik	21; 18	21; 16
5	(Spain) (Estonia)	Candela Arcos / Lucía Rodríguez; Catlyn Kruus / Ramona Üprus				not played

==== Serbia vs France ====
Serbia
0
Pajulahti Sports Institute, Court 4
1 November 2020, 10:00 UTC+2

France
3

			1	2	3
1	(Serbia) (France)	Mihajlo Tomić / Andjela Vitman; Christo Popov / Flavie Vallet	17; 21	21; 18	18; 21
2	(Serbia) (France)	Ivan Kovačević; Alex Lanier	21; 19	8; 21	9; 21
3	(Serbia) (France)	Marija Sudimac; Anna Tatranova	19; 21	14; 21
4	(Serbia) (France)	Sergej Lukić / Mihajlo Tomić; Alex Lanier / Christo Popov				not played
5	(Serbia) (France)	Sara Lončar / Marija Sudimac; Flavie Vallet / Emilie Vercelot				not played

==== Germany vs Russia ====
Germany
1
Pajulahti Sports Institute, Court 1
1 November 2020, 10:00 UTC+2

Russia
3

			1	2	3
1	(Germany) (Russia)	Aaron Sonnenschein / Leona Michalski; Egor Kholkin / Anastasiia Boiarun	15; 21	12; 21
2	(Germany) (Russia)	Matthias Kicklitz; Georgii Lebedev	21; 16	22; 20
3	(Germany) (Russia)	Mareike Bittner; Mariia Golubeva	22; 20	18; 21	9; 21
4	(Germany) (Russia)	Matthias Kicklitz / Aaron Sonnenschein; Egor Kholkin / Georgii Lebedev	16; 21	12; 21
5	(Germany) (Russia)	Leona Michalski / Thuc Phuong Nguyen; Elena Filippova / Anastasiia Shapovalova				not played

=== Semi-finals ===
==== Denmark vs Estonia ====
Denmark
3
Pajulahti Sports Institute, Court 2
1 November 2020, 16:00 UTC+2

Estonia
0

			1	2	3
1	(Denmark) (Estonia)	Mads Vestergaard / Clara Løber; Oskar Männik / Ramona Üprus	21; 12	21; 11
2	(Denmark) (Estonia)	Mads Juel Møller; Tauri Kilk	21; 8	21; 14
3	(Denmark) (Estonia)	Frederikke Østergaard; Catlyn Kruus	21; 16	21; 12
4	(Denmark) (Estonia)	Christian Faust Kjær / Marcus Rindshøj; Mario Kirisma / Oskar Männik				not played
5	(Denmark) (Estonia)	Clara Løber / Mette Werge; Catlyn Kruus / Ramona Üprus				not played

==== France vs Russia ====
France
3
Pajulahti Sports Institute, Court 1
1 November 2020, 16:00 UTC+2

Russia
1

			1	2	3
1	(France) (Russia)	Christo Popov / Flavie Vallet; Egor Kholkin / Anastasiia Boiarun	15; 21	21; 18	21; 18
2	(France) (Russia)	Alex Lanier; Igor Pushkarev	21; 12	21; 8
3	(France) (Russia)	Anna Tatranova; Anastasiia Shapovalova	13; 21	12; 21
4	(France) (Russia)	Alex Lanier / Christo Popov; Egor Kholkin / Georgii Lebedev	22; 20	21; 16
5	(France) (Russia)	Flavie Vallet / Emilie Vercelot; Anastasiia Boiarun / Alena Iakovleva				not played

=== Final ===
==== Denmark vs France ====
Denmark
3
Pajulahti Sports Institute, Court 1
2 November 2020, 10:00 UTC+2

France
0

			1	2	3
1	(Denmark) (France)	Mads Vestergaard / Clara Løber; Christo Popov / Flavie Vallet	18; 21	21; 17	21; 19
2	(Denmark) (France)	Magnus Johannesen; Alex Lanier	22; 20	17; 21	21; 9
3	(Denmark) (France)	Benedicte Sillassen; Anna Tatranova	21; 8	21; 17
4	(Denmark) (France)	William Kryger Boe / Mads Vestergaard; Alex Lanier / Christo Popov				not played
5	(Denmark) (France)	Simona Pilgaard / Anna Siess Ryberg; Flavie Vallet / Emilie Vercelot				not played
