= 2022 European Junior Badminton Championships – Teams event =

2022 European Junior Badminton Championships – Mixed team
- Venue: Athletic Hall Belgrade
- Location: Belgrade, Serbia
- Dates: 18 August 2022 – 22 August 2022
- Nations: 32

Medalists
gold medal	Denmark
silver medal	France
bronze medal	Spain
bronze medal	Ukraine

The mixed team tournament of the 2022 European Junior Badminton Championships was held from 18 to 22 August 2022.

== Tournament ==
=== Venue ===
This tournament was held at Athletic Hall Belgrade in Belgrade, Serbia.

=== Draw ===
The draw was announced on 10 August 2022.

Group 1	Group 2	Group 3	Group 4
France; Ireland; Scotland; Turkey	Belgium; Denmark; Finland; Slovenia	Germany; Greece; Portugal; Serbia	Israel; Italy; Netherlands; Spain
Group 5	Group 6	Group 7	Group 8
Czech Republic; Estonia; Latvia; Poland	Croatia; Hungary; Romania; Ukraine	Austria; Slovakia; Sweden; Switzerland	Bulgaria; England; Lithuania; Norway

== Group stage ==
=== Group 1 ===
Pos	Team	Pld	W	L	MF	MA	MD	GF	GA	GD	PF	PA	PD	Pts	Qualification	France	Turkey	Ireland	Scotland
1	France	3	3	0	14	1	+13	29	5	+24	705	517	+188	3	Advance to knockout stage	—	5–0	4–1	5–0
2	Turkey	3	2	1	8	7	+1	18	15	+3	626	595	+31	2			—	4–1	4–1
3	Ireland	3	1	2	5	10	−5	11	22	−11	582	638	−56	1				—	3–2
4	Scotland	3	0	3	3	12	−9	9	25	−16	529	692	−163	0					—

Source: TS

==== France vs Turkey ====
France
5
Athletic Hall Belgrade, Court 5
18 August 2022, 10:00 UTC+2

Turkey
0

			1	2	3
1	(France) (Turkey)	Lucas Renoir / Téa Margueritte; Arda Doğaç Atan / Nisanur Tunçer	21; 12	18; 21	21; 17
2	(France) (Turkey)	Simon Baron-Vezilier; Miraç Kantar	21; 13	21; 13
3	(France) (Turkey)	Emilie Drouin; Ravza Bodur	21; 13	21; 16
4	(France) (Turkey)	Maël Cattoen / Lucas Renoir; Burak Mert Alkaya / Furkan Sarac	21; 17	21; 15
5	(France) (Turkey)	Téa Margueritte / Camille Pognante; Cansu Erçetin / Bahar Sabanci	21; 19	25; 23

==== Scotland vs Ireland ====
Scotland
2
Athletic Hall Belgrade, Court 6
18 August 2022, 10:00 UTC+2

Ireland
3

			1	2	3
1	(Scotland) (Republic of Ireland)	Angus Meldrum / Brooke Stalker; Scott Guildea / Sophia Noble	24; 22	21; 15
2	(Scotland) (Republic of Ireland)	Finlay Jack; Matthew Cheung	11; 21	9; 21
3	(Scotland) (Republic of Ireland)	Abbie Brooks; Sophia Noble	17; 21	21; 17	18; 21
4	(Scotland) (Republic of Ireland)	Anthony McGuire / Angus Meldrum; Scott Guildea / Vincent Pontanosa	18; 21	14; 21
5	(Scotland) (Republic of Ireland)	Katrina Chan / Brooke Stalker; Laura Comer / Siofra Flynn	21; 17	21; 18

==== France vs Ireland ====
France
4
Athletic Hall Belgrade, Court 1
19 August 2022, 18:00 UTC+2

Ireland
1

			1	2	3
1	(France) (Republic of Ireland)	Lucas Renoir / Téa Margueritte; Stuart McCollam / Laura Comer	21; 12	21; 8
2	(France) (Republic of Ireland)	Simon Baron-Vezilier; Matthew Cheung	21; 14	20; 22	21; 17
3	(France) (Republic of Ireland)	Emilie Drouin; Sophia Noble	21; 16	11; 21	20; 22
4	(France) (Republic of Ireland)	Maël Cattoen / Lucas Renoir; Scott Guildea / Vincent Pontanosa	21; 13	21; 16
5	(France) (Republic of Ireland)	Téa Margueritte / Camille Pognante; Neasa Flynn / Siofra Flynn	21; 17	21; 10

==== Scotland vs Turkey ====
Scotland
1
Athletic Hall Belgrade, Court 2
19 August 2022, 18:00 UTC+2

Turkey
4

			1	2	3
1	(Scotland) (Turkey)	Abbie Brooks; Ravza Bodur	14; 21	21; 17	21; 16
2	(Scotland) (Turkey)	Angus Meldrum; Miraç Kantar	12; 21	12; 21
3	(Scotland) (Turkey)	Ishbel McCallister / Brooke Stalker; Cansu Erçetin / Bahar Sabanci	10; 21	10; 21
4	(Scotland) (Turkey)	Lewis Coghill / Anthony McGuire; Burak Mert Alkaya / Furkan Sarac	12; 21	24; 26
5	(Scotland) (Turkey)	Angus Meldrum / Brooke Stalker; Arda Doğaç Atan / Nisanur Tunçer	16; 21	21; 17	11; 21

==== Ireland vs Turkey ====
Ireland
1
Athletic Hall Belgrade, Court 3
20 August 2022, 14:00 UTC+2

Turkey
4

			1	2	3
1	(Republic of Ireland) (Turkey)	Stuart McCollam / Sophia Noble; Arda Doğaç Atan / Nisanur Tunçer	16; 21	18; 21
2	(Republic of Ireland) (Turkey)	Vincent Pontanosa; Miraç Kantar	20; 22	18; 21
3	(Republic of Ireland) (Turkey)	Siofra Flynn; Bahar Sabanci	19; 21	17; 21
4	(Republic of Ireland) (Turkey)	Stuart McCollam / Vincent Pontanosa; Burak Mert Alkaya / Furkan Sarac	21; 18	21; 16
5	(Republic of Ireland) (Turkey)	Laura Comer / Sophia Noble; Ravza Bodur / Cansu Erçetin	16; 21	13; 21

==== France vs Scotland ====
France
5
Athletic Hall Belgrade, Court 4
20 August 2022, 14:00 UTC+2

Scotland
0

			1	2	3
1	(France) (Scotland)	Paul Tournefier; Finlay Jack	21; 19	24; 22
2	(France) (Scotland)	Malya Hoareau; Abbie Brooks	21; 12	20; 22	21; 19
3	(France) (Scotland)	Maël Cattoen / Baptiste Labarthe; Logan Ireland / Anthony McGuire	21; 6	21; 6
4	(France) (Scotland)	Emilie Drouin / Téa Margueritte; Katrina Chan / Sophie Ford	21; 8	21; 15
5	(France) (Scotland)	Yohan Barbieri / Elsa Jacob; Angus Meldrum / Brooke Stalker	21; 13	21; 8

=== Group 2 ===
Pos	Team	Pld	W	L	MF	MA	MD	GF	GA	GD	PF	PA	PD	Pts	Qualification	Denmark	Finland	Belgium	Slovenia
1	Denmark	3	3	0	15	0	+15	30	1	+29	643	382	+261	3	Advance to knockout stage	—	5–0	5–0	5–0
2	Finland	3	2	1	7	8	−1	16	17	−1	585	577	+8	2			—	3–2	4–1
3	Belgium	3	1	2	6	9	−3	14	20	−6	577	647	−70	1				—	4–1
4	Slovenia	3	0	3	2	13	−11	6	28	−22	520	719	−199	0					—

Source: TS

==== Denmark vs Belgium ====
Denmark
5
Athletic Hall Belgrade, Court 1
18 August 2022, 10:00 UTC+2

Belgium
0

			1	2	3
1	(Denmark) (Belgium)	Jakob Houe / Sofie Røjkjær; Arnaud Huberty / Amber Boonen	21; 11	21; 8
2	(Denmark) (Belgium)	Christian Faust Kjær; Charles Fouyn	21; 13	21; 18
3	(Denmark) (Belgium)	Frederikke Østergaard; Karla Henry	21; 13	21; 9
4	(Denmark) (Belgium)	Hjalte Johansen / Jeppe Søby; Arnaud Huberty / Baptiste Rolin	21; 8	21; 10
5	(Denmark) (Belgium)	Benedicte Silassen / Maria Højlund Tommerup; Amber Boonen / Tammi van Wonterghem	21; 13	21; 7

==== Finland vs Slovenia ====
Finland
4
Athletic Hall Belgrade, Court 2
18 August 2022, 10:00 UTC+2

Slovenia
1

			1	2	3
1	(Finland) (Slovenia)	Niilo Nyqvist; Žiga Podgoršek	21; 14	21; 15
2	(Finland) (Slovenia)	Nella Nyqvist; Spela Alič	21; 6	21; 7
3	(Finland) (Slovenia)	Rasmus Andersson / Aleksi Mäki; Jan Krumpak / Kevin Lin Lenarčič	21; 11	21; 19
4	(Finland) (Slovenia)	Sarah Asfar / Nella Nyqvist; Nika Bedič / Kim Matovič	21; 19	21; 17
5	(Finland) (Slovenia)	Kaiwen Li / Oona Tapola; Žiga Podgoršek / Spela Alič	21; 18	18; 21	20; 22

==== Denmark vs Slovenia ====
Denmark
5
Athletic Hall Belgrade, Court 3
19 August 2022, 18:00 UTC+2

Slovenia
0

			1	2	3
1	(Denmark) (Slovenia)	William Bøgebjerg; Kevin Lin Lenarčič	21; 11	21; 7
2	(Denmark) (Slovenia)	Sofie Karmann; Kim Matovič	21; 11	21; 18
3	(Denmark) (Slovenia)	Jakob Houe / Christian Faust Kjær; Anel Hac Györkös / Jaka Perič Marovt	21; 7	21; 6
4	(Denmark) (Slovenia)	Emma Irring Braüner / Sofie Røjkjær; Nika Bedič / Kim Matovič	21; 15	21; 10
5	(Denmark) (Slovenia)	Jonathan Melgaard / Maria Højlund Tommerup; Žiga Podgoršek / Spela Alič	21; 17	21; 12

==== Finland vs Belgium ====
Finland
3
Athletic Hall Belgrade, Court 4
19 August 2022, 18:00 UTC+2

Belgium
2

			1	2	3
1	(Finland) (Belgium)	Niilo Nyqvist; Charles Fouyn	11; 21	12; 21
2	(Finland) (Belgium)	Nella Nyqvist; Amber Boonen	21; 10	21; 14
3	(Finland) (Belgium)	Rasmus Andersson / Aleksi Mäki; Charles Fouyn / Arnaud Huberty	22; 24	15; 21
4	(Finland) (Belgium)	Petra Saarnivaara / Oona Tapola; Amber Boonen / Tammi van Wonterghem	21; 17	14; 21	21; 18
5	(Finland) (Belgium)	Kaiwen Li / Nella Nyqvist; Baptiste Rolin / Karla Henry	21; 12	21; 6

==== Slovenia vs Belgium ====
Slovenia
1
Athletic Hall Belgrade, Court 5
20 August 2022, 14:00 UTC+2

Belgium
4

			1	2	3
1	(Slovenia) (Belgium)	Žiga Podgoršek; Baptiste Rolin	13; 21	24; 22	14; 21
2	(Slovenia) (Belgium)	Spela Alič; Karla Henry	14; 21	20; 22
3	(Slovenia) (Belgium)	Jan Krumpak / Kevin Lin Lenarčič; Charles Fouyn / Arnaud Huberty	21; 19	15; 21	11; 21
4	(Slovenia) (Belgium)	Nika Bedič / Kim Matovič; Amber Boonen / Tammi van Wonterghem	15; 21	21; 18	26; 24
5	(Slovenia) (Belgium)	Žiga Podgoršek / Spela Alič; Baptiste Rolin / Karla Henry	29; 30	14; 21

==== Denmark vs Finland ====
Denmark
5
Athletic Hall Belgrade, Court 6
20 August 2022, 14:00 UTC+2

Finland
0

			1	2	3
1	(Denmark) (Finland)	Christian Faust Kjær; Niilo Nyqvist	21; 11	21; 13
2	(Denmark) (Finland)	Benedicte Sillassen; Nella Nyqvist	21; 19	10; 21	21; 9
3	(Denmark) (Finland)	Hjalte Johansen / Jeppe Søby; Rasmus Andersson / Kaiwen Li	21; 12	24; 22
4	(Denmark) (Finland)	Frederikke Østergaard / Maria Højlund Tommerup; Petra Saarnivaara / Oona Tapola	21; 4	21; 15
5	(Denmark) (Finland)	Hjalte Johansen / Emma Irring Braüner; Kaiwen Li / Nella Nyqvist	21; 14	21; 18

=== Group 3 ===
Pos	Team	Pld	W	L	MF	MA	MD	GF	GA	GD	PF	PA	PD	Pts	Qualification	Germany	Serbia	Portugal	Greece
1	Germany	3	3	0	15	0	+15	30	2	+28	668	395	+273	3	Advance to knockout stage	—	5–0	5–0	5–0
2	Serbia (H)	3	2	1	8	7	+1	19	14	+5	618	516	+102	2			—	3–2	5–0
3	Portugal	3	1	2	7	8	−1	14	17	−3	519	538	−19	1				—	5–0
4	Greece	3	0	3	0	15	−15	0	30	−30	274	630	−356	0					—

Source: TS
(H) Host

==== Greece vs Serbia ====
Greece
0
Athletic Hall Belgrade, Court 1
18 August 2022, 14:00 UTC+2

Serbia
5

			1	2	3
1	(Greece) (Serbia)	Thomai Agapi Pavlidou; Sanja Perić	9; 21	12; 21
2	(Greece) (Serbia)	Metzelos Sotiropoulos; Viktor Petrović	3; 21	17; 21
3	(Greece) (Serbia)	Stavriani Konstantina Pavlidou / Thomai Agapi Pavlidou; Sanja Perić / Andjela Vitman	3; 21	6; 21
4	(Greece) (Serbia)	Georgios Gkiokas / Maximos Paloukas; Igor Jovanović / Aleksandar Jovičić	13; 21	11; 21
5	(Greece) (Serbia)	Metzelos Sotiropoulos / Petra Zlatintsi; Viktor Petrović / Andjela Vitman	10; 21	5; 21

==== Germany vs Portugal ====
Germany
5
Athletic Hall Belgrade, Court 2
18 August 2022, 14:00 UTC+2

Portugal
0

			1	2	3
1	(Germany) (Portugal)	Kenneth Neumann; Tiago Berenguer	21; 11	21; 12
2	(Germany) (Portugal)	Antonia Schaller; Madalena Fortunato	21; 19	21; 19
3	(Germany) (Portugal)	Jarne Schlevoigt / Nikolaj Stupplich; Santiago Batalha / Mathias Rodrigues	21; 10	21; 14
4	(Germany) (Portugal)	Selin Hübsch / Julia Meyer; Beatriz Roberto / Marta Sousa	21; 10	21; 10
5	(Germany) (Portugal)	Jonathan Dresp / Anna Mejikovskiy; Goncalo Silva / Margarida Cabaco	21; 11	21; 14

==== Germany vs Serbia ====
Germany
5
Athletic Hall Belgrade, Court 1
19 August 2022, 10:00 UTC+2

Serbia
0

			1	2	3
1	(Germany) (Serbia)	Jarne Schlevoigt / Julia Meyer; Viktor Petrović / Andjela Vitman	21; 18	19; 21	21; 19
2	(Germany) (Serbia)	Antonia Schaller; Sanja Perić	21; 15	21; 15
3	(Germany) (Serbia)	Karim Krehemeier; Viktor Petrović	21; 12	21; 13
4	(Germany) (Serbia)	Selin Hübsch / Julia Meyer; Sanja Perić / Andjela Vitman	21; 16	19; 21	21; 12
5	(Germany) (Serbia)	Jarne Schlevoigt / Nikolaj Stupplich; Igor Jovanović / Aleksandar Jovičić	21; 8	21; 16

==== Greece vs Portugal ====
Greece
0
Athletic Hall Belgrade, Court 2
19 August 2022, 10:00 UTC+2

Portugal
5

			1	2	3
1	(Greece) (Portugal)	Evangelos-Stauros Anastasiou / Efthimia Papadopoulou; Mathias Rodrigues / Beatriz Roberto	9; 21	9; 21
2	(Greece) (Portugal)	Theodoros Papadopoulos; Santiago Batalha	12; 21	13; 21
3	(Greece) (Portugal)	Petra Zlatintsi; Madalena Fortunato	5; 21	8; 21
4	(Greece) (Portugal)	Georgios Gkiokas / Efthimios Koutsouris; Mathias Rodrigues / Goncalo Silva	11; 21	14; 21
5	(Greece) (Portugal)	Savvina Gialama / Aikaterini Spyridopoulou; Madalena Fortunato / Beatriz Roberto	10; 21	15; 21

==== Serbia vs Portugal ====
Serbia
3
Athletic Hall Belgrade, Court 1
20 August 2022, 18:00 UTC+2

Portugal
2

			1	2	3
1	(Serbia) (Portugal)	Sanja Perić; Madalena Fortunato	22; 20	17; 21	20; 22
2	(Serbia) (Portugal)	Viktor Petrović; Tiago Berenguer	21; 5	21; 16
3	(Serbia) (Portugal)	Sanja Perić / Andjela Vitman; Madalena Fortunato / Beatriz Roberto	20; 22	17; 21
4	(Serbia) (Portugal)	Igor Jovanović / Aleksandar Jovičić; Santiago Batalha / Mathias Rodrigues	21; 16	21; 18
5	(Serbia) (Portugal)	Viktor Petrović / Andjela Vitman; Goncalo Silva / Margarida Cabaco	21; 11	21; 7

==== Germany vs Greece ====
Germany
5
Athletic Hall Belgrade, Court 5
20 August 2022, 18:00 UTC+2

Greece
0

			1	2	3
1	(Germany) (Greece)	Jonathan Dresp / Elina Sonnenschein; Maximos Paloukas / Savvina Gialama	21; 3	21; 8
2	(Germany) (Greece)	Sanjeevi Padmanabhan Vasudevan; Theodoros Papadopoulos	21; 9	21; 13
3	(Germany) (Greece)	Antonia Schaller; Aikaterini Spyridopoulou	21; 10	21; 10
4	(Germany) (Greece)	Jonathan Dresp / Kenneth Neumann; Evangelos-Stauros Anastasiou / Efthimios Koutsouris	21; 3	21; 6
5	(Germany) (Greece)	Julia Meyer / Elina Sonnenschein; Stavriani Konstantina Pavlidou / Thomai Agapi Pavlidou	21; 8	21; 9

=== Group 4 ===
Pos	Team	Pld	W	L	MF	MA	MD	GF	GA	GD	PF	PA	PD	Pts	Qualification	Spain	Netherlands	Italy	Israel
1	Spain	3	3	0	11	4	+7	22	14	+8	682	602	+80	3	Advance to knockout stage	—	4–1	3–2	4–1
2	Netherlands	3	2	1	7	8	−1	17	18	−1	606	622	−16	2			—	3–2	3–2
3	Italy	3	1	2	7	8	−1	19	17	+2	649	613	+36	1				—	3–2
4	Israel	3	0	3	5	10	−5	13	22	−9	567	667	−100	0					—

Source: TS

==== Spain vs Italy ====
Spain
3
Athletic Hall Belgrade, Court 3
18 August 2022, 14:00 UTC+2

Italy
2

			1	2	3
1	(Spain) (Italy)	Daniel Franco; Alessandro Gozzini	21; 13	6; 21	21; 19
2	(Spain) (Italy)	Lucía Rodríguez; Gianna Stiglich	11; 21	21; 9	21; 16
3	(Spain) (Italy)	Rubén García / Rodrigo Sanjurjo; Alessandro Gozzini / Luca Zhou	16; 21	21; 23
4	(Spain) (Italy)	Ana Caballero / Nikol Carulla; Emma Piccinin / Gianna Stiglich	13; 21	18; 21
5	(Spain) (Italy)	Rubén García / Lucía Rodríguez; Luca Zhou / Anna Sofie De March	21; 10	21; 16

==== Netherlands vs Israel ====
Netherlands
3
Athletic Hall Belgrade, Court 4
18 August 2022, 14:00 UTC+2

Israel
2

			1	2	3
1	(Netherlands) (Israel)	Flora Wang; Anna Kirillova	8; 21	21; 16	13; 21
2	(Netherlands) (Israel)	Noah Haase; Idan Schneidman	21; 16	21; 13
3	(Netherlands) (Israel)	Kirsten de Wit / Meerte Loos; Zohar Amoyal / Alina Bergelson	21; 6	21; 7
4	(Netherlands) (Israel)	Casper Spaans / Joep Strooper; Mayan Mogilner / Amir Shapira	20; 22	19; 21
5	(Netherlands) (Israel)	Noah Haase / Kirsten de Wit; Mark Aronchik / Anna Kirillova	21; 11	21; 19

==== Spain vs Israel ====
Spain
4
Athletic Hall Belgrade, Court 3
19 August 2022, 10:00 UTC+2

Israel
1

			1	2	3
1	(Spain) (Israel)	Basilio Porto; Amir Shapira	12; 21	13; 21
2	(Spain) (Israel)	Cristina Teruel; Alina Bergelson	21; 16	20; 22	21; 13
3	(Spain) (Israel)	Daniel Franco / Rodrigo Sanjurjo; Mark Aronchik / Idan Schneidman	21; 16	19; 21	21; 13
4	(Spain) (Israel)	Nikol Carulla / Carmen María Jiménez; Zohar Amoyal / Adi Zorabovich	21; 18	21; 12
5	(Spain) (Israel)	Rubén García / Lucía Rodríguez; Mayan Mogilner / Anna Kirillova	21; 13	21; 15

==== Netherlands vs Italy ====
Netherlands
3
Athletic Hall Belgrade, Court 4
19 August 2022, 10:00 UTC+2

Italy
2

			1	2	3
1	(Netherlands) (Italy)	Noah Haase / Kirsten de Wit; Alessandro Gozzini / Emma Piccinin	21; 10	21; 15
2	(Netherlands) (Italy)	Stefanie Nijsse; Gianna Stiglich	9; 21	6; 21
3	(Netherlands) (Italy)	Noah Haase; Luca Zhou	16; 21	21; 15	21; 13
4	(Netherlands) (Italy)	Kirsten de Wit / Meerte Loos; Emma Piccinin / Gianna Stiglich	21; 17	18; 21	21; 14
5	(Netherlands) (Italy)	Casper Spaans / Joep Strooper; Alessandro Gozzini / Luca Zhou	15; 21	19; 21

==== Israel vs Italy ====
Israel
2
Athletic Hall Belgrade, Court 3
20 August 2022, 18:00 UTC+2

Italy
3

			1	2	3
1	(Israel) (Italy)	Mark Aronchik / Zohar Amoyal; Simone Piccinin / Anna Sofie De March	13; 21	21; 18	11; 21
2	(Israel) (Italy)	Idan Schneidman; Alessandro Gozzini	8; 21	11; 21
3	(Israel) (Italy)	Anna Kirillova; Gianna Stiglich	11; 21	15; 21
4	(Israel) (Italy)	Mayan Mogilner / Amir Shapira; Marco Danti / Simone Piccinin	19; 21	21; 16	21; 18
5	(Israel) (Italy)	Alina Bergelson / Anna Kirillova; Anna Sofie De March / Emma Piccinin	21; 16	21; 13

==== Spain vs Netherlands ====
Spain
4
Athletic Hall Belgrade, Court 4
20 August 2022, 18:00 UTC+2

Netherlands
1

			1	2	3
1	(Spain) (Netherlands)	Nikol Carulla; Flora Wang	21; 6	19; 21	21; 16
2	(Spain) (Netherlands)	Rubén García; Noah Haase	15; 21	19; 21
3	(Spain) (Netherlands)	Nikol Carulla / Lucía Rodríguez; Kirsten de Wit / Meerte Loos	21; 12	18; 21	21; 11
4	(Spain) (Netherlands)	Daniel Franco / Rodrigo Sanjurjo; Casper Spaans / Joep Strooper	21; 12	21; 15
5	(Spain) (Netherlands)	Rubén García / Lucía Rodríguez; Noah Haase / Kirsten de Wit	21; 15	21; 19

=== Group 5 ===
Pos	Team	Pld	W	L	MF	MA	MD	GF	GA	GD	PF	PA	PD	Pts	Qualification	Czech Republic	Poland	Estonia	Latvia
1	Czech Republic	3	3	0	13	2	+11	27	8	+19	692	496	+196	3	Advance to knockout stage	—	4–1	4–1	5–0
2	Poland	3	2	1	8	7	+1	20	16	+4	668	566	+102	2			—	3–2	4–1
3	Estonia	3	1	2	6	9	−3	15	18	−3	565	591	−26	1				—	3–2
4	Latvia	3	0	3	3	12	−9	6	26	−20	380	652	−272	0					—

Source: TS

==== Czech Republic vs Estonia ====
Czech Republic
4
Athletic Hall Belgrade, Court 1
18 August 2022, 18:00 UTC+2

Estonia
1

			1	2	3
1	(Czech Republic) (Estonia)	Dominik Kopřiva; Tauri Kilk	21; 17	21; 12
2	(Czech Republic) (Estonia)	Lucie Krulová; Marelle Salu	21; 7	21; 5
3	(Czech Republic) (Estonia)	Dominik Kopřiva / Adam Šulc; Mario Kirisma / Robin Schmalz	17; 21	21; 19	21; 16
4	(Czech Republic) (Estonia)	Lucie Krulová / Petra Maixnerová; Kadi Ilves / Marta Emili Teller	21; 8	21; 8
5	(Czech Republic) (Estonia)	Adam Šulc / Klára Šilhavá; Tauri Kilk / Elisaveta Berik	24; 26	11; 21

==== Latvia vs Poland ====
Latvia
1
Athletic Hall Belgrade, Court 2
18 August 2022, 18:00 UTC+2

Poland
4

			1	2	3
1	(Latvia) (Poland)	Edžus Meirāns / Annija Rulle-Titava; Maksymilian Danielak / Anna Czuchra	7; 21	6; 21
2	(Latvia) (Poland)	Toms Sala; Mateusz Golas	3; 21	7; 21
3	(Latvia) (Poland)	Anna Kupča; Maja Janko	13; 21	21; 16	21; 17
4	(Latvia) (Poland)	Edžus Meirāns / Davis Strazdins; Bartosz Krajewski / Dominik Kwinta	5; 21	13; 21
5	(Latvia) (Poland)	Anna Kupča / Annija Rulle-Titava; Julia Piwowar / Julia Stankiewicz	13; 21	10; 21

==== Czech Republic vs Poland ====
Czech Republic
4
Athletic Hall Belgrade, Court 3
19 August 2022, 14:00 UTC+2

Poland
1

			1	2	3
1	(Czech Republic) (Poland)	Adam Šulc / Kateřina Osladilová; Maksymilian Danielak / Julia Stankiewicz	14; 21	21; 15	21; 19
2	(Czech Republic) (Poland)	Dominik Kopřiva; Dominik Kwinta	21; 18	21; 23	10; 21
3	(Czech Republic) (Poland)	Petra Maixnerová; Maja Janko	21; 17	11; 21	21; 7
4	(Czech Republic) (Poland)	Dominik Kopřiva / Adam Šulc; Jan Franczak / Jan Wilczak	21; 11	21; 17
5	(Czech Republic) (Poland)	Lucie Krulová / Petra Maixnerová; Julia Piwowar / Julia Stankiewicz	17; 21	21; 15	21; 16

==== Latvia vs Estonia ====
Latvia
2
Athletic Hall Belgrade, Court 4
19 August 2022, 14:00 UTC+2

Estonia
3

			1	2	3
1	(Latvia) (Estonia)	Anna Kupča; Elisaveta Berik	21; 17	22; 20
2	(Latvia) (Estonia)	Davis Strazdins; Mario Kirisma	6; 21	10; 21
3	(Latvia) (Estonia)	Anna Kupča / Annija Rulle-Titava; Emili Pärsim / Marelle Salu	21; 14	20; 22	23; 21
4	(Latvia) (Estonia)	Edžus Meirāns / Toms Sala; Andrei Schmidt / Hugo Themas	8; 21	17; 21
5	(Latvia) (Estonia)	Davis Strazdins / Annija Rulle-Titava; Tauri Kilk / Elisaveta Berik	15; 21	4; 21

==== Poland vs Estonia ====
Poland
3
Athletic Hall Belgrade, Court 5
20 August 2022, 10:00 UTC+2

Estonia
2

			1	2	3
1	(Poland) (Estonia)	Mateusz Golas; Tauri Kilk	15; 21	19; 21
2	(Poland) (Estonia)	Maja Janko; Marelle Salu	21; 11	21; 16
3	(Poland) (Estonia)	Bartosz Krajewski / Dominik Kwinta; Mario Kirisma / Robin Schmalz	21; 23	21; 12	21; 16
4	(Poland) (Estonia)	Anna Czuchra / Aleksandra Weslawowicz; Katriin Jagomägi / Emili Pärsim	21; 11	21; 12
5	(Poland) (Estonia)	Jan Franczak / Julia Piwowar; Tauri Kilk / Elisaveta Berik	16; 21	7; 21

==== Czech Republic vs Latvia ====
Czech Republic
5
Athletic Hall Belgrade, Court 6
20 August 2022, 10:00 UTC+2

Latvia
0

			1	2	3
1	(Czech Republic) (Latvia)	Pavel Maňásek / Klára Šilhavá; Toms Sala / Annija Rulle-Titava	21; 3	21; 8
2	(Czech Republic) (Latvia)	Daniel Dvořák; Edžus Meirāns	21; 19	21; 10
3	(Czech Republic) (Latvia)	Petra Maixnerová; Arina Babre	21; 4	21; 13
4	(Czech Republic) (Latvia)	Dominik Kopřiva / David Smutný; Toms Sala / Davis Strazdins	21; 9	21; 9
5	(Czech Republic) (Latvia)	Kateřina Osladilová / Klára Šilhavá; Arina Babre / Annija Rulle-Titava	21; 7	21; 12

=== Group 6 ===
Pos	Team	Pld	W	L	MF	MA	MD	GF	GA	GD	PF	PA	PD	Pts	Qualification	Ukraine	Hungary	Romania	Croatia
1	Ukraine	3	3	0	14	1	+13	29	4	+25	660	418	+242	3	Advance to knockout stage	—	4–1	5–0	5–0
2	Hungary	3	2	1	9	6	+3	21	16	+5	695	640	+55	2			—	5–0	3–2
3	Romania	3	1	2	3	12	−9	10	25	−15	574	692	−118	1				—	3–2
4	Croatia	3	0	3	4	11	−7	9	24	−15	474	653	−179	0					—

Source: TS

==== Ukraine vs Romania ====
Ukraine
5
Athletic Hall Belgrade, Court 3
18 August 2022, 18:00 UTC+2

Romania
0

			1	2	3
1	(Ukraine) (Romania)	Mykhailo Vyshnevyi; Dinu Pandele	21; 8	21; 14
2	(Ukraine) (Romania)	Polina Buhrova; Laura Constantin	21; 10	21; 10
3	(Ukraine) (Romania)	Volodymyr Koluzaiev / Yevhenii Stolovoi; Rares Garalbatin / George Serbanescu	21; 14	21; 11
4	(Ukraine) (Romania)	Sofiia Lavrova / Yana Sobko; Anamaria Serban / Andra Stoica	21; 17	21; 19
5	(Ukraine) (Romania)	Nikita Yeromenko / Varvara Frolova; Luca-Stefan Pandele / Denisa-Maria Muscalu	21; 15	21; 11

==== Croatia vs Hungary ====
Croatia
2
Athletic Hall Belgrade, Court 4
18 August 2022, 18:00 UTC+2

Hungary
3

			1	2	3
1	(Croatia) (Hungary)	Roko Pipunić; Ádám Könczöl	10; 21	15; 21
2	(Croatia) (Hungary)	Jelena Buchberger; Tünde Takács	14; 21	12; 21
3	(Croatia) (Hungary)	Ivan Grubić / Ivor Zekan; Csanád Horváth / Kristóf Tóth	13; 21	13; 21
4	(Croatia) (Hungary)	Jelena Buchberger / Ana Pranić; Kata Kustán / Zsófi Szabó	27; 25	21; 13
5	(Croatia) (Hungary)	Ivor Zekan / Stella Balenović; Keán Gábor Kígyós / Nikol Szabina Vetor	21; 15	14; 21	21; 17

==== Ukraine vs Hungary ====
Ukraine
4
Athletic Hall Belgrade, Court 5
19 August 2022, 14:00 UTC+2

Hungary
1

			1	2	3
1	(Ukraine) (Hungary)	Nikita Yeromenko / Polina Buhrova; Keán Gábor Kígyós / Nikol Szabina Vetor	22; 20	21; 18
2	(Ukraine) (Hungary)	Mykhailo Vyshnevyi; Ádám Könczöl	9; 21	21; 19	22; 20
3	(Ukraine) (Hungary)	Polina Buhrova; Tünde Takács	21; 6	21; 8
4	(Ukraine) (Hungary)	Volodymyr Koluzaiev / Yevhenii Stolovoi; Keán Gábor Kígyós / Kristóf Tóth	12; 21	21; 15	11; 21
5	(Ukraine) (Hungary)	Yevheniia Kantemyr / Yana Sobko; Zsófi Szabó / Nikol Szabina Vetor	17; 21	21; 16	21; 9

==== Croatia vs Romania ====
Croatia
2
Athletic Hall Belgrade, Court 6
19 August 2022, 14:00 UTC+2

Romania
3

			1	2	3
1	(Croatia) (Romania)	Roko Pipunić / Jelena Buchberger; Dinu Pandele / Andra Stoica	21; 16	21; 18
2	(Croatia) (Romania)	Ivor Zekan; Luca-Stefan Pandele	16; 21	21; 10	23; 21
3	(Croatia) (Romania)	Ana Pranić; Andra Stoica	12; 21	16; 21
4	(Croatia) (Romania)	Roko Pipunić / Ivor Zekan; Dinu Pandele / Luca-Stefan Pandele	21; 10	23; 25	9; 21
5	(Croatia) (Romania)	Stella Balenović / Jelena Buchberger; Laura Constantin / Anamaria Serban	18; 21	18; 21

==== Hungary vs Romania ====
Hungary
5
Athletic Hall Belgrade, Court 1
20 August 2022, 10:00 UTC+2

Romania
0

			1	2	3
1	(Hungary) (Romania)	Keán Gábor Kígyós / Nikol Szabina Vetor; Luca-Stefan Pandele / Denisa-Maria Muscalu	21; 14	18; 21	21; 12
2	(Hungary) (Romania)	Kristóf Tóth; Dinu Pandele	21; 13	22; 20
3	(Hungary) (Romania)	Tünde Takács; Andra Stoica	21; 19	21; 15
4	(Hungary) (Romania)	Zsombor Ágai / Miklós Kis-Kasza; Dinu Pandele / Luca-Stefan Pandele	17; 21	21; 18	21; 12
5	(Hungary) (Romania)	Zsófi Szabó / Nikol Szabina Vetor; Laura Constantin / Anamaria Serban	15; 21	21; 12	23; 21

==== Ukraine vs Croatia ====
Ukraine
5
Athletic Hall Belgrade, Court 2
20 August 2022, 10:00 UTC+2

Croatia
0

			1	2	3
1	(Ukraine) (Croatia)	Mykhailo Vyshnevyi; Roko Pipunić	21; 8	21; 18
2	(Ukraine) (Croatia)	Sofiia Lavrova; Jelena Buchberger	21; 0	21; 0		retired
3	(Ukraine) (Croatia)	Oleksii Titov / Ivan Tsaregorotsev; Ivan Grubić / Ivor Zekan	21; 13	21; 7
4	(Ukraine) (Croatia)	Yevheniia Kantemyr / Yana Sobko; Jelena Buchberger / Ana Pranić	21; 0	21; 0		retired
5	(Ukraine) (Croatia)	Nikita Yeromenko / Varvara Frolova; Ivor Zekan / Stella Balenović	21; 15	21; 13

=== Group 7 ===
Pos	Team	Pld	W	L	MF	MA	MD	GF	GA	GD	PF	PA	PD	Pts	Qualification	Sweden	Switzerland	Austria	Slovakia
1	Sweden	3	3	0	11	4	+7	24	12	+12	708	624	+84	3	Advance to knockout stage	—	3–2	5–0	3–2
2	Switzerland	3	2	1	10	5	+5	23	13	+10	709	589	+120	2			—	3–2	5–0
3	Austria	3	1	2	6	9	−3	16	20	−4	646	688	−42	1				—	4–1
4	Slovakia	3	0	3	3	12	−9	8	26	−18	523	685	−162	0					—

Source: TS

==== Switzerland vs Slovakia ====
Switzerland
5
Athletic Hall Belgrade, Court 3
18 August 2022, 10:00 UTC+2

Slovakia
0

			1	2	3
1	(Switzerland) (Slovakia)	Nicolas Franconville / Vera Appenzeller; Sebastián Kadlec / Olívia Kadlecová	21; 13	21; 12
2	(Switzerland) (Slovakia)	Lorrain Joliat; Simeon Suchý	21; 7	21; 23	21; 13
3	(Switzerland) (Slovakia)	Lucie Amiguet; Johanka Ivanovičová	21; 10	21; 11
4	(Switzerland) (Slovakia)	Mathis Chanthakesone / Nicolas Franconville; Sebastián Kadlec / Richard Pavlik	21; 9	21; 11
5	(Switzerland) (Slovakia)	Lucie Amiguet / Vera Appenzeller; Olívia Kadlecová / Lea Výbochová	21; 16	21; 15

==== Sweden vs Austria ====
Sweden
5
Athletic Hall Belgrade, Court 4
18 August 2022, 10:00 UTC+2

Austria
0

			1	2	3
1	(Sweden) (Austria)	Mio Molin / Sofia Strömvall; Simon Bailoni / Lena Rumpold	21; 18	20; 22	21; 17
2	(Sweden) (Austria)	Romeo Makboul; Emil Dantler	21; 19	21; 11
3	(Sweden) (Austria)	Khushi Harakamani; Chiara Rudolf	21; 9	21; 14
4	(Sweden) (Austria)	Romeo Makboul / Mio Molin; Simon Bailoni / Ilija Nicolussi	27; 25	12; 21	21; 16
5	(Sweden) (Austria)	Elin Öhling / Elin Ryberg; Anja Rumpold / Lena Rumpold	21; 15	21; 16

==== Switzerland vs Austria ====
Switzerland
3
Athletic Hall Belgrade, Court 5
19 August 2022, 18:00 UTC+2

Austria
2

			1	2	3
1	(Switzerland) (Austria)	Nicolas Franconville / Vera Appenzeller; Simon Bailoni / Lena Rumpold	13; 21	19; 21
2	(Switzerland) (Austria)	Lorrain Joliat; Christian Tomic	21; 15	14; 21	25; 23
3	(Switzerland) (Austria)	Lucie Amiguet; Anja Rumpold	21; 13	21; 15
4	(Switzerland) (Austria)	Mathis Chanthakesone / Nicolas Franconville; Simon Bailoni / Ilija Nicolussi	18; 21	21; 17	19; 21
5	(Switzerland) (Austria)	Lucie Amiguet / Vera Appenzeller; Lena Krug / Chiara Rudolf	21; 7	21; 11

==== Sweden vs Slovakia ====
Sweden
3
Athletic Hall Belgrade, Court 6
19 August 2022, 18:00 UTC+2

Slovakia
2

			1	2	3
1	(Sweden) (Slovakia)	Eric Ramstedt; Richard Pavlik	21; 11	21; 10
2	(Sweden) (Slovakia)	Elin Öhling; Olívia Kadlecová	21; 10	21; 13
3	(Sweden) (Slovakia)	Victor Morskogen / Daniel Ström; Sebastián Kadlec / Simeon Suchý	21; 13	17; 21	21; 23
4	(Sweden) (Slovakia)	Amanda Magnusson / Elin Ryberg; Olívia Kadlecová / Lea Výbochová	19; 21	13; 21
5	(Sweden) (Slovakia)	Mio Molin / Sofia Strömvall; Simeon Suchý / Johanka Ivanovičová	21; 15	21; 19

==== Austria vs Slovakia ====
Austria
4
Athletic Hall Belgrade, Court 1
20 August 2022, 14:00 UTC+2

Slovakia
1

			1	2	3
1	(Austria) (Slovakia)	Simon Bailoni / Lena Rumpold; Sebastián Kadlec / Olívia Kadlecová	21; 18	21; 10
2	(Austria) (Slovakia)	Emil Dantler; Simeon Suchý	22; 20	21; 18
3	(Austria) (Slovakia)	Anja Rumpold; Lea Výbochová	16; 21	22; 20	21; 19
4	(Austria) (Slovakia)	Simon Bailoni / Ilija Nicolussi; Sebastián Kadlec / Simeon Suchý	21; 8	21; 15
5	(Austria) (Slovakia)	Sarah Dlapka / Lena Rumpold; Olívia Kadlecová / Lea Výbochová	16; 21	21; 15	14; 21

==== Switzerland vs Sweden ====
Switzerland
2
Athletic Hall Belgrade, Court 2
20 August 2022, 14:00 UTC+2

Sweden
3

			1	2	3
1	(Switzerland) (Sweden)	Nicolas Franconville / Vera Appenzeller; Mio Molin / Sofia Strömvall	18; 21	21; 17	26; 28
2	(Switzerland) (Sweden)	Lorrain Joliat; Romeo Makboul	13; 21	13; 21
3	(Switzerland) (Sweden)	Lucie Amiguet; Elin Ryberg	21; 13	21; 8
4	(Switzerland) (Sweden)	Mathis Chanthakesone / Nicolas Franconville; Romeo Makboul / Mio Molin	18; 21	23; 21	16; 21
5	(Switzerland) (Sweden)	Lucie Amiguet / Vera Appenzeller; Elin Öhling / Elin Ryberg	12; 21	21; 19	21; 11

=== Group 8 ===
Pos	Team	Pld	W	L	MF	MA	MD	GF	GA	GD	PF	PA	PD	Pts	Qualification	England	Bulgaria	Lithuania	Norway
1	England	3	3	0	14	1	+13	29	3	+26	655	374	+281	3	Advance to knockout stage	—	4–1	5–0	5–0
2	Bulgaria	3	2	1	7	8	−1	16	18	−2	550	597	−47	2			—	3–2	3–2
3	Lithuania	3	1	2	5	10	−5	12	22	−10	536	652	−116	1				—	3–2
4	Norway	3	0	3	4	11	−7	9	23	−14	490	608	−118	0					—

Source: TS

==== England vs Lithuania ====
England
5
Athletic Hall Belgrade, Court 5
18 August 2022, 18:00 UTC+2

Lithuania
0

			1	2	3
1	(England) (Lithuania)	Oliver Butler / Estelle van Leeuwen; Vilius Bagdanavičius / Viltė Paulauskaitė	21; 13	21; 19
2	(England) (Lithuania)	Nadeem Dalvi; Domas Paksys	21; 13	21; 7
3	(England) (Lithuania)	Lisa Curtin; Viltė Paulauskaitė	21; 12	21; 18
4	(England) (Lithuania)	Oliver Butler / Blake Hoang; Vilius Bagdanavičius / Azuolas Barkauskas	21; 7	21; 10
5	(England) (Lithuania)	Lisa Curtin / Estelle van Leeuwen; Jogailė Kelečiūtė / Monika Sukackaite	21; 11	21; 13

==== Norway vs Bulgaria ====
Norway
2
Athletic Hall Belgrade, Court 6
18 August 2022, 18:00 UTC+2

Bulgaria
3

			1	2	3
1	(Norway) (Bulgaria)	Mathias Hong / Katja Ellingsen; Stanimir Terziev / Tsvetina Popivanova	21; 12	21; 15
2	(Norway) (Bulgaria)	Kristine Ødegårdstuen; Kaloyana Nalbantova	7; 21	7; 21
3	(Norway) (Bulgaria)	Thomas Barth; Stanimir Terziev	15; 21	17; 21
4	(Norway) (Bulgaria)	Kristine Ødegårdstuen / Katja Ellingsen; Mihaela Chepisheva / Tsvetina Popivanova	20; 22	15; 21
5	(Norway) (Bulgaria)	Thomas Fjeldheim / Mathias Hong; Aleksander Petrov / Krasimir Todorov	21; 16	21; 12

==== England vs Bulgaria ====
England
4
Athletic Hall Belgrade, Court 1
19 August 2022, 14:00 UTC+2

Bulgaria
1

			1	2	3
1	(England) (Bulgaria)	Oliver Butler / Estelle van Leeuwen; Stefan Zeirov / Yoanna Yordanova	21; 3	21; 2
2	(England) (Bulgaria)	Nadeem Dalvi; Stanimir Terziev	21; 5	21; 8
3	(England) (Bulgaria)	Lisa Curtin; Kaloyana Nalbantova	15; 21	21; 10	15; 21
4	(England) (Bulgaria)	Oliver Butler / Blake Hoang; Yavor Hristov / Georgi Kirov	21; 14	21; 9
5	(England) (Bulgaria)	Lisa Curtin / Estelle van Leeuwen; Mihaela Chepisheva / Kaloyana Nalbantova	21; 15	16; 21	21; 12

==== Norway vs Lithuania ====
Norway
2
Athletic Hall Belgrade, Court 2
19 August 2022, 14:00 UTC+2

Lithuania
3

			1	2	3
1	(Norway) (Lithuania)	Thomas Barth; Vilius Bagdanavičius	12; 21	21; 19	21; 8
2	(Norway) (Lithuania)	Kristine Ødegårdstuen; Viltė Paulauskaitė	16; 21	13; 21
3	(Norway) (Lithuania)	Thomas Fjeldheim / Mathias Hong; Azuolas Barkauskas / Domas Paksys	21; 12	21; 14
4	(Norway) (Lithuania)	Kristine Ødegårdstuen / Katja Ellingsen; Jogailė Kelečiūtė / Monika Sukackaite	17; 21	21; 16	17; 21
5	(Norway) (Lithuania)	Mathias Hong / Katja Ellingsen; Vilius Bagdanavičius / Viltė Paulauskaitė	17; 21	18; 21

==== Bulgaria vs Lithuania ====
Bulgaria
3
Athletic Hall Belgrade, Court 3
20 August 2022, 10:00 UTC+2

Lithuania
2

			1	2	3
1	(Bulgaria) (Lithuania)	Stanimir Terziev; Domas Paksys	21; 11	23; 25	15; 21
2	(Bulgaria) (Lithuania)	Kaloyana Nalbantova; Jogailė Kelečiūtė	21; 6	21; 7
3	(Bulgaria) (Lithuania)	Aleksander Petrov / Krasimir Todorov; Vilius Bagdanavičius / Domas Paksys	15; 21	9; 21
4	(Bulgaria) (Lithuania)	Mihaela Chepisheva / Tsvetina Popivanova; Viltė Paulauskaitė / Monika Sukackaite	18; 21	21; 16	21; 19
5	(Bulgaria) (Lithuania)	Stanimir Terziev / Kaloyana Nalbantova; Vilius Bagdanavičius / Viltė Paulauskaitė	21; 16	21; 13

==== England vs Norway ====
England
5
Athletic Hall Belgrade, Court 4
20 August 2022, 10:00 UTC+2

Norway
0

			1	2	3
1	(England) (Norway)	Oliver Butler / Lisa Curtin; Thomas Fjeldheim / Kristine Ødegårdstuen	21; 12	21; 12
2	(England) (Norway)	Nadeem Dalvi; Andreas Holmedal	21; 16	21; 4
3	(England) (Norway)	Leona Lee; Katja Ellingsen	21; 11	21; 9
4	(England) (Norway)	Oliver Butler / Jia Bin Lee; Thomas Fjeldheim / Mathias Hong	21; 14	21; 15
5	(England) (Norway)	Lisa Curtin / Leona Lee; Maja Kragholm / Stine Pedersen	21; 7	21; 10

=== Knockout stage ===
Quarter-finals
France	3
Sweden	1
Spain	3
Czech Republic	1
Ukraine	3
Germany	0
England	0
Denmark	3

Semi-finals
France	3
Spain	2
Ukraine	1
Denmark	3

Final
France	1
Denmark	3

=== Quarter-finals ===
==== France vs Sweden ====
France
3
Athletic Hall Belgrade, Court 1
21 August 2022, 10:00 UTC+2

Sweden
1

			1	2	3
1	(France) (Sweden)	Lucas Renoir / Téa Margueritte; Mio Molin / Sofia Strömvall	21; 13	21; 12
2	(France) (Sweden)	Alex Lanier; Romeo Makboul	21; 12	21; 12
3	(France) (Sweden)	Emilie Drouin; Elin Öhling	21; 10	10; 21	13; 21
4	(France) (Sweden)	Maël Cattoen / Lucas Renoir; Romeo Makboul / Mio Molin	21; 23	21; 16	21; 15
5	(France) (Sweden)	Emilie Drouin / Téa Margueritte; Elin Öhling / Elin Ryberg				not played

==== Spain vs Czech Republic ====
Spain
3
Athletic Hall Belgrade, Court 4
21 August 2022, 10:00 UTC+2

Czech Republic
1

			1	2	3
1	(Spain) (Czech Republic)	Rubén García / Nikol Carulla; Adam Šulc / Kateřina Osladilová	21; 15	21; 12
2	(Spain) (Czech Republic)	Rodrigo Sanjurjo; Dominik Kopřiva	20; 22	15; 21
3	(Spain) (Czech Republic)	Lucía Rodríguez; Lucie Krulová	22; 20	24; 22
4	(Spain) (Czech Republic)	Daniel Franco / Rubén García; Dominik Kopřiva / Adam Šulc	21; 12	19; 21	21; 18
5	(Spain) (Czech Republic)	Nikol Carulla / Lucía Rodríguez; Lucie Krulová / Petra Maixnerová				not played

==== Ukraine vs Germany ====
Ukraine
3
Athletic Hall Belgrade, Court 6
21 August 2022, 10:00 UTC+2

Germany
0

			1	2	3
1	(Ukraine) (Germany)	Polina Buhrova; Antonia Schaller	21; 9	21; 18
2	(Ukraine) (Germany)	Mykhailo Vyshnevyi; Karim Krehemeier	22; 20	21; 10
3	(Ukraine) (Germany)	Polina Buhrova / Varvara Frolova; Selin Hübsch / Julia Meyer	16; 21	21; 16	21; 18
4	(Ukraine) (Germany)	Volodymyr Koluzaiev / Nikita Yeromenko; Jonathan Dresp / Kenneth Neumann				not played
5	(Ukraine) (Germany)	Yevhenii Stolovoi / Yevheniia Kantemyr; Jarne Schlevoigt / Julia Meyer				not played

==== England vs Denmark ====
England
0
Athletic Hall Belgrade, Court 2
21 August 2022, 10:00 UTC+2

Denmark
3

			1	2	3
1	(England) (Denmark)	Oliver Butler / Estelle van Leeuwen; Christian Faust Kjær / Emma Irring Braüner	18; 21	12; 21
2	(England) (Denmark)	Nadeem Dalvi; William Bøgebjerg	21; 13	13; 21	18; 21
3	(England) (Denmark)	Lisa Curtin; Benedicte Sillassen	10; 21	10; 21
4	(England) (Denmark)	Oliver Butler / Nadeem Dalvi; Jakob Houe / Christian Faust Kjær				not played
5	(England) (Denmark)	Lisa Curtin / Estelle van Leeuwen; Benedicte Sillassen / Maria Højlund Tommerup				not played

=== Semi-finals ===
==== France vs Spain ====
France
3
Athletic Hall Belgrade, Court 1
21 August 2022, 16:00 UTC+2

Spain
2

			1	2	3
1	(France) (Spain)	Alex Lanier / Téa Margueritte; Rubén García / Nikol Carulla	21; 10	21; 17
2	(France) (Spain)	Malya Hoareau; Lucía Rodríguez	17; 21	8; 21
3	(France) (Spain)	Alex Lanier; Ricardo Rettig	21; 6	21; 6
4	(France) (Spain)	Emilie Drouin / Téa Margueritte; Nikol Carulla / Lucía Rodríguez	21; 14	15; 21	15; 21
5	(France) (Spain)	Maël Cattoen / Lucas Renoir; Daniel Franco / Rubén García	21; 13	21; 12

==== Ukraine vs Denmark ====
Ukraine
1
Athletic Hall Belgrade, Court 2
21 August 2022, 16:00 UTC+2

Denmark
3

			1	2	3
1	(Ukraine) (Denmark)	Mykhailo Vyshnevyi; Christian Faust Kjær	21; 18	14; 21	13; 21
2	(Ukraine) (Denmark)	Polina Buhrova; Benedicte Sillassen	21; 12	21; 14
3	(Ukraine) (Denmark)	Volodymyr Koluzaiev / Nikita Yeromenko; Jakob Houe / Christian Faust Kjær	5; 21	12; 21
4	(Ukraine) (Denmark)	Yevheniia Kantemyr / Sofiia Lavrova; Frederikke Østergaard / Maria Højlund Tommerup	19; 21	20; 22
5	(Ukraine) (Denmark)	Oleksii Titov / Varvara Frolova; Hjalte Johansen / Emma Irring Braüner				not played

=== Final ===
==== France vs Denmark ====
France
1
Athletic Hall Belgrade, Court 1
22 August 2022, 09:00 UTC+2

Denmark
3

			1	2	3
1	(France) (Denmark)	Alex Lanier; Jakob Houe	21; 9	21; 15
2	(France) (Denmark)	Emilie Drouin; Benedicte Sillassen	13; 21	10; 21
3	(France) (Denmark)	Maël Cattoen / Lucas Renoir; Jakob Houe / Christian Faust Kjær	19; 21	10; 21
4	(France) (Denmark)	Elsa Jacob / Camille Pognante; Benedicte Sillassen / Maria Højlund Tommerup	17; 21	21; 17	19; 21
5	(France) (Denmark)	Alex Lanier / Téa Margueritte; Christian Faust Kjær / Emma Irring Braüner				not played
