= Italy national badminton team =

National badminton team representing Italy

Italy
- Association: Federazione Italiana Badminton (FIBa)
- Confederation: BE (Europe)
- President: Carlo Beninati

BWF ranking
- Current ranking: 46 ▼6 (2 January 2024)
- Highest ranking: 27 (2 July 2015)

Sudirman Cup
- Appearances: 7 (first in 1991)
- Best result: Group stage

European Mixed Team Championships
- Appearances: 10 (first in 1978)
- Best result: Group stage

European Men's Team Championships
- Appearances: 7 (first in 2006)
- Best result: Group stage

European Women's Team Championships
- Appearances: 3 (first in 2006)
- Best result: Group stage

Helvetia Cup
- Appearances: 9 (first in 1979)
- Best result: 8th (1999)

The Italy national badminton team (Italian: Nazionale Italiana di badminton) represents Italy in international badminton team competitions and is controlled by the Italian Badminton Federation (Italian: Federazione Italiana Badminton). The Italian national team competed in the Sudirman Cup but have never once qualified for the Thomas Cup and the Uber Cup.

The national team competed in the European Men's and Women's Team Badminton Championships and the European Mixed Team Badminton Championships but have never got pass the group stage. The Italian team also competed in the Mediterranean Games and has won a few medals in badminton at the Games.

== Competitive record ==
=== Thomas Cup ===
Year	Round	Pos
1949	Did not enter	
1952	Did not enter	
1955	Did not enter	
1958	Did not enter	
1961	Did not enter	
1964	Did not enter	
1967	Did not enter	
1970	Did not enter	
1973	Did not enter	
1976	Did not enter	
1979	Did not enter	
1982	Did not enter	
1984	Did not enter	
1986	Did not enter	
1988	Did not enter	
1990	Did not qualify	
1992	Did not qualify	
1994	Did not qualify	
1996	Did not qualify	
1998	Did not qualify	
2000	Did not enter	
2002	Did not enter	
2004	Did not enter	
2006	Did not qualify	
2008	Did not qualify	
2010	Did not qualify	
2012	Did not qualify	
2014	Did not qualify	
2016	Did not qualify	
2018	Did not qualify	
2020	Did not qualify	
2022	Did not enter	
2024	Did not enter	
2026	Did not qualify	
2028	To be determined	
2030	To be determined	

=== Uber Cup ===
Year	Round	Pos
1957	Did not enter	
1960	Did not enter	
1963	Did not enter	
1966	Did not enter	
1969	Did not enter	
1972	Did not enter	
1975	Did not enter	
1978	Did not enter	
1981	Did not enter	
1984	Did not enter	
1986	Did not enter	
1988	Did not enter	
1990	Did not qualify	
1992	Did not qualify	
1994	Did not qualify	
1996	Did not qualify	
1998	Did not qualify	
2000	Did not enter	
2002	Did not enter	
2004	Did not enter	
2006	Did not qualify	
2008	Did not qualify	
2010	Did not enter	
2012	Did not qualify	
2014	Did not enter	
2016	Did not qualify	
2018	Did not enter	
2020	Did not enter	
2022	Did not enter	
2024	Did not enter	
2026	Did not qualify	
2028	To be determined	
2030	To be determined	

=== Sudirman Cup ===
Year	Round	Pos
1989	Did not enter	
1991	Group stage	34th
1993	Did not enter	
1995	Group stage	44th
1997	Group stage	47th
1999	Did not enter	
2001	Group stage	47th
2003	Did not enter	
2005	Group stage	33rd
2007	Group stage	27th
2009	Did not enter	
2011	Did not enter	
2013	Did not enter	
2015	Group stage	28th
2017	Did not enter	
2019	Did not enter	
2021	Did not enter	
2023	Did not enter	
2025	Did not enter	
2027	To be determined	
2029	To be determined	

=== European Team Championships ===
==== Men's team ====
Year	Round	Pos
2006	Group stage	17/24
2008	Group stage	17/24
2010	Group stage	19/24
2012	Group stage	9/16
2014	Group stage	13/18
2016	Group stage	19/24
2018	Group stage	15/21
2020	Group stage	17/24
2024	Did not qualify	
2026	Did not qualify	
2028	To be determined	
2030	To be determined	

==== Women's team ====
Year	Round	Pos
2006	Group stage	8/14
2008	Group stage	15/21
2010	Did not enter	
2012	Group stage	25/29
2014	Did not enter	
2016	Group stage	16/19
2018	Did not enter	
2020	Did not enter	
2024	Did not qualify	
2026	Did not qualify	
2028	To be determined	
2030	To be determined	

==== Mixed team ====
Year	Round	Pos
1972	Did not enter	
1974	Did not enter	
1976	Did not enter	
1978	Group stage	15th
1980	Group stage	21st
1982	Group stage	20th
1984	Group stage	19th
1986	Group stage	21st
1988	Group stage	23rd
1990	Group stage	22nd
1992	Group stage	23rd
1994	Did not qualify	
1996	Did not qualify	
1998	Did not qualify	
2000	Did not qualify	
2002	Did not qualify	
2004	Did not qualify	
2006	Did not qualify	
2008	Did not qualify	
2009	Group stage	17/24
2011	Group stage	25/32
2013	Did not enter	
2015	Did not qualify	
2017	Did not qualify	
2019	Did not qualify	
2021	Did not qualify	
2023	Did not qualify	
2025	Did not qualify	
2027	To be determined	
2029	To be determined	

=== Helvetia Cup ===
Year	Round	Pos
1962	Did not enter	
1963	Did not enter	
1964	Did not enter	
1965	Did not enter	
1966	Did not enter	
1967	Did not enter	
1968	Did not enter	
1969	Did not enter	
1970	Did not enter	
1971	Did not enter	
1973	Did not enter	
1975	Did not enter	
1977	Did not enter	
1979	Group stage	17th
1981	Did not enter	
1983	Did not enter	
1985	Did not enter	
1987	Did not enter	
1989	Group stage	15th
1991	Group stage	10th
1993	Group stage	16th
1995	Group stage	12th
1997	Group stage	11th
1999	Group stage	8th
2001	Did not enter	
2003	Did not enter	
2005	Group stage	19th
2007	Group stage	11th

=== Plume d'Or ===
Year	Round	Pos
1972	Did not enter	
1973	Did not enter	
1974	Did not enter	
1976	Did not enter	
1977	Did not enter	
1978	Did not enter	
1979	Seventh place	7th
1980	Did not enter	
1981	Did not enter	
1982	Did not enter	
1984	Did not enter	
1985	Did not enter	
1986	Did not enter	
1987	Did not enter	
1988	Did not enter	
1989	Did not enter	
1990	Did not enter	
1991	Did not enter	
1992	Did not enter	
1993	Did not enter	
1994	Did not enter	

== Junior competitive record ==
=== Suhandinata Cup ===
Year	Round	Pos
2000	Group stage	15th
2002	Did not enter	
2004	Did not enter	
2006	Did not enter	
2007	Did not enter	
2008	Did not enter	
2009	Did not enter	
2010	Did not enter	
2011	Did not enter	
2012	Did not enter	
2013	Did not enter	
2014	Did not enter	
2015	Group stage	34th
2016	Did not enter	
2017	Did not enter	
2018	Did not enter	
2019	Did not enter	
2022	Did not enter	
2023	Did not enter	
2024	Did not enter	
2025	To be determined	

=== European Junior Team Championships ===
==== Mixed team ====
Year	Round	Pos
1975	Did not enter	
1977	Did not enter	
1979	Group stage	19th
1981	Group stage	19th
1983	Did not enter	
1985	Group stage	21st
1987	Group stage	20th
1989	Group stage	21st
1991	Group stage	24th
1993	Did not enter	
1995	Did not enter	
1997	Did not enter	
1999	Did not enter	
2001	Did not enter	
2003	Did not enter	
2005	Did not enter	
2007	Did not enter	
2009	Group stage	22/28
2011	Did not enter	
2013	Did not enter	
2015	Group stage	25/32
2017	Did not enter	
2018	Group stage	9/16
2020	Group stage	9/12
2022	Group stage	17/24
2024	Group stage	17/24

=== Finlandia Cup ===
Year	Round	Pos
1984	Did not enter	
1986	Did not enter	
1988	Did not enter	
1990	Group stage	16th
1992	Group stage	18th
1994	Did not enter	
1996	Group stage	13th
1998	Group stage	14th
2000	Did not enter	
2002	Did not enter	
2004	Group stage	21st
2006	Did not enter	

== Players ==
=== Current squad ===
As of 2 January 2024

==== Men's team ====
Name	DoB/Age	Ranking of event		
Name	DoB/Age	MS	MD	XD
Giovanni Toti	28 December 2000 (age 25)	66	1335	-
Fabio Caponio	26 March 1999 (age 26)	89	1335	-
Christopher Vittoriani	25 March 2003 (age 22)	124	-	-
Enrico Baroni	20 May 2001 (age 24)	323	-	-
Matteo Massetti	3 July 2002 (age 23)	-	286	-
David Salutt	31 December 1998 (age 27)	-	286	396

==== Women's team ====
Name	DoB/Age	Ranking of event		
Name	DoB/Age	WS	WD	XD
Katharina Fink	14 December 2002 (age 23)	251	400	-
Yasmine Hamza	16 September 2003 (age 22)	111	400	1160
Judith Mair	13 September 2002 (age 23)	144	104	-
Martina Corsini	30 January 2002 (age 24)	-	104	148
Gianna Stiglich	6 December 2005 (age 20)	189	745	-
Emma Piccinin	19 September 2004 (age 21)	827	581	-
