= 2020 European Women's Team Badminton Championships group stage =

First stage of the 2020 European Women's Team Badminton Championships

This article lists the full results for group stage of 2020 European Women's Team Badminton Championships. All times are Central European Time (UTC+01:00).

== Group 1 ==
=== Denmark vs. Netherlands ===
Denmark
5
Arena Stade Couvert, Court 1
11 February 2020 16:00

Netherlands
0

			1	2	3
1	(Denmark) (Netherlands)	Mia Blichfeldt; Soraya de Visch Eijbergen	21; 14	21; 19
2	(Denmark) (Netherlands)	Maiken Fruergaard / Sara Thygesen; Selena Piek / Cheryl Seinen	21; 17	21; 15
3	(Denmark) (Netherlands)	Julie Dawall Jakobsen; Gayle Mahulette	21; 10	21; 16
4	(Denmark) (Netherlands)	Amalie Magelund / Freja Ravn; Debora Jille / Alyssa Tirtosentono	21; 12	21; 15
5	(Denmark) (Netherlands)	Line Christophersen; Nadia Choukri	21; 14	22; 20

=== Ireland vs. Estonia ===
Ireland
1
Arena Stade Couvert, Court 7
11 February 2020 16:00

Estonia
4

			1	2	3
1	(Republic of Ireland) (Estonia)	Rachael Darragh; Kristin Kuuba	16; 21	8; 21
2	(Republic of Ireland) (Estonia)	Kate Frost; Getter Saar	23; 21	14; 21	11; 21
3	(Republic of Ireland) (Estonia)	Sara Boyle; Kati-Kreet Marran	17; 21	16; 21
4	(Republic of Ireland) (Estonia)	Kate Frost / Moya Ryan; Kristin Kuuba / Kati-Kreet Marran	16; 21	19; 21
5	(Republic of Ireland) (Estonia)	Sara Boyle / Rachael Darragh; Catlyn Kruus / Ramona Üprus	21; 18	21; 18

=== Denmark vs. Ireland ===
Denmark
5
Arena Stade Couvert, Court 8
12 February 2020 16:00

Ireland
0

			1	2	3
1	(Denmark) (Republic of Ireland)	Julie Dawall Jakobsen; Rachael Darragh	21; 12	21; 11
2	(Denmark) (Republic of Ireland)	Line Christophersen; Kate Frost	21; 10	21; 9
3	(Denmark) (Republic of Ireland)	Mette Poulsen; Sara Boyle	19; 21	21; 15	21; 17
4	(Denmark) (Republic of Ireland)	Alexandra Bøje / Mette Poulsen; Kate Frost / Moya Ryan	21; 10	21; 5
5	(Denmark) (Republic of Ireland)	Amalie Magelund / Freja Ravn; Sara Boyle / Rachael Darragh	21; 10	21; 10

=== Netherlands vs. Estonia ===
Netherlands
2
Arena Stade Couvert, Court 10
12 February 2020 16:00

Estonia
3

			1	2	3
1	(Netherlands) (Estonia)	Soraya de Visch Eijbergen; Kristin Kuuba	18; 21	20; 22
2	(Netherlands) (Estonia)	Gayle Mahulette; Getter Saar	6; 4			retired
3	(Netherlands) (Estonia)	Nadia Choukri; Kati-Kreet Marran	23; 25	13; 21
4	(Netherlands) (Estonia)	Debora Jille / Cheryl Seinen; Catlyn Kruus / Ramona Üprus	21; 8	21; 9
5	(Netherlands) (Estonia)	Alyssa Tirtosentono / Imke van der Aar; Kristin Kuuba / Kati-Kreet Marran	19; 21	16; 21

=== Denmark vs. Estonia ===
Denmark
5
Arena Stade Couvert, Court 1
13 February 2020 14:00

Estonia
0

			1	2	3
1	(Denmark) (Estonia)	Mia Blichfeldt; Kristin Kuuba	21; 19	22; 20
2	(Denmark) (Estonia)	Julie Dawall Jakobsen; Kati-Kreet Marran	21; 11	21; 13
3	(Denmark) (Estonia)	Line Christophersen; Catlyn Kruus	21; 7	21; 10
4	(Denmark) (Estonia)	Maiken Fruergaard / Sara Thygesen; Kristin Kuuba / Kati-Kreen Marran	21; 11	21; 11
5	(Denmark) (Estonia)	Alexandra Bøje / Mette Poulsen; Catlyn Kruus / Ramona Üprus	21; 10	21; 6

=== Netherlands vs. Ireland ===
Netherlands
5
Arena Stade Couvert, Court 8
13 February 2020 14:00

Ireland
0

			1	2	3
1	(Netherlands) (Republic of Ireland)	Soraya de Visch Eijbergen; Rachael Darragh	21; 18	21; 10
2	(Netherlands) (Republic of Ireland)	Gayle Mahulette; Kate Frost	23; 21	21; 11
3	(Netherlands) (Republic of Ireland)	Nadia Choukri; Sara Boyle	21; 16	18; 21	21; 9
4	(Netherlands) (Republic of Ireland)	Selena Piek / Cheryl Seinen; Kate Frost / Moya Ryan	21; 15	21; 10
5	(Netherlands) (Republic of Ireland)	Debora Jille / Alyssa Tirtosentono; Sara Boyle / Rachael Darragh	3; 1			retired

== Group 2 ==
=== Iceland vs. Lithuania ===
Iceland
1
Arena Stade Couvert, Court 4
11 February 2020 12:00

Lithuania
4

			1	2	3
1	(Iceland) (Lithuania)	Sigríður Árnadóttir; Vytautė Fomkinaitė	17; 21	8; 21
2	(Iceland) (Lithuania)	Sólrún Anna Ingvarsdóttir; Gerda Voitechovskaja	12; 21	10; 21
3	(Iceland) (Lithuania)	Arna Karen Jóhannsdóttir; Samanta Golubickaite	10; 21	14; 21
4	(Iceland) (Lithuania)	Sigríður Árnadóttir / Erla Björg Hafsteinsdóttir; Vytautė Fomkinaitė / Gerda Voitechovskaja	18; 21	14; 21
5	(Iceland) (Lithuania)	Sólrún Anna Ingvarsdóttir / Arna Karen Jóhannsdóttir; Rebeka Alekseviciute / Samanta Golubickaite	17; 21	21; 10	21; 15

=== Russia vs. Belgium ===
Russia
5
Arena Stade Couvert, Court 3
11 February 2020 12:00

Belgium
0

			1	2	3
1	(Russia) (Belgium)	Evgeniya Kosetskaya; Lianne Tan	21; 10	17; 21	21; 12
2	(Russia) (Belgium)	Natalia Perminova; Clara Lassaux	21; 15	21; 19
3	(Russia) (Belgium)	Mariia Golubeva; Joke de Langhe	21; 16	21; 12
4	(Russia) (Belgium)	Anastasiia Akchurina / Olga Morozova; Lise Jaques / Flore Vandenhoucke	22; 20	21; 17
5	(Russia) (Belgium)	Alina Davletova / Nina Vislova; Joke de Langhe / Lien Lammertyn	21; 15	21; 10

=== Russia vs. Iceland ===
Russia
5
Arena Stade Couvert, Court 4
12 February 2020 09:00

Iceland
0

			1	2	3
1	(Russia) (Iceland)	Evgeniya Kosetskaya; Sigríður Árnadóttir	21; 3	21; 3
2	(Russia) (Iceland)	Viktoriia Kozyreva; Sólrún Anna Ingvarsdóttir	21; 11	21; 12
3	(Russia) (Iceland)	Mariia Golubeva; Arna Karen Jóhannsdóttir	21; 12	21; 16
4	(Russia) (Iceland)	Ekaterina Bolotova / Alina Davletova; Erla Björg Hafsteinsdóttir / Sólrún Anna Ingvarsdóttir	21; 7	21; 7
5	(Russia) (Iceland)	Anastasiia Akchurina / Olga Morozova; Sigríður Árnadóttir / Arna Karen Jóhannsdóttir	21; 14	21; 12

=== Belgium vs. Lithuania ===
Belgium
5
Arena Stade Couvert, Court 8
12 February 2020 09:00

Lithuania
0

			1	2	3
1	(Belgium) (Lithuania)	Lianne Tan; Vytautė Fomkinaitė	21; 6	21; 14
2	(Belgium) (Lithuania)	Clara Lassaux; Gerda Voitechovskaja	17; 21	21; 16	21; 16
3	(Belgium) (Lithuania)	Flore Vandenhoucke; Samanta Golubickaite	19; 21	21; 16	21; 16
4	(Belgium) (Lithuania)	Lise Jaques / Flore Vandenhoucke; Vytautė Fomkinaitė / Gerda Voitechovskaja	21; 14	21; 8
5	(Belgium) (Lithuania)	Joke de Langhe / Lien Lammertyn; Rebeka Alekseviciute / Samanta Golubickaite	21; 14	21; 16

=== Belgium vs. Iceland ===
Belgium
4
Arena Stade Couvert, Court 7
13 February 2020 10:00

Iceland
1

			1	2	3
1	(Belgium) (Iceland)	Lianne Tan; Sigríður Árnadóttir	21; 6	21; 10
2	(Belgium) (Iceland)	Clara Lassaux; Sólrún Anna Ingvarsdóttir	21; 15	21; 11
3	(Belgium) (Iceland)	Lien Lammertyn; Arna Karen Jóhannsdóttir	21; 17	21; 6
4	(Belgium) (Iceland)	Lise Jaques / Flore Vandenhoucke; Sigríður Árnadóttir / Sólrún Anna Ingvarsdóttir	21; 13	21; 10
5	(Belgium) (Iceland)	Joke de Langhe / Lien Lammertyn; Erla Björg Hafsteinsdóttir / Arna Karen Jóhannsdóttir	17; 21	21; 13	18; 21

=== Russia vs. Lithuania ===
Russia
5
Arena Stade Couvert, Court 9
13 February 2020 10:00

Lithuania
0

			1	2	3
1	(Russia) (Lithuania)	Evgeniya Kosetskaya; Vytautė Fomkinaitė	21; 6	21; 6
2	(Russia) (Lithuania)	Viktoriia Kozyreva; Gerda Voitechovskaja	21; 19	21; 18
3	(Russia) (Lithuania)	Mariia Golubeva; Samanta Golubickaite	21; 6	21; 7
4	(Russia) (Lithuania)	Ekaterina Bolotova / Alina Davletova; Vytautė Fomkinaitė / Gerda Voitechovskaja	21; 9	21; 9
5	(Russia) (Lithuania)	Anastasiia Akchurina / Olga Morozova; Rebeka Alekseviciute / Samanta Golubickaite	21; 11	21; 7

== Group 3 ==
=== France vs. England ===
France
4
Arena Stade Couvert, Court 1
11 February 2020 12:00

England
1

			1	2	3
1	(France) (England)	Qi Xuefei; Chloe Birch	21; 14	21; 13
2	(France) (England)	Vimala Hériau / Margot Lambert; Jenny Moore / Victoria Williams	21; 13	21; 18
3	(France) (England)	Marie Batomene; Abigail Holden	21; 13	21; 18
4	(France) (England)	Delphine Delrue / Anne Tran; Chloe Birch / Lauren Smith	18; 21	16; 21
5	(France) (England)	Yaelle Hoyaux; Freya Redfearn	21; 13	21; 15

=== Belarus vs. Israel ===
Belarus
3
Arena Stade Couvert, Court 7
11 February 2020 12:00

Israel
2

			1	2	3
1	(Belarus) (Israel)	Anastasiya Cherniavskaya; Ksenia Polikarpova	9; 21	17; 21
2	(Belarus) (Israel)	Alesia Zaitsava; Dana Danilenko	21; 12	21; 11
3	(Belarus) (Israel)	Julia Bitsoukova; Heli Neiman	21; 17	21; 19
4	(Belarus) (Israel)	Anastasiya Cherniavskaya / Alesia Zaitsava; Yugal Pugach / Shery Rotshtein	21; 18	21; 14
5	(Belarus) (Israel)	Julia Bitsoukova / Maryana Viarbitsakaya; Heli Neiman / Ksenia Polikarpova	13; 21	11; 21

=== France vs. Belarus ===
France
5
Arena Stade Couvert, Court 1
12 February 2020 12:00

Belarus
0

			1	2	3
1	(France) (Belarus)	Qi Xuefei; Alesia Zaitsava	21; 8	21; 10
2	(France) (Belarus)	Marie Batomene; Maryana Viarbitsakaya	21; 15	21; 15
3	(France) (Belarus)	Yaelle Hoyaux; Julia Bitsoukova	21; 8	21; 17
4	(France) (Belarus)	Vimala Hériau / Margot Lambert; Anastasiya Cherniavskaya / Alesia Zaitsava	21; 9	21; 12
5	(France) (Belarus)	Juliette Moinard / Anne Tran; Julia Bitsoukova / Maryana Viarbitsakaya	21; 9	21; 9

=== England vs. Israel ===
England
4
Arena Stade Couvert, Court 5
12 February 2020 12:00

Israel
1

			1	2	3
1	(England) (Israel)	Abigail Holden; Ksenia Polikarpova	23; 21	17; 21	11; 21
2	(England) (Israel)	Pamela Reyes; Dana Danilenko	21; 17	18; 21	21; 15
3	(England) (Israel)	Jenny Moore / Victoria Williams; Ksenia Polikarpova / Shery Rotshtein	21; 5	21; 13
4	(England) (Israel)	Grace King; Heli Neiman	16; 21	21; 15	21; 11
5	(England) (Israel)	Chloe Birch / Lauren Smith; Dana Danilenko / Yugal Pugach	21; 9	21; 9

=== France vs. Israel ===
France
5
Arena Stade Couvert, Court 4
13 February 2020 14:00

Israel
0

			1	2	3
1	(France) (Israel)	Qi Xuefei; Ksenia Polikarpova	21; 15	11; 21	21; 10
2	(France) (Israel)	Yaëlle Hoyaux; Dana Danilenko	21; 8	21; 8
3	(France) (Israel)	Ophelia Casier; Yuval Pugach	13; 21	21; 10	21; 14
4	(France) (Israel)	Delphine Delrue / Anne Tran; Heli Neiman / Ksenia Polikarpova	21; 10	21; 8
5	(France) (Israel)	Vimala Hériau / Margot Lambert; Yuval Pugach / Shery Rotshtein	21; 7	21; 8

=== England vs. Belarus ===
England
5
Arena Stade Couvert, Court 6
13 February 2020 14:00

Belarus
0

			1	2	3
1	(England) (Belarus)	Abigail Holden; Anastasiya Cherniavskaya	21; 7	21; 15
2	(England) (Belarus)	Freya Redferan; Alesia Zaitsava	21; 10	21; 16
3	(England) (Belarus)	Grace King; Maryana Viarbitskaya	21; 17	15; 21	21; 17
4	(England) (Belarus)	Jenny Moore / Victoria Williams; Anastasiya Cherniavskaya / Alesia Zaitsava	21; 10	22; 20
5	(England) (Belarus)	Chloe Birch / Lauren Smith; Julia Bitsoukova / Maryana Viarbitskaya	21; 5	21; 4

== Group 4 ==
=== Germany vs. Slovakia ===
Germany
5
Arena Stade Couvert, Court 6
11 February 2020 12:00

Slovakia
0

			1	2	3
1	(Germany) (Slovakia)	Yvonne Li; Martina Repiská	21; 6	21; 6
2	(Germany) (Slovakia)	Fabienne Deprez; Katarina Vargova	21; 10	21; 17
3	(Germany) (Slovakia)	Lara Käpplein / Kilasu Ostermeyer; Mia Tarcalova / Lucia Vojtekova	21; 6	21; 9
4	(Germany) (Slovakia)	Ann-Kathrin Spöri; Natalia Tomcova	21; 19	21; 14
5	(Germany) (Slovakia)	Isabel Herttrich / Stine Küspert; Martina Repiská / Katarina Vargova	21; 12	21; 10

=== Portugal vs. Latvia ===
Portugal
2
Arena Stade Couvert, Court 4
11 February 2020 12:00

Latvia
3

			1	2	3
1	(Portugal) (Latvia)	Sonia Goncalves; Jekaterina Romanova	21; 18	16; 21	22; 20
2	(Portugal) (Latvia)	Adriana F. Goncalves; Ieva Pope	21; 19	18; 21	15; 21
3	(Portugal) (Latvia)	Luisa Faria; Diana Stognija	19; 21	21; 11	21; 18
4	(Portugal) (Latvia)	Adriana F. Goncalves / Sonia Goncalves; Liana Lencevica / Jekaterina Romanova	15; 21	16; 21
5	(Portugal) (Latvia)	Mariana Afonso / Ana Fernandes; Ieva Pope / Kristīne Šefere	14; 21	15; 21

=== Germany vs. Portugal ===
Germany
5
Arena Stade Couvert, Court 3
12 February 2020 19:00

Portugal
0

			1	2	3
1	(Germany) (Portugal)	Yvonne Li !Sonia Goncalves	21; 11	21; 14
2	(Germany) (Portugal)	Fabienne Deprez; Adriana F. Goncalves	21; 14	21; 13
3	(Germany) (Portugal)	Stine Küspert / Kilasu Ostermeyer; Mariana Afonso / Ana Fernandes	21; 9	21; 10
4	(Germany) (Portugal)	Miranda Wilson; Luisa Faria	21; 9	21; 13
5	(Germany) (Portugal)	Linda Efler / Isabel Herttrich; Adriana F. Goncalves / Sonia Goncalves				w/o

=== Slovakia vs. Latvia ===
Slovakia
4
Arena Stade Couvert, Court 4
12 February 2020 19:00

Latvia
1

			1	2	3
1	(Slovakia) (Latvia)	Martina Repiská; Jekaterina Romanova	21; 11	21; 12
2	(Slovakia) (Latvia)	Katarina Vargova; Ieva Pope	21; 14	21; 9
3	(Slovakia) (Latvia)	Natalia Tomcova; Diana Stognija	21; 15	21; 8
4	(Slovakia) (Latvia)	Martina Repiská / Katarina Vargova; Liana Lencevica / Jekaterina Romanova	21; 23	21; 18	21; 19
5	(Slovakia) (Latvia)	Mia Tarcalova / Lucia Vojtekova; Ieva Pope / Kristīne Šefere	17; 21	15; 21

=== Germany vs. Latvia ===
Germany
5
Arena Stade Couvert, Court 5
13 February 2020 14:00

Latvia
0

			1	2	3
1	(Germany) (Latvia)	Yvonne Li; Jekaterina Romanova	21; 12	21; 13
2	(Germany) (Latvia)	Fabienne Deprez; Ieva Pope	21; 9	21; 13
3	(Germany) (Latvia)	Ann-Kathrin Spöri; Diāna Stognija	21; 9	21; 7
4	(Germany) (Latvia)	Linda Efler / Stine Küspert; Liāna Lencevica / Jekaterina Romanova	21; 11	21; 7
5	(Germany) (Latvia)	Lara Käpplein / Kilasu Ostermeyer; Ieva Pope / Kristīne Šefere	21; 9	21; 6

=== Slovakia vs. Portugal ===
Slovakia
4
Arena Stade Couvert, Court 7
13 February 2020 14:00

Portugal
1

			1	2	3
1	(Slovakia) (Portugal)	Martina Repiská; Sonia Gonçalves	21; 11	21; 14
2	(Slovakia) (Portugal)	Katarina Vargová; Luisa Faria	21; 15	21; 7
3	(Slovakia) (Portugal)	Natalia Tomcova; Ana Fernandes	21; 10	21; 10
4	(Slovakia) (Portugal)	Mia Tarcalova / Katarina Vargová; Adriana F. Gonçalves / Sonia Gonçalves	21; 15	21; 15
5	(Slovakia) (Portugal)	Martina Repiská / Lucia Vojteková; Mariana Afonso / Ana Fernandes	15; 21	17; 21

== Group 5 ==
=== Bulgaria vs. Ukraine ===
Bulgaria
3
Arena Stade Couvert, Court 2
11 February 2020 12:00

Ukraine
2

			1	2	3
1	(Bulgaria) (Ukraine)	Mariya Mitsova; Marija Ulitina	21; 16	19; 21	21; 14
2	(Bulgaria) (Ukraine)	Linda Zetchiri; Natalya Voytsekh	21; 19	21; 18
3	(Bulgaria) (Ukraine)	Maria Delcheva; Maryna Ilyinskaya	21; 18	12; 21	15; 21
4	(Bulgaria) (Ukraine)	Mariya Mitsova / Dimitria Popstoikova; Anastasiya Prozorova / Valeriya Rudakova	21; 17	15; 21	21; 12
5	(Bulgaria) (Ukraine)	Maria Delcheva / Hristomira Popovska; Maryna Ilyinskaya / Yelyzaveta Zharka	16; 21	15; 21

=== Hungary vs. Wales ===
Hungary
4
Arena Stade Couvert, Court 8
11 February 2020 12:00

Wales
1

			1	2	3
1	(Hungary) (Wales)	Laura Sárosi; Jordan Hart	23; 21	17; 21	10; 21
2	(Hungary) (Wales)	Daniella Gonda; Jasmine Owen	21; 15	21; 10
3	(Hungary) (Wales)	Reka Madarasz; Aimie Whiteman	21; 3	21; 15
4	(Hungary) (Wales)	Daniella Gonda / Agnes Korosi; Alice Palmer / Aimie Whiteman	21; 10	21; 10
5	(Hungary) (Wales)	Reka Madarasz / Vivien Sandorhazi; Jasmine Owen / Katie Whiteman	21; 8	21; 5

=== Bulgaria vs. Hungary ===
Bulgaria
1
Arena Stade Couvert, Court 9
12 February 2020 19:00

Hungary
4

			1	2	3
1	(Bulgaria) (Hungary)	Mariya Mitsova; Laura Sárosi	21; 10	21; 19
2	(Bulgaria) (Hungary)	Linda Zetchiri; Reka Madarasz	21; 12	19; 21	13; 21
3	(Bulgaria) (Hungary)	Hristomira Popovska; Vivien Sandorhazi	7; 21	11; 21
4	(Bulgaria) (Hungary)	Maria Delcheva / Hristomira Popovska; Daniella Gonda / Agnes Korosi	17; 21	21; 18	17; 21
5	(Bulgaria) (Hungary)	Mariya Mitsova / Dimitria Popstoikova; Reka Madarasz / Vivien Sandorhazi	18; 21	16; 21

=== Ukraine vs. Wales ===
Ukraine
4
Arena Stade Couvert, Court 7
12 February 2020 19:00

Wales
1

			1	2	3
1	(Ukraine) (Wales)	Marija Ulitina; Jordan Hart	12; 21	21; 23
2	(Ukraine) (Wales)	Natalya Voytsekh; Jasmine Owen	21; 5	21; 3
3	(Ukraine) (Wales)	Anastasiya Prozorova; Aimie Whiteman	21; 6	21; 13
4	(Ukraine) (Wales)	Maryna Ilyinskaya / Yelyzaveta Zharka; Alice Palmer / Aimie Whiteman	21; 6	21; 6
5	(Ukraine) (Wales)	Anastasiya Prozorova / Valeriya Rudakova; Jasmine Owen / Katie Whiteman	21; 4	21; 11

=== Bulgaria vs. Wales ===
Bulgaria
5
Arena Stade Couvert, Court 9
13 February 2020 14:00

Wales
0

			1	2	3
1	(Bulgaria) (Wales)	Mariya Mitsova; Jordan Hart	21; 10	21; 18
2	(Bulgaria) (Wales)	Maria Delcheva; Jasmine Owen	21; 3	21; 6
3	(Bulgaria) (Wales)	Kaloyana Nalbantova; Aimie Whiteman	21; 12	21; 18
4	(Bulgaria) (Wales)	Mariya Mitsova / Dimitria Popstoikova; Jasmine Owen / Katie Whiteman	21; 10	21; 2
5	(Bulgaria) (Wales)	Maria Delcheva / Hristomira Popovska; Alive Palmer / Aimie Whiteman	21; 5	21; 8

=== Ukraine vs. Hungary ===
Ukraine
2
Arena Stade Couvert, Court 2
13 February 2020 14:00

Hungary
3

			1	2	3
1	(Ukraine) (Hungary)	Marija Ulitina; Laura Sárosi	16; 21	14; 21
2	(Ukraine) (Hungary)	Natalya Voytsekh; Reka Madarasz	17; 21	21; 6	20; 22
3	(Ukraine) (Hungary)	Maryna Ilyinskaya; Vivien Sandorhazi	18; 21	17; 21
4	(Ukraine) (Hungary)	Maryna Ilyinskaya / Yelyszveta Zharka; Daniella Gonda / Agnes Korosi	21; 11	21; 10
5	(Ukraine) (Hungary)	Anastasiya Prozorova / Valeriya Rudakova; Reka Madarasz / Vivien Sandorhazi	19; 21	21; 16	21; 17

== Group 6 ==
=== Turkey vs. Finland ===
Turkey
5
Arena Stade Couvert, Court 2
11 February 2020 19:00

Finland
0

			1	2	3
1	(Turkey) (Finland)	Neslihan Yiğit; Airi Mikkelä	21; 10	21; 7
2	(Turkey) (Finland)	Aliye Demirbağ; Nella Siilasmaa	21; 10	21; 4
3	(Turkey) (Finland)	Özge Bayrak; Hanna Karkaus	21; 6	21; 6
4	(Turkey) (Finland)	Zehra Erdem / İlayda Nur Özelgül; Maija Krzywacki / Airi Mikkelä	21; 6	21; 13
5	(Turkey) (Finland)	Bengisu Erçetin / Nazlıcan İnci; Hanna Karkaus / Nella Siilasmaa	21; 8	21; 12

=== Slovenia vs. Czech Republic ===
Slovenia
1
Arena Stade Couvert, Court 6
11 February 2020 19:00

Czech Republic
4

			1	2	3
1	(Slovenia) (Czech Republic)	Petra Polanc; Kateřina Tomalová	21; 23	17; 21
2	(Slovenia) (Czech Republic)	Lia Šalehar; Tereza Švábíková	16; 21	16; 21
3	(Slovenia) (Czech Republic)	Kaja Stanković; Sabina Milová	13; 21	14; 21
4	(Slovenia) (Czech Republic)	Nika Arih / Lia Šalehar; Alžběta Bášová / Michaela Fuchsová	19; 21	21; 17	21; 18
5	(Slovenia) (Czech Republic)	Petra Polanc / Kaja Stanković; Tereza Švábíková / Kateřina Tomalová	16; 21	15; 21

=== Turkey vs. Slovenia ===
Turkey
5
Arena Stade Couvert, Court 10
12 February 2020 12:00

Slovenia
0

			1	2	3
1	(Turkey) (Slovenia)	Neslihan Yiğit; Petra Polanc	21; 10	21; 12
2	(Turkey) (Slovenia)	Aliye Demirbağ; Kaja Stanković	21; 19	21; 18
3	(Turkey) (Slovenia)	Bengisu Erçetin / Nazlıcan İnci; Nika Arih / Lia Šalehar	21; 17	21; 10
4	(Turkey) (Slovenia)	Özge Bayrak; Nika Kotar	21; 14	21; 7
5	(Turkey) (Slovenia)	Zehra Erdem / İlayda Nur Özelgül; Petra Polanc / Kaja Stanković	21; 10	21; 12

=== Finland vs. Czech Republic ===
Finland
0
Arena Stade Couvert, Court 3
12 February 2020 12:00

Czech Republic
5

			1	2	3
1	(Finland) (Czech Republic)	Nella Siilasmaa; Kateřina Tomalová	14; 21	13; 21
2	(Finland) (Czech Republic)	Hanna Karkaus; Tereza Švábíková	15; 21	17; 21
3	(Finland) (Czech Republic)	Maija Krzywacki; Tallulah Sharleen van Capponolle	12; 21	8; 21
4	(Finland) (Czech Republic)	Hanna Karkaus / Nella Siilasmaa; Alžběta Bášová / Michaela Fuchsová	14; 21	11; 21
5	(Finland) (Czech Republic)	Maija Krzywacki / Airi Mikkelä; Tereza Švábíková / Kateřina Tomalová	18; 21	20; 22

=== Turkey vs. Czech Republic ===
Turkey
5
Arena Stade Couvert, Court 8
13 February 2020 10:00

Czech Republic
0

			1	2	3
1	(Turkey) (Czech Republic)	Neslihan Yiğit; Kateřina Tomalová	21; 10	21; 12
2	(Turkey) (Czech Republic)	Aliye Demirbağ; Tereza Švábíková	21; 14	21; 13
3	(Turkey) (Czech Republic)	Özge Bayrak; Sabina Milová	21; 11	21; 8
4	(Turkey) (Czech Republic)	Bengisu Erçetin / Nazlıcan İnci; Michaela Fuchsová / Kateřina Tomalová	21; 7	21; 12
5	(Turkey) (Czech Republic)	Zehra Erdem / İlayda Nur Özelgül; Alžběta Bášová / Tereza Švábíková	21; 17	23; 21

=== Finland vs. Slovenia ===
Finland
0
Arena Stade Couvert, Court 5
13 February 2020 10:00

Slovenia
5

			1	2	3
1	(Finland) (Slovenia)	Nella Siilasmaa; Petra Polanc	19; 21	12; 21
2	(Finland) (Slovenia)	Nella Nyqvist; Lia Šalehar	16; 21	21; 14	15; 21
3	(Finland) (Slovenia)	Maija Krzywacki; Kaja Stanković	9; 21	10; 21
4	(Finland) (Slovenia)	Hanna Karkaus / Nella Siilasmaa; Nika Arih / Lia Šalehar	21; 23	12; 21
5	(Finland) (Slovenia)	Maija Krzywacki / Nella Nyqvist; Petra Polanc / Kaja Stanković	17; 21	16; 21

== Group 7 ==
=== Poland vs. Sweden ===
Poland
1
Arena Stade Couvert, Court 10
11 February 2020 12:00

Sweden
4

			1	2	3
1	(Poland) (Sweden)	Wiktoria Dabczynska; Ashwathi Pillai	18; 21	15; 21
2	(Poland) (Sweden)	Zuzanna Jankowska; Rebecca Kuhl	21; 16	13; 21	21; 18
3	(Poland) (Sweden)	Karolina Szubert; Edith Urell	5; 21	12; 21
4	(Poland) (Sweden)	Zuzanna Jankowska / Magdalena Świerczyńska; Clara Nistad / Moa Sjoo	15; 21	15; 21
5	(Poland) (Sweden)	Aleksandra Goszczynska / Karolina Szubert; Emma Karlsson / Johanna Magnusson	13; 21	11; 21

=== Scotland vs. Norway ===
Scotland
5
Arena Stade Couvert, Court 5
11 February 2020 12:00

Norway
0

			1	2	3
1	(Scotland) (Norway)	Kirsty Gilmour; Emilie Hamang	21; 9	21; 5
2	(Scotland) (Norway)	Julie MacPherson / Ciara Torrence; Aimee Hong / Solvår Flåten Jørgensen	21; 5	21; 11
3	(Scotland) (Norway)	Holly Newall; Vera Ellingsen	21; 11	21; 9
4	(Scotland) (Norway)	Kirsty Gilmour / Eleanor O'Donnell; Sofia Macsali / Emilia Petersen Norberg	21; 16	21; 12
5	(Scotland) (Norway)	Rachel Sugden; Vilde Espeseth	21; 11	21; 12

=== Spain vs. Sweden ===
Spain
1
Arena Stade Couvert, Court 1
11 February 2020 19:00

Sweden
4

			1	2	3
1	(Spain) (Sweden)	Carolina Marín; Ashwathi Pillai	21; 9	21; 8
2	(Spain) (Sweden)	Beatriz Corrales; Rebecca Kuhl	15; 21	17; 21
3	(Spain) (Sweden)	Manuela Diaz; Edith Urell	13; 21	21; 23
4	(Spain) (Sweden)	Claudia Leal / Lorena Uslé; Emma Karlsson / Johanna Magnusson	7; 21	8; 21
5	(Spain) (Sweden)	Manuela Diaz / Ania Setien; Clara Nistad / Moa Sjoo	14; 21	8; 21

=== Poland vs. Norway ===
Poland
2
Arena Stade Couvert, Court 7
11 February 2020 19:00

Norway
3

			1	2	3
1	(Poland) (Norway)	Wiktoria Dabczynska; Emilie Hamang	17; 21	15; 21
2	(Poland) (Norway)	Zuzanna Jankowska; Sofia Macsali	22; 20	17; 21	17; 21
3	(Poland) (Norway)	Karolina Szubert; Vera Ellingsen	9; 21	11; 21
4	(Poland) (Norway)	Wiktoria Dabczynska / Aleksandra Goszczynska; Solvår Flåten Jørgensen / Sofia Macsali	21; 19	21; 16
5	(Poland) (Norway)	Magdalena Świerczyńska / Karolina Szubert; Marie Christensen / Aimee Hong	21; 18	21; 13

=== Poland vs. Scotland ===
Poland
0
Arena Stade Couvert, Court 8
12 February 2020 12:00

Scotland
5

			1	2	3
1	(Poland) (Scotland)	Wiktoria Dabczynska; Kirsty Gilmour	6; 21	13; 21
2	(Poland) (Scotland)	Zuzanna Jankowska; Holly Newall	8; 21	19; 21
3	(Poland) (Scotland)	Magdalena Świerczyńska; Rachel Sugden	8; 21	8; 21
4	(Poland) (Scotland)	Aleksandra Goszczynska / Karolina Szubert; Kirsty Gilmour / Eleanor O'Donnell	14; 21	9; 21
5	(Poland) (Scotland)	Zuzanna Jankowska / Magdalena Świerczyńska; Julie MacPherson / Holly Newall	17; 21	9; 21

=== Spain vs. Norway ===
Spain
3
Arena Stade Couvert, Court 7
12 February 2020 12:00

Norway
2

			1	2	3
1	(Spain) (Norway)	Carolina Marín; Emilie Hamang	21; 13	21; 13
2	(Spain) (Norway)	Beatriz Corrales; Sofia Macsali	18; 21	21; 17	12; 21
3	(Spain) (Norway)	Ania Setien; Vera Ellingsen	21; 19	21; 12
4	(Spain) (Norway)	Manuela Diaz / Claudia Leal; Solvår Flåten Jørgensen / Sofia Macsali	19; 21	19; 21
5	(Spain) (Norway)	Ania Setien / Lorena Uslé; Vilde Espeseth / Emilia Petersen Norberg	21; 16	21; 15

=== Spain vs. Scotland ===
Spain
1
Arena Stade Couvert, Court 1
12 February 2020 19:00

Scotland
4

			1	2	3
1	(Spain) (Scotland)	Carolina Marín; Kirsty Gilmour	21; 14	21; 13
2	(Spain) (Scotland)	Manuela Diaz; Holly Newall	12; 21	4; 21
3	(Spain) (Scotland)	Ania Setien; Rachel Sugden	13; 21	14; 21
4	(Spain) (Scotland)	Manuela Diaz / Claudia Leal; Kirsty Gilmour / Eleanor O'Donnell	13; 21	10; 21
5	(Spain) (Scotland)	Ania Setien / Lorena Uslé; Julie MacPherson / Holly Newall	4; 4			retired

=== Norway vs. Sweden ===
Norway
0
Arena Stade Couvert, Court 5
12 February 2020 19:00

Sweden
5

			1	2	3
1	(Norway) (Sweden)	Emilie Hamang; Ashwathi Pillai	18; 21	13; 21
2	(Norway) (Sweden)	Sofia Macsali; Rebecca Kuhl	21; 19	12; 21	8; 21
3	(Norway) (Sweden)	Marie Christensen / Aimee Hong; Clara Nistad / Cecilia Wang	4; 21	12; 21
4	(Norway) (Sweden)	Vera Ellingsen; Edith Urell	7; 21	10; 21
5	(Norway) (Sweden)	Solvår Flåten Jørgensen / Sofia Macsali; Emma Karlsson / Johanna Magnusson	12; 21	12; 21

=== Scotland vs. Sweden ===
Scotland
2
Arena Stade Couvert, Court 3
13 February 2020 14:00

Sweden
3

			1	2	3
1	(Scotland) (Sweden)	Kirsty Gilmour; Ashwathi Pillai	21; 9	21; 13
2	(Scotland) (Sweden)	Holly Newall; Rebecca Kuhl	21; 12	10; 21	19; 21
3	(Scotland) (Sweden)	Rachel Sugden; Edith Urell	16; 21	15; 21
4	(Scotland) (Sweden)	Holly Newall / Eleanor O'Donnell; Emma Karlsson / Johanna Magnusson	10; 21	10; 21
5	(Scotland) (Sweden)	Kirsty Gilmour / Julie MacPherson; Clara Distad / Moa Sjöö	23; 21	11; 8		retired

=== Spain vs. Poland ===
Spain
1
Arena Stade Couvert, Court 10
13 February 2020 14:00

Poland
4

			1	2	3
1	(Spain) (Poland)	Beatriz Corrales; Wiktoria Dąbczyńska	17; 21	23; 25
2	(Spain) (Poland)	Manuela Diaz; Joanna Podedworny	11; 21	21; 12	21; 18
3	(Spain) (Poland)	Claudia Leal; Zuzanna Jankowska	11; 21	15; 21
4	(Spain) (Poland)	Manuela Diaz / Ania Setien; Magdalena Świerczyńska / Karolina Szubert	7; 11			retired
5	(Spain) (Poland)	Claudia Leal / Lorena Uslé; Wiktoria Dąbczyńska / Aleksandra Goszczyńska	14; 21	16; 21
