= 2020 European Men's Team Badminton Championships group stage =

This article lists the full results for group stage of 2020 European Men's Team Badminton Championships. All times are Central European Time (UTC+01:00).

== Group 1 ==
=== Denmark vs. Wales ===
Denmark
5
Arena Stade Couvert, Court 3
11 February 2020 19:00

Wales
0

			1	2	3
1	(Denmark) (Wales)	Viktor Axelsen; Mo Tsung Fung	21; 5	21; 11
2	(Denmark) (Wales)	Anders Antonsen; William Kitching	21; 9	21; 6
3	(Denmark) (Wales)	Jan Ø. Jørgensen; Andrew Oates	21; 9	21; 5
4	(Denmark) (Wales)	Mathias Boe / Mads Conrad-Petersen; Andrew Jones / Adam Stewart	21; 14	21; 7
5	(Denmark) (Wales)	Anders Skaarup Rasmussen / Frederik Søgaard; Andrew Oates / Scott Oates	21; 7	21; 8

=== Latvia vs. Switzerland ===
Latvia
0
Arena Stade Couvert, Court 10
11 February 2020 19:00

Switzerland
5

			1	2	3
1	(Latvia) (Switzerland)	Andis Bērziņš; Christian Kirchmayr	6; 21	9; 21
2	(Latvia) (Switzerland)	Ivo Keiss; Joel König	8; 21	8; 21
3	(Latvia) (Switzerland)	Niks Podosinoviks; Tobias Kuenzi	13; 21	18; 21
4	(Latvia) (Switzerland)	Paul Gureckis / Toms Preinbergs; Nicolas A. Mueller / Julien Scheiwiller	7; 21	14; 21
5	(Latvia) (Switzerland)	Andis Bērziņš / Niks Podosinoviks; Tobias Kuenzi / Yann Orteu	11; 21	14; 21

=== Denmark vs. Latvia ===
Denmark
5
Arena Stade Couvert, Court 6
12 February 2020 12:00

Latvia
0

			1	2	3
1	(Denmark) (Latvia)	Viktor Axelsen; Andis Bērziņš	21; 6	21; 9
2	(Denmark) (Latvia)	Jan Ø. Jørgensen; Paul Gureckis	21; 7	21; 8
3	(Denmark) (Latvia)	Hans-Kristian Vittinghus; Niks Podosinoviks	21; 1	21; 14
4	(Denmark) (Latvia)	Mathias Boe / Mads Conrad-Petersen; Andis Bērziņš / Paul Gureckis	21; 4	21; 7
5	(Denmark) (Latvia)	Kim Astrup / Anders Skaarup Rasmussen; Niks Podosinoviks / Toms Preinbergs	21; 6	21; 4

=== Wales vs. Switzerland ===
Wales
0
Arena Stade Couvert, Court 9
12 February 2020 12:00

Switzerland
5

			1	2	3
1	(Wales) (Switzerland)	Mo Tsung Fung; Christian Kirchmayr	11; 21	8; 21
2	(Wales) (Switzerland)	William Kitching; Joel König	11; 21	13; 21
3	(Wales) (Switzerland)	Andrew Oates; Tobias Kuenzi	17; 21	11; 21
4	(Wales) (Switzerland)	Andrew Jones / Adam Stewart; Nicolas A. Mueller / Julien Scheiwiller	15; 21	21; 17	13; 21
5	(Wales) (Switzerland)	William Kitching / Scott Oates; Tobias Kuenzi / Yann Orteu	10; 21	14; 21

=== Denmark vs. Switzerland ===
Denmark
5
Arena Stade Couvert, Court 3
13 February 2020 10:00

Switzerland
0

			1	2	3
1	(Denmark) (Switzerland)	Anders Antonsen; Christian Kirchmayr	21; 8	21; 14
2	(Denmark) (Switzerland)	Jan Ø. Jørgensen; Tobias Kuenzi	21; 19	21; 10
3	(Denmark) (Switzerland)	Hans-Kristian Vittinghus; Nicolas A. Mueller	21; 11	21; 9
4	(Denmark) (Switzerland)	Kim Astrup / Anders Skaarup Rasmussen; Joel König / Julien Scheiwiller	21; 12	21; 4
5	(Denmark) (Switzerland)	Mathias Boe / Mads Conrad-Petersen; Tobias Kuenzi / Yann Orteu	21; 12	21; 9

=== Wales vs. Latvia ===
Wales
4
Arena Stade Couvert, Court 4
13 February 2020 10:00

Latvia
1

			1	2	3
1	(Wales) (Latvia)	Mo Tsung Fung; Andis Bērziņš	21; 15	21; 10
2	(Wales) (Latvia)	William Kitching; Ivo Keiss	21; 13	21; 14
3	(Wales) (Latvia)	Andrew Oates; Niks Podosinoviks	21; 13	18; 21	23; 25
4	(Wales) (Latvia)	Andrew Jones / Adam Stewart; Niks Podosinoviks / Toms Preinbergs	21; 15	21; 18
5	(Wales) (Latvia)	William Kitching / Andrew Oates; Andis Bērziņš / Paul Gureckis	21; 7	21; 18

== Group 2 ==
=== England vs. Estonia ===
England
4
Arena Stade Couvert, Court 4
11 February 2020 09:00

Estonia
1

			1	2	3
1	(England) (Estonia)	Toby Penty; Raul Must	21; 13	17; 21	15; 21
2	(England) (Estonia)	Alex Lane; Karl Kert	21; 14	21; 15
3	(England) (Estonia)	Ben Lane / Sean Vendy; Kristjan Kaljurand / Raul Käsner	21; 13	21; 14
4	(England) (Estonia)	David Jones; Mihkel Laanes	21; 9	13; 21	21; 13
5	(England) (Estonia)	Marcus Ellis / Gregory Mairs; Karl Kert / Hans-Kristjan Pilve	21; 11	21; 11

=== Greenland vs. Sweden ===
Greenland
0
Arena Stade Couvert, Court 3
11 February 2020 09:00

Sweden
5

			1	2	3
1	(Greenland) (Sweden)	Jens-Frederik Nielsen; Felix Burestedt	6; 21	9; 21
2	(Greenland) (Sweden)	Toke Ketwa-Driefer; Andy Tsai	7; 21	13; 21
3	(Greenland) (Sweden)	Taatsiannguaq Pedersen; Ludvig Petre Olsson	6; 21	8; 21
4	(Greenland) (Sweden)	Toke Ketwa-Driefer / Sequssuna Fleischer Schmidt; Joel Hansson / Jacob Nilsson	14; 21	10; 21
5	(Greenland) (Sweden)	Jens-Frederik Nielsen / Taatsiannguaq Pedersen; Tim Foo / Melker Z-Bexell	6; 21	11; 21

=== England vs. Greenland ===
England
5
Arena Stade Couvert, Court 5
12 February 2020 09:00

Greenland
0

			1	2	3
1	(England) (Greenland)	Toby Penty; Jens-Frederik Nielsen	21; 7	21; 10
2	(England) (Greenland)	David Jones; Toke Ketwa-Driefer	21; 8	21; 9
3	(England) (Greenland)	Harry Huang; Sequssuna Fleischer Schmidt	21; 12	21; 4
4	(England) (Greenland)	Sean Vendy / Tom Wolfenden; Toke Ketwa-Driefer / Taatsiannguaq Pedersen	21; 6	21; 10
5	(England) (Greenland)	Ben Lane / Gregory Mairs; Jens-Frederik Nielsen / Sequssuna Fleischer Schmidt	21; 4	21; 8

=== Estonia vs. Sweden ===
Estonia
2
Arena Stade Couvert, Court 9
12 February 2020 09:00

Sweden
3

			1	2	3
1	(Estonia) (Sweden)	Raul Must; Felix Burestedt	21; 19	21; 18
2	(Estonia) (Sweden)	Mihkel Laanes; Jacob Nilsson	18; 21	12; 21
3	(Estonia) (Sweden)	Kristjan Kaljurand / Raul Käsner; Joel Hansson / Melker Z-Bexell	20; 22	21; 15	19; 21
4	(Estonia) (Sweden)	Hans-Kristjan Pilve; Andy Tsai	12; 21	9; 21
5	(Estonia) (Sweden)	Karl Kert / Mihkel Laanes; Tim Foo / Ludvig Petre Olsson	21; 7	11; 2		retired

=== England vs. Sweden ===
England
4
Arena Stade Couvert, Court 1
13 February 2020 10:00

Sweden
1

			1	2	3
1	(England) (Sweden)	Toby Penty; Felix Burestedt	21; 18	7; 21	21; 13
2	(England) (Sweden)	Alex Lane; Jacob Nilsson	19; 21	17; 21
3	(England) (Sweden)	Harry Huang; Andy Tsai	21; 11	21; 12
4	(England) (Sweden)	Ben Lane / Sean Vendy; Joel Hansson / Melker Z-Bexell	21; 15	21; 12
5	(England) (Sweden)	Marcus Ellis / Tom Wolfenden; Jacob Nilsson / Ludvig Petre Olsson	21; 9	21; 12

=== Estonia vs. Greenland ===
Estonia
5
Arena Stade Couvert, Court 6
13 February 2020 10:00

Greenland
0

			1	2	3
1	(Estonia) (Greenland)	Karl Kert; Jens-Frederik Nielsen	21; 12	21; 8
2	(Estonia) (Greenland)	Mihkel Laanes; Toke Ketwa-Driefer	21; 6	21; 9
3	(Estonia) (Greenland)	Hans-Kristjan Pilve; Sequssuna Fleischer Schmidt	21; 5	21; 13
4	(Estonia) (Greenland)	Karl Kert / Mihkel Laanes; Toke Ketwa-Driefer / Taatsiannguaq Pedersen	21; 12	21; 14
5	(Estonia) (Greenland)	Kristjan Kaljurand / Raul Käsner; Jens-Frederik Nielsen / Sequssuna Fleischer Schmidt	21; 17	21; 8

== Group 3 ==
=== France vs. Hungary ===
France
5
Arena Stade Couvert, Court 3
11 February 2020 16:00

Hungary
0

			1	2	3
1	(France) (Hungary)	Lucas Claerbout; Gergely Krausz	5; 1			retired
2	(France) (Hungary)	Christo Popov; Gergo Pytel	21; 11	21; 4
3	(France) (Hungary)	Arnaud Merklé; Marton Szerecz	21; 10	21; 10
4	(France) (Hungary)	Thom Gicquel / Ronan Labar; Andras Piliszky / Gergo Pytel	21; 7	21; 11
5	(France) (Hungary)	Eloi Adam / Julien Maio; Marton Szerecz / Gergely Szita	21; 6	21; 13

=== Turkey vs. Belgium ===
Turkey
1
Arena Stade Couvert, Court 2
11 February 2020 16:00

Belgium
4

			1	2	3
1	(Turkey) (Belgium)	Emre Lale; Maxime Moreels	21; 12	21; 9
2	(Turkey) (Belgium)	Mehmet Capar / Emre Sonmez; Freek Golinski / Floris Oleffe	21; 23	13; 21
3	(Turkey) (Belgium)	Haktan Doğan; Elias Bracke	21; 14	18; 21	13; 21
4	(Turkey) (Belgium)	Serdar Koca / Serhat Salim; Rowan Scheurkogel / Jona van Nieuwkerke	25; 23	18; 21	15; 21
5	(Turkey) (Belgium)	Murathan Eken; Julien Carraggi	12; 21	20; 22

=== France vs. Turkey ===
France
5
Arena Stade Couvert, Court 1
12 February 2020 16:00

Turkey
0

			1	2	3
1	(France) (Turkey)	Toma Junior Popov; Emre Lale	23; 21	21; 10
2	(France) (Turkey)	Eloi Adam / Julien Maio; Mehmet Capar / Emre Sonmez	21; 19	21; 13
3	(France) (Turkey)	Lucas Claerbout; Haktan Doğan	21; 11	21; 6
4	(France) (Turkey)	Samy Corvee / William Villeger; Serdar Koca / Serhat Salim	19; 21	21; 13	21; 13
5	(France) (Turkey)	Arnaud Merklé; Murathan Eken	21; 5	21; 9

=== Hungary vs. Belgium ===
Hungary
0
Arena Stade Couvert, Court 3
12 February 2020 16:00

Belgium
5

			1	2	3
1	(Hungary) (Belgium)	Gergo Pytel; Maxime Moreels	21; 15	12; 21	17; 21
2	(Hungary) (Belgium)	Andras Piliszky; Elias Bracke	3; 21	9; 21
3	(Hungary) (Belgium)	Marton Szerecz; Julien Carraggi	16; 21	21; 18	9; 21
4	(Hungary) (Belgium)	Gergo Pytel / Gergely Szita; Rowan Scheurkogel / Jona van Nieuwkerke	14; 21	17; 21
5	(Hungary) (Belgium)	Andras Piliszky / Marton Szerecz; Freek Golinski / Floris Oleffe	8; 21	8; 21

=== France vs. Belgium ===
France
5
Arena Stade Couvert, Court 3
13 February 2020 18:00

Belgium
0

			1	2	3
1	(France) (Belgium)	Brice Leverdez; Maxime Moreels	21; 18	21; 13
2	(France) (Belgium)	Christo Popov; Elias Bracke	21; 18	21; 18
3	(France) (Belgium)	Arnaud Merklé; Julien Carraggi	21; 8	21; 12
4	(France) (Belgium)	Thom Gicquel / Ronan Labar; Freek Golinski / Floris Oleffe	21; 13	21; 16
5	(France) (Belgium)	Eloi Adam / Julien Maio; Rowan Scheurkogel / Jona van Nieuwkerke	21; 12	21; 10

=== Hungary vs. Turkey ===
Hungary
1
Arena Stade Couvert, Court 7
13 February 2020 18:00

Turkey
4

			1	2	3
1	(Hungary) (Turkey)	Gergo Pytel; Emre Lale	15; 21	10; 21
2	(Hungary) (Turkey)	Andras Piliszky; Haktan Doğan	21; 19	16; 21	9; 21
3	(Hungary) (Turkey)	Marton Szerecz; Murathan Eken	21; 19	21; 18
4	(Hungary) (Turkey)	Gergo Pytel / Gergely Szita; Serdar Koca / Serhat Salim	21; 16	17; 21	13; 21
5	(Hungary) (Turkey)	Andras Piliszky / Marton Szerecz; Mehmet Capar / Emre Sonmez	13; 21	15; 21

== Group 4 ==
=== Russia vs. Austria ===
Russia
5
Arena Stade Couvert, Court 5
11 February 2020 09:00

Austria
0

			1	2	3
1	(Russia) (Austria)	Vladimir Malkov; Luka Wraber	21; 16	21; 18
2	(Russia) (Austria)	Sergey Sirant; Wolfgang Gnedt	19; 21	21; 19	21; 15
3	(Russia) (Austria)	Georgii Karpov; Philipp Drexler	21; 8	21; 10
4	(Russia) (Austria)	Vladimir Ivanov / Nikita Khakimov; Philip Birker / Dominik Stipsits	21; 11	21; 17
5	(Russia) (Austria)	Rodion Alimov / Ivan Sozonov; Philipp Drexler / Leon Seiwald	21; 15	21; 11

=== Ireland vs. Poland ===
Ireland
4
Arena Stade Couvert, Court 1
11 February 2020 09:00

Poland
1

			1	2	3
1	(Republic of Ireland) (Poland)	Nhat Nguyen; Michał Rogalski	4; 1			retired
2	(Republic of Ireland) (Poland)	Jonathan Dolan; Mateusz Swierczynski	21; 18	21; 18
3	(Republic of Ireland) (Poland)	Joshua Magee; Mateusz Dubowski	23; 25	21; 11	18; 21
4	(Republic of Ireland) (Poland)	Jonathan Dolan / Nhat Nguyen; Adam Cwalina / Wiktor Trecki	21; 17	21; 15
5	(Republic of Ireland) (Poland)	Joshua Magee / Paul Reynolds; Paweł Śmiłowski / Przemyslaw Szydlowski	23; 21	21; 17

=== Russia vs. Ireland ===
Russia
5
Arena Stade Couvert, Court 10
12 February 2020 19:00

Ireland
0

			1	2	3
1	(Russia) (Republic of Ireland)	Vladimir Malkov; Nhat Nguyen	15; 21	24; 22	21; 19
2	(Russia) (Republic of Ireland)	Sergey Sirant; Jonathan Dolan	24; 22	21; 18
3	(Russia) (Republic of Ireland)	Georgii Karpov; Joshua Magee	18; 21	21; 16	21; 19
4	(Russia) (Republic of Ireland)	Rodion Alimov / Ivan Sozonov; Jonathan Dolan / Nhat Nguyen	21; 19	21; 14
5	(Russia) (Republic of Ireland)	Vladimir Ivanov / Nikita Khakimov; Joshua Magee / Paul Reynolds	21; 19	21; 8

=== Austria vs. Poland ===
Austria
3
Arena Stade Couvert, Court 2
12 February 2020 19:00

Poland
2

			1	2	3
1	(Austria) (Poland)	Luka Wraber; Michał Rogalski	7; 2			retired
2	(Austria) (Poland)	Wolfgang Gnedt; Mateusz Swierczynski	21; 19	21; 14
3	(Austria) (Poland)	Leon Seiwald; Mateusz Dubowski	17; 21	21; 14	21; 17
4	(Austria) (Poland)	Philip Birker / Dominik Stipsits; Paweł Śmiłowski / Przemyslaw Szydlowski	14; 21	18; 21
5	(Austria) (Poland)	Philipp Drexler / Leon Seiwald; Adam Cwalina / Wiktor Trecki	20; 22	18; 21

=== Russia vs. Poland ===
Russia
4
Arena Stade Couvert, Court 1
13 February 2020 18:00

Poland
1

			1	2	3
1	(Russia) (Poland)	Vladimir Malkov; Mateusz Swierczynski	21; 19	21; 13
2	(Russia) (Poland)	Sergey Sirant; Mateusz Dubowski	16; 5			retired
3	(Russia) (Poland)	Georgii Lebedev; Mikolaj Szymanowski	21; 14	21; 11
4	(Russia) (Poland)	Vladimir Ivanov / Ivan Sozonov; Paweł Śmiłowski / Przemyslaw Szydlowski	21; 12	21; 18
5	(Russia) (Poland)	Denis Grachev / Pavel Kotsarenko; Adam Cwalina / Wiktor Trecki	20; 22	10; 21

=== Austria vs. Ireland ===
Austria
3
Arena Stade Couvert, Court 2
13 February 2020 18:00

Ireland
2

			1	2	3
1	(Austria) (Republic of Ireland)	Luka Wraber; Nhat Nguyen	23; 21	17; 21	16; 21
2	(Austria) (Republic of Ireland)	Wolfgang Gnedt; Jonathan Dolan	21; 15	21; 5
3	(Austria) (Republic of Ireland)	Leon Seiwald; Joshua Magee	16; 21	21; 18	21; 18
4	(Austria) (Republic of Ireland)	Philipp Drexler / Wolfgang Gnedt; Jonathan Dolan / Nhat Nguyen	17; 21	8; 21
5	(Austria) (Republic of Ireland)	Leon Seiwald / Dominik Stipsits; Joshua Magee / Paul Reynolds	22; 20	21; 19

== Group 5 ==
=== Germany vs. Czech Republic ===
Germany
5
Arena Stade Couvert, Court 10
11 February 2020 16:00

Czech Republic
0

			1	2	3
1	(Germany) (Czech Republic)	Kai Schäfer; Milan Ludík	18; 21	21; 17	21; 12
2	(Germany) (Czech Republic)	Max Weißkirchen; Adam Mendrek	21; 11	21; 14
3	(Germany) (Czech Republic)	Mark Lamsfuß / Marvin Emil Seidel; Jaromír Janáček / Tomáš Švejda	21; 11	21; 17
4	(Germany) (Czech Republic)	Lars Schänzler; Jan Louda	21; 17	21; 13
5	(Germany) (Czech Republic)	Jones Ralfy Jansen / Peter Käsbauer; Ondřej Král / Adam Mendrek	21; 19	21; 13

=== Azerbaijan vs. Iceland ===
Azerbaijan
2
Arena Stade Couvert, Court 8
11 February 2020 16:00

Iceland
3

			1	2	3
1	(Azerbaijan) (Iceland)	Ade Resky Dwicahyo; Kari Gunnarsson	21; 6	21; 15
2	(Azerbaijan) (Iceland)	Azmy Qowimuramadhoni; Kristofer Darri Finnsson	21; 5	21; 12
3	(Azerbaijan) (Iceland)	Orkhan Galandarov; Daniel Johannesson	11; 21	10; 21
4	(Azerbaijan) (Iceland)	Ade Resky Dwicahyo / Azmy Qowimuramadhoni; David Bjarni Bjornsson / Kristofer Darri Finnsson	21; 17	19; 21	17; 21
5	(Azerbaijan) (Iceland)	Jahid Alhasanov / Sabuhi Huseynov; Kari Gunnarsson / Daniel Johannesson	8; 21	10; 21

=== Germany vs. Azerbaijan ===
Germany
5
Arena Stade Couvert, Court 4
12 February 2020 16:00

Azerbaijan
0

			1	2	3
1	(Germany) (Azerbaijan)	Max Weißkirchen; Ade Resky Dwicahyo	21; 6	25; 23
2	(Germany) (Azerbaijan)	Lars Schänzler; Azmy Qowimuramadhoni	21; 13	21; 14
3	(Germany) (Azerbaijan)	Bjarne Geiss / Jan Colin Völker; Jahid Alhasanov / Sabuhi Huseynov	21; 5	21; 10
4	(Germany) (Azerbaijan)	Samuel Hsiao; Agil Gabilov	21; 9	21; 8
5	(Germany) (Azerbaijan)	Jones Ralfy Jansen / Peter Käsbauer; Ade Resky Dwicahyo / Azmy Qowimuramadhoni	21; 10	21; 18

=== Czech Republic vs. Iceland ===
Czech Republic
5
Arena Stade Couvert, Court 6
12 February 2020 16:00

Iceland
0

			1	2	3
1	(Czech Republic) (Iceland)	Milan Ludík; Kari Gunnarsson	20; 22	21; 17	21; 18
2	(Czech Republic) (Iceland)	Jan Louda; Kristofer Darri Finnsson	21; 9	21; 4
3	(Czech Republic) (Iceland)	Ondřej Král; Daniel Johannesson	21; 8	21; 10
4	(Czech Republic) (Iceland)	Jaromír Janáček / Tomáš Švejda; David Bjarni Bjornsson / Kristofer Darri Finnsson	18; 21	21; 13	21; 11
5	(Czech Republic) (Iceland)	Ondřej Král / Adam Mendrek; Kari Gunnarsson / Daniel Johannesson	21; 16	21; 13

=== Germany vs. Iceland ===
Germany
5
Arena Stade Couvert, Court 5
13 February 2020 18:00

Iceland
0

			1	2	3
1	(Germany) (Iceland)	Kai Schäfer; Kari Gunnarsson	18; 21	21; 19	21; 8
2	(Germany) (Iceland)	Max Weißkirchen; Daniel Johannesson	21; 11	21; 7
3	(Germany) (Iceland)	Samuel Hsiao; David Bjarni Bjornsson	21; 11	21; 7
4	(Germany) (Iceland)	Bjarne Geiss / Jan Colin Völker; Kari Gunnarsson / Daniel Johannesson	21; 11	21; 11
5	(Germany) (Iceland)	Jones Ralfy Jansen / Peter Käsbauer; David Bjarni Bjornsson / Kristofer Darri Finnsson	21; 16	21; 8

=== Czech Republic vs. Azerbaijan ===
Czech Republic
5
Arena Stade Couvert, Court 4
13 February 2020 18:00

Azerbaijan
0

			1	2	3
1	(Czech Republic) (Azerbaijan)	Milan Ludík; Ade Resky Dwicahyo	21; 16	21; 17
2	(Czech Republic) (Azerbaijan)	Jan Louda; Azmy Qowimuramadhoni	21; 17	22; 20
3	(Czech Republic) (Azerbaijan)	Ondřej Král; Orkhan Galandarov	21; 7	21; 12
4	(Czech Republic) (Azerbaijan)	Jaromír Janáček / Tomáš Švejda; Ade Resky Dwicahyo / Azmy Qowimuramadhoni	21; 18	13; 21	21; 14
5	(Czech Republic) (Azerbaijan)	Ondřej Král / Adam Mendrek; Jahid Alhasanov / Sabuhi Huseynov	21; 12	21; 11

== Group 6 ==
=== Netherlands vs. Slovakia ===
Netherlands
5
Arena Stade Couvert, Court 5
11 February 2020 19:00

Slovakia
0

			1	2	3
1	(Netherlands) (Slovakia)	Mark Caljouw; Milan Dratva	21; 14	21; 15
2	(Netherlands) (Slovakia)	Joran Kweekel; Andrej Antoska	21; 11	21; 14
3	(Netherlands) (Slovakia)	Finn Achthoven; Jakub Horak	21; 13	21; 12
4	(Netherlands) (Slovakia)	Ruben Jille / Ties van der Lecq; Milan Dratva / Juraj Vachalek	21; 13	21; 12
5	(Netherlands) (Slovakia)	Jelle Maas / Robin Tabeling; Andrej Antoska / Jakub Horak	21; 15	21; 6

=== Luxembourg vs. Lithuania ===
Luxembourg
0
Arena Stade Couvert, Court 9
11 February 2020 19:00

Lithuania
5

			1	2	3
1	(Luxembourg) (Lithuania)	Robert Mann; Mark Sames	17; 21	17; 21
2	(Luxembourg) (Lithuania)	Kevin Hargiono; Jonas Petkus	13; 21	13; 21
3	(Luxembourg) (Lithuania)	Leo Hölzmer; Danielius Beržanskis	15; 21	8; 21
4	(Luxembourg) (Lithuania)	Robert Mann / Maxime Szturma; Mark Sames / Edgaras Slusnys	13	17
5	(Luxembourg) (Lithuania)	Yannick Feltes / Jerome Pauquet; Danielius Beržanskis / Jonas Petkus	21; 13	12; 21	12; 21

=== Netherlands vs. Luxembourg ===
Netherlands
5
Arena Stade Couvert, Court 4
12 February 2020 12:00

Luxembourg
0

			1	2	3
1	(Netherlands) (Luxembourg)	Mark Caljouw; Robert Mann	21; 11	21; 10
2	(Netherlands) (Luxembourg)	Joran Kweekel; Leo Hölzmer	21; 3	21; 7
3	(Netherlands) (Luxembourg)	Robin Tabeling / Wessel van der Aar; Kevin Hargiono / Maxime Szturma	21; 7	21; 13
4	(Netherlands) (Luxembourg)	Finn Achthoven; Jerome Pauquet	21; 13	21; 19
5	(Netherlands) (Luxembourg)	Ruben Jille / Ties van der Lecq; Yannick Feltes / Leo Hölzmer	21; 7	21; 8

=== Slovakia vs. Lithuania ===
Slovakia
5
Arena Stade Couvert, Court 2
12 February 2020 12:00

Lithuania
0

			1	2	3
1	(Slovakia) (Lithuania)	Milan Dratva; Mark Sames	21; 15	21; 17
2	(Slovakia) (Lithuania)	Andrej Antoska; Danielius Beržanskis	21; 16	21; 16
3	(Slovakia) (Lithuania)	Jakub Horak; Edgaras Slusnys	21; 17	21; 8
4	(Slovakia) (Lithuania)	Milan Dratva / Juraj Vachalek; Danielius Beržanskis / Jonas Petkus	21; 10	21; 12
5	(Slovakia) (Lithuania)	Andrej Antoska / Jakub Horak; Mark Sames / Edgaras Slusnys	25; 23	21; 13

=== Netherlands vs. Lithuania ===
Netherlands
5
Arena Stade Couvert, Court 6
13 February 2020 18:00

Lithuania
0

			1	2	3
1	(Netherlands) (Lithuania)	Mark Caljouw; Mark Sames	21; 13	21; 12
2	(Netherlands) (Lithuania)	Joran Kweekel; Jonas Petkus	21; 11	21; 9
3	(Netherlands) (Lithuania)	Finn Achthoven; Danielius Beržanskis	19; 21	21; 16	21; 13
4	(Netherlands) (Lithuania)	Jelle Maas / Robin Tabeling; Mark Sames / Edgaras Slusnys	21; 11	21; 3
5	(Netherlands) (Lithuania)	Wessel van der Aar / Ties van der Lecq; Danielius Beržanskis / Jonas Petkus	21; 13			retired

=== Slovakia vs. Luxembourg ===
Slovakia
5
Arena Stade Couvert, Court 8
13 February 2020 18:00

Luxembourg
0

			1	2	3
1	(Slovakia) (Luxembourg)	Milan Dratva; Robert Mann	21; 10	21; 11
2	(Slovakia) (Luxembourg)	Andrej Antoska; Kevin Hargiono	21; 13	21; 11
3	(Slovakia) (Luxembourg)	Jakub Horak; Jerome Pauquet	21; 12	21; 16
4	(Slovakia) (Luxembourg)	Andrej Antoska / Jakub Horak; Robert Mann / Maxime Szturma	21; 11	21; 19
5	(Slovakia) (Luxembourg)	Milan Dratva / Juraj Vachalek; Yannick Feltes / Jerome Pauquet	21; 19	21; 13

== Group 7 ==
=== Portugal vs. Norway ===
Portugal
1
Arena Stade Couvert, Court 6
11 February 2020 09:00

Norway
4

			1	2	3
1	(Portugal) (Norway)	Bernard Atilano; Peter Roenn Stensaeth	21; 18	21; 10
2	(Portugal) (Norway)	Duarte Nuno Anjo; Vegard Rikheim	10; 21	21; 12	17; 21
3	(Portugal) (Norway)	Bruno Carvalho; Markus Barth	21; 18	18; 21	15; 21
4	(Portugal) (Norway)	Duarte Nuno Anjo / Daniel Mendes; Magnus Christensen / Fredrik Kristensen	15; 21	17; 21
5	(Portugal) (Norway)	Bruno Carvalho / Tomas Nero; Torjus Flaatten / Vegard Rikheim	17; 21	21; 13	9; 21

=== Slovenia vs. Ukraine ===
Slovenia
0
Arena Stade Couvert, Court 7
11 February 2020 09:00

Ukraine
5

			1	2	3
1	(Slovenia) (Ukraine)	Andraž Krapež; Artem Pochtarov	18; 21	16; 21
2	(Slovenia) (Ukraine)	Miha Ivančič; Danylo Bosniuk	17; 21	12; 21
3	(Slovenia) (Ukraine)	Andraž Krapež / Gasper Krivec; Ivan Druzchenko / Gennadiy Natarov	16; 21	12; 21
4	(Slovenia) (Ukraine)	Tilen Zalar; Dmytro Zavadsky	9; 21	14; 21
5	(Slovenia) (Ukraine)	Miha Ivančič / Rok Jercinovic; Valeriy Atrashchenkov / Danylo Bosniuk	17; 21	12; 21

=== Slovenia vs. Norway ===
Slovenia
1
Arena Stade Couvert, Court 9
11 February 2020 16:00

Norway
4

			1	2	3
1	(Slovenia) (Norway)	Andraž Krapež; Peter Roenn Stensaeth	21; 18	21; 16
2	(Slovenia) (Norway)	Miha Ivančič; Vegard Rikheim	10; 21	15; 21
3	(Slovenia) (Norway)	Tilen Zalar; Markus Barth	12; 21	11; 21
4	(Slovenia) (Norway)	Andraž Krapež / Gasper Krivec; Torjus Flaatten / Vegard Rikheim	13; 21	21; 12	18; 21
5	(Slovenia) (Norway)	Miha Ivančič / Rok Jercinovic; Magnus Christensen / Fredrik Kristensen	19; 21	15; 21

=== Finland vs. Ukraine ===
Finland
1
Arena Stade Couvert, Court 4
11 February 2020 16:00

Ukraine
4

			1	2	3
1	(Finland) (Ukraine)	Kalle Koljonen; Artem Pochtarov	21; 9	21; 13
2	(Finland) (Ukraine)	Eetu Heino; Danylo Bosniuk	14; 21	18; 21
3	(Finland) (Ukraine)	Iikka Heino; Dmytro Zavadsky	21; 16	16; 21	17; 21
4	(Finland) (Ukraine)	Iikka Heino / Anton Kaisti; Valeriy Atrashchenkov / Gennadiy Natarov	17; 21	14; 21
5	(Finland) (Ukraine)	Eetu Heino / Kalle Koljonen; Artem Pochtarov / Dmytro Zavadsky	16; 21	19; 21

=== Finland vs. Norway ===
Finland
4
Arena Stade Couvert, Court 1
12 February 2020 09:00

Norway
1

			1	2	3
1	(Finland) (Norway)	Kalle Koljonen; Peter Roenn Stensaeth	21; 9	21; 11
2	(Finland) (Norway)	Iikka Heino; Markus Barth	18; 21	21; 8	21; 16
3	(Finland) (Norway)	Joakim Oldorff; Torjus Flaatten	21; 13	21; 10
4	(Finland) (Norway)	Eetu Heino / Anton Kaisti; Magnus Christensen / Fredrik Kristensen	21; 17	21; 10
5	(Finland) (Norway)	Oskari Larkimo / Joakim Oldorff; Sturla Flaten Jorgensen / Carl Christian Mork	24; 22	22; 24	13; 21

=== Slovenia vs. Portugal ===
Slovenia
3
Arena Stade Couvert, Court 3
12 February 2020 09:00

Portugal
2

			1	2	3
1	(Slovenia) (Portugal)	Andraž Krapež; Bernard Atilano	18; 21	21; 23
2	(Slovenia) (Portugal)	Miha Ivančič; Duarte Nuno Anjo	21; 15	17; 21	21; 14
3	(Slovenia) (Portugal)	Tilen Zalar; Bruno Carvalho	12; 21	10; 21
4	(Slovenia) (Portugal)	Miha Ivančič / Rok Jercinovic; Duarte Nuno Anjo / Daniel Mendes	21; 14	18; 21	21; 15
5	(Slovenia) (Portugal)	Andraž Krapež / Gasper Krivec; Bruno Carvalho / Tomas Nero	21; 19	23; 21

=== Finland vs. Portugal ===
Finland
5
Arena Stade Couvert, Court 5
12 February 2020 16:00

Portugal
0

			1	2	3
1	(Finland) (Portugal)	Kalle Koljonen; Duarte Nuno Anjo	21; 7	21; 11
2	(Finland) (Portugal)	Eetu Heino; Bruno Carvalho	21; 10	21; 15
3	(Finland) (Portugal)	Joakim Oldorff; Daniel Mendes	21; 16	21; 16
4	(Finland) (Portugal)	Anton Kaisti / Joakim Oldorff; Bruno Carvalho / Tomas Nero	22; 20	21; 19
5	(Finland) (Portugal)	Eetu Heino / Iikka Heino; Duarte Nuno Anjo / Daniel Mendes	16; 21	21; 10	21; 12

=== Norway vs. Ukraine ===
Norway
0
Arena Stade Couvert, Court 7
12 February 2020 16:00

Ukraine
5

			1	2	3
1	(Norway) (Ukraine)	Peter Roenn Stensaeth; Artem Pochtarov	7; 21	16; 21
2	(Norway) (Ukraine)	Vegard Rikheim; Danylo Bosniuk	17; 21	21; 19	11; 21
3	(Norway) (Ukraine)	Markus Barth; Dmytro Zavadsky	14; 21	15; 21
4	(Norway) (Ukraine)	Torjus Flaatten / Vegard Rikheim; Ivan Druzchenko / Gennadiy Natarov	13; 21	14; 21
5	(Norway) (Ukraine)	Sturla Flaten Jorgensen / Carl Christian Mork; Valeriy Atrashchenkov / Dmytro Zavadsky	12; 21	13; 21

=== Finland vs. Slovenia ===
Finland
5
Arena Stade Couvert, Court 9
13 February 2020 18:00

Slovenia
0

			1	2	3
1	(Finland) (Slovenia)	Kalle Koljonen; Andraž Krapež	21; 17	21; 12
2	(Finland) (Slovenia)	Iikka Heino; Gasper Krivec	21; 14	21; 6
3	(Finland) (Slovenia)	Joakim Oldorff; Rok Jercinovic	21; 7	21; 15
4	(Finland) (Slovenia)	Anton Kaisti / Oskari Larkimo; Andraž Krapež / Gasper Krivec	21; 13	21; 14
5	(Finland) (Slovenia)	Iikka Heino / Joakim Oldorff; Miha Ivančič / Rok Jercinovic	23; 21	19; 21	21; 14

=== Portugal vs. Ukraine ===
Portugal
2
Arena Stade Couvert, Court 10
13 February 2020 18:00

Ukraine
3

			1	2	3
1	(Portugal) (Ukraine)	Bernardo Atilano; Artem Pochtarov	21; 11	18; 21	21; 15
2	(Portugal) (Ukraine)	Duarte Nuno Anjo; Ivan Druzchenko	14; 21	21; 9	21; 10
3	(Portugal) (Ukraine)	Bruno Carvalho; Dmytro Zavadsky	7; 21	6; 21
4	(Portugal) (Ukraine)	Duarte Nuno Anjo / Daniel Mendes; Danylo Bosniuk / Artem Pochtarov	14; 21	7; 21
5	(Portugal) (Ukraine)	Bruno Carvalho / Tomas Nero; Valeriy Atrashchenkov / Gennadiy Natarov	22; 20	19; 21	17; 21

== Group 8 ==
=== Bulgaria vs. Croatia ===
Bulgaria
2
Arena Stade Couvert, Court 8
11 February 2020 09:00

Croatia
3

			1	2	3
1	(Bulgaria) (Croatia)	Daniel Nikolov; Zvonimir Đurkinjak	21; 10	17; 21	21; 9
2	(Bulgaria) (Croatia)	Dimitar Yanakiev; Filip Špoljarec	21; 9	21; 10
3	(Bulgaria) (Croatia)	Peyo Boichinov; Luka Ban	15; 21	15; 21
4	(Bulgaria) (Croatia)	Stilian Makarski / Dimitar Yanakiev; Igor Čimbur / Zvonimir Hölbling	16; 21	13; 21
5	(Bulgaria) (Croatia)	Peyo Boichinov / Alex Vlaar; Zvonimir Đurkinjak / Filip Špoljarec	18; 21	21; 17	15; 21

=== Italy vs. Israel ===
Italy
4
Arena Stade Couvert, Court 2
11 February 2020 09:00

Israel
1

			1	2	3
1	(Italy) (Israel)	Fabio Caponio; Misha Zilberman	21; 23	15; 21
2	(Italy) (Israel)	Enrico Baroni; Yonathan Levit	21; 13	21; 14
3	(Italy) (Israel)	Gianmarco Bailetti / David Salutt; Ariel Shainski / Misha Zilberman	21; 16	21; 23	21; 13
4	(Italy) (Israel)	Giovanni Toti; May Bar Netzer	21; 9	19; 21	21; 18
5	(Italy) (Israel)	Giovanni Greco / Kevin Strobl; Maxim Grinblat / Yonathan Levit	19; 21	21; 14	21; 7

=== Spain vs. Croatia ===
Spain
5
Arena Stade Couvert, Court 5
11 February 2020 16:00

Croatia
0

			1	2	3
1	(Spain) (Croatia)	Pablo Abián; Zvonimir Đurkinjak	21; 15	21; 18
2	(Spain) (Croatia)	Luís Enrique Peñalver; Filip Špoljarec	21; 15	21; 19
3	(Spain) (Croatia)	Alvaro Vazquez; Luka Ban	21; 16	17; 21	21; 18
4	(Spain) (Croatia)	Pablo Abián / Alberto Zapico; Igor Čimbur / Zvonimir Hölbling	21; 15	21; 19
5	(Spain) (Croatia)	Luís Enrique Peñalver / Alvaro Vazquez; Zvonimir Đurkinjak / Filip Špoljarec	21; 16	21; 19

=== Bulgaria vs. Israel ===
Bulgaria
4
Arena Stade Couvert, Court 6
11 February 2020 16:00

Israel
1

			1	2	3
1	(Bulgaria) (Israel)	Daniel Nikolov; Misha Zilberman	12; 21	14; 21
2	(Bulgaria) (Israel)	Dimitar Yanakiev; May Bar Netzer	21; 12	21; 7
3	(Bulgaria) (Israel)	Stilian Makarski; Maxim Grinblat	17; 21	21; 19	21; 15
4	(Bulgaria) (Israel)	Alex Vlaar / Dimitar Yanakiev; Yonathan Levit / Ariel Shainski	21; 10	21; 11
5	(Bulgaria) (Israel)	Peyo Boichinov / Stilian Makarski; May Bar Netzer / Maxim Grinblat	21; 9	21; 12

=== Spain vs. Israel ===
Spain
4
Arena Stade Couvert, Court 7
12 February 2020 09:00

Israel
1

			1	2	3
1	(Spain) (Israel)	Pablo Abián; Yonathan Levit	21; 18	21; 10
2	(Spain) (Israel)	Luís Enrique Peñalver; May Bar Netzer	21; 10	21; 17
3	(Spain) (Israel)	Alvaro Vazquez; Maxim Grinblat	21; 10	21; 17
4	(Spain) (Israel)	Luís Enrique Peñalver / Alberto Zapico; May Bar Netzer / Yonathan Levit	21; 13	21; 15
5	(Spain) (Israel)	Joan Monroy / Carlos Piris; Ariel Shainski / Misha Zilberman	13; 21	21; 19	16; 21

=== Bulgaria vs. Italy ===
Bulgaria
3
Arena Stade Couvert, Court 2
12 February 2020 09:00

Italy
2

			1	2	3
1	(Bulgaria) (Italy)	Daniel Nikolov; Fabio Caponio	19; 21	11; 21
2	(Bulgaria) (Italy)	Dimitar Yanakiev; Enrico Baroni	21; 12	21; 9
3	(Bulgaria) (Italy)	Alex Vlaar; Giovanni Toti	12; 21	21; 13	24; 26
4	(Bulgaria) (Italy)	Peyo Boichinov / Stilian Makarski; Gianmarco Bailetti / David Salutt	21; 15	21; 14
5	(Bulgaria) (Italy)	Alex Vlaar / Dimitar Yanakiev; Giovanni Greco / Kevin Strobl	21; 18	21; 13

=== Spain vs. Italy ===
Spain
4
Arena Stade Couvert, Court 9
12 February 2020 16:00

Italy
1

			1	2	3
1	(Spain) (Italy)	Pablo Abián; Fabio Caponio	21; 11	21; 19
2	(Spain) (Italy)	Luís Enrique Peñalver; Enrico Baroni	21; 16	21; 12
3	(Spain) (Italy)	Alvaro Vazquez; Giovanni Toti	21; 13	21; 16
4	(Spain) (Italy)	Pablo Abián / Alberto Zapico; Giovanni Greco / Kevin Strobl	21; 15	21; 10
5	(Spain) (Italy)	Luís Enrique Peñalver / Alvaro Vazquez; Fabio Caponio / Giovanni Toti	13; 21	19; 21

=== Israel vs. Croatia ===
Israel
0
Arena Stade Couvert, Court 2
12 February 2020 16:00

Croatia
5

			1	2	3
1	(Israel) (Croatia)	Misha Zilberman; Zvonimir Đurkinjak	19; 21	21; 14	22; 24
2	(Israel) (Croatia)	Yonathan Levit; Filip Špoljarec	15; 21	21; 12	21; 23
3	(Israel) (Croatia)	May Bar Netzer; Luka Ban	21; 16	17; 21	9; 21
4	(Israel) (Croatia)	Maxim Grinblat / Yonathan Levit; Igor Čimbur / Zvonimir Hölbling	13; 21	17; 21
5	(Israel) (Croatia)	Ariel Shainski / Misha Zilberman; Zvonimir Đurkinjak / Filip Špoljarec	12; 21	14; 21

=== Spain vs. Bulgaria ===
Spain
2
Arena Stade Couvert, Court 2
13 February 2020 10:00

Bulgaria
3

			1	2	3
1	(Spain) (Bulgaria)	Pablo Abián; Daniel Nikolov	21; 15	21; 16
2	(Spain) (Bulgaria)	Luís Enrique Peñalver; Dimitar Yanakiev	16; 21	5; 21
3	(Spain) (Bulgaria)	Alvaro Vazquez; Stilian Makarski	21; 8	21; 12
4	(Spain) (Bulgaria)	Joan Monroy / Carlos Piris; Alex Vlaar / Dimitar Yanakiev	18; 21	15; 21
5	(Spain) (Bulgaria)	Pablo Abián / Alberto Zapico; Peyo Boichinov / Stilian Makarski	17; 21	18; 21

=== Italy vs. Croatia ===
Italy
4
Arena Stade Couvert, Court 10
13 February 2020 10:00

Croatia
1

			1	2	3
1	(Italy) (Croatia)	Fabio Caponio; Zvonimir Đurkinjak	17; 21	16; 21
2	(Italy) (Croatia)	Enrico Baroni; Filip Špoljarec	21; 13	21; 19
3	(Italy) (Croatia)	Giovanni Toti; Luka Ban	21; 14	21; 23	21; 18
4	(Italy) (Croatia)	Gianmarco Bailetti / David Salutt; Igor Čimbur / Zvonimir Hölbling	21; 17	22; 20
5	(Italy) (Croatia)	Fabio Caponio / Giovanni Toti; Zvonimir Đurkinjak / Filip Špoljarec	2; 0			retired
