= Belarus national badminton team =

National badminton team representing Belarus

Belarus
- Association: Belarusian Badminton Federation (BFB)
- Confederation: BE (Europe)
- President: Petrash Aliaksander

BWF ranking
- Current ranking: Unranked (2 January 2024)
- Highest ranking: 46 (7 January 2013)

Sudirman Cup
- Appearances: 5 (first in 1995)
- Best result: Group stage

European Mixed Team Championships
- Appearances: 3 (first in 2009)
- Best result: Group stage

European Men's Team Championships
- Appearances: 2 (first in 2004)
- Best result: Group stage

European Women's Team Championships
- Appearances: 7 (first in 2006)
- Best result: Group stage

Helvetia Cup
- Appearances: 4 (first in 1997)
- Best result: Group stage

The Belarus national badminton team (Belarusian: Зборная Беларусі па бадмінтону) represents Belarus in international badminton team competitions. The Belarusian team is managed by the Belarusian Badminton Federation (BBF) which organizes badminton championships and prepares Belarusian national badminton teams. The team was formed in 1992 after the association was found.

Belarusian-born player, Nadieżda Kostiuczyk won Belarus a gold medal at the European Junior Badminton Championships along with compatriot Olga Roj. Belarus made its badminton debut in the 1996 Summer Olympics. Mikhail Korchouk and Vlada Tcherniavskaia were the first few players to represent Belarus in Olympic badminton.

== History ==
Badminton was first played in the 1960s in Belarus. The Belarusian Badminton Federation was established in 1962 and the Belarusian team then competed in the USSR National Badminton Championships. Belarus once hosted the USSR National Badminton Championships in early 1962 in Minsk. The first Belarusian Republic Championships were hosted in November 1962 in Mogilev to pick the best players for the Belarusian team.

After the dissolution of the Soviet Union in 1991, the national team started to compete in international team events. The team made one of their first international appearances at the 1995 Sudirman Cup. The team then became part of Badminton Europe and started to compete in the European Badminton Championships team events since the 2000s.

In 2022, after the Russian invasion of Ukraine, the Badminton World Federation (BWF) banned all Belarusian players and officials from BWF events, and cancelled all BWF tournaments in Belarus. On 29 August 2023, BWF announced that Belarusian athletes will be allowed to compete as neutrals starting 26 February 2024.

=== Men's team ===
The Belarusian men's team competed in the 1994 Thomas Cup qualifying rounds. The team topped their group in the first round and advanced to the second round. The team then lost 5–0 to Russia and Denmark in the second round. The team then failed to advance to the semi-finals again for the 1996 Thomas Cup qualifiers. In the qualifiers for the 1998 Thomas Cup, the team won 3–2 against Peru and 5–0 against Greece but lost to the United States 5–0 in the first stage.

The Belarusian men's team made their first appearance at the European Men's Team Championships in 2006. The team were grouped with Germany, Portugal and Finland but were eliminated in the group stages after losing 5–0 to all three teams.

=== Women's team ===
The Belarusian women's team took part in qualifying for the 1994 Uber Cup. Although the team did not get past the first stage, they managed to defeat South Africa 4–1 in the group. In 1998, the team tried to qualify for the 1998 Uber Cup. The team almost advanced to the second stage after beating Czech Republic and Belgium 5–0 and almost defeating Norway.

The Belarus women's team competed in the 2006 European Women's Team Championships. The team were eliminated in the group stages. The team then competed in the 2020 European Women's Team Badminton Championships. The team placed third in the group after winning 3–2 against Israel.

=== Mixed team ===
The Belarusian mixed team first competed in the 1995 Sudirman Cup. The team performed decently and topped Group 9 to finish in 35th place. The team then competed in the 1997 Helvetia Cup and achieved 13th place. In 2001, the team finished in 5th place at the 2001 Helvetia Cup. The mixed team made their first European Mixed Team Badminton Championships appearance in 2009. The team placed second in the group after winning 5–0 against Latvia and Norway.

== Competitive record ==
=== Thomas Cup ===
Year	Round	Pos
1949	Part of the Soviet Union	
1952	Part of the Soviet Union	
1955	Part of the Soviet Union	
1958	Part of the Soviet Union	
1961	Part of the Soviet Union	
1964	Part of the Soviet Union	
1967	Part of the Soviet Union	
1970	Part of the Soviet Union	
1973	Part of the Soviet Union	
1976	Part of the Soviet Union	
1979	Part of the Soviet Union	
1982	Part of the Soviet Union	
1984	Part of the Soviet Union	
1986	Part of the Soviet Union	
1988	Part of the Soviet Union	
1990	Part of the Soviet Union	
1992	Part of the CIS	
1994	Did not qualify	
1996	Did not qualify	
1998	Did not qualify	
2000	Did not enter	
2002	Did not enter	
2004	Did not qualify	
2006	Did not qualify	
2008	Did not enter	
2010	Did not enter	
2012	Did not enter	
2014	Did not enter	
2016	Did not enter	
2018	Did not enter	
2020	Did not enter	
2022	Banned	
2024	Banned	
2026	TBD	
2028	TBD	
2030	TBD	

=== Uber Cup ===
Year	Round	Pos
1957	Part of the Soviet Union	
1960	Part of the Soviet Union	
1963	Part of the Soviet Union	
1966	Part of the Soviet Union	
1969	Part of the Soviet Union	
1972	Part of the Soviet Union	
1975	Part of the Soviet Union	
1978	Part of the Soviet Union	
1981	Part of the Soviet Union	
1984	Part of the Soviet Union	
1986	Part of the Soviet Union	
1988	Part of the Soviet Union	
1990	Part of the Soviet Union	
1992	Part of the CIS	
1994	Did not qualify	
1996	Did not qualify	
1998	Did not qualify	
2000	Did not qualify	
2002	Did not enter	
2004	Did not enter	
2006	Did not qualify	
2008	Did not qualify	
2010	Did not qualify	
2012	Did not qualify	
2014	Did not enter	
2016	Did not qualify	
2018	Did not qualify	
2020	Did not qualify	
2022	Banned	
2024	Banned	
2026	TBD	
2028	TBD	
2030	TBD	

=== Sudirman Cup ===
Year	Round	Pos
1989	Part of the Soviet Union	
1991	Part of the Soviet Union	
1993	Did not enter	
1995	Group stage	35th
1997	Group stage	31st
1999	Group stage	29th
2001	Group stage	33rd
2003	Did not enter	
2005	Did not enter	
2007	Group stage	43rd
2009	Did not enter	
2011	Did not enter	
2013	Did not enter	
2015	Did not enter	
2017	Did not enter	
2019	Did not enter	
2021	Did not enter	
2023	Banned	
2025	TBD	
2027	TBD	
2029	TBD	

=== European Team Championships ===
==== Men's team ====
Year	Round	Pos
2004	Group stage	27th
2006	Group stage	
2008	Did not enter	
2010	Did not enter	
2012	Did not enter	
2014	Did not enter	
2016	Did not enter	
2018	Did not enter	
2020	Did not enter	
2024	Banned	
2026	TBD	
2028	TBD	
2030	TBD	

==== Women's team ====
Year	Round	Pos
2004	Did not enter	
2006	Group stage	
2008	Group stage	
2010	Group stage	
2012	Group stage	
2014	Did not enter	
2016	Group stage	
2018	Group stage	
2020	Group stage	
2024	Banned	
2026	TBD	
2028	TBD	
2030	TBD	

==== Mixed team ====
Year	Round	Pos
1972	Part of the Soviet Union	
1974	Part of the Soviet Union	
1976	Part of the Soviet Union	
1978	Part of the Soviet Union	
1980	Part of the Soviet Union	
1982	Part of the Soviet Union	
1984	Part of the Soviet Union	
1986	Part of the Soviet Union	
1988	Part of the Soviet Union	
1990	Part of the Soviet Union	
1992	Part of the CIS	
1994	Did not enter	
1996	Did not enter	
1998	Did not qualify	
2000	Did not enter	
2002	Did not qualify	
2004	Did not qualify	
2006	Did not qualify	
2008	Did not enter	
2009	Group stage	
2011	Group stage	
2013	Group stage	
2015	Did not qualify	
2017	Did not enter	
2019	Did not enter	
2021	Did not enter	
2023	Banned	
2025	TBD	
2027	TBD	
2029	TBD	

=== Helvetia Cup ===
Year	Round	Pos
1962	Part of the Soviet Union	
1963	Part of the Soviet Union	
1964	Part of the Soviet Union	
1965	Part of the Soviet Union	
1966	Part of the Soviet Union	
1967	Part of the Soviet Union	
1968	Part of the Soviet Union	
1969	Part of the Soviet Union	
1970	Part of the Soviet Union	
1971	Part of the Soviet Union	
1973	Part of the Soviet Union	
1975	Part of the Soviet Union	
1977	Part of the Soviet Union	
1979	Part of the Soviet Union	
1981	Part of the Soviet Union	
1983	Part of the Soviet Union	
1985	Part of the Soviet Union	
1987	Part of the Soviet Union	
1989	Part of the Soviet Union	
1991	Part of the Soviet Union	
1993	Did not enter	
1995	Did not enter	
1997	Group stage	13th
1999	Did not enter	
2001	Group stage	5th
2003	Group stage	7th
2005	Group stage	8th
2007	Did not enter	

**Red border color indicates tournament was held on home soil.

== Junior competitive record ==
=== Suhandinata Cup ===
Year	Round	Pos
2000	Did not enter	
2002	Did not enter	
2004	Did not enter	
2006	Did not enter	
2007	Did not enter	
2008	Did not enter	
2009	Did not enter	
2010	Did not enter	
2011	Did not enter	
2012	Did not enter	
2013	Did not enter	
2014	Did not enter	
2015	Did not enter	
2016	Group stage	24th
2017	Did not enter	
2018	Did not enter	
2019	Group stage	31st
2022	Banned	
2023	Banned	
2024	Banned	

=== European Junior Team Championships ===
==== Mixed team ====
Year	Round	Pos
1975	Part of the Soviet Union	
1977	Part of the Soviet Union	
1979	Part of the Soviet Union	
1981	Part of the Soviet Union	
1983	Part of the Soviet Union	
1985	Part of the Soviet Union	
1987	Part of the Soviet Union	
1989	Part of the Soviet Union	
1991	Part of the Soviet Union	
1993	Did not enter	
1995	Did not enter	
1997	Did not qualify	
1999	Did not qualify	
2001	Did not qualify	
2003	Did not qualify	
2005	Did not qualify	
2007	Did not qualify	
2009	Did not enter	
2011	Did not enter	
2013	Did not enter	
2015	Did not enter	
2017	Did not enter	
2018	Did not enter	
2020	Did not enter	
2022	Banned	
2024	Banned	

=== Finlandia Cup ===
==== Mixed team ====
Year	Round	Pos
1984	Part of the Soviet Union	
1986	Part of the Soviet Union	
1988	Part of the Soviet Union	
1990	Part of the Soviet Union	
1992	Part of the CIS	
1994	Did not enter	
1996	Group stage	9th
1998	Group stage	5th
2000	Group stage	6th
2002	Group stage	9th
2004	Group stage	11th
2006	Group stage	13th

**Red border color indicates tournament was held on home soil.

== Staff ==
The following list shows the coaching staff for the Belarus national badminton team.

Name	Role
(Belarus) Vlada Chernyavskaya	Head coach

== Players ==
=== Current squad ===
As of 2 January 2024

==== Men's team ====
Name	DoB/Age	Ranking of event		
Name	DoB/Age	MS	MD	XD
Aliaksandr Aliaksandrovich	12 March 2003 (age 22)	–	–	–
Uladzimir Kryvasheyeu	12 March 2003 (age 22)	–	–	–
Ilya Larushyn	23 April 2001 (age 23)	–	–	–
Alaksei Kniazeu	27 October 2001 (age 23)	–	–	–
Hleb Shvydkou	8 June 2005 (age 19)	–	–	–

==== Women's team ====
Name	DoB/Age	Ranking of event		
Name	DoB/Age	WS	WD	XD
Aliaksandra Vasileuskaya	22 July 2003 (age 21)	–	–	–
Maryna Yanbayeva	24 June 2004 (age 20)	–	–	–
Julia Bitsoukova	19 September 1999 (age 25)	–	–	–
Maryana Viarbitskaya	18 September 1998 (age 26)	–	–	–
Julia Bitsukova	19 January 1999 (age 26)	–	–	–

=== Previous squads ===
==== European Team Championships ====
- Women's team: 2020
