= Belgium national badminton team =

National badminton team representing Belgium

Belgium
- Association: Royal Belgian Badminton Federation (RBBF)
- Confederation: BE (Europe)
- President: Sven Serré

BWF ranking
- Current ranking: 33 (2 January 2024)
- Highest ranking: 23 (4 April 2023)

Sudirman Cup
- Appearances: 7 (first in 1993)
- Best result: Group stage

European Mixed Team Championships
- Appearances: 14 (first in 1976)
- Best result: Group stage

European Men's Team Championships
- Appearances: 6 (first in 2006)
- Best result: Group stage

European Women's Team Championships
- Appearances: 5 (first in 2008)
- Best result: Group stage

Helvetia Cup
- Appearances: 23 (first in 1962)
- Best result: Runners-up (1964)

The Belgium national badminton team (Dutch: Belgisch nationaal badmintonteam; French: Équipe nationale belge de badminton; German: Belgische badminton-nationalmannschaft) represents Belgium in international badminton team competitions and is controlled by the Royal Belgian Badminton Federation. The Belgium national team have never qualified for the Thomas Cup and the Uber Cup. The last time Belgium competed in the Sudirman Cup was in 2007.

Belgium made their international team competition debut when the national mixed team competed in the 1962 Helvetia Cup. The team has had multiple podium positions at the Helvetia Cup. The Belgian junior team competed in the Finlandia Cup and were runners-up in 2002.

== History ==
The Belgian national team was formed in 1949 after the establishment of the Royal Belgian Badminton Federation. The first national championships were also held in 1949.

=== Men's team ===
The Belgian men's team first competed in the 2006 European Men's Team Badminton Championships. The team finished third in group after winning 4–1 against Estonia and were eliminated in the group stages after losing 3–2 to Russia and 5–0 to Poland. In the next edition of the championships in 2008, the team finished last in their group after losing to Poland, Portugal and Bulgaria.

In the 2020 European Men's Team Badminton Championships, the team were close to qualifying for the quarter-finals of the championships. The team won 4–1 against their Turkish opponents and 5–0 against Hungary. They failed to become the champions of the group stage after losing 5–0 against France.

=== Women's team ===
The Belgian women's team competed in the 2008 European Women's Team Badminton Championships. The team lost 5–0 to Russia and 4–1 to Finland. They finished third in the group after defeating Ireland 4–1. The team failed to enter the quarter-finals of the 2010 European Men's Team Badminton Championships even after finishing second in their group in the group stages.

The team then competed in the 2020 European Men's Team Badminton Championships. The team lost 5–0 to Russia but won against Iceland and Lithuania to finish second in their group.

=== Mixed team ===
The Belgian mixed team first took part in the 1962 Helvetia Cup. The team finished in fourth place after defeating Switzerland. The team then went on to finish third in the 1963 Helvetia Cup and then became runners-up in the next edition of the championships. The team finished in third place again in the 1974 Helvetia Cup. The mixed team then made their first appearance in the European Mixed Team Badminton Championships in 1976 and finished in 13th place.

In 2015, Belgium hosted the 2015 European Mixed Team Badminton Championships which granted the national team qualification for the tournament. The team were grouped with England and Ireland in Group 2. The team finished last in their group after losing 3–2 to Ireland and 5–0 to England.

== Competitive record ==
=== Thomas Cup ===
| Year | Round | Pos |
|---|---|---|
| 1949 | Did not enter | |
| 1952 | Did not enter | |
| 1955 | Did not qualify | |
| 1958 | Did not enter | |
| 1961 | Did not enter | |
| 1964 | Did not qualify | |
| 1967 | Did not enter | |
| 1970 | Did not enter | |
| 1973 | Did not enter | |
| 1976 | Did not enter | |
| 1979 | Did not qualify | |
| 1982 | Did not enter | |
| 1984 | Did not qualify | |
| 1986 | Did not qualify | |
| 1988 | Did not qualify | |
| 1990 | Did not qualify | |
| 1992 | Did not qualify | |
| 1994 | Did not qualify | |
| 1996 | Did not qualify | |
| 1998 | Did not qualify | |
| 2000 | Did not qualify | |
| 2002 | Did not qualify | |
| 2004 | Did not qualify | |
| 2006 | Did not qualify | |
| 2008 | Did not qualify | |
| 2010 | Did not enter | |
| 2012 | Did not qualify | |
| 2014 | Did not qualify | |
| 2016 | Did not qualify | |
| 2018 | Did not qualify | |
| 2020 | Did not qualify | |
| 2022 | Did not enter | |
| 2024 | Did not enter | |
| 2026 | Did not qualify | |
| 2028 | TBD | |
| 2030 | TBD | |

=== Uber Cup ===
| Year | Round | Pos |
|---|---|---|
| 1957 | Did not enter | |
| 1960 | Did not enter | |
| 1963 | Did not enter | |
| 1966 | Did not enter | |
| 1969 | Did not enter | |
| 1972 | Did not enter | |
| 1975 | Did not enter | |
| 1978 | Did not enter | |
| 1981 | Did not enter | |
| 1984 | Did not qualify | |
| 1986 | Did not qualify | |
| 1988 | Did not qualify | |
| 1990 | Did not qualify | |
| 1992 | Did not qualify | |
| 1994 | Did not qualify | |
| 1996 | Did not qualify | |
| 1998 | Did not qualify | |
| 2000 | Did not enter | |
| 2002 | Did not qualify | |
| 2004 | Did not enter | |
| 2006 | Did not enter | |
| 2008 | Did not qualify | |
| 2010 | Did not qualify | |
| 2012 | Did not qualify | |
| 2014 | Did not qualify | |
| 2016 | Did not qualify | |
| 2018 | Did not enter | |
| 2020 | Did not qualify | |
| 2022 | Did not enter | |
| 2024 | Did not enter | |
| 2026 | Did not qualify | |
| 2028 | TBD | |
| 2030 | TBD | |

=== Sudirman Cup ===
| Year | Round | Pos |
|---|---|---|
| 1989 | Did not enter | |
| 1991 | Did not enter | |
| 1993 | Group stage | 34th |
| 1995 | Group stage | 33rd |
| 1997 | Group stage | 38th |
| 1999 | Group stage | 32nd |
| 2001 | Group stage | 34th |
| 2003 | Group stage | 29th |
| 2005 | Did not enter | |
| 2007 | Group stage | 42nd |
| 2009 | Did not enter | |
| 2011 | Did not enter | |
| 2013 | Did not enter | |
| 2015 | Did not enter | |
| 2017 | Did not enter | |
| 2019 | Did not enter | |
| 2021 | Did not enter | |
| 2023 | Did not enter | |
| 2025 | TBD | |
| 2027 | TBD | |
| 2029 | TBD | |

=== European Team Championships ===
==== Men's team ====
| Year | Round | Pos |
|---|---|---|
| 2004 | Group stage | 11th |
| 2006 | Group stage | |
| 2008 | Group stage | |
| 2010 | Did not enter | |
| 2012 | Group stage | |
| 2014 | Group stage | |
| 2016 | Group stage | |
| 2018 | Group stage | |
| 2020 | Group stage | |
| 2024 | Did not qualify | |
| 2026 | Did not qualify | |
| 2028 | To be determined | |
| 2030 | To be determined | |

==== Women's team ====
| Year | Round | Pos |
|---|---|---|
| 2004 | Did not enter | |
| 2006 | Did not enter | |
| 2008 | Group stage | |
| 2010 | Group stage | |
| 2012 | Group stage | |
| 2014 | Group stage | |
| 2016 | Group stage | |
| 2018 | Did not enter | |
| 2020 | Group stage | |
| 2024 | Did not qualify | |
| 2026 | Did not qualify | |
| 2028 | To be determined | |
| 2030 | To be determined | |

==== Mixed team ====
| Year | Round | Pos |
|---|---|---|
| 1972 | Did not enter | |
| 1974 | Did not enter | |
| 1976 | Group stage | 13th |
| 1978 | Group stage | 12th |
| 1980 | Group stage | 12th |
| 1982 | Group stage | 14th |
| 1984 | Group stage | 12th |
| 1986 | Group stage | 11th |
| 1988 | Group stage | 10th |
| 1990 | Group stage | 13th |
| 1992 | Group stage | 18th |
| 1994 | Group stage | 19th |
| 1996 | Did not qualify | |
| 1998 | Did not qualify | |
| 2000 | Did not qualify | |
| 2002 | Did not qualify | |
| 2004 | Did not qualify | |
| 2006 | Did not qualify | |
| 2008 | Did not qualify | |
| 2009 | Group stage | |
| 2011 | Group stage | |
| 2013 | Group stage | |
| 2015 | Group stage | |
| 2017 | Did not enter | |
| 2019 | Did not qualify | |
| 2021 | Did not qualify | |
| 2023 | Did not qualify | |
| 2025 | Did not qualify | |
| 2027 | TBD | |
| 2029 | TBD | |

=== Helvetia Cup ===
| Year | Round | Pos |
|---|---|---|
| 1962 | Fourth place | 4th |
| 1963 | Third place | 3rd |
| 1964 | Runners-up | 2nd |
| 1965 | Fourth place | 4th |
| 1966 | Fourth place | 4th |
| 1967 | Fourth place | 4th |
| 1968 | Group stage | 5th |
| 1969 | Did not enter | |
| 1970 | Did not enter | |
| 1971 | Third place | 3rd |
| 1973 | Group stage | 9th |
| 1975 | Group stage | 6th |
| 1977 | Group stage | 9th |
| 1979 | Group stage | 12th |
| 1981 | Did not enter | |
| 1983 | Did not enter | |
| 1985 | Fourth place | 4th |
| 1987 | Group stage | 8th |
| 1989 | Group stage | 12th |
| 1991 | Did not enter | |
| 1993 | Group stage | 12th |
| 1995 | Group stage | 10th |
| 1997 | Group stage | 10th |
| 1999 | Group stage | 7th |
| 2001 | Group stage | 10th |
| 2003 | Group stage | 5th |
| 2005 | Fourth place | 4th |
| 2007 | Group stage | 8th |

=== Plume d'Or ===
| Year | Round | Pos |
|---|---|---|
| 1972 | Runners-up | 2nd |
| 1973 | Runners-up | 2nd |
| 1974 | Champions | 1st |
| 1976 | Runners-up | 2nd |
| 1977 | Third place | 3rd |
| 1978 | Runners-up | 2nd |
| 1979 | Champions | 1st |
| 1980 | Champions | 1st |
| 1981 | Champions | 1st |
| 1982 | Fourth place | 4th |
| 1984 | Runners-up | 2nd |
| 1985 | Third place | 3rd |
| 1986 | Third place | 3rd |
| 1987 | Fourth place | 4th |
| 1988 | Third place | 3rd |
| 1989 | Did not enter | |
| 1990 | Third place | 3rd |
| 1991 | Third place | 3rd |
| 1992 | Third place | 3rd |
| 1993 | Third place | 3rd |
| 1994 | Fourth place | 4th |

**Red border color indicates tournament was held on home soil.

== Junior competitive record ==
=== Suhandinata Cup ===
| Year | Round | Pos |
|---|---|---|
| 2000 | Did not enter | |
| 2002 | Did not enter | |
| 2004 | Did not enter | |
| 2006 | Did not enter | |
| 2007 | Did not enter | |
| 2008 | Did not enter | |
| 2009 | Did not enter | |
| 2010 | Did not enter | |
| 2011 | Did not enter | |
| 2012 | Group stage | 22nd |
| 2013 | Did not enter | |
| 2014 | Did not enter | |
| 2015 | Did not enter | |
| 2016 | Group stage | 29th |
| 2017 | Group stage | 16th |
| 2018 | Did not enter | |
| 2019 | Did not enter | |
| 2022 | Group stage | 30th |
| 2023 | Group stage | 23rd |
| 2024 | TBD | |

=== European Junior Team Championships ===
==== Mixed team ====
| Year | Round | Pos |
|---|---|---|
| 1975 | Did not enter | |
| 1977 | Did not enter | |
| 1979 | Group stage | 13th |
| 1981 | Group stage | 11th |
| 1983 | Group stage | 13th |
| 1985 | Group stage | 16th |
| 1987 | Group stage | 16th |
| 1989 | Group stage | 18th |
| 1991 | Group stage | 18th |
| 1993 | Group stage | 21st |
| 1995 | Did not qualify | |
| 1997 | Did not qualify | |
| 1999 | Did not qualify | |
| 2001 | Did not qualify | |
| 2003 | Group stage | 14th |
| 2005 | Did not qualify | |
| 2007 | Did not enter | |
| 2009 | Group stage | |
| 2011 | Group stage | |
| 2013 | Group stage | |
| 2015 | Group stage | |
| 2017 | Group stage | |
| 2018 | Group stage | |
| 2020 | Did not enter | |
| 2022 | Group stage | |
| 2024 | Group stage | |

=== Finlandia Cup ===
==== Mixed team ====
| Year | Round | Pos |
|---|---|---|
| 1984 | Group stage | 10th |
| 1986 | Group stage | 10th |
| 1988 | Group stage | 9th |
| 1990 | Group stage | 9th |
| 1992 | Group stage | 10th |
| 1994 | Group stage | 10th |
| 1996 | Fourth place | 4th |
| 1998 | Group stage | 9th |
| 2000 | Group stage | 12th |
| 2002 | Runners-up | 2nd |
| 2004 | Group stage | 15th |
| 2006 | Did not enter | |

**Red border color indicates tournament was held on home soil.

== Players ==
=== Current squad ===
As of 2 January 2024

==== Men's team ====
| Name | DoB/Age | Ranking of event | | |
| Name | DoB/Age | MS | MD | XD |
|---|---|---|---|---|
| Julien Carraggi | 2 July 2000 (age 25) | 46 | 1324 | - |
| Elias Bracke | 26 September 1998 (age 27) | 188 | 1347 | - |
| Charles Fouyn | 1 June 2005 (age 20) | 309 | 1324 | - |
| Yaro van Delsen | 25 June 2003 (age 22) | 425 | 245 | - |
| Iljo van Delsen | 25 June 2003 (age 22) | 1007 | 245 | - |
| Senne Houthoofd | 18 September 2001 (age 24) | 768 | 1347 | 282 |
| Baptiste Rolin | 17 February 2005 (age 21) | 672 | 1350 | - |
| Adrien Slegers | 9 July 2001 (age 24) | - | - | - |
| Pepijn van Rossom | 13 January 2006 (age 20) | - | - | - |
| Raphael Maho | 23 August 2006 (age 19) | - | - | - |

==== Women's team ====
| Name | DoB/Age | Ranking of event | | |
| Name | DoB/Age | WS | WD | XD |
|---|---|---|---|---|
| Lianne Tan | 20 November 1990 (age 35) | 48 | - | - |
| Clara Lassaux | 4 October 2001 (age 24) | 143 | 914 | - |
| Lien Lammertyn | 21 November 2003 (age 22) | 652 | 445 | - |
| Karla Henry | 29 June 2004 (age 21) | 363 | - | - |
| Lise Jaques | 10 September 1998 (age 27) | - | 445 | - |
| Flore Vandenhoucke | 15 March 1995 (age 30) | - | - | - |
| Tammi van Wonterghem | 5 March 2007 (age 18) | 1035 | 935 | - |
| Amber Boonen | 30 November 2006 (age 19) | 944 | 935 | - |
| Kirstin Boonen | 15 May 2005 (age 20) | - | - | - |
| Siebelijn de Sutter | 8 April 2003 (age 22) | - | - | - |

=== Previous squads ===
==== European Team Championships ====
- Men's team: 2020
- Women's team: 2020
