= 2020 European Men's and Women's Team Badminton Championships =

Tournament details
- Dates: 11–16 February
- Edition: 8
- Venue: Arena Stade Couvert
- Location: Liévin, France

The 2020 edition of the European Men's and Women's Team Badminton Championships was held in Liévin, France, from 11 to 16 February 2020. This tournament also serves as European qualification for the 2020 Thomas & Uber Cup.

== Medalists ==
Event	Gold	Silver	Bronze
Men's Team	Denmark; Anders Antonsen; Kim Astrup; Viktor Axelsen; Mathias Boe; Mads Conrad-Petersen; Jan Ø. Jørgensen; Carsten Mogensen; Anders Skaarup Rasmussen; Frederik Søgaard; Hans-Kristian Vittinghus	Netherlands; Finn Achthoven; Jacco Arends; Mark Caljouw; Nick Fransman; Ruben Jille; Joran Kweekel; Jelle Maas; Robin Tabeling; Wessel van der Aar; Ties van der Lecq	Russia; Rodion Alimov; Denis Grachev; Vladimir Ivanov; Georgii Karpov; Nikita Khakimov; Pavel Kotsarenko; Georgii Lebedev; Vladimir Malkov; Sergey Sirant; Ivan Sozonov; Alexandr Zinchenko
Men's Team	Denmark; Anders Antonsen; Kim Astrup; Viktor Axelsen; Mathias Boe; Mads Conrad-Petersen; Jan Ø. Jørgensen; Carsten Mogensen; Anders Skaarup Rasmussen; Frederik Søgaard; Hans-Kristian Vittinghus	Netherlands; Finn Achthoven; Jacco Arends; Mark Caljouw; Nick Fransman; Ruben Jille; Joran Kweekel; Jelle Maas; Robin Tabeling; Wessel van der Aar; Ties van der Lecq	France; Eloi Adam; Lucas Claerbout; Samy Corvée; Fabien Delrue; Thom Gicquel; Ronan Labar; Brice Leverdez; Julien Maio; Arnaud Merklé; Christo Popov; Toma Junior Popov; William Villeger
Women's Team	Denmark; Mia Blichfeldt; Alexandra Bøje; Line Christophersen; Maiken Fruergaard; Julie Dawall Jakobsen; Line Kjærsfeldt; Amalie Magelund; Mette Poulsen; Freja Ravn; Sara Thygesen	Germany; Fabienne Deprez; Linda Efler; Isabel Herttrich; Annabella Jäger; Lara Käpplein; Stine Küspert; Yvonne Li; Emma Moszczynski; Kilasu Ostermeyer; Ann-Kathrin Spöri; Franziska Volkmann; Miranda Wilson	France; Marie Batomene; Sharone Bauer; Ophélia Casier; Delphine Delrue; Vimala Hériau; Yaëlle Hoyaux; Léonice Huet; Margot Lambert; Juliette Moinard; Lea Palermo; Qi Xuefei; Anne Tran
Women's Team	Denmark; Mia Blichfeldt; Alexandra Bøje; Line Christophersen; Maiken Fruergaard; Julie Dawall Jakobsen; Line Kjærsfeldt; Amalie Magelund; Mette Poulsen; Freja Ravn; Sara Thygesen	Germany; Fabienne Deprez; Linda Efler; Isabel Herttrich; Annabella Jäger; Lara Käpplein; Stine Küspert; Yvonne Li; Emma Moszczynski; Kilasu Ostermeyer; Ann-Kathrin Spöri; Franziska Volkmann; Miranda Wilson	Scotland; Rachel Andrew; Kirsty Gilmour; Julie MacPherson; Lauren Middleton; Holly Newall; Eleanor O'Donnell; Rachel Sugden; Ciara Torrance

== Tournament ==
The 2020 European Men's and Women's Team Badminton Championships officially crowned the best male and female national teams in Europe and at the same time worked as the European qualification event towards the 2020 Thomas & Uber Cup finals. 63 teams consisting of 34 men's team and 29 women's team entered the tournament.

=== Venue ===
This tournament was held at Arena Stade Couvert in Liévin, France.

=== Seeds ===
The defending Champions, Denmark, were top seeded for both men's and women's team, while the host country France were seeded third.

- Men's team
1. Denmark
2. England
3. France
4. Russia
5. Germany
6. Netherlands
7. Finland
8. Spain
- Women's team
1. Denmark
2. Russia
3. France
4. Germany
5. Bulgaria
6. Turkey
7. Spain

=== Draw ===
The draw was held on 3 December 2019. The men's team group stage consisted of six groups with four teams in each and two groups with five teams in each. The women's team group stage consisted of six groups with four teams in each and one group with five teams.

- Men's team

Group 1	Group 2	Group 3	Group 4	Group 5	Group 6	Group 7	Group 8
Denmark; Wales; Latvia; Switzerland	England; Estonia; Greenland; Sweden	France; Hungary; Turkey; Belgium	Russia; Austria; Ireland; Poland	Germany; Czech Republic; Azerbaijan; Iceland	Netherlands; Slovakia; Luxembourg; Lithuania	Finland; Slovenia; Portugal; Norway; Ukraine	Spain; Bulgaria; Italy; Israel; Croatia

- Women's team

Group 1	Group 2	Group 3	Group 4	Group 5	Group 6	Group 7
Denmark; Netherlands; Ireland; Estonia	Russia; Belgium; Iceland; Lithuania	France; England; Belarus; Israel	Germany; Slovakia; Portugal; Latvia	Bulgaria; Ukraine; Hungary; Wales	Turkey; Finland; Slovenia; Czech Republic	Spain; Poland; Scotland; Norway; Sweden

== Men's team ==
=== Format ===
In each group, teams played each other once. The eight group winners qualified for the knockout stage.

=== Groups ===
==== Group 1 ====
Pos	Team	Pld	W	L	MF	MA	MD	GF	GA	GD	PF	PA	PD	Pts	Qualification	Denmark	Switzerland	Wales	Latvia
1	Denmark	3	3	0	15	0	+15	30	0	+30	630	255	+375	3	Knockout stage	—	5–0	5–0	5–0
2	Switzerland	3	2	1	10	5	+5	20	11	+9	545	462	+83	2			—	5–0	5–0
3	Wales	3	1	2	4	11	−7	10	22	−12	455	606	−151	1				—	4–1
4	Latvia	3	0	3	1	14	−13	2	29	−27	343	650	−307	0					—

Source: TS

==== Group 2 ====
Pos	Team	Pld	W	L	MF	MA	MD	GF	GA	GD	PF	PA	PD	Pts	Qualification	England	Sweden	Estonia	Greenland
1	England	3	3	0	13	2	+11	27	6	+21	655	419	+236	3	Knockout stage	—	4–1	4–1	5–0
2	Sweden	3	2	1	9	6	+3	19	13	+6	573	496	+77	2			—	3–2	5–0
3	Estonia	3	1	2	8	7	+1	18	15	+3	581	536	+45	1				—	5–0
4	Greenland	3	0	3	0	15	−15	0	30	−30	272	630	−358	0					—

Source: TS

==== Group 3 ====
Pos	Team	Pld	W	L	MF	MA	MD	GF	GA	GD	PF	PA	PD	Pts	Qualification	France	Belgium	Turkey	Hungary
1	France (H)	3	3	0	15	0	+15	30	1	+29	651	352	+299	3	Knockout stage	—	5–0	5–0	5–0
2	Belgium	3	2	1	9	6	+3	18	16	+2	610	583	+27	2			—	4–1	5–0
3	Turkey	3	1	2	5	10	−5	13	22	−9	599	652	−53	1				—	4–1
4	Hungary	3	0	3	1	14	−13	6	28	−22	420	693	−273	0					—

Source: TS
(H) Host

==== Group 4 ====
Pos	Team	Pld	W	L	MF	MA	MD	GF	GA	GD	PF	PA	PD	Pts	Qualification	Russia	Austria	Ireland	Poland
1	Russia	3	3	0	14	1	+13	28	5	+23	676	514	+162	3	Knockout stage	—	5–0	5–0	4–1
2	Austria	3	2	1	6	9	−3	14	20	−6	598	622	−24	2			—	3–2	3–2
3	Ireland	3	1	2	6	9	−3	16	19	−3	671	637	+34	1				—	4–1
4	Poland	3	0	3	4	11	−7	9	23	−14	471	643	−172	0					—

Source: TS

==== Group 5 ====
Pos	Team	Pld	W	L	MF	MA	MD	GF	GA	GD	PF	PA	PD	Pts	Qualification	Germany	Czech Republic	Iceland	Azerbaijan
1	Germany	3	3	0	15	0	+15	30	2	+28	670	421	+249	3	Knockout stage	—	5–0	5–0	5–0
2	Czech Republic	3	2	1	10	5	+5	21	13	+8	637	555	+82	2			—	5–0	5–0
3	Iceland	3	1	2	3	12	−9	9	25	−16	473	656	−183	1				—	3–2
4	Azerbaijan	3	0	3	2	13	−11	6	26	−20	471	619	−148	0					—

Source: TS

==== Group 6 ====
Pos	Team	Pld	W	L	MF	MA	MD	GF	GA	GD	PF	PA	PD	Pts	Qualification	Netherlands	Slovakia	Lithuania	Luxembourg
1	Netherlands	3	3	0	15	0	+15	30	1	+29	649	345	+304	3	Knockout stage	—	5–0	5–0	5–0
2	Slovakia	3	2	1	10	5	+5	20	10	+10	549	492	+57	2			—	5–0	5–0
3	Lithuania	3	1	2	5	10	−5	11	21	−10	492	604	−112	1				—	5–0
4	Luxembourg	3	0	3	0	15	−15	1	30	−29	394	643	−249	0					—

Source: TS

==== Group 7 ====
Pos	Team	Pld	W	L	MF	MA	MD	GF	GA	GD	PF	PA	PD	Pts	Qualification	Ukraine	Finland	Norway	Slovenia	Portugal
1	Ukraine	4	4	0	17	3	+14	36	9	+27	878	698	+180	4	Knockout stage	—	4–1	5–0	5–0	3–2
2	Finland	4	3	1	15	5	+10	32	13	+19	897	699	+198	3			—	4–1	5–0	5–0
3	Norway	4	2	2	9	11	−2	20	27	−7	788	873	−85	2				—	4–1	4–1
4	Slovenia	4	1	3	4	16	−12	10	34	−24	697	881	−184	1					—	3–2
5	Portugal	4	0	4	5	15	−10	17	32	−15	814	923	−109	0						—

Source: TS

==== Group 8 ====
Pos	Team	Pld	W	L	MF	MA	MD	GF	GA	GD	PF	PA	PD	Pts	Qualification	Bulgaria	Spain	Italy	Croatia	Israel
1	Bulgaria	4	3	1	12	8	+4	26	18	+8	815	716	+99	3	Knockout stage	—	3–2	3–2	2–3	4–1
2	Spain	4	3	1	15	5	+10	22	9	+13	818	688	+130	3			—	4–1	5–0	4–1
3	Italy	4	2	2	11	9	+2	22	23	−1	823	792	+31	2				—	4–1	4–1
4	Croatia	4	2	2	9	11	−2	21	26	−5	816	886	−70	2					—	5–0
5	Israel	4	0	4	3	17	−14	11	26	−15	759	849	−90	0						—

Source: TS

=== Knockout stage ===
Quarter-finals
14 February 2020
Denmark	3
Germany	0
14 February 2020
Russia	3
Bulgaria	1
14 February 2020
Ukraine	0
France	3
14 February 2020
Netherlands	3
England	2

Semi-finals
15 February 2020
Denmark	3
Russia	0
15 February 2020
France	2
Netherlands	3

Final
16 February 2020
Denmark	3
Netherlands	0

== Women's team ==
=== Format ===
In each group, teams played each other once. The seven group winners and the one best runners-up qualified for the knockout stage.

=== Groups ===
==== Group 1 ====
Pos	Team	Pld	W	L	MF	MA	MD	GF	GA	GD	PF	PA	PD	Pts	Qualification	Denmark	Estonia	Netherlands	Ireland
1	Denmark	3	3	0	15	0	+15	30	1	+29	651	400	+251	3	Knockout stage	—	5–0	5–0	5–0
2	Estonia	3	2	1	7	8	−1	14	17	−3	495	586	−91	2			—	3–2	4–1
3	Netherlands	3	1	2	7	8	−1	14	17	−3	575	495	+80	1				—	5–0
4	Ireland	3	0	3	1	14	−13	5	28	−23	444	684	−240	0					—

Source: TS

==== Group 2 ====
Pos	Team	Pld	W	L	MF	MA	MD	GF	GA	GD	PF	PA	PD	Pts	Qualification	Russia	Belgium	Lithuania	Iceland
1	Russia	3	3	0	15	0	+15	30	1	+29	648	362	+286	3	Knockout stage	—	5–0	5–0	5–0
2	Belgium	3	2	1	10	5	+5	20	13	+7	637	559	+78	2			—	5–0	5–0
3	Lithuania	3	1	2	4	11	−7	11	22	−11	490	618	−128	1				—	4–1
4	Iceland	3	0	3	1	14	−13	3	28	−25	412	648	−236	0					—

Source: TS

==== Group 3 ====
Pos	Team	Pld	W	L	MF	MA	MD	GF	GA	GD	PF	PA	PD	Pts	Qualification	France	England	Belarus	Israel
1	France (H)	3	3	0	14	1	+13	28	4	+24	646	411	+235	3	Knockout stage	—	4–1	5–0	5–0
2	England	3	2	1	10	5	+5	21	13	+8	638	543	+95	2			—	5–0	4–1
3	Belarus	3	1	2	3	12	−9	7	24	−17	430	611	−181	1				—	3–2
4	Israel	3	0	3	3	12	−9	10	25	−15	514	663	−149	0					—

Source: TS
(H) Host

==== Group 4 ====
Pos	Team	Pld	W	L	MF	MA	MD	GF	GA	GD	PF	PA	PD	Pts	Qualification	Germany	Slovakia	Latvia	Portugal
1	Germany	3	3	0	15	0	+15	30	0	+30	630	298	+332	3	Knockout stage	—	5–0	5–0	5–0
2	Slovakia	3	2	1	8	7	+1	16	15	+1	530	520	+10	2			—	4–1	4–1
3	Latvia	3	1	2	4	11	−7	11	23	−12	521	665	−144	1				—	3–2
4	Portugal	3	0	3	3	12	−9	7	26	−19	466	664	−198	0					—

Source: TS

==== Group 5 ====
Pos	Team	Pld	W	L	MF	MA	MD	GF	GA	GD	PF	PA	PD	Pts	Qualification	Hungary	Bulgaria	Ukraine	Wales
1	Hungary	3	3	0	11	4	+7	24	11	+13	653	577	+76	3	Knockout stage	—	4–1	3–2	4–1
2	Bulgaria	3	2	1	9	6	+3	21	14	+7	651	559	+92	2			—	3–2	5–0
3	Ukraine	3	1	2	8	7	+1	19	16	+3	667	545	+122	1				—	4–1
4	Wales	3	0	3	2	13	−11	4	27	−23	329	629	−300	0					—

Source: TS

==== Group 6 ====
Pos	Team	Pld	W	L	MF	MA	MD	GF	GA	GD	PF	PA	PD	Pts	Qualification	Turkey	Czech Republic	Slovenia	Finland
1	Turkey	3	3	0	15	0	+15	30	0	+30	632	336	+296	3	Knockout stage	—	5–0	5–0	5–0
2	Czech Republic	3	2	1	9	6	+3	19	12	+7	562	543	+19	2			—	4–1	5–0
3	Slovenia	3	1	2	6	9	−3	12	20	−8	544	604	−60	1				—	5–0
4	Finland	3	0	3	0	15	−15	1	30	−29	392	647	−255	0					—

Source: TS

==== Group 7 ====
Pos	Team	Pld	W	L	MF	MA	MD	GF	GA	GD	PF	PA	PD	Pts	Qualification	Sweden	Scotland	Poland	Spain	Norway
1	Sweden	4	4	0	16	4	+12	33	10	+23	828	620	+208	4	Knockout stage	—	3–2	4–1	4–1	5–0
2	Scotland	4	3	1	16	4	+12	33	8	+25	802	513	+289	3	Knockout stage		—	5–0	4–1	5–0
3	Poland	4	1	3	7	13	−6	16	27	−11	685	801	−116	1				—	4–1	2–3
4	Spain	4	1	3	6	14	−8	13	29	−16	628	794	−166	1					—	3–2
5	Norway	4	1	3	5	15	−10	11	32	−21	631	846	−215	1						—

Source: TS

=== Ranking of second-placed teams ===
Due to group 7 having different number of teams, the results against the fifth-placed teams are not considered for this ranking.

Pos	Grp	Team	Pld	W	L	MF	MA	MD	GF	GA	GD	PF	PA	PD	Pts	Qualification
1	7	Scotland	3	2	1	11	4	+7	23	8	+15	592	412	+180	2	Knockout stage
2	3	England	3	2	1	10	5	+5	21	13	+8	638	543	+95	2	
3	5	Bulgaria	3	2	1	9	6	+3	21	14	+7	651	559	+92	2	
4	6	Czech Republic	3	2	1	9	6	+3	19	12	+7	562	543	+19	2	
5	2	Belgium	3	2	1	9	6	+3	20	14	+6	637	537	+100	2	
6	4	Slovakia	3	2	1	8	7	+1	16	15	+1	530	520	+10	2	
7	1	Estonia	3	2	1	7	8	−1	14	17	−3	495	586	−91	2	

=== Knockout stage ===
Quarter-finals
14 February 2020
Denmark	3
Turkey	0
14 February 2020
France	3
Sweden	1
14 February 2020
Hungary	0
Germany	3
14 February 2020
Scotland	3
Russia	0

Semi-finals
15 February 2020
Denmark	3
France	1
15 February 2020
Germany	3
Scotland	1

Final
16 February 2020
Denmark	3
Germany	1
