= Belgian Badminton Federation =

Governing body of badminton in Belgium

Royal Belgian Badminton Federation
- Formation: 1949
- Headquarters: Braine-l'Alleud
- President: Bert Vanhorenbeeck & Charlotte Coesens
- General Secretary: Aurore Lequatre
- Affiliations: BEC, BWF
- Website: www.belgian-badminton.be

The Royal Belgian Badminton Federation (RBBF) is the governing body for Badminton in Belgium. The administrative seat is located in Braine-l'Alleud. The federation was one of the eleven founding members of Badminton Europe in 1967. It oversees both regional organizations in the country: Badminton Vlaanderen and Ligue Francophone Belge de Badminton.

== Tournaments ==
- Yonex Belgian International, annual open tournament held since 1958
- Yonex Belgian Junior International
- Belgian National Badminton Championships
- Belgian National Junior Badminton Championships
- Belgian National Senior Badminton Championships
- Belgian National Para Badminton Championships
- Belgian National Badminton Interclub League

== Ranking of players ==
Competition badminton players in Belgium are ranked individually in each discipline according to a number system. This system is organized as follows (starting with lowest): 12 to 1.
