= Latvia national badminton team =

National badminton team representing Latvia

Latvia
- Association: Latvijas Badmintona Federācija (LBF)
- Confederation: BE (Europe)
- President: Viestus Bajārs

BWF ranking
- Current ranking: 96 ▼2 (2 January 2024)
- Highest ranking: 63 (3 April 2015)

Sudirman Cup
- Appearances: 3 (first in 1999)
- Best result: Group stage

European Mixed Team Championships
- Appearances: 3 (first in 2009)
- Best result: Group stage

European Men's Team Championships
- Appearances: 2 (first in 2018)
- Best result: Group stage

European Women's Team Championships
- Appearances: 4 (first in 2010)
- Best result: Group stage

Helvetia Cup
- Appearances: 1 (first in 2001)
- Best result: 16th (2001)

The Latvia national badminton team (Latvian: Latvijas badmintona izlase) represents Latvia in international badminton team competitions. Like many post-Soviet states, the Latvian national team was formed after the dissolution of the Soviet Union. The national team is controlled by the Latvian Badminton Federation.

The national team competed in the Sudirman Cup until 2007. The men's and women's team compete in the European Men's and Women's Team Badminton Championships.

== Competitive record ==
=== Thomas Cup ===
Year	Round	Pos
1949	Part of the Soviet Union	
1952	Part of the Soviet Union	
1955	Part of the Soviet Union	
1958	Part of the Soviet Union	
1961	Part of the Soviet Union	
1964	Part of the Soviet Union	
1967	Part of the Soviet Union	
1970	Part of the Soviet Union	
1973	Part of the Soviet Union	
1976	Part of the Soviet Union	
1979	Part of the Soviet Union	
1982	Part of the Soviet Union	
1984	Part of the Soviet Union	
1986	Part of the Soviet Union	
1988	Part of the Soviet Union	
1990	Part of the Soviet Union	
1992	Did not enter	
1994	Did not enter	
1996	Did not enter	
1998
2000
2002	Did not qualify	
2004	Did not qualify	

Sudirman Cup

Year	Result
(Indonesia) 1989 (Denmark) 1991	Part of Soviet Union
(Denmark) 1999	49th - Group 7
(Netherlands) 2003	45th - Group 6
(Scotland) 2007	48th - Group 6

== Participation in European Team Badminton Championships ==
Men's Team

Year	Result
(Russia) 2018	Group stage
(France) 2020	Group stage

Women's Team

Year	Result
(Poland) 2010	Group stage
(Switzerland) 2014	Group stage
(Russia) 2018	Group stage
(France) 2020	Group stage

Mixed Team

Year	Result
(England) 2009	Group stage
(Netherlands) 2011	Group stage
(Russia) 2013	Group stage

== Participation in Helvetia Cup ==
The Helvetia Cup or European B Team Championships was a European mixed team championship in badminton. The first Helvetia Cup tournament took place in Zürich, Switzerland in 1962. The tournament took place every two years from 1971 until 2007, after which it was dissolved. Latvia competed under the Soviet flag in 1977 and 1979. The national team only competed once after the dissolution of the USSR.

Year	Result
(Soviet Union) 1977	Part of the Soviet Union
(Austria) 1979	Part of the Soviet Union
(Czech Republic) 2001	16th place

=== Junior competitive record ===
==== Suhandinata Cup ====
Year	Result
(Spain) 2016	Group D2 - 39th of 52
(Indonesia) 2017	Group E - 32nd of 44
(Canada) 2018	Did not enter
(Russia) 2019	Group C1 - 39th of 43
(New Zealand) 2020	Cancelled
(China) 2021	Cancelled
(Spain) 2022	Group D - 31st of 37
(United States) 2023	Group C - 35th of 38
(China) 2024	Group G - 31st of 39

==== European Junior Team Badminton Championships ====
Mixed Team

Year	Result
(Finland) 2011	Group stage
(Turkey) 2013	Group stage
(Poland) 2015	Group stage
(France) 2017	Group stage
(Estonia) 2018	Group stage
(Serbia) 2022	Group stage
(Spain) 2024	Group stage

== Players ==
=== Current squad ===
As of 2 January 2024

==== Men's team ====
Name	DoB/Age	Ranking of event		
Name	DoB/Age	MS	MD	XD
Artūrs Akmens	9 May 1992 (age 34)	1668	1301	1359
Reinis Krauklis	4 September 1995 (age 30)	1418	1301	1160
Rihards Žugs	26 January 2005 (age 21)	1803	1293	1402
Edžus Meirans	27 April 2005 (age 21)	1732	1293	1402
Davis Strazdins	29 November 2005 (age 20)	1803	1301	1402
Toms Sala	7 October 2007 (age 18)	1803	1301	1402

==== Women's team ====
Name	DoB/Age	Ranking of event		
Name	DoB/Age	WS	WD	XD
Ieva Pope	8 January 1994 (age 32)	1024	-	-
Jekaterina Romanova	12 November 1997 (age 28)	408	125	-
Anna Kupča	19 October 2005 (age 20)	452	125	1402
Annija Rulle-Titava	27 April 2004 (age 22)	-	-	1359
Diāna Stognija	11 March 2001 (age 25)	-	-	1160
Eiprila Briede	7 June 2005 (age 21)	-	-	1402
