= Hungary national badminton team =

National badminton team representing Hungary

Hungary
- Association: Magyar Tollaslabda Szövetség (MTLSZ)
- Confederation: BE (Europe)
- President: Rázsó Pál

BWF ranking
- Current ranking: 45 ▲2 (2 January 2024)
- Highest ranking: 32 (2 January 2019)

Sudirman Cup
- Appearances: 3 (first in 1993)
- Best result: Group stage

European Mixed Team Championships
- Appearances: 10 (first in 1980)
- Best result: Group stage

European Men's Team Championships
- Appearances: 5 (first in 2008)
- Best result: Group stage

European Women's Team Championships
- Appearances: 5 (first in 2008)
- Best result: Quarter-finals (2020)

Helvetia Cup
- Appearances: 12 (first in 1973)
- Best result: 6th (1973)

The Hungary national badminton team (Hungarian: Magyar tollaslabda válogatott) represents Hungary in international badminton team competitions. It is controlled by the Hungarian Badminton Association (Hungarian: Magyar Tollaslabda Szövetség). The Hungarian team have only participated in the Sudirman Cup three times.

The women's team reached the quarterfinals of the 2020 European Women's Team Badminton Championships. The mixed team have also competed in the Helvetia Cup.

== Competitive record ==
=== Thomas Cup ===
Year	Round	Pos
1949	Did not enter	
1952	Did not enter	
1955	Did not enter	
1958	Did not enter	
1961	Did not enter	
1964	Did not enter	
1967	Did not enter	
1970	Did not enter	
1973	Did not enter	
1976	Did not enter	
1979	Did not enter	
1982	Did not enter	
1984	Did not enter	
1986	Did not enter	
1988	Did not enter	
1990	Did not qualify	
1992	Did not qualify	
1994	Did not enter	
1996	Did not qualify	
1998
2000
2002	Did not qualify	
2004	Did not qualify	

Sudirman Cup

Year	Result
1993	33rd - Group 8
1995	34th - Group 8 Relegated
2003	39th - Group 6

== Participation in European Team Badminton Championships ==
Men's Team

Year	Result
(Netherlands) 2008	Group stage
(Poland) 2010	Group stage
(Russia) 2016	Group stage
(Russia) 2018	Group stage
(France) 2020	Group stage
(Poland) 2024	Did not qualify
(Turkey) 2026	Did not qualify

Women's Team

Year	Result
(Poland) 2010	Group stage
(Switzerland) 2014	Group stage
(Russia) 2016	Group stage
(Russia) 2018	Group stage
(France) 2020	Quarter-finalist
(Poland) 2024	Did not qualify
(Turkey) 2026	Did not qualify

Mixed Team

Year	Result
(Netherlands) 1980	Group stage
(West Germany) 1982	Group stage
(England) 1984	Group stage
(Sweden) 1986	Group stage
(Norway) 1988	Group stage
(Soviet Union) 1990	Group stage
(Scotland) 1992	Group stage
(England) 2009	Group stage
(Netherlands) 2011	Group stage
(Russia) 2013	Group stage
(Azerbaijan) 2025	Did not qualify

== Participation in Helvetia Cup ==
The Helvetia Cup or European B Team Championships was a European mixed team championship in badminton. The first Helvetia Cup tournament took place in Zürich, Switzerland in 1962. The tournament took place every two years from 1971 until 2007, after which it was dissolved. Hungary hosted the 1989 Helvetia Cup.

Year	Result
(Austria) 1973	6th place
(Soviet Union) 1977	10th place
(Austria) 1979	7th place
(Switzerland) 1983	10th place
(Poland) 1985	12th place
(Hungary) 1989	8th place
(Austria) 1993	15th place
(Cyprus) 1995	8th place
(France) 1997	8th place
(Czech Republic) 2001	17th place

Year	Result
(Portugal) 2003	9th place
(Cyprus) 2005	14th place

== Junior competitive record ==
=== Suhandinata Cup ===
==== Mixed team ====
Year	Round	Pos
(China) 2000	Did not enter	
(South Africa) 2002	Did not enter	
(Canada) 2004	Did not enter	
(South Korea) 2006	Did not enter	
(New Zealand) 2007	Did not enter	
(India) 2008	Did not enter	
(Malaysia) 2009	Did not enter	
(Mexico) 2010	Did not enter	
(Taiwan) 2011	Did not enter	
(Japan) 2012	Did not enter	
(Thailand) 2013	Did not enter	
(Malaysia) 2014	Did not enter	
(Peru) 2015	Group stage	25th of 39
(Spain) 2016	Group stage	37th of 52
(Indonesia) 2017	Group stage	27th of 44
(Canada) 2018	Did not enter	
(Russia) 2019	Group stage	24th of 43
(New Zealand) 2020	Cancelled because of COVID-19 pandemic	
(China) 2021	Cancelled because of COVID-19 pandemic	
(Spain) 2022	Group stage	24th of 37
(United States) 2023	Did not enter	
(China) 2024	Did not enter	
(India) 2025	Group stage	25th of 36
(Egypt) 2026	Group stage	30th of 47

=== European Junior Team Championships ===
==== Mixed team ====
Year	Result
(Italy) 2009	Group stage
(Finland) 2011	Group stage
(Turkey) 2013	Group stage
(Poland) 2015	Group stage
(France) 2017	Group stage
(Estonia) 2018	Group stage
(Serbia) 2022	Group stage
(Spain) 2024	Group stage

== Players ==
=== Current squad ===
As of 2 January 2024

==== Men's team ====
Name	DoB/Age	Ranking of event		
Name	DoB/Age	MS	MD	XD
Gergő Pytel	11 March 1999 (age 27)	143	-	339
Zsombor Agai	10 November 2004 (age 21)	-	219	-
Miklós Kis-Kasza	14 February 2004 (age 22)	1803	219	611
Zoltán Szele	7 November 1998 (age 27)	-	422	1313
Marcell Csobod	11 May 2001 (age 25)	-	422	1425
Kristóf Tóth	4 February 2004 (age 22)	893	-	614

==== Women's team ====
Name	DoB/Age	Ranking of event		
Name	DoB/Age	WS	WD	XD
Vivien Sándorházi	3 January 2001 (age 25)	77	502	1393
Ágnes Kőrösi	22 September 1995 (age 31)	105	492	319
Daniella Gonda	1 January 1994 (age 32)	150	492	611
Tünde Takács	10 May 2005 (age 21)	1030	-	-
Nikol Szabina Vetor	26 November 2004 (age 21)	-	502	711
Petra Mészáros	8 December 2003 (age 22)	-	871	-
