= 2011–12 European Badminton Circuit season =

The 2011–12 European Badminton Circuit season started in May 2011 and ended in April 2012.

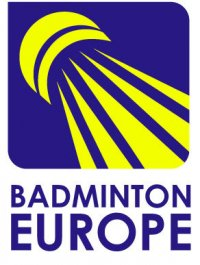
Badminton Europe - circuit governing body

== Results ==
=== Winners ===
Circuit	Men's singles	Women's singles	Men's doubles	Women's doubles	Mixed doubles
Denmark International	(Denmark) Jan O Jorgensen	(Russia) Anastasia Prokopenko	(Denmark) Rasmus Bonde (Denmark) Anders Kristiansen	(Denmark) Line Damkjær Kruse (Denmark) Marie Røpke	(Denmark) Mads Pieler Kolding (Denmark) Julie Houmann
Slovenian International	(Chinese Taipei) Hsu Jen-hao	(Germany) Carola Bott	(Poland) Lukasz Moren (Poland) Wojciech Szkudlarczyk	(Germany) Johanna Goliszewski (Germany) Carla Nelte	(Croatia) Zvonimir Durkinjak (Croatia) Stasa Poznanovic
Spanish International	(Denmark) Viktor Axelsen	(Spain) Carolina Marin	(Poland) Adam Cwalina (Poland) Michal Logosz	(Netherlands) Lotte Jonathans (Netherlands) Paulien van Dooremalen	(Denmark) Mikkel Delbo Larsen (Denmark) Mie Schjott-Kristensen
Lithuanian International	(Lithuania) Kęstutis Navickas	(Republic of Ireland) Chloe Magee	(Poland) Lukasz Moren (Poland) Wojciech Szkudlarczyk	(Ukraine) Ganna Kobtseva (Ukraine) Elena Prus	(Republic of Ireland) Sam Magee (Republic of Ireland) Chloe Magee
St. Petersburg White Nights	(Chinese Taipei) Hsu Jen-hao	(Indonesia) Fransisca Ratnasari	(Indonesia) Rendra Wijaya (Indonesia) Rian Sukmawan	(Russia) Anastasia Russkikh (Russia) Irina Hlebko	(Singapore) Danny Bawa Chrisnanta (Singapore) Vanessa Neo Yu Yan
Slovak International	(Czech Republic) Petr Koukal	(Finland) Anu Nieminen	(Netherlands) Jorrit de Ruiter (Netherlands) Dave Khodabux	(Netherlands) Selena Piek (Netherlands) Iris Tabeling	(Netherlands) Dave Khodabux (Netherlands) Selena Piek
Kharkiv International	(France) Brice Leverdez	(Germany) Olga Konon	(Russia) Vladimir Ivanov (Russia) Ivan Sozonov	(Singapore) Shinta Mulia Sari (Singapore) Yao Lei	(Germany) Michael Fuchs (Germany) Birgit Michels
Belgian International	(France) Brice Leverdez	(Germany) Olga Konon	(Poland) Adam Cwalina (Poland) Michal Logosz	(Singapore) Shinta Mulia Sari (Singapore) Yao Lei	(Singapore) Chayut Triyachart (Singapore) Yao Lei
Czech International	(Poland) Przemyslaw Wacha	(Czech Republic) Kristina Gavnholt	(Poland) Adam Cwalina (Poland) Michal Logosz	(Russia) Valeria Sorokina (Russia) Nina Vislova	(Russia) Alexandr Nikolaenko (Russia) Nina Vislova
Bulgarian International	(Poland) Przemyslaw Wacha	(Bulgaria) Linda Zechiri	(Chinese Taipei) Liang Jui-wei (Chinese Taipei) Liao Kuan-hao	(England) Heather Olver (England) Mariana Agathangelou	(Ukraine) Valeriy Atrashchenkov (Ukraine) Anna Kobceva
Turkey Open	(Germany) Fabian Hammes	(Greece) Anne Hald Jensen	(England) Ben Stawski (England) Paul van Rietvelde	(Bulgaria) Gabriela Stoeva (Bulgaria) Stefani Stoeva	(England) Ben Stawski (England) Lauren Smith
Swiss International	(Indonesia) Andre Kurniawan Tedjono	(India) P. V. Sindhu	(Poland) Lukasz Moren (Poland) Wojciech Szkudlarczyk	(India) Pradnya Gadre (India) Prajakta Sawant	(Russia) Vitalij Durkin (Russia) Nina Vislova
Cyprus International	(Denmark) Emil Holst	(Belgium) Lianne Tan	(Denmark) Theis Christiansen (Denmark) Niclas Nohr	(Russia) Tatjana Bibik (Russia) Anastasia Chervaykova	(Denmark) Niclas Nohr (Denmark) Joan Christiansen
Hungarian International	(Denmark) Rasmus Fladberg	(Bulgaria) Stefani Stoeva	(Croatia) Zvonimir Durkinjak (Croatia) Zvonimir Hoelbling	(Poland) Natalia Pocztowiak (Croatia) Stasa Poznanovic	(Indonesia) Viki Indra Okvana (Indonesia) Gustiani Megawati
Iceland International	(Sweden) Mathias Borg	(Iceland) Ragna Ingólfsdóttir	(Denmark) Thomas Dew-Hattens (Denmark) Mathias Kany	(Iceland) Tinna Helgadóttir (Iceland) Snjólaug Jóhannsdóttir	(Denmark) Thomas Dew-Hattens (Denmark) Louise Hansen
Norwegian International	(Finland) Ville Lang	(Bulgaria) Linda Zechiri	(Denmark) Rasmus Bonde (Denmark) Anders Kristiansen	(United States) Eva Lee (United States) Paula Lynn Obanana	(Republic of Ireland) Sam Magee (Republic of Ireland) Chloe Magee
Scottish Open	(England) Rajiv Ouseph	(Netherlands) Judith Meulendijks	(Russia) Vladimir Ivanov (Russia) Ivan Sozonov	(Sweden) Emelie Lennartsson (Sweden) Emma Wengberg	(Denmark) Kim Astrup Sorensen (Denmark) Line Kjaersfeldt
Welsh International	(Sri Lanka) Niluka Karunaratne	(Switzerland) Nicole Schaller	(England) Chris Coles (England) Matthew Nottingham	(Malaysia) Ng Hui Ern (Malaysia) Ng Hui Lin	(Scotland) Martin Campbell (Malaysia) Ng Hui Lin
Irish Open	(England) Rajiv Ouseph	(Chinese Taipei) Pai Hsiao-Ma	(Poland) Adam Cwalina (Poland) Michel Logosz	(Malaysia) Ng Hui Ern (Malaysia) Ng Hui Lin	(England) Heather Olver (England) Marcus Ellis
Italian International	(Spain) Pablo Abian	(Netherlands) Yao Jie	(Russia) Vladimir Ivanov (Russia) Ivan Sozonov	(Russia) Valeria Sorokina (Russia) Nina Vislova	(Russia) Alexandr Nikolaenko (Russia) Valeria Sorokina
Turkey International	(South Korea) Hong Ji-hoon	(Bulgaria) Petya Nedelcheva	(South Korea) Kim Ki-jung (South Korea) Kim Sa-rang	(Germany) Sandra Marinello (Germany) Birgit Michels	(South Korea) Cho Gun-woo (South Korea) Yoo Hyun-young
Estonian International	(Finland) Ville Lång	(Netherlands) Judith Meulendijks	(France) Laurent Constantin (France) Sebastien Vincent	(Netherlands) Selena Piek (Netherlands) Iris Tabeling	(Netherlands) Dave Khodabux (Netherlands) Selena Piek
Swedish International	(Hong Kong) Chan Yan Kit	(France) Pi Hongyan	(Russia) Vladimir Ivanov (Russia) Ivan Sozonov	(England) Mariana Agathangelou (England) Heather Olver	(England) Nathan Robertson (England) Jenny Wallwork
Austrian International	(Poland) Przemysław Wacha	(Japan) Sayaka Takahashi	(India) Rupesh Kumar K. T. (India) Sanave Thomas	(Malaysia) Ng Hui Ern (Malaysia) Ng Hui Lin	(Hong Kong) Wong Wai Hong (Hong Kong) Chau Hoi Wah
Croatian International	(Germany) Lukas Schmidt	(Japan) Kana Ito	(Netherlands) Jacco Arends (Netherlands) Jelle Maas	(Netherlands) Samantha Barning (Netherlands) Eefje Muskens	(Netherlands) Jacco Arends (Netherlands) Ilse Vaessen
Romanian International	(Germany) Marcel Reuter	(Japan) Kana Ito	(France) Laurent Constantin (France) Sebastien Vincent	(Denmark) Sandra-Maria Jensen (Denmark) Line Kjaersfeldt	(Indonesia) Edi Subaktiar (Indonesia) Melati Daeva Oktaviani
Polish Open	(Chinese Taipei) Hsu Jen-hao	(Japan) Ai Goto	(Russia) Vladimir Ivanov (Russia) Ivan Sozonov	(England) Mariana Agathangelou (England) Heather Olver	(England) Nathan Robertson (England) Jenny Wallwork
Finnish International	(England) Rajiv Ouseph	(Netherlands) Yao Jie	(Russia) Vladimir Ivanov (Russia) Ivan Sozonov	(Canada) Alex Bruce (Canada) Michelle Li	(England) Chris Adcock (Scotland) Imogen Bankier
French International	(India) Anand Pawar	(Netherlands) Judith Meulendijks	(Germany) Peter Käsbauer (Germany) Josche Zurwonne	(Germany) Johanna Goliszewski (Netherlands) Judith Meulendijks	(Germany) Peter Käsbauer (Germany) Johanna Goliszewski
Dutch International	(Indonesia) Andre Kurniawan Tedjono	(Netherlands) Yao Jie	(Malaysia) Nelson Heg Wei Keat (Malaysia) Teo Ee Yi	(Netherlands) Lotte Jonathans (Netherlands) Paulien van Dooremalen	(Poland) Robert Mateusiak (Poland) Nadieżda Zięba
Portugal International	(Germany) Dieter Domke	(Spain) Beatriz Corrales	(Croatia) Zvonimir Durkinjak (Denmark) Nikolaj Overgaard	(England) Gabrielle White (England) Alexandra Langley	(England) Marcus Ellis (England) Gabrielle White

=== Performance by countries ===
Tabulated below are the Circuit performances based on countries. Only countries who have won a title are listed:

No.	Team	DEN	SLO	ESP	LTU	RUS	SVK	UKR	BEL	CZE	BUL	TKO	SUI	CYP	HUN	ISL	NOR	SCO	WLS	IRL	ITA	TUR	EST	SWE	AUT	CRO	ROM	POL	FIN	FRA	NLD	POR	Total
1	Netherlands			1			3											1			1		3			3			1	2	2		17
2	Denmark	4		2										3	1	2	1	1									1					1	16
3	England										1	2						1	1	2				2				2	2			2	15
4	Russia	1				1		1		2			1	1				1			3			1				1	1				14
5	Germany		2					2	1			1										1				1	1			3		1	13
6	Poland		1	1	1				1	2	1		1		1					1					1						1		12
7	Indonesia					2							1		1												1				1		7
8	Bulgaria										1	1			1		1					1											5
8	Chinese Taipei		1			1					1									1								1					5
8	France							1	1														1	1			1						5
8	Malaysia																		2	1					1						1		5
12	Croatia		1												2																	1	4
12	India												2												1					1			4
12	Japan																								1	1	1	1					4
12	Singapore					1		1	2																								4
16	Finland						1										1						1										3
16	Ireland				2												1																3
16	South Korea																					3											3
16	Spain			1																	1											1	3
20	Czech Republic						1			1																							2
20	Hong Kong																							1	1								2
20	Iceland															2																	2
20	Scotland																		1										1				2
20	Sweden															1		1															2
20	Ukraine				1						1																						2
26	Belgium													1																			1
26	Canada																												1				1
26	Greece											1																					1
26	Lithuania				1																												1
26	Sri Lanka																		1														1
26	Switzerland																		1														1
26	United States																1																1
