= 2010 French Super Series =

The 2010 French Open Super Series was a top-level badminton competition held from 2 to 7 November 2010 in Paris, France. It was the tenth tournament on the 2010 BWF Super Series calendar. The total purse for the event was $200,000.

== Men's singles ==
1. (Denmark) Peter Gade
2. (Indonesia) Taufik Hidayat
3. (Thailand) Boonsak Ponsana
4. (Denmark) Jan Ø. Jørgensen
5. (Germany) Marc Zwiebler
6. (England) Rajiv Ouseph
7. (Netherlands) Dicky Palyama
8. (Denmark) Joachim Persson

=== Top half ===
First Round
1	(Denmark) P Gade	21	21
(England) C Baxter	11	6
(France) M L Y Ping	16	13
(Denmark) C Lind Thomsen	21	21
5	(Germany) M Zwiebler	21	15	27
Q4	(Spain) I Bagus	7	21	25
(Sweden) H Hurskainen	21	21
(France) S Maunoury	13	15
4	(Denmark) J Ø. Jørgensen	21	13	21
(Poland) P Wacha	18	21	13
Q1	(Denmark) V Axelsen	11	11
(China) Du PY	21	21
8	(Denmark) J Persson	13	21	21
(Netherlands) E Pang	21	15	16
(Estonia) R Must	19	16
(Denmark) H-K Vittinghus	21	21

Second Round
1	(Denmark) P Gade	21	21
(Denmark) C Lind Thomsen	14	8
5	(Germany) M Zwiebler	21	21
(Sweden) H Hurskainen	11	12
4	(Denmark) J Ø. Jørgensen	7	21	12
(China) Du PY	21	14	21
8	(Denmark) J Persson	23	24
(Denmark) H-K Vittinghus	21	22

Quarterfinals
1	(Denmark) P Gade	15	21	21
5	(Germany) M Zwiebler	21	12	8
(China) Du PY	17	21	19
8	(Denmark) J Persson	21	12	21

Semifinals
1	(Denmark) P Gade	14	21	17
8	(Denmark) J Persson	21	16	21

=== Bottom half ===
First Round
(Denmark) R Ulsing	10	21	16
(India) A Jayaram	21	16	21
(Czech Republic) P Koukal	15	17
7	(Netherlands) D Palyama	21	21
(Lithuania) K Navickas	21	20	21
(Ukraine) V Atrashchenkov	18	22	8
Q2	(Ukraine) V Ponov	13	11
3	(Thailand) B Ponsana	21	21
(Republic of Ireland) S Evans	18	21	21
(France) B Leverdez	21	16	14
(Denmark) K Ipsen	14	10
6	(England) R Ouseph	21	21
(Ukraine) D Zavadsky	13	21	19
PFQ	(Germany) M Reuter	21	19	21
Q3	(China) Wang ZM	18	12
2	(Indonesia) T Hidayat	21	21

Second Round
(India) A Jayaram	21	14	21
7	(Netherlands) D Palyama	19	21	15
(Lithuania) K Navickas	7	9
3	(Thailand) B Ponsana	21	21
(Republic of Ireland) S Evans	13	11
6	(England) R Ouseph	21	21
PFQ	(Germany) M Reuter	16	14
2	(Indonesia) T Hidayat	21	21

Quarterfinals
(India) A Jayaram	15	14
3	(Thailand) B Ponsana	21	21
6	(England) R Ouseph	13	18
2	(Indonesia) T Hidayat	21	21

Semifinals
3	(Thailand) B Ponsana	13	14
2	(Indonesia) T Hidayat	21	21

=== Final ===
Final
8	(Denmark) Joachim Persson	16	11
2	(Indonesia) Taufik Hidayat	21	21

== Women's singles ==
1. (China) Wang Yihan
2. (Denmark) Tine Baun
3. (France) Pi Hongyan
4. (Netherlands) Yao Jie
5. (Germany) Juliane Schenk
6. (Russia) Ella Diehl
7. (Bulgaria) Petya Nedelcheva
8. (China) Li Xuerui

=== Top half ===
First Round
1	(China) Wang YH	21	21
Q4	(France) M Maunoury	11	7
Q1	(Switzerland) S Jaquet	14	21	21
Q3	(Poland) M Kurdelska	21	17	10
6	(Russia) E Diehl	21	21
(Ukraine) M Diptan	9	13
(Ukraine) L Griga	21	21
(France) B Matias	8	4
3	(France) Pi HY	21	12	21
(Chinese Taipei) Tai T-y	16	21	13
(Bulgaria) L Zechiri	11	21	15
(England) E Cann	21	17	21
7	(Bulgaria) P Nedelcheva	21	22
(Iceland) R Ingolfsdottir	15	20
(France) P Le Buhanic	11	16
(Thailand) P Buranaprasertsuk	21	21

Second Round
1	(China) Wang YH	21	21
Q1	(Switzerland) S Jaquet	11	8
6	(Russia) E Diehl	21	19	21
(Ukraine) L Griga	11	21	14
3	(France) Pi HY	13	12
(England) E Cann	21	21
7	(Bulgaria) P Nedelcheva	15	16
(Thailand) P Buranaprasertsuk	21	21

Quarterfinals
1	(China) Wang YH	21	21
6	(Russia) E Diehl	8	8
(England) E Cann	15	18
(Thailand) P Buranaprasertsuk	21	21

Semifinals
1	(China) Wang YH	21	19	21
(Thailand) P Buranaprasertsuk	12	21	10

=== Bottom half ===
First Round
(Belgium) L Tan	16	18
(China) Liu X	21	21
(Austria) S Prutsch	12	8
5	(Germany) J Schenk	21	21
(Thailand) S Ponsana	21	21
(Scotland) S Egelstaff	15	17
(New Zealand) M C Ky	5	17
4	(Netherlands) Yao J	21	21
(Germany) O Konon	21	21
(France) S Vignes	12	19
Q2	(France) L Palermo	13	4
8	(China) Li XR	21	21
(China) Zhu L	17	21	17
(Switzerland) J Cicognini	21	13	21
(Ukraine) E Prus	10	10
2	(Denmark) T Baun	21	21

Second Round
(China) Liu X	21	21
5	(Germany) J Schenk	16	17
(Thailand) S Ponsana	21	21
4	(Netherlands) Yao J	8	19
(Germany) O Konon	18	21	18
8	(China) Li XR	21	19	21
(Switzerland) J Cicognini	16	11
2	(Denmark) T Baun	21	21

Quarterfinals
(China) Liu X	9	21	17
(Thailand) S Ponsana	21	19	21
8	(China) Li XR	21	21
2	(Denmark) T Baun	16	17

Semifinals
(Thailand) S Ponsana	20	13
8	(China) Li XR	22	21

=== Final ===
Final
1	(China) Wang Yihan	21	21
8	(China) Li Xuerui	13	9

== Men's doubles ==
1. (Denmark) Carsten Mogensen / Mathias Boe
2. (Indonesia) Hendra Setiawan / Markis Kido
3. (Indonesia) Alvent Yulianto Chandra / Hendra Aprida Gunawan
4. (England) Anthony Clark / Nathan Robertson (withdrew)
5. (Denmark) Jonas Rasmussen / Mads Conrad-Petersen
6. (Malaysia) Tan Bin Shen / Gan Teik Chai
7. (Thailand) Songphon Anugritayawon / Sudket Prapakamol
8. (England) Chris Langridge / Robin Middleton

=== Top half ===
First Round
1	(Denmark) M Boe (Denmark) C Mogensen	21	21
(France) B Careme (France) S Grosjean	16	15
PFQ	(France) M Baumann (France) G Mittelheisser	13	14
(Malaysia) Goh W S (Malaysia) Teo K S	21	21
8	(England) C Langridge (England) R Middleton	21	21
Q3	(France) M Delille (France) J Gaudy	12	15
(France) L Constantin (France) S Vincent	13	12
(Indonesia) F Limpele (Denmark) S Mollyhus	21	21
3	(Indonesia) A Y Chandra (Indonesia) H A Gunawan	25	19
(England) C Adcock (England) A Ellis	27	21
(United States) H H Ho (United States) P Chew	12	17
(Germany) M Fuchs (Germany) O Roth	21	21
5	(Denmark) M Conrad-Petersen (Denmark) J Rasmussen	21	13	21
(Malaysia) M Z A Latif (Malaysia) Hoon T H	16	21	14
(Denmark) K Faust Henriksen (Denmark) M Pieler Kolding	1
(Czech Republic) O Kopriva (Czech Republic) T Kopriva	2^{r}

Second Round
1	(Denmark) M Boe (Denmark) C Mogensen	15	21	21
(Malaysia) Goh W S (Malaysia) Teo K S	21	14	16
8	(England) C Langridge (England) R Middleton	17	11
(Indonesia) F Limpele (Denmark) S Mollyhus	21	21
(England) C Adcock (England) A Ellis	21	19	22
(Germany) M Fuchs (Germany) O Roth	19	21	20
5	(Denmark) M Conrad-Petersen (Denmark) J Rasmussen	21	21	21
(Denmark) K Faust Henriksen (Denmark) M Pieler Kolding	15	23	13

Quarterfinals
1	(Denmark) M Boe (Denmark) C Mogensen	21	21
(Indonesia) F Limpele (Denmark) S Mollyhus	16	18
(England) C Adcock (England) A Ellis	25	20	14
5	(Denmark) M Conrad-Petersen (Denmark) Jonas Rasmussen	23	22	21

Semifinals
1	(Denmark) M Boe (Denmark) C Mogensen	21	21	21
5	(Denmark) M Conrad-Petersen (Denmark) J Rasmussen	23	6	16

=== Bottom half ===
First Round
Q2	(France) V Espen (France) D Nourry	7	10
(Germany) I Kindervater (Germany) J Schöttler	21	21
(France) R Labar (France) M Quere	11	20
7	(Thailand) S Anugritayawon (Thailand) S Prapakamol	21	20
(France) C Bruno (France) G Louis	6	6
(Malaysia) M F M Tazari (Malaysia) Ong S H	21	21
(Poland) L Moren (Poland) W Szkudlarczyk	21	20	21
PFQ	(France) L Corvee (France) J Grosjean	10	22	16
(Ukraine) D Zavadsky (Ukraine) V Konov	18	18
Q2	(France) M Renault (France) S Ternon	21	21
(Poland) A Cwalina (Poland) M Łogosz	18	18
6	(Malaysia) Tan B S (Malaysia) Gan T C	21	21
(Netherlands) R Bosch (Netherlands) K Ridder	19	16
2	(Indonesia) M Kido (Indonesia) H Setiawan	21	21

Second Round
(Germany) I Kindervater (Germany) J Schöttler	21	21
7	(Thailand) S Anugritayawon (Thailand) S Prapakamol	17	17
(Malaysia) M F M Tazari (Malaysia) Ong S H	21	15	21
(Poland) L Moren (Poland) W Szkudlarczyk	14	21	11
Q2	(France) M Renault (France) S Ternon	14	14
6	(Malaysia) Tan B S (Malaysia) Gan T C	21	21
(Croatia) Z Hoelbling (Croatia) Z Đurkinjak	17	21	13
2	(Indonesia) M Kido (Indonesia) H Setiawan	21	14	21

Quarterfinals
(Germany) I Kindervater (Germany) J Schöttler	22	21
(Malaysia) M F M Tazari (Malaysia) Ong S H	20	18
6	(Malaysia) Tan B S (Malaysia) Gan T C	21	18	17
2	(Indonesia) M Kido (Indonesia) H Setiawan	14	21	21

Semifinals
(Germany) I Kindervater (Germany) J Schöttler	13	21	22
2	(Indonesia) M Kido (Indonesia) H Setiawan	21	17	20

=== Final ===
Final
1	(Denmark) Mathias Boe (Denmark) Carsten Mogensen	21	21
	(Germany) Ingo Kindervater (Germany) Johannes Schöttler	15	9

== Women's doubles ==
1. (Russia) / (Bulgaria) Anastasia Russkikh / Petya Nedelcheva
2. (Russia) Nina Vislova / Valeria Sorokina
3. (Thailand) Duanganong Aroonkesorn / Kunchala Voravichitchaikul
4. (Netherlands) Lotte Jonathans / Paulien van Dooremalen
5. (Germany) Birgit Overzier / Sandra Marinello
6. (France) Laura Choinet / Weny Rasidi
7. (England) Gabrielle White / Jenny Wallwork
8. (Sweden) Emelie Lennartsson / Emma Wengberg

=== Top half ===
First Round
(Indonesia) N Melati (Indonesia) V Marissa	19	18
(Denmark) L Damkjær Kruse (Denmark) M Schjøtt-Kristensen	21	21
(England) M Agathangelou (England) H Olver	21	21
(France) A Chaillou (France) S Saiche	14	13
(Denmark) C Pedersen (Denmark) K Rytter Juhl	21	21
(Finland) A Nieminen (New Zealand) M C Ky	19	9

Second Round
1	(Russia) A Russkikh (Bulgaria) P Nedelcheva	21	21
(France) A Fontaine (France) L Palermo	13	16
8	(Sweden) E Lennartsson (Sweden) E Wengberg	24	21	17
(Denmark) L Damkjær Kruse (Denmark) M Schjøtt-Kristensen	26	17	21
4	(Netherlands) L Jonathans (Netherlands) P van Dooremalen	17	21	18
(England) M Agathangelou (England) H Olver	21	16	21
5	(Germany) B Overzier (Germany) S Marinello	12	14
(Denmark) C Pedersen (Denmark) K Rytter Juhl	21	21

Quarterfinals
1	(Bulgaria) P Nedelcheva (Russia) A Russkikh	21	15	21
(Denmark) L Damkjær Kruse (Denmark) M Schjøtt-Kristensen	14	21	17
(England) M Agathangelou (England) H Olver	19	11
(Denmark) C Pedersen (Denmark) K Rytter Juhl	21	21

Semifinals
1	(Bulgaria) P Nedelcheva (Russia) A Russkikh	18	21	21
(Denmark) C Pedersen (Denmark) K Rytter Juhl	21	15	16

=== Bottom half ===
First Round
(France) J Delaune (France) T Vignes	2	4
(United States) E Lee (United States) P L Obanana	21	21
(Denmark) A Skelbæk (Denmark) M Helsbøl	21	21
(France) L Baumann (France) C Sehier	7	8
(Denmark) L Frier Kristiansen (Denmark) M Røpke	21	21
(France) E Lefel (France) M Luttmann	10	11
(Poland) M Kurdelska (Poland) N Pocztowiak	21	21
(France) L Meheust (France) L Tyberghein	11	12

Second Round
(United States) E Lee (United States) P L Obanana	16	21	21
6	(France) L Choinet (France) W Rasidi	21	8	14
(Denmark) A Skelbæk (Denmark) M Helsbøl	13	6
3	(Thailand) D Aroonkesorn (Thailand) K Voravichitchaikul	21	21
(Denmark) L Frier Kristiansen (Denmark) M Røpke	21	20	21
7	(England) J Wallwork (England) G White	16	22	19
(Poland) M Kurdelska (Poland) N Pocztowiak	18	16
2	(Russia) N Vislova (Russia) V Sorokina	21	21

Quarterfinals
(United States) E Lee (United States) P L Obanana
3	(Thailand) D Aroonkesorn (Thailand) K Voravichitchaikul	w/o
(Denmark) L Frier Kristiansen (Denmark) M Røpke	w/o
2	(Russia) N Vislova (Russia) V Sorokina

Semifinals
3	(Thailand) D Aroonkesorn (Thailand) K Voravichitchaikul	21	21
(Denmark) L Frier Kristiansen (Denmark) M Røpke	9	15

=== Final ===
Final
1	(Bulgaria) Petya Nedelcheva (Russia) Anastasia Russkikh	16	2^{2}
3	(Thailand) Duanganong Aroonkesorn (Thailand) Kunchala Voravichitchaikul	21	11

== Mixed doubles ==
1. (Indonesia) Hendra Aprida Gunawan / Vita Marissa
2. (Poland) Robert Mateusiak / Nadieżda Zieba
3. (Denmark) Thomas Laybourn / Kamilla Rytter Juhl
4. (Thailand) Sudket Prapakamol / Saralee Thoungthongkam
5. (Denmark) Joachim Fischer Nielsen / Christinna Pedersen
6. (England) Nathan Robertson / Jenny Wallwork
7. (Germany) Michael Fuchs / Birgit Overzier
8. (Thailand) Songphon Anugritayawon / Kunchala Voravichitchaikul

=== Top half ===
First Round
1	(Indonesia) H A Gunawan (Indonesia) V Marissa	12	21	21
(Russia) V Durkin (Russia) N Vislova	21	18	15
(Germany) J Schöttler (Germany) S Marinello	21	21
Q4	(France) L Claerbout (France) C Sehier	13	10
7	(Germany) M Fuchs (Germany) B Overzier	21	21
Q1	(France) S Bourbon (France) J Delaune	7	11
PFQ	(Denmark) M Pieler Kolding (Denmark) J Houmann	19	21	21
(Indonesia) T K Wardana (Indonesia) N Melati	21	14	19
3	(Denmark) T Laybourn (Denmark) K Rytter Juhl	21	21
(United States) H H Ho (United States) E Lee	7	6
Q2	(France) J Grosjean (France) A Fontaine	11	12
(Bulgaria) S Makarski (Bulgaria) D Dimova	21	21
5	(Denmark) J Fischer Nielsen (Denmark) C Pedersen	21	21
(Croatia) Z Đurkinjak (Croatia) S Poznanović	8	18
(Indonesia) H Setiawan (Russia) A Russkikh	21	21
(Netherlands) R Bosch (Netherlands) L Jonathans	11	18

Second Round
1	(Indonesia) H A Gunawan (Indonesia) V Marissa	21	21
(Germany) J Schöttler (Germany) S Marinello	8	19
7	(Germany) M Fuchs (Germany) B Overzier	21	21
PFQ	(Denmark) M Pieler Kolding (Denmark) J Houmann	15	17
3	(Denmark) T Laybourn (Denmark) K Rytter Juhl	21	21
(Bulgaria) S Makarski (Bulgaria) D Dimova	5	14
5	(Denmark) J Fischer Nielsen (Denmark) C Pedersen	21	10	14
(Indonesia) H Setiawan (Russia) A Russkikh	16	21	21

Quarterfinals
1	(Indonesia) H A Gunawan (Indonesia) V Marissa	16	21	16
7	(Germany) M Fuchs (Germany) B Overzier	21	9	21
3	(Denmark) T Laybourn (Denmark) K Rytter Juhl	23	15	27
(Indonesia) H Setiawan (Russia) A Russkikh	21	21	25

Semifinals
7	(Germany) M Fuchs (Germany) B Overzier	17
3	(Denmark) T Laybourn (Denmark) K Rytter Juhl	10^{r}

=== Bottom half ===
First Round
(Poland) A Cwalina (Poland) M Kurdelska	18	21	17
(Ukraine) V Atrashchenkov (Ukraine) E Prus	21	19	21
(Poland) L Moren (Poland) N Pocztowiak	14	10
6	(England) N Robertson (England) J Wallwork	21	21
(Switzerland) A Dumartheray (Switzerland) S Jaquet	21	15	12
(England) C Adcock (Scotland) I Bankier	18	21	21
PFQ	(France) S Grosjean (France) E Lefel	7	10
4	(Thailand) S Prapakamol (Thailand) S Thoungthongkam
(Indonesia) F Limpele (Netherlands) Yao J	w/o
(France) B Careme (France) L Choinet
(Poland) W Szkudlarczyk (Poland) A Wojtkowska	11	12
8	(Thailand) S Anugritayawon (Thailand) K Voravichitchaikul	21	21
(Denmark) M Delbo Larsen (Denmark) M Schjøtt-Kristensen	16	21	21
(Ukraine) D Zavadsky (Ukraine) M Diptan	21	16	16
Q3	(France) R Labar (France) W Rasidi	11	11
2	(Poland) R Mateusiak (Poland) N Zieba	21	21

Second Round
(Ukraine) V Atrashchenkov (Ukraine) E Prus	16	13
6	(England) N Robertson (England) J Wallwork	21	21
(England) C Adcock (Scotland) I Bankier	14	11
4	(Thailand) S Prapakamol (Thailand) S Thoungthongkam	21	21
(France) B Careme (France) L Choinet	13	16
8	(Thailand) S Anugritayawon (Thailand) K Voravichitchaikul	21	21
(Denmark) M Delbo Larsen (Denmark) M Schjøtt-Kristensen	14	24
2	(Poland) R Mateusiak (Poland) N Zieba	21	26

Quarterfinals
6	(England) N Robertson (England) J Wallwork	20	21	19
4	(Thailand) S Prapakamol (Thailand) S Thoungthongkam	22	17	21
8	(Thailand) S Anugritayawon (Thailand) K Voravichitchaikul	21	21
2	(Poland) R Mateusiak (Poland) N Zieba	18	19

Semifinals
4	(Thailand) S Prapakamol (Thailand) S Thoungthongkam	w/o
8	(Thailand) S Anugritayawon (Thailand) K Voravichitchaikul

=== Final ===
Final
7	(Germany) Michael Fuchs (Germany) Birgit Overzier	15	15
4	(Thailand) Sudket Prapakamol (Thailand) Saralee Thoungthongkam	21	21

Preceded by 2009 French Super Series	French Super Series	Succeeded by 2011 French Super Series
Preceded by 2010 Denmark Super Series	2010 BWF Super Series	Succeeded by 2010 China Open Super Series
