= 2010 European Badminton Championships =

Tournament details
- Dates: 14–18 April 2010
- Venue: Manchester Evening News Arena
- Location: Manchester, England

Champions
- Men's singles: (Denmark) Peter Gade
- Women's singles: (Denmark) Tine Rasmussen
- Men's doubles: (Denmark) Lars Paaske (Denmark) Jonas Rasmussen
- Women's doubles: (Russia) Valeria Sorokina (Russia) Nina Vislova
- Mixed doubles: (Denmark) Thomas Laybourn (Denmark) Kamilla Rytter Juhl

The 2010 European Badminton Championships were the 22nd tournament of the European Badminton Championships. They were held in Manchester, England, from April 14 to April 18, 2010, and they were organised by the Badminton Europe and the Badminton England. Venue of this event was the Manchester Evening News Arena.

== Medalists ==
Event	Gold	Silver	Bronze
Men's singles	(Denmark) Peter Gade	(Denmark) Jan Ø. Jørgensen	(Germany) Marc Zwiebler
Men's singles	(Denmark) Peter Gade	(Denmark) Jan Ø. Jørgensen	(England) Rajiv Ouseph
Women's singles	(Denmark) Tine Rasmussen	(Germany) Juliane Schenk	(France) Pi Hongyan
Women's singles	(Denmark) Tine Rasmussen	(Germany) Juliane Schenk	(Russia) Ella Diehl
Men's doubles	(Denmark) Lars Paaske & Jonas Rasmussen	(Denmark) Mathias Boe & Carsten Mogensen	(Denmark) Kasper Faust Henriksen & Anders Kristiansen
Men's doubles	(Denmark) Lars Paaske & Jonas Rasmussen	(Denmark) Mathias Boe & Carsten Mogensen	(Germany) Michael Fuchs & Ingo Kindervater
Women's doubles	(Russia) Valeria Sorokina & Nina Vislova	(Bulgaria) Petya Nedelcheva (Russia) Anastasia Russkikh	(England) Mariana Agathangelou & Heather Olver
Women's doubles	(Russia) Valeria Sorokina & Nina Vislova	(Bulgaria) Petya Nedelcheva (Russia) Anastasia Russkikh	(Denmark) Line Damkjær Kruse & Mie Schjøtt-Kristensen
Mixed doubles	(Denmark) Thomas Laybourn & Kamilla Rytter Juhl	(Poland) Robert Mateusiak & Nadieżda Kostiuczyk	(Belgium) Wouter Claes & Nathalie Descamps
Mixed doubles	(Denmark) Thomas Laybourn & Kamilla Rytter Juhl	(Poland) Robert Mateusiak & Nadieżda Kostiuczyk	(England) Nathan Robertson & Jenny Wallwork

== Results ==
=== Men's singles ===
Quarterfinals
1	(Denmark) Peter Gade	21	21
8	(England) Carl Baxter	14	11
3	(Germany) Marc Zwiebler	19	21	21
5	(Netherlands) Dicky Palyama	21	10	16
(Republic of Ireland) Scott Evans	21	21	12
4	(England) Rajiv Ouseph	15	23	21
6	(Denmark) Joachim Persson	13	17
2	(Denmark) Jan Ø. Jørgensen	21	21

Semifinals
1	(Denmark) Peter Gade	18	21	21
3	(Germany) Marc Zwiebler	21	12	17
4	(England) Rajiv Ouseph	14	20
2	(Denmark) Jan Ø. Jørgensen	21	21

Finals
1	(Denmark) Peter Gade	21	21
2	(Denmark) Jan Ø. Jørgensen	14	11

=== Women's singles ===
Quarterfinals
1	(France) Pi Hongyan	21	14	21
5	(Bulgaria) Petya Nedelcheva	15	21	12
3	(Germany) Juliane Schenk	21	16	21
7	(Netherlands) Judith Meulendijks	16	21	15
6	(Russia) Ella Diehl	21	21
4	(Netherlands) Jie Yao	18	17
8	(Scotland) Susan Egelstaff	8	16
2	(Denmark) Tine Rasmussen	21	21

Semifinals
1	(France) Pi Hongyan	14	13
3	(Germany) Juliane Schenk	21	21
6	(Russia) Ella Diehl	14	16
2	(Denmark) Tine Rasmussen	21	21

Finals
3	(Germany) Juliane Schenk	19	21	18
2	(Denmark) Tine Rasmussen	21	14	21

=== Men's doubles ===
Quarterfinals
1	(Denmark) Boe; Mogensen	21	21
(Poland) Cwalina; Logosz	11	12
4	(Denmark) Faust Henricksen; Kristiansen	21	21
(Netherlands) de Ruiter; Khodabux	18	16
(Germany) Fuchs; Kindervater	21	13	21
(England) Ellis; Mills	10	21	11
(England) Adcock (Scotland) Blair	20	15
2	(Denmark) Paaske; Rasmussen	22	21

Semifinals
1	(Denmark) Boe/Mogensen	21	21
4	(Denmark) Faust Henricksen/Kristiansen	10	15
(Germany) Fuchs/Kindervater	10	12
2	(Denmark) Paaske/Rasmussen	21	21

Finals
1	(Denmark) Boe/Mogensen	22	20
2	(Denmark) Paaske/Rasmussen	24	22

=== Women's doubles ===
Quarterfinals
1	(Bulgaria) Nedelcheva/ (Russia) Russkikh	21	17	21
(Denmark) Kristiansen/Røpke	15	21	6
3	(France) Choinet/Rasidim	15	21	11
(England) Agathangelou/Olver	21	17	21
(Germany) Marinello/Overzier	21	14	16
4	(Denmark) Damkjær Kruse/Schjøtt-Kristensen	16	21	21
(Scotland) Bankier/Mason	14	12
2	(Russia) Sorokina/Vislova	21	21

Semifinals
1	(Bulgaria) Nedelcheva/ (Russia) Russkikh	21	21
(England) Agathangelou/Olver	18	13
4	(Denmark) Damkjær Kruse/Schjøtt-Kristensen	11	16
2	(Russia) Sorokina/Vislova	21	21

Finals
1	(Bulgaria) Nedelcheva/ (Russia) Russkikh	18	14
2	(Russia) Sorokina/Vislova	21	21

=== Mixed doubles ===
Quarterfinals
1	(Denmark) Laybourn/Rytter Juhl	21	21
(Poland) Szkudlarczyk/Wojtkowska	8	10
(Germany) Kindervater/Overzier	15	21	17
(Belgium) Claes/Descamps	21	19	21
(Russia) Nikolaenko/Sorokina	17	18
3	(England) Robertson/Wallwork	21	21
8	(Ukraine) Atrashchenkov/Prus	10	5
2	(Poland) Mateusiak/Kostiuczyk	21	21

Semifinals
1	(Denmark) Laybourn/Rytter Juhl	21	21
(Belgium) Claes/Descamps	8	14
3	(England) Robertson/Wallwork	18	21	9
2	(Poland) Mateusiak/Kostiuczyk	21	18	21

Finals
1	(Denmark) Laybourn/Rytter Juhl	21	18	21
2	(Poland) Mateusiak/Kostiuczyk	19	21	12

* Carsten Mogensen was given a red card after the game for kicking his racquet into the crowd.

== Medal count ==
Pos	Country	Gold	Silver	Bronze	Total
1	Denmark	4	2	2	8
2	Russia	1	0.5	1	3
3	Germany	0	1	2	3
4	Poland	0	1	0	1
5	England	0	0	3	3
7	France	0	0	1	1
7	Belgium	0	0	1	1
8	Bulgaria	0	0.5	0	0.5
