= Robert Adcock =

English badminton player (born 1986)

Personal information
- Born: 9 August 1986 (age 40) Leicester, United Kingdom
- Height: 193 cm (6 ft 4 in)

Sport
- Country: England
- Sport: Badminton
- Handedness: right

Men's & mixed doubles
- Highest ranking: 105 (MD 21 January 2010); 41 (XD 8 October 2009)
- BWF profile
Medal record
Men's badminton
Representing England
European Mixed Team Championships
Silver medal – second place	2008 Herning	Mixed team
European Junior Championships
Silver medal – second place	2005 Den Bosch	Boys' doubles
Silver medal – second place	2005 Den Bosch	Mixed doubles

Robert Adcock (born 9 August 1986) is an English badminton player. In 2005, he won the boys' and mixed doubles title at the English National Junior Championships partnered with Edward Foster and Jennifer Wallwork repeating the success with the same partners of the under 17 national championships in 2003. In his under 19 year, he also won the boys' and mixed doubles silver medals at the European Junior Championships. He won bronze medal at the 2006 World University Championships in Wuhan, China, in the mixed doubles event partnered with Hayley Connor. In 2007, Adcock competed at the World Championships in Kuala Lumpur, Malaysia in the men's doubles event with Robin Middleton, and in 2008, he competed at the European Championships. Adcock who was partnered with Middleton was defeated in the quarter finals round to the 4th seeded German pair Kristof Hopp and Ingo Kindervater in the straight games.

He also represented England men's team competed at the 2008 Thomas Cup in Jakarta, Indonesia & the European mixed team championships in Denmark in 2007. Adcock was the men's doubles champion at the 2006 Czech International with Middleton, and mixed doubles champion at the 2009 Austrian International tournament with Heather Olver. He retired from professional badminton in 2009 at 22 years old with 5 full senior international caps tor England. His younger brother, Chris Adcock, is also a badminton player.

== Personal life ==
Robert Adcock and Hayley Connor took their partnership to new levels when they wed in Ascot in 2013.

== Achievements ==
=== European Junior Championships ===
Boys' doubles
Year	Venue	Partner	Opponent	Score	Result
2005	De Maaspoort; Den Bosch, Netherlands	(England) Edward Foster	(Denmark) Rasmus Bonde (Denmark) Kasper Henriksen	10–15, 9–15	Silver

Mixed doubles
Year	Venue	Partner	Opponent	Score	Result
2005	De Maaspoort; Den Bosch, Netherlands	(England) Jennifer Wallwork	(Denmark) Rasmus Bonde (Denmark) Christinna Pedersen	8–15, 5–15	Silver

=== BWF International Challenge/Series ===
Men's doubles
Year	Tournament	Partner	Opponent	Score	Result
2007	Dutch International	(England) Robin Middleton	(England) Kristian Roebuck (Scotland) Andrew Bowman	11–21, 9–21	(silver) Runner-up
2006	Czech International	(England) Robin Middleton	(England) Dean George (England) Chris Tonks	18–21, 21–11, 21–19	(gold) Winner

Mixed doubles
Year	Tournament	Partner	Opponent	Score	Result
2009	Austrian International	(England) Heather Olver	(Ukraine) Valeriy Atrashchenkov (Ukraine) Elena Prus	21–17, 21–18	(gold) Winner
2009	Swedish International	(England) Heather Olver	(Ukraine) Valeriy Atrashchenkov (Ukraine) Elena Prus	16–21, 11–21	(silver) Runner-up
2008	Scottish International	(England) Heather Olver	(Germany) Michael Fuchs (Germany) Annekatrin Lillie	16–21, 12–21	(silver) Runner-up

BWF International Challenge tournament
BWF International Series tournament
