= Anastasia Prokopenko =

Russian badminton player (born 1986)

Personal information
- Born: Anastasia Yuryevna Prokopenko (Анастасия Юрьевна Прокопенко); 17 May 1986 (age 40) Krasnoyarsk Krai, Russian SFSR, Soviet Union

Sport
- Country: Russia
- Sport: Badminton

Women's singles & doubles
- Highest ranking: 29 (WS, 25 August 2011); 71 (WD, 21 January 2010); 64 (XD, 8 July 2010)
- BWF profile
Medal record
Women's badminton
Representing Russia
European Women's Team Championships
Silver medal – second place	2010 Warsaw	Women's team
European Junior Championships
Silver medal – second place	2005 Den Bosch	Mixed team
Bronze medal – third place	2005 Den Bosch	Girls' doubles

Anastasia Yuryevna Prokopenko (Russian: Анастасия Юрьевна Прокопенко; born 17 May 1986) is a Russian badminton player. She competed for Russia at the 2012 Summer Olympics in the women's singles event.

== Achievements ==
=== European Junior Championships ===
Girls' doubles
Year	Venue	Partner	Opponent	Score	Result	Ref.
2005	De Maaspoort, Den Bosch, Netherlands	(Russia) Anastasia Kudinova	(Denmark) Tine Kruse (Denmark) Christinna Pedersen	8–15, 16–17	Bronze	

=== BWF International Challenge/Series ===
Women's singles
Year	Tournament	Opponent	Score	Result
2010	Finnish Open	(Germany) Karin Schnaase	21–18, 21–18	(gold) Winner
2010	White Nights	(Russia) Tatjana Bibik	21–11, 8–21, 17–21	(silver) Runner-up
2011	Denmark International	(Italy) Agnese Allegrini	21–15, 21–15	(gold) Winner

Women's doubles
Year	Tournament	Partner	Opponent	Score	Result
2006	Lithuanian International	(Russia) Elena Chernyavskya	(Lithuania) Akvilė Stapušaitytė (Latvia) Kristīne Šefere	21–10, 15–21, 21–14	(gold) Winner
2006	Bulgarian International	(Russia) Elena Chernyavskya	(Bulgaria) Diana Dimova (Bulgaria) Petya Nedelcheva	18–21, 13–21	(silver) Runner-up
2008	Austrian International	(Russia) Olga Golovanova	(China) Cai Jiani (China) Yu Qi	16–21, 8–21	(silver) Runner-up
2008	Romanian International	(Russia) Olga Golovanova	(United States) Eva Lee (United States) Mesinee Mangkalakiri	21–18, 21–15	(gold) Winner
2008	Hungarian International	(Russia) Olga Golovanova	(Bulgaria) Petya Nedelcheva (Bulgaria) Dimitriya Popstoykova	21–12, 10–21, 21–12	(gold) Winner
2009	White Nights	(Russia) Anastasia Russkikh	(Russia) Valeri Sorokina (Russia) Nina Vislova	19–21, 21–13, 17–21	(silver) Runner-up

Mixed doubles
Year	Tournament	Partner	Opponent	Score	Result
2008	Hungarian International	(Russia) Ivan Sozonov	(Russia) Vitalij Durkin (Russia) Nina Vislova	11–21, 19–21	(silver) Runner-up
2009	Kharkiv International	(Russia) Andrey Ashmarin	(Ukraine) Valeriy Atrashchenkov (Ukraine) Elena Prus	Walkover	(silver) Runner-up
2010	Finnish Open	(Russia) Andrey Ashmarin	(Denmark) Mikkel Delbo Larsen (Denmark) Mie Schjøtt-Kristensen	12–21, 18–21	(silver) Runner-up
2010	Polish Open	(Russia) Andrey Ashmarin	(Singapore) Chayut Triyachart (Singapore) Yao Lei	21–12, 21–17	(gold) Winner

BWF International Challenge tournament
BWF International Series tournament
BWF Future Series tournament
