= Rasmus Bonde =

Danish badminton player (born 1986)

Personal information
- Born: Rasmus Bonde Nissen; 26 September 1986 (age 40)

Sport
- Country: Denmark
- Sport: Badminton

Men's & mixed doubles
- Highest ranking: 23 (MD 23 May 2013); 45 (XD 21 January 2010)
- BWF profile
Medal record
Men's badminton
Representing Denmark
Sudirman Cup
Bronze medal – third place	2013 Kuala Lumpur	Mixed team
European Championships
Bronze medal – third place	2012 Karlskrona	Men's doubles
European Men's Team Championships
Gold medal – first place	2012 Amsterdam	Men's team
Gold medal – first place	2010 Warsaw	Men's team
European Junior Championships
Gold medal – first place	2005 Den Bosch	Boys' doubles
Gold medal – first place	2005 Den Bosch	Mixed doubles
Gold medal – first place	2005 Den Bosch	Mixed team

Rasmus Bonde Nissen (born 26 September 1986) is a Danish badminton player.

== Career ==
Bonde won three gold medals at the 2005 European Junior Championships in the boys' doubles, mixed doubles and mixed team event. In 2007, he won the amongst others the Swedish International, Czech International, Dutch Open, Portugal International, and in 2009 at the Norwegian International, and the Spanish International.

== Achievements ==
=== European Championships ===
Men's doubles
Year	Venue	Partner	Opponent	Score	Result
2012	Telenor Arena; Karlskrona, Sweden	(Denmark) Anders Kristiansen	(Germany) Michael Fuchs (Germany) Oliver Roth	18–21, 21–17, 14–21	Bronze

=== European Junior Championships ===
Boys' doubles
Year	Venue	Partner	Opponent	Score	Result
2005	De Maaspoort; Den Bosch, Netherlands	(Denmark) Kasper Henriksen	(England) Robert Adcock (England) Edward Foster	15–10, 15–5	Gold

Mixed doubles
Year	Venue	Partner	Opponent	Score	Result
2005	De Maaspoort; Den Bosch, Netherlands	(Denmark) Christinna Pedersen	(England) Robert Adcock (England) Jennifer Wallwork	15–8, 15–5	Gold

=== BWF Grand Prix ===
The BWF Grand Prix has two levels: Grand Prix and Grand Prix Gold. It is a series of badminton tournaments, sanctioned by the Badminton World Federation (BWF) since 2007.

Mixed doubles
Year	Tournament	Partner	Opponent	Score	Result
2007	Dutch Open	(Denmark) Christinna Pedersen	(Singapore) Hendri Kurniawan Saputra (Singapore) Li Yujia	21–16, 21–14	(gold) Winner

BWF Grand Prix Gold tournament
BWF Grand Prix tournament

=== BWF International Challenge/Series ===
Men's doubles
Year	Tournament	Partner	Opponent	Score	Result
2012	Denmark International	(Denmark) Kasper Antonsen	(Denmark) Christian John Skovgaard (Denmark) Mads Pieler Kolding	17–21, 10–21	(silver) Runner-up
2011	Norwegian International	(Denmark) Anders Kristiansen	(Poland) Adam Cwalina (Poland) Michal Logosz	21–17, 21–18	(gold) Winner
2011	Denmark International	(Denmark) Anders Kristiansen	(Denmark) Mikkel Elbjørn Larsen (Denmark) Christian John Skovgaard	21–14, 19–21, 21–16	(gold) Winner
2009	Norwegian International	(Denmark) Simon Mollyhus	(Germany) Kristof Hopp (Germany) Johannes Schöttler	18–21, 21–17, 21–19	(gold) Winner
2009	Spanish International	(Denmark) Mikkel Delbo Larsen	(England) Dean George (England) Chris Langridge	26–24, 23–21	(gold) Winner
2009	Finnish International	(Denmark) Mikkel Delbo Larsen	(Chinese Taipei) Chen Hung-ling (Chinese Taipei) Lin Yu-lang	19–21, 16–21	(silver) Runner-up
2009	Le Volant d'Or de Toulouse	(Denmark) Mikkel Delbo Larsen	(England) Chris Langridge (England) Robin Middleton	11–21, 19–21	(silver) Runner-up
2008	Dutch International	(Denmark) Kasper Henriksen	(Germany) Kristof Hopp (Germany) Ingo Kindervater	21–13, 16–21, 18–21	(silver) Runner-up
2007	Czech International	(Denmark) Kasper Henriksen	(Belgium) Frédéric Mawet (Belgium) Wouter Claes	21–17, 18–21, 21–18	(gold) Winner
2007	Swedish International	(Denmark) Kasper Henriksen	(Indonesia) Imam Sodikin (Sweden) Imanuel Hirschfeld	14–21, 10–21	(silver) Runner-up
2006	Irish International	(Denmark) Kasper Henriksen	(Germany) Thomas Tesche (Germany) Jochen Cassel	16–21, 19–21	(silver) Runner-up
2006	Portugal International	(Denmark) Kasper Henriksen	(Denmark) Anders Kristiansen (Denmark) Simon Mollyhus	21–16, 15–21, 18–21	(silver) Runner-up

Mixed doubles
Year	Tournament	Partner	Opponent	Score	Result
2011	Norwegian International	(Denmark) Maria Helsbøl	(Republic of Ireland) Sam Magee (Republic of Ireland) Chloe Magee	17–21, 16–21	(silver) Runner-up
2011	Denmark International	(Denmark) Maria Helsbøl	(Denmark) Mads Pieler Kolding (Denmark) Julie Houmann	13–21, 15–21	(silver) Runner-up
2009	Le Volant d'Or de Toulouse	(Denmark) Britta Andersen	(Poland) Robert Mateusiak (Poland) Nadieżda Kostiuczyk	10–21, 11–21	(silver) Runner-up
2008	Czech International	(Denmark) Helle Nielsen	(Denmark) Mikkel Delbo Larsen (Denmark) Mie Schjøtt-Kristensen	21–12, 21–11	(gold) Winner
2008	Dutch International	(Denmark) Helle Nielsen	(Denmark) Jacob Chemnitz (Denmark) Marie Røpke	21–15, 21–12	(gold) Winner
2007	Czech International	(Denmark) Christinna Pedersen	(Russia) Anton Nazarenko (Russia) Elena Chernyavskaya	21–19, 21–12	(gold) Winner
2007	Portugal International	(Denmark) Christinna Pedersen	(Denmark) Mikkel Delbo Larsen (Denmark) Mie Schjøtt-Kristensen	21–12, 21–6	(gold) Winner
2007	Swedish International	(Denmark) Christinna Pedersen	(Denmark) Jacob Chemnitz (Denmark) Julie Houmann	21–12, 21–8	(gold) Winner
2006	Czech International	(Denmark) Christinna Pedersen	(England) Robin Middleton (England) Liza Parker	16–21, 12–21	(silver) Runner-up
2006	Portugal International	(Denmark) Christinna Pedersen	(Denmark) Rasmus Andersen (Denmark) Mie Schjøtt-Kristensen	13–21, 21–14, 18–21	(silver) Runner-up
2006	Finnish International	(Denmark) Christinna Pedersen	(Denmark) Jonas Rasmussen (Denmark) Britta Andersen	11–21, 15–21	(silver) Runner-up

BWF International Challenge tournament
BWF International Series tournament

=== Invitation Tournament ===
Men's doubles
Year	Tournament	Partner	Opponent	Score	Result
2012	Copenhagen Masters	(Denmark) Mads Conrad-Petersen	(Denmark) Mads Pieler Kolding (Denmark) Carsten Mogensen	23–21, 16–21, 21–23	(silver) Runner-up
