= Andrei Ivanov (badminton) =

Russian badminton player (born 1987)

Andrei Ivanov Андрей Иванов
Personal information
- Born: Andrei Konstantinovich Ivanov (Андрей Константинович Иванов); 7 February 1987 (age 39) Omsk, Russian SFSR, Soviet Union

Sport
- Country: Russia
- Sport: Badminton

Men's singles & doubles
- Highest ranking: 176 (MS 21 January 2010); 59 (MD 8 July 2010); 243 (XD 22 October 2009)
- BWF profile
Medal record
Men's badminton
Representing Russia
European Junior Championships
| Silver medal – second place | 2005 Den Bosch | Mixed team |

Andrei Konstantinovich Ivanov (Russian: Андрей Константинович Иванов; born 7 February 1987) is a Russian badminton player.

== Achievements ==
=== BWF International Challenge/Series ===
Men's doubles
| Year | Tournament | Partner | Opponent | Score | Result |
|---|---|---|---|---|---|
| 2009 | Kharkiv International | (Russia) Andrey Ashmarin | (Ukraine) Valeriy Atrashchenkov (Ukraine) Vladislav Druzchenko | 21–16, 23–21 | (gold) Winner |
| 2010 | Finnish Open | (Russia) Andrey Ashmarin | (France) Laurent Constantin (France) Sébastien Vincent | 21–11, 17–21, 11–21 | (silver) Runner-up |
| 2016 | Latvia International | (Russia) Anton Nazarenko | (Russia) Vladimir Nikulov (Russia) Artem Serpionov | 21–16, 21–15 | (gold) Winner |
| 2016 | Lithuanian International | (Russia) Anton Nazarenko | (Poland) Łukasz Moreń (Poland) Wojciech Szkudlarczyk | 21–11, 17–21, 19–21 | (silver) Runner-up |

Mixed doubles
| Year | Tournament | Partner | Opponent | Score | Result |
|---|---|---|---|---|---|
| 2006 | Lithuanian International | (Russia) Elena Chernyavskaya | (Poland) Adam Cwalina (Poland) Małgorzata Kurdelska | 10–21, 15–21 | (silver) Runner-up |
| 2016 | Bulgarian International | (Russia) Ksenia Evgenova | (Russia) Rodion Alimov (Russia) Alina Davletova | Walkover | (silver) Runner-up |

BWF International Challenge tournament
BWF International Series tournament
BWF Future Series tournament
