= 2005 European Junior Badminton Championships =

Tournament details
- Dates: 19–27 March 2005
- Location: Den Bosch, North Brabant, Netherlands

The 2005 European Junior Badminton Championships were held in Den Bosch, Netherlands, between March 19 and March 27, 2005.

== Medalists ==
Event	Gold	Silver	Bronze
Mixed team	Denmark; Rasmus Bonde; Kasper Henriksen; Jan Ø. Jørgensen; Morten Spurr Madsen; Ulrik Nielsen; Hans-Kristian Vittinghus; Tinne Kruse; Dorte Matthiesen; Christinna Pedersen; Marie Røpke	Russia; Maxim Danchenko; Mikhail Gorokhov; Andrei Ivanov; Vladimir Ivanov; Konstantin Khlestov; Alexey Kuzevanov; Vladimir Malkov; Elena Baranova; Elena Chernyavskaya; Olga Kozlova; Anastasia Kudinova; Anastasia Prokopenko; Nina Vislova; Maria Zarembovskaya	Germany; Dieter Domke; Hannes Käsbauer; Peter Käsbauer; Hannes Roffmann; Jan-Sören Schulz; Tim Zander; KIm Buss; Monja Giebmanns; Janet Köhler; Mona Reich; Neele Voigt
Men's singles	(England) Rajiv Ouseph	(Germany) Dieter Domke	(Scotland) Calum Menzies
Men's singles	(England) Rajiv Ouseph	(Germany) Dieter Domke	(Denmark) Hans-Kristian Vittinghus
Women's singles	(Germany) Janet Köhler	(Switzerland) Jeanine Cicognini	(Bulgaria) Linda Zetchiri
Women's singles	(Germany) Janet Köhler	(Switzerland) Jeanine Cicognini	(Czech Republic) Pavla Janošová
Men's doubles	(Denmark) Rasmus Bonde (Denmark) Kasper Henriksen	(England) Robert Adcock (England) Edward Foster	(France) Brice Leverdez (France) Matthieu Lo Ying Ping
Men's doubles	(Denmark) Rasmus Bonde (Denmark) Kasper Henriksen	(England) Robert Adcock (England) Edward Foster	(Germany) Jan-Sören Schulz (Germany) Tim Zander
Women's doubles	(Russia) Olga Kozlova (Russia) Nina Vislova	(Denmark) Tinne Kruse (Denmark) Christinna Pedersen	(Belarus) Olga Konon (Czech Republic) Kristína Ludíková
Women's doubles	(Russia) Olga Kozlova (Russia) Nina Vislova	(Denmark) Tinne Kruse (Denmark) Christinna Pedersen	(Russia) Anastasia Kudinova (Russia) Anastasia Prokopenko
Mixed doubles	(Denmark) Rasmus Bonde (Denmark) Christinna Pedersen	(England) Robert Adcock (England) Jennifer Wallwork	(Russia) Vladimir Ivanov (Russia) Olga Kozlova
Mixed doubles	(Denmark) Rasmus Bonde (Denmark) Christinna Pedersen	(England) Robert Adcock (England) Jennifer Wallwork	(Russia) Vladimir Malkov (Russia) Nina Vislova

== Results ==
=== Semi-finals ===
Category	Winner	Runner-up	Score
Boys' singles	(England) Rajiv Ouseph	(Scotland) Calum Menzies	15–0, 15–4
Boys' singles	(Germany) Dieter Domke	(Denmark) Hans-Kristian Vittinghus	15–10, 15–7
Girls' singles	(Germany) Janet Köhler	(Czech Republic) Pavla Janošová	13–10, 11–3
Girls' singles	(Switzerland) Jeanine Cicognini	(Bulgaria) Linda Zetchiri	11–5, 11–5
Boys' doubles	(Denmark) Rasmus Bonde (Denmark) Kasper Henriksen	(France) Brice Leverdez (France) Matthieu Lo Ying Ping	11–15, 15–8, 15–7
Boys' doubles	(England) Robert Adcock (England) Edward Foster	(Germany) Jan-Sören Schulz (Germany) Tim Zander	15–5, 15–10
Girls' doubles	(Denmark) Tinne Kruse (Denmark) Christinna Pedersen	(Russia) Anastasia Kudinova (Russia) Anastasia Prokopenko	15–8, 17–16
Girls' doubles	(Russia) Olga Kozlova (Russia) Nina Vislova	(Belarus) Olga Konon (Czech Republic) Kristína Ludíková	15–5, 15–12
Mixed doubles	(Denmark) Rasmus Bonde (Denmark) Christinna Pedersen	(Russia) Vladimir Ivanov (Russia) Olga Kozlova	15–10, 15–8
Mixed doubles	(England) Robert Adcock (England) Jennifer Wallwork	(Russia) Vladimir Malkov (Russia) Nina Vislova	15–4, 15–5

=== Finals ===
Category	Winners	Runners-up	Score
Men's singles	(England) Rajiv Ouseph	(Germany) Dieter Domke	15–0, 15–4
Women's singles	(Germany) Janet Köhler	(Switzerland) Jeanine Cicognini	11–5, 11–9
Men's doubles	(Denmark) Rasmus Bonde (Denmark) Kasper Henriksen	(England) Robert Adcock (England) Edward Foster	15–10, 15–5
Women's doubles	(Russia) Olga Kozlova (Russia) Nina Vislova	(Denmark) Tinne Kruse (Denmark) Christinna Pedersen	13–15, 15–7, 17–16
Mixed doubles	(Denmark) Rasmus Bonde (Denmark) Christinna Pedersen	(England) Robert Adcock (England) Jennifer Wallwork	15–8, 15–5
