= Kasper Henriksen =

Danish badminton player (born 1986)

Personal information
- Born: Kasper Faust Henriksen; 11 March 1986 (age 40)

Sport
- Country: Denmark
- Sport: Badminton

Men's & mixed doubles
- Highest ranking: 20 (MD) 26 Aug 2010; 97 (XD) 21 Jan 2010
- BWF profile
Medal record
Badminton
Representing Denmark
European Championships
Bronze medal – third place	2010 Manchester	Men's doubles
European Men's Team Championships
Gold medal – first place	2010 Warsaw	Men's team
European Junior Championships
Gold medal – first place	2005 Den Bosch	Boys' doubles
Gold medal – first place	2005 Den Bosch	Mixed team

Kasper Faust Henriksen (born 11 March 1986) is a Danish male badminton player. In 2005, he won gold medal at the European Junior Badminton Championships in boys' doubles event with his partner Rasmus Bonde. In 2010, he won the bronze medal at the European Badminton Championships in men's doubles event with his partner Anders Kristiansen.

== Achievements ==
=== European Championships ===
Men's doubles
Year	Venue	Partner	Opponent	Score	Result
2010	Manchester Evening News Arena; Manchester, England	(Denmark) Anders Kristiansen	(Denmark) Mathias Boe (Denmark) Carsten Mogensen	10–21, 15–21	Bronze

=== European Junior Championships ===
Boys' doubles
Year	Venue	Partner	Opponent	Score	Result
2005	De Maaspoort; Den Bosch, Netherlands	(Denmark) Rasmus Bonde	(England) Robert Adcock (England) Edward Foster	15–10, 15–5	Gold

=== BWF International Challenge/Series ===
Men's doubles
Year	Tournament	Partner	Opponent	Score	Result
2009	Bulgarian International	(Denmark) Anders Kristiansen	(Russia) Vladimir Ivanov (Russia) Ivan Sozonov	21–11, 21–11	(gold) Winner
2009	Polish International	(Denmark) Christian John Skovgaard	(Chinese Taipei) Chen Hung-ling (Chinese Taipei) Lin Yu-lang	14–21, 21–17, 19–21	(silver) Runner-up
2008	Hungarian International	(Denmark) Christian John Skovgaard	(Germany) Maurice Niesner (Germany) Till Zander	21–12, 21–12	(gold) Winner
2008	Czech International	(Denmark) Christian John Skovgaard	(Denmark) Jacob Chemnitz (Denmark) Mikkel Delbo Larsen	21–16, 21–16	(gold) Winner
2008	Dutch International	(Denmark) Rasmus Bonde	(Germany) Kristof Hopp (Germany) Ingo Kindervater	21–13, 16–21, 18–21	(silver) Runner-up
2007	Czech International	(Denmark) Rasmus Bonde	(Belgium) Frédéric Mawet (Belgium) Wouter Claes	21–17, 18–21, 21–18	(gold) Winner
2007	Swedish International	(Denmark) Rasmus Bonde	(Indonesia) Imam Sodikin (Sweden) Imanuel Hirschfeld	14–21, 10–21	(silver) Runner-up
2006	Irish International	(Denmark) Rasmus Bonde	(Germany) Thomas Tesche (Germany) Jochen Cassel	16–21, 19–21	(silver) Runner-up
2006	Portugal International	(Denmark) Rasmus Bonde	(Denmark) Anders Kristiansen (Denmark) Simon Mollyhus	21–16, 15–21, 18–21	(silver) Runner-up

Mixed doubles
Year	Tournament	Partner	Opponent	Score	Result
2008	Irish International	(Denmark) Britta Andersen	(Denmark) Jacob Chemnitz (Denmark) Marie Røpke	21–17, 17–21, 15–21	(silver) Runner-up

BWF International Challenge tournament
BWF International Series tournament
BWF Future Series tournament
