= Denmark Challenge =

Badminton championships

The Denmark Challenge is an international badminton tournament held in Denmark. This tournament has been an International Challenge level. Another tournament for higher level in the country is Denmark Open.

== Previous winners ==
Year	Men's singles	Women's singles	Men's doubles	Women's doubles	Mixed doubles	Ref
2011	(Denmark) Jan Ø. Jørgensen	(Russia) Anastasia Prokopenko	(Denmark) Rasmus Bonde (Denmark) Anders Kristiansen	(Denmark) Line Damkjær Kruse (Denmark) Marie Røpke	(Denmark) Mads Pieler Kolding (Denmark) Julie Houmann	
2012	(Sweden) Henri Hurskainen	(Denmark) Sandra-Maria Jensen	(Denmark) Christian Skovgaard (Denmark) Mads Pieler Kolding	(Denmark) Line Damkjær Kruse (Denmark) Marie Røpke	(Denmark) Mads Pieler Kolding (Denmark) Julie Houmann	
2013	(Denmark) Viktor Axelsen	(Germany) Olga Konon	(England) Marcus Ellis (Scotland) Paul van Rietvelde	(Denmark) Line Damkjær Kruse (Denmark) Marie Røpke	(Denmark) Anders Skaarup Rasmussen (Denmark) Lena Grebak	
2014– 2018	No competition					
2019	(Denmark) Hans-Kristian Vittinghus	(Denmark) Mia Blichfeldt	(Japan) Shohei Hoshino (Japan) Yujiro Nishikawa	(Japan) Saori Ozaki (Japan) Akane Watanabe	(France) Ronan Labar (France) Anne Tran	
2020	Cancelled (Note: This tournament, originally to be played from 7 to 10 May, was later cancelled due to the COVID-19 pandemic in Denmark.)					
2021	(Canada) Brian Yang	(Denmark) Line Christophersen	(Denmark) Daniel Lundgaard (Denmark) Mathias Thyrri	(Denmark) Amalie Magelund (Denmark) Freja Ravn	(Denmark) Jeppe Bay (Denmark) Sara Lundgaard	
2022	(Chinese Taipei) Lu Chia-hung	(Thailand) Pitchamon Opatniputh	(South Korea) Jin Yong (South Korea) Na Sung-seung	(Hong Kong) Yeung Nga Ting (Hong Kong) Yeung Pui Lam	(Indonesia) Dejan Ferdinansyah (Indonesia) Gloria Emanuelle Widjaja	
2023	(Chinese Taipei) Huang Yu-kai	(Estonia) Kristin Kuuba	(Denmark) Rasmus Kjær (Denmark) Frederik Søgaard	(Chinese Taipei) Hsieh Pei-shan (Chinese Taipei) Tseng Yu-chi	(India) Rohan Kapoor (India) N. Sikki Reddy	
2024	(Japan) Yushi Tanaka	(Japan) Riko Gunji	(Denmark) William Kryger Boe (Denmark) Christian Faust Kjær	(Thailand) Laksika Kanlaha (Thailand) Phataimas Muenwong	(Denmark) Jesper Toft (Denmark) Clara Graversen	
2025	(France) Arnaud Merklé	(India) Tanvi Sharma	(Indonesia) Raymond Indra (Indonesia) Nikolaus Joaquin	(Japan) Mikoto Aiso (Japan) Momoha Niimi	(Indonesia) Zaidan Nabawi (Indonesia) Jessica Rismawardani	
2026	(Israel) Daniil Dubovenko	(Germany) Yvonne Li	(Denmark) Christian Faust Kjær (Denmark) Rasmus Kjær	(Japan) Miku Sugiyama (Japan) Nana Takahashi	(England) Callum Hemming (England) Estelle van Leeuwen	

== Performances by countries ==
As of the 2026 edition

Pos	Country	MS	WS	MD	WD	XD	Total
1	Denmark	3	3	6	4	5	21
2	Japan	1	1	1	3		6
3	Chinese Taipei	2			1		3
3	Indonesia			1		2	3
5	France	1				1	2
5	Germany		2				2
5	India		1			1	2
5	Thailand		1		1		2
9	England			0.5		1	1.5
10	Canada	1					1
10	Estonia		1				1
10	Hong Kong				1		1
10	Israel	1					1
10	Russia		1				1
10	South Korea			1			1
10	Sweden	1					1
17	Scotland			0.5			0.5
Total		10	10	10	10	10	50
