= Tinne Kruse =

Danish badminton player (born 1986)

Personal information
- Born: 19 November 1986 (age 39)

Sport
- Country: Denmark
- Sport: Badminton

Women's Doubles & Mixed Doubles
- Highest ranking: 213 (WD) 20 Dec 2012; 412 (XD) 28 Mar 2013
- BWF profile
Medal record
Women's badminton
Representing Denmark
European Junior Championships
Gold medal – first place	2005 Den Bosch	Mixed team
Silver medal – second place	2005 Den Bosch	Girls' doubles

Tinne Kruse (born 19 November 1986) is a Danish female badminton player.

== Achievements ==
=== European Junior Championships ===
Girls' Doubles
Year	Venue	Partner	Opponent	Score	Result
2005	Den Bosch, Netherlands	(Denmark) Christinna Pedersen	(Russia) Nina Vislova (Russia) Olga Kozlova	13–15, 15–7, 17-16	Silver

=== BWF International Challenge/Series ===
Women's Doubles
Year	Tournament	Partner	Opponent	Score	Result
2012	French International	(Denmark) Louise Hansen	(Germany) Johanna Goliszewski (Netherlands) Judith Meulendijks	13-21, 12–21	(silver) Runner-up

BWF International Challenge tournament
BWF International Series tournament
BWF Future Series tournament
