= Anders Kristiansen (badminton) =

Danish badminton player (born 1979)

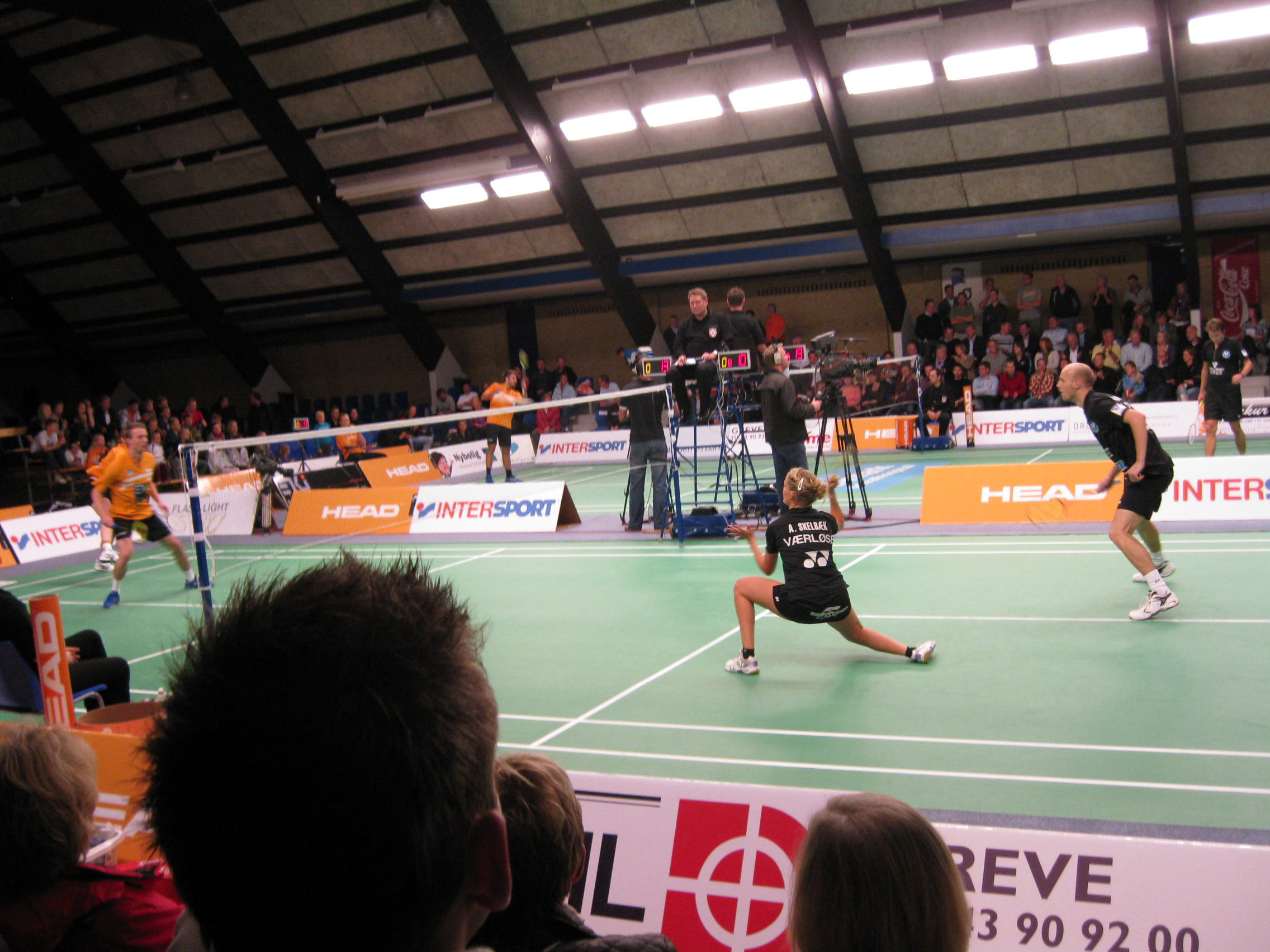

Personal information
- Born: 7 September 1979 (age 47) Frederikssund, Denmark

Sport
- Country: Denmark
- Sport: Badminton

Men's & mixed doubles
- Highest ranking: 20 (MD 26 August 2010); 11 (XD 23 May 2010)
- BWF profile
Medal record
Men's badminton
Representing Denmark
Sudirman Cup
Bronze medal – third place	2013 Kuala Lumpur	Mixed team
European Championships
Bronze medal – third place	2010 Manchester	Men's doubles
Bronze medal – third place	2012 Karlskrona	Men's doubles
Bronze medal – third place	2014 Kazan	Mixed doubles
European Men's Team Championships
Gold medal – first place	2010 Warsaw	Men's team
Gold medal – first place	2012 Amsterdam	Men's team
Gold medal – first place	2014 Basel	Men's team

Anders Kristiansen (born 7 September 1979) is a Danish badminton player. He won the bronze medals at the European Championships in the men's doubles in 2010 and 2012; and also in the mixed doubles in 2014. Kristiansen was also part of Danish winning team at the European Men's Team Championships in 2010, 2012, and 2014.

== Achievements ==
=== European Championships ===
Men's doubles
Year	Venue	Partner	Opponent	Score	Result
2010	Manchester Evening News Arena; Manchester, England	(Denmark) Kasper Henriksen	(Denmark) Mathias Boe (Denmark) Carsten Mogensen	10–21, 15–21	Bronze
2012	Telenor Arena; Karlskrona, Sweden	(Denmark) Rasmus Bonde	(Germany) Michael Fuchs (Germany) Oliver Roth	18–21, 21–17, 14–21	Bronze

Mixed doubles
Year	Venue	Partner	Opponent	Score	Result
2014	Gymnastics Center; Kazan, Russia	(Denmark) Julie Houmann	(Denmark) Mads Pieler Kolding (Denmark) Kamilla Rytter Juhl	14–21, 17–21	Bronze

=== BWF Grand Prix ===
The BWF Grand Prix had two levels, the Grand Prix and Grand Prix Gold. It was a series of badminton tournaments sanctioned by the Badminton World Federation (BWF) and played between 2007 and 2017.

Mixed doubles
Year	Tournament	Partner	Opponent	Score	Result
2012	Bitburger Open	(Denmark) Julie Houmann	(Poland) Robert Mateusiak (Poland) Nadieżda Zięba	21–11, 21–16	(gold) Winner
2013	German Open	(Denmark) Julie Houmann	(South Korea) Shin Baek-cheol (South Korea) Jang Ye-na	19–21, 21–19, 22–24	(silver) Runner-up

BWF Grand Prix Gold tournament
BWF Grand Prix tournament

=== BWF International Challenge/Series ===
Men's doubles
Year	Tournament	Partner	Opponent	Score	Result
2005	Croatian International	(Denmark) Simon Mollyhus	(France) Erwin Kehlhoffner (France) Thomas Quéré	15–10, 6–15, 15–6	(gold) Winner
2005	French Open	(Denmark) Simon Mollyhus	(England) Chris Langridge (England) Chris Tonks	15–13, 15–12	(gold) Winner
2005	Southern PanAm International	(Denmark) Simon Mollyhus	(Japan) Tōru Matsumoto (Japan) Keishi Kawaguchi	15–2, 9–15, 15–5	(gold) Winner
2005	Czech International	(Denmark) Simon Mollyhus	(England) Chris Langridge (England) Chris Tonks	6–15, 11–15	(silver) Runner-up
2005	Iceland International	(Denmark) Simon Mollyhus	(Austria) Jürgen Koch (Austria) Peter Zauner	15–13, 15–6	(gold) Winner
2005	Italian International	(Denmark) Simon Mollyhus	(England) Simon Archer (England) David Lindley	15–10, 9–15, 15–13	(gold) Winner
2006	Portugal International	(Denmark) Simon Mollyhus	(Denmark) Rasmus Bonde (Denmark) Kasper Henriksen	16–21, 21–15, 21–18	(gold) Winner
2006	Spanish International	(Denmark) Simon Mollyhus	(Wales) Matthew Hughes (Wales) Martyn Lewis	18–21, 20–22	(silver) Runner-up
2009	Bulgarian International	(Denmark) Kasper Henriksen	(Russia) Vladimir Ivanov (Russia) Ivan Sozonov	21–11, 21–11	(gold) Winner
2011	Denmark International	(Denmark) Rasmus Bonde	(Denmark) Mikkel Elbjørn Larsen (Denmark) Christian John Skovgaard	21–14, 19–21, 21–16	(gold) Winner
2011	Norwegian International	(Denmark) Rasmus Bonde	(Poland) Adam Cwalina (Poland) Michał Łogosz	21–17, 21–18	(gold) Winner

BWF International Challenge tournament
BWF International Series tournament
