= Heather Olver =

English badminton player (born 1986)

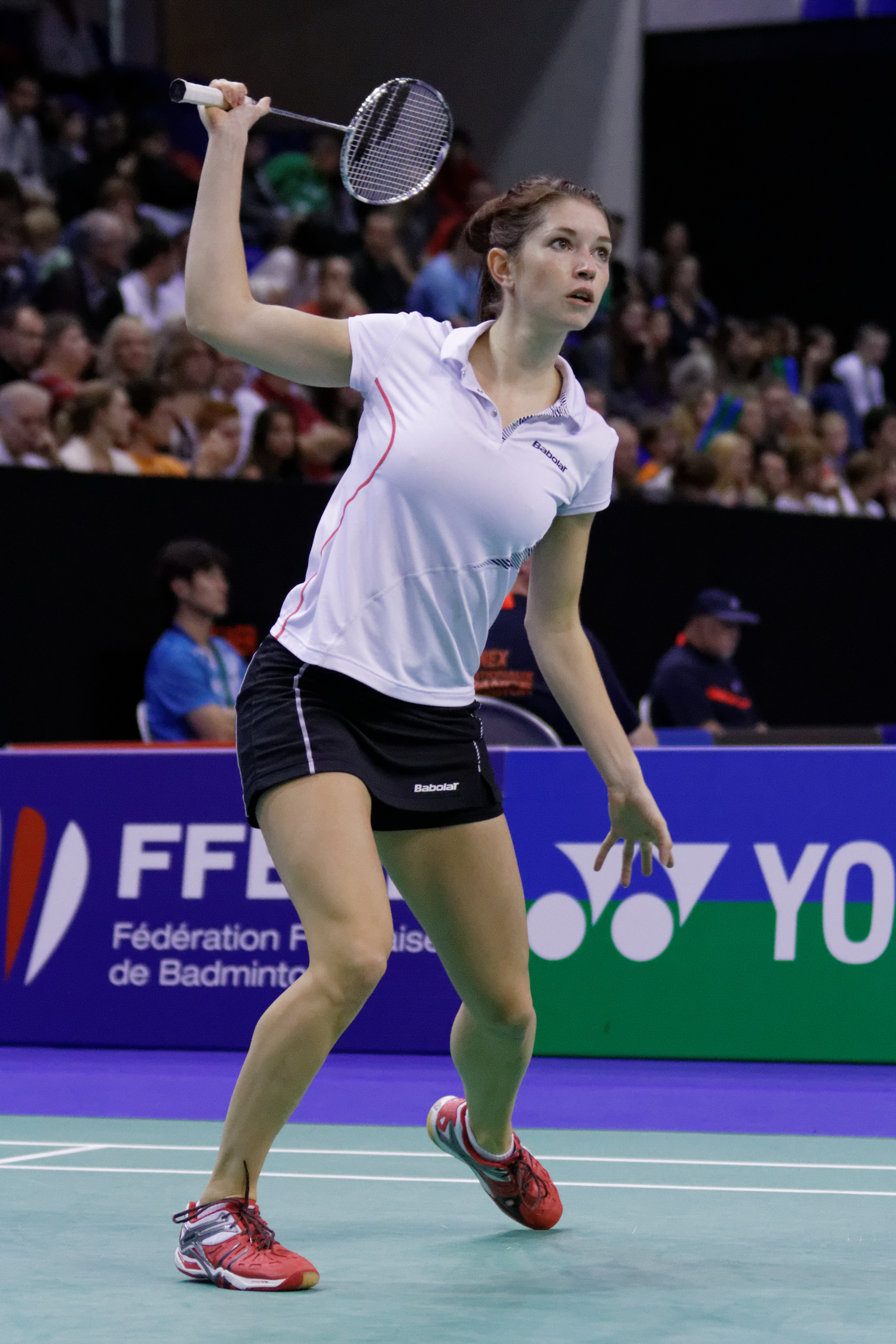
- Heather Olver at the 2013 French Super Series

Personal information
- Born: 15 March 1986 (age 40) Eastbourne, East Sussex, England
- Height: 1.70 m (5 ft 7 in)

Sport
- Country: England
- Sport: Badminton
- Handedness: Right
- Coached by: Julian Robertson

Women's & mixed doubles
- Highest ranking: 18 (WD) 10 March 2011; 15 (XD) 13 March 2014
- BWF profile
Medal record
Women's Badminton
Representing England
Commonwealth Games
Silver medal – second place	2014 Glasgow	Mixed doubles
Silver medal – second place	2014 Glasgow	Mixed team
Bronze medal – third place	2010 Delhi	Mixed team
European Championships
Bronze medal – third place	2010 Manchester	Women's doubles
European Mixed Team Championships
Silver medal – second place	2015 Leuven	Mixed team
Bronze medal – third place	2013 Moscow	Mixed team
Commonwealth Youth Games
Bronze medal – third place	2004 Bendigo	Mixed team

Heather Olver (born 15 March 1986) is an English badminton player. Her career highlights so far include mixed team and mixed doubles silver at the 2014 Commonwealth Games, European women’s doubles bronze, and reaching the final of the 2013 London Grand Prix Gold and Scottish Open. She also competed at the 2016 Rio Summer Olympics.

== Early career ==
She started playing at the age of six and started when she joined her local club, Waldron Junior BC, with her brother.

== Career ==
In 2005, Olver won the women's doubles at both the England Junior Championships and the Welsh International. In 2009, she was successful four times internationally, and in the following year she won the bronze medal at the European Championships in women's doubles.

She competed in the mixed team and mixed doubles event at the 2014 Commonwealth Games where she won silver medals respectively. She also won mixed team bronze in 2010.

== Education ==
Having attended primary school at Cross in Hand CEP, she later went on to obtain a degree in Coach Education and Sports Development from the University of Bath. She was both a triple jumper and a 200m sprinter at Heathfield Community College in East Sussex.

== Achievements ==
=== Commonwealth Games ===
Mixed Doubles
Year	Venue	Partner	Opponent	Score	Result
2014	Emirates Arena; Glasgow, Scotland	(England) Chris Langridge	(England) Chris Adcock (England) Gabby Adcock	9–21, 12–21	Silver

=== European Championships ===
Women's Doubles
Year	Venue	Partner	Opponent	Score	Result
2010	Manchester Evening News Arena; Manchester, England	(England) Mariana Agathangelou	(Bulgaria) Petya Nedelcheva (Russia) Anastasia Russkikh	18–21, 13–21	Bronze

=== BWF Grand Prix ===
The BWF Grand Prix has two level such as Grand Prix and Grand Prix Gold. It is a series of badminton tournaments, sanctioned by Badminton World Federation (BWF) since 2007.

Women's Doubles
Year	Tournament	Partner	Opponent	Score	Result
2016	Canada Open	(England) Lauren Smith	(Australia) Setyana Mapasa (Australia) Gronya Somerville	15–21, 16–21	(silver) Runner-up
2014	Scottish Open	(England) Lauren Smith	(Bulgaria) Gabriela Stoeva (Bulgaria) Stefani Stoeva	7–21, 15–21	(silver) Runner-up

Mixed Doubles
Year	Tournament	Partner	Opponent	Score	Result
2013	Scottish Open	(England) Chris Langridge	(Scotland) Robert Blair (Scotland) Imogen Bankier	16–21, 14–21	(silver) Runner-up
2013	London Grand Prix Gold	(England) Chris Langridge	(Germany) Michael Fuchs (Germany) Birgit Michels	19–21, 14–21	(silver) Runner-up

BWF Grand Prix Gold tournament
BWF Grand Prix tournament

=== BWF International Challenge/Series ===
Women's doubles
Year	Tournament	Partner	Opponent	Score	Result
2016	Peru International	(England) Lauren Smith	(Germany) Johanna Goliszewski (Germany) Carla Nelte	18–21, 21–19, 19–21	(silver) Runner-up
2016	Orleans International	(England) Lauren Smith	(France) Delphine Delrue (France) Lea Palermo	21–19, 21–8	(gold) Winner
2015	USA International	(England) Lauren Smith	(Thailand) Puttita Supajirakul (Thailand) Sapsiree Taerattanachai	18–21, 21–19, 21–19	(gold) Winner
2015	Welsh International	(England) Lauren Smith	(Bulgaria) Gabriela Stoeva (Bulgaria) Stefani Stoeva	10–21, 20–22	(silver) Runner-up
2015	Kharkiv International	(England) Lauren Smith	(Thailand) Jongkongphan Kittiharakul (Thailand) Rawinda Prajongjai	18–21, 15–21	(silver) Runner-up
2015	Finnish Open	(England) Lauren Smith	(France) Delphine Lansac (France) Emilie Lefel	21–13, 23–21	(gold) Winner
2015	Orleans International	(England) Lauren Smith	(Bulgaria) Gabriela Stoeva (Bulgaria) Stefani Stoeva	20–22, 21–16, 9–21	(silver) Runner-up
2015	Austrian International	(England) Lauren Smith	(Indonesia) Suci Rizky Andini (Indonesia) Maretha Dea Giovani	14–21, 21–23	(silver) Runner-up
2014	Welsh International	(England) Lauren Smith	(England) Sophie Brown (England) Kate Robertshaw	21–11, 21–17	(gold) Winner
2013	Spanish Open	(England) Kate Robertshaw	(Denmark) Maiken Fruergaard (Denmark) Sara Thygesen	18–21, 21–13, 22–20	(gold) Winner
2012	Swiss International	(England) Kate Robertshaw	(Germany) Isabel Herttrich (Germany) Carla Nelte	21–15, 15–21, 23–21	(gold) Winner
2012	Czech International	(England) Kate Robertshaw	(Scotland) Jillie Cooper (Scotland) Kirsty Gilmour	21–16, 21–15	(gold) Winner
2012	Polish Open	(England) Mariana Agathangelou	(United States) Eva Lee (United States) Paula Lynn Obanana	21–12, 23–21	(gold) Winner
2012	Swedish Masters	(England) Mariana Agathangelou	(United States) Eva Lee (United States) Paula Lynn Obanana	21–15, 21–12	(gold) Winner
2011	Irish International	(England) Mariana Agathangelou	(Malaysia) Ng Hui Ern (Malaysia) Ng Hui Lin	21–14, 16–21, 11–21	(silver) Runner-up
2011	Bulgarian International	(England) Mariana Agathangelou	(India) Pradnya Gadre (India) Prajakta Sawant	18–21, 21–7, 21–10	(gold) Winner
2011	Belgian International	(England) Mariana Agathangelou	(Singapore) Shinta Mulia Sari (Singapore) Yao Lei	12–21, 18–21	(silver) Runner-up
2010	Irish International	(England) Mariana Agathangelou	(Denmark) Maria Helsbol (Denmark) Anne Skelbaek	21–12, 12–21, 15–21	(silver) Runner-up
2010	Scottish International	(England) Mariana Agathangelou	(England) Jenny Wallwork (England) Gabrielle White	17–21, 17–21	(silver) Runner-up
2009	Irish International	(England) Mariana Agathangelou	(Denmark) Maria Helsbol (Denmark) Anne Skelbaek	21–13, 21–19	(gold) Winner
2005	Welsh International	(England) Hayley Connor	(England) Mariana Agathangelou (England) Rachel Howard	6–15, 17–16, 15–4	(gold) Winner

Mixed doubles
Year	Tournament	Partner	Opponent	Score	Result
2013	Welsh International	(England) Chris Langridge	(Russia) Vitalij Durkin (Russia) Nina Vislova	21–17, 10–21, 21–13	(gold) Winner
2012	Welsh International	(England) Chris Langridge	(England) Marcus Ellis (England) Gabrielle White	20–22, 16–21	(silver) Runner-up
2012	Czech International	(England) Chris Langridge	(England) Marcus Ellis (England) Gabrielle White	22–20, 6–7 Retired	(gold) Winner
2012	Belgian International	(England) Chris Langridge	(England) Marcus Ellis (England) Gabrielle White	21–9, 10–21, 17–21	(silver) Runner-up
2011	Irish International	(England) Marcus Ellis	(Netherlands) Dave Khodabux (Netherlands) Selena Piek	21–19, 21–17	(gold) Winner
2011	Swedish Masters	(England) Robin Middleton	(Netherlands) Dave Khodabux (Netherlands) Samantha Barning	15–21, 21–9, 21–14	(gold) Winner
2009	Norwegian International	(England) Marcus Ellis	(England) Robin Middleton (England) Mariana Agathangelou	21–19, 21–17	(gold) Winner
2009	Belgian International	(England) Marcus Ellis	(Belgium) Wouter Claes (Belgium) Nathalie Descamps	21–9, 25–23	(gold) Winner
2009	Austrian International	(England) Robert Adcock	(Ukraine) Valeriy Atrashchenkov (Ukraine) Elena Prus	21–17, 21–18	(gold) Winner
2009	Swedish International	(England) Robert Adcock	(Ukraine) Valeriy Atrashchenkov (Ukraine) Elena Prus	16–21, 11–21	(silver) Runner-up
2008	Scottish International	(England) Robert Adcock	(Germany) Michael Fuchs (Germany) Annekatrin Lillie	16–21, 12–21	(silver) Runner-up
2006	Slovak International	(England) Matthew Honey	(England) David Lindley (England) Suzanne Rayappan	12–21, 19–21	(silver) Runner-up

BWF International Challenge tournament
BWF International Series tournament
