= Sébastien Vincent =

French badminton player (born 1982)

Personal information
- Born: 4 October 1982 (age 44)

Sport
- Country: France
- Sport: Badminton

Men's & mixed doubles
- Highest ranking: 37 (MD 3 February 2011); 99 (XD 26 November 2009)
- BWF profile

Sébastien Vincent (born 4 October 1982) is a French badminton player affiliated with B.C. Chambly Oise. In 2009, he won French National Badminton Championships in men's doubles event with his partner Svetoslav Stoyanov.

== Achievements ==
=== BWF International Challenge/Series ===
Men's doubles
Year	Tournament	Partner	Opponent	Score	Result
2009	Portugal International	(France) Laurent Constantin	(Spain) Ruben Gordown Khosadalina (Spain) Stenny Kusuma	12–21, 11–21	(silver) Runner-up
2009	Cyprus International	(France) Laurent Constantin	(Denmark) Christopher Bruun Jensen (Denmark) Morten Kronborg	16–21, 21–8, 17–21	(silver) Runner-up
2010	Finnish International	(France) Laurent Constantin	(Russia) Andrei Ivanov (Russia) Andrey Ashmarin	21–12, 21–18	(gold) Winner
2012	Estonian International	(France) Laurent Constantin	(Netherlands) Jorrit de Ruiter (Netherlands) Dave Khodabux	21–17, 19–21, 21–15	(gold) Winner
2012	Banuinvest International	(France) Laurent Constantin	(Indonesia) Arya Maulana Aldiartama (Indonesia) Edi Subaktiar	21–18, 20–22, 21–17	(gold) Winner
2013	Romanian International	(France) Quentin Vincent	(Japan) Takuto Inoue (Japan) Yuki Kaneko	10–21, 10–21	(silver) Runner-up

BWF International Challenge tournament
BWF International Series tournament
BWF Future Series tournament
