= Christinna Pedersen =

Danish badminton player (born 1986)

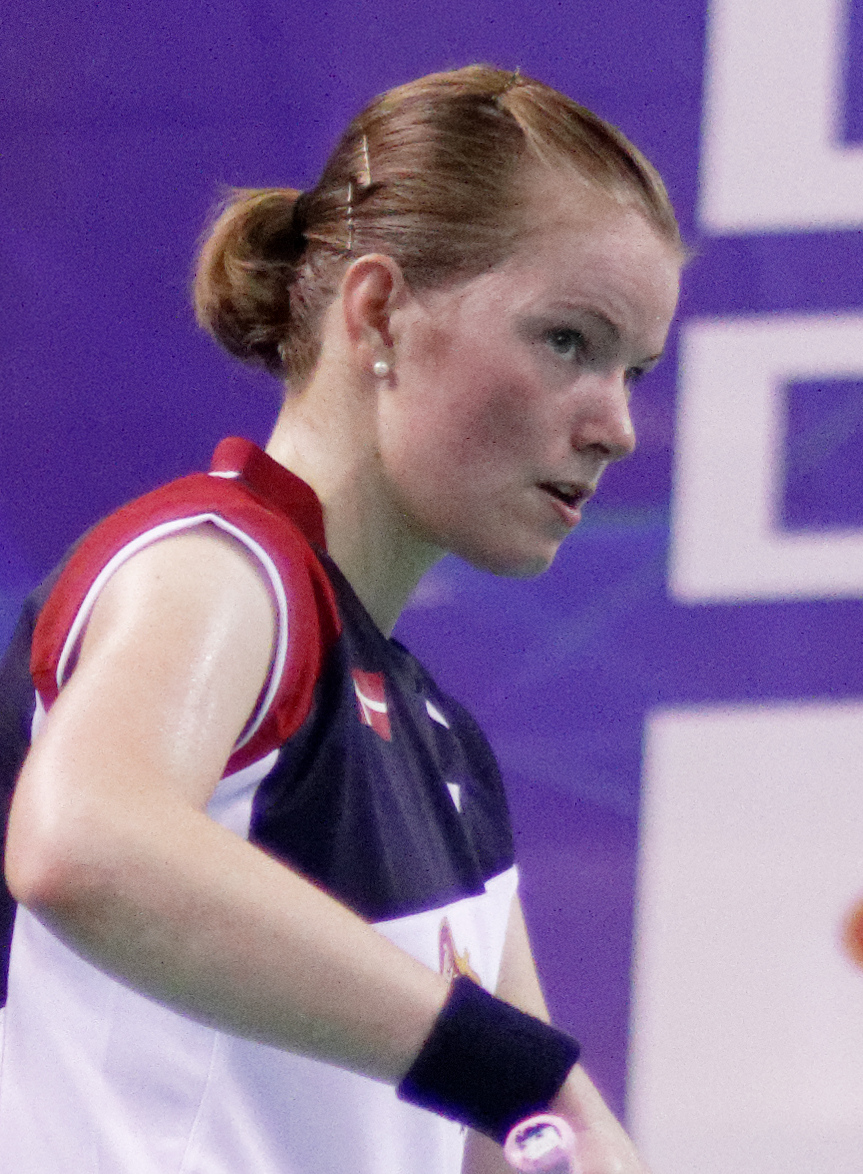
- Pedersen at the 2013 French Super Series

Personal information
- Born: 12 May 1986 (age 40) Aalborg, Denmark
- Height: 1.78 m (5 ft 10 in)
- Spouse: Kamilla Rytter Juhl

Sport
- Country: Denmark
- Sport: Badminton
- Handedness: Right
- Retired: 11 March 2019

Women's & mixed doubles
- Highest ranking: 2 (WD with Kamilla Rytter Juhl 10 May 2018); 1 (XD with Joachim Fischer Nielsen 2 April 2015)
- BWF profile
Medal record
Women's badminton
Representing Denmark
Olympic Games
| Silver medal – second place | 2016 Rio de Janeiro | Women's doubles |
| Bronze medal – third place | 2012 London | Mixed doubles |
World Championships
| Silver medal – second place | 2015 Jakarta | Women's doubles |
| Bronze medal – third place | 2009 Hyderabad | Mixed doubles |
| Bronze medal – third place | 2013 Guangzhou | Women's doubles |
| Bronze medal – third place | 2014 Copenhagen | Mixed doubles |
| Bronze medal – third place | 2017 Glasgow | Women's doubles |
Sudirman Cup
| Silver medal – second place | 2011 Qingdao | Mixed team |
| Bronze medal – third place | 2013 Kuala Lumpur | Mixed team |
European Championships
| Gold medal – first place | 2012 Karlskrona | Women's doubles |
| Gold medal – first place | 2014 Kazan | Women's doubles |
| Gold medal – first place | 2014 Kazan | Mixed doubles |
| Gold medal – first place | 2016 La Roche-sur-Yon | Women's doubles |
| Gold medal – first place | 2016 La Roche-sur-Yon | Mixed doubles |
| Gold medal – first place | 2017 Kolding | Women's doubles |
| Silver medal – second place | 2017 Kolding | Mixed doubles |
| Silver medal – second place | 2018 Huelva | Mixed doubles |
European Mixed Team Championships
| Gold medal – first place | 2015 Leuven | Mixed team |
| Gold medal – first place | 2017 Lubin | Mixed team |
| Gold medal – first place | 2019 Copenhagen | Mixed team |
| Silver medal – second place | 2013 Moscow | Mixed team |
European Women's Team Championships
| Gold medal – first place | 2008 Almere | Women's team |
| Gold medal – first place | 2010 Warsaw | Women's team |
| Gold medal – first place | 2014 Basel | Women's team |
| Gold medal – first place | 2016 Kazan | Women's team |
| Gold medal – first place | 2018 Kazan | Women's team |
| Silver medal – second place | 2012 Amsterdam | Women's team |
European Junior Championships
| Gold medal – first place | 2005 Den Bosch | Mixed doubles |
| Gold medal – first place | 2005 Den Bosch | Mixed team |
| Silver medal – second place | 2005 Den Bosch | Girls' doubles |

Christinna Pedersen (born 12 May 1986) is a Danish badminton player. Known for her smart play, defensive skills, consistency, and cooperation with her partners, she represented Denmark for many years at the highest level of international badminton and became a notable figure in both European and World competitions. Throughout her career, she became one of the few players to achieve world-class status in two different categories simultaneously, reaching a career-high ranking of world number 1 in the mixed doubles and number 2 in the women's doubles. Pedersen officially announced her retirement from international competition in March 2019, leaving behind a legacy as one of Europe's most successful badminton athletes.

Pedersen formed long-standing partnership with Kamilla Rytter Juhl. Together, they achieved historic milestones, the most notable was winning the silver medal at the 2016 Rio Olympics, which made them the first European pair to reach an Olympic women's doubles final. Their dominance was also evident in Europe, where they secured four consecutive European Championships titles. Additionally, they were regular contenders on the global stage, winning the season ending-finale in 2013 and earning multiple medals at the BWF World Championships, including a silver in 2015 and two bronze medals in 2013 and 2017.

Pedersen's career in the mixed doubles was equally spectacular, primarily through her partnership with Joachim Fischer Nielsen. The duo was a powerhouse on the BWF Superseries circuit, capturing ten titles and winning the World Superseries Finals three times. Their greatest achievement together was winning the bronze medal at the 2012 London Olympics, a feat that solidified Pedersen's reputation as a big-match player. She also claimed two European mixed doubles titles and two bronze medals at the World Championships with Fischer Nielsen in 2009 nad 2014, eventually reaching the pinnacle of the BWF World Rankings as the number one mixed doubles pair in the world.

In recognition of Pedersen impact on badminton, she was honored at the Badminton Europe Gala with induction into the BEC Hall of Fame in 2023, and Badminton Denmark Player of the Year in 2011 with Fischer Nielsen and again in 2013 with Rytter Juhl. Beyond her achievements on the court, Pedersen is also known for her longstanding personal and professional partnership with Rytter Juhl, with whom she publicly came out as a lesbian couple after many years and later married in 2020. Pedersen has transitioned into a performance coach for Badminton England since 2025.

== Early life ==
Born on 12 May 1986, in Aalborg, Pedersen lived in her hometown until 2006, where her childhood was deeply connected to the local sports community. She began playing badminton at the age of six, a path she chose because her parents were already active players in the sport. Her early development took place at the Gug Badminton Klub, where she is remembered for having her "badminton upbringing" before moving to Copenhagen to join the national training center. During her teenage years, she achieved significant national recognition by winning the Danish U-15 girls' doubles title in the 2000/2001 season.

== Career ==
=== Junior career ===
Pedersen emerged as a rising star in Danish badminton by dominating the junior circuit before transitioning to senior competition. In 2005, she achieved a major breakthrough by winning the gold medal in the team and mixed doubles and a silver medal in the girls' doubles at the European Junior Championship. Her talent was further recognized at the club level, where she helped her team, Vendsyssel Elite Badminton (VEB), win the promotion play-offs to enter the top-tier Badmintonligaen for the 2005–2006 season. By 2006, her performance on the international stage continued to ascend, as she secured a second-place finish in mixed doubles at the Portugal International. This successful transition was formalized when she officially became a member of the Danish national team in 2006, marking the start of her elite professional career.

From 2008 onwards, Pedersen paired with Joachim Fischer Nielsen in mixed doubles. The pair gained two European mixed doubles titles, won bronze at the 2009 Hyderabad World Championships and at the 2014 World Championships, and came third at the 2012 Summer Olympics. Pedersen and Fischer Nielsen also produced strong results on the BWF Super Series circuit, winning a total of three World Superseries Finals and ten Superseries titles, and reaching a career high World Ranking of number 1.

Viewed by Badminton Denmark as a medal contender for the 2020 Olympics, Pedersen will compete in the mixed doubles with Mathias Christiansen as of the end of the 2016/17 season, after Joachim Fischer Nielsen broke his left ankle at the BWF World Championships 2017 in Glasgow.

In women's doubles, Pedersen has paired with Kamilla Rytter Juhl from 2010 to 2018. Initially, the two athletes also focussed on competing with their respective partners in mixed doubles, however, as of 2015, Juhl has competed exclusively in the women's doubles. The pair won a silver medal at the 2015 World Championships, and a bronze medal at the 2013 Guangzhou World Championship and at the 2017 BWF World Championships. Pedersen and Rytter Juhl have won a total of four European women's doubles titles, one World Superseries Final and five Superseries titles, and have a career highest World Ranking of number 2. The pair won a silver medal at the 2016 Rio Olympics and, in doing so, became the first Europeans to ever compete in an Olympic women's doubles final. This was also her second olympic medal.

Pedersen currently represents Skovshoved in the Danish Badminton League and lives in Copenhagen, where she trains with the national team. Off the badminton court, Pedersen is a qualified maths, history and food technology teacher.

Pedersen announced her retirement in March 2019 together with Rytter Juhl. The duo journey in badminton will continue in the national tournament.

== Personal life ==
Pedersen and Kamilla Rytter Juhl have been together since 2009. Juhl gave birth to daughter Molly in January 2019.

Pedersen and Rytter Juhl's autobiography, "Det Unikke Makkerskab" (loosely translated: The unique partnership), written with support from journalist Rasmus M. Bech, was released in Denmark in October 2017.

== Achievements ==
=== Olympic Games ===
Women's doubles
| Year | Venue | Partner | Opponent | Score | Result |
|---|---|---|---|---|---|
| 2016 | Riocentro - Pavilion 4, Rio de Janeiro, Brazil | (Denmark) Kamilla Rytter Juhl | (Japan) Misaki Matsutomo (Japan) Ayaka Takahashi | 21–18, 9–21, 19–21 | Silver |

Mixed doubles
| Year | Venue | Partner | Opponent | Score | Result |
|---|---|---|---|---|---|
| 2012 | Wembley Arena, London, Great Britain | (Denmark) Joachim Fischer Nielsen | (Indonesia) Tontowi Ahmad (Indonesia) Liliyana Natsir | 21–12, 21–12 | Bronze |

=== BWF World Championships ===
Women's doubles
| Year | Venue | Partner | Opponent | Score | Result |
|---|---|---|---|---|---|
| 2013 | Tianhe Sports Center, Guangzhou, China | (Denmark) Kamilla Rytter Juhl | (China) Wang Xiaoli (China) Yu Yang | 14–21, 21–14, 15–21 | Bronze |
| 2015 | Istora Senayan, Jakarta, Indonesia | (Denmark) Kamilla Rytter Juhl | (China) Tian Qing (China) Zhao Yunlei | 25–23, 8–21, 15–21 | Silver |
| 2017 | Emirates Arena, Glasgow, Scotland | (Denmark) Kamilla Rytter Juhl | (Japan) Yuki Fukushima (Japan) Sayaka Hirota | 17–21, 21–19, 14–21 | Bronze |

Mixed doubles
| Year | Venue | Partner | Opponent | Score | Result |
|---|---|---|---|---|---|
| 2009 | Gachibowli Indoor Stadium, Hyderabad, India | (Denmark) Joachim Fischer Nielsen | (Indonesia) Nova Widianto (Indonesia) Liliyana Natsir | 18–21, 21–14, 18–21 | Bronze |
| 2014 | Ballerup Super Arena, Copenhagen, Denmark | (Denmark) Joachim Fischer Nielsen | (China) Xu Chen (China) Ma Jin | 15–21, 9–21 | Bronze |

=== European Championships ===
Women's doubles
| Year | Venue | Partner | Opponent | Score | Result |
|---|---|---|---|---|---|
| 2012 | Telenor Arena, Karlskrona, Sweden | (Denmark) Kamilla Rytter Juhl | (Denmark) Line Damkjær Kruse (Denmark) Marie Røpke | 22–20, 13–21, 21–12 | Gold |
| 2014 | Gymnastics Center, Kazan, Russia | (Denmark) Kamilla Rytter Juhl | (Denmark) Line Damkjær Kruse (Denmark) Marie Røpke | 21–11, 21–11 | Gold |
| 2016 | Vendéspace, La Roche-sur-Yon, France | (Denmark) Kamilla Rytter Juhl | (Netherlands) Eefje Muskens (Netherlands) Selena Piek | 21–18, 21–17 | Gold |
| 2017 | Sydbank Arena, Kolding, Denmark | (Denmark) Kamilla Rytter Juhl | (Bulgaria) Gabriela Stoeva (Bulgaria) Stefani Stoeva | 21–11, 15–21, 21–11 | Gold |

Mixed doubles
| Year | Venue | Partner | Opponent | Score | Result |
|---|---|---|---|---|---|
| 2014 | Gymnastics Center, Kazan, Russia | (Denmark) Joachim Fischer Nielsen | (Denmark) Mads Pieler Kolding (Denmark) Kamilla Rytter Juhl | 22–24, 21–13, 21–18 | Gold |
| 2016 | Vendéspace, La Roche-sur-Yon, France | (Denmark) Joachim Fischer Nielsen | (Denmark) Niclas Nøhr (Denmark) Sara Thygesen | 19–21, 21–13, 21–17 | Gold |
| 2017 | Sydbank Arena, Kolding, Denmark | (Denmark) Joachim Fischer Nielsen | (England) Chris Adcock (England) Gabby Adcock | 17–21, 21–18, 19–21 | Silver |
| 2018 | Palacio de los Deportes Carolina Marín, Huelva, Spain | (Denmark) Mathias Christiansen | (England) Chris Adcock (England) Gabby Adcock | 18–21, 21–17, 18–21 | Silver |

=== European Junior Championships ===
Girls' doubles
| Year | Venue | Partner | Opponent | Score | Result |
|---|---|---|---|---|---|
| 2005 | De Maaspoort, Den Bosch, Netherlands | (Denmark) Tine Kruse | (Russia) Olga Kozlova (Russia) Nina Vislova | 15–13, 7–15, 16–17 | Silver |

Mixed doubles
| Year | Venue | Partner | Opponent | Score | Result |
|---|---|---|---|---|---|
| 2005 | De Maaspoort, Den Bosch, Netherlands | (Denmark) Rasmus Bonde | (England) Robert Adcock (England) Jennifer Wallwork | 15–8, 15–5 | Gold |

=== BWF World Tour ===
The BWF World Tour, which was announced on 19 March 2017 and implemented in 2018, is a series of elite badminton tournaments sanctioned by the Badminton World Federation (BWF). The BWF World Tour is divided into levels of World Tour Finals, Super 1000, Super 750, Super 500, Super 300 (part of the HSBC World Tour), and the BWF Tour Super 100.

Women's doubles
| Year | Tournament | Level | Partner | Opponent | Score | Result |
|---|---|---|---|---|---|---|
| 2018 | Malaysia Masters | Super 500 | (Denmark) Kamilla Rytter Juhl | (China) Chen Qingchen (China) Jia Yifan | 22–20, 21–18 | (gold) Winner |
| 2018 | All England Open | Super 1000 | (Denmark) Kamilla Rytter Juhl | (Japan) Yuki Fukushima (Japan) Sayaka Hirota | 21–19, 21–18 | (gold) Winner |

Mixed doubles
| Year | Tournament | Level | Partner | Opponent | Score | Result |
|---|---|---|---|---|---|---|
| 2018 | India Open | Super 500 | (Denmark) Mathias Christiansen | (Indonesia) Praveen Jordan (Indonesia) Melati Daeva Oktavianti | 21–14, 21–15 | (gold) Winner |
| 2018 | Korea Open | Super 500 | (Denmark) Mathias Christiansen | (China) He Jiting (China) Du Yue | 18–21, 16–21 | (silver) Runner-up |

=== BWF Superseries ===
The BWF Superseries, which was launched on 14 December 2006 and implemented in 2007, was a series of elite badminton tournaments, sanctioned by the Badminton World Federation (BWF). BWF Superseries levels were Superseries and Superseries Premier. A season of Superseries consisted of twelve tournaments around the world that had been introduced since 2011. Successful players were invited to the Superseries Finals, which were held at the end of each year.

Women's doubles
| Year | Tournament | Partner | Opponent | Score | Result |
|---|---|---|---|---|---|
| 2012 | Malaysia Open | (Denmark) Kamilla Rytter Juhl | (South Korea) Ha Jung-eun (South Korea) Kim Min-jung | 21–19, 21–18 | (gold) Winner |
| 2012 | French Open | (Denmark) Kamilla Rytter Juhl | (China) Ma Jin (China) Tang Jinhua | 12–21, 21–23 | (silver) Runner-up |
| 2012 | World Superseries Finals | (Denmark) Kamilla Rytter Juhl | (China) Wang Xiaoli (China) Yu Yang | 16–21, 14–21 | (silver) Runner-up |
| 2013 | India Open | (Denmark) Kamilla Rytter Juhl | (Japan) Miyuki Maeda (Japan) Satoko Suetsuna | 21–12, 21–23, 18–21 | (silver) Runner-up |
| 2013 | Japan Open | (Denmark) Kamilla Rytter Juhl | (China) Ma Jin (China) Tang Jinhua | 11–21, 14–21 | (silver) Runner-up |
| 2013 | Denmark Open | (Denmark) Kamilla Rytter Juhl | (China) Bao Yixin (China) Tang Jinhua | 16–21, 13–21 | (silver) Runner-up |
| 2013 | World Superseries Finals | (Denmark) Kamilla Rytter Juhl | (China) Ma Jin (China) Tang Jinhua | 21–19, 21–12 | (gold) Winner |
| 2014 | Singapore Open | (Denmark) Kamilla Rytter Juhl | (China) Bao Yixin (China) Tang Jinhua | 21–14, 19–21, 15–21 | (silver) Runner-up |
| 2015 | Japan Open | (Denmark) Kamilla Rytter Juhl | (China) Zhao Yunlei (China) Zhong Qianxin | 12–21, 16–21 | (silver) Runner-up |
| 2015 | Dubai World Superseries Finals | (Denmark) Kamilla Rytter Juhl | (China) Luo Ying (China) Luo Yu | 21–14, 9–21, 4–14 retired | (silver) Runner-up |
| 2016 | Japan Open | (Denmark) Kamilla Rytter Juhl | (Japan) Misaki Matsutomo (Japan) Ayaka Takahashi | 19–21, 21–18, 21–12 | (gold) Winner |
| 2016 | Hong Kong Open | (Denmark) Kamilla Rytter Juhl | (China) Huang Dongping (China) Li Yinhui | 21–19, 21–10 | (gold) Winner |
| 2017 | All England Open | (Denmark) Kamilla Rytter Juhl | (South Korea) Chang Ye-na (South Korea) Lee So-hee | 18–21, 13–21 | (silver) Runner-up |
| 2017 | Singapore Open | (Denmark) Kamilla Rytter Juhl | (Japan) Misaki Matsutomo (Japan) Ayaka Takahashi | 21–18, 14–21, 21–15 | (gold) Winner |
| 2017 | Australian Open | (Denmark) Kamilla Rytter Juhl | (Japan) Misaki Matsutomo (Japan) Ayaka Takahashi | 10–21, 13–21 | (silver) Runner-up |

Mixed doubles
| Year | Tournament | Partner | Opponent | Score | Result |
|---|---|---|---|---|---|
| 2008 | Denmark Open | (Denmark) Joachim Fischer Nielsen | (Denmark) Thomas Laybourn (Denmark) Kamilla Rytter Juhl | 21–14, 21–17 | (gold) Winner |
| 2009 | Japan Open | (Denmark) Joachim Fischer Nielsen | (Thailand) Songphon Anugritayawon (Thailand) Kunchala Voravichitchaikul | 21–13, 16–21, 20–22 | (silver) Runner-up |
| 2009 | Denmark Open | (Denmark) Joachim Fischer Nielsen | (England) Anthony Clark (England) Donna Kellogg | 21–16, 25–27, 21–17 | (gold) Winner |
| 2009 | World Superseries Finals | (Denmark) Joachim Fischer Nielsen | (India) Valiyaveetil Diju (India) Jwala Gutta | 21–14, 21–18 | (gold) Winner |
| 2010 | Hong Kong Open | (Denmark) Joachim Fischer Nielsen | (China) Zhang Nan (China) Zhao Yunlei | 22–20, 14–21, 22–20 | (gold) Winner |
| 2011 | Japan Open | (Denmark) Joachim Fischer Nielsen | (Chinese Taipei) Chen Hung-ling (Chinese Taipei) Chen Wen-hsing | 19–21, 21–16, 15–21 | (silver) Runner-up |
| 2011 | Denmark Open | (Denmark) Joachim Fischer Nielsen | (China) Xu Chen (China) Ma Jin | 22–20, 21–16 | (gold) Winner |
| 2011 | French Open | (Denmark) Joachim Fischer Nielsen | (China) Xu Chen (China) Ma Jin | 21–17, 21–14 | (gold) Winner |
| 2011 | Hong Kong Open | (Denmark) Joachim Fischer Nielsen | (China) Zhang Nan (China) Zhao Yunlei | 21–15, 17–21, 17–21 | (silver) Runner-up |
| 2011 | China Open | (Denmark) Joachim Fischer Nielsen | (China) Zhang Nan (China) Zhao Yunlei | 11–21, 14–21 | (silver) Runner-up |
| 2012 | World Superseries Finals | (Denmark) Joachim Fischer Nielsen | (China) Zhang Nan (China) Zhao Yunlei | 17–21, 21–12, 21–14 | (gold) Winner |
| 2013 | Malaysia Open | (Denmark) Joachim Fischer Nielsen | (Malaysia) Chan Peng Soon (Malaysia) Goh Liu Ying | 21–13, 21–18 | (gold) Winner |
| 2013 | Indonesia Open | (Denmark) Joachim Fischer Nielsen | (China) Zhang Nan (China) Zhao Yunlei | 22–24, 22–20, 12–21 | (silver) Runner-up |
| 2013 | China Open | (Denmark) Joachim Fischer Nielsen | (Indonesia) Tontowi Ahmad (Indonesia) Liliyana Natsir | 10–21, 21–5, 17–21 | (silver) Runner-up |
| 2013 | World Superseries Finals | (Denmark) Joachim Fischer Nielsen | (China) Zhang Nan (China) Zhao Yunlei | 12–21, 21–19, 21–10 | (gold) Winner |
| 2014 | Malaysia Open | (Denmark) Joachim Fischer Nielsen | (China) Xu Chen (China) Ma Jin | 11–21, 21–17, 13–21 | (silver) Runner-up |
| 2014 | India Open | (Denmark) Joachim Fischer Nielsen | (South Korea) Ko Sung-hyun (South Korea) Kim Ha-na | 21–16, 18–21, 21–18 | (gold) Winner |
| 2014 | Indonesia Open | (Denmark) Joachim Fischer Nielsen | (China) Xu Chen (China) Ma Jin | 18–21, 21–16, 21–14 | (gold) Winner |
| 2015 | India Open | (Denmark) Joachim Fischer Nielsen | (China) Liu Cheng (China) Bao Yixin | 19–21, 19–21 | (silver) Runner-up |
| 2015 | Japan Open | (Denmark) Joachim Fischer Nielsen | (China) Zhang Nan (China) Zhao Yunlei | 17–21, 21–18, 23–21 | (gold) Winner |
| 2015 | China Open | (Denmark) Joachim Fischer Nielsen | (China) Zhang Nan (China) Zhao Yunlei | 19–21, 21–17, 19–21 | (silver) Runner-up |
| 2016 | All England Open | (Denmark) Joachim Fischer Nielsen | (Indonesia) Praveen Jordan (Indonesia) Debby Susanto | 12–21, 17–21 | (silver) Runner-up |
| 2016 | Denmark Open | (Denmark) Joachim Fischer Nielsen | (China) Zheng Siwei (China) Chen Qingchen | 21–16, 22–20 | (gold) Winner |
| 2017 | China Open | (Denmark) Mathias Christiansen | (China) Zheng Siwei (China) Huang Yaqiong | 15–21, 11–21 | (silver) Runner-up |
| 2017 | Hong Kong Open | (Denmark) Mathias Christiansen | (China) Zheng Siwei (China) Huang Yaqiong | 15–21, 13–21 | (silver) Runner-up |

BWF Super Series Finals tournament
BWF Super Series Premier tournament
BWF Super Series tournament

=== BWF Grand Prix ===
The BWF Grand Prix had two levels, the Grand Prix and Grand Prix Gold. It was a series of badminton tournaments sanctioned by the Badminton World Federation (BWF) and played between 2007 and 2017.

Women's doubles
| Year | Tournament | Partner | Opponent | Score | Result |
|---|---|---|---|---|---|
| 2013 | London Grand Prix Gold | (Denmark) Kamilla Rytter Juhl | (Denmark) Line Damkjær Kruse (Denmark) Marie Røpke | 12–21, 21–17, 21–15 | (gold) Winner |
| 2015 | Malaysia Masters | (Denmark) Kamilla Rytter Juhl | (Japan) Naoko Fukuman (Japan) Kurumi Yonao | 21–14, 21–14 | (gold) Winner |
| 2015 | German Open | (Denmark) Kamilla Rytter Juhl | (Indonesia) Della Destiara Haris (Indonesia) Rosyita Eka Putri Sari | 21–18, 17–21, 21–9 | (gold) Winner |
| 2017 | Syed Modi International | (Denmark) Kamilla Rytter Juhl | (India) Ashwini Ponnappa (India) N. Sikki Reddy | 21–16, 21–18 | (gold) Winner |

Mixed doubles
| Year | Tournament | Partner | Opponent | Score | Result |
|---|---|---|---|---|---|
| 2007 | Dutch Open | (Denmark) Rasmus Bonde Nissen | (Singapore) Hendri Saputra (Singapore) Li Yujia | 21–16, 21–14 | (gold) Winner |
| 2008 | Bitburger Open | (Denmark) Joachim Fischer Nielsen | (India) Valiyaveetil Diju (India) Jwala Gutta | 21–8, 17–21, 20–22 | (silver) Runner-up |
| 2008 | Dutch Open | (Denmark) Joachim Fischer Nielsen | (Indonesia) Fran Kurniawan (Indonesia) Shendy Puspa Irawati | 21–17, 21–9 | (gold) Winner |
| 2011 | Swiss Open | (Denmark) Joachim Fischer Nielsen | (England) Nathan Robertson (England) Jenny Wallwork | 23–21, 21–14 | (gold) Winner |
| 2013 | Swiss Open | (Denmark) Joachim Fischer Nielsen | (China) Zhang Nan (China) Tang Jinhua | 22–20, 21–19 | (gold) Winner |
| 2015 | Malaysia Masters | (Denmark) Joachim Fischer Nielsen | (Indonesia) Praveen Jordan (Indonesia) Debby Susanto | 21–18, 21–18 | (gold) Winner |
| 2015 | German Open | (Denmark) Joachim Fischer Nielsen | (Denmark) Mads Pieler Kolding (Denmark) Kamilla Rytter Juhl | 18–21, 17–21 | (silver) Runner-up |

BWF Grand Prix Gold tournament
BWF Grand Prix tournament

=== BWF International Challenge/Series ===
Women's doubles
| Year | Tournament | Partner | Opponent | Score | Result |
|---|---|---|---|---|---|
| 2005 | Czech International | (Denmark) Line Reimers | (Poland) Kamila Augustyn (Poland) Nadieżda Kostiuczyk | 2–15, 1–15 | (silver) Runner-up |
| 2006 | Czech International | (Denmark) Mie Schjøtt-Kristensen | (England) Sarah Bok (England) Rachel Howard | 17–21, 21–13, 22–20 | (gold) Winner |
| 2007 | Swedish International | (Denmark) Mie Schjøtt-Kristensen | (China) Guo Xin (China) Cai Jiani | 13–21, 14–21 | (silver) Runner-up |
| 2007 | Finnish International | (Denmark) Mie Schjøtt-Kristensen | (Netherlands) Rachel van Cutsen (Netherlands) Paulien van Dooremalen | 19–21, 21–10, 21–11 | (gold) Winner |
| 2007 | Polish Open | (Denmark) Mie Schjøtt-Kristensen | (Poland) Kamila Augustyn (Poland) Nadieżda Kostiuczyk | 17–21, 14–21 | (silver) Runner-up |
| 2007 | Czech International | (Denmark) Mie Schjøtt-Kristensen | (Russia) Elena Shimko (Russia) Tatjana Bibik | 21–11, 22–20 | (gold) Winner |

Mixed doubles
| Year | Tournament | Partner | Opponent | Score | Result |
|---|---|---|---|---|---|
| 2006 | Finnish International | (Denmark) Rasmus Bonde | (Denmark) Jonas Rasmussen (Denmark) Britta Andersen | 11–21, 15–21 | (silver) Runner-up |
| 2006 | Portugal International | (Denmark) Rasmus Bonde | (Denmark) Rasmus Mangor Andersen (Denmark) Mie Schjøtt-Kristensen | 13–21, 21–14, 18–21 | (silver) Runner-up |
| 2006 | Czech International | (Denmark) Rasmus Bonde | (England) Robin Middleton (England) Liza Parker | 16–21, 12–21 | (silver) Runner-up |
| 2007 | Swedish International | (Denmark) Rasmus Bonde | (Denmark) Jacob Chemnitz (Denmark) Julie Houmann | 21–12, 21–8 | (gold) Winner |
| 2007 | Portugal International | (Denmark) Rasmus Bonde | (Denmark) Mikkel Delbo Larsen (Denmark) Mie Schjøtt-Kristensen | 21–12, 21–6 | (gold) Winner |
| 2007 | Czech International | (Denmark) Rasmus Bonde | (Russia) Anton Nazarenko (Russia) Elena Chernyavskaya | 21–19, 21–12 | (gold) Winner |

BWF International Challenge tournament
BWF International Series tournament
