= Marie Røpke =

Danish badminton player (born 1987)

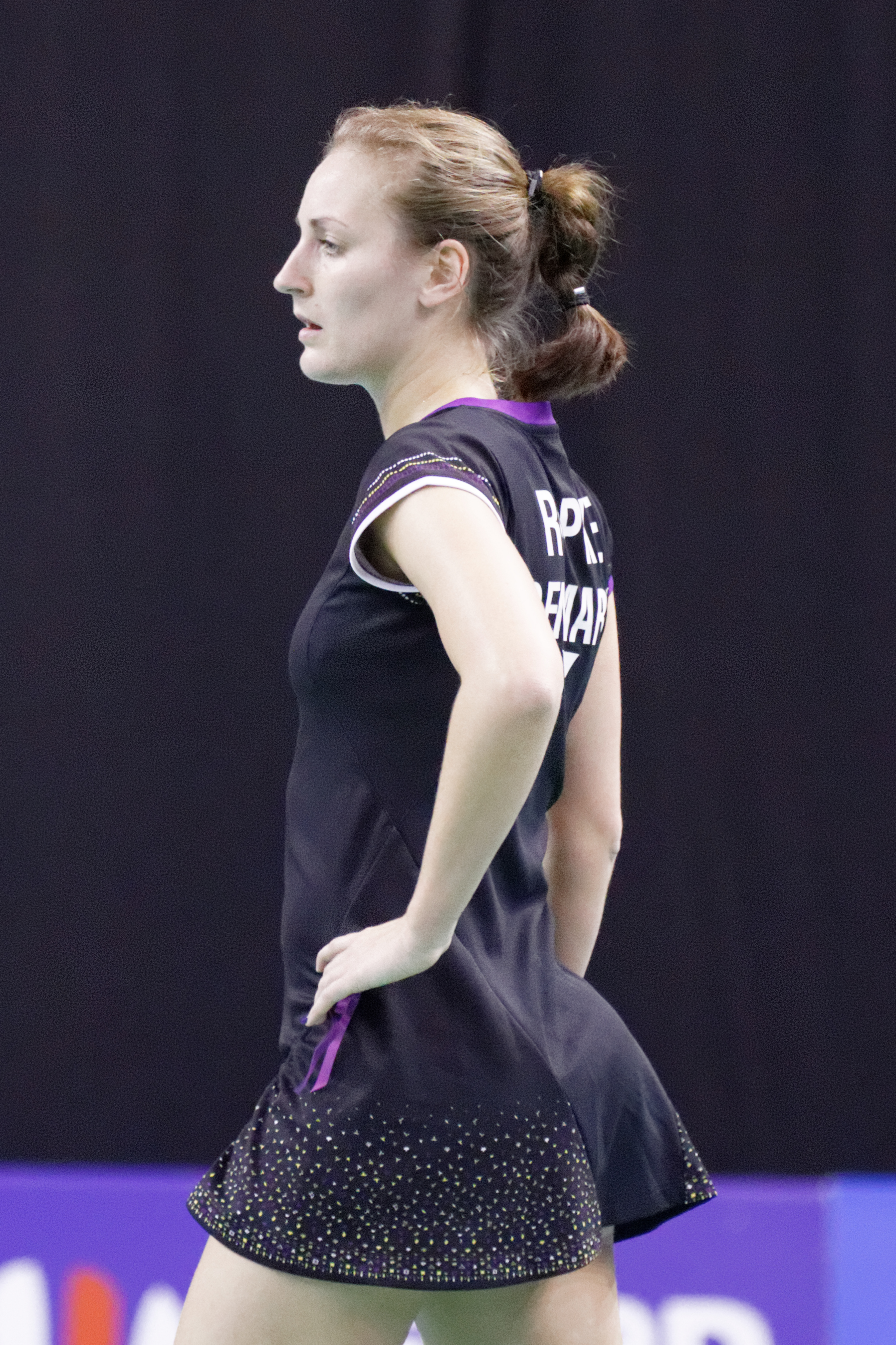

Personal information
- Born: 19 June 1987 (age 39)
- Height: 1.76 m (5 ft 9 in)

Sport
- Country: Denmark
- Sport: Badminton
- Handedness: Right

Women's & mixed doubles
- Highest ranking: 14 (WD 12 January 2012; 75 (XD 21 January 2010)
- BWF profile
Medal record
Women's badminton
Representing Denmark
Sudirman Cup
Silver medal – second place	2011 Qingdao	Mixed team
Bronze medal – third place	2013 Kuala Lumpur	Mixed team
European Championships
Silver medal – second place	2014 Kazan	Women's doubles
Silver medal – second place	2012 Karlskrona	Women's doubles
European Mixed Team Championships
Gold medal – first place	2009 Liverpool	Mixed team
European Women's Team Championships
Gold medal – first place	2014 Basel	Women's team
Gold medal – first place	2010 Warsaw	Women's team
Gold medal – first place	2008 Almere	Women's team
Silver medal – second place	2012 Amsterdam	Women's team
European Junior Championships
Gold medal – first place	2005 Den Bosch	Mixed team

Marie Røpke (born 19 June 1987) is a Danish badminton player.

== Personal life ==
Her mother Lene Køppen won women's singles at the first official World Badminton Championships in 1977 and is a member of the World Badminton Hall of Fame.

== Achievements ==
=== European Championships ===
Women's doubles
Year	Venue	Partner	Opponent	Score	Result
2012	Telenor Arena; Karlskrona, Sweden	(Denmark) Line Damkjær Kruse	(Denmark) Christinna Pedersen (Denmark) Kamilla Rytter Juhl	20–22, 21–13, 12–21	Silver
2014	Gymnastics Center; Kazan, Russia	(Denmark) Line Damkjær Kruse	(Denmark) Christinna Pedersen (Denmark) Kamilla Rytter Juhl	11–21, 11–21	Silver

=== BWF Grand Prix ===
The BWF Grand Prix had two levels, the Grand Prix and Grand Prix Gold. It was a series of badminton tournaments sanctioned by the Badminton World Federation (BWF) and played between 2007 and 2017.

Women's doubles
Year	Tournament	Partner	Opponent	Score	Result
2008	Bitburger Open	(Denmark) Helle Nielsen	(Indonesia) Shendy Puspa Irawati (Indonesia) Meiliana Jauhari	21–15, 21–18	(gold) Winner
2009	Bitburger Open	(Denmark) Helle Nielsen	(Denmark) Line Damkjær Kruse (Denmark) Mie Schjoett-Kristensen	18–21, 21–19, 21–19	(gold) Winner
2013	London Grand Prix Gold	(Denmark) Line Damkjær Kruse	(Denmark) Christinna Pedersen (Denmark) Kamilla Rytter Juhl	21–12, 17–21, 15–21	(silver) Runner-up

BWF Grand Prix Gold tournament
BWF Grand Prix tournament

=== BWF International Challenge/Series ===
Women's doubles
Year	Tournament	Partner	Opponent	Score	Result
2006	Portugal International	(Denmark) Line Damkjær Kruse	(England) Liza Parker (England) Jenny Day	13–21, 9–21	(silver) Runner-up
2008	Czech International	(Denmark) Helle Nielsen	(Belgium) Séverine Corvilain (Belgium) Nathalie Descamps	21–14, 21–15	(gold) Winner
2008	Irish International	(Denmark) Helle Nielsen	(Netherlands) Patty Stolzenbach (Netherlands) Paulien van Dooremalen	23–25, 21–17, 21–18	(gold) Winner
2009	Norwegian International	(Denmark) Helle Nielsen	(Netherlands) Samantha Barning (Netherlands) Eefje Muskens	21–13, 21–18	(gold) Winner
2010	Swedish International Stockholm	(Denmark) Helle Nielsen	(Netherlands) Lotte Jonathans (Netherlands) Paulien van Dooremalen	17–21, 21–15, 21–18	(gold) Winner
2011	Swedish International Stockholm	(Denmark) Line Damkjær Kruse	(Japan) Rie Eto (Japan) Yu Wakita	21–14, 21–16	(gold) Winner
2011	Austrian International	(Denmark) Line Damkjær Kruse	(Japan) Yuriko Miki (Japan) Koharu Yonemoto	24–26, 15–21	(silver) Runner-up
2011	Denmark International	(Denmark) Line Damkjær Kruse	(Denmark) Maria Helsbøl (Denmark) Anne Skelbæk	21–14, 21–14	(gold) Winner
2012	Denmark International	(Denmark) Line Damkjær Kruse	(England) Lauren Smith (England) Gabrielle White	21–18, 21–19	(gold) Winner
2013	Denmark International	(Denmark) Line Damkjær Kruse	(Sweden) Emelie Lennartsson (Sweden) Emma Wengberg	22–20, 21–11	(gold) Winner
2014	Swedish Masters	(Denmark) Line Damkjær Kruse	(Netherlands) Eefje Muskens (Netherlands) Selena Piek	19–21, 11–21	(silver) Runner-up
2014	Finnish Open	(Denmark) Line Damkjær Kruse	(Bulgaria) Gabriela Stoeva (Bulgaria) Stefani Stoeva	21–17, 21–14	(gold) Winner

Mixed doubles
Year	Tournament	Partner	Opponent	Score	Result
2008	Dutch International	(Denmark) Jacob Chemnitz	(Denmark) Rasmus Bonde (Denmark) Helle Nielsen	15–21, 12–21	(silver) Runner-up
2008	Irish International	(Denmark) Jacob Chemnitz	(Denmark) Kasper Faust Henriksen (Denmark) Britta Andersen	17–21, 21–17, 21–15	(gold) Winner

BWF International Challenge tournament
BWF International Series tournament
BWF Future Series tournament
