= Valeriy Atrashchenkov =

Ukrainian badminton player (born 1984)

Personal information
- Born: Валерій Володимирович Атращенков; 20 August 1984 (age 42) Kharkiv, Ukrainian SSR, Soviet Union
- Height: 1.84 m (6 ft 0 in)

Sport
- Country: Ukraine
- Sport: Badminton
- Handedness: Right
- Coached by: Gennadiy Makhnovskiy

Men's singles & doubles
- Highest ranking: 55 (MS 7 June 2012); 70 (MD 21 January 2010); 17 (XD 9 December 2010)
- BWF profile

Valeriy Volodymyrovych Atrashchenkov (Ukrainian: Валерій Володимирович Атращенков; born 20 August 1984) is a Ukrainian badminton player. He started playing badminton at the Kharkiv Polytechnic Institute Sports Centre in 1995, and made his international debut in 2000. Atrashchenkov was part of the national team that placed fourth in the Thomas Cup qualification in 2010 European Men's Team Championships.

== Achievements ==
=== BWF International Challenge/Series ===
Men's singles
Year	Tournament	Opponent	Score	Result
2014	Estonian International	(Denmark) Rasmus Fladberg	14–21, 14–21	(silver) Runner-up
2008	Slovak Open	(Denmark) Martin Delfs	21–18, 21–16	(gold) Winner

Men's doubles
Year	Tournament	Partner	Opponent	Score	Result
2009	Kharkiv International	(Ukraine) Vladislav Druzchenko	(Russia) Andrej Ashmarin (Russia) Andrey Ivanov	16–21, 21–23	(silver) Runner-up

Mixed doubles
Year	Tournament	Partner	Opponent	Score	Result
2017	Turkey International	(Ukraine) Yelyzaveta Zharka	(Germany) Peter Kaesbauer (Germany) Olga Konon	18–21, 20–22	(silver) Runner-up
2014	Kharkiv International	(Ukraine) Yelyzaveta Zharka	(Ukraine) Artem Pochtarev (Ukraine) Elena Prus	11–10, 7–11, 10–11, 6–11	(silver) Runner-up
2013	Finnish Open	(Ukraine) Anna Kobceva	(Denmark) Anders Skaarup Rasmussen (Denmark) Lena Grebak	21–13, 15–21, 11–21	(silver) Runner-up
2011	Bulgarian International	(Ukraine) Anna Kobceva	(England) Gary Fox (England) Samantha Ward	21–18, 19–21, 21–14	(gold) Winner
2010	Kharkiv International	(Ukraine) Elena Prus	(Belarus) Aliaksei Konakh (Belarus) Alesia Zaitsava	21–19, 21–16	(gold) Winner
2010	White Nights	(Ukraine) Elena Prus	(Russia) Evgeniy Dremin (Russia) Anastasia Russkikh	17–21, 14–21	(silver) Runner-up
2010	Austrian International	(Ukraine) Elena Prus	(Bulgaria) Stiliyan Makarski (Bulgaria) Diana Dimova	24–26, 21–17, 21–17	(gold) Winner
2010	Swedish International	(Ukraine) Elena Prus	(Denmark) Mads Pieler Kolding (Denmark) Britta Andersen	21–18, 18–21, 17–21	(silver) Runner-up
2009	Kharkiv International	(Ukraine) Elena Prus	(Russia) Andrej Ashmarin (Russia) Anastasia Prokopenko	Walkover	(gold) Winner
2009	Banuinvest International	(Ukraine) Elena Prus	(Wales) Richard Vaughan (Wales) Sarah Thomas	21–19, 21–12	(gold) Winner
2009	Austrian International	(Ukraine) Elena Prus	(England) Robert Adcock (England) Heather Olver	17–21, 18–21	(silver) Runner-up
2009	Swedish International	(Ukraine) Elena Prus	(England) Robert Adcock (England) Heather Olver	21–16, 21–11	(gold) Winner
2008	Slovak Open	(Ukraine) Elena Prus	(Ukraine) Dmytro Zavadsky (Ukraine) Mariya Diptan	21–19, 21–14	(gold) Winner
2008	Bulgarian International	(Ukraine) Elena Prus	(Russia) Vitalij Durkin (Russia) Nina Vislova	16–21, 10–21	(silver) Runner-up
2007	Hatzor International	(Ukraine) Elena Prus	(Austria) Heimo Gotschl (Austria) Claudia Mayer	21–16, 21–15	(gold) Winner
2007	Banuinvest International	(Ukraine) Elena Prus	(Czech Republic) Pavel Florián (Czech Republic) Martina Benešová	21–16, 21–12	(gold) Winner

BWF International Challenge tournament
BWF International Series tournament
BWF Future Series tournament
