= Elena Prus =

Ukrainian badminton player (born 1986)

Olena Prus
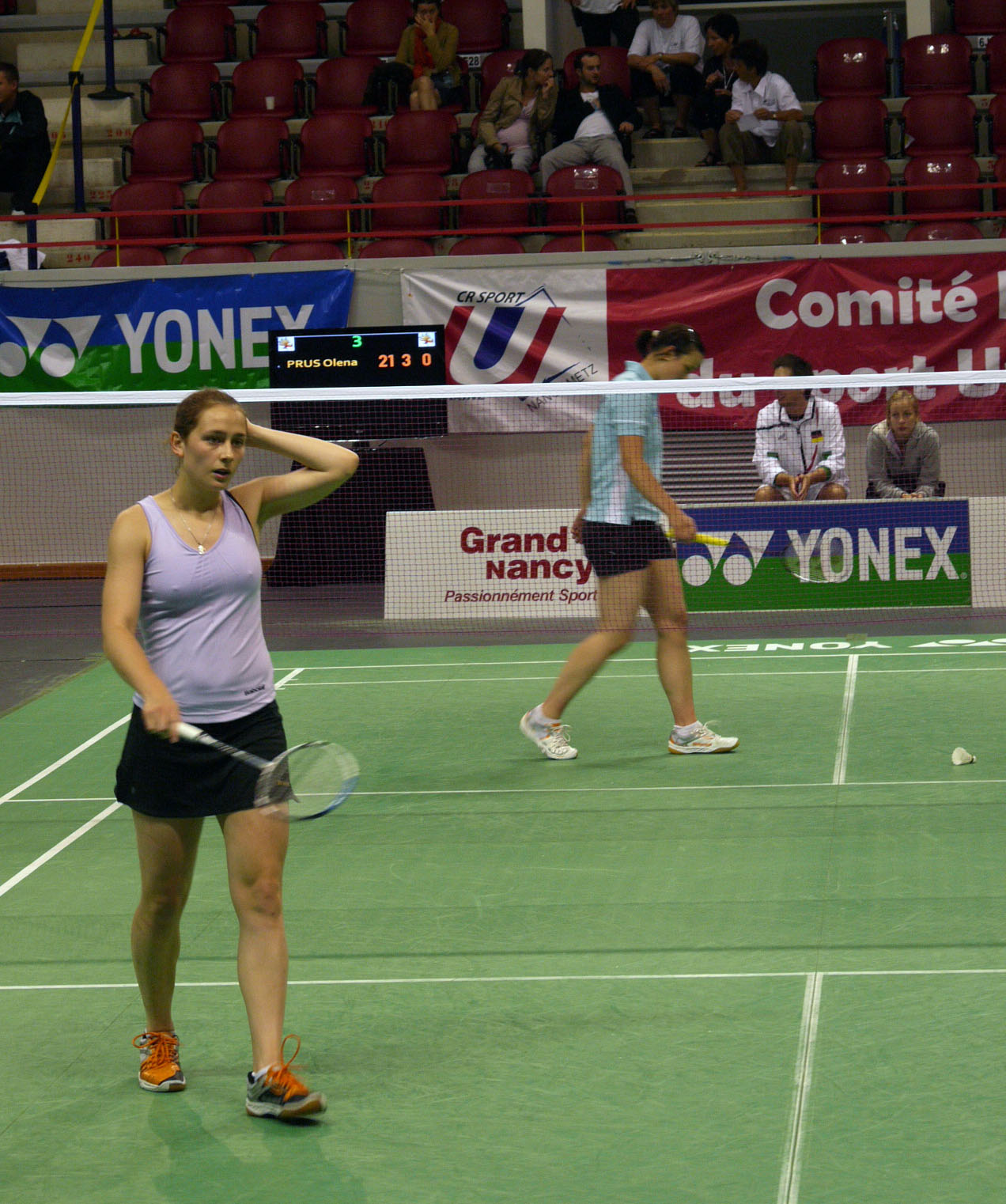

Personal information
- Born: Olena Volodymyrivna Prus; 30 April 1986 (age 40) Lysychansk, Ukrainian SSR, Soviet Union

Sport
- Country: Ukraine
- Sport: Badminton

Women's singles & doubles
- Highest ranking: 49 (WS 8 April 2010); 33 (WD with Anna Kobceva 23 September 2010); 17 (XD with Valeriy Atrashchenkov 9 December 2010)
- BWF profile

Olena Volodymyrivna Prus (Ukrainian: Олена Володимирівна Прус; born 30 April 1986) is a Ukrainian badminton player. Prus works as a coach in Badminton Kharkiv.

== Achievements ==
=== BWF International Challenge/Series ===
Women's singles
Year	Tournament	Opponent	Score	Result
2007	Hatzor International	(England) Tracey Hallam	9–21, 15–21	(silver) Runner-up
2008	Slovak Open	(Denmark) Laerke Folsted	21–16, 21–17	(gold) Winner
2009	White Nights	(Russia) Ella Diehl	10–21, 10–21	(silver) Runner-up

Women's doubles
Year	Tournament	Partner	Opponent	Score	Result
2009	Kharkiv International	(Ukraine) Anna Kobceva	(Russia) Tatjana Bibik (Russia) Olga Golovanova	8–21, 21–18, 21–18	(gold) Winner
2010	Kharkiv International	(Ukraine) Anna Kobceva	(Ukraine) Marija Ulitina (Ukraine) Natalya Voytsekh	21–23, 12–21	(silver) Runner-up
2011	Lithuanian International	(Ukraine) Anna Kobceva	(Ukraine) Marija Ulitina (Ukraine) Natalya Voytsekh	21–12, 21–19	(gold) Winner

Mixed doubles
Year	Tournament	Partner	Opponent	Score	Result
2007	Banuinvest International	(Ukraine) Valeriy Atrashchenkov	(Czech Republic) Pavel Florián (Czech Republic) Martina Benešová	21–16, 21–12	(gold) Winner
2007	Hatzor International	(Ukraine) Valeriy Atrashchenkov	(Austria) Heimo Götschl (Austria) Claudia Mayer	21–16, 21–15	(gold) Winner
2008	Bulgarian International	(Ukraine) Valeriy Atrashchenkov	(Russia) Vitalij Durkin (Russia) Nina Vislova	16–21, 10–21	(silver) Runner-up
2008	Slovak Open	(Ukraine) Valeriy Atrashchenkov	(Ukraine) Dmytro Zavadsky (Ukraine) Maria Diptan	21–19, 21–14	(gold) Winner
2009	Swedish International	(Ukraine) Valeriy Atrashchenkov	(England) Robert Adcock (England) Heather Olver	21–16, 21–11	(gold) Winner
2009	Austrian International	(Ukraine) Valeriy Atrashchenkov	(England) Robert Adcock (England) Heather Olver	17–21 18–21	(silver) Runner-up
2009	Banuinvest International	(Ukraine) Valeriy Atrashchenkov	(Wales) Richard Vaughan (Wales) Sarah Thomas	21–19, 21–12	(gold) Winner
2009	Kharkiv International	(Ukraine) Valeriy Atrashchenkov	(Russia) Andrey Ashmarin (Russia) Anastasia Prokopenko	Walkover	(gold) Winner
2010	Swedish International	(Ukraine) Valeriy Atrashchenkov	(Denmark) Mads Pieler Kolding (Denmark) Britta Andersen	21–18, 18–21, 17–21	(silver) Runner-up
2010	Austrian International	(Ukraine) Valeriy Atrashchenkov	(Bulgaria) Stiliyan Makarski (Bulgaria) Diana Dimova	24–26, 21–17, 21–17	(gold) Winner
2010	White Nights	(Ukraine) Valeriy Atrashchenkov	(Russia) Evgenij Dremin (Russia) Anastasia Russkikh	17–21, 14–21	(silver) Runner-up
2010	Kharkiv International	(Ukraine) Valeriy Atrashchenkov	(Belarus) Aleksei Konakh (Belarus) Alesia Zaitsava	21–19, 21–16	(gold) Winner
2014	Kharkiv International	(Ukraine) Artem Pochtarov	(Ukraine) Valeriy Atrashchenkov (Ukraine) Yelyzaveta Zharka	10–11, 11–7, 11–10, 11–6	(gold) Winner

BWF International Challenge tournament
BWF International Series tournament
BWF Future Series tournament
