= Jenny Wallwork =

English badminton player

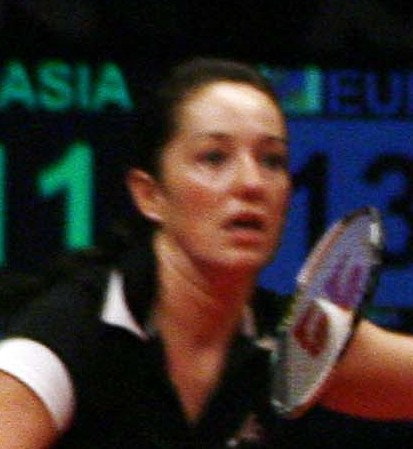
- Jenny Wallwork at Axiata Cup

Personal information
- Born: Jenny Wallwork; 17 January 1987 (age 39) Bolton, England
- Height: 5 ft 9 in (175 cm)

Sport
- Country: England
- Sport: Badminton
- Handedness: Right

Women's and Mixed doubles
- Highest ranking: 5 (12 September 2010)
- BWF profile
Medal record
Women's badminton
Representing England
Commonwealth Games
Silver medal – second place	2010 Delhi	Mixed doubles
Bronze medal – third place	2010 Delhi	Mixed team
European Championships
Bronze medal – third place	2010 Manchester	Mixed doubles
European Mixed Team Championships
Gold medal – first place	2013 Moscow	Mixed team
Silver medal – second place	2009 Liverpool	Mixed team
Bronze medal – third place	2011 Amsterdam	Mixed team
Commonwealth Youth Games
Bronze medal – third place	2004 Bendigo	Mixed team
European Junior Championships
Silver medal – second place	2005 Den Bosch	Mixed doubles

Jennifer "Jenny" Wallwork (born 17 January 1987 in Bolton) is an English badminton player who has achieved international success in both the women's events and the mixed doubles event, including a Commonwealth Silver medal in 2010. She represented her country 42 times, being the highest ranking female player for 4 years.

== Career ==
Wallwork won the mixed doubles Bulgarian International in 2004, the Scottish Open in 2005, and the Dutch Open in 2006. She won the Swedish International mixed doubles in 2012. She won the women's doubles at the Irish International in 2005. Her mother, Jill played badminton for England, and her father, Brian is a coach for the sport.

In 2011, Jenny won both the mixed and women's doubles at the English National Championships but 2013 she quit professional badminton after saying she was undervalued and ignored by the governing body Badminton England.

In 2023, she won her sixth national doubles title at the English National Badminton Championships, at the David Ross Sports Village in Nottingham. It was her first national title since 2012.

== Record against selected opponents ==
Mixed Doubles results with Nathan Robertson against Super Series finalists, World Championships semifinalists, and Olympic quarterfinalists.

- (China) Xu Chen & Ma Jin 0–3
- (China) Zhang Nan & Zhao Yunlei 0–2
- (China) Zheng Bo & Ma Jin 0–1
- (Chinese Taipei) Chen Hung-ling & Cheng Wen-hsing 1–3
- (Chinese Taipei) Lee Sheng-mu & Chien Yu-chin 1–0
- (Denmark) Joachim Fischer Nielsen & Christinna Pedersen 0–2
- (Denmark) Thomas Laybourn & Kamilla Rytter Juhl 1–4
- (England) / (Scotland) Chris Adcock & Imogen Bankier 1–0
- (England) Anthony Clark & Donna Kellogg 0–1
- (Indonesia) Tontowi Ahmad & Liliyana Natsir 1–2
- (Indonesia) Fran Kurniawan & Pia Zebadiah Bernadet 1–0
- (Indonesia) Nova Widianto & Liliyana Natsir 0–1
- (Malaysia) Koo Kien Keat & Wong Pei Tty 0–2
- (Poland) Robert Mateusiak & Nadieżda Zięba 1–2
- (Thailand) Songphon Anugritayawon & Kunchala Voravichitchaikul 1–1
- (Thailand) Sudket Prapakamol & Saralee Thungthongkam 1–1

== Recognition ==
Her name is one of those featured on the sculpture Ribbons, unveiled in 2024.
