= Croatian National Badminton Championships =

The Croatian National Badminton Championships is a tournament organized to crown the best badminton players in Croatia. They are held since 1992.

== Past winners ==
| Year | Men's singles | Women's singles | Men's doubles | Women's doubles | Mixed doubles |
|---|---|---|---|---|---|
| 1992 | Marko Goljak | Andrea Jurčić | No competition | | |
| 1993 | Tomislav Furdin | Andrea Jurčić | Alan Kreizeger; Daniel Lacko | Andrea Jurčić; Tanja Vejnović | Daniel Lacko; Andrea Jurčić |
| 1994 | Antun Horvat | Andrea Jurčić | Antun Horvat; Tomislav Furdin | Renata Horvat; Lidija Petrinović | Antun Horvat; Renata Horvat |
| 1995 | Tomislav Furdin | Andrea Jurčić | Antun Horvat; Tomislav Furdin | Andrea Jurčić; Snježana Milešević | Silvio Jurčić; Andrea Jurčić |
| 1996 | Tomislav Furdin | Andrea Jurčić | Silvio Jurčić; Miroslav Sikavica | Andrea Jurčić; Snježana Milešević | Silvio Jurčić; Andrea Jurčić |
| 1997 | Tomislav Furdin | Andrea Jurčić | Tomislav Furdin; Antun Horvat | Andrea Jurčić; Snježana Milešević | Silvio Jurčić; Andrea Jurčić |
| 1998 | Vedran Ciganović | Andrea Jurčić | Arni Badjuk; Damir Ilić | Andrea Jurčić; Snježana Milešević | Silvio Jurčić; Andrea Jurčić |
| 1999 | Silvio Jurčić | Andrea Jurčić | Josip Bare; Janko Hranilović | Andrea Jurčić; Morana Esih | Silvio Jurčić; Andrea Jurčić |
| 2000 | Vedran Ciganović | Andrea Jurčić | Tomislav Furdin; Antun Horvat | Mateja Šalov; Maja Šavor | Silvio Jurčić; Andrea Jurčić |
| 2001 | Vedran Ciganović | Matea Čiča | Vedran Ciganović; Hrvoje Kazesović | Mateja Čiča; Morana Esih | Vedran Ciganović; Ana Jurić |
| 2002 | Vedran Ciganović | Matea Čiča | Vedran Ciganović; Janko Hranilović | Matea Čiča; Morana Esih | Neven Rihtar; Maja Šavor |
| 2003 | Vedran Ciganović | Andrea Žvorc | Vedran Ciganović; Janko Hranilović | Andrea Žvorc; Staša Poznanović | Neven Rihtar; Maja Šavor |
| 2004 | Vedran Ciganović | Matea Čiča | Zvonimir Đurkinjak; Luka Zdenjak | Matea Čiča; Morana Esih | Neven Rihtar; Maja Šavor |
| 2005 | Neven Rihtar | No competition | Neven Rihtar; Vedran Ciganović | No competition | Zvonimir Đurkinjak; Andrea Žvorc |
| 2006 | Vedran Ciganović | Andrea Žvorc | Zvonimir Đurkinjak; Luka Zdenjak | Andrea Žvorc; Staša Poznanović | Zvonimir Đurkinjak; Staša Poznanović |
| 2007 | Zvonimir Đurkinjak | Andrea Žvorc | Zvonimir Đurkinjak; Luka Zdenjak | Matea Čiča; Morana Esih | Zvonimir Đurkinjak; Staša Poznanović |
| 2008 | Luka Zdenjak | Petra Petranović | Zvonimir Đurkinjak; Luka Zdenjak | Matea Čiča; Staša Poznanović | Zvonimir Đurkinjak; Staša Poznanović |
| 2009 | Zvonimir Đurkinjak | Andrea Žvorc | Igor Čimbur; Zvonimir Hölbling | Matea Čiča; Andrea Žvorc | Igor Čimbur; Matea Čiča |
| 2010 | Zvonimir Đurkinjak | Andrea Žvorc | Igor Čimbur; Zvonimir Hölbling | Matea Čiča; Staša Poznanović | Zvonimir Đurkinjak; Staša Poznanović |
| 2011 | Zvonimir Đurkinjak | Andrea Žvorc | Igor Čimbur; Zvonimir Hölbling | Staša Poznanović; Lucija Vlah | Zvonimir Đurkinjak; Staša Poznanović |
| 2012 | Zvonimir Đurkinjak | Maja Pavlinić | Igor Čimbur; Zvonimir Hölbling | Matea Čiča; Staša Poznanović | Zvonimir Đurkinjak; Staša Poznanović |
| 2013 | Zvonimir Đurkinjak | Maja Pavlinić | Zvonimir Đurkinjak; Filip Špoljarec | Katarina Galenić; Staša Poznanović | Zvonimir Đurkinjak; Staša Poznanović |
| 2014 | Zvonimir Đurkinjak | Dorotea Sutara | Zvonimir Đurkinjak; Filip Špoljarec | Matea Čiča; Staša Poznanović | Zvonimir Hölbling; Matea Čiča |
| 2015 | Zvonimir Đurkinjak | Maja Pavlinić | Zvonimir Đurkinjak; Filip Špoljarec | Matea Čiča; Staša Poznanović | Zvonimir Hölbling; Matea Čiča |
| 2016 | Zvonimir Đurkinjak | Matea Čiča | Zvonimir Đurkinjak; Filip Špoljarec | Matea Čiča; Staša Poznanović | Zvonimir Hölbling; Matea Čiča |
| 2017 | Zvonimir Đurkinjak | Maja Pavlinić | Igor Čimbur; Zvonimir Hölbling | Matea Čiča; Staša Poznanović | Igor Čimbur; Matea Čiča |
| 2018 | Josip Uglešić | Maja Pavlinić | Igor Čimbur; Zvonimir Hölbling | Matea Čiča; Staša Poznanović | Filip Špoljarec; Maja Pavlinić |
| 2019 | Zvonimir Đurkinjak | Matea Čiča | Igor Čimbur; Zvonimir Hölbling | Katarina Galenić; Maja Pavlinić | Zvonimir Đurkinjak; Katarina Galenić |
| 2020 | Luka Ban | Matea Čiča | Igor Čimbur; Zvonimir Hölbling | Katarina Galenić; Maja Pavlinić | Zvonimir Hölbling; Matea Čiča |
| 2021 | Filip Špoljarec | Jelena Buchberger | Luka Ban; Filip Špoljarec | Matea Čiča; Katarina Galenić | Luka Ban; Dora Drvodelić |
| 2022 | Filip Špoljarec | Jelena Buchberger | Igor Čimbur; Zvonimir Hölbling | Matea Čiča; Katarina Galenić | Zvonimir Đurkinjak; Katarina Galenić |
| 2023 | Filip Špoljarec | Jelena Buchberger | Igor Čimbur; Zvonimir Hölbling | Dora Drvodelić; Katarina Galenić | Zvonimir Hölbling; Katarina Galenić |
| 2024 | Filip Špoljarec | Jelena Buchberger | Igor Čimbur; Zvonimir Hölbling | Dora Drvodelić; Katarina Galenić | Filip Špoljarec; Katarina Galenić |
| 2025 | Aria Dinata | Jelena Buchberger | Igor Čimbur; Zvonimir Hölbling | Matea Čiča; Ana Pranić | Filip Špoljarec; Matea Čiča |
