= 2020 European Men's Team Badminton Championships squads =

This article lists the latest men's squads lists for badminton's 2020 European Men's and Women's Team Badminton Championships. Ranking stated are based on world ranking date for 21 January 2020 as per tournament's prospectus.

== Group 1 ==
Group 1 consists of Denmark, Wales, Latvia, and Switzerland.

=== Denmark ===
Name	DoB/Age	MS Rank	MD Rank
Viktor Axelsen	4 January 1994 (aged 26)	3	–
Anders Antonsen	27 April 1997 (aged 22)	6	–
Jan Ø. Jørgensen	31 December 1987 (aged 32)	22	-
Hans-Kristian Vittinghus	16 January 1986 (aged 34)	34	-
Kim Astrup	6 March 1992 (aged 27)	–	14
Anders Skaarup Rasmussen	15 February 1989 (aged 30)	–	14
Mathias Boe	11 July 1980 (aged 39)	–	19
Mads Conrad-Petersen	12 January 1988 (aged 32)	–	19
Frederik Søgaard	25 July 1997 (aged 22)	–	85
Carsten Mogensen	24 July 1983 (aged 36)	–	136

=== Wales ===
Name	DoB/Age	MS Rank	MD Rank
Andrew Oates	29 July 1999 (aged 20)	–	1313
Nic Strange	26 March 1987 (aged 32)	–	1313
Andrew Jones	11 October 1997 (aged 22)	1032	447
Adam Stewart	18 March 1996 (aged 23)	1494	447
Mo Tsung Fong	16 May 1997 (aged 22)	998	966
Victor Pang	11 May 1994 (aged 25)	1728	966
William Kitching	12 June 1996 (aged 23)	1245	1313
Scott Oates	10 April 1998 (aged 21)	1422	1313

=== Latvia ===
Name	DoB/Age	MS Rank	MD Rank
Andis Berzins	9 February 1992 (aged 28)	1024	–
Ivo Keiss	22 August 1978 (aged 41)	1933	-
Pauls Gureckis	26 May 1993 (aged 26)	1997	-
Viesturs Bajars	11 March 1981 (aged 38)	–	–
Niks Podosinoviks	27 July 1998 (aged 21)	–	-
Toms Preinbergs	10 August 1988 (aged 31)	–	-

=== Switzerland ===
Name	DoB/Age	MS Rank	MD Rank
Joel König	6 July 1995 (aged 24)	201	–
Yann Orteu	23 September 2001 (aged 18)	–	562
Christian Kirchmayr	19 January 1994 (aged 26)	133	1442
Tobias Kuenzi	18 February 1998 (aged 21)	205	561
Nicolas A. Mueller	28 December 2000 (aged 19)	464	275
Julien Scheiwiller	24 September 1999 (aged 20)	564	275
Pham Minh Quang	7 May 2001 (aged 18)	–	-

== Group 2 ==
Group 2 consists of England, Estonia, Greenland, and Sweden.

=== England ===
Name	DoB/Age	MS Rank	MD Rank
Toby Penty	12 August 1992 (aged 27)	54	-
Alex Lane	29 August 1995 (aged 24)	126	-
Harry Huang	25 August 2001 (aged 18)	398	–
Marcus Ellis	14 September 1989 (aged 30)	–	22
Chris Langridge	2 May 1985 (aged 34)	–	22
Ben Lane	13 July 1997 (aged 22)	–	31
Sean Vendy	18 May 1996 (aged 23)	–	31
Tom Wolfenden	23 February 1994 (aged 25)	–	122
Gregory Mairs	7 November 1994 (aged 25)	–	128
David Jones	17 January 1998 (aged 22)	315	538

=== Estonia ===
Name	DoB/Age	MS Rank	MD Rank
Raul Must	9 November 1987 (aged 32)	90	-
Artur Ajupov	27 February 2002 (aged 17)	1494	–
Kristjan Kaljurand	13 July 1992 (aged 27)	–	217
Raul Käsner	28 June 1988 (aged 31)	–	217
Mikk Järveoja	22 February 1994 (aged 25)	–	562
Mihkel Talts	2 April 1994 (aged 25)	1291	424
Mihkel Laanes	7 June 1997 (aged 22)	799	562
Karl Kert	16 August 2000 (aged 19)	771	694
Hans-Kristjan Pilve	6 February 2001 (aged 19)	850	694

=== Greenland ===
Name	DoB/Age	MS Rank	MD Rank
Toke Ketwa-Driefer	7 October 1998 (aged 21)	1140	–
Jens-Frederik Nielsen	22 June 1991 (aged 28)	589	952
Sebastian Reimer Bendtsen	1 June 1995 (aged 24)	–	–
Taatsiannguaq Pedersen	1 November 1991 (aged 28)	–	-
Sequssuna Fleischer Schmidt	13 May 1992 (aged 27)	–	-

=== Sweden ===
Name	DoB/Age	MS Rank	MD Rank
Felix Burestedt	26 February 1995 (aged 24)	56	–
Jacob Nilsson	1 January 1994 (aged 26)	188	-
Andy Tsai	23 April 1996 (aged 23)	245	-
Albin Carl Hjelm	26 July 1993 (aged 26)	275	-
Ludvig Petre Olsson	23 February 2001 (aged 18)	807	-
Carl Harrbacka	9 April 1999 (aged 20)	–	200
Melker Z-Bexell	17 April 2000 (aged 19)	–	200
Tim Foo	28 May 1987 (aged 32)	–	–
Joel Hansson	25 September 2001 (aged 18)	–	-

== Group 3 ==
Group 3 consists of France, Belgium, Hungary, and Turkey.

=== France ===
Name	DoB/Age	MS Rank	MD Rank
Brice Leverdez	9 April 1986 (aged 33)	38	-
Lucas Claerbout	22 October 1992 (aged 27)	80	-
Thom Gicquel	12 January 1999 (aged 21)	–	64
Ronan Labar	3 May 1989 (aged 30)	–	64
Eloi Adam	16 March 1999 (aged 20)	–	80
Julien Maio	6 May 1994 (aged 25)	–	80
Samy Corvee	10 June 1999 (aged 20)	–	116
William Villeger	22 October 2000 (aged 19)	–	116
Fabien Delrue	22 June 2000 (aged 19)	–	302
Toma Junior Popov	29 September 1998 (aged 21)	63	102
Christo Popov	8 March 2002 (aged 17)	88	102
Arnaud Merklé	24 April 2000 (aged 19)	118	972

=== Belgium ===
Name	DoB/Age	MS Rank	MD Rank
Maxime Moreels	12 June 1991 (aged 28)	115	-
Elias Bracke	26 September 1998 (aged 21)	202	-
Julien Carraggi	2 July 2000 (aged 19)	213	-
Rowan Scheurkogel	9 November 1996 (aged 23)	578	-
Senne Houthoofd	18 September 2001 (aged 18)	1254	–
Jona van Nieuwkerke	23 January 2000 (aged 20)	–	275
Freek Golinski	19 June 1991 (aged 28)	–	386
Floris Oleffe	24 March 1993 (aged 26)	–	1362

=== Hungary ===
Name	DoB/Age	MS Rank	MD Rank
Gergely Krausz	25 December 1995 (aged 24)	103	–
Gergo Pytel	11 March 1999 (aged 20)	302	-
Andras Piliszky	25 October 1992 (aged 27)	1500	-
Balasz Papai	27 January 2000 (aged 20)	1933	–
Mate Balint	2 January 2000 (aged 20)	–	-
Bene Benjamin Kiss	28 March 2003 (aged 16)	–	-
Balint Papai	31 July 2002 (aged 17)	–	-
Marton Szerecz	27 February 1997 (aged 22)	–	-
Gergely Szita	8 January 2003 (aged 17)	–	-

=== Turkey ===
Name	DoB/Age	MS Rank	MD Rank
Emre Lale	14 October 1993 (aged 26)	112	-
Mehmet Capar	20 February 1999 (aged 20)	–	197
Emre Sonmez	24 July 1999 (aged 20)	–	197
Serdar Koca	28 February 1994 (aged 25)	–	198
Serhat Salim	6 March 1998 (aged 21)	–	198
Murathan Eken	14 July 1998 (aged 21)	551	470
Haktan Doğan	5 January 1996 (aged 24)	525	694

== Group 4 ==
Group 4 consists of Russia, Austria, Ireland, and Poland.

=== Russia ===
Name	DoB/Age	MS Rank	MD Rank
Vladimir Malkov	9 April 1986 (aged 33)	69	-
Sergey Sirant	12 April 1994 (aged 25)	76	-
Vladimir Ivanov	3 July 1987 (aged 32)	–	28
Ivan Sozonov	6 July 1989 (aged 30)	–	28
Nikita Khakimov	13 June 1988 (aged 31)	–	76
Alexandr Zinchenko	6 February 1995 (aged 25)	–	76
Denis Grachev	18 January 1992 (aged 28)	–	109
Rodion Alimov	21 April 1998 (aged 21)	–	183
Georgii Lebedev	9 January 2002 (aged 18)	–	1033
Pavel Kotsarenko	8 June 1998 (aged 21)	365	109
Georgii Karpov	17 July 2001 (aged 18)	162	171

=== Austria ===
Name	DoB/Age	MS Rank	MD Rank
Luka Wraber	7 September 1990 (aged 29)	94	-
Wolfgang Gnedt	28 May 1997 (aged 22)	199	-
Leon Seiwald	24 November 1996 (aged 23)	260	-
Philip Birker	8 May 1998 (aged 21)	–	88
Dominik Stipsits	1 September 1994 (aged 25)	–	88
Philipp Drexler	22 November 1999 (aged 20)	759	347
Kilian Meusburger	4 December 2000 (aged 19)	1139	536

=== Ireland ===
Name	DoB/Age	MS Rank	MD Rank
Paul Reynolds	8 March 1999 (aged 20)	–	90
Sam Magee	9 January 1990 (aged 30)	–	1389
Nhat Nguyen	16 June 2000 (aged 19)	68	1389
Joshua Magee	3 November 1994 (aged 25)	224	90
Jonathan Dolan	19 December 1994 (aged 25)	204	347
Jack O'Brien	19 May 1997 (aged 22)	991	267
David Walsh	23 May 1994 (aged 25)	389	347
Mark Brady	3 April 1995 (aged 24)	1287	556
Adam Mcallister	1 July 2000 (aged 19)	1569	556
Magee Daniel		–	-
Sam McKay	9 June 1998 (aged 21)	–	-

=== Poland ===
Name	DoB/Age	MS Rank	MD Rank
Michał Rogalski	23 June 1987 (aged 32)	106	-
Mateusz Swierczynski	5 March 1995 (aged 24)	278	-
Mateusz Dubowski	22 November 1992 (aged 27)	342	-
Adam Cwalina	26 January 1985 (aged 35)	–	175
Paweł Śmiłowski	26 August 1998 (aged 21)	–	296
Wiktor Trecki	15 December 2001 (aged 18)	–	369
Przemyslaw Szydlowski	12 April 1996 (aged 23)	–	427
Mikolaj Szymanowski	27 November 2003 (aged 16)	–	-

== Group 5 ==
Group 5 consists of Germany, Azerbaijan, Czech Republic, and Iceland.

=== Germany ===
Name	DoB/Age	MS Rank	MD Rank
Kai Schäfer	13 June 1993 (aged 26)	78	-
Max Weißkirchen	18 October 1996 (aged 23)	130	-
Lars Schänzler	24 August 1995 (aged 24)	166	-
Mark Lamsfuß	19 April 1994 (aged 25)	–	17
Marvin Emil Seidel	9 November 1995 (aged 24)	–	17
Jones Ralfy Jansen	12 November 1992 (aged 27)	–	39
Peter Käsbauer	17 March 1988 (aged 31)	–	39
Bjarne Geiss	29 November 1997 (aged 22)	–	58
Jan Colin Völker	26 February 1998 (aged 21)	–	58
Johannes Pistorius	16 June 1995 (aged 24)	–	386
Samuel Hsiao	25 December 1998 (aged 21)	227	538
Fabian Roth	29 November 1995 (aged 24)	–	-

=== Azerbaijan ===
Name	DoB/Age	MS Rank	MD Rank
Ade Resky Dwicahyo	13 May 1998 (aged 21)	77	218
Azmy Qowimuramadhoni	1 January 1999 (aged 21)	163	218
Jahid Alhasanov	24 June 1995 (aged 24)	1017	253
Sabuhi Huseynov	18 July 2000 (aged 19)	979	253
Agil Gabilov	9 October 2004 (aged 15)	1261	439
Ravan Niftaliyev	31 January 2004 (aged 16)	1261	439
Zaur Isazade	15 October 2003 (aged 16)	1728	694
Vagif Ismayilov	20 April 2002 (aged 17)	1261	1206
Orkhan Galandarov	11 June 1988 (aged 31)	1422	1362

=== Czech Republic ===
Name	DoB/Age	MS Rank	MD Rank
Milan Ludík	9 September 1992 (aged 27)	140	-
Adam Mendrek	14 November 1995 (aged 24)	153	-
Jan Louda	25 April 1999 (aged 20)	216	-
Ondřej Král	15 April 1999 (aged 20)	339	-
Jaromír Janáček	18 March 1995 (aged 24)	–	74
Tomáš Švejda	14 March 2002 (aged 17)	–	74
Matěj Hubáček	16 November 1999 (aged 20)	–	269
Vít Kulíšek	13 June 2001 (aged 18)	–	269
Jakub Bitman	22 July 1988 (aged 31)	–	1362
Jiří Král	19 December 2000 (aged 19)	474	1237
Jan Janoštík	19 November 2003 (aged 16)	1933	972

=== Iceland ===
Name	DoB/Age	MS Rank	MD Rank
Kari Gunnarsson		144	-
David Bjarni Bjornsson	9 May 1998 (aged 21)	–	263
Kristofer Darri Finnsson	19 June 1997 (aged 22)	800	263
Daniel Johannesson	26 April 1996 (aged 23)	1010	264

== Group 6 ==
Group 6 consists of Netherlands, Lithuania, Luxembourg, and Slovakia.

=== Netherlands ===
Name	DoB/Age	MS Rank	MD Rank
Mark Caljouw	25 January 1995 (aged 25)	31	-
Joran Kweekel	16 May 1998 (aged 21)	142	-
Finn Achthoven	1 February 2002 (aged 18)	1228	-
Jelle Maas	19 February 1991 (aged 28)	–	36
Robin Tabeling	24 April 1994 (aged 25)	–	36
Jacco Arends	28 January 1991 (aged 29)	–	70
Ruben Jille	11 July 1996 (aged 23)	–	70
Ties van der Lecq	10 March 2000 (aged 19)	–	132
Wessel van der Aar	25 March 2001 (aged 18)	–	421
Nick Fransman	28 February 1992 (aged 27)	–	-

=== Lithuania ===
Name	DoB/Age	MS Rank	MD Rank
Mark Sames	29 October 1999 (aged 20)	601	1033
Jonas Petkus	23 July 2001 (aged 18)	1412	952
Ignas Reznikas	29 September 1995 (aged 24)	1554	952
Danielius Beržanskis	29 May 2003 (aged 16)	1919	1237
Edgaras Slusnys	21 July 1991 (aged 28)	1997	1237

=== Luxembourg ===
Name	DoB/Age	MS Rank	MD Rank
Robert Mann	20 June 1985 (aged 34)	197	449
Mattias Sonderskov	11 July 1998 (aged 21)	611	972
Kevin Hargiono	2 April 2002 (aged 17)	1284	972
Leo Hölzmer	3 January 2002 (aged 18)	1560	1395
Yannick Feltes	10 February 2004 (aged 16)	–	-
Jerome Pauquet	5 January 2004 (aged 16)	–	-
Maxime Szturma	9 October 1994 (aged 25)	–	-
William Wang	15 December 2005 (aged 14)	–	-

=== Slovakia ===
Name	DoB/Age	MS Rank	MD Rank
Andrej Antoska	12 January 2002 (aged 18)	–	439
Jakub Horak	15 August 2001 (aged 18)	–	439
Miroslav Haring	12 February 1993 (aged 26)	–	694
Milan Dratva	24 April 1996 (aged 23)	169	1442
Juraj Vachalek	31 October 1990 (aged 29)	1787	694
Boris Karpjak	24 June 2003 (aged 16)	–	-
Lukas Kudlak	23 August 2003 (aged 16)	–	-
Peter Radoczi	13 October 2003 (aged 16)	–	-

== Group 7 ==
Group 7 consists of Finland, Norway, Portugal, Slovenia, and Ukraine.

=== Finland ===
Name	DoB/Age	MS Rank	MD Rank
Kalle Koljonen	26 February 1994 (aged 25)	89	-
Eetu Heino	5 September 1988 (aged 31)	92	-
Iikka Heino	9 January 1995 (aged 25)	170	-
Joonas Korhonen	23 August 1994 (aged 25)	234	-
Anton Kaisti	17 May 1992 (aged 27)	–	149
Oskari Larkimo	12 December 1993 (aged 26)	–	149
Anton Monnberg	2 May 1999 (aged 20)	1020	221
Jesper Paul	18 April 1999 (aged 20)	421	221
Joakim Oldorff	14 December 2002 (aged 17)	539	408

=== Norway ===
Name	DoB/Age	MS Rank	MD Rank
Peter Roenn Stensaeth	25 September 1997 (aged 22)	257	-
Sturla Flaten Jorgensen	3 February 1996 (aged 24)	–	172
Carl Christian Mork	13 June 1997 (aged 22)	–	172
Magnus Christensen	27 June 1995 (aged 24)	–	216
Fredrik Kristensen	26 July 1995 (aged 24)	–	216
Torjus Flaatten	25 June 1997 (aged 22)	563	181
Vegard Rikheim	28 September 1997 (aged 22)	311	181
Markus Barth	16 June 2000 (aged 19)	370	694

=== Portugal ===
Name	DoB/Age	MS Rank	MD Rank
Bernardo Atilano	19 June 1996 (aged 23)	138	-
Tomas Nero	1 December 1992 (aged 27)	–	316
Daniel Mendes	13 April 1997 (aged 22)	–	1033
Duarte Nuno Anjo	5 April 1996 (aged 23)	259	942
Bruno Carvalho	1 October 1994 (aged 25)	348	316
Rodrigo Almeida	29 August 2001 (aged 18)	–	-
Joao Chang	8 October 2001 (aged 18)	–	-
Tomas Coelho	16 April 2000 (aged 19)	–	-
Diogo Gloria	19 April 2002 (aged 17)	–	-
Kevin Selvarajah	28 January 2000 (aged 20)	–	-

=== Slovenia ===
Name	DoB/Age	MS Rank	MD Rank
Tilen Zalar	16 January 1998 (aged 22)	–	1418
Andraž Krapež	12 January 1997 (aged 23)	317	664
Jaka Ivančič	19 November 2001 (aged 18)	1231	342
Miha Ivančič	5 October 1998 (aged 21)	555	670
Gasper Krivec	24 January 1999 (aged 21)	1274	670
Rok Jercinovic	11 March 1998 (aged 21)	–	-

=== Ukraine ===
Name	DoB/Age	MS Rank	MD Rank
Artem Pochtarov	24 July 1993 (aged 26)	86	-
Danylo Bosniuk	23 August 2000 (aged 19)	183	-
Gennadiy Natarov	23 January 1992 (aged 28)	–	449
Glib Beketov	30 October 2000 (aged 19)	415	115
Mykhaylo Makhnovskiy	19 February 2000 (aged 19)	753	115
Ivan Druzchenko	27 August 1997 (aged 22)	1257	140
Oleksandr Kolesnik	10 March 1997 (aged 22)	1047	140
Valeriy Atrashchenkov	20 August 1984 (aged 35)	1490	694
Dmytro Zavadsky	4 November 1988 (aged 31)	–	-

== Group 8 ==
Group 8 consists of Spain, Bulgaria, Croatia, Israel, and Italy.

=== Spain ===
Name	DoB/Age	MS Rank	MD Rank
Pablo Abián	12 June 1985 (aged 34)	50	-
Luís Enrique Peñalver	9 February 2001 (aged 19)	82	-
Alvaro Vazquez	11 March 1999 (aged 20)	251	-
Alejandro Alcalá	24 September 1999 (aged 20)	336	-
Alberto Zapico	30 January 1993 (aged 27)	–	675
Joan Monroy	26 February 2001 (aged 18)	1010	250
Carlos Piris	12 December 1993 (aged 26)	802	250
Marc Cardona	27 November 2001 (aged 18)	421	1362
Manuel Vazquez	28 November 1995 (aged 24)	596	675
Tomas Toledano	8 March 2001 (aged 18)	764	613

=== Bulgaria ===
Name	DoB/Age	MS Rank	MD Rank
Iliyan Stoynov	25 January 2001 (aged 19)	434	-
Alex Vlaar	31 July 1996 (aged 23)	–	154
Dimitar Yanakiev	5 November 1998 (aged 21)	186	154
Daniel Nikolov	26 August 1998 (aged 21)	174	176
Ivan Rusev	6 May 1993 (aged 26)	200	176
Peyo Boichinov		490	310
Stilian Makarski	18 March 1985 (aged 34)	1140	310

=== Croatia ===
Name	DoB/Age	MS Rank	MD Rank
Zvonimir Đurkinjak	2 June 1988 (aged 31)	137	-
Igor Čimbur	23 June 1989 (aged 30)	–	972
Filip Špoljarec	1 May 1994 (aged 25)	368	664
Luka Ban	24 June 2001 (aged 18)	772	1237
Zvonimir Hölbling	3 August 1989 (aged 30)	–	-

=== Israel ===
Name	DoB/Age	MS Rank	MD Rank
Misha Zilberman	25 January 1989 (aged 31)	45	-
Ariel Shainski	2 April 1993 (aged 26)	–	972
Yonathan Levit	15 November 1997 (aged 22)	290	694
Ofir Belenki	5 June 1999 (aged 20)	1042	439
Shoni Schwartzman	9 May 1998 (aged 21)	1042	439
May Bar Netzer	5 April 2000 (aged 19)	461	647
Maxim Grinblat	3 March 2001 (aged 18)	1003	647

=== Italy ===
Name	DoB/Age	MS Rank	MD Rank
Kevin Strobl	26 August 1997 (aged 22)	–	139
Gianmarco Bailetti	3 May 1999 (aged 20)	–	205
David Salutt	31 December 1998 (aged 21)	–	205
Giovanni Greco	11 April 1990 (aged 29)	765	139
Fabio Caponio	26 March 1999 (aged 20)	152	640
Enrico Baroni	20 May 2001 (aged 18)	573	1362
Giovanni Toti	28 December 2000 (aged 19)	613	640
