= 2012–13 European Badminton Circuit season =

The 2012–13 European Badminton Circuit season started in May 2012 and ended in April 2013.

== Results ==
=== Winners ===
Circuit	Men's singles	Women's singles	Men's doubles	Women's doubles	Mixed doubles
Denmark International	(Sweden) Henri Hurskainen	(Denmark) Sandra-Maria Jensen	(Denmark) Christian Skovgaard (Denmark) Mads Pieler Kolding	(Denmark) Line Damkjær Kruse (Denmark) Marie Røpke	(Denmark) Mads Pieler Kolding (Denmark) Julie Houmann
Slovenian International	(England) Andrew Smith	(Switzerland) Nicole Schaller	(Croatia) Zvonimir Đurkinjak (Croatia) Zvonimir Hölbling	(Germany) Isabel Herttrich (Germany) Inken Wienefeld	(Croatia) Zvonimir Đurkinjak (Croatia) Staša Poznanović
Spanish International	(France) Brice Leverdez	(Thailand) Salakjit Ponsana	(Netherlands) Jorrit de Ruiter (Netherlands) Dave Khodabux	(Russia) Tatjana Bibik (Russia) Anastasia Chervaykova	(England) Marcus Ellis (England) Gabrielle White
Bulgarian Open	(Malaysia) Tan Chun Seang	(Belarus) Alesia Zaitsava	(Malaysia) Tan Chun Seang (Austria) Roman Zirnwald	(Bulgaria) Gabriela Stoeva (Bulgaria) Stefani Stoeva	(Austria) Roman Zirnwald (Austria) Elisabeth Baldauf
St. Petersburg White Nights	(Ukraine) Dmytro Zavadsky	(Poland) Kamila Augustyn	(France) Baptiste Careme (France) Gaëtan Mittelheisser	(Russia) Tatjana Bibik (Russia) Anastasia Chervaykova	(France) Baptiste Careme (France) Audrey Fontaine
Polish International	(Scotland) Kieran Merrilees	(Scotland) Kirsty Gilmour	(Poland) Łukasz Moreń (Poland) Wojciech Szkudlarczyk	(Poland) Kamila Augustyn (Poland) Agnieszka Wojtkowska	(England) Andrew Ellis (badminton) (England) Jenny Wallwork
Slovak International	(Slovenia) Iztok Utroša	(Belarus) Alesia Zaitsava	(Wales) Nic Strange (Wales) Joe Morgan	(Ukraine) Yuliya Kazarinova (Ukraine) Yelyzaveta Zharka	(Czech Republic) Jakub Bitman (Czech Republic) Alžběta Bášová
Belgian International	(Indonesia) Andre Kurniawan Tedjono	(France) Sashina Vignes Waran	(Poland) Adam Cwalina (Netherlands) Koen Ridder	(Netherlands) Selena Piek (Netherlands) Iris Tabeling	(England) Marcus Ellis (England) Gabrielle White
Kharkiv International	(Denmark) Emil Holst	(Russia) Evgeniya Kostetskaya	(France) Baptiste Careme (France) Gaëtan Mittelheisser	(France) Audrey Fontaine (France) Émilie Lefel	(Sweden) Nico Ruponen (Sweden) Amanda Högström
Czech International	(Denmark) Joachim Persson	(Scotland) Kirsty Gilmour	(England) Chris Langridge (England) Peter Mills	(England) Heather Olver (England) Kate Robertshaw	(England) Chris Langridge (England) Heather Olver
Bulgarian International	(Lithuania) Kęstutis Navickas	(Bulgaria) Petya Nedelcheva	(Scotland) Robert Blair (Malaysia) Tan Bin Shen	(Bulgaria) Gabriela Stoeva (Bulgaria) Stefani Stoeva	(Germany) Michael Fuchs (Germany) Birgit Michels
Irish International	(Sweden) Mattias Wigardt	(France) Perrine Le Buhanic	(Wales) Daniel Font (Wales) Oliver Gwilt	(Republic of Ireland) Sinead Chambers (Republic of Ireland) Jennie King	(Republic of Ireland) Edward Cousins (Republic of Ireland) Keelin Fox
Swiss International	(Germany) Dieter Domke	(Scotland) Kirsty Gilmour	(Poland) Adam Cwalina (Poland) Przemyslaw Wacha	(England) Heather Olver (England) Kate Robertshaw	(Germany) Peter Käsbauer (Germany) Isabel Herttrich
Hungarian International	(Russia) Vladimir Malkov	(Ukraine) Marija Ulitina	(Netherlands) Ruud Bosch (Netherlands) Jim Middelburg	(Germany) Carola Bott (Croatia) Staša Poznanović	(Croatia) Zvonimir Đurkinjak (Croatia) Staša Poznanović
Iceland International	(Chinese Taipei) Chou Tien-chen	(Chinese Taipei) Chiang Mei-Hui	(Wales) Nic Strange (Wales) Joe Morgan	(South Korea) Lee So-hee (South Korea) Shin Seung-chan	(Chinese Taipei) Chou Tien-chen (Chinese Taipei) Chiang Mei-Hui
Norwegian International	(Chinese Taipei) Chou Tien-chen	(France) Sashina Vignes Waran	(Netherlands) Ruud Bosch (Netherlands) Koen Ridder	(Netherlands) Samantha Barning (Netherlands) Eefje Muskens	(Netherlands) Jorrit de Ruiter (Netherlands) Samantha Barning
Scottish Open	(India) Anand Pawar	(Japan) Sayaka Takahashi	(Japan) Takeshi Kamura (Japan) Keigo Sonoda	(Japan) Naoko Fukuman (Japan) Kurumi Yonao	(England) Marcus Ellis (England) Gabrielle White
Welsh International	(Chinese Taipei) Chou Tien-chen	(Chinese Taipei) Chiang Mei-Hui	(England) Marcus Ellis (Scotland) Paul van Rietvelde	(England) Lauren Smith (England) Gabrielle White	(England) Marcus Ellis (England) Gabrielle White
Irish Open	(Republic of Ireland) Scott Evans	(Denmark) Line Kjaersfeldt	(Netherlands) Jacco Arends (Netherlands) Jelle Maas	(Netherlands) Samantha Barning (Netherlands) Eefje Muskens	(Netherlands) Jorrit de Ruiter (Netherlands) Samantha Barning
Turkey International	(Russia) Dmytro Zavadsky	(Republic of Ireland) Chloe Magee	(Scotland) Robert Blair (Malaysia) Tan Bin Shen	(Bulgaria) Gabriela Stoeva (Bulgaria) Stefani Stoeva	(Republic of Ireland) Sam Magee (Republic of Ireland) Chloe Magee
Estonian International	(Japan) Kento Momota	(Denmark) Line Kjaersfeldt	(France) Laurent Constantin (France) Matthieu Lo Ying Ping	(Russia) Irina Hlebko (Russia) Ksenia Polikarpova	(Finland) Anton Kaisti (Finland) Jenny Nyström
Swedish International	(Japan) Kento Momota	(Spain) Carolina Marín	(Netherlands) Jacco Arends (Netherlands) Jelle Maas	(Netherlands) Selena Piek (Netherlands) Iris Tabeling	(Germany) Peter Käsbauer (Germany) Isabel Herttrich
Cyprus International	(Republic of Ireland) Scott Evans	(Bulgaria) Linda Zechiri	(Wales) Nic Strange (Wales) Joe Morgan	(Wales) Sarah Thomas (Wales) Carissa Turner	(Wales) Oliver Gwilt (Wales) Sarah Thomas
Austrian International	(Japan) Kento Momota	(Japan) Yui Hashimoto	(Japan) Hiroyuki Saeki (Japan) Ryota Taohata	(Japan) Misato Aratama (Japan) Megumi Taruno	(Hong Kong) Chan Yun Lung (Hong Kong) Tse Ying Suet
Romanian International	(Japan) Takuto Inoue	(Spain) Beatriz Corrales	(Japan) Takuto Inoue (Japan) Yuki Kaneko	(Russia) Irina Hlebko (Russia) Ksenia Polikarpova	(South Korea) Choi Sol-gyu (South Korea) Hye Rin Kim
Polish Open	(Russia) Vladimir Malkov	(Japan) Yui Hashimoto	(Poland) Adam Cwalina (Poland) Przemyslaw Wacha	(Japan) Yu Wakita (Japan) Rie Eto	(Poland) Robert Mateusiak (Poland) Nadieżda Zięba
French International	(England) Rajiv Ouseph	(Spain) Beatriz Corrales	(Poland) Adam Cwalina (Poland) Przemyslaw Wacha	(Japan) Yu Wakita (Japan) Rie Eto	(Scotland) Robert Blair (Scotland) Imogen Bankier
Finnish International	(England) Rajiv Ouseph	(Spain) Carolina Marín	(Malaysia) Nelson Heg Wei Keat (Malaysia) Teo Ee Yi	(Scotland) Imogen Bankier (Bulgaria) Petya Nedelcheva	(Denmark) Anders Skaarup Rasmussen (Denmark) Lena Grebak
Croatian International	(Indonesia) Wisnu Haryo Putro	(Russia) Natalia Perminova	(Indonesia) Christopher Rusdianto (Indonesia) Tri Kusuma Wardana	(Russia) Irina Hlebko (Russia) Ksenia Polikarpova	(Denmark) Niclas Nohr (Denmark) Rikke S. Hansen
Dutch International	(Denmark) Viktor Axelsen	(Spain) Beatriz Corrales	(Poland) Łukasz Moreń (Poland) Wojciech Szkudlarczyk	(Japan) Yu Wakita (Japan) Rie Eto	(Germany) Michael Fuchs (Germany) Birgit Michels
Portugal International	(Malaysia) Misbun Ramdan Misbun	(Russia) Ella Diehl	(Denmark) Anders Skaarup Rasmussen (Denmark) Kim Astrup Sorensen	(Denmark) Lena Grebak (Denmark) Maria Helsbol	(Germany) Jones Rafli Jansen (Indonesia) Keshya Nurvita Hanadia

=== Performance by countries ===
Tabulated below are the Circuit performances based on countries. Only countries who have won a title are listed:

No.	Team	DEN	SLO	ESP	BUL	RUS	POL	SVK	BEL	UKR	CZE	BUL	IRL	SWI	HUN	ISL	NOR	SCO	WLS	IRL	ITA	TUR	EST	SWE	CYP	AUT	ROM	POL	FRA	FIN	CRO	NED	POR	Total
1	England		1	1			1		1		3																							7
2	Denmark	4								1	1																							6
2	France			1		2			1	2																								6
4	Poland					1	2		1																									4
5	Netherlands			1					2																									3
5	Russia			1		1				1																								3
5	Scotland						2				1																							3
8	Austria				2																													2
8	Belarus				1			1																										2
8	Croatia		2																															2
8	Malaysia				2																													2
8	Sweden	1								1																								2
8	Ukraine					1		1																										2
14	Bulgaria				1																													1
14	Czech Republic							1																										1
14	Germany		1																															1
14	Indonesia								1																									1
14	Slovenia							1																										1
14	Switzerland		1																															1
14	Thailand			1																														1
14	Wales							1																										1
