= 2015 in badminton =

- January 8 – December 20: 2015 BWF Schedule of Events

== BWF Super Series ==
- March 3 – December 13: 2015 BWF Super Series
  - March 3 – 8: 2015 All England Super Series Premier in (United Kingdom) Birmingham
    - Men's Singles: (China) Chen Long
    - Men's Doubles: (Denmark) Mathias Boe / Carsten Mogensen
    - Women's Singles: (Spain) Carolina Marín
    - Women's Doubles: (China) Bao Yixin / Tang Yuanting
    - Mixed Doubles: (China) Zhang Nan / Zhao Yunlei
  - March 24 – 29: 2015 India Super Series in New Delhi
    - Men's Singles: (India) Srikanth Kidambi
    - Men's Doubles: (China) Chai Biao / Hong Wei
    - Women's Singles: (India) Saina Nehwal
    - Women's Doubles: (Japan) Misaki Matsutomo / Ayaka Takahashi
    - Mixed Doubles: (China) Liu Cheng / Bao Yixin
  - March 31 – April 5: 2015 Malaysia Super Series Premier in Kuala Lumpur
    - Men's Singles: (China) Chen Long
    - Men's Doubles: (Indonesia) Mohammad Ahsan / Hendra Setiawan
    - Women's Singles: (Spain) Carolina Marín
    - Women's Doubles: (China) Luo Ying / Luo Yu
    - Mixed Doubles: (China) Zhang Nan / Zhao Yunlei
  - April 7 – 12: 2015 Singapore Super Series in Singapore
    - Men's Singles: (Japan) Kento Momota
    - Men's Doubles: (Indonesia) Angga Pratama / Ricky Karanda Suwardi
    - Women's Singles: (China) SUN Yu
    - Women's Doubles: (China) OU Dongni / YU Xiaohan
    - Mixed Doubles: (China) Zhang Nan / Zhao Yunlei
  - May 26 – 31: 2015 Australian Super Series in (Australia) Sydney
    - Men's Singles: (China) Chen Long
    - Men's Doubles: (South Korea) Lee Yong-dae / Yoo Yeon-seong
    - Women's Singles: (Spain) Carolina Marín
    - Women's Doubles: (China) Ma Jin / Tang Yuanting
    - Mixed Doubles: (Hong Kong) Lee Chun Hei / Chau Hoi Wah
  - June 2 – 7: 2015 Indonesia Super Series Premier in Jakarta
    - Men's Singles: (Japan) Kento Momota
    - Men's Doubles: (South Korea) Ko Sung-hyun / Shin Baek-cheol
    - Women's Singles: (Thailand) Ratchanok Intanon
    - Women's Doubles: (China) Tang Jinhua / Tian Qing
    - Mixed Doubles: (China) Xu Chen / Ma Jin
  - September 8 – 13: 2015 Japan Super Series in Tokyo
    - Men's Singles: (China) Lin Dan
    - Men's Doubles: (South Korea) Lee Yong-dae / Yoo Yeon-seong
    - Women's Singles: (Japan) Nozomi Okuhara
    - Women's Doubles: (China) Zhao Yunlei / Zhong Qianxin
    - Mixed Doubles: (Denmark) Joachim Fischer Nielsen / Christinna Pedersen
  - September 15 – 20: 2015 Korea Open Super Series in (South Korea) Seoul
    - Men's Singles: (China) Chen Long
    - Men's Doubles: (South Korea) Lee Yong-dae / Yoo Yeon-seong
    - Women's Singles: (South Korea) Sung Ji-hyun
    - Women's Doubles: (Indonesia) Nitya Krishinda Maheswari / Greysia Polii
    - Mixed Doubles: (China) Zhang Nan / Zhao Yunlei
  - October 13 – 18: 2015 Denmark Super Series Premier in Odense
    - Men's Singles: (China) Chen Long
    - Men's Doubles: (South Korea) Lee Yong-dae / Yoo Yeon-seong
    - Women's Singles: (China) Li Xuerui
    - Women's Doubles: (South Korea) Jung Kyung-eun / Shin Seung-chan
    - Mixed Doubles: (South Korea) Ko Sung-hyun / Kim Ha-na
  - October 20 – 25: 2015 French Super Series in (France) Paris
    - Men's Singles: (Malaysia) Lee Chong Wei
    - Men's Doubles: (South Korea) Lee Yong-dae / Yoo Yeon-seong
    - Women's Singles: (Spain) Carolina Marín
    - Women's Doubles: (China) HUANG Yaqiong / Tang Jinhua
    - Mixed Doubles: (South Korea) Ko Sung-hyun / Kim Ha-na
  - November 10 – 15: 2015 China Open Super Series Premier in Fuzhou
    - Men's Singles: (Malaysia) Lee Chong Wei
    - Men's Doubles: (South Korea) Kim Gi-jung / Kim Sa-rang
    - Women's Singles: (China) Li Xuerui
    - Women's Doubles: (China) Tang Yuanting / Yu Yang
    - Mixed Doubles: (China) Zhang Nan / Zhao Yunlei
  - November 17 – 22: 2015 Hong Kong Super Series in Kowloon
    - Men's Singles: (Malaysia) Lee Chong Wei
    - Men's Doubles: (South Korea) Lee Yong-dae / Yoo Yeon-seong
    - Women's Singles: (Spain) Carolina Marín
    - Women's Doubles: (China) Tian Qing / Zhao Yunlei
    - Mixed Doubles: (China) Zhang Nan / Zhao Yunlei
  - December 9 – 13: 2015 BWF Super Series Masters Finals in (United Arab Emirates) Dubai
    - Men's Singles: (Japan) Kento Momota
    - Men's Doubles: (Indonesia) Mohammad Ahsan / Hendra Setiawan
    - Women's Singles: (Japan) Nozomi Okuhara
    - Women's Doubles: (China) Luo Ying / Luo Yu
    - Mixed Doubles: (England) Chris Adcock / Gabby Adcock

== BWF Grand Prix Gold and Grand Prix ==
- January 13 – December 20: 2015 BWF Grand Prix Gold and Grand Prix
  - January 13 – 18: 2015 Malaysia Open Grand Prix Gold in Kuching
    - Men's Singles: (South Korea) Lee Hyun-il
    - Men's Doubles: (Japan) Kenta Kazuno / Kazushi Yamada
    - Women's Singles: (Japan) Nozomi Okuhara
    - Women's Doubles: (Denmark) Christinna Pedersen / Kamilla Rytter Juhl
    - Mixed Doubles: (Denmark) Joachim Fischer Nielsen / Christinna Pedersen
  - January 20 – 25: 2015 India Open Grand Prix Gold in Lucknow
    - Men's Singles: (India) Parupalli Kashyap
    - Men's Doubles: (Denmark) Mathias Boe / Carsten Mogensen
    - Women's Singles: (India) Saina Nehwal
    - Women's Doubles: (Malaysia) Amelia Alicia Anscelly / Soong Fie Cho
    - Mixed Doubles: (Indonesia) Riky Widianto / Richi Puspita Dili
  - February 24 – March 1: 2015 German Open Grand Prix Gold in (Germany) Mülheim
    - Men's Singles: (Denmark) Jan Ø. Jørgensen
    - Men's Doubles: (Denmark) Mads Conrad-Petersen / Mads Pieler Kolding
    - Women's Singles: (South Korea) Sung Ji-hyun
    - Women's Doubles: (Denmark) Christinna Pedersen / Kamilla Rytter Juhl
    - Mixed Doubles: (Denmark) Mads Pieler Kolding / Kamilla Rytter Juhl
  - March 10 – 15: 2015 Swiss Open Grand Prix Gold in (Switzerland) Basel
    - Men's Singles: (India) Srikanth Kidambi
    - Men's Doubles: (China) Cai Yun / LU Kai
    - Women's Singles: (China) SUN Yu
    - Women's Doubles: (China) Bao Yixin / Tang Yuanting
    - Mixed Doubles: (China) LU Kai / HUANG Yaqiong
  - April 14 – 19: 2015 China Masters Grand Prix Gold (Bonny China Masters) in Changzhou
    - Men's Singles: (China) Wang Zhengming
    - Men's Doubles: (China) LI Junhui / LIU Yuchen
    - Women's Singles: (China) HE Bingjiao
    - Women's Doubles: (China) Tang Jinhua / Zhong Qianxin
    - Mixed Doubles: (China) LIU Cheng / Bao Yixin
  - April 28 – May 3: 2015 New Zealand Open Grand Prix in Auckland
    - Men's Singles: (South Korea) Lee Hyun-il
    - Men's Doubles: (China) HUANG Kaixiang / ZHENG Siwei
    - Women's Singles: (Japan) Saena Kawakami
    - Women's Doubles: (China) Xia Huan / Zhong Qianxin
    - Mixed Doubles: (China) ZHENG Siwei / CHEN Qingchen
  - June 16 – 21: 2015 U.S. Open Grand Prix Gold in (United States) New York City
    - Men's Singles: (Malaysia) Lee Chong Wei
    - Men's Doubles: (China) LI Junhui / LIU Yuchen
    - Women's Singles: (Japan) Nozomi Okuhara
    - Women's Doubles: (China) Yu Yang / Zhong Qianxin
    - Mixed Doubles: (China) HUANG Kaixiang / HUANG Dongping
  - June 23 – 28: 2015 Canada Open Grand Prix in Calgary
    - Men's Singles: (Malaysia) Lee Chong Wei
    - Men's Doubles: (China) LI Junhui / LIU Yuchen
    - Women's Singles: (Canada) Michelle Li
    - Women's Doubles: (India) Jwala Gutta / Ashwini Ponnappa
    - Mixed Doubles: (Hong Kong) Lee Chun Hei / Chau Hoi Wah
  - July 14 – 19: 2015 Chinese Taipei Open Grand Prix Gold in Taipei
    - Men's Singles: (China) Chen Long
    - Men's Doubles: (China) Fu Haifeng / Zhang Nan
    - Women's Singles: (China) Wang Yihan
    - Women's Doubles: (Indonesia) Nitya Krishinda Maheswari / Greysia Polii
    - Mixed Doubles: (South Korea) Ko Sung-hyun / Kim Ha-na
  - July 21 – 26: 2015 Russian Open in (Russia) Vladivostok
    - Men's Singles: (Indonesia) Tommy Sugiarto
    - Men's Doubles: (Russia) Vladimir Ivanov / Ivan Sozonov
    - Women's Singles: (Czech Republic) Kristína Gavnholt
    - Women's Doubles: (Bulgaria) Gabriela Stoeva / Stefani Stoeva
    - Mixed Doubles: (Malaysia) Chan Peng Soon / Goh Liu Ying
  - August 24 – 30: 2015 Vietnam Open Grand Prix in Ho Chi Minh City
    - Men's Singles: (Indonesia) Tommy Sugiarto
    - Men's Doubles: (China) LI Junhui / LIU Yuchen
    - Women's Singles: (Japan) Saena Kawakami
    - Women's Doubles: (Thailand) Jongkongphan Kittiharakul / Rawinda Prajongjai
    - Mixed Doubles: (China) HUANG Kaixiang / HUANG Dongping
  - September 29 – October 4: 2015 Thailand Open Grand Prix Gold in Bangkok
    - Men's Singles: (South Korea) Lee Hyun-il
    - Men's Doubles: (Indonesia) Wahyu Nayaka / Ade Yusuf
    - Women's Singles: (South Korea) Sung Ji-hyun
    - Women's Doubles: (China) HUANG Dongping / LI Yinhui
    - Mixed Doubles: (South Korea) CHOI Sol-gyu / Eom Hye-won
  - October 6 – 11: 2015 Dutch Open Grand Prix in (Netherlands) Almere
    - Men's Singles: (India) Ajay Jayaram
    - Men's Doubles: (Malaysia) Koo Kien Keat / Tan Boon Heong
    - Women's Singles: (Scotland) Kirsty Gilmour
    - Women's Doubles: (Bulgaria) Gabriela Stoeva / Stefani Stoeva
    - Mixed Doubles: (France) Ronan Labar / Emilie Lefel
  - October 13 – 18: 2015 Chinese Taipei Masters Grand Prix in Taipei
    - Men's Singles: (Indonesia) Sony Dwi Kuncoro
    - Men's Doubles: (Indonesia) Markus Fernaldi Gideon / Kevin Sanjaya Sukamuljo
    - Women's Singles: (South Korea) LEE Jang-mi
    - Women's Doubles: (Indonesia) Anggia Shitta Awanda / Ni Ketut Mahadewi Istirani
    - Mixed Doubles: (Indonesia) Ronald Alexander / Melati Daeva Oktaviani
  - October 27 – November 1: 2015 Bitburger Open Grand Prix Gold in (Germany) Saarbrücken
    - Men's Singles: (Hong Kong) Angus Ng Ka Long
    - Men's Doubles: (Denmark) Mads Conrad-Petersen / Mads Pieler Kolding
    - Women's Singles: (Japan) Akane Yamaguchi
    - Women's Doubles: (China) Tang Yuanting / Yu Yang
    - Mixed Doubles: (Poland) Robert Mateusiak / Nadieżda Zięba
  - November 3 – 8: 2015 Korea Open Grand Prix Gold in (South Korea) Jeonju
    - Men's Singles: (South Korea) LEE Dong-keun
    - Men's Doubles: (South Korea) Kim Gi-jung / Kim Sa-rang
    - Women's Singles: (Japan) Sayaka Sato
    - Women's Doubles: (South Korea) Chang Ye-na / Lee So-hee
    - Mixed Doubles: (South Korea) Ko Sung-hyun / Kim Ha-na
  - November 18 – 22: 2015 Scottish Open Grand Prix in (Scotland) Glasgow
    - Men's Singles: (Denmark) Hans-Kristian Vittinghus
    - Men's Doubles: (Germany) Michael Fuchs / Johannes Schöttler
    - Women's Singles: (Denmark) Line Kjaersfeldt
    - Women's Doubles: (Japan) Yuki Fukushima / Sayaka Hirota
    - Mixed Doubles: (Russia) Vitalij Durkin / Nina Vislova
  - November 24 – 29: Rio Grand Prix 2015 in Brazil (Olympic Test Event)
    - Men's Singles: (China) Lin Dan
    - Men's Doubles: (China) Huang Kaixiang / Zheng Siwei
    - Women's Singles: (China) Shen Yaying
    - Women's Doubles: (China) Chen Qingchen / Jia Yifan
    - Mixed Doubles: (China) Zheng Siwei / Chen Qingchen
  - November 24 – 29: 2015 Macau Open Grand Prix Gold
    - Men's Singles: (South Korea) JEON Hyeok-jin
    - Men's Doubles: (South Korea) Ko Sung-hyun / Shin Baek-cheol
    - Women's Singles: (India) P. V. Sindhu
    - Women's Doubles: (South Korea) Jung Kyung-eun / Shin Seung-chan
    - Mixed Doubles: (South Korea) Shin Baek-cheol / Chae Yoo-jung
  - December 1 – 6: 2015 Indonesia Masters Grand Prix Gold Malang
    - Men's Singles: (Indonesia) Tommy Sugiarto
    - Men's Doubles: (Indonesia) Berry Angriawan / Rian Agung Saputro
    - Women's Singles: (China) HE Bingjiao
    - Women's Doubles: (China) Tang Yuanting / Yu Yang
    - Mixed Doubles: (Indonesia) Tontowi Ahmad / Liliyana Natsir
  - December 7 – 12: 2015 K&D Graphics / Yonex Grand Prix in (United States) Orange, California
    - Men's Singles: (South Korea) Lee Hyun-il
    - Men's Doubles: (Malaysia) V Shem Goh / Wee Kiong Tan
    - Women's Singles: (Chinese Taipei) Pai Yu Po
    - Women's Doubles: (South Korea) Jung Kyung-eun / Shin Seung-chan
    - Mixed Doubles: (South Korea) Choi Sol-gyu / Eom Hye-won
  - December 15 – 20: 2015 Mexico City Grand Prix in Mexico (final)
    - Men's Singles: (South Korea) Lee Dong-keun
    - Men's Doubles: (India) Manu Attri / B. Sumeeth Reddy
    - Women's Singles: (Japan) Sayaka Sato
    - Women's Doubles: (Japan) Shizuka Matsuo / Mami Naito
    - Mixed Doubles: (Malaysia) Chan Peng Soon / Goh Liu Ying

== Other badminton events ==
- February 12 – 15: 2015 European Mixed Team Badminton Championships in (Belgium) Leuven
  - Winners: Denmark (Line Kjærsfeldt, Jan Ø. Jørgensen, Christinna Pedersen, Kamilla Rytter Juhl, Mads Conrad-Petersen, Mads Pieler Kolding, Joachim Fischer Nielsen)
- February 12 – 15: 2015 Oceania Badminton Championships in (New Zealand) Auckland
  - Men's Singles: (Australia) Daniel Guda
  - Men's Doubles: (Australia) Matthew Chau / Sawan Serasinghe
  - Women's Singles: (Australia) Hsuan-yu Wendy Chen
  - Women's Doubles: (Australia) Leanne Choo / Gronya Somerville
  - Mixed Doubles: (Australia) Robin Middleton / Leanne Choo
- February 12 – 15: 2015 X-TRM Oceania Junior Championships in (New Zealand) Auckland
  - Men's Junior Singles: (New Zealand) Oscar Guo
  - Men's Junior Doubles: (New Zealand) Niccolo Tagle / Daxxon Vong
  - Women's Junior Singles: (Australia) Alice Wu
  - Women's Junior Doubles: (Australia) Lee-Yen KHOO / Alice Wu
  - Mixed Junior Doubles: (Australia) Huaidong TANG / Lee-Yen KHOO
- March 26 – April 4: 2015 European Junior Badminton Championships in (Poland) Lubin
  - Men's Junior Singles: (Denmark) Anders Antonsen
  - Men's Junior Doubles: (Denmark) Alexander Bond / Joel Eipe
  - Women's Junior Singles: (Denmark) Mia Blichfeldt
  - Women's Junior Doubles: (Denmark) Julie Dawall Jakobsen / Ditte Søby Hansen
  - Mixed Junior Doubles: (Germany) Max Weißkirchen / Eva Janssens
- April 21 – 26: 2015 Badminton Asia Championships in (China) Wuhan
  - Men's Singles: (China) Lin Dan
  - Men's Doubles: (South Korea) Lee Yong-dae / Yoo Yeon-seong
  - Women's Singles: (Thailand) Ratchanok Intanon
  - Women's Doubles: (China) Ma Jin / TANG Yuanting
  - Mixed Doubles: (Indonesia) Tontowi Ahmad / Liliyana Natsir
- May 10 – 17: 2015 Sudirman Cup in Dongguan
  - Overall team winners: China (sixth consecutive Sudirman Cup titles; ten overall wins in total)
- June 10 – 14: 2015 European Club Badminton Championships in (France) Tours
  - (Russia) Primorye Vladivostok defeated (France) Aix Universite CB, 3–1 in matches played, to win their fourth consecutive and sixth overall European Club Badminton Championships title.
- June 28 – July 5: 2015 BAC Junior Asian Championships in (Thailand) Bangkok
  - Men's Junior Singles: (China) LIN Guipu
  - Men's Junior Doubles: (China) HE Jiting / ZHENG Siwei
  - Women's Junior Singles: (China) HE Bingjiao
  - Women's Junior Doubles: (China) DU Yue / LI Yinhui
  - Mixed Junior Doubles: (China) ZHENG Siwei / CHEN Qingchen
  - Mixed Junior Team: China
- August 2 – 9: 2015 Pan Am Junior Badminton Championships in (Mexico) Tijuana
  - Men's Junior Singles: (Canada) Jason Anthony Ho-Shue
  - Men's Junior Doubles: (Canada) Jason Anthony Ho-Shue / Jonathan Bing Tsan Lai
  - Women's Junior Singles: (Canada) OUYANG Qingzi
  - Women's Junior Doubles: (United States) Annie Xu / Kerry Xu
  - Mixed Junior Doubles: (Canada) Jason Anthony Ho-Shue / OUYANG Qingzi
  - Mixed Junior Team: United States
- August 10 – 16: 2015 BWF World Championships in (Indonesia) Jakarta
  - Men's Singles: (China) Chen Long
  - Men's Doubles: (Indonesia) Mohammad Ahsan / Hendra Setiawan
  - Women's Singles: (Spain) Carolina Marín
  - Women's Doubles: (China) Tian Qing / Zhao Yunlei
  - Mixed Doubles: (China) Zhang Nan / Zhao Yunlei
- September 8 – 13: 2015 Para-Badminton World Championships in (United Kingdom) Stoke Mandeville
  - For results, click here.
  - Website, click here.
- September 20 – 26: 2015 BWF World Senior Championships in (Sweden) Helsingborg
  - For detailed results, click here.
- November 4 – 15: 2015 BWF World Junior Championships in (Peru) Lima
  - Men's Singles: (Chinese Taipei) Chia Hung Lu
  - Men's Doubles: (China) HE Jiting / ZHENG Siwei
  - Women's Singles: (Malaysia) Jin Wei Goh
  - Women's Doubles: (China) CHEN Qingchen / JIA Yifan
  - Mixed Doubles: (China) ZHENG Siwei / CHEN Qingchen

== Minor badminton events ==
=== January BMT ===
- January 6–11: Granular Thailand International Challenge 2015 in Bangkok
  - Men's singles: (South Korea) Lee Hyun-il
  - Men's doubles: (South Korea) Chan Jun Bong/Duck Young Kim
  - Women's singles: (Thailand) Supanida Katethong
  - Women's doubles: (Thailand) Duanganong Aroonkesorn/Kunchala Voravichitchaikul
  - Mixed doubles: (South Korea) Choi Sol-kyu/Chae Yoo-jung
- January 8–11: Estonian International 2015 in (Estonia) Tallinn
  - Men's singles: (Finland) Anton Kaisti
  - Men's doubles: (France) Laurent Constantin/Matthieu Lo Ying Ping
  - Women's singles: (Russia) Olga Golovanova
  - Women's doubles: (Russia) Victoria Dergunova/Olga Morozova
  - Mixed doubles: (Denmark) Kasper Antonsen/Amanda Madsen
- January 15–18: Swedish Masters 2015 in (Sweden) Uppsala
  - Men's singles: (England) Rajiv Ouseph
  - Men's doubles: (Denmark) Anders Skaarup Rasmussen/Kim Astrup Sørensen
  - Women's singles: (Scotland) Kirsty Gilmour
  - Women's doubles: (Russia) Anastasia Chervyakova/Nina Vislova
  - Mixed doubles: (Netherlands) Jacco Arends/Selena Piek
- January 22–25: Iceland International 2015 in Reykjavík
  - Men's singles: (Czech Republic) Milan Ludík
  - Men's doubles: (Scotland) Martin Campbell/Patrick MacHugh
  - Women's singles: (Denmark) Mette Poulsen
  - Women's doubles: (Denmark) Lena Grebak/Maria Helsbol
  - Mixed doubles: (Denmark) Nicklas Mathiasen/Cecilie Bjergen
- January 27 – February 1: China International Challenge 2015 in Lingshui
  - Men's singles: (China) Qiao Bin
  - Men's doubles: (China) Wang Yilv/Wen Zhang
  - Women's singles: (Japan) Nozomi Okuhara
  - Women's doubles: (China) Ou Dongni/Xiaohan Yu
  - Mixed doubles: (China) Zheng Si Wei/Chen Qingchen

=== February BMT ===
- February 12–15: Iran Fajr International Challenge 2015 in Tehran
  - Men's singles: (Austria) David Obernosterer
  - Men's doubles: (Malaysia) Tai An Khang/Hong Kheng Yew
  - Women's singles: (Bulgaria) Linda Zechiri
  - Women's doubles: (Turkey) Özge Bayrak/Neslihan Yiğit
- February 18–21: Austrian Open 2015 in Vienna
  - Men's singles: (Hong Kong) Ng Ka Long
  - Men's doubles: (Indonesia) Fajar Alfian / Muhammad Rian Ardianto
  - Women's singles: (Hong Kong) Cheung Ngan Yi
  - Women's doubles: (Indonesia) Suci Rizki Andini / Maretha Dea Giovani
  - Mixed doubles: (Indonesia) Edi Subaktiar / Gloria Emanuelle Widjaja
- February 19–22: Uganda International 2015 in Lugogo
  - Men's singles: (South Africa) Jacob Maliekal
  - Men's doubles: (Czech Republic) Pavel Florián / Ondřej Kopřiva
  - Women's singles: (Turkey) Ebru Yazgan
  - Women's doubles: (India) N. Siki Reddy / Poorvisha Ram S.
  - Mixed doubles: (India) Tarun Kona / N. Siki Reddy
- February 19–22: I Peru International Series 2015 in Lima
  - Men's singles: (Guatemala) Kevin Cordón
  - Men's doubles: (Turkey) Emre Vural / Sİnan Zorlu
  - Women's singles: (Turkey) Cemre Fere
  - Women's doubles: (Brazil) Lohaynny Vicente / Luana Vicente
  - Mixed doubles: (Peru) Mario Cuba / Katherine Winder

=== March BMT ===
- March 5 – 8: 50th Portuguese International Championships in Caldas da Rainha
  - Men's singles: (Japan) Kazumasa Sakai
  - Men's doubles: (England) Peter Briggs / Tom Wolfenden
  - Women's singles: (Japan) Sayaka Takahashi
  - Women's doubles: (Japan) Ayane Kurihara / Naru Shinoya
  - Mixed doubles: (Sweden) Filip Michael Duwall Myhren / Emma Wengberg
- March 11 – 15: 3rd Mercosul International 2015 in Foz do Iguaçu
  - Men's singles: (Guatemala) Kevin Cordón
  - Men's doubles: (Belgium) Matijs Dierickx / Freek Golinski
  - Women's singles: (United States) Rong Schafer
  - Women's doubles: (Turkey) Özge Bayrak / Neslihan Yiğit
  - Mixed doubles: (United States) Phillip Chew / Jamie Subandhi
- March 12 – 15: Romanian International 2015 in Timișoara
  - Men's singles: (Indonesia) Adi Pratama
  - Men's doubles: (Croatia) Zvonimir Đurkinjak / Zvonimir Hölbling
  - Women's singles: (Belgium) Lianne Tan
  - Women's doubles: (England) Chloe Birch / Jenny Wallwork
  - Mixed doubles: (India) Tarun Kona / N. Siki Reddy
- March 17 – 22: Ciputra Hanoi - Yonex Sunrise Vietnam International Challenge 2015 in Hanoi
  - Men's singles: (Indonesia) Firman Abdul Kholik
  - Men's doubles: (Chinese Taipei) Lu Ching-Yao / Chieh Tien Tzu
  - Women's singles: (Japan) Kana Itō
  - Women's doubles: (Indonesia) Anggia Shitta Awanda / Mahadewi Istirani Ni Ketut
  - Mixed doubles: (Indonesia) Fran Kurniawan / Komala Dewi
- March 18 – 21: 41st Yonex Polish Open 2015 in Arłamów
  - Men's singles: (Malaysia) Liew Daren
  - Men's doubles: (Japan) Kenta Kazuno / Kazushi Yamada
  - Women's singles: (Germany) Karin Schnaase
  - Women's doubles: (India) Pradnya Gadre / N. Sikki Reddy
  - Mixed doubles: (Malaysia) Chan Peng Soon / Goh Liu Ying
- March 19 – 22: Jamaica International Series 2015 in Kingston
  - Men's singles: (Canada) Martin Giuffre
  - Men's doubles: (Guatemala) Jonathan Solis / Rodolfo Ramírez
  - Women's singles: (Turkey) Ebru Tunalı
  - Women's doubles: (Turkey) Cemre Fere / Ebru Tunalı
  - Mixed doubles: (Turkey) Ramazan Özturk / Neslihan Kılıç
- March 25 – 29: XVI Giraldilla 2015 in Havana
  - Men's singles: (Cuba) Osleni Guerrero
  - Men's doubles: (Italy) Giovanni Greco / Rosario Maddaloni
  - Women's singles: (Turkey) Ebru Tunali
  - Women's doubles: (Turkey) Cemre Fere / Ebru Tunalı
  - Mixed doubles: (Peru) Mario Cuba / Katherine Winder
- March 26 – 29: Orleans International 2015 in Orléans
  - Men's singles: (Ukraine) Dmytro Zavadsky
  - Men's doubles: (England) Matthew Nottingham / Harley Towler
  - Women's singles: (Denmark) Natalia Koch Rohde
  - Women's doubles: (Bulgaria) Gabriela Stoeva / Stefani Stoeva
  - Mixed doubles: (Denmark) Mathias Christiansen / Lena Grebak

=== April BMT ===
- April 1 – 5: Osaka International Challenge 2015 in Osaka
  - Men's singles: (South Korea) Hyeok Jin-jeon
  - Men's doubles: (Japan) Kenta Kazuno / Kazushi Yamada
  - Women's singles: (Japan) Sayaka Takahashi
  - Women's doubles: (China) CHEN Qingchen / JIA Yifan
  - Mixed doubles: (South Korea) KIM Duck-young / Eom Hye-won
- April 2 – 5: Finnish Open 2015 in Vantaa
  - Men's singles: (Russia) Vladimir Vadimovich Malkov
  - Men's doubles: (England) Andrew Ellis / Peter Mills
  - Women's singles: (Spain) Beatriz Corrales
  - Women's doubles: (England) Heather Olver / Lauren Smith
  - Mixed doubles: (Russia) Anatoliy Yartsev / Evgeniya Kosetskaya
- April 9 – 12: Victor Croatian International 2015 in Zagreb
  - Men's singles: (Netherlands) Eric Pang
  - Men's doubles: (England) Peter Briggs / Tom Wolfenden
  - Women's singles: (Russia) Elena Komendrovskaja
  - Women's doubles: (Denmark) Maiken Fruergaard / Camilla Martens
  - Mixed doubles: (Croatia) Zvonimir Đurkinjak / Mateja Cica
- April 14 – 19: USM International Series 2015 in Semarang
  - Men's singles: (Indonesia) Wisnu Yuli Prasetyo
  - Men's doubles: (Indonesia) Fajar Alfian / Muhammad Rian Ardianto
  - Women's singles: (Indonesia) Fitriani Fitriani
  - Women's doubles: (Indonesia) Gebby Ristiyani Imawan / Tiara Rosalia Nuraidah
  - Mixed doubles: (Indonesia) Irfan Fadhilah / Weni Anggraini
- April 16 – 19: 16th Victor Dutch International 2015 in Wateringen
  - Men's singles: (Denmark) Anders Antonsen
  - Men's doubles: (Denmark) Kasper Antonsen / Oliver Babic
  - Women's singles: (Belgium) Lianne Tan
  - Women's doubles: (Netherlands) Gayle Mahulette / Cheryl Seinen
  - Mixed doubles: (Denmark) Amanda Madsen / Kasper Antonsen
- April 22 – 26: XX Peru International 2015 in Lima
  - Men's singles: (France) Thomas Rouxel
  - Men's doubles: (Poland) Adam Cwalina / Przemysław Wacha
  - Women's singles: (United States) Rong Schafer
  - Women's doubles: (France) Delphine Lansac / Emilie Lefel
  - Mixed doubles: (France) Ronan Labar / Emilie Lefel
- April 30 – May 3: Hellas International 2015 in Sidirokastro
  - Men's singles: (Germany) Fabian Roth
  - Men's doubles: (Poland) Milosz Bochat / Pawel Pietryja
  - Women's singles: (England) Fontaine Mica Chapman
  - Women's doubles: (Belgium) Steffi Annys / Flore Vandenhoucke
  - Mixed doubles: (Russia) Iiya Zdanov / Tatjana Bibik
- April 30 – May 3: Chile International 2015 in Temuco
  - Men's singles: (Cuba) Osleni Guerrero
  - Men's doubles: (Mexico) Job Castillo / Lino Munoz
  - Women's singles: (Hungary) Laura Sarosi
  - Women's doubles: (Brazil) Lohaynny Vicente / Luana Vicente
  - Mixed doubles: (Peru) Mario Cuba / Katherine Winder

=== May BMT ===
- May 5 – 10: Smiling Fish Thailand International Series 2015 in Trang, Thailand
  - Men's singles: (Indonesia) André Marteen
  - Men's doubles: (Thailand) Wannawat Ampunsuwan / Tinn Isriyanate
  - Women's singles: (Thailand) Supanida Katethong
  - Women's doubles: (Thailand) Supanida Katethong / Panjarat Pransopon
  - Mixed doubles: (Thailand) Parinyawat Thongnuam / Phataimas Muenwong
- May 7 – 10: Slovenia International 2015 in Medvode
  - Men's singles: (Ukraine) Dmytro Zavadsky
  - Men's doubles: (Croatia) Zvonimir Đurkinjak / Zvonimir Hölbling
  - Women's singles: (Ukraine) Marija Ulitina
  - Women's doubles: (Germany) Linda Efler / Lara Kaepplein
  - Mixed doubles: (France) Bastian Kersaudy / Lea Palermo
- May 21 – 24: Trinidad & Tobago International 2015 in Saint Augustine, Trinidad and Tobago
  - Men's singles: (Canada) Martin Giuffre
  - Men's doubles: (Mexico) Luis Ramon Garrido / Lino Munoz
  - Women's singles: (Austria) Elisabeth Baldauf
  - Women's doubles: (Mexico) Haramara Gaitan / Sabrina Solis
  - Mixed doubles: (Austria) David Obernosterer / Elisabeth Baldauf
- May 21 – 24: XXVIII Spanish International 2015 in Madrid
  - Men's singles: (Spain) Pablo Abián
  - Men's doubles: (Poland) Adam Cwalina / Przemysław Wacha
  - Women's singles: (United States) Iris Wang
  - Women's doubles: (Bulgaria) Gabriele Stoeva / Stefani Stoeva
  - Mixed doubles: (Germany) Marvin Emil Seidel / Linda Efler

=== June BMT ===
- Note 1: There was a badminton event, from June 9 – 14, that was cancelled.
- Note 2: There was another badminton event, from June 18 – 21, that was cancelled as well.
- June 2 – 6: Sri Lanka International Challenge 2015 in Colombo
  - Men's singles: (India) Sai Praneeth B.
  - Men's doubles: (Malaysia) Koo Kien Keat / Boon Heong Tan
  - Women's singles: (Thailand) Supanida Katethong
  - Women's doubles: (Thailand) Chaladchalam Chayanit / Phataimas Muenwong
  - Mixed doubles: (India) Arun Vishnu / Aparna Balan
- June 3 – 7: Santo Domingo Open 2015 in the Dominican Republic
  - Men's singles: (Austria) David Obernosterer
  - Men's doubles: (Mexico) Job Castillo / Lino Munoz
  - Women's singles: (Austria) Elisabeth Baldauf
  - Women's doubles: (Peru) Katherine Winder / Luz Maria Zornoza
  - Mixed doubles: (Austria) David Obernosterer / Elisabeth Baldauf
- June 11 – 14: Yonex Mauritius International 2015 in Beau-Bassin Rose-Hill
  - Men's singles: (Guatemala) Kevin Cordón
  - Men's doubles: (India) Shlok Ramchandran / Sanyam Shukla
  - Women's singles: (Finland) Nanna Vainio
  - Women's doubles: (Iran) Negin Amiripour / Aghaei Hajiagha Soraya
  - Mixed doubles: (South Africa) Andries Malan / Jennifer Fry

=== July BMT ===
- July 1 – 5: White Nights 2015 in Gatchina
  - Men's singles: (Russia) Vladimir Vadimovich Malkov
  - Men's doubles: (Malaysia) Koo Kien Keat / Boon Heong Tan
  - Women's singles: (Vietnam) Thi Trang Vu
  - Women's doubles: (Russia) Ekaterina Bolotova / Evgeniya Kosetskaya
  - Mixed doubles: (Republic of Ireland) Sam Magee / Chloe Magee
- July 7 – 12: Condensate Apacs Kazakhstan International Series 2015 in Uralsk
  - Men's singles: (Russia) Vladimir Vadimovich Malkov
  - Men's doubles: (Malaysia) Ming Chuen Lim / Wei Khoon Ong
  - Women's singles: (Russia) Evgeniya Kosetskaya
  - Women's doubles: (Russia) Tatjana Bibik / Ksenia Polikarpova
  - Mixed doubles: (Russia) Anatoliy Yartsev / Evgeniya Kosetskaya
- July 15 – 18: Lagos International 2015 in Nigeria
  - Men's singles: (India) Sai Praneeth B.
  - Men's doubles: (India) Manu Attri / B. Sumeeth Reddy
  - Women's singles: (Czech Republic) Kristína Gavnholt
  - Women's doubles: (India) Pradnya Gadre / N. Siki Reddy
  - Mixed doubles: (Poland) Robert Mateusiak / Nadieżda Zięba

=== August BMT ===
- August 17 – 20: Eurasia Bulgaria International in Sofia
  - Men's singles: (Estonia) Raul Must
  - Men's doubles: (France) Jordan Corvee / Julien Maio
  - Women's singles: (Denmark) Natalia Koch Rohde
  - Women's doubles: (Vietnam) Thu Huyen Le / Nhu Thao Pham
  - Mixed doubles: (Vietnam) Tuan Duc Do / Nhu Thao Pham
- August 18 – 22: OUE Singapore International Series 2015 in Singapore
  - Men's singles: (Malaysia) Iskandar Zulkarnain Zainuddin
  - Men's doubles: (Singapore) Yong Kai Terry Hee / Kean Hean Loh
  - Women's singles: (Indonesia) Gregoria Mariska Tunjung
  - Women's doubles: (Indonesia) Apriani Apriani / Jauza Fadhila Sugiarto
  - Mixed doubles: (Indonesia) Hafiz Faisal / Shella Devi Aulia
- August 20 – 23: I.B.B. Turkish International 2015 in Istanbul
  - Men's singles: (Belgium) Yuhan Tan
  - Men's doubles: (Hungary) Gergely Krausz / (Thailand) Tovannakasem Samatcha
  - Women's singles: (Estonia) Kati Tolmoff
  - Women's doubles: (Turkey) Kader İnal / Fatma Nur Yavuz
  - Mixed doubles: (Turkey) Melih Turgut / Fatma Nur Yavuz

=== September BMT ===
- September 1 – 6: Victor Indonesia International Challenge 2015 in Surabaya
  - Men's singles: (Indonesia) Sony Dwi Kuncoro
  - Men's doubles: (Indonesia) Berry Angriawan / Rian Agung Saputro
  - Women's singles: (Indonesia) Gregoria Mariska Tunjung
  - Women's doubles: (Indonesia) Gebby Ristiyani Imawan / Tiara Rosalia Nuraidah
  - Mixed doubles: (Indonesia) Fran Kurniawan / Komala Dewi
- September 2 – 6: Guatemala International Challenge 2015 in Guatemala City
  - Men's singles: (Guatemala) Kevin Cordón
  - Men's doubles: (Germany) Michael Fuchs / Johannes Schöttler
  - Women's singles: (United States) Rong Schafer
  - Women's doubles: (Germany) Johanna Goliszewski / Carla Nelte
  - Mixed doubles: (Germany) Michael Fuchs / Birgit Michels
- September 3 – 6: Babolat Kharkiv International 2015 in Kharkiv
  - Men's singles: (Sweden) Henri Hurskainen
  - Men's doubles: (Thailand) Bodin Issara / Nipitphon Puangpuapech
  - Women's singles: (Germany) Olga Konon
  - Women's doubles: (Thailand) Jongkongphan Kittiharakul / Rawinda Prajongjai
  - Mixed doubles: (Poland) Robert Mateusiak / Nadieżda Zięba
- September 9 – 12: Yonex Belgian International 2015 in Leuven
  - Men's singles: (Denmark) Anders Antonsen
  - Men's doubles: (India) Manu Attri / B. Sumeeth Reddy
  - Women's singles: (Malaysia) GOH Jin Wei
  - Women's doubles: (Denmark) Maiken Fruergaard / Sara Thygesen
  - Mixed doubles: (Poland) Robert Mateusiak / Nadieżda Zięba
- September 9 – 13: VI Internacional Mexicano 2015 in Cancún
  - Men's singles: (Spain) Ernesto Velazquez
  - Men's doubles: (Mexico) Job Castillo / Lino Munoz
  - Women's singles: (Portugal) Telma Santos
  - Women's doubles: (Brazil) Lohaynny Vicente / Luana Vicente
  - Mixed doubles: (Austria) David Obernosterer / Elisabeth Baldauf
- September 9 – 13: Auckland International 2015
  - Men's singles: (Chinese Taipei) LU Chia-hung
  - Men's doubles: (Malaysia) Darren Isaac Devadass / Vountus Indra Mawan
  - Women's singles: (Chinese Taipei) LEE Chia-hsin
  - Women's doubles: (Australia) Setyana Mapasa / Gronya Somerville
  - Mixed doubles: (Chinese Taipei) LEE Chia-han / LEE Chia-hsin
- September 16 – 20: 2015 Victor Maribyrnong International in Melbourne
  - Men's singles: (Chinese Taipei) LU Chia-hung
  - Men's doubles: (Malaysia) Darren Isaac Devadass / Vountus Indra Mawan
  - Women's singles: (Malaysia) Julia Wong Pei Xian
  - Women's doubles: (Australia) Setyana Mapasa / Gronya Somerville
  - Mixed doubles: (England) Robin Middleton / (Australia) Leanne Choo
- September 17 – 20: Polish International 2015 in Bieruń
  - Men's singles: (Malaysia) Iskandar Zulkarnain Zainuddin
  - Men's doubles: (Denmark) Kasper Antonsen / Niclas Nohr
  - Women's singles: (Malaysia) Ho Yen Mei
  - Women's doubles: (Sweden) Clara Nistad / Emma Wengberg
  - Mixed doubles: (Denmark) Kasper Antonsen / Amanda Madsen
- September 22 – 26: 2015 Sydney International
  - Men's singles: (Vietnam) Nguyễn Tiến Minh
  - Men's doubles: (Malaysia) Jagdish Singh / Wee Long Roni Tan
  - Women's singles: (Thailand) Pornpawee Chochuwong
  - Women's doubles: (Thailand) Jongkolphan Kititharakul / Rawinda Prajongjai
  - Mixed doubles: (England) Robin Middleton / (Australia) Leanne Choo
- September 22 – 26: Erdenet MC - Apacs International Series 2015 in Ulaanbaatar
  - Men's singles: (South Korea) LEE Cheol-ho
  - Men's doubles: (South Korea) KIM Dae-sung / KIM Young-sun
  - Women's singles: (South Korea) Soo Bin-lim
  - Women's doubles: (South Korea) KANG Ga-ae / LEE Ja-yeong
  - Mixed doubles: (South Korea) KIM Young-sun / LEE Ja-yeong
- September 23 – 26: FZ Forza Prague Badminton Open 2015
  - Men's singles: (Germany) Marc Zwiebler
  - Men's doubles: (Poland) Adam Cwalina / Przemysław Wacha
  - Women's singles: (Scotland) Kirsty Gilmour
  - Women's doubles: (Germany) Isabel Herttrich / Birgit Michels
  - Mixed doubles: (Russia) Vitalij Durkin / Nina Vislova
- September 23 – 27: VI Colombia International 2015 in Medellín
  - Men's singles: (United States) Bjorn Seguin
  - Men's doubles: (Brazil) Daniel Paiola / Alex Yuwan Tjong
  - Women's singles: (Switzerland) Jeanine Cicognini
  - Women's doubles: (Brazil) Ana Paula Campos / Fabiana Silva
  - Mixed doubles: (Brazil) Alex Yuwan Tjong / Fabiana Silva
- September 24 – 27: Ethiopia International 2015 in Addis Ababa
  - Men's singles: (Israel) Misha Zilberman
  - Men's doubles: (South Africa) Andries Malan / Willem Viljoen
  - Women's singles: (Turkey) Cemre Fere
  - Women's doubles: (Turkey) Cemre Fere / Ebru Yazgan
  - Mixed doubles: (Egypt) Ahmed Salah / Menna Eltanany
- September 30 – October 3: BABOLAT Bulgarian International 2015 in Sofia
  - Men's singles: (Spain) Pablo Abián
  - Men's doubles: (Germany) Raphael Beck / Peter Kaesbauer
  - Women's singles: (Germany) Olga Konon
  - Women's doubles: (Bulgaria) Gabriela Stoeva / Stefani Stoeva
  - Mixed doubles: (Poland) Robert Mateusiak / Nadieżda Zięba
- September 30 – October 3: Nigeria International 2015 in Abuja
  - Men's singles: (United States) Howard Shu
  - Men's doubles: (Turkey) Emre Vural / Sİnan Zorlu
  - Women's singles: (Nigeria) Grace Gabriel
  - Women's doubles: (Turkey) Cemre Fere / Ebru Yazgan
  - Mixed doubles: (Nigeria) Olorunfemi Elewa / Susan Ideh
- September 30 – October 4: Kawasaki Vietnam International Series 2015 in Da Nang
  - Men's singles: (Indonesia) Krishna Adi Nugraha
  - Men's doubles: (Indonesia) Hardianto Hardianto / Kenas Adi Haryanto
  - Women's singles: (Malaysia) GOH Jin Wei
  - Women's doubles: (Indonesia) Gebby Ristiyani Imawan / Tiara Rosalia Nuraidah
  - Mixed doubles: (Indonesia) Rian Swastedian / Masita Mahmudin

=== October BMT ===
- October 7 – 11: IV Argentina International 2015 in Neuquén
  - Men's singles: (United States) Bjorn Seguin
  - Men's doubles: (Mexico) Job Castillo / Lino Munoz
  - Women's singles: (Austria) Elisabeth Baldauf
  - Women's doubles: (Mexico) Haramara Gaitan / Sabrina Solis
  - Mixed doubles: (Austria) David Obernosterer / Elisabeth Baldauf
- October 14 – 18: Chile International Challenge 2015 in Temuco
  - Men's singles: (Spain) Pablo Abián
  - Men's doubles: (Canada) Adrian Liu / Derrick Ng
  - Women's singles: (Turkey) Özge Bayrak
  - Women's doubles: (United States) Eva Lee / Paula Lynn Obanana
  - Mixed doubles: (United States) Phillip Chew / Jamie Subandhi
- October 15 – 18: Swiss International 2015 in Yverodn-les-Bains
  - Men's singles: (Malaysia) Iskandar Zulkarnain Zainuddin
  - Men's doubles: (Malaysia) Koo Kien Keat / Tan Boon Heong
  - Women's singles: (Thailand) Nichaon Jindapon
  - Women's doubles: (Netherlands) Samantha Barning / Iris Tabeling
  - Mixed doubles: (Scotland) Robert Blair / (Indonesia) Pia Zebadiah Bernadeth
- October 21 – 25: 30th Brazil International Badminton Cup in São Paulo
  - Men's singles: (Brazil) Ygor Coelho de Oliveira
  - Men's doubles: (Mexico) Job Castillo / Lino Munoz
  - Women's singles: (Hungary) Laura Sarosi
  - Women's doubles: (Brazil) Lohaynny Vicente / Luana Vicente
  - Mixed doubles: (Brazil) Hugo Arthuso / Fabiana Silva
- October 22 – 25: 2015 Morocco International in Casablanca
  - Men's singles: (Portugal) Pedro Martins
  - Men's doubles: (Malaysia) Mohmed Misbun Misbun Shawal / Ridzwan Rahmat
  - Women's singles: (Belgium) Lianne Tan
  - Women's doubles: (Latvia) Ieva Pope / Kristine Sefere
  - Mixed doubles: (France) Vincent Espen / Manon Krieger
- October 28 – 31: New Caledonia International 2015 in Nouméa
  - Men's singles: (United States) Howard Shu
  - Men's doubles: (Australia) Anthony Joe / Pit Seng Low
  - Women's singles: (Italy) Jeanine Cicognini
  - Women's doubles: (New Caledonia) Johanna Kou / (New Zealand) Maria Masinipeni
  - Mixed doubles: (New Zealand) Shane Masinipeni / Maria Masinipeni
- October 28 – November 1: Bahrain International Series 2015 in Isa Town
  - Men's singles: (India) Sameer Verma
  - Men's doubles: (Malaysia) Wee Tat Tan / Yip Jiun Tan
  - Women's singles: (Malaysia) Li Lian Yang
  - Women's doubles: (India) S. Poorvisha Ram / Arathi Sara Sunil
  - Mixed doubles: (Malaysia) Yip Jiun Tan / Li Lian Yang
- October 29 – November 1: 40th Yonex Hungarian International 2015 in Budapest
  - Men's singles: (Finland) Kalle Koljonen
  - Men's doubles: (Scotland) Martin Campbell / Patrick Machugh
  - Women's singles: (Indonesia) Aprilia Yuswandari
  - Women's doubles: (Malaysia) Yee See Cheah / Kah Mun Chin
  - Mixed doubles: (England) Christopher Coles / Victoria Williams

=== November BMT ===
- November 3 – 7: Bahrain International Challenge 2015 in Isa Town
  - Men's singles: (India) Sameer Verma
  - Men's doubles: (Thailand) Bodin Issara / Nipitphon Puangpuapech
  - Women's singles: (Thailand) Nichaon Jindapon
  - Women's doubles: (Thailand) Savitree Amitrapai / Pacharapun Chochuwong
  - Mixed doubles: (Thailand) Bodin Issara / Savitree Amitrapai
- November 10 – 15: MAYBANK Malaysia International Challenge 2015 in Alor Setar
  - Men's singles: (Thailand) Khosit Phetpradab
  - Men's doubles: (Chinese Taipei) Lin Chia Yu / Hsiao-Lin Wu
  - Women's singles: (Singapore) Xiaoyu Liang
  - Women's doubles: (Indonesia) Della Destiara Haris / Rosyita Eka Putri Sari
  - Mixed doubles: (Thailand) Bodin Issara / Savitree Amitrapai
- November 11 – 15: Puerto Rico International 2015 in San Juan, Puerto Rico
  - Men's singles: (Guatemala) Kevin Cordón
  - Men's doubles: (Mexico) Job Castillo / Lino Munoz
  - Women's singles: (Hungary) Laura Sarosi
  - Women's doubles: (Mexico) Haramara Gaitan / Sabrina Solis
  - Mixed doubles: (Brazil) Alex Yuwan Tjong / Lohaynny Vicente
- November 12 – 15: Norwegian International Championships 2015 in Sandefjord
  - Men's singles: (Norway) Marius Myhre
  - Men's doubles: (Denmark) Soren Gravholt / Nikolaj Overgaard
  - Women's singles: (Denmark) Sofie Holmboe Dahl
  - Women's doubles: (Australia) Setyana Mapasa / Gronya Somerville
  - Mixed doubles: (Australia) Sawan Serasinghe / Setyana Mapasa
- November 18 – 21: IX Suriname International 2015 in Paramaribo
  - Men's singles: (Cuba) Osleni Guerrero
  - Men's doubles: (Mexico) Job Castillo / Lino Munoz
  - Women's singles: (Portugal) Telma Santos
  - Women's doubles: (Mexico) Haramara Gaitan / Sabrina Solis
  - Mixed doubles: (Germany) Jonathan Persson / (Brazil) Ana Paula Campos
- November 19 – 22: Yonex Finnish International Championships 2015 in Helsinki
  - Men's singles: (Denmark) Steffen Rasmussen
  - Men's doubles: (Russia) Nikita Khakimov / Vasily Kuznetsov
  - Women's singles: (Indonesia) Febby Angguni
  - Women's doubles: (Sweden) Clara Nistad / Emma Wengberg
  - Mixed doubles: (Sweden) Filip Michael Duwall Myhren / Emma Wengberg
- November 25 – 28: Yonex Welsh International Badminton Championships 2015 in Cardiff
  - Men's singles: (Russia) Vladimir Vadimovich Malkov
  - Men's doubles: (England) Marcus Ellis / Chris Langridge
  - Women's singles: (Denmark) Anna Thea Madsen
  - Women's doubles: (Bulgaria) Gabriela Stoeva / Stefani Stoeva
  - Mixed doubles: (England) Matthew Nottingham / Emily Westwood
- November 26 – 29: Zambia International 2015 in Lusaka
  - Men's singles: (Iran) Vatannejad-Soroush Eskandari
  - Men's doubles: (South Africa) Andries Malan / Willem Viljoen
  - Women's singles: (Mauritius) Kate Foo Kune
  - Women's doubles: (Egypt) Nadine Ashraf / Menna Eltanany
  - Mixed doubles: (Egypt) Abdelrahman Kashkal / Hadia Hosny

=== December BMT ===
- December 1 – 5: Bangladesh Open International Badminton Challenge 2015 in Dhaka
  - Men's singles: (India) B. Sai Praneeth
  - Men's doubles: (India) Pranav Chopra / Akshay Dewalkar
  - Women's singles: (India) Gadde Ruthvika Shivani
  - Women's doubles: (Thailand) Chaladchalam Chayanit / Phataimas Muenwong
  - Mixed doubles: (Singapore) Yong Kai Terry Hee / Wei Han Tan
- December 1 – 5: YONEX USA International 2015 in Orlando, Florida
  - Men's singles: (Denmark) Emil Holst
  - Men's doubles: (Chinese Taipei) Lin Chia Yu / Hsiao-Lin Wu
  - Women's singles: (United States) Zhang Beiwen
  - Women's doubles: (England) Heather Olver / Lauren Smith
  - Mixed doubles: (Germany) Michael Fuchs / Birgit Michels
- December 2 – 5: CARLTON IRISH OPEN 2015 in Dublin
  - Men's singles: (Denmark) Anders Antonsen
  - Men's doubles: (Germany) Raphael Beck / Peter Kaesbauer
  - Women's singles: (Germany) Olga Konon
  - Women's doubles: (Bulgaria) Gabriela Stoeva / Stefani Stoeva
  - Mixed doubles: (Denmark) Mathias Christiansen / Lena Grebak
- December 3 – 6: South Africa International 2015 in Cape Town
  - Men's singles: (United States) Howard Shu
  - Men's doubles: (Iran) Vatannejad-Soroush Eskandari / Farzin Khanjani
  - Women's singles: (Portugal) Telma Santos
  - Women's doubles: (Turkey) Cemre Fere / Ebru Yazgan
  - Mixed doubles: (South Africa) Andries Malan / Jennifer Fry
- December 8 – 11: YONEX Italian International 2015 in Milan
  - Men's singles: (France) Brice Leverdez
  - Men's doubles: (Denmark) Kasper Antonsen / Niclas Nohr
  - Women's singles: (Denmark) Natalia Koch Rohde
  - Women's doubles: (Bulgaria) Gabriela Stoeva / Stefani Stoeva
  - Mixed doubles: (Denmark) Niclas Nohr / Sara Thygesen
- December 9 – 13: TATA India International Challenge 2015 in Mumbai
  - Men's singles: (India) Sameer Verma
  - Men's doubles: (Thailand) Wannawat Ampunsuwan / Tinn Isriyanate
  - Women's singles: (Thailand) Pornpawee Chochuwong
  - Women's doubles: (Thailand) Chaladchalam Chayanit / Phataimas Muenwong
  - Mixed doubles: (India) Satwiksairaj Rankireddy / K. Maneesha
- December 10 – 13: Botswana International 2015 in Gaborone
  - Men's singles: (United States) Howard Shu
  - Men's doubles: (South Africa) Andries Malan / Willem Viljoen
  - Women's singles: (Hungary) Laura Sarosi
  - Women's doubles: (Nigeria) Grace Gabriel / (Zambia) Ogar Siamupangila
  - Mixed doubles: (Egypt) Abdelrahman Kashkal / Hadia Hosny
- December 17 – 20: Mersin Turkey International 2015 in Mersin
  - Men's singles: (Germany) Marc Zwiebler
  - Men's doubles: (Denmark) Kasper Antonsen / Niclas Nohr
  - Women's singles: (Germany) Karin Schnaase
  - Women's doubles: (Bulgaria) Gabriela Stoeva / Stefani Stoeva
  - Mixed doubles: (Poland) Robert Mateusiak / Nadieżda Zięba
