= Samatcha Tovannakasem =

Thai badminton player (born 1993)

Personal information
- Born: 11 March 1993 (age 33)

Sport
- Country: Thailand
- Sport: Badminton

Men's
- Highest ranking: 326 (MS) 13 October 2016; 113 (MD) 25 August 2016; 383 (XD) 11 July 2013
- BWF profile

Samatcha Tovannakasem (Thai: สมัชชา โตวรรณเกษม; born 11 March 1993) is a Thai male badminton player. In 2015, he won the Turkey International Series tournament in the men's doubles event partnered with Gergely Krausz of Hungary.

== Achievements ==
=== BWF International Challenge/Series (3 titles, 1 runner-up) ===
Men's Doubles
Year	Tournament	Partner	Opponent	Score	Result
2015	Turkey International	(Hungary) Gergely Krausz	(Iran) Ashkan Fesahati (Iran) Mohamad Reza Khanjani	121–6, 21–6	(gold) Winner
2017	Croatian International	(Croatia) Igor Čimbur	(Croatia) Zvonimir Durkinjak (Croatia) Zvonimir Hoelbling	17–21, 18–21	(silver) Runner-up
2017	Romanian International	(Slovenia) Andraz Krapez	(Bulgaria) Daniel Nikolov (Bulgaria) Ivan Rusev	21–15, 21–15	(gold) Winner
2024	Egypt International	(Thailand) Kittisak Namdash	(Algeria) Koceila Mammeri (Algeria) Youcef Sabri Medel	13–21, 21–18, 21–13	(gold) Winner

BWF International Challenge tournament
BWF International Series tournament
BWF Future Series tournament
