= Manon Kriéger =

French badminton player (born 1993)

Personal information
- Born: 25 September 1993 (age 33) Saint Maur, France
- Height: 1.66 m (5 ft 5 in)

Sport
- Country: France
- Sport: Badminton
- Handedness: Right

Women's singles & doubles
- Highest ranking: 146 (WS 19 October 2017); 254 (WD 30 October 2014); 161 (XD 28 April 2016)
- BWF profile

Manon Kriéger (born 25 September 1993) is a French badminton player. In 2015, she won the Morocco International tournament in the mixed doubles event partnered with Vincent Espen. In 2017, she and Espen reached the semifinals in the same tournament. She also reached the finals round in the women's singles event, but lost to Martina Repiska of Slovakia.

== Achievements ==
=== BWF International Challenge/Series ===
Women's singles
Year	Tournament	Opponent	Score	Result
2017	Morocco International	(Slovakia) Martina Repiska	19–21, 18–21	(silver) Runner-up

Women's doubles
Year	Tournament	Partner	Opponent	Score	Result
2018	Slovenian International	(France) Julie Ferrier	(Croatia) Katarina Galenić (Croatia) Maja Pavlinić	15–21, 10–21	(silver) Runner-up

Mixed doubles
Year	Tournament	Partner	Opponent	Score	Result
2015	Morocco International	(France) Vincent Espen	(Jordan) Bahaedeen Ahmad Alshannik (Jordan) Domou Amro	21–12, 18–21, 21–17	(gold) Winner

BWF International Challenge tournament
BWF International Series tournament
BWF Future Series tournament
