= Mariya Mitsova =

Bulgarian badminton player

Personal information
- Born: 21 November 1996 (age 29) Ruse, Bulgaria
- Height: 1.69 m (5 ft 7 in)
- Weight: 56 kg (123 lb)

Sport
- Country: Bulgaria
- Sport: Badminton

Women's singles & doubles
- Highest ranking: 63 (WS 2 November 2017); 29 (WD 13 April 2017); 60 (XD 13 August 2019)
- BWF profile
Medal record
Women's badminton
Representing Bulgaria
European Women's Team Championships
Gold medal – first place	2026 Istanbul	Women's team
Silver medal – second place	2016 Kazan	Women's team
Bronze medal – third place	2014 Basel	Women's team

Mariya Mitsova (Bulgarian: Мария Мицова; born 20 November 1996) is a Bulgarian badminton player. Mitsova represented her country at the 2014 Summer Youth Olympics in Nanjing, China. In 2016, she became the runner-up at the Croatian International tournament in the mixed doubles event partnered with Alex Vlaar. She won two titles at the Hellas International tournament in the women's singles and doubles event. She was part of the national team that won the silver medal at the 2016 European Women's Team Championships in Kazan, Russia.

== Achievements ==
=== BWF International Challenge/Series (12 titles, 8 runners-up) ===
Women's singles
Year	Tournament	Opponent	Score	Result
2016	Hellas International	(France) Olivia Meunier	21–7, 21–9	(gold) Winner
2017	Hellas Open	(Turkey) Neslihan Yiğit	14–21, 21–17, 15–21	(silver) Runner-up
2017	Bulgarian International	(Croatia) Maja Pavlinić	21–10, 21–3	(gold) Winner
2018	Croatian International	(Denmark) Iben Bergstein	22–20, 22–20	(gold) Winner
2018	Hungarian International	(Turkey) Neslihan Yiğit	14–21, 8–21	(silver) Runner-up
2019	Hellas International	(Austria) Katrin Neudolt	21–16, 21–8	(gold) Winner
2019	Bulgarian Open	(Turkey) Neslihan Yiğit	9–21, 14–21	(silver) Runner-up

Women's doubles
Year	Tournament	Partner	Opponent	Score	Result
2016	Hellas International	(Bulgaria) Petya Nedelcheva	(Germany) Annabella Jäger (Germany) Vanessa Seele	21–11, 21–9	(gold) Winner
2016	Bulgaria International	(Bulgaria) Petya Nedelcheva	(Turkey) Cemre Fere (Turkey) Neslihan Kılıç	15–21, 19–21	(silver) Runner-up
2016	Slovak Open	(Bulgaria) Petya Nedelcheva	(Ukraine) Vladyslava Lesnaya (Ukraine) Darya Samarchants	11–5, 11–4, 11–3	(gold) Winner
2016	Czech International	(Bulgaria) Petya Nedelcheva	(England) Lauren Smith (England) Sarah Walker	12–21, 18–21	(silver) Runner-up
2016	Hungarian International	(Bulgaria) Petya Nedelcheva	(Denmark) Gabriella Bøje (Denmark) Cecilie Sentow	11–6, 11–6, 11–5	(gold) Winner
2016	Italian International	(Bulgaria) Petya Nedelcheva	(Russia) Anastasia Chervyakova (Russia) Olga Morozova	18–21, 17–21	(silver) Runner-up
2017	Estonian International	(Bulgaria) Petya Nedelcheva	(France) Delphine Delrue (France) Léa Palermo	21–12, 21–16	(gold) Winner

Mixed doubles
Year	Tournament	Partner	Opponent	Score	Result
2016	Croatian International	(Bulgaria) Alex Vlaar	(Croatia) Zvonimir Đurkinjak (Croatia) Matea Čiča	18–21, 11–21	(silver) Runner-up
2018	Hellas International	(Bulgaria) Dimitar Yanakiev	(England) Michael Roe (England) Jessica Hopton	24–22, 21–14	(gold) Winner
2018	Bulgarian Open	(Bulgaria) Alex Vlaar	(Finland) Anton Kaisti (Finland) Inalotta Suutarinen	21–17, 17–21, 21–16	(gold) Winner
2018	Bulgarian International	(Bulgaria) Alex Vlaar	(India) Ashith Surya (India) Pranjal Prabhu Chimulkar	21–15, 21–10	(gold) Winner
2019	Portugal International	(Bulgaria) Alex Vlaar	(Chinese Taipei) Chang Ko-chi (Chinese Taipei) Lee Chih-chen	12–21, 14–21	(silver) Runner-up
2019	Hellas International	(Bulgaria) Alex Vlaar	(Poland) Miłosz Bochat (Poland) Magdalena Świerczyńska	10–21, 23–21, 21–17	(gold) Winner

BWF International Challenge tournament
BWF International Series tournament
BWF Future Series tournament
