= Igor Čimbur =

Croatian badminton player (born 1989)

Personal information
- Born: 23 June 1989 (age 37)

Sport
- Country: Croatia
- Sport: Badminton
- Handedness: Right

Men's
- Highest ranking: 352 (MS) 21 January 2010; 146 (MD) 21 January 2010; 260 (XD) 26 November 2015
- BWF profile

Igor Čimbur (born 23 June 1989) is a Croatian male badminton player who plays for the Medvedgrad 1998 and also Langenfeld badminton club in Germany. At the Croatian National Badminton Championships, he won the men's doubles title from 2009 to 2012 and in 2017 partnered with Zvonimir Hölbling, and in the mixed doubles in 2009 and 2017 with Matea Čiča. At the International event, he was the runner-up of the 2017 Croatian International tournament partnered with Samatcha Tovannakasem of Thailand.

== Achievements ==
=== BWF International Challenge/Series ===
Men's Doubles
Year	Tournament	Partner	Opponent	Score	Result
2017	Croatian International	(Thailand) Samatcha Tovannakasem	(Croatia) Zvonimir Đurkinjak (Croatia) Zvonimir Hoelbling	17–21, 18–21	(silver) Runner-up

BWF International Challenge tournament
BWF International Series tournament
BWF Future Series tournament
