= Maja Pavlinić =

Croatian badminton player (born 1997)

Personal information
- Born: 14 June 1997 (age 29)
- Height: 1.70 m (5 ft 7 in)
- Weight: 63 kg (139 lb)

Sport
- Country: Croatia
- Sport: Badminton
- Handedness: Right

Women's singles & doubles
- Highest ranking: 158 (WS 27 August 2015); 104 (WD 16 July 2019); 290 (XD 25 June 2015)
- BWF profile

Maja Pavlinić (born 14 June 1997) is a Croatian badminton player. Pavlinić trained at the BK Medvedgrad 1998 with coach Igor Čimbur. As a junior player, she was a girls' doubles gold medalist at the 2014 European U17 Championships, and in 2015, she claimed double titles at the Polish Junior International tournament in the girls' singles and doubles events. In the senior event, she was a champion at the 2018 Slovenian International in the women's doubles. She represented her country competed at the 2014 Summer Youth Olympics in Nanjing, China and 2019 Minsk European Games.

She educated political science at the Zagreb University.

== Achievements ==
=== BWF International Challenge/Series ===
Women's singles
Year	Tournament	Opponent	Score	Result
2017	Bulgarian International	(Bulgaria) Mariya Mitsova	10–21, 3–21	(silver) Runner-up

Women's doubles
Year	Tournament	Partner	Opponent	Score	Result
2013	Hatzor International	(Croatia) Dorotea Sutara	(Russia) Olga Golovanova (Russia) Viktoriia Vorobeva	19–21, 7–21	(silver) Runner-up
2018	Slovenian International	(Croatia) Katarina Galenić	(France) Julie Ferrier (France) Manon Kriéger	21–15, 21–10	(gold) Winner

BWF International Challenge tournament
BWF International Series tournament
BWF Future Series tournament
