= Andrea Jurčić =

Croatian badminton and volleyball player (born 1972)

Andrea Jurčić (born 21 June 1972) is a Croatian retired badminton and volleyball player.

In badminton, Jurčić is a nine-time Croatian singles champion, seven-time mixed doubles champion, and six-time doubles champion.

Her greatest success in volleyball was winning gold in the 1993 Mediterranean Games with the Croatian national team. Jurčić retired from competitive sport in 2000 and is currently a beach volleyball coach in Zagreb.

== Sources ==
- "Andrea Jurčić". badminton-zagreb.hr (in Croatian).
