= Andraž Krapež =

Slovenian badminton player (born 1997)

Personal information
- Born: 12 January 1997 (age 29)
- Height: 1.77 m (5 ft 10 in)
- Weight: 75 kg (165 lb)

Sport
- Country: Slovenia
- Sport: Badminton
- Coached by: Mišo Mattias

Men's singles & doubles
- Highest ranking: 223 (MS 13 August 2019); 113 (MD 21 December 2017)
- BWF profile
Medal record
Men's badminton
Representing Slovenia
Mediterranean Games
Bronze medal – third place	2022 Oran	Men's singles

Andraž Krapež (born 12 January 1997) is a Slovenian badminton player. He trained at the BIT badminton club, and in 2014 he competed at the Summer Youth Olympics in Nanjing, China. In 2017, he won his first international title at the Romanian International tournament in the men's doubles event partnered with Samatcha Tovannakasem of Thailand. Krapež was a bronze medalists at the 2022 Mediterranean Games.

== Achievements ==
=== Mediterranean Games ===
Men's singles
Year	Venue	Opponent	Score	Result	Ref.
2022	Multipurpose Omnisports Hall; Oued Tlélat, Algeria	(Spain) Luis Enrique Peñalver	6–21, 18–21	Bronze	

=== BWF International Challenge/Series (2 titles, 4 runners-up) ===
Men's singles
Year	Tournament	Opponent	Score	Result
2017	Slovak Open	(Scotland) Matthew Carder	15–21, 21–18, 24–22	(gold) Winner

Men's doubles
Year	Tournament	Partner	Opponent	Score	Result
2017	Romanian International	(Thailand) Samatcha Tovannakasem	(Bulgaria) Daniel Nikolov (Bulgaria) Ivan Rusev	21–15, 21–15	(gold) Winner
2017	Slovak Open	(Slovenia) Miha Ivanič	(Ukraine) Ivan Druzchenko (Ukraine) Vladislav Druzchenko	17–21, 21–17, 14–21	(silver) Runner-up
2017	Bulgarian International	(Slovenia) Miha Ivanič	(India) Arun George (India) Sanyam Shukla	18–21, 13–21	(silver) Runner-up
2018	Hatzor International	(Croatia) Filip Špoljarec	(Israel) Ariel Shainski (Czech Republic) Lukáš Zevl	21–15, 15–21, 16–21	(silver) Runner-up
2024	Slovak Open	(Switzerland) Yann Orteu	(Poland) Jakub Melaniuk (Poland) Wiktor Trecki	17–21, 22–24	(silver) Runner-up

BWF International Challenge tournament
BWF International Series tournament
BWF Future Series tournament
