= Katarina Galenić =

Croatian badminton player (born 1997)

Personal information
- Born: 23 May 1997 (age 29) Zagreb, Croatia
- Height: 1.67 m (5 ft 6 in)
- Weight: 55 kg (121 lb)

Sport
- Country: Croatia
- Sport: Badminton
- Handedness: Right

Women's singles & doubles
- Highest ranking: 217 (WS 19 March 2015); 267 (WD 7 June 2012); 292 (XD 17 July 2014)
- BWF profile

Katarina Galenić (born 23 May 1997) is a Croatian badminton player. She competed at the 2015 European Games in Baku, Azerbaijan.

== Achievements ==
=== BWF International Challenge/Series ===
Women's doubles
Year	Tournament	Partner	Opponent	Score	Result
2014	Slovak Open	(Netherlands) Cheryl Seinen	(Poland) Magdalena Witek (Poland) Aneta Wojtkowska	11–7, 11–9, 5–11, 11–7	(gold) Winner
2018	Slovenian International	(Croatia) Maja Pavlinić	(France) Julie Ferrier (France) Manon Kriéger	21–15, 21–10	(gold) Winner

BWF International Challenge tournament
BWF International Series tournament
BWF Future Series tournament
