= Wisnu Haryo Putro =

Italian badminton player (born 1989)

Personal information
- Born: 29 December 1989 (age 36) Pati Regency, Central Java, Indonesia

Sport
- Country: Italy
- Sport: Badminton

Men's singles & doubles
- Highest ranking: 92 (MS 13 September 2012); 109 (MD 1 March 2012); 288 (XD 7 June 2012)
- BWF profile
Medal record
Men's badminton
Representing Indonesia
Asian Junior Championships
Bronze medal – third place	2006 Kuala Lumpur	Mixed team

Wisnu Haryo Putro (born 29 December 1989) is an Italian badminton player. He originally represented Indonesia.

== Achievements ==
=== BWF International Challenge/Series ===
Men's singles

Year	Tournament	Opponent	Score	Result
2009	Slovak Open	(England) Ben Beckman	21–13, 17–21, 21–14	(gold) Winner
2010	Slovenia International	(Spain) Pablo Abián	14–21, 14–21	(silver) Runner-up
2010	Puerto Rico International	(Portugal) Pedro Martins	21–10 21–18	(gold) Winner
2012	Uganda International	(Sri Lanka) Niluka Karunaratne	11–21, 18–21	(silver) Runner-up
2013	Croatian International	(Sweden) Mathias Borg	19–21, 21–18, 25–23	(gold) Winner
2016	Croatian International	(Norway) Marius Myhre	21–14, 20–22, 13–21	(silver) Runner-up

BWF International Challenge tournament
BWF International Series tournament
BWF Future Series tournament
