= Croatian International =

Badminton championships

The Croatian International in badminton is an international open held in Croatia since 1999. The tournament belongs to the EBU Circuit as a BWF Future Series graded tournament. Croatian National Badminton Championships were established already in 1992. In 2022, the second international tournament in Croatia launched as Croatia Open.

== Previous winners ==
=== Croatian International ===
Year	Men's singles	Women's singles	Men's doubles	Women's doubles	Mixed doubles	Ref
1999	(Germany) Steve Marvin	(Slovenia) Maja Pohar	(Ukraine) Dmitry Miznikov (Ukraine) Valeriy Strelcov	(Ukraine) Natalja Esipenko (Ukraine) Natalia Golovkina	(Ukraine) Valeriy Strelcov (Ukraine) Natalia Golovkina	
2000	(Wales) Richard Vaughan	(Finland) Anu Weckström	(Poland) Michał Łogosz (Poland) Robert Mateusiak	(Wales) Felicity Gallup (Wales) Joanne Muggeridge	(Canada) Michael Beres (Canada) Kara Solmundson	
2001	(Germany) Oliver Pongratz	(Netherlands) Karina de Wit	(Germany) Kristof Hopp (Germany) Thomas Tesche	(Netherlands) Erica van den Heuvel (Netherlands) Nicole van Hooren	(Denmark) Peter Steffensen (Denmark) Lene Mørk	
2002	(Poland) Przemysław Wacha	(Bulgaria) Petya Nedelcheva	(France) Vincent Laigle (France) Svetoslav Stoyanov	(New Zealand) Tammy Jenkins (New Zealand) Rhona Robertson	(Scotland) Russell Hogg (Scotland) Kirsteen McEwan	
2003	(Singapore) Hendra Wijaya	(France) Pi Hongyan	(France) Vincent Laigle (France) Svetoslav Stoyanov	(Japan) Miyuki Tai (Japan) Yoshiko Iwata	(Denmark) Carsten Mogensen (Denmark) Kamilla Rytter Juhl	
2004	(Japan) Hidetaka Yamada	(Singapore) Li Li	(Sweden) Daniel Glaser (Sweden) Dennis von Dahn	(Singapore) Jiang Yanmei (Singapore) Li Li	(France) Svetoslav Stoyanov (France) Victoria Wright	
2005	(Switzerland) Holvy de Pauw	(Japan) Miyo Akao	(Denmark) Simon Mollyhus (Denmark) Anders Kristiansen	(Singapore) Frances Liu (Singapore) Shinta Mulia Sari	(Singapore) Hendra Wijaya (Singapore) Frances Liu	
2006	(England) Andrew Smith	(Bulgaria) Petya Nedelcheva	(England) Chris Tonks (England) Chris Langridge	(England) Liza Parker (England) Jenny Day	(England) Chris Langridge (England) Jenny Day	
2007	(England) Carl Baxter	(China) Guo Xin	(Belgium) Wouter Claes (Belgium) Frédéric Mawet	(China) Cai Jiani (China) Guo Xin	(Belgium) Wouter Claes (Belgium) Nathalie Descamps	
2008	(Finland) Ville Lång	(Japan) Kaori Imabeppu	(India) Rupesh Kumar (India) Sanave Thomas	(Denmark) Maria Thorberg (Estonia) Kati Tolmoff	(France) Baptiste Carême (France) Laura Choinet	
2009	(Denmark) Peter Mikkelsen	(Malaysia) Anita Raj Kaur	(Denmark) Mads Conrad-Petersen (Denmark) Mads Pieler Kolding	(Turkey) Ezgi Epice (Germany) Claudia Vogelsang	(Croatia) Zvonimir Đurkinjak (Croatia) Staša Poznanović	
2010	(England) Ben Beckman	(Germany) Nicole Grether	(Wales) Joe Morgan (Wales) James Phillips	(Germany) Nicole Grether (Canada) Charmaine Reid	(Croatia) Zvonimir Đurkinjak (Croatia) Staša Poznanović	
2011	(Germany) Dieter Domke	(Japan) Minatsu Mitani	(Denmark) Kim Astrup (Denmark) Rasmus Fladberg	(Denmark) Sandra-Maria Jensen (Denmark) Line Kjærsfeldt	(Croatia) Zvonimir Đurkinjak (Croatia) Staša Poznanović	
2012	(Germany) Lukas Schmidt	(Japan) Kana Ito	(Netherlands) Jacco Arends (Netherlands) Jelle Maas	(Netherlands) Samantha Barning (Netherlands) Eefje Muskens	(Netherlands) Jacco Arends (Netherlands) Ilse Vaessen	
2013	(Italy) Wisnu Haryo Putro	(Russia) Natalia Perminova	(Indonesia) Christopher Rusdianto (Indonesia) Trikusuma Wardhana	(Russia) Irina Khlebko (Russia) Ksenia Polikarpova	(Denmark) Niclas Nøhr (Denmark) Rikke Søby Hansen	
2014	(Germany) Lukas Schmidt	(Denmark) Mette Poulsen	(Denmark) Mathias Christiansen (Denmark) David Daugaard	(Denmark) Julie Finne-Ipsen (Denmark) Rikke Søby Hansen	(Denmark) Niclas Nøhr (Denmark) Sara Thygesen	
2015	(Netherlands) Eric Pang	(Russia) Elena Komendrovskaya	(England) Peter Briggs (England) Tom Wolfenden	(Denmark) Maiken Fruergaard (Denmark) Camilla Martens	(Croatia) Zvonimir Đurkinjak (Croatia) Matea Čiča	
2016	(Norway) Marius Myhre	(Russia) Elena Komendrovskaya	(Croatia) Zvonimir Đurkinjak (Croatia) Filip Špoljarec	(Russia) Ksenia Evgenova (Russia) Elena Komendrovskaja	(Croatia) Zvonimir Đurkinjak (Croatia) Matea Čiča	
2017	(Finland) Kasper Lehikoinen	(Denmark) Anne Hald Jensen	(Croatia) Zvonimir Đurkinjak (Croatia) Zvonimir Hölbling	(Estonia) Kristin Kuuba (Estonia) Helina Rüütel	(England) Matthew Clare (England) Victoria Williams	
2018	(Bulgaria) Daniel Nikolov	(Bulgaria) Mariya Mitsova	(Germany) Peter Lang (Germany) Thomas Legleitner	(Russia) Ksenia Evgenova (Russia) Anastasiia Semenova	(Poland) Paweł Pietryja (Poland) Aneta Wojtkowska	
2019	(India) Rahul Bharadwaj	(Hungary) Laura Sárosi	(Denmark) Emil Lauritzen (Denmark) Mads Muurholm	(Netherlands) Debora Jille (Netherlands) Alyssa Tirtosentono	(Denmark) Emil Lauritzen (Denmark) Iben Bergstein	
2020	Cancelled (Note: This tournament, originally to be played from 23 to 26 September, was later cancelled due to the COVID-19 pandemic in Croatia.)					
2021	Cancelled (Note: This tournament, originally to be played from 30 September to 3 October, was later cancelled due to the COVID-19 pandemic in Croatia.)					
2022	(China) Liu Haichao	(Chinese Taipei) Huang Ching-ping	(Chinese Taipei) Chiu Hsiang-chieh (Chinese Taipei) Yang Ming-tse	(China) Qiao Shijun (China) Zhou Xinru	(Chinese Taipei) Chiu Hsiang-chieh (Chinese Taipei) Lin Xiao-min	
2023	(Israel) Daniil Dubovenko	(Switzerland) Milena Schnider	(Poland) Robert Cybulski (Poland) Szymon Ślepecki	(Poland) Paulina Hankiewicz (Poland) Kornelia Marczak	(England) Samuel Jones (England) Sian Kelly	
2024	(Indonesia) Rizki Ansyahri	(India) Raksha Kandasamy	(Serbia) Viktor Petrović (Serbia) Mihajlo Tomić	(Austria) Serena Au Yeong (Austria) Anna Hagspiel	(Serbia) Mihajlo Tomić (Serbia) Andjela Vitman	
2025	(Chinese Taipei) Huang Yu	(Japan) Yuma Nagasako	(Japan) Shuji Sawada (Japan) Tsubasa Yoshida	(Japan) Yuma Nagasako (Japan) Aya Tamaki	(Japan) Shuji Sawada (Japan) Aya Tamaki	
2026	(France) Mady Sow	(India) Anwesha Gowda	(Norway) Torjus Flaaten (Norway) Jonas Østhassel	(France) Lily Gautier (France) Manon Heitzmann	(Denmark) Alexander Pedersen (Austria) Serena Au Yeong	

=== Croatia Open ===
Year	Men's singles	Women's singles	Men's doubles	Women's doubles	Mixed doubles	Ref
2022	(Malaysia) Justin Hoh	(Vietnam) Vũ Thị Anh Thư	(Singapore) Donovan Wee (Singapore) Howin Wong	(Hong Kong) Lui Lok Lok (Hong Kong) Ng Shiu Yee	(England) Jonty Russ (England) Sian Kelly	
2023– 2024	No competition					

== Performances by nation ==
=== Croatian International ===
As of the 2026 edition

Pos	Nation	MS	WS	MD	WD	XD	Total
1	Denmark	1	2	5	3.5	5.5	17
2	Japan	1	5	1	2	1	10
3	England	3		2	1	3	9
3	Germany	5	1	2	1		9
5	Croatia*			2		5	7
5	France	1	1	2	1	2	7
5	Netherlands	1	1	1	3	1	7
8	Russia		3		3		6
9	Poland	1		2	1	1	5
9	Singapore	1	1		2	1	5
11	Bulgaria	1	3				4
11	China	1	1		2		4
11	Chinese Taipei	1	1	1		1	4
11	India	1	2	1			4
15	Finland	2	1				3
15	Ukraine			1	1	1	3
15	Wales	1		1	1		3
18	Belgium			1		1	2
18	Indonesia	1		1			2
18	Norway	1		1			2
18	Serbia			1		1	2
18	Switzerland	1	1				2
23	Austria				1	0.5	1.5
23	Canada				0.5	1	1.5
23	Estonia				1.5		1.5
26	Hungary		1				1
26	Israel	1					1
26	Italy	1					1
26	Malaysia		1				1
26	New Zealand				1		1
26	Scotland					1	1
26	Slovenia		1				1
26	Sweden			1			1
34	Turkey				0.5		0.5
Total		26	26	26	26	26	130

* Host nation

=== Croatia Open ===
As of the 2022 edition

Pos	Nation	MS	WS	MD	WD	XD	Total
1	England					1	1
1	Hong Kong				1		1
1	Malaysia	1					1
1	Singapore			1			1
1	Vietnam		1				1
Total		1	1	1	1	1	5
