= Filip Špoljarec =

Croatian badminton player (born 1994)

Personal information
- Born: 1 May 1994 (age 32)

Sport
- Country: Croatia
- Sport: Badminton
- Handedness: Right

Men's singles & doubles
- Highest ranking: 329 (MS 10 May 2018); 152 (MD 20 October 2016); 292 (XD 17 July 2014)
- BWF profile
Medal record
Men's badminton
Representing Croatia
Mediterranean Games
Bronze medal – third place	2022 Oran	Men's doubles

Filip Špoljarec (born 1 May 1994) is a Croatian badminton player.

== Achievements ==
=== Mediterranean Games ===
Men's doubles
Year	Venue	Partner	Opponent	Score	Result	Ref.
2022	Multipurpose Omnisports Hall; Oued Tlélat, Algeria	(Croatia) Luka Ban	(Algeria) Koceila Mammeri (Algeria) Youcef Sabri Medel	21–18, 15–21, 14–21	Bronze	

=== BWF International Challenge/Series (1 title, 2 runners-up) ===
Men's doubles
Year	Tournament	Partner	Opponent	Score	Result
2016	Croatian International	(Croatia) Zvonimir Đurkinjak	(Denmark) Patrick Bjerregaard (Denmark) Mikkel Normann	21–14, 21–19	(gold) Winner
2018	Hatzor International	(Slovenia) Andraž Krapež	(Israel) Ariel Shainski (Czech Republic) Lukáš Zevl	21–15, 15–21, 16–21	(silver) Runner-up
2023	Giraldilla International	(Croatia) Aria Dinata	(England) Kelvin Ho (Jamaica) Samuel Ricketts	18–21, 21–15, 16–21	(silver) Runner-up

BWF International Challenge tournament
BWF International Series tournament
BWF Future Series tournament
