= Staša Poznanović =

Croatian badminton player (born 1988)

Personal information
- Born: 21 October 1988 (age 38) Zagreb, Croatia
- Height: 1.70 m (5 ft 7 in)
- Weight: 65 kg (143 lb)

Sport
- Country: Croatia
- Sport: Badminton

Women's
- Highest ranking: 212 (WS) 21 Jan 2010; 85 (WD) 21 Jan 2010; 41 (XD) 26 May 2011
- BWF profile

Staša Poznanović (born 21 October 1988) is a Croatian female badminton player.

== Achievements ==
=== BWF International Challenge/Series ===
Women's doubles
Year	Tournament	Partner	Opponent	Score	Result
2012	Hungarian International	(Germany) Carola Bott	(Denmark) Julie Finne-Ipsen (Denmark) Rikke S. Hansen	21-17, 23–21	(gold) Winner
2011	Hungarian International	(Poland) Natalia Pocztowiak	(Poland) Kamila Augustyn (Poland) Agnieszka Wojtkowska	22-20, 20–22, 21–18	(gold) Winner
2011	Croatian International	(Poland) Natalia Pocztowiak	(Denmark) Sandra-Maria Jensen (Denmark) Line Kjaersfeldt	14-21, 18–21	(silver) Runner-up
2010	Slovenia International	(Poland) Natalia Pocztowiak	(Turkey) Özge Bayrak (Turkey) Ebru Tunali	21-17, 21–11	(gold) Winner
2010	Croatian International	(Croatia) Matea Čiča	(Germany) Nicole Grether (Canada) Charmaine Reid	11-21, 21–16, 10–21	(silver) Runner-up

Mixed doubles
Year	Tournament	Partner	Opponent	Score	Result
2013	Slovenia International	(Croatia) Zvonimir Đurkinjak	(Germany) Jones Rafli Jansen (Germany) Cisita Joity Jansen	21–12, 21–18	(gold) Winner
2012	Hungarian International	(Croatia) Zvonimir Đurkinjak	(Czech Republic) Jakub Bitman (Czech Republic) Alzbeta Basova	21-16, 21–18	(gold) Winner
2012	Slovenia International	(Croatia) Zvonimir Đurkinjak	(Germany) Hannes Kaesbauer (Germany) Kira Kattenbeck	21–9, 21–13	(gold) Winner
2012	Portugal International	(Croatia) Zvonimir Đurkinjak	(England) Marcus Ellis (England) Gabrielle White	17-21, 21–15, 22–24	(silver) Runner-up
2012	Croatian International	(Croatia) Zvonimir Đurkinjak	(Netherlands) Jacco Arends (Netherlands) Ilse Vaessen	20-22, 21–17, 16–21	(silver) Runner-up
2011	Spanish Open	(Croatia) Zvonimir Đurkinjak	(Denmark) Mikkel Delbo Larsen (Denmark) Mie Schjott-Kristensen	17-21, 19–21	(silver) Runner-up
2011	Croatian International	(Croatia) Zvonimir Đurkinjak	(Denmark) Kim Astrup Sorensen (Denmark) Line Kjaersfeldt	21-13, 21–13	(gold) Winner
2010	Slovenia International	(Croatia) Zvonimir Đurkinjak	(China) Mao Hong (Poland) Natalia Pocztowiak	21-15, 13–21, 17–21	(silver) Runner-up
2010	Croatian International	(Croatia) Zvonimir Đurkinjak	(Austria) Roman Zirnwald (Austria) Simone Prutsch	21-12, 24–22	(gold) Winner
2010	Portuguese International	(Croatia) Zvonimir Đurkinjak	(Netherlands) Jacco Arends (Netherlands) Selena Piek	21-14, 18–21, 21–11	(gold) Winner
2009	Croatian International	(Croatia) Zvonimir Đurkinjak	(Bulgaria) Konstantin Dobrev (Bulgaria) Maya Dobreva	21-13, 17–21, 21–9	(gold) Winner
2008	Slovenian International	(Croatia) Zvonimir Đurkinjak	(Bulgaria) Vladimir Metodiev (Bulgaria) Gabriela Banova	Walkover	(silver) Runner-up

BWF International Challenge tournament
BWF International Series tournament
BWF Future Series tournament
