= Matea Čiča =

Croatian badminton player (born 1985)

Personal information
- Born: 30 September 1985 (age 40) Zagreb, Croatia

Sport
- Country: Croatia
- Sport: Badminton

Women's Doubles & Mixed Doubles
- Highest ranking: 224 (WD) 26 Aug 2010; 352 (XD) 14 Apr 2016
- BWF profile

Matea Čiča (born 30 September 1985) is a Croatian badminton player.

== Achievements ==
=== BWF International Challenge/Series ===
Women's doubles

Year	Tournament	Partner	Opponent	Score	Result
2009	Croatian International	(Croatia) Andrea Žvorc	(Turkey) Ezgi Epice (Germany) Claudia Vogelgsang	22–20, 14–21, 9–21	(silver) Runner-up
2010	Croatian International	(Croatia) Staša Poznanović	(Germany) Nicole Grether (Canada) Charmaine Reid	11–21, 21–16, 10–21	(silver) Runner-up

Mixed doubles

Year	Tournament	Partner	Opponent	Score	Result
2015	Croatian International	(Croatia) Zvonimir Đurkinjak	(Denmark) Alexander Bond (Denmark) Ditte Søby Hansen	21–17, 21–13	(gold) Winner
2016	Croatian International	(Croatia) Zvonimir Đurkinjak	(Bulgaria) Alex Vlaar (Bulgaria) Mariya Mitsova	21–18, 21–11	(gold) Winner

BWF International Challenge tournament
BWF International Series tournament
BWF Future Series tournament
