= Zvonimir Đurkinjak =

Croatian badminton player (born 1988)

Personal information
- Born: 2 June 1988 (age 38) Zagreb, Croatia
- Height: 1.83 m (6 ft 0 in)
- Weight: 77 kg (170 lb)

Sport
- Country: Croatia
- Sport: Badminton
- Handedness: Right

Men's singles & doubles
- Highest ranking: 74 (MS 25 January 2019); 52 (MD 20 October 2011); 41 (XD 26 May 2011)
- Current ranking: 116 (MS 13 August 2019)
- BWF profile
Medal record
Men's badminton
Representing Croatia
Mediterranean Games
Gold medal – first place	2013 Mersin	Men's doubles

Zvonimir Đurkinjak (born 2 June 1988) is a Croatian badminton player who plays for the Medvedgrad 1998 badminton club.

== Career ==
Đurkinjak started playing badminton when he was 10. At the Croatian National Badminton Championships he won the men's singles and mixed doubles title nine times from 2005, and eight times in the men's doubles event from 2004. He won gold medal at the Mersin 2013 Mediterranean Games in the men's doubles event partnered with Zvonimir Hölbling. In 2015, he competed at the European Games in the men's singles and doubles event.

== Achievements ==
=== Mediterranean Games ===
Men's doubles
Year	Venue	Partner	Opponent	Score	Result
2013	Mersin University Hall, Mersin, Turkey	(Croatia) Zvonimir Hölbling	(Turkey) Emre Arslan (Turkey) Hüseyin Oruç	21–15, 21–9	Gold

=== BWF International Challenge/Series ===
Men's singles
Year	Tournament	Opponent	Score	Result
2017	Bulgarian Open	(India) Lakshya Sen	21–18, 12–21, 17–21	(silver) Runner-up
2017	Croatian International	(Finland) Kasper Lehikoinen	14–21, 16–21	(silver) Runner-up
2015	Czech Open	(Germany) Marc Zwiebler	24–26, 11–21	(silver) Runner-up
2014	Hungarian International	(Denmark) Kasper Dinesen	11–9, 9–11, 3–11, 4–11	(silver) Runner-up

Men's doubles
Year	Tournament	Partner	Opponent	Score	Result
2017	Croatian International	(Croatia) Zvonimir Hölbling	(Croatia) Igor Cimbur (Thailand) Samatcha Tovannakasem	21–17, 21–18	(gold) Winner
2016	Croatian International	(Croatia) Filip Špoljarec	(Denmark) Patrick Bjerregaard (Denmark) Mikkel Normann	21–14, 21–19	(gold) Winner
2016	Romanian International	(Croatia) Zvonimir Hölbling	(Malaysia) Ong Yew Sin (Malaysia) Teo Ee Yi	13–21, 9–21	(silver) Runner-up
2015	Slovenian International	(Croatia) Zvonimir Hölbling	(Germany) Johannes Pistorius (Germany) Marvin Emil Seidel	21–14, 16–21, 21–10	(gold) Winner
2015	Romanian International	(Croatia) Zvonimir Hölbling	(Poland) Milosz Bochat (Poland) Pawel Pietryja	11–9, 11–8, 11–7	(gold) Winner
2014	Hungarian International	(Croatia) Zvonimir Hölbling	(Denmark) Andreas Berthelsen (Denmark) Kasper Dinesen	10–11, 11–9, 10–11, 11–4, 11–5	(gold) Winner
2014	Slovenian International	(Croatia) Zvonimir Hölbling	(Russia) Nikita Khakimov (Russia) Vasily Kuznetsov	21–15, 21–18	(gold) Winner
2014	Romanian International	(Croatia) Zvonimir Hölbling	(France) Bastian Kersaudy (France) Gaetan Mittelheisser	21–12, 21–13	(gold) Winner
2013	Croatian International	(Croatia) Zvonimir Hölbling	(Indonesia) Christopher Rusdianto (Indonesia) Trikusuma Wardhana	14–21, 20–22	(silver) Runner-up
2012	Hungarian International	(Croatia) Zvonimir Hölbling	(Netherlands) Ruud Bosch (Netherlands) Jim Middelburg	21-17, 19–21, 16–21	(silver) Runner-up
2012	Slovenian International	(Croatia) Zvonimir Hölbling	(Germany) Andreas Heinz (Germany) Jones Rafli Jansen	17-21, 21–17, 21–12	(gold) Winner
2012	Portugal International	(Denmark) Nikolaj Overgaard	(England) Marcus Ellis (Scotland) Paul van Rietvelde	21-12, 22–20	(gold) Winner
2012	Croatian International	(Croatia) Zvonimir Hölbling	(Netherlands) Jacco Arends (Netherlands) Jelle Maas	16–21, 14–21	(silver) Runner-up
2011	Hungarian International	(Croatia) Zvonimir Hölbling	(Poland) Lukasz Moren (Poland) Wojciech Szkudlarczyk	21-18, 21–18	(gold) Winner
2010	Slovenian International	(Croatia) Zvonimir Hölbling	(Netherlands) Ruud Bosch (Netherlands) Koen Ridder	17-21, 15–21	(silver) Runner-up
2010	Portugal International	(Croatia) Zvonimir Hölbling	(Denmark) Martin Kragh (Denmark) Anders Skaarup Rasmussen	18-21, 14–21	(silver) Runner-up
2010	Croatian International	(Croatia) Zvonimir Hölbling	(Wales) Joe Morgan (Wales) James Phillips	14-21, 21–19, 20–22	(silver) Runner-up
2009	Turkiye International	(Croatia) Zvonimir Hölbling	(Sweden) Joel Johansson-Berg (Indonesia) Imam Sodikin	Walkover	(silver) Runner-up
2008	Slovak Open	(Czech Republic) Jakub Bitman	(Iceland) Magnús Ingi Helgason (Iceland) Helgi Jóhannesson	11–21, 14–21	(silver) Runner-up
2008	Croatian International	(Czech Republic) Jakub Bitman	(India) K. T. Rupesh Kumar (India) Sanave Thomas	9–21, 14–21	(silver) Runner-up
2007	Slovak International	(Czech Republic) Jakub Bitman	(Russia) Ivan Sozonov (Russia) Anton Ivanov	Walkover	(gold) Winner

Mixed doubles
Year	Tournament	Partner	Opponent	Score	Result
2016	Croatian International	(Croatia) Mateja Čiča	(Bulgaria) Alex Vlaar (Bulgaria) Mariya Mitsova	21–18, 21–11	(gold) Winner
2015	Croatian International	(Croatia) Mateja Čiča	(Denmark) Alexander Bond (Denmark) Ditte Soby Hansen	21–17, 21–13	(gold) Winner
2013	Italian International	(United States) Eva Lee	(Netherlands) Jacco Arends (Netherlands) Selena Piek	23–21, 21–18	(gold) Winner
2013	Slovenian International	(Croatia) Staša Poznanović	(Germany) Jones Rafli Jansen (Germany) Cisita Joity Jansen	21–12, 21–18	(gold) Winner
2012	Hungarian International	(Croatia) Staša Poznanović	(Czech Republic) Jakub Bitman (Czech Republic) Alzbeta Basova	21-16, 21–18	(gold) Winner
2012	Slovenia International	(Croatia) Staša Poznanović	(Germany) Hannes Kaesbauer (Germany) Kira Kattenbeck	21–9, 21–13	(gold) Winner
2012	Portugal International	(Croatia) Staša Poznanović	(England) Marcus Ellis (England) Gabrielle White	17-21, 21–15, 22–24	(silver) Runner-up
2012	Croatian International	(Croatia) Staša Poznanović	(Netherlands) Jacco Arends (Netherlands) Ilse Vaessen	20-22, 21–17, 16–21	(silver) Runner-up
2011	Spanish Open	(Croatia) Staša Poznanović	(Denmark) Mikkel Delbo Larsen (Denmark) Mie Schjott-Kristensen	17-21, 19–21	(silver) Runner-up
2011	Croatian International	(Croatia) Staša Poznanović	(Denmark) Kim Astrup (Denmark) Line Kjaersfeldt	21-13, 21–13	(gold) Winner
2010	Slovenia International	(Croatia) Staša Poznanović	(China) Mao Hong (Poland) Natalia Pocztowiak	21-15, 13–21, 17–21	(silver) Runner-up
2010	Croatian International	(Croatia) Staša Poznanović	(Austria) Roman Zirnwald (Austria) Simone Prutsch	21-12, 24–22	(gold) Winner
2010	Portuguese International	(Croatia) Staša Poznanović	(Netherlands) Jacco Arends (Netherlands) Selena Piek	21-14, 18–21, 21–11	(gold) Winner
2009	Croatian International	(Croatia) Staša Poznanović	(Bulgaria) Konstantin Dobrev (Bulgaria) Maya Dobreva	21-13, 17–21, 21–9	(gold) Winner
2008	Slovenian International	(Croatia) Staša Poznanović	(Bulgaria) Vladimir Metodiev (Bulgaria) Gabriela Banova	Walkover	(silver) Runner-up

BWF International Challenge tournament
BWF International Series tournament
BWF Future Series tournament

=== National championships ===
- 2004 – men's doubles with Luka Zdenjak
- 2005 – mixed doubles with Andrea Žvorc
- 2006 – men's doubles with Luka Zdenjak & mixed doubles with Staša Poznanović
- 2007 – men's singles, men's doubles with Luka Zdenjak & mixed doubles with Staša Poznanović
- 2008 – men's doubles with Luka Zdenjak & mixed doubles with Staša Poznanović
- 2009 – men's singles
- 2010 – men's singles & mixed doubles with Staša Poznanović
- 2011 – men's singles & mixed doubles with Staša Poznanović
- 2012 – men's singles & mixed doubles with Staša Poznanović
- 2013 – men's singles, men's doubles with Filip Špoljarec & mixed doubles with Staša Poznanović
- 2014 – men's singles, men's doubles with Filip Špoljarec & mixed doubles with Matea Čiča
- 2015 – men's singles & men's doubles with Filip Špoljarec
- 2016 – men's singles & men's doubles with Filip Špoljarec
