= Zvonimir Hölbling =

Croatian badminton player (born 1989)

Personal information
- Born: 3 August 1989 (age 37) Zagreb, Croatia
- Height: 1.80 m (5 ft 11 in)
- Weight: 79 kg (174 lb)

Sport
- Country: Croatia
- Sport: Badminton

Men's
- Highest ranking: 301 (MS) 21 January 2010; 52 (MD) 20 October 2011; 255 (XD) 18 March 2010
- BWF profile
Medal record
Men's Badminton
Representing Croatia
Mediterranean Games
Gold medal – first place	2013 Mersin	Men's doubles

Zvonimir Hölbling (born 3 August 1989) is a Croatian male badminton player who plays for the Medvedgrad 1998 badminton club and also BV Mülheim in Germany.

== Personal life ==
He was educated at the University of Zagreb Faculty of Electrical Engineering and Computing.

== Career ==
Zvonimir started playing badminton at age 10 and competed in various junior international tournaments throughout his teenage years where he achieved a lot of great results that put him to the top of the European junior circuit ranking. Since his junior days, he has had a lot of great results and won tournaments in men's doubles on the international tour with his partner Zvonimir Đurkinjak. He competed at the 2013 Mediterranean Games in Mersin, where he won gold medal in men's doubles tournament making a historic success for Croatian badminton. In 2015, he competed at the European Games in Baku, Azerbaijan.

== Achievements ==
=== Mediterranean Games ===
Men's Doubles
Year	Venue	Partner	Opponent	Score	Result
2013	Mersin University Hall, Mersin, Turkey	(Croatia) Zvonimir Đurkinjak	(Turkey) Emre Arslan (Turkey) Hüseyin Oruç	21-15, 21–9	Gold

=== BWF International Challenge/Series ===
Men's Doubles
Year	Tournament	Partner	Opponent	Score	Result
2017	Croatian International	(Croatia) Zvonimir Đurkinjak	(Croatia) Igor Cimbur (Thailand) Samatcha Tovannakasem	21–17, 21–18	(gold) Winner
2016	Romanian International	(Croatia) Zvonimir Đurkinjak	(Malaysia) Ong Yew Sin (Malaysia) Teo Ee Yi	13–21, 9–21	(silver) Runner-up
2015	Slovenian International	(Croatia) Zvonimir Đurkinjak	(Germany) Johannes Pistorius (Germany) Marvin Emil Seidel	21–14, 16–21, 21–10	(gold) Winner
2015	Romanian International	(Croatia) Zvonimir Đurkinjak	(Poland) Milosz Bochat (Poland) Pawel Pietryja	11–9, 11–8, 11–7	(gold) Winner
2014	Hungarian International	(Croatia) Zvonimir Đurkinjak	(Denmark) Andreas Berthelsen (Denmark) Kasper Dinesen	10–11, 11–9, 10–11, 11–4, 11–5	(gold) Winner
2014	Slovenian International	(Croatia) Zvonimir Đurkinjak	(Russia) Nikita Khakimov (Russia) Vasily Kuznetsov	21–15, 21–18	(gold) Winner
2014	Romanian International	(Croatia) Zvonimir Đurkinjak	(France) Bastian Kersaudy (France) Gaetan Mittelheisser	21–12, 21–13	(gold) Winner
2013	Croatian International	(Croatia) Zvonimir Đurkinjak	(Indonesia) Christopher Rusdianto (Indonesia) Trikusuma Wardhana	14–21, 20–22	(silver) Runner-up
2012	Hungarian International	(Croatia) Zvonimir Đurkinjak	(Netherlands) Ruud Bosch (Netherlands) Jim Middelburg	21-17, 19–21, 16–21	(silver) Runner-up
2012	Slovenian International	(Croatia) Zvonimir Đurkinjak	(Germany) Andreas Heinz (Germany) Jones Rafli Jansen	17-21, 21–17, 21–12	(gold) Winner
2012	Croatian International	(Croatia) Zvonimir Đurkinjak	(Netherlands) Jacco Arends (Netherlands) Jelle Maas	16–21, 14–21	(silver) Runner-up
2011	Hungarian International	(Croatia) Zvonimir Đurkinjak	(Poland) Lukasz Moren (Poland) Wojciech Szkudlarczyk	21-18, 21–18	(gold) Winner
2010	Slovenian International	(Croatia) Zvonimir Đurkinjak	(Netherlands) Ruud Bosch (Netherlands) Koen Ridder	17-21, 15–21	(silver) Runner-up
2010	Portugal International	(Croatia) Zvonimir Đurkinjak	(Denmark) Martin Kragh (Denmark) Anders Skaarup Rasmussen	18-21, 14–21	(silver) Runner-up
2010	Croatian International	(Croatia) Zvonimir Đurkinjak	(Wales) Joe Morgan (Wales) James Phillips	14-21, 21–19, 20–22	(silver) Runner-up
2009	Turkiye International	(Croatia) Zvonimir Đurkinjak	(Sweden) Joel Johansson-Berg (Indonesia) Imam Sodikin	Walkover	(silver) Runner-up

BWF International Challenge tournament
BWF International Series tournament
BWF Future Series tournament

=== National championships ===
- 2009 – men's doubles with Igor Čimbur
- 2010 – men's doubles with Igor Čimbur
- 2011 – men's doubles with Igor Čimbur
- 2012 – men's doubles with Igor Čimbur
- 2015 – mixed doubles with Matea Čiča
- 2016 – mixed doubles with Matea Čiča
