= European Universities Badminton Championships =

European Universities Badminton Championships were the first organised in 2004 and have been organised annually since.

The European Universities Badminton Championships are coordinated by the European University Sports Association along with the 18 other sports on the program of the European universities championships.

== Summary ==
Edition	Year	Location	Nb of countries	Nb of teams	Nb of participants
1st EUC	2004	Poland; Krakaw	4	9	45
2nd EUC	2005	Germany; Mainz	9	10	80
3rd EUC	2006	Portugal; Lisbon	13	15	110
4th EUC	2007	Russia; St Petersburg	12	18	150
5th EUC	2008	Poland; Krakaw	9	14	105
6th EUC	2009	Switzerland; Geneva	12	18	173
7th EUC	2010	France; Nancy	15	21	192
8th EUC	2011	Ukraine; Kharkov	9	15	111
European Universities Games	2012	Spain; Cordoba	13	20	144
9th EUC	2013	Sweden; Uppsala	13	15	130
EUG, Rotterdam	2014	Netherlands; Rotterdam	12	18	120
10th EUC	2015	Poland; Warsaw	*	*	*
EUG, Zagreb&Rijeka	2016	Croatia; Zagreb, Rijeka	*	*	*
11th EUC	2017	Slovenia; Ljubljana	*	*	*
EUG, Coimbra	2018	Portugal; Coimbra	*	*	*
12th EUC	2019	Poland; Lodz	11	15	*

== Results ==
Year	Event	Gold	Silver	Bronze	Bronze
2004	Women's Doubles	Maja Tvrdy / Maja Kersnik; Slovenia (University of Ljubljana)	Helen Reino / Piret Hamer; Estonia (EUSF Estonia)	Fiona Kelly / Katrin Oliver; Ireland (University College Dublin)	Agata Doroszkiewicz / Paulina Matusewicz; Poland (AZS Poland)
2004	Women's Singles	Maja Tvrdy; Slovenia (Universität Ljubljana)	Kai Riin Saluste; Estonia (EUSF Estonia)	Helen Reino; Estonia (EUSF Estonia)	Piret Hamer; Estonia (EUSF Estonia)
2004	Men's Doubles	Aleš Murn / Luka Petrič; Slovenia (Universität Ljubljana)	Kamil Marcjan / Jan Rudzinski; Poland (AZS Poland)	Mark Ward / Donal Mangan; Ireland (University College Dublin)	Lech Dryżałowski / Przemysław Jankowski; Poland (Universität Warschau)
2004	Men's Singles	Luka Petrič; Slovenia (Universität Ljubljana)	Aleš Murn; Slovenia (Universität Ljubljana)	Vahur Lukin; Estonia (EUSF Estonia)	Zbigniew Jasiulewicz; Poland (AZS Poland)
2004	Mixed Doubles	Luka Petrič / Maja Kersnik; Slovenia (Universität Ljubljana)	Jan Rudzinski / Paulina Matusewicz; Poland (AZS Poland)	Aleš Murn / Maja Tvrdy; Slovenia (Universität Ljubljana)	Zbigniew Jasiulewicz / Agata Stelmaszczyk; Poland (AZS Poland)
2004	Team	Slovenia Universität Ljubljana	Germany Johannes Gutenberg-Universität Mainz|Universität Mainz	Estonia EUSF Estonia	Poland AZS Poland
2005	Women's Doubles	Paulina Matusewicz / Małgorzata Kurdelska; Poland (AZS Poland)	Helen Reino / Kai Riin Saluste; Estonia (Universität Tartu)	Tetyana Krylova / Mariya Martynenko; Ukraine (Kharkiv Polytechnic Institute)	Viktoriya Pogrebniak / Ganna Kobtseva; Ukraine (Kharkiv Polytechnic Institute)
2005	Women's Singles	Mariya Martynenko; Ukraine (Kharkiv Polytechnic Institute)	Kathrin Hoffmann; Germany (WG München)	Helen Reino; Estonia (Universität Tartu)	Kai Riin Saluste; Estonia (Universität Tartu)
2005	Men's Doubles	Michael Fuchs / Roman Spitko; Germany (Universität des Saarlandes)	Wojciech Szkudlarczyk / Adam Cwalina; Poland (AZS Poland)	Stephan Löll / Sebastian Mathé; Germany (Ruhr-Universität Bochum)	Marcel Reuter / Michael Cassel; Germany (Universität des Saarlandes)
2005	Men's Singles	Marcel Reuter; Germany (Universität des Saarlandes)	Dmytro Zavadsky; Ukraine (Kharkiv Polytechnic Institute)	Vitaliy Konov; Ukraine (Kharkiv Polytechnic Institute)	Stephan Löll; Germany (Ruhr-Universität Bochum)
2005	Mixed Doubles	Wojciech Szkudlarczyk / Paulina Matusewicz; Poland (AZS Poland)	Dmytro Zavadsky / Mariya Martynenko; Ukraine (Kharkiv Polytechnic Institute)	Michael Fuchs / Aline Decker; Germany (Universität des Saarlandes)	Adam Cwalina / Małgorzata Kurdelska; Poland (AZS Poland)
2005	Team	Poland AZS Poland	Ukraine Kharkiv Polytechnic Institute	Germany WG München	*
2006	Women's Doubles	Angelika Węgrzyn / Małgorzata Kurdelska; Poland (AZS Poland)	Evgenia Dimova / Anna Efremova; Russia (Staatliche Universität des Fernen Ostens)	Helen Reino / Kai Riin Saluste; Estonia (Universität Tartu)	Agata Rzepcyk / Paulina Matusewicz; Poland (Technische Universität Krakau)
2006	Women's Singles	Evgenia Dimova; Russia (Staatliche Universität des Fernen Ostens)	Kai Riin Saluste; Estonia (Universität Tartu)	Anna Efremova; Russia (Staatliche Universität des Fernen Ostens)	Claudia Klingelhöfer; Germany (WG München)
2006	Men's Doubles	Evgeny Dremin / Alexey Vasiliev; Russia (Staatliche Universität des Fernen Ostens)	Nikolai Ukk / Victor Maljutin; Russia (FINEC St. Petersburg)	Steve Day / Tom Armstrong; England (Loughborough University)	Ivan Baboshin / Anatoly Baranov; Russia (Staatliche Technische Universität Moskau)
2006	Men's Singles	Jan Fröhlich; Czech Republic (Karls-Universität Prag)	Victor Maljutin; Russia (FINEC St. Petersburg)	Nikolai Ukk; Russia (FINEC St. Petersburg)	Brice Leverdez; France (Lycée Marcelin Berthelot de St. Maur)
2006	Mixed Doubles	Evgeny Dremin / Evgenia Dimova; Russia (Staatliche Universität des Fernen Ostens)	Alexey Vasiliev / Anna Efremova; Russia (Staatliche Universität des Fernen Ostens)	Tom Armstrong / Jenny Day; England (Loughborough University)	Steve Day / Caroline Smith; England (Loughborough University)
2006	Team	Russia Staatliche Universität des Fernen Ostens	Poland AZS Poland	England Loughborough University	*
2007	Women's Doubles	Valeria Rojdestvenskaya / Ksenia Polikarpova; Russia (FINEC St. Petersburg)	Liz Brett / Caroline Smith; England (Loughborough University)	Lubov Chydenseva / Anastacia Naymenkova; Russia (Universität Tscheljabinsk)	Karoline Neumann / Claudia Klingelhöfer; Germany (WG München)
2007	Women's Singles	Elena Prus; Ukraine (Kharkiv Polytechnic Institute)	Mariya Martynenko; Ukraine (Kharkiv Polytechnic Institute)	Evgenia Dimova; Russia (Staatliche Universität des Fernen Ostens)	Ksenia Polikarpova; Russia (FINEC St. Petersburg)
2007	Men's Doubles	Viktor Maljutin / Nikolai Ukk; Russia (FINEC St. Petersburg)	Sergey Lunev / Alexey Vasiliev; Russia (Staatliche Universität des Fernen Ostens)	Vladimir Ivanov / Nikita Hakimov; Russia (Universität Tscheljabinsk)	Peter Zauner / Roman Zirnwald; Austria (Universität Wien)
2007	Men's Singles	Jens Roch; Germany (WG Saarbrücken)	Vladimir Ivanov; Russia (Universität Tscheljabinsk)	Sergey Lunev; Russia (Staatliche Universität des Fernen Ostens)	Sebastian Schöttler; Germany (WG Hamburg)
2007	Mixed Doubles	Alexey Vasiliev / Evgenia Dimova; Russia (Staatliche Universität des Fernen Ostens)	Anton Nazarenko / Elena Shimko; Russia (Lomonossow-Universität)	Tom Armstrong / Liz Brett; England (Loughborough University)	Maurice Niesner / Astrid Hoffmann; Germany (WG Hamburg)
2007	Team	Germany WG Hamburg	Russia Staatliche Universität des Fernen Ostens	Ukraine Kharkiv Polytechnic Institute	*
2008	Women's Doubles	Małgorzata Kurdelska / Natalia Pocztowiak; Poland (AWF Wroclaw)	Agnieszka Wojtkowska / Aleksandra Walaszek; Poland (Academy of Humanities and Economics Lódz)	Justine Ling / Ava Monney; Switzerland (Universität Genf)	Caroline Smith / Jenny Day; England (Loughborough University)
2008	Women's Singles	Kamila Augustyn; Poland (Academy of Humanities and Economics Lódz)	Agnieszka Wojtkowska; Poland (Academy of Humanities and Economics Lódz)	Evgeniya Dimova; Russia (Staatliche Universität des Fernen Ostens)	Caroline Smith; England (Loughborough University)
2008	Men's Doubles	Rafał Hawel / Przemysław Wacha; Poland (Academy of Humanities and Economics Lódz)	Maurice Niesner / Till Zander; Germany (WG Hamburg)	Konstantin Khlestov /Vladimir Malkov; Russia (Universität Saratow)	Evgeny Dremin / Sergey Lunev; Russia (Staatliche Universität des Fernen Ostens)
2008	Men's Singles	Przemysław Wacha; Poland (Academy of Humanities and Economics Lódz)	Vladimir Malkov; Russia (Universität Saratow)	Rafał Hawel; Poland (Academy of Humanities and Economics Lódz)	Sebastian Schöttler; Germany (WG Hamburg)
2008	Mixed Doubles	Adam Cwalina / Małgorzata Kurdelska; Poland (AWF Wroclaw)	Evgeny Dremin / Evgeniya Dimova; Russia (Staatliche Universität des Fernen Ostens)	Łukasz Moreń / Kamila Augustyn; Poland (Academy of Humanities and Economics Lódz)	Tom Armstrong / Jenny Day; England (Loughborough University)
2008	Team	Poland Academy of Humanities and Economics Lódz	Germany WG Hamburg	Russia Staatliche Universität des Fernen Ostens	*
2009	Women's Doubles	Olga Konon / Agnieszka Wojtkowska; Poland (Academy of Humanities and Economics Lódz)	Małgorzata Kurdelska / Natalia Pocztowiak; Poland (Universität Breslau)	Justine Ling / Ava Monney; Switzerland (Universität Genf)	Caroline Smith / Jenny Day; England (Loughborough University)
2009	Women's Singles	Olga Konon; Poland (Academy of Humanities and Economics Lódz)	Mariya Diptan; Ukraine (Kharkiv Polytechnic Institute)	Oznur Caliskan; Turkey (Universität Uludag)	Sabrina Jaquet; Switzerland (EHSM Magglingen)
2009	Men's Doubles	Oliver Roth / Peter Käsbauer; Germany (WG Saarbrücken)	Łukasz Moreń / Michał Rogalski; Poland (Academy of Humanities and Economics Lódz)	Rafał Hawel / Przemysław Wacha; Poland (Academy of Humanities and Economics Lódz)	Maurice Niesner / Till Zander; Germany (WG Hamburg)
2009	Men's Singles	Przemysław Wacha; Poland (Academy of Humanities and Economics Lódz)	Dmytro Zavadsky; Ukraine (Kharkiv Polytechnic Institute)	Rafał Hawel; Poland (Academy of Humanities and Economics Lódz)	Lukas Schmidt; Germany (WG Saarbrücken)
2009	Mixed Doubles	Tom Armstrong / Jenny Day; England (Loughborough University)	Łukasz Moreń / Agnieszka Wojtkowska; Poland (Academy of Humanities and Economics Lódz)	Georgiy Natarov / Ganna Kobtseva; Ukraine (Kharkiv Polytechnic Institute)	Christopher Hotchen / Sarah Boyce; England (University of Bath)
2009	Team	Poland Academy of Humanities and Economics Lódz	England Loughborough University	Germany WG Hamburg	Ukraine Kharkiv Polytechnic Institute
2010	Women's Doubles	Olga Konon / Agnieszka Wojtkowska; Poland (Academy of Humanities and Economics Lódz)	Sashina Vignes Waran / Teshana Vignes Waran; France (Universität Straßburg)	Kim Buss / Laura Ufermann; Germany (Universität Duisburg-Essen)	Kamila Augustyn / Aleksandra Walaszek; Poland (Academy of Humanities and Economics Lódz)
2010	Women's Singles	Sashina Vignes Waran; France (Universität Strasbourg)	Sabrina Jaquet; Switzerland (EHSM Magglingen)	Mariya Diptan; Ukraine (Kharkiv Polytechnic Institute)	Elena Prus; Ukraine (Kharkiv Polytechnic Institute)
2010	Men's Doubles	Vitaly Konov / Dmytro Zavadsky; Ukraine (Kharkiv Polytechnic Institute)	Till Zander / Philip Droste; Germany (WG Hamburg)	Gary Fox / Ben Stawski; England (Loughborough University)	Sebastian Schöttler / Hannes Roffmann; Germany (WG Hamburg)
2010	Men's Singles	Dmytro Zavadsky; Ukraine (Kharkiv Polytechnic Institute)	Sebastian Schöttler; Germany (WG Hamburg)	Mathieu Pohl; Germany (Universität des Saarlandes)	Michał Rogalski; Poland (Academy of Humanities and Economics Lódz)
2010	Mixed Doubles	Rafał Hawel / Kamilla Augustyn; Poland (Academy of Humanities and Economics Lódz)	Łukasz Moreń / Agnieszka Wojtkowska; Poland (Academy of Humanities and Economics Lódz)	Till Zander / Astrid Hoffmann; Germany (WG Hamburg)	Adam Cwalina / Małgorzata Kurdelska; Poland (Universität Białystok)
2010	Team	Poland Academy of Humanities and Economics Lódz	Ukraine Kharkiv Polytechnic Institute	England Loughborough University	Germany Universität des Saarlandes
2011	Women's Doubles	Elena Prus / Ganna Kobtseva; Ukraine |Universität Charkiw	Mariya Ulitina] / Natalia Voitsekh; Ukraine Universität Charkiw	Kim Buss / Laura Ufermann; Germany Universität Duisburg-Essen	Mona Reich / Sandra Emrich; GermanyUniversität Mainz
2011	Women's Singles	Kim Buss; Germany Universität Duisburg-Essen	Elena Prus; Ukraine Universität Charkiw	Mariya Ulitina; Ukraine Dnipropetrovsk National Metallurgical Academy	Natalia Voitsekh; Ukraine Dnipropetrovsk National Metallurgical Academy
2011	Men's Doubles	Vitaly Konov / Dmytro Zavadsky; Ukraine |Universität Charkiw	Evgeny Dremin / Denis Grachev; Russia Staatliche Universität des Fernen Ostens	Christoph Heiniger / Thomas Heiniger; Switzerland Universität Bern	Antoine Bebin / Sylvain Ternon; France Universität Rouen
2011	Men's Singles	Dmytro Zavadsky; Ukraine Universität Charkiw	Lucas Claerbout; France Universität Bordeaux	Denis Grachev; Russia Staatliche Universität des Fernen Ostens	Sylvain Ternon; France Universität Rouen
2011	Mixed Doubles	Evgeny Dremin / Evgenia Dimova; Russia Staatliche Universität des Fernen Ostens	Till Zander / Astrid Hoffmann; Germany WG Hamburg	Georgiy Natarov / Ganna Kobtseva; Ukraine Universität Charkiw	Stepan Yaroslavtsev / Anastasia Chervyakova; Russia Universität Nischni Nowgorod
2011	Team	Russia Staatliche Universität des Fernen Ostens]	Ukraine Dnipropetrovsk National Metallurgical Academy	Ukraine Universität Charkiw	Russia Universität Nischni Nowgorod
2012	Women's Doubles	Kim Buss / Inken Wienefeld; Germany University of Duisburg-Essen	* / *	* / *	* / *
2012	Women's Singles	Anastasija Cherjakova; Russia Nizhny Novgorod State University	* / *	* / *	* / *
2012	Men's Doubles	Sebastian Gransbo / Peter Nordin; Sweden Stockholm University	* / *	* / *	* / *
2012	Men's Singles	Vladimir Malkov; Russia Saratov State University	* / *	* / *	* / *
2012	Mixed Doubles	Alexander Roovers / Kim Buss; Germany University of Duisburg-Essen	* / *	* / *	* / *
2012	Team	Russia Nizhny Novgorod State Pedagogical University	Germany University of Duisburg-Essen	Switzerland University of Berne	France University of Bordeaux
2013	Women's Doubles	Anika Dörr / Laura Wich; Germany University of Duisburg-Essen	Anastasia Dobrynina / Viktoriia Vorobeva; Russia Volga Regiona State Academy	Catarina Cristina / Vania Leca; Portugal Nova University	Sandra Emrich / Mona Lea Reich; Germany University of Mainz
2013	Women's Singles	Anika Dörr; Germany University of Duisburg-Essen	Mona Lea Reich; Germany Mainz University	Manuela Diaz; Spain University of Granada	Sonia Olariu; Romania University of Medicine and Pharmacy, Timișoara
2013	Men's Doubles	Mikhail Loktev / Vadim Novoselov; Russia Saratov State University	Sebastian Gransbo / Peter Nordin; Sweden Stockholm University	Joachim Areskär / Richard Eidestedt; Sweden Uppsala University	Fabian Hammes / Hannes Käsbauer; Germany University of Saarland
2013	Men's Singles	Sven Eric Kastens; Germany University of Saarland	Alexander Roovers; Germany University of Duisburg-Essen	Sylvain Ternon; France Universität Rouen	Mathieu Pohl; Germany University of Saarland
2013	Mixed Doubles	Anton Kaisti / Sanna Rautala; Finland University of Helsinki	Ryhor Varabyou / Viktoriia Vorobeva; Russia Volga Region State Academy	Karolina Kotte / Sebastian Gransbo; Sweden Stockholm University	Peter Nordin / Kristina Roman; Sweden Uppsala University
2013	Team	Finland University of Helsinki	France University of Rouen	Russia Volga Region State Academy of Physical Culture, Sport and Tourism	Sweden Stockholm University
2014	Women's Doubles	Cemre Fere / Neslihan Kiliç; Turkey Uludag University	Anika Dörr / Linda Efler; Germany University of Duisburg-Essen	Darya Samarchants / Yelyzaveta Zharka; Ukraine University of Kharkiv	Aleksandra Walaszek / Aneta Wojtkowska; Poland University of Opole
2014	Women's Singles	Cheriakova Anastasiia Russia University of Nizhny Novgorod	Neslihan Yigit Turkey Uludag University	Darya Samarchants Ukraine University of Kharkiv	Ana Moura Portugal University of Coimbra
2014	Men's Doubles	Jordan Corvee / William Goudaillier; France University of Bordeaux	Jim Middelburg / Lester Oey; Netherlands Radboud University of Nijmegen	Vitaliy Konov / Kyryll Nesterenko; Ukraine University of Kharkov	Mateusz Dubowski / Przemyslaw Urban; Poland University of Opole
2014	Men's Singles	Alexander Roovers Germany University of Duisburg-Essen	Mateusz Dubowski Poland University of Opole	Tobias Wadenka Germany Saarland University	Adrian Dziolko Poland University of Opole
2014	Mixed Doubles	Vitaliy Konov / Yelyzaveta Zharka; Ukraine University of Kharkiv	Jim Middelburg / Judith Campman; Netherlands Radboud University of Nijmegen	Javier Sanchez Soler / Marina Fernandez; Spain University of Granada	Adrian Dziolko / Aneta Wojtkowska; Poland University of Opole
2014	Team	Germany University of Duisburg-Essen	Turkey Uludag University 1	Netherlands Radboud University Nijmegen	Russia Saratov State University
2015	Women's Doubles	Özge Bayrak / Neslihan Yiğit; Turkey Uludağ University	Delphine Delrue / Lauranne Rosello; France University of Bordeaux	Weronika Grudzina / Anna Szymańska; Poland University of Warsaw	Charlie Sehier / Morgane Tessier; France University of Rouen
2015	Women's Singles	Özge Bayrak Turkey Uludağ University	Neslihan Yiğit Turkey Uludağ University	Weronika Grudzina Poland University of Warsaw	Anastasia Cherviakova Russia University of Nizhny Novgorod
2015	Men's Doubles	Mateusz Dubowski / Paweł Pietryja; Poland Opole University	Grégor Dunikowski / Thomas Vallez; France University of Bordeaux	Antoine Bébin / Corentin Lecerf; France University of Rouen	Sebastian Rduch / Tobias Wadenka; Germany Saarland University
2015	Men's Singles	Mateusz Dubowski Poland Opole University	Sinan Zorlu Turkey University of Opole	Vincent Medina France University of Bordeaux	Tobias Wadenka Germany Saarland University
2015	Mixed Doubles	Paweł Pietryja / Aneta Wojtkowska; Poland Opole University	Thomas Vallez / Delphine Delrue; France University of Bordeaux	Corentin Lecerf / Morgane Tessier; France University of Rouen	Rodion Kargaev / Anastasia Cherviakova; Russia University of Nizhny Novgorod
2015	Team	Turkey Uludağ University	France University of Bordeaux	Poland University of Opole	Russia University of Nizhny Novgorod
