= MAZ-541 =

Overview
- Manufacturer: MAZ
- Production: 1956; Three produced
- Assembly: Minsk Automobile Plant

Body and chassis
- Body style: Aircraft tug
- Layout: F4 layout/FR layout

Powertrain
- Engine: 38.8L D-12A V12 diesel, 500 bhp
- Transmission: 3-speed manual + 2-speed auxiliary gearbox

Dimensions
- Length: 7,797 mm (307.0 in)
- Width: 3,400 mm (133.9 in)
- Height: 2,802 mm (110.3 in)
- Curb weight: 28,230 kg (62,236 lb)

The MAZ-541 was a Soviet aircraft tug.

== History ==
Conventional trucks were previously used to tow aircraft, but with the appearance of the Tu-104 and Tu-114, more powerful vehicles were needed. MAZ-535 tractors were used, but its height required a longer tow bar; as a result, maneuverability worsened as the tractor often had to turn around and reconnect. This not only caused flight delays, but also created an unsafe environment at the airport. Development of the MAZ-541 started in 1956.

It was reportedly used at Sheremetyevo International Airport.

== Design ==
Based on the MAZ-525 truck, the MAZ-541 had rear wheels from the MAZ-525 and front wheels from the YaAZ-214. The engine was also from the MAZ-525. There were only three produced, which were in use until 1970. Another ten units were planned, but with the increasing weight of newer airliners, they were never built.
