= MAZ-525 =

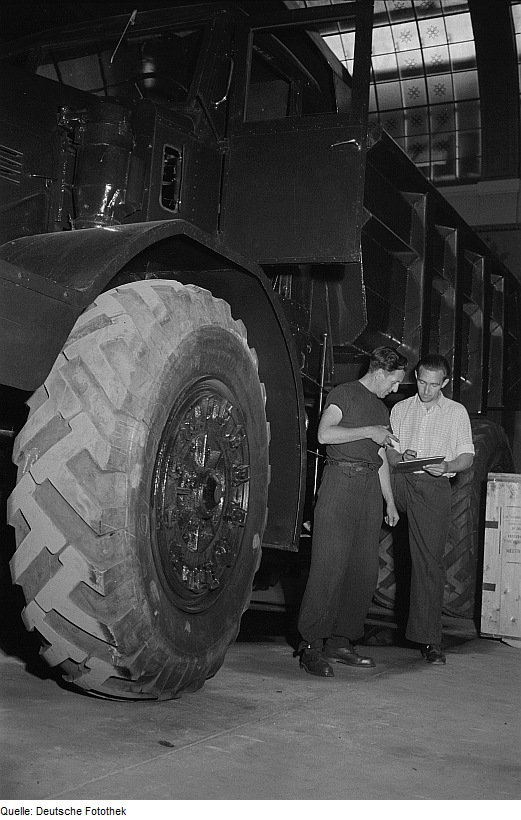

Overview
- Manufacturer: MAZ (1950–1959); BelAZ (1959–1965)
- Also called: BelAZ-525 (1959–1965)
- Production: 1950–1965
- Assembly: Minsk (1950–1959); Zhodino (1959–1965)

Body and chassis
- Class: Mining truck
- Layout: FR layout
- Related: MAZ-530

Powertrain
- Engine: 38.8L D-12A V12 diesel
- Transmission: 4-speed (5-speed since 1952) hydromechanical with an additional clutch petal

Dimensions
- Wheelbase: 4,780 mm (188 in)
- Length: 8,335 mm (328 in)
- Width: 3,220 mm (127 in)
- Height: 3,675 mm (145 in)
- Curb weight: 24,380 kg (53,749 lb)

Chronology
- Successor: BelAZ-580

MAZ-525 (BelAZ-525 from 1959) was a Soviet heavy truck produced by the Minsk Automobile Plant. Development started in 1949 at the Yaroslavl Automobile Plant Design Bureau as the YaAZ-225. It was planned to install a cab from the YaAZ-200, offset to the left. Further technical documentation was passed on to MAZ where the design was substantially enhanced.

== Appearance ==
The cab appearance changed slightly during production. On the early models, the hood was the same width as the cab; in the later editions, it became much narrower. Initially, a guard was installed on the hood sides for safety while the engine was serviced, but it was later removed.

== Variants ==
In 1952, the MAZ-E-525D was developed to work in tandem with a 15 m^{3} (530 cu ft) D-189 tractor-scraper. In 1954, the joint efforts of MAZ, Institute of Mining and Kharkov Trolleybus Depot developed a trolley dump truck equipped with two D-202 trolleybus electric motors with a total capacity of 172 kW (231 hp). In 1964, NAMI developed a similar truck called the DTU-25. In 1959, the MAZ-525 was used as a basis for the MAZ-541 aircraft tug, of which three were built. Also in 1959, the MAZ-525A tractor was developed as part of a road train with the 45-ton BelAZ-5271 semitrailer, but this did not enter production because the engine was not powerful enough.

== Production moved ==
In 1959, production was transferred to the Belarusian Automobile Plant, where the truck was produced until 1965 under the name BelAZ-525.

== Use ==
The truck continued to operate until the early 1970s.
