= MAZ-530 =

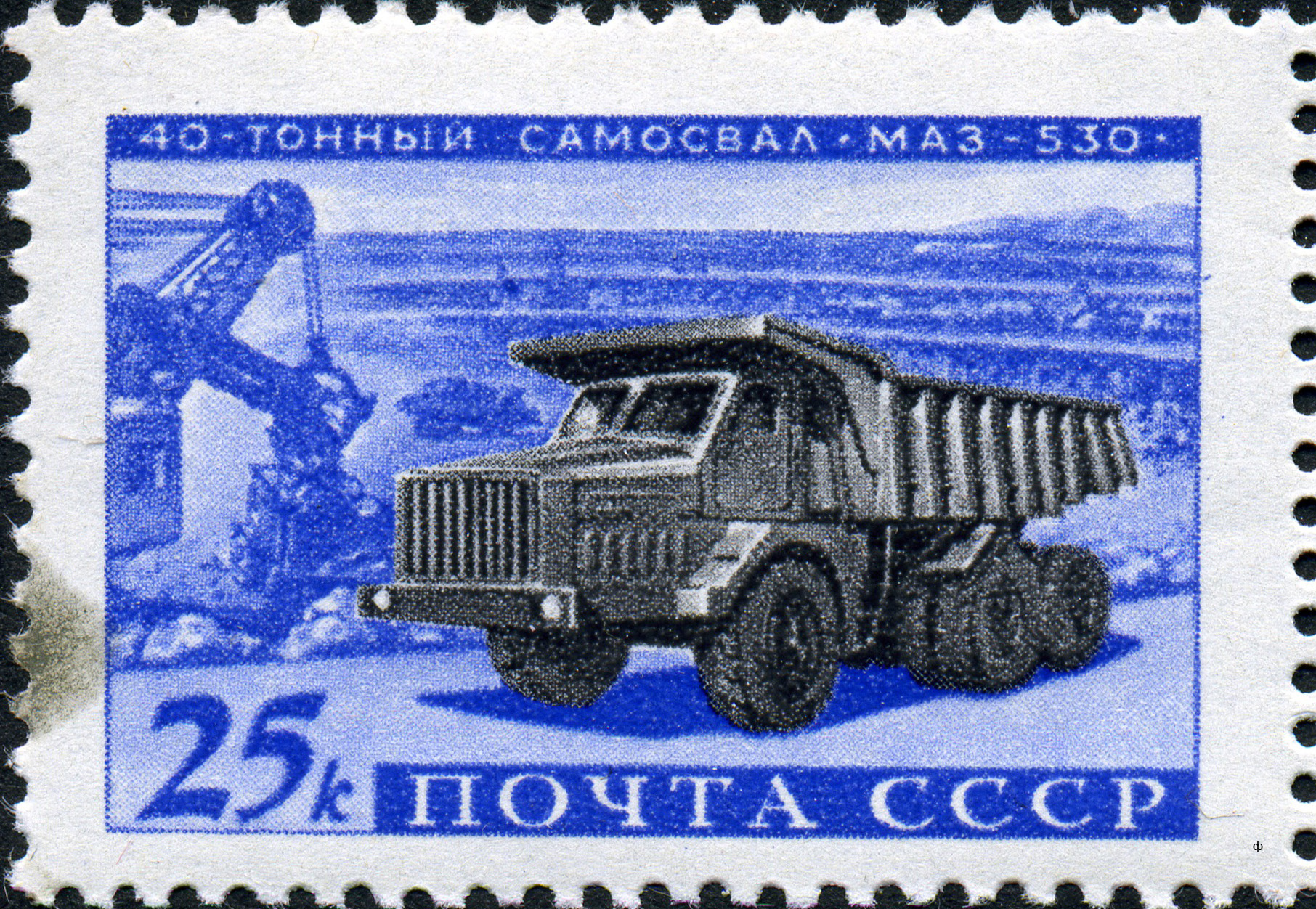

Overview
- Manufacturer: MAZ (1957-1960); BelAZ (1960-1963)
- Also called: BelAZ-530
- Production: 1957-1963
- Assembly: Minsk (1957-1960); Zhodino (1960-1963)

Body and chassis
- Body style: mining dump
- Layout: Front engine, rear-wheel drive layout

Powertrain
- Engine: 38.8L D-12A-450 V12 diesel
- Transmission: 3-speed manual transmission

Dimensions
- Length: 10,520 mm (414.2 in)
- Width: 3,460 mm (136.2 in)
- Height: 3,670 mm (144.5 in)
- Curb weight: 38,400 kg (84,658 lb)

Chronology
- Successor: BelAZ-548

The MAZ-530 is a Soviet-era heavy-duty dump truck with 6×4 wheels, produced at the Minsk Automobile Plant and Belarusian Automobile Works from 1957 to 1960 and from 1960 to 1963, respectively.

== History ==
In the 1950s the USSR manufactured biaxial MAZ-525 dump trucks with 25-ton carrying capacity. In the mid-1950s the MAZ plant created a larger model. The MAZ-530 had a similar layout to the MAZ-525, but becomes triaxial, thereby giving increasing payload capacity by 15 tons. The new model had a more powerful diesel V-shaped 12-cylinder D-12-450 450 horsepower (340 kW) engine. The new machine had two rear driving axles with an equalizer suspension, a frame representing the box beam and oversized tires 18.00-32.

The first prototype was ready in early March 1957. It appeared at the All-Soviet Agricultural exhibition in Moscow. The 1958 MAZ-530 was exhibited at the World Industrial Exhibition in Brussels (Belgium), where it was awarded the Grand Prix. In 1960 production of MAZ-530 was transferred to a new car factory BelAZ in the village of Zhodino near Minsk. As of 1963 three dozen MAZ/BelAZ-530 had been produced.

== Project evaluation ==
Comparable trucks were made only in the United States. It was the first and only 6×4 heavy dump truck in the USSR. MAZ-530 had good prospects, but was too late, as the layout of the 1960s was obsolete. The BelAZ Design Bureau began the development of fundamentally new various capacity dump trucks, so the MAZ-530 was discontinued. Cumulative production of 30 units was minuscule. No specimens remain.
