= Konstantin Chelpan =

Soviet engineer (1899–1938)

- Константин Челпан
- Born: 27 May 1899; Cherdakly, Yekaterinoslav Governorate, Russian Empire
- Died: 10 March 1938 (aged 38); Kharkiv, Ukraine SSR, Soviet Union
- Resting place: Unknown
- Education: Kharkiv Technological Institute
- Children: Lenimir Konstantinovich Chelpan
- Parent(s): Fyodor Myhailovich Chelpan, Elizaveta Khalangot
- Engineering career
- Discipline: Diesel engines
- Institutions: Kharkiv Locomotive Factory
- Significant design: V-2 engine
- Awards: Order of Lenin

Konstantin Fyodorovich Chelpan (Russian: Константин Фёдорович Челпан; 27 May 1899 – 10 March 1938) was a prominent Soviet engineer of Greek background. Head of the Engineering Design Bureau of the Kharkiv Locomotive Factory, chief designer of the T-34 tank engine. Awarded the Order of Lenin, he was politically repressed and executed under a mass persecution ordered by Joseph Stalin, but politically rehabilitated after death.

== Early life and education ==
Born on 27 May 1899 in Cherdakly, Yekaterinoslav Governorate, Russian Empire (now Kremenivka, Donetsk Oblast, Ukraine), to Fyodor Myhailovich Chelpan and Elizaveta Khalangot. Both parents were Greeks.

After graduating from Mariupol Realschule in 1919, took part in the Russian Civil War. In 1924, he graduated with honors from Kharkiv Technological Institute with a major in internal combustion engines.

== Career ==
From 1924 to 1937 Chelpan worked at the Kharkiv Locomotive Factory as a Designer, Head of the Diesel Department, Lead Designer, and Head of the Engineering Design Bureau. In 1928–1929 he received practical training in Germany, Switzerland, and the UK.

Konstantin Chelpan was the head designer of the famous T-34 tank diesel engine V-2, for which he was awarded the Order of Lenin. The engine consisted of lightweight aluminum alloy.

From 1927, he was a senior lecturer at Kharkiv Technological Institute.

== Arrest and death ==
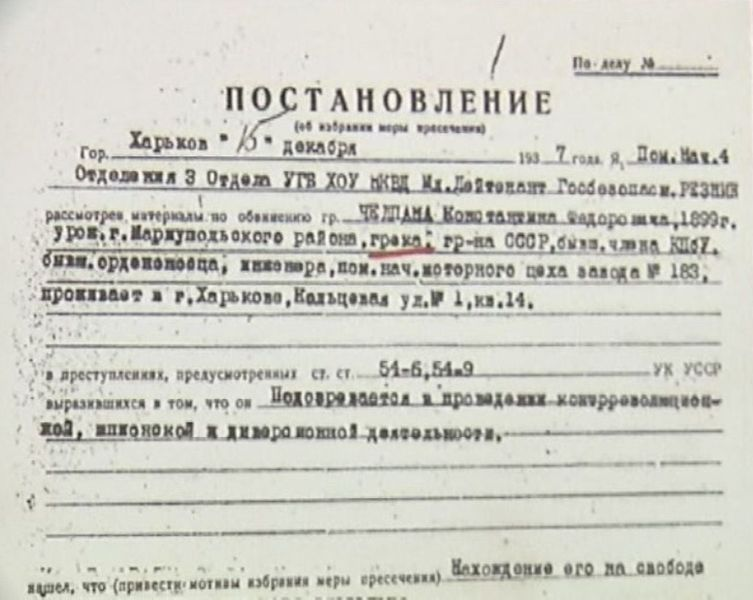
Konstantin Chelpan Arrest Warrant

Konstantin Chelpan was arrested on 15 December 1937 during the first days of the Greek Operation of NKVD. He was charged with leading a Greek nationalist counter-revolutionary organization, as well as conspiring to sabotage the Kharkiv Locomotive Factory. After being interrogated and tortured, he confessed to being a spy. On 4 February 1938, he was sentenced to execution by shooting. The sentence was carried out in Kharkiv prison on 10 March 1938 and covered up. In a few years his wife received a death certificate, indicating that Konstantin Chelpan died on 16 May 1942 from congestive heart failure.

On 6 August 1956, Konstantin Chelpan was rehabilitated by the Military Collegium of the Supreme Court of the USSR. However, only in 1988 was his true cause of death revealed.

== Commemoration ==
- In 1994 one of the streets in the village of Cherdakly was named after Konstantin Chelpan.
- In 2000 a book entitled Life story of famous Ukrainian Greeks. The case of Konstantin Chelpan by G. Zakharova was published.
- In 2001 a commemorative plaque was placed on the house, where Konstantin Chelpan had spent his last years.
