= Sashina Vignes Waran =

French badminton player

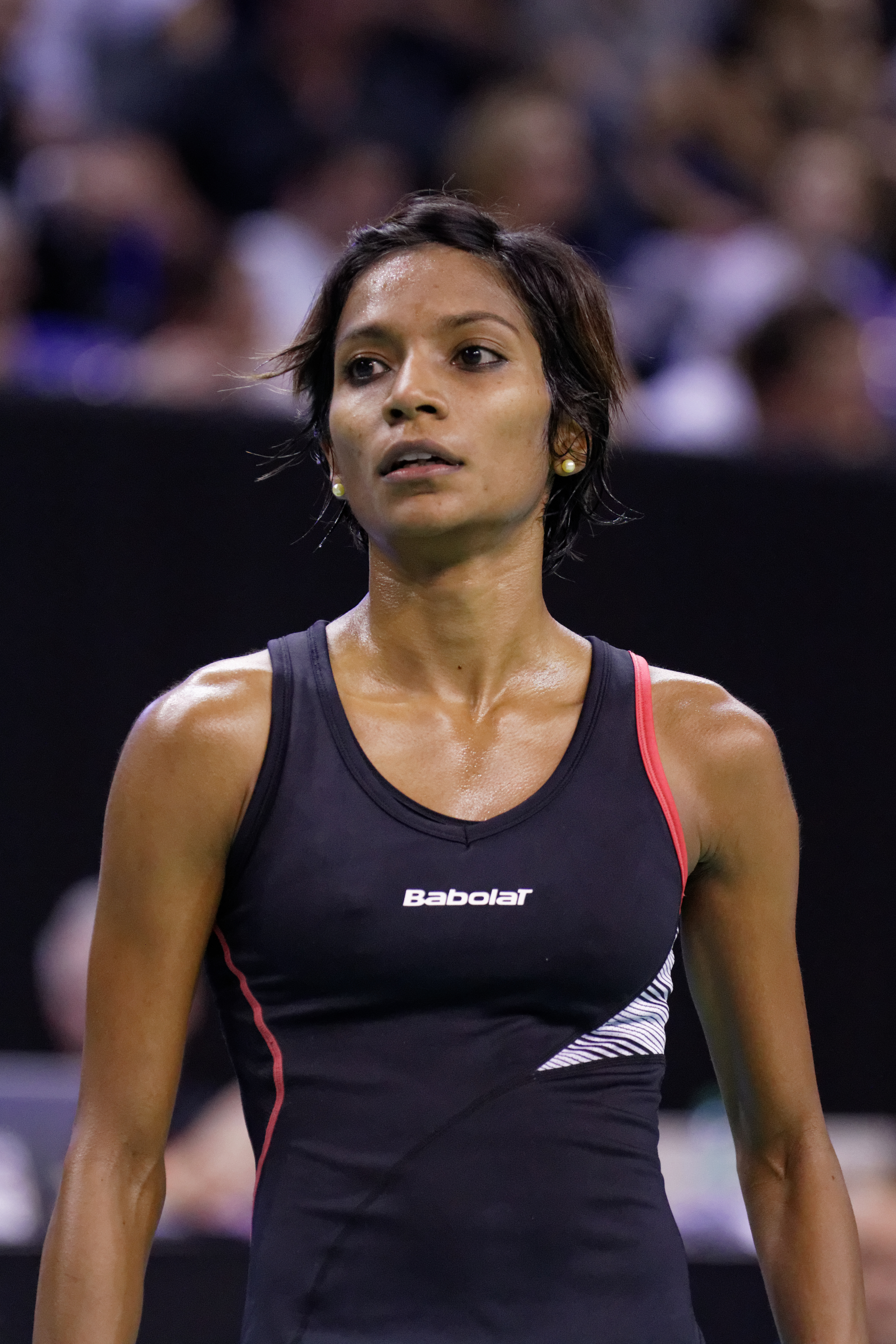

Personal information
- Born: 3 August 1988 (age 38) Kuala Lumpur, Malaysia
- Height: 1.68 m (5 ft 6 in)

Sport
- Country: France
- Sport: Badminton
- Handedness: Right

Women's singles & doubles
- Highest ranking: 30 (WS 13 June 2013); 70 (WD 10 December 2009; 317 (XD 13 September 2012)
- BWF profile

Sashina Vignes Waran (born 3 August 1988) is a French badminton player. She won the French National Badminton Championships Women's singles title twice. (2014 & 2015). She also won a bronze medal in doubles in 2014 with her sister Teshana Vignes Waran. She was teamcaptain of ASPTT Strasbourg in the French league. She was originally Malaysian and became naturalized French on 21 August 2013 after living in France for over 9 years together with her sister Teshana Vignes Waran, at that time also a professional badminton player.

== Biography ==
=== Youth ===
Sashina Vignes Waran comes from a family of Indian descent and Hindu religion. Born and raised in Malaysia, Sashina Vignes Waran and her sister, Teshana, who is a year younger, were educated with the idea that moving to Europe would give them more opportunities for success in their discipline. Their mother Ms. Shanta Vignes Waran, an ex-banker in Kuala Lumpur founded the Oncourt Sports International Badminton Academy at the Selayang Mall Badminton Centre in 1999 when she noticed a deep interest and craving from her children to play badminton when they were eight years old.

=== Arrival in France and first victories ===
In 2003, Sashina Vignes Waran met her future French trainer, Julien Fuchs, during a trip to Malaysia for a badminton course. The two sisters left for France in 2004. They were then housed at the Center for Sports Resources, Expertise and Performance (CREPS) in Alsace and joined the ASPTT Strasbourg, where Julien Fuchs worked.

Taking advantage of free French courses especially for foreign minors, Sashina Vignes Waran learns the French language in eight months. She obtained her scientific baccalaureate in 2009. After completing two years of applied foreign language training, she obtained a university degree in 2014 in the management of a professional sports career. Then, in the third year, she went on to do a Masters in Marketing and Communication at the Higher School of Business and Management (ESCM) in Strasbourg. In 2017-2018 she completed a Master 2 Marketing at the University of Strasbourg.

Sashina Vignes Waran took her first steps on the international circuit in 2009 by participating in the Irish International Challenge. In 2011, she captured her first title by winning the Portuguese International Open. In 2012, she won the Belgian International Open and the Norwegian International Open. She has also been crowned French university champion in singles for these two years. She won the Women's Singles event at the 2010 European Universities Badminton Championships and took a bronze medal with her sister Teshana in the Women's Doubles event. Asked by the Malaysian Federation to participate in the 2012 Summer Olympics in London, she declines due to her attachment to France. "My life is here", she told Le Monde about this episode.

=== French Naturalization and Dedication ===
After two unsuccessful applications, Sashina Vignes Waran and her sister, Teshana, were granted French citizenship on 21 August 2013. For their naturalization procedures, the two sisters received the support of the Minister of Sport, Valérie Fourneyron, who took the matter to heart after their appearance in the television program Stade 2, on France 2, in November 2012. The ceremony for the awarding of their certificates of French nationality took place on 18 November 2013.

In February 2014 Sashina Vignes Waran wears the jersey of the French badminton team for the first time at the European Team Championships in Basel, Switzerland. Although she was still licensed with ASPTT Strasbourg, she joined her sister Teshana at INSEP in September 2014, but returned to her old club after a few months. Sashina Vignes Waran was crowned French badminton champion in singles in 2014 and 2015 and was bronze medalist in doubles in 2014 with her sister Teshana Vignes Waran

=== First injury and return to competition ===
On 28 March 2015, during a quarterfinal round of the Orléans Masters Tournament, she suffered a complete rupture of the anterior cruciate ligament, medial collateral and medial patellar retinaculum in her left leg, requiring surgery. This happened successfully on 10 April 2015. Sashina Vignes Waran resumed training in June of the same year, despite using crutches.

During her closure, Sashina Vignes Waran signed an image contract with the French division of the insurance company MetLife until the end of 2016. As part of the performance pact initiated by the Ministry of City, Youth and Sports, this contract aims to guarantee a long-term professional retraining within this company. She declared, for 20 minutes every day that she wished to integrate "the communication department" of the company.

After 7 months absence, Sashina Vignes Waran returned to international competition in October 2015, on the occasion of the Bitburger Open 2015 in Saarbrücken. She hoped to return to her best level for the European Championship in April 2016 and by achieving qualification for the Olympic Games in Rio de Janeiro by remaining the best French in the women's singles world ranking at the end of that qualifying period. In January 2016 she made an appeal for donations of 4000 € online through the crowdfunding platform Sponsorise.me. This amount should have enabled her to fund her travels to numerous tournaments around the world to qualify for that Summer Olympics in Rio de Janeiro.

=== Second injury and return to competition ===
After a poor reception, Sashina Vignes Waran suffered another knee injury during the final of the 2016 French Badminton Championship, forcing her to retire. She was forced to be absent from the field for at least two months and was unable to compete in the 2016 Summer Olympics. “Every morning I got up for that, it's like it was taken from me. Now I need some time." She explains on this subject at the microphone of France Bleu Alsace.

Then on 7 January 2017 Sashina Vignes Waran made a winning comeback, after an 11-month absence, by winning in doubles partnering Olga Morozova, at a meeting of the French Interclub Badminton Championship between ASPTT Strasbourg and US Talence Badminton. She announced in February 2017 that she had not given up on her Olympic dream and still wanted to represent France at the Olympic Games in Tokyo. This did not materialize.

However, she has since withdrawn from training and continued to play a bit in Interclubs and in some international competitions. “I had to make a cut", she explained in May 2019.

=== Personal life ===
She got married in July 2019 to Philipp Discher and gave birth to a son Lukas in May 2020.

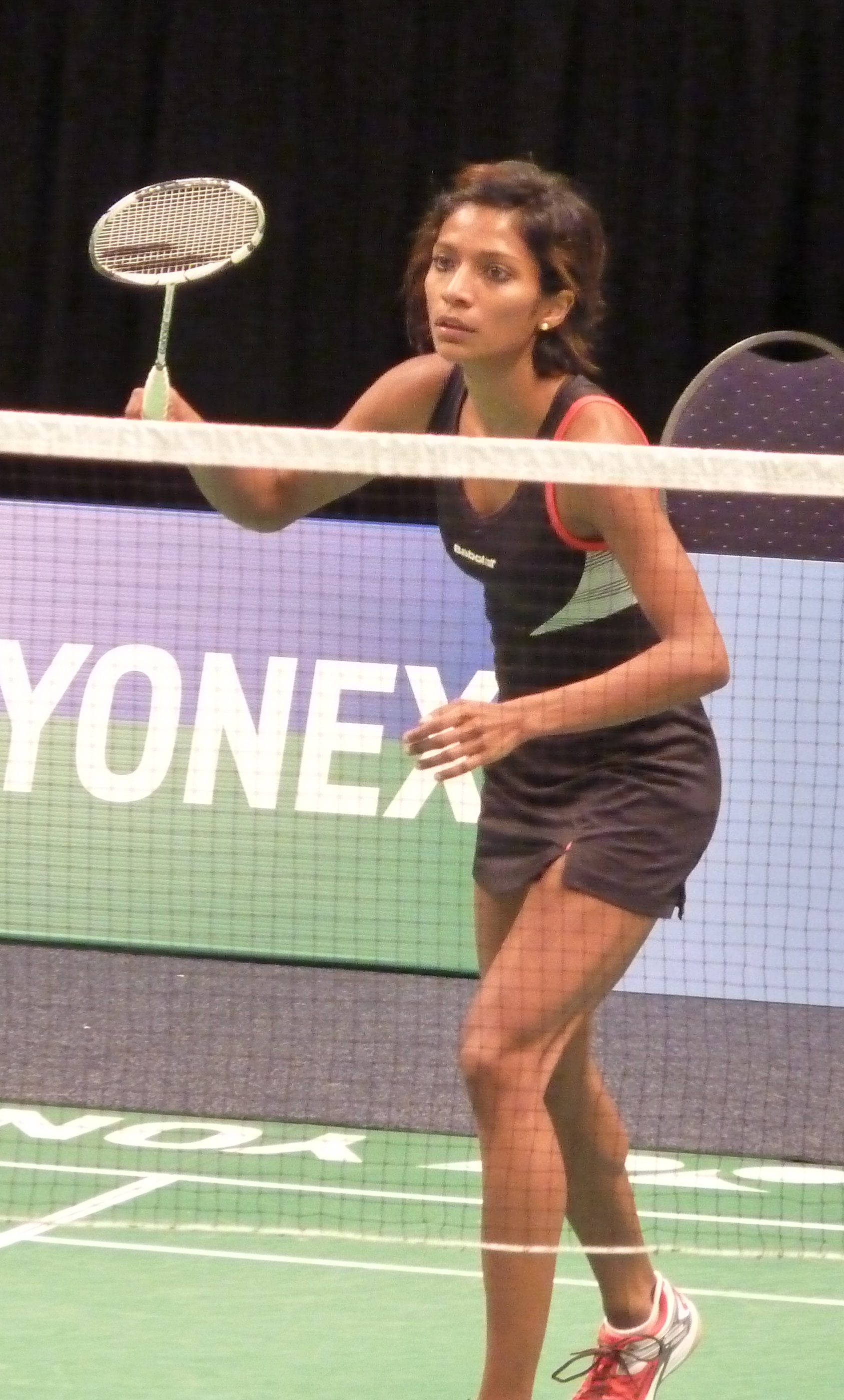
Vignes Waran at the 2013 Dutch Open

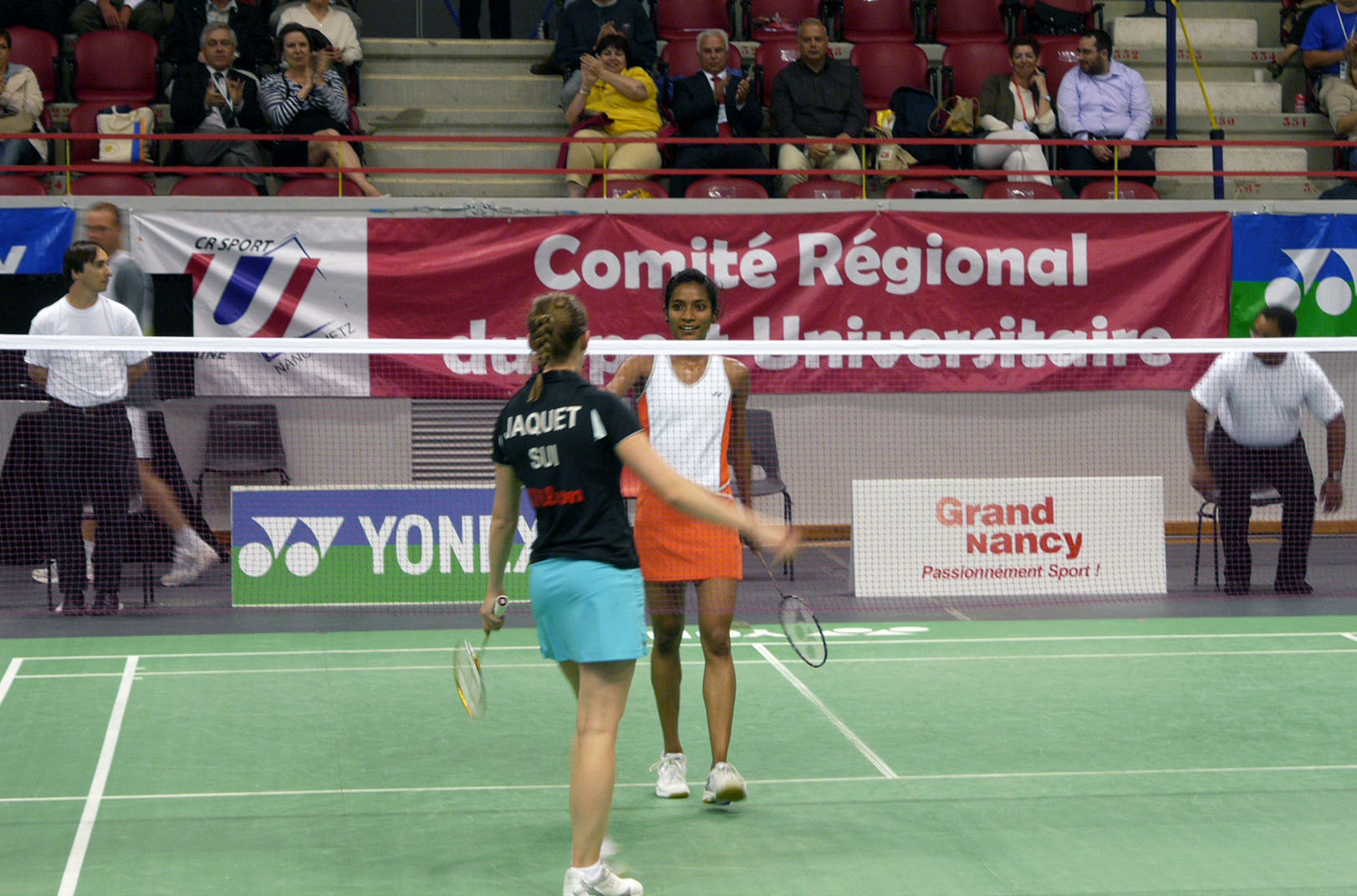
Sabrina Jaquet and Vignes Waran at the 2010 European University Championships finals

== Achievements ==
=== BWF International Challenge/Series ===
Women's singles
Year	Tournament	Opponent	Score	Result
2010	Czech International	(Denmark) Karina Jørgensen	22–24, 20–22	(silver) Runner-up
2011	Portugal International	(France) Atu Rosalina	21–11, 21–15	(gold) Winner
2012	Belgian International	(Germany) Karin Schnaase	15–21, 24–22, 17–9 retired	(gold) Winner
2012	Czech International	(Scotland) Kirsty Gilmour	18–21, 21–10, 13–21	(silver) Runner-up
2012	Norwegian International	(Bulgaria) Linda Zetchiri	18–21, 21–11, 21–17	(gold) Winner
2012	Turkey International	(Republic of Ireland) Chloe Magee	18–21, 21–23	(silver) Runner-up
2013	Tahiti International	(Thailand) Salakjit Ponsana	16–21, 21–12, 19–21	(silver) Runner-up
2014	Orléans International	(Spain) Beatriz Corrales	14–21, 13–21	(gold) Runner-up
2014	Italian International	(Spain) Beatriz Corrales	16–21, 21–17, 21–17	(gold) Winner

BWF International Challenge tournament
BWF International Series tournament
BWF Future Series tournament
