= 2009–10 European Badminton Circuit season =

The 2009-10 European Badminton Circuit season started in May 2009 and ended in May 2010.

== Results ==
=== Winners ===
| Circuit | Men's singles | Women's singles | Men's doubles | Women's doubles | Mixed doubles |
|---|---|---|---|---|---|
| Slovenian International | (England) Harry Wright | (Slovenia) Maja Tvrdy | (Austria) Jürgen Koch (Austria) Peter Zauner | (Germany) Johanna Goliszewski (Germany) Claudia Vogelgsang | (Austria) Peter Zauner (Austria) Simone Prutsch |
| Spanish International | (Denmark) Hans-Kristian Vittinghus | (India) Sayali Gokhale | (Denmark) Rasmus Bonde (Denmark) Mikkel Delbo Larsen | (Denmark) Line Damkjær Kruse (Denmark) Mie Schjøtt-Kristensen | (England) Robin Middleton (England) Mariana Agathangelou |
| Le Volant d'Or de Toulouse | (England) Rajiv Ouseph | (Russia) Ella Diehl | (England) Christopher Langridge (England) Robin Middleton | (Russia) Valeria Sorokina (Russia) Nina Vislova | (Poland) Robert Mateusiak (Poland) Nadieżda Kostiuczyk |
| St. Petersburg White Nights | (Ukraine) Dmytro Zavadsky | (Russia) Ella Diehl | (Russia) Vitalij Durkin (Russia) Aleksandr Nikolaenko | (Russia) Valeria Sorokina (Russia) Nina Vislova | (Indonesia) Flandy Limpele (Russia) Anastasia Russkikh |
| Belgian International | (Germany) Marc Zwiebler | (Netherlands) Yao Jie | (Netherlands) Ruud Bosch (Netherlands) Koen Ridder | (Japan) Misaki Matsutomo (Japan) Ayaka Takahashi | (England) Heather Olver (England) Marcus Ellis |
| Kharkiv International | (Ukraine) Dmytro Zavadsky | (Denmark) Anne Hald | (Russia) Andrey Ivanov (Russia) Andrej Ashmarin | (Ukraine) Anna Kobceva (Ukraine) Elena Prus | (Ukraine) Valeriy Atrashchenkov (Ukraine) Elena Prus |
| Czech International | (Czech Republic) Petr Koukal | (India) Trupti Murgunde | (Denmark) Mads Conrad-Petersen (Denmark) Mads Pieler Kolding | (Denmark) Maria Helsbol (Denmark) Anne Skelbaek | (Indonesia) Viki Indra Okvana (Indonesia) Gustiani Megawati |
| Bulgarian International | (Denmark) Rune Ulsing | (Bulgaria) Petya Nedelcheva | (Denmark) Kasper Faust Henriksen (Denmark) Anders Kristiansen | (Bulgaria) Petya Nedelcheva (Russia) Anastasia Russkikh | (Poland) Robert Mateusiak (Poland) Nadieżda Kostiuczyk |
| Cyprus International | (France) Simon Maunoury | (Slovenia) Spela Silvester | (Denmark) Christopher Bruun Jensen (Denmark) Morten T. Kronborg | (Russia) Anastasia Chervyakova (Russia) Natalia Perminova | (New Zealand) Henry Tam (New Zealand) Donna Haliday |
| Slovak International | (Italy) Wisnu Haryo Putro | (Belarus) Alesia Zaitsava | (Czech Republic) Ondrej Kopriva (Czech Republic) Tomas Kopriva | (Denmark) Maria Lykke Andersen (Denmark) Karina Sørensen | (Denmark) Mark Philip Winther (Denmark) Karina Sørensen |
| Hungarian International | (Germany) Dieter Domke | (Switzerland) Jeanine Cicognini | (Poland) Adam Cwalina (Poland) Wojciech Szkudlarczyk | (Russia) Tatjana Bibik (Russia) Olga Golovanova | (Poland) Wojciech Szkudlarczyk (Poland) Agnieszka Wojtkowska |
| Iceland International | (Denmark) Christian Lind Thomsen | (Iceland) Ragna Ingólfsdóttir | (Denmark) Anders Skaarup Rasmussen (Denmark) René Lindskow | (Iceland) Ragna Ingólfsdóttir (Iceland) Snjólaug Jóhannsdóttir | (Denmark) Theis Christiansen (Denmark) Joan Christiansen |
| Norwegian International | (Denmark) Hans-Kristian Vittinghus | (Germany) Juliane Schenk | (Denmark) Rasmus Bonde (Denmark) Simon Mollyhus | (Denmark) Helle Nielsen (Denmark) Marie Røpke | (England) Marcus Ellis (England) Heather Olver |
| Scottish Open | (Germany) Marc Zwiebler | (Scotland) Susan Egelstaff | (Denmark) Mads Conrad-Petersen (Denmark) Mads Pieler Kolding | (Russia) Valeria Sorokina (Russia) Nina Vislova | (Russia) Alexander Nikolaenko (Russia) Valeria Sorokina |
| Welsh International | (Denmark) Kristian Nielsen | (Russia) Tatjana Bibik | (Russia) Vitaliy Durkin (Russia) Alexandr Nikolaenko | (Russia) Valeria Sorokina (Russia) Nina Vislova | (Russia) Vitaliy Durkin (Russia) Nina Vislova |
| Irish Open | (Sweden) Henri Hurskainen | (Spain) Carolina Marín | (Denmark) Mads Conrad Petersen (Denmark) Mads Pieler Kolding | (England) Mariana Agathangelou (England) Heather Olver | (Denmark) Mikkel Delbo Larsen (Denmark) Mie Schjött Kristensen |
| Turkey International | (Finland) Ville Lang | (Turkey) Li Shuang | (Sweden) Joel Johansson-Berg (Indonesia) Imam Sodikin | (Sweden) Emelie Lennartsson (Sweden) Emma Wengberg | (Indonesia) Viki Indra Okvana (Indonesia) Gustiani Megawati |
| Swedish International | (Indonesia) Indra Bagus Ade Chandra | (Japan) Kaori Imabeppu | (England) Chris Langridge (England) Robin Middleton | (Denmark) Helle Nielsen (Denmark) Marie Röpke | (Denmark) Mads Pieler Kolding (Denmark) Britta Andersen |
| Austrian International | (Indonesia) Andre Kurniawan Tedjono | (Indonesia) Fransisca Ratnasari | (Indonesia) Viki Indra Okvana (Indonesia) Ardiansyah Putra | (Japan) Rie Eto (Japan) Yu Wakita | (Ukraine) Valeriy Atrashchenkov (Ukraine) Elena Prus |
| Croatian International | (England) Ben Beckman | (Germany) Nicole Grether | (Wales) Joe Morgan (Wales) James Phillips | (Germany) Nicole Grether (Canada) Charmaine Reid | (Croatia) Zvonimir Durkinjak (Croatia) Stasa Poznanovic |
| Romanian International | (Malaysia) Yeoh Kay Bin | (Japan) Hitomi Oka | (Austria) Jürgen Koch (Austria) Peter Zauner | (Singapore) Shinta Mulia Sari (Singapore) Yao Lei | (Singapore) Chayut Triyachart (Singapore) Yao Lei |
| Polish Open | (Spain) Pablo Abian | (Japan) Kana Ito | (Russia) Vladimir Ivanov (Russia) Ivan Sozonov | (Singapore) Shinta Mulia Sari (Singapore) Lei Yao | (Russia) Andrej Ashmarin (Russia) Anastasia Prokopenko |
| Dutch International | (Denmark) Rune Ulsing | (Denmark) Karina Jørgensen | (Denmark) Mads Conrad Petersen (Denmark) Mads Pieler Kolding | (Netherlands) Samantha Barning (Netherlands) Eefje Muskens | (Denmark) Anders Skaarup Rasmussen (Denmark) Anne Skelbaek |
| Finnish International | (Estonia) Raul Must | (Russia) Anastasia Prokopenko | (France) Sebastien Vincent (France) Laurent Constantin | (France) Barbara Matias (France) Elisa Chanteur | (Denmark) Mikkel Delbo Larsen (Denmark) Mie Schjøtt-Kristensen |
| Portugal International | (Malaysia) Kenn Lim | (Portugal) Telma Santos | (Denmark) Martin Kragh (Denmark) Anders Skaarup Rasmussen | (England) Lauren Smith (England) Alexandra Langley | (Croatia) Zvonimir Durkinjak (Croatia) Stasa Poznanovic |

=== Performance by countries ===
Tabulated below are the Circuit performances based on countries. Only countries who have won a title are listed:

| No. | Team | SLO | ESP | FRA | RUS | BEL | UKR | CZE | BUL | CYP | SVK | HUN | ISL | NOR | SCO | WLS | IRL | TUR | SWE | AUT | CRO | ROM | POL | NLD | FIN | POR | Total |
|---|---|---|---|---|---|---|---|---|---|---|---|---|---|---|---|---|---|---|---|---|---|---|---|---|---|---|---|
| 1 | Denmark | | 3 | | | | 1 | 2 | 2 | 1 | 2 | | 3 | 3 | 1 | 1 | 2 | | 2 | | | | | 4 | 1 | 1 | 29 |
| 2 | Russia | | | 2 | 4 | | 1 | | 1 | 1 | | 1 | | | 2 | 4 | | | | | | | 2 | | 1 | | 19 |
| 3 | England | 1 | 1 | 2 | | 1 | | | | | | | | 1 | | | 1 | | 1 | | 1 | | | | | 1 | 10 |
| 4 | Indonesia | | | | 1 | | | 1 | | | | | | | | | | 2 | 1 | 3 | | | | | | | 8 |
| 5 | Germany | 1 | | | | 1 | | | | | | 1 | | 1 | 1 | | | | | | 2 | | | | | | 7 |
| 6 | Japan | | | | | 1 | | | | | | | | | | | | | 1 | 1 | | 1 | 1 | | | | 5 |
| 6 | Ukraine | | | | 1 | | 3 | | | | | | | | | | | | | 1 | | | | | | | 5 |
| 8 | Poland | | | 1 | | | | | 1 | | | 2 | | | | | | | | | | | | | | | 4 |
| 9 | Austria | 2 | | | | | | | | | | | | | | | | | | | | 1 | | | | | 3 |
| 9 | France | | | | | | | | | 1 | | | | | | | | | | | | | | | 2 | | 3 |
| 9 | Netherlands | | | | | 2 | | | | | | | | | | | | | | | | | | 1 | | | 3 |
| 9 | Singapore | | | | | | | | | | | | | | | | | | | | | 2 | 1 | | | | 3 |
| 9 | Sweden | | | | | | | | | | | | | | | | 1 | 2 | | | | | | | | | 3 |
| 14 | Bulgaria | | | | | | | | 2 | | | | | | | | | | | | | | | | | | 2 |
| 14 | Croatia | | | | | | | | | | | | | | | | | | | | 1 | | | | | 1 | 2 |
| 14 | Czech Republic | | | | | | | 1 | | | 1 | | | | | | | | | | | | | | | | 2 |
| 14 | Iceland | | | | | | | | | | | | 2 | | | | | | | | | | | | | | 2 |
| 14 | India | | 1 | | | | | 1 | | | | | | | | | | | | | | | | | | | 2 |
| 14 | Malaysia | | | | | | | | | | | | | | | | | | | | | 1 | | | | 1 | 2 |
| 14 | Slovenia | 1 | | | | | | | | 1 | | | | | | | | | | | | | | | | | 2 |
| 14 | Spain | | | | | | | | | | | | | | | | 1 | | | | | | 1 | | | | 2 |
| 20 | Belarus | | | | | | | | | | 1 | | | | | | | | | | | | | | | | 1 |
| 20 | Canada | | | | | | | | | | | | | | | | | | | | 1 | | | | | | 1 |
| 20 | Estonia | | | | | | | | | | | | | | | | | | | | | | | | 1 | | 1 |
| 20 | Finland | | | | | | | | | | | | | | | | | 1 | | | | | | | | | 1 |
| 20 | Italy | | | | | | | | | | 1 | | | | | | | | | | | | | | | | 1 |
| 20 | New Zealand | | | | | | | | | 1 | | | | | | | | | | | | | | | | | 1 |
| 20 | Portugal | | | | | | | | | | | | | | | | | | | | | | | | | 1 | 1 |
| 20 | Scotland | | | | | | | | | | | | | | 1 | | | | | | | | | | | | 1 |
| 20 | Switzerland | | | | | | | | | | | 1 | | | | | | | | | | | | | | | 1 |
| 20 | Turkey | | | | | | | | | | | | | | | | | 1 | | | | | | | | | 1 |
| 20 | Wales | | | | | | | | | | | | | | | | | | | | 1 | | | | | | 1 |
