= Anne Skelbæk =

Danish badminton player

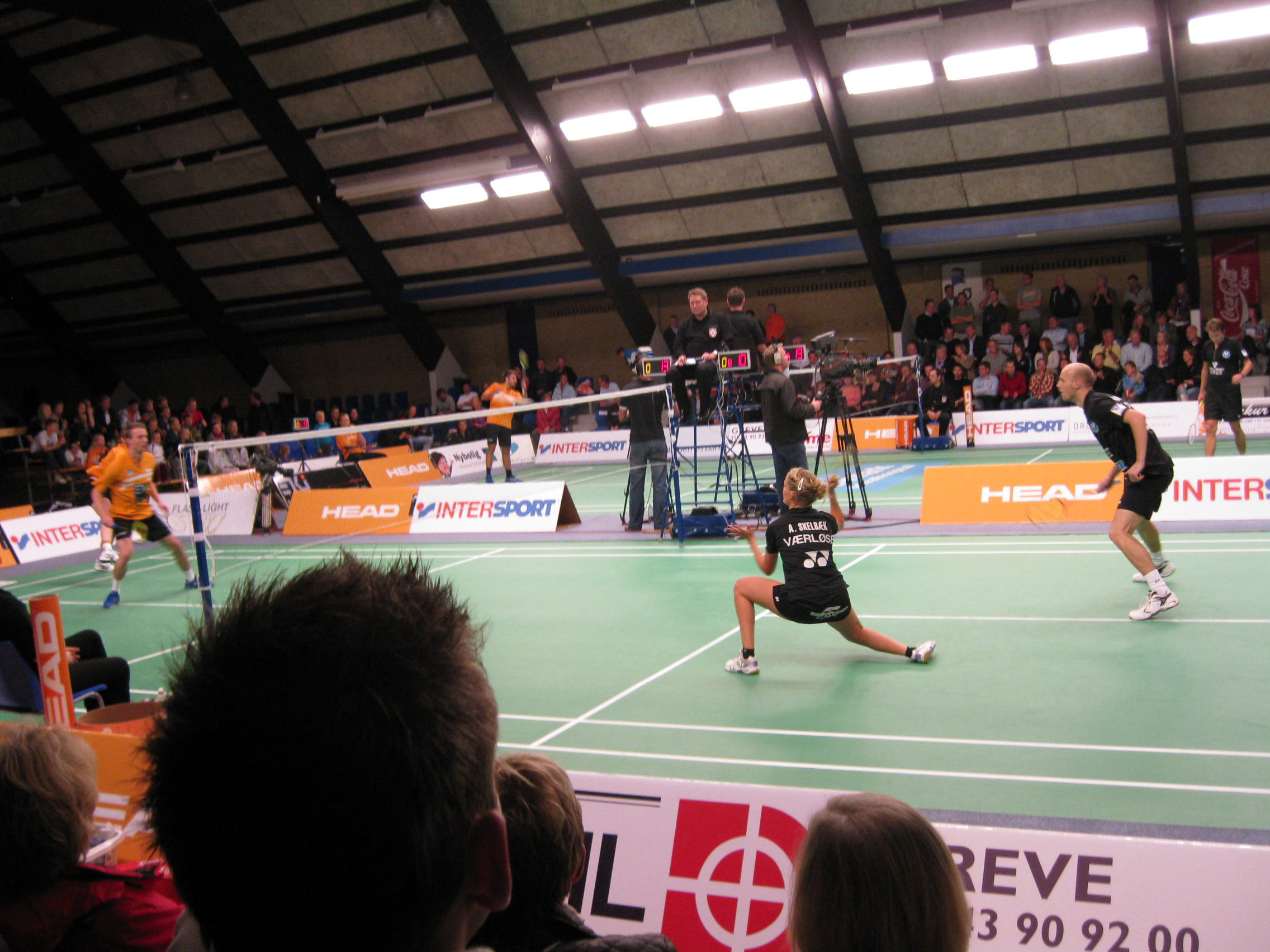

Personal information
- Born: 31 August 1990 (age 36)

Sport
- Country: Denmark
- Sport: Badminton

Women's & mixed doubles
- Highest ranking: 19 (WD) 26 May 2011; 56 (XD) 9 June 2011
- BWF profile
Medal record
Badminton
Representing Denmark
European Junior Championships
Gold medal – first place	2009 Milan	Mixed team

Anne Skelbæk (born 31 August 1990) is a Danish badminton player from the Værløse badminton club. In 2008, she has won some women's doubles title at the International Series tournament in Greece, Cyprus, and Czech Republic partnered with Maria Helsbøl. In 2010, she and Helsbøl also won the 2009–10 European Circuit Finals. Teamed-up with Anders Skaarup Rasmussen in the mixed doubles, they won the Dutch and Czech International Challenge tournament.

== Achievements ==
=== BWF International Challenge/Series ===
Women's Doubles
Year	Tournament	Partner	Opponent	Score	Result
2011	Denmark International	(Denmark) Maria Helsbøl	(Denmark) Line Damkjaer Kruse (Denmark) Marie Roepke	14–21, 14–21	(silver) Runner-up
2010	Irish International	(Denmark) Maria Helsbøl	(England) Mariana Agathangelou (England) Heather Olver	12–21, 21–12, 21–15	(gold) Winner
2010	Czech International	(Denmark) Maria Helsbøl	(Netherlands) Selena Piek (Netherlands) Iris Tabeling	20–22, 21–15, 7–21	(silver) Runner-up
2010	Dutch International	(Denmark) Maria Helsbøl	(Netherlands) Samantha Barning (Netherlands) Eefje Muskens	8–21, 18–21	(silver) Runner-up
2009	Irish International	(Denmark) Maria Helsbøl	(England) Mariana Agathangelou (England) Heather Olver	13–21, 19–21	(silver) Runner-up
2009	Czech International	(Denmark) Maria Helsbøl	(Switzerland) Marion Gruber (Switzerland) Sabrina Jaquet	21–14, 21–10	(gold) Winner
2008	Cyprus International	(Denmark) Maria Helsbøl	(Poland) Natalia Pocztowiak (Poland) Aleksandra Walaszek	21–12, 21–17	(gold) Winner
2008	Hellas International	(Denmark) Maria Helsbøl	(Turkey) Ezgi Epice (Turkey) Aprilsasi Putri Lejarsar Variella	21–19, 21–19	(gold) Winner
2007	Hellas International	(Denmark) Maria Helsbøl	(Bulgaria) Diana Dimova (Bulgaria) Petya Nedelcheva	14–21, 15–21	(silver) Runner-up

Mixed Doubles
Year	Tournament	Partner	Opponent	Score	Result
2010	Czech International	(Denmark) Anders Skaarup Rasmussen	(Netherlands) Jelle Maas (Netherlands) Iris Tabeling	21–16, 21–11	(gold) Winner
2010	Dutch International	(Denmark) Anders Skaarup Rasmussen	(Denmark) Christian John Skovgaard (Denmark) Julie Houmann	21–17, 21–12	(gold) Winner
2009	Czech International	(Denmark) Mads Conrad-Petersen	(Indonesia) Indra Viki Okvana (Indonesia) Gustiani Megawati	11–21, 13–21	(silver) Runner-up
2009	Dutch International	(Denmark) Christian John Skovgaard	(Germany) Johannes Schoettler (Germany) Birgit Overzier	16–21, 10–21	(silver) Runner-up
2008	Cyprus International	(Denmark) Niklas Hoff	(Denmark) Peter Moerk (Denmark) Maria Helsbøl	14–21, 21–15, 24–26	(silver) Runner-up

BWF International Challenge tournament
BWF International Series tournament
