= Aleksandra Wałaszek =

Polish badminton player (born 1987)

Personal information
- Born: 1987

Sport
- Country: Poland
- Sport: Badminton

Women's
- Highest ranking: 256 (WS) 23 Jan 2014; 156 (WD) 8 Oct 2009; 450 (XD) 5 Jul 2012
- BWF profile

Aleksandra Wałaszek (born 1987) is a Polish female badminton player.

== Achievements ==
=== BWF International Challenge/Series ===
Women's Singles

Year	Tournament	Opponent	Score	Result
2013	Puerto Rico International	(Brazil) Lohaynny Vicente	21-19, 13–21, 18–21	(gold) Winner

Women's Doubles

Year	Tournament	Partner	Opponent	Score	Result
2008	Cyprus International	(Poland) Natalia Pocztowiak	(Denmark) Anne Skelbæk (Denmark) Maria Helsbøl	12–21, 17–21	(silver) Runner-up

BWF International Challenge tournament
BWF International Series tournament
