= Teshana Vignes Waran =

French badminton player (born 1989)

Personal information
- Born: 31 October 1989 (age 37) Kuala Lumpur, Malaysia

Sport
- Country: France
- Sport: Badminton

Women's singles & doubles
- Highest ranking: 171 (WS 31 March 2011); 60 (WD 10 April 2014); 99 (XD 30 May 2013)
- BWF profile

Teshana Vignes Waran (born 31 October 1989) is a French badminton player. She was originally Malaysian and became naturalized French on 21 August 2013 after living in France for over 9 years together with her sister Sashina Vignes Waran at that time also a professional badminton player.

== Biography ==
=== Youth ===
Teshana Vignes Waran comes from a family of Indian descent and Hindu religion. Born and raised in Malaysia, in a region where badminton is controlled by the Buddhist community, Teshana Vignes Waran and her sister, Sashina, who is a year older, were educated with the idea that moving to Europe would give them more opportunities for success in their discipline. Their mother Ms. Shanta Vignes Waran, an ex-banker in Kuala Lumpur founded the Oncourt Sports International Badminton Academy at the Selayang Mall Badminton Centre in 1999 when she noticed a deep interest and craving from her children to play badminton when they were eight years old.

== Achievements ==
=== BWF International Challenge/Series ===
Women's doubles
Year	Tournament	Partner	Opponent	Score	Result
2015	Mercosul International	(France) Laura Choinet	(Turkey) Özge Bayrak (Turkey) Neslihan Yiğit	10–21, 11–21	(silver) Runner-up
2015	Lithuanian International	(France) Marie Batomene	(Germany) Luise Heim (Germany) Yvonne Li	21–11, 21–7	(gold) Winner

Mixed doubles
Year	Tournament	Partner	Opponent	Score	Result
2013	Tahiti International	(France) Laurent Constantin	(Netherlands) Ruud Bosch (Thailand) Salakjit Ponsana	18–21, 15–21	(silver) Runner-up
2014	Romanian International	(France) Bastian Kersaudy	(Scotland) Martin Campbell (Scotland) Jillie Cooper	14–21, 15–21	(silver) Runner-up
2015	Lithuanian International	(Denmark) Søren Toft Hansen	(Russia) Andrey Parakhodin (Russia) Anastasia Chervyakova	21–14, 21–17	(gold) Winner

BWF International Challenge tournament
BWF International Series tournament
BWF Future Series tournament
