= Kharkiv Polytechnic Institute =

Public university in Kharkiv, Ukraine

Coordinates: 50°00′N 36°15′E

National Technical University "Kharkiv Polytechnic Institute"
- Національний технічний університет "Харківський політехнічний інститут"
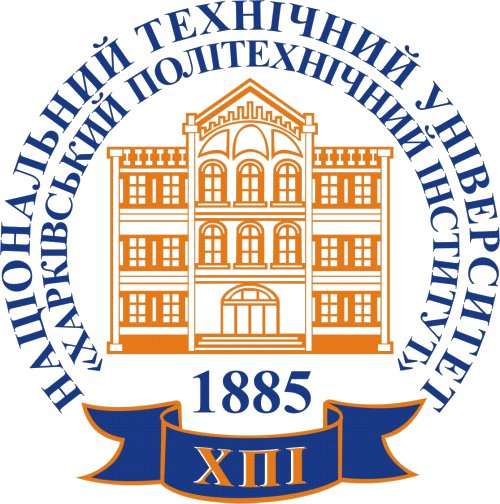
- Motto: Unition of education, science and business
- Type: Public university
- Established: 1885
- Affiliations: Ministry of Education and Science of Ukraine
- Academic affiliations: IAU
- Rector: Dr.T.Sc., Prof. Yevgen Ivanovych Sokol
- Administrative staff: 3,700
- Students: 24,000 (as of 2006)
- Location: Kharkiv, Ukraine
- Campus: Urban
- Website: www.kpi.kharkov.ua/eng/
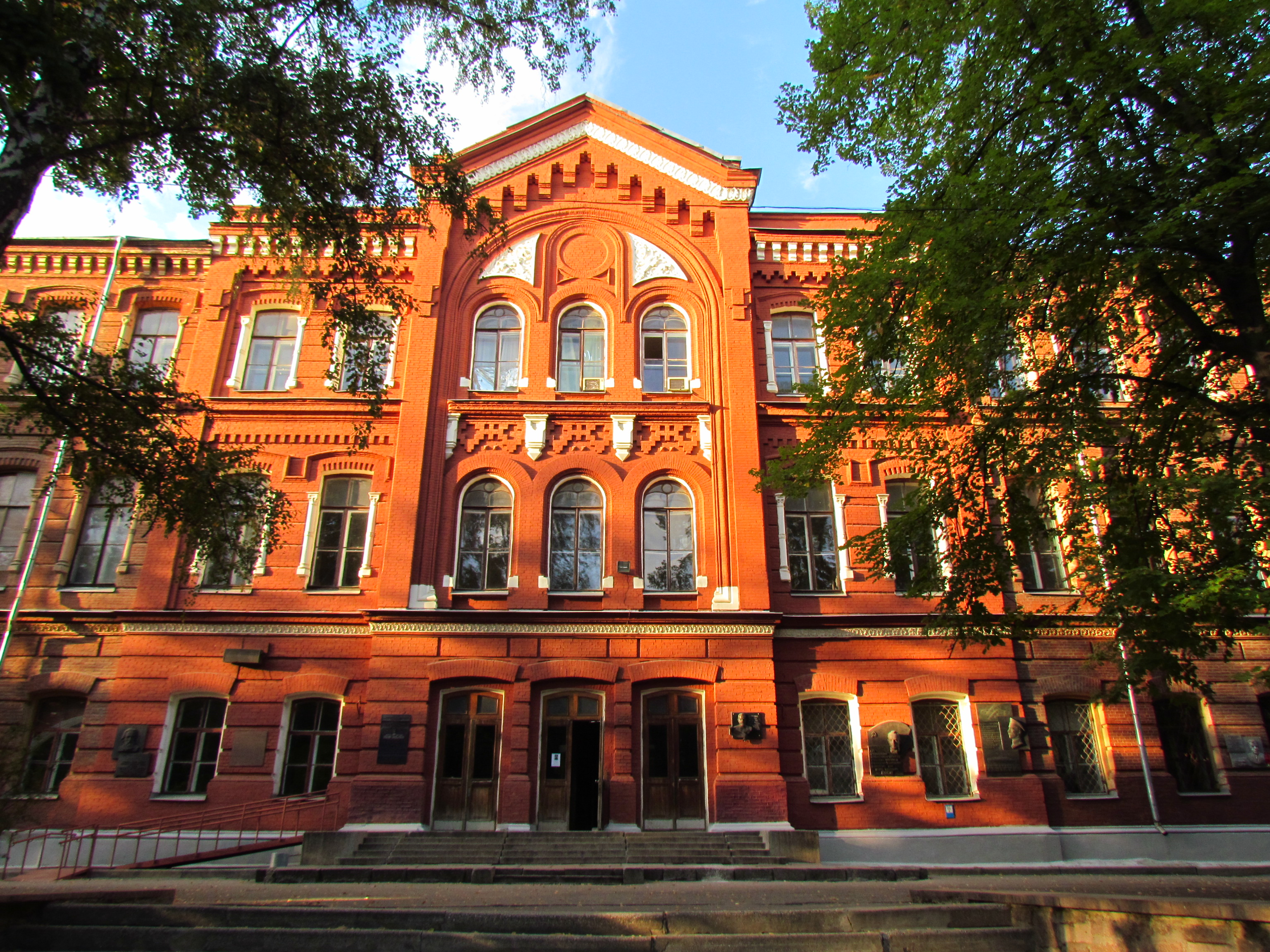

University rankings

Regional – Overall
- QS Emerging Europe and Central Asia: 105 (2022)

The Kharkiv Polytechnic Institute (abbr. KhPI, officially titled National Technical University "Kharkiv Polytechnic Institute", Ukrainian: Національний технічний університет «Харківський політехнічний інститут», abbr. НТУ "ХПІ") is a public technical university in Kharkiv, Ukraine.

Founded in 1885, it is the second-oldest technical university in the former Russian Empire (after Saint Petersburg State Institute of Technology). Also it is the second-oldest technical university in the modern Ukraine territory (after Lviv Polytechnic).

== History ==
The university was established according to the program for technical education in the Russian Empire set up by Dmitry Mendeleev as a Practical Technological Institute, with two departments (mechanical and chemical) which could offer training to 125 students. The organizer and first rector of the institute was Viktor Kyrpychov, an honored professor specializing in mechanics and resistance in materials. In 1898, the institute was renamed the Emperor Alexander III Technological Institute. After the October Revolution in 1917, the Technological Institute continued its work. In 1921 the institute set up the first department for workers (rabfak) in Ukraine, and in 1923 (at the request of students, teachers and employees) the institute was renamed for Vladimir Lenin. In 1929 the V.I. Lenin institute of Technology was renamed the Kharkiv V.I. Lenin Polytechnic Institute (KhPI), a name kept until the fall of the Soviet Union.

In 1930, five independent higher-educational institutions (for mechanical machine-engineering, electrical technology, chemical technology, engineering and construction, and aviation) were set up as five separate departments of the institute. KhPI, as a whole, temporarily ceased to exist after that. Still, historians consider these five institutions as informal branches sharing a common history. During World War II over 3,000 professors, students and institute employees joined the Army. Evacuated to Krasnoufimsk and Chirchiq, the institute continued training engineering staff; it also solved serious scientific problems related to strengthening national defense (such as contributing to tank-design work spearheaded by Alexander Morozov, one of the key engineers in T-34 design). In 1949 four higher-educational institutions (the institutes for mechanical machine-engineering, chemical technology, electrical technology and the institute of the cement industry) were reunited into the Kharkiv V.I.Lenin Polytechnic Institute. Professor Mikhail Semko was appointed its rector, and remained in this position for 30 years.

After the fall of the Soviet Union in 1991, KhPI continued its work as a Ukrainian institution of higher learning. In April 1994, the Cabinet of Ministers of Ukraine granted Kharkiv Polytechnic Institute university status and it was renamed the Kharkiv State Polytechnic University (KhSPU). In September 2000, the status of National Technical University has been given to KhSPU, by decree of the President of Ukraine; since then, it has had its current name (NTU "KhPI"). In February 2010, NTU "KhPI" was granted the status of Autonomous Research National University by decree of the Ukrainian Cabinet of Ministers.

== Status ==
NTU "KhPI" has been accredited as a university of the highest (IV) level. It trains full-time students in 91 fields and offers 69 fields for instruction by correspondence. It has the greatest number of matriculated students in eastern and southern Ukraine (4,377 places for full-time students and over 4,000 places for correspondence students). The university has 21 full-time departments, departments for correspondence and new full-time students, a center for foreign students, an inter-branch institute for advanced studies and three research and design institutes. It prepares specialists in the fields of machine-building, automation, electrical engineering, electronics, chemical engineering, control systems, management, computer science, software engineering and business.

== Campuses and buildings ==
The university consists of approximately 20 buildings. Most campuses are concentrated compactly — between "Pushkinskaya" and "Architect Beketov" underground stations. Campuses have changed shape over time. Old buildings were built, as usual in the 19th century, and functioned from the very inception of the institute. They are built of red brick and are of great architectural and even historical value. New buildings were built in the Soviet era and their dimensions correspond to concrete houses built at that time. They were built during 1960-1980s. There are two campuses in the university: main campus, where most of auditory and administrative buildings are situated and dormitory campus with not only student dormitories but with Student Palace — place for solemn events and student arts study groups training, and with Sports Complex. Among educational and administrative buildings there are: Main Building (residence of Rector's Office and some administrative services), Educational Buildings U-1 and U-2, Main Classroom Building, Chemistry building, Physics Building, Mathematics Building, Radio-electronic Building, Electrotechnical Building, Engineering Building, Technical Building, Computing Centre and Library Building.

=== Campus U-1 ===
U-1 is the highest building and one of the largest in the university. The body has a rectangular shape at the base. It has a large area of glazing (*). It is the tallest in the university and one of the tallest buildings in the city — besides, it is located on top of a hill. You can see much of the city from there: all Nagirnyy region and adjacent neighbors, Holodna Gora, Saltovka, Novi doma. This building was commissioned in 1974. There are six elevators, including two high-speed, which start to function 10 minutes before the lectures start and stop when they begin. There are two stairwells. U-1 has many departments, dean offices and classrooms.

- Height: 60 m
- Number of floors: 14
- Year of completion: 1974

=== Campus U-2 ===
U-2 is the second highest and the largest building of the university. As with U-1, it was built during the period of mass construction and in the typical style. Its shape is rectangular; it is linked by an underground passage with the Physical campus building. The architectural design is more interesting than U-1, for example, the staircase is paved with marble. As in U-1, there are four elevators. The building has eight floors including a basement which is used for education. (U-1 has a basement but, unlike U-2, it's for storage.)

The building includes a department of general and experimental physics along with many other departments. The university entrance examination commission, offices of the university newspapers and the cafeteria are housed there. Physical condition of the campus is relatively good. One of the university computer labs local is here. The first floor of the building is occupied by the student government "Student Alliance" of NTU "KhPI"

- Height: 32–34 m
- Number of floors: 7 (8 with the basement)
- Year of completing: 1982

=== Central part of Main Classroom Building ===
MCB (Main Classroom Building) is the largest of the old buildings of the institute. It is lined with brick and was constructed in the second half of the 19th century. The building contains a number of departments, dean offices and other classrooms. The building is rectangular with two interior courtyards. There are a library and reading room. The classic design of the stairs is the main architectural feature of the building. It has three floors, with high ceilings whose height is 4.5 meters. The building has a large basement.

For a long time it was used as the main building of the university (until building of U-1 and U-2). During its long existence (over 100 years) many famous people worked there. There are memorial plaques at the main entrance of the building in their honor. The Memorial built in honor of Polytechnicians, who died during the Great Patriotic War is opposite the building. The building itself has a lot of art work showing the life of the institute in different eras and a wall commemorating the heroes of the Great Patriotic War. The outside part of the building has rich architectural decoration.

- Height: 17 m
- Number of floors: 3
- Year of completing: 1885

=== Sports Complex ===
The Sports complex of the NTU "KhPI" is a building separate from the campus in the Kharkiv Youth's park (close to Pushkinskaya subway station, apart from other university buildings). It is built of cement blocks. It is a relatively new building built in the 1980s. The Sports complex has a lot of rooms, gyms and sport objects including an Olympic-size pool. It is equipped with modern changing rooms and shower facilities. Athletic competitions between NTU "KhPI" students and students of other universities take place here. Also the NTU "KhPI" students' physical education classes are held here. The Sports complex is one of the best buildings in the city and at the university. It is the second large building of university campus after U-2 (2nd Educational building). The building shape is not uniform as it is more geared toward functionality. The lobby is decorated by two trophy-cases containing awards, won by NTU "KhPI" sportsmen.

The university has unique sports facilities, which in certain sports granted the status of the Center of Olympic training. Athletes successfully defend the honor of the university in competitions at the highest level. In total during 2005 to 2011 in the competition of the European level they won 46 gold, 33 silver and 62 bronze awards. In world competitions they won 36 gold, 20 silver and 19 bronze awards.

On 24 June 2022, the Sports complex was destroyed by Russian shelling.

=== Radio-electronic building (modern name: NTU "KhPI" Center for Integrated Technologies) ===
The Radio-electronic building ("NTU KhPI Center for Integrated Technologies") is a four-floor cement building, with a basement. It is one of the new university's buildings. In this rather small building are housed laboratories, equipment and computer classes. The ground floor windows are protected with grates. Including a basement it is a five-storey building. There is a freight elevator. Floors are connected with big panoramic staircases. Among the university buildings, which were built during Soviet years in the 1960s–1970s, this one has the lowest number of floors. The research institute is on the second and third floors. The building also houses the Institute of Ionosphere of NAS, the Ministry of Education and the offices of Youth and Sport of Ukraine.

- Height : 16 m
- Number of stores: 4 (5 with basement)
- Completion of construction: 1960s and '70s

=== Chemistry building is one of the oldest in the university ===
The Chemistry building is the second in size and importance of the old buildings of the university. It was built in the middle of 19th century along with the Main Academic building. Most chemical laboratories and dean's office of the Organic Substances Technology Faculty are located in the building. Like the Main Academic building it is square shaped with an enclosed court in the centre.

On the second floor of the building is the Great Chemical Auditorium, one of the largest in the institute. The building has two entrances: external and internal. The addition of two floors marred the building's classic design.

- Height: 18 m
- Number of floors: 4 (sometimes 3)
- Completion of construction: Second half – the end of 19th century.

=== Electrotechnical building ===
The Electrotechnical building of NTU "KhPI" has the most students. In the past this building was an independent Electrotechnical institute, separated from Kharkiv Technical Institute. It was designed by the architect Beketov in 1930 and is an example of architectural constructivism. Technical departments and dean's offices are located in the building. The Electrotechnical building is one of the largest in the university; it has several entrances and exits as well as the main one.

After the war during the process of reconstruction, the main entrance of the building was designed as a colonnade in the architectural style of Stalin's Empire. The building plays an important role in the life of NTU "KhPI". Different events and funerals for honored people of the university take place in front of the map of electrification and before the statue of Lenin.

== Departments and satellite campus ==
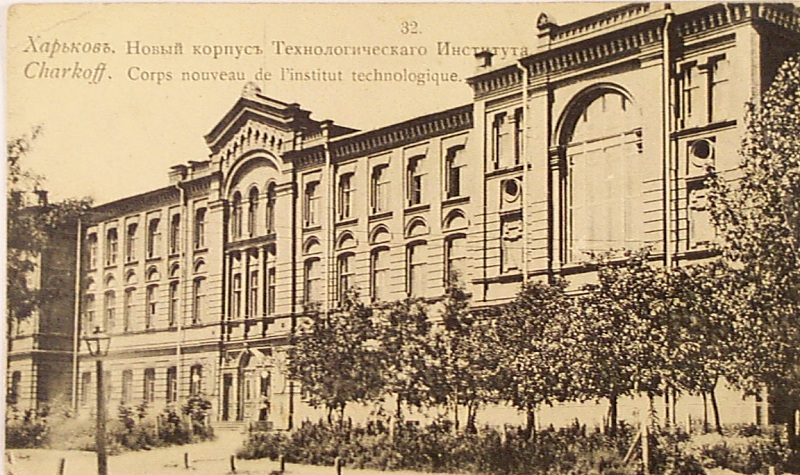
Main Administrative Building, circa 1900

- Department of computer science and management
- Department of computer and information technologies
- Department of mechanical engineering
- Department of power-plant engineering
- Department of transport engineering
- Department of economics
- Department of business and finance
- Department of physics and technology
- Department of electric power
- Department of electric-power engineering
- Department of instrument-making
- Department of inorganic-substance technology
- Department of organic-substance technology
- Department of chemical machine engineering
- Department of economics and law
- Department of business management
- Department of military education (formerly the Kharkiv Higher Tank Command School)
- Chernivtsi campus

== Notable alumni and faculty ==
- Nikolay Beketov, Russian physical chemist
- Lev Belkind, Soviet power engineer and science historian
- Konstantin Chelpan, chief designer of the T-34 tank engine
- Marharyta Dorozhon, Israeli javelin thrower
- Mikhail Gurevich, Soviet aircraft designer
- Leonid Krasin, Russian and Soviet Bolshevik politician and diplomat
- Hnat Khotkevych, Ukrainian cultural figure
- Lev Landau, Soviet physicist, Nobel Prize winner (1962)
- Alexey Oleynik, Ukrainian-Russian professional mixed martial artist, two-time world champion in combat sambo, current UFC Heavyweight
- Leonid Pastur, Ukrainian physicist and mathematician.
- Nikolai Pylchykov, KhPI professor, practical physicist, inventor of radio remote control and photovoltaic effect
- Vladimir Steklov, Soviet/Russian mathematician and physicist
- Leon Theremin, Soviet inventor, creator of the theremin, the first electronic musical instrument
- Sergiy Vilkomir, Ukrainian-born computer scientist
- Iona Yakir, Red Army commander and military reformer

== Honorable doctors ==
The first doctors of honor of NTU "KhPI" were distinguished scientist such as Professors D.I. Mendeleev and N.E. Zhukovsky. Over the past years, famous scientists from 13 countries, along with the scientists of Ukraine, were awarded the title of Honorary Doctor of NTU "KhPI". Among them:

- Academician B.E. Paton
- Academician A.K. Shidlovsky
- Academician V.V. Kafarov (Russia)
- Academician M.Z. Zgurovsky
- Academician V.L. Rvachov
- Academician Ferenc Kovacs (Hungary)
- Academician V.P. Seminozhenko
- Academician P.D. Sarkisov (Russia)
- Academician G.A. Yagodin (Russia)
- Academician B.S. Stogniy;
- prof. Nicholas Iliash (Romania)
- prof. Michelle Fyuten (France)
- prof. Wolfgang Kersten (Germany)
- prof. Dieter Schneider (Austria)
- prof. Tilman Reuter (Austria)
- prof. Johannes Altenbach (Germany)

== Facilities ==
The university is unique among other Kharkiv educational institutions, as it occupies the same campus that was initially given to it at its foundation in 1885 (the area was formerly called "Technological Garden", after the former name of the university).

Several campus buildings remain intact from the 19th century and may be considered historically significant as samples of past campus architecture:

- Main Administrative building
- Main Academic building
- Chemistry building
- Physics building
- Technical building
- Mathematical building
- Engineering building

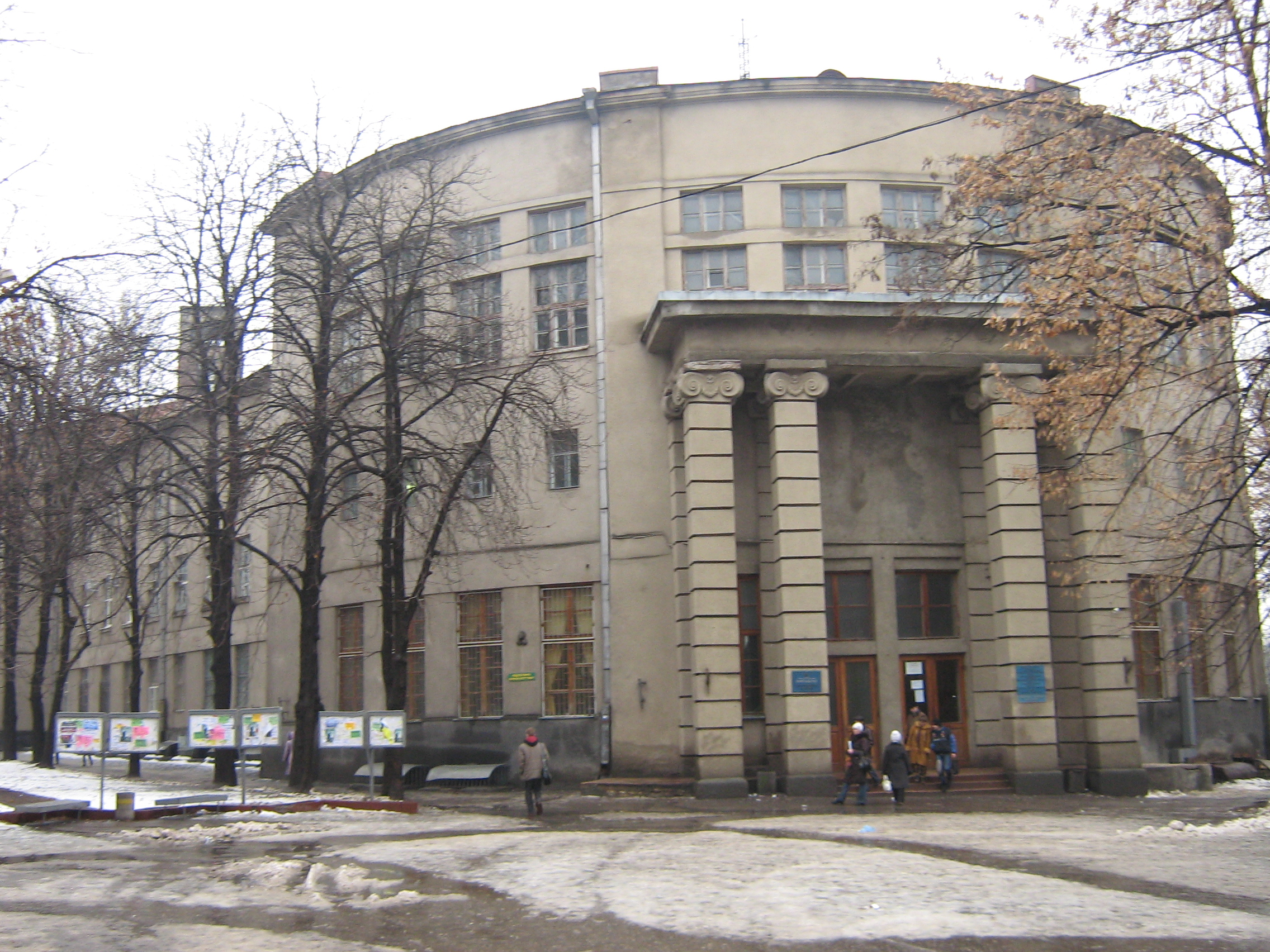
Electrotechnical Building

In addition, these modern facilities were established during the Soviet era:

- Electrotechnical building (1929–30)
- Administrative and economic building
- 1st Educational (U-1) building (1977)
- 2nd Educational (U-2) building (1985)
- Computer building (former graduate-education building)
- Radio-electronic building
- Gigant (Giant) student dormitory (1926–30), located off-campus

== Sports ==
The institute has a contemporary sports complex, allowing for more than 30 types of sports and activities; this allows for active involvement in sports for students and faculty. Among thousands of active sportsmen in NTU "KhPI" are Olympic and world champions, winners of international and national competitions, including Т. Artemenko, I. Moskaltsov, V. Homutov (mountaineering), Aleksei Barkalov (water polo, two gold Olympic medals in 1972 and 1980), G. Gafanovich (volleyball), Dmitrii Bezkorovaynyi, Ruslan Babaev (arm wrestling), I. Kaydash, L. Tkachenko-Garkavaya (track and field), N. Yesipenko (badminton), I. Kyrychenko (cycling), L. Khazieva (swimming), I. Raevskyy and D. Slatyn (basketball).

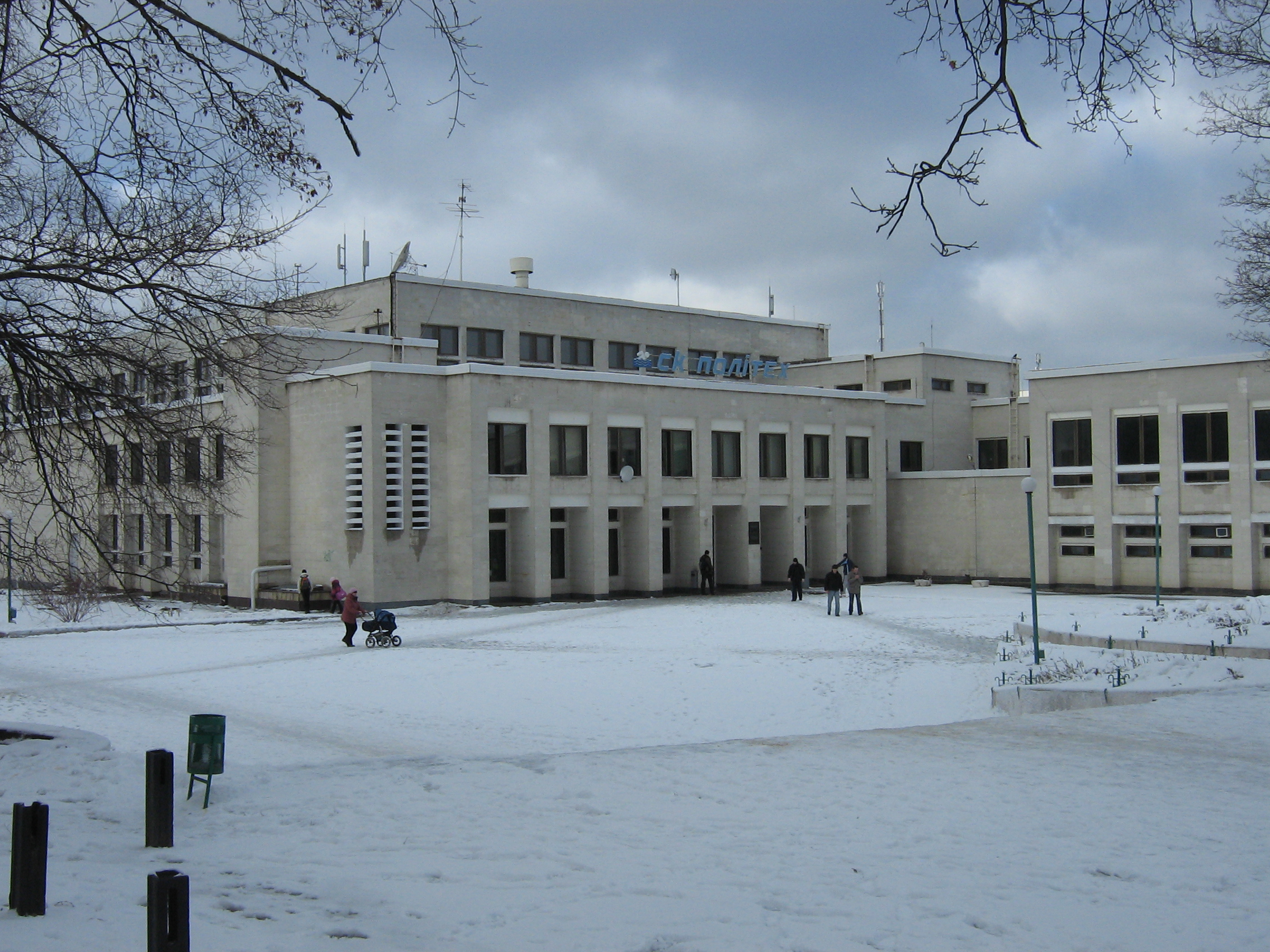
Sports Building

2004 Summer Olympics participants from NTU "KhPI":

- Oleksandr Serdyuk – bronze medal (men's archery team competition)
- Oleksandra Ryzhkova (women's track and field)
- Andriy Tverdostup (men's track and field)
- Iana Dementeva (women's rowing)

2008 Summer Olympics participants from NTU "KhPI":

- Ihor Bodrov – men's track and field

Since 1997, Dmitriy Bezkorovaynyi and Ruslan Babaev have won several world arm-wrestling championships. Considerable success on the 2004 Summer Paralympics in Athens was achieved by Andriy Zhyltsov (gold, silver and two bronze medals) in athletics (track-and-field) events.

== Awards and reputation ==
In the 2012 rankings of the most famous universities in Ukraine the National Technical University "Kharkiv Polytechnic Institute" was in the top ten.

University rankings

Global – Overall
- THE World: 1001+

2012 Ranking of NTU "KhPI":

- Composite "Compass" ranking – 6th place
- "Dengi" magazine – 3rd place
- "Engineering and Technical specialties" ranking – 3rd place
- "Compass 2012" IT specialty – 3rd place
- "Compass 2012" Eastern Region – 1st place
- UNESCO "Top 200" – 6th place
- Webometrics Ranking of World Universities:
  - in the world – 2092
  - in Europe – 798.

2013 Ranking of NTU "KhPI":

- QS World University Rankings – 701+
- Webometrics Ranking of World Universities:
  - in the world – 2743
  - in Europe – 741.

== Literature ==
Національний технічний університет «Харківський політехнічний інститут». Історія розвитку. 1885-2010 / уклад.: В.І. Ніколаєнко, В. В. Кабачек, С. І. Мєшковая [та інш.]; за ред. В. І. Ніколаєнка. – Харків : НТУ «ХПІ». 2010. - 408 с.

== See also ==
List of universities in Ukraine
