= Kharkiv model V-2 =

V-2
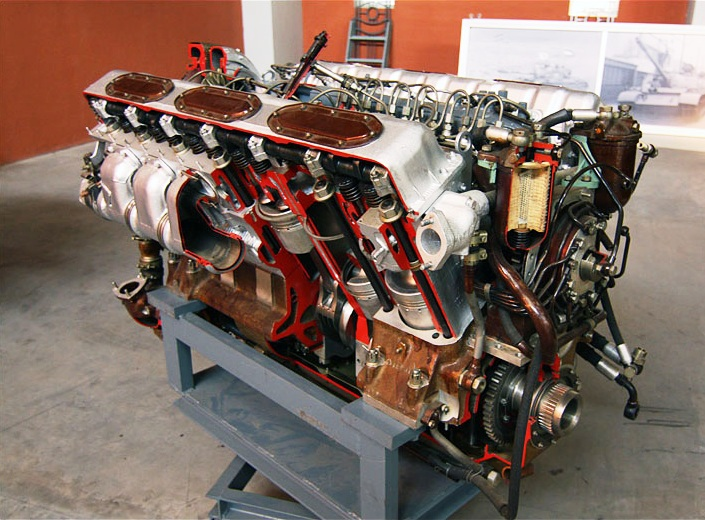
- The V-92 is the latest derivative of the V-2 family of engines, used on several Russian tanks and other military vehicles.

Overview
- Manufacturer: Kharkov Locomotive Factory
- Designer: Konstantin Chelpan
- Production: V-2: 1939 - late 1940s; V-11: 1939 - late 1940s; V-12: 1945 - late 1940s; V-54: 1947 - late 1960s; V-55: 1958 - early 1980s; V-46: 1973-present; V-84: 1978-present; V-92: 1992-present

Layout
- Configuration: V-12
- Displacement: 38.8 L (2,370 cu in)
- Cylinder bore: 150 mm (5.9 in)
- Piston stroke: 180 mm (7.1 in) left group; 186 mm (7.3 in) right group
- Compression ratio: 15:1 right cyl. bank; 15.8:1 left cyl. bank (from flywheel end)

Combustion
- Fuel type: Diesel

Output
- Power output: 460–700 hp (340–520 kW)
- Torque output: 220 kgf⋅m (2,157 N⋅m; 1,591 lbf⋅ft)

Dimensions
- Dry weight: 2,210 lb (1,000 kg)

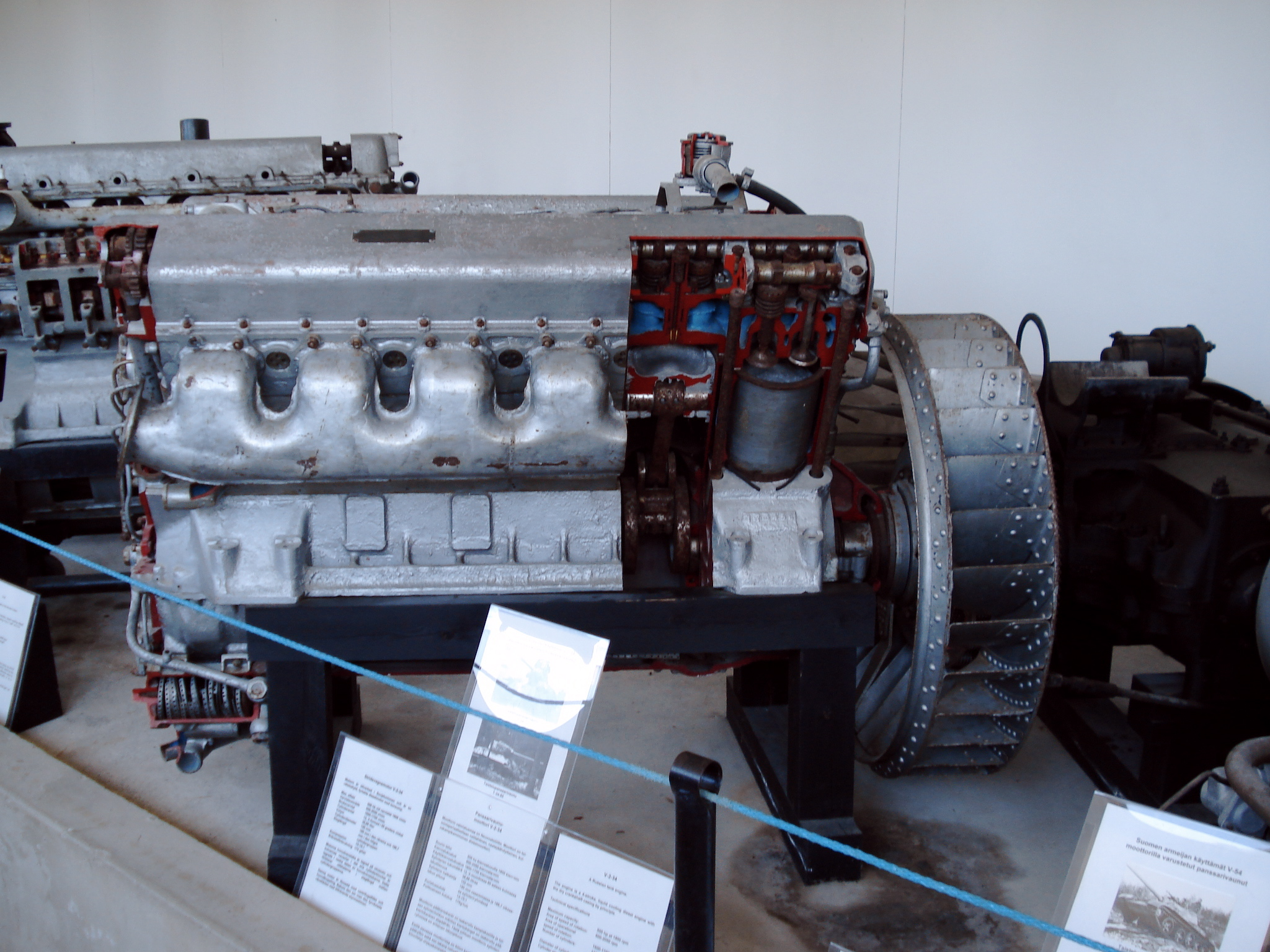
Another view of the engine

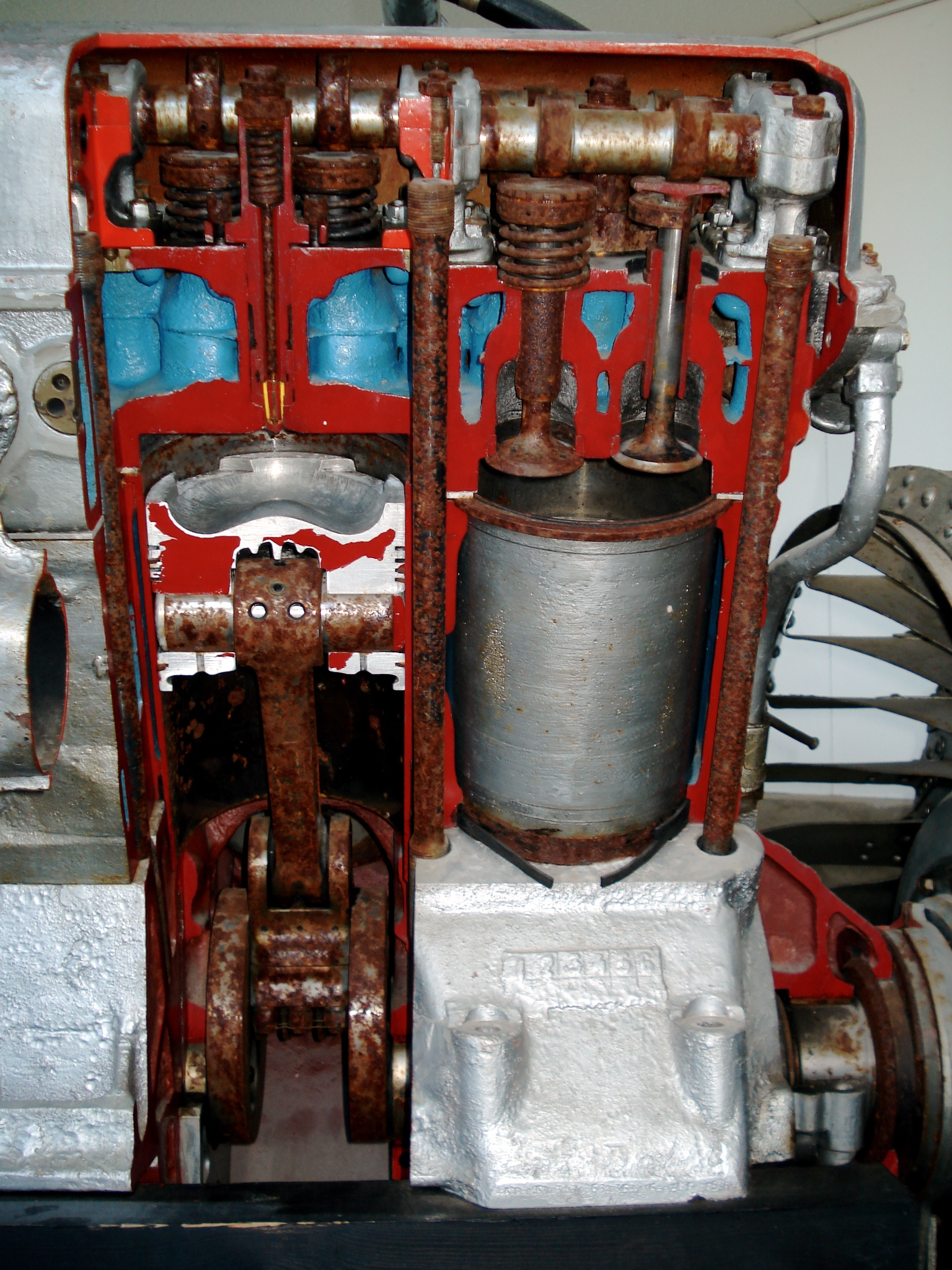
Close up view on cylinder

The Kharkiv model V-2 (Russian: В-2) is a Soviet and Russian family of diesel tank V-12 engines, the V angle at 60°, with dual overhead camshafts per bank, four valves per cylinder opened by bucket-style followers and direct fuel injection. Designed at the Kharkiv Locomotive Factory by Konstantin Chelpan and his team, it is found in the BT-7M (BT-8), T-34, KV, IS and IS-10 (T-10) tanks, and by extension, the vehicles based on them, such as the SU-85 and SU-100 tank destroyers based on the T-34 and the ISU-122 and ISU-152 self-propelled guns based on the IS-2. Throughout its production life, output ranged from roughly 450–700 hp (340–520 kW).

Successive variants of the V-2 have been used in multiple Soviet and Russian vehicles ever since. Derivatives of the V-2 remain in production, with the T-90A tank, Koalitsiya-SV self-propelled gun and BMPT Terminator armoured support vehicle equipped with a 1,000-hp V92S2, while the latest T-72B3 and T-90M tanks feature an upgraded 1,130-hp V-92S2F. Licensed production additionally continues in several countries.

== History of development and production ==
The V-2 was in development from 1931 until 1939 by the design team of the diesel department of the Kharkiv Locomotive Works, first under the leadership of Konstantin Chelpan, a prominent Soviet engineer of Greek background, who was arrested and executed in 1938, during the infamous Greek Operation of NKVD. Work was passed down to his deputy for project work, Yakov Efimovich Vikhman, and Ivan Yakovlevich Trashutin, his deputy for experimental and production work, who completed development of the engine in 1939.

Serial production for the V-2 begun on September 1, 1939. The Red Army adopted the V-2 engine in the same year in three modifications: the V-2 (500 hp; 370 kW), the V-2K (600 hp; 450 kW) for the KV line of tanks and the V-2V (375 hp; 280 kW).

Near the end of the 20th century, the V-2 was fitted with more modern modifications by the chief designer of the head design bureau for the Chelyabinsk Tractor Plant, Vladimir Ivanovich Butov.

== Description ==
The engine was made of aluminium with a closed water-cooling system. It included a water jacket of the cylinder blocks, radiators, a water pump, a centrifugal fan, a T-valve with steam and air valves, and piping. The cooling system capacity was 90–95 liters. The radiators were connected to the surrounding air via an air valve. The T-valve, leading to both radiators, was designed for filling the cooling system with coolant.

== Variants ==
- V-2: Initial production version, 1937. Used in the BT-7M (BT-8).
- V-2-34: V-2 with revised hull mounts, fuel and cooling connectors and refined clutch, 1939. Used in the T-34, SU-85 and SU-100, it produced 500 hp (370 kW) @ 1,800 rpm. The following units were attached to the engine: fuel feed pump; fuel filter; fuel pump NK-1; high-pressure fuel line; oil pump; oil filter; water pump, and alternator. The starting of the engine could be carried out using the electric starter ST-700 (the main method), or compressed air (the alternate method) using the two air cylinders located in the driver’s compartment.
- V-2K: V-2 with increased injection pressure and higher engine speed, 1939. Used in the KV-1 and KV-2, it produced 600 hp (450 kW) at 2,000 rpm.
- V-2V: V-2 detuned for use in lighter vehicles, 1940. Used in the Voroshilovets artillery tractor, it produced 375 hp (280 kW).
- V-2L/P: V-2 modified for boats, not built.
- V-2SN (Нагнетатель системы, supercharger systems): V-2 with a supercharger from the AM-38 aircraft engine, 1940. Used in the KV-3, it produced 862 hp (643 kW).
- V-2-10 (V-2IS): V-2 with stronger cylinders and heads, improved fuel pump, larger radiator and oil cooler and modified hull mounts, 1943. Used in the IS-1, IS-2, ISU-122 and ISU-152, it produced 520 hp (390 kW).
- V-2-450AV-S3: V-2 modified for oil drilling equipment, it produced 450 hp (340 kW).
- V-4: Essentially a V-2 engine cut in half to form an inline six engine. Used in the T-50. It produced 300 hp (220 kW).
- V-5: V-2K with increased injection pressure and higher engine speed, 1940. Used in the prototype T-150 and T-220. It produced 700 hp (520 kW).
- V-6: Essentially a V-2 engine cut in half to form an inline six engine. Used in the PT-76. It produced 240 hp (180 kW).
- V-6V: Used in the BTR-50P. It produced 240 hp (180 kW).
- V-6R: Used in the ZSU-23-4. It produced 280 hp (210 kW).
- V-11-IS-3: Used in the IS-3; It produced 520 hp (390 kW). Developed into the V-44, used in the T-44.
- V-12: Used in the IS-4. Fitted with a supercharger from the AM-38F aircraft engine. It produced 750 hp (560 kW). Produced in small numbers due to its extreme unreliability.
- V-12-5: Used in the T-10. Fitted with a supercharger from the AM-42 aircraft engine. It produced 700 hp (520 kW).
- V-12-6: Used in the Object 268 and the T-10M. It produced 750 hp (560 kW).
- V-44 (V-2-44): Used in the T-44, it produced 520 hp (390 kW).
- V-54 (V-2-54): Used in the T-54, it produced 520 hp (390 kW).
- V-54K-IS (V-2-54IS): Structurally adapted to fit the engine compartments of older heavy tanks. Used in the IS-2M, IS-3M and the ISU-152M/K. It produced 520 hp (390 kW).
- V-55: Used in the T-55, it produced 580 hp (430 kW).
- V-55V: Used in the T-55A and the T-62, it produced 580 hp (430 kW).
- V-55U: Used in the T-55M/AM and the T-62M, it produced 620 hp (460 kW).
- V-46-1: Used in the 2S7 Pion. It produced 780 hp (580 kW).
- V-46-2S1: Used in the 2S6/2S6M. It produced 710 hp (530 kW).
- V-46-4: Used in the T-72 and the T-72M. It produced 780 hp (580 kW).
- V-46-5M: Used in the T-55M-1/AM-1 and the T-62M-1. It produced 690 hp (510 kW).
- V-46-6: Used in the T-72A and the T-72M1. It produced 780 hp (580 kW).
- V-59: Heavily detuned version of the V-46, used in the 2S3, 2S4 and the 2S5. It produced 520 hp (390 kW).
- V-84-1: Used in the T-72B. It produced 840 hp (630 kW).
- V-84MS: Used in the T-90 and the T-90S. It produced 840 hp (630 kW).
- V-84A: Used in the 2S19. It produced 780 hp (580 kW).
- V-84AMS: Used in the 2S19M2. It produced 840 hp (630 kW).
- V-84B: Used in the 2S7M Malka. It produced 840 hp (630 kW).
- V-84DT: Used in the 2S6M1. It produced 840 hp (630 kW).
- V-92S2: Used in the T-90A, 2S35 Koalitsiya-SV and the BMPT Terminator. It produced 1,000 hp (750 kW)
- V-92S2F: Used in the T-72B3 and the T-90M. It produced 1,130 hp (840 kW)
- V-401: Detuned version of the V-54 for the AT-T artillery tractor, it produced 415 hp (309 kW).
- DV-12A: Produced in China at Shanxi Diesel Motor Factory. Used in Dongfeng DMU (NM1) power cars. Power output was 300 hp (220 kW).

== Manufacturers ==
The V-2 equipped T-34 was the most-produced tank of the Second World War, as well as the second most-produced tank of all time (after the T-54/T-55, equipped with the upgraded V-54 and V-55).

Before the 2nd World War, it was produced only at Engine Plant No. 75 (a branch of the Kharkov Locomotive Plant), the contractors were KhTZ, Chelyabinsk and Kirov (Leningrad) plants.

After the start of the war, it was produced at the Stalingrad Tractor Plant and in Sverdlovsk at Plant No. 76. In October 1941, Plant No. 75 was evacuated to Chelyabinsk to the ChTZ site. The Kirov plant also moved there. All of them were united into a huge Tankograd. This plant became the main manufacturer of the V-2 during the war (about 50 thousand engines, including engines produced in Kharkov). Later, in 1942, production of the V-2 was also mastered at plant No. 77 in Barnaul.

As of 2022, production of derivatives of the V-2 engine continues at the Chelyabinsk Tractor Plant, Barnaultransmash and the Ural Diesel Engine Plant.

== Gallery ==
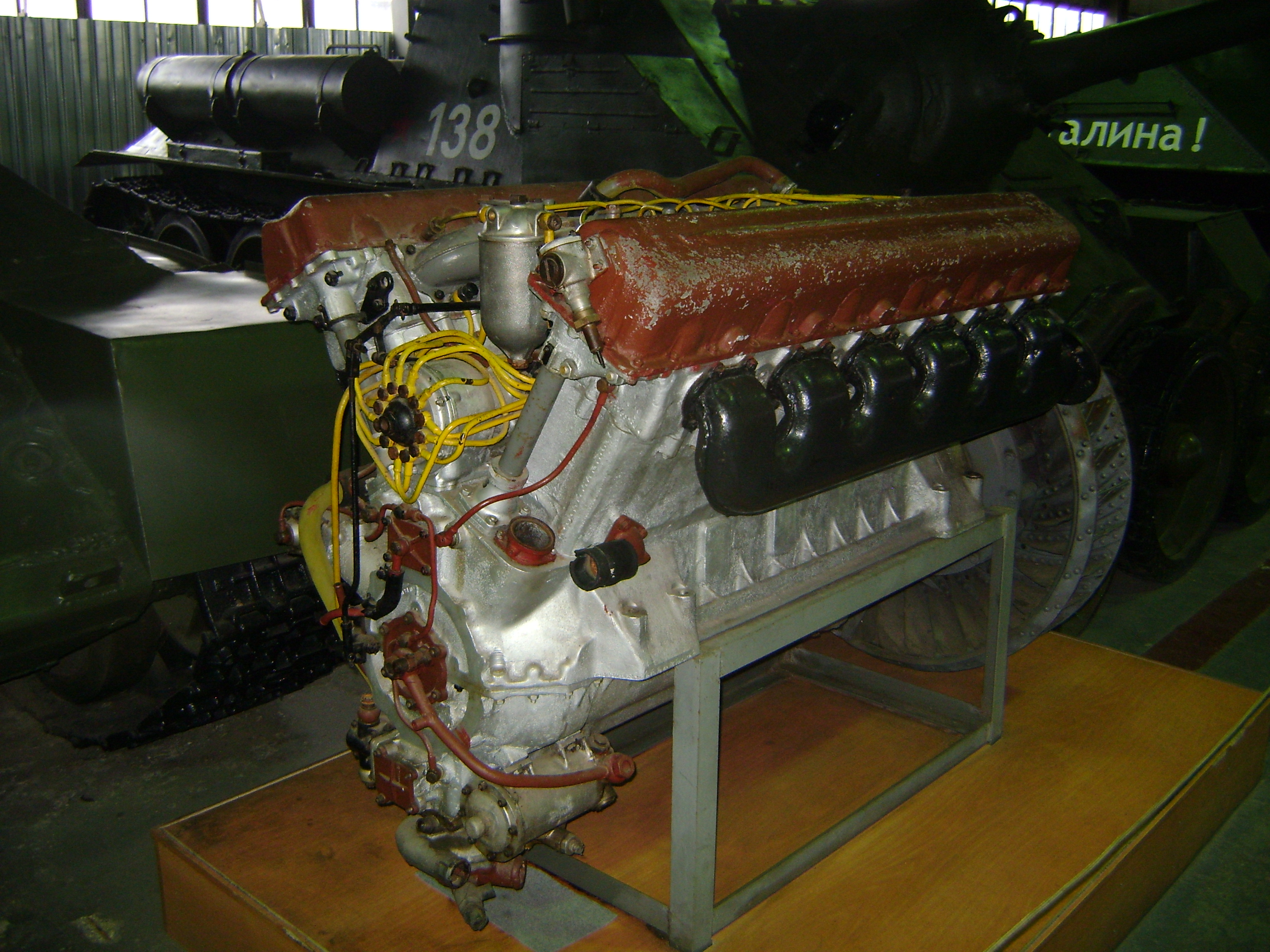
V-2

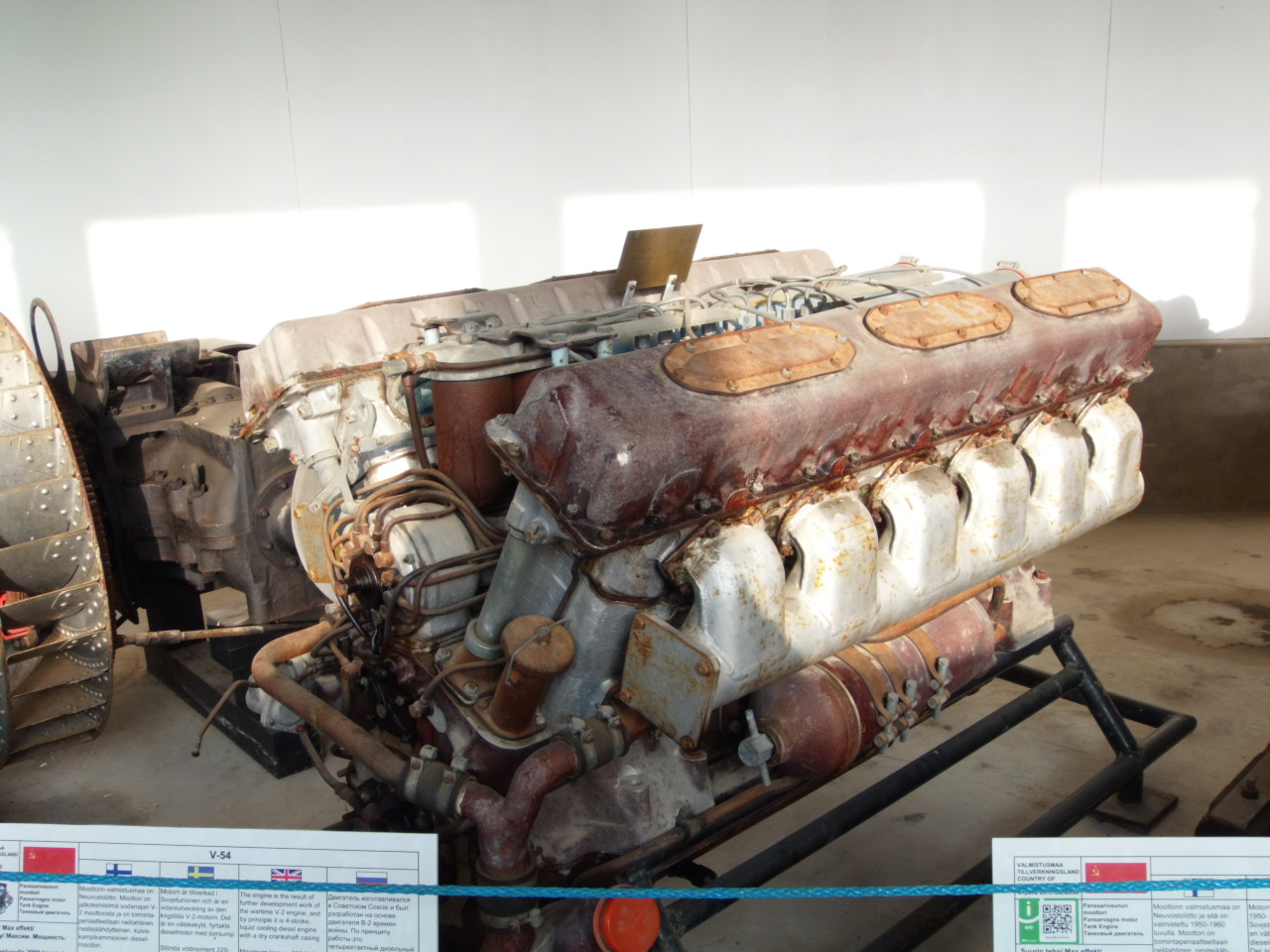
V-54

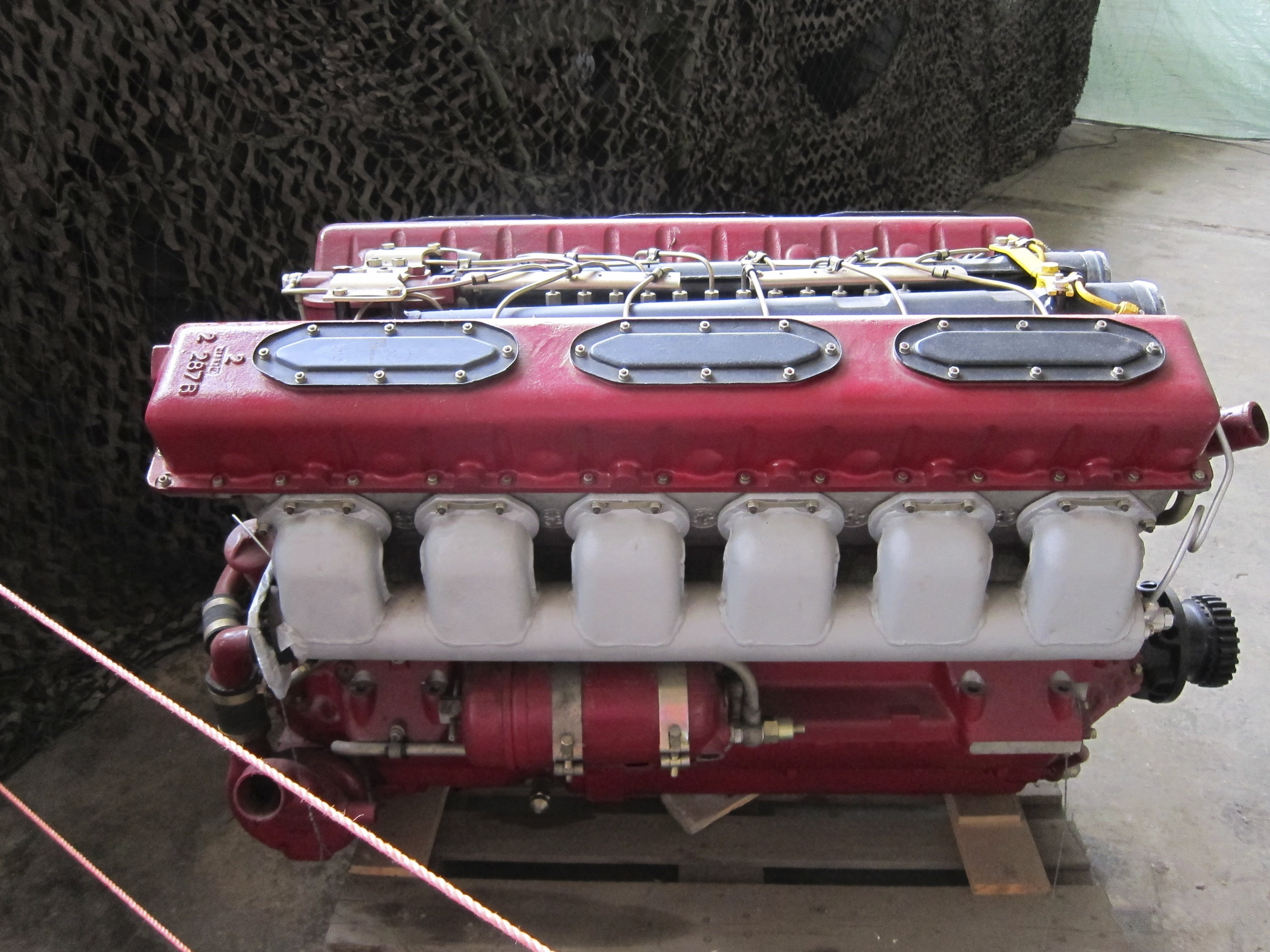
V-55

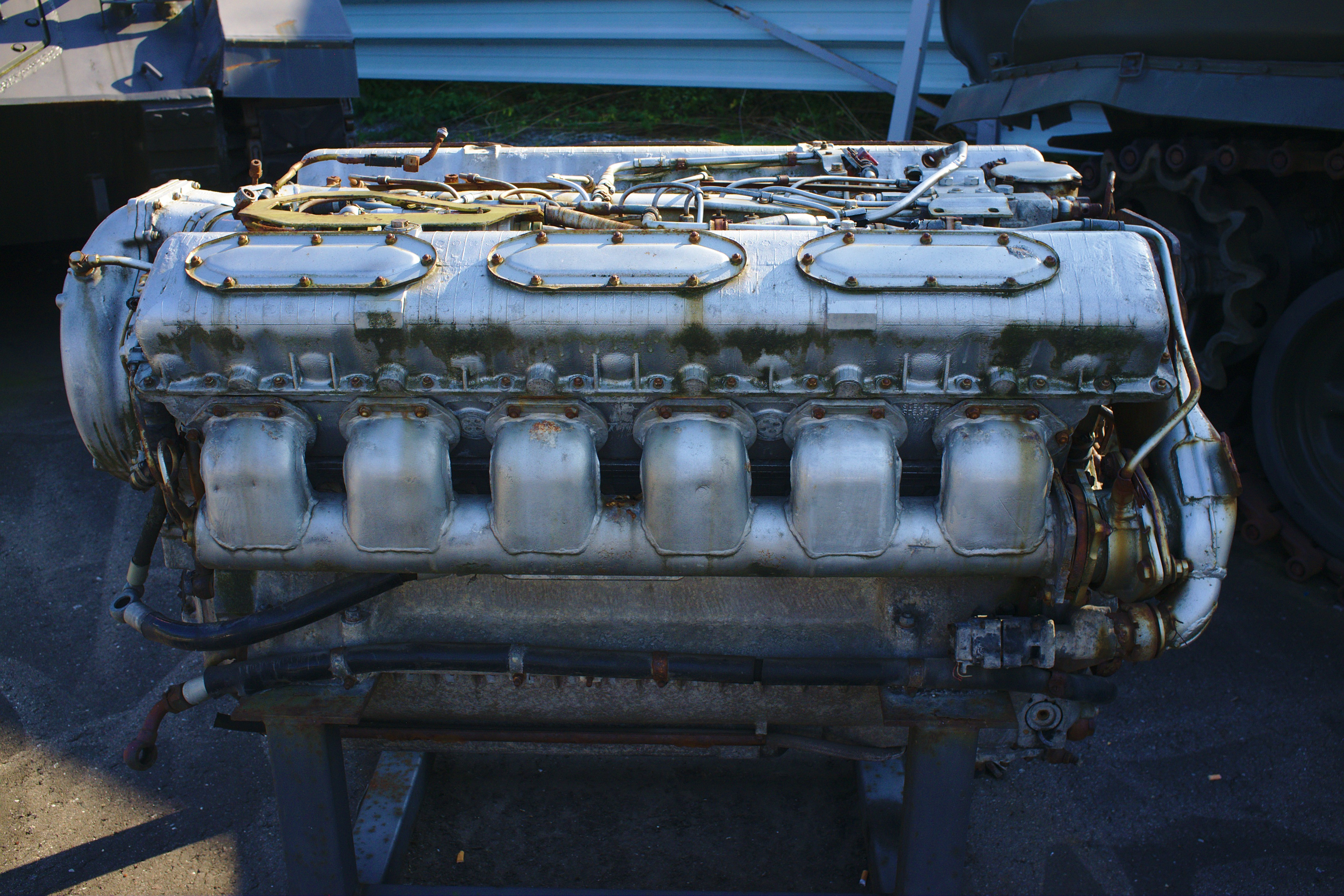
V-46

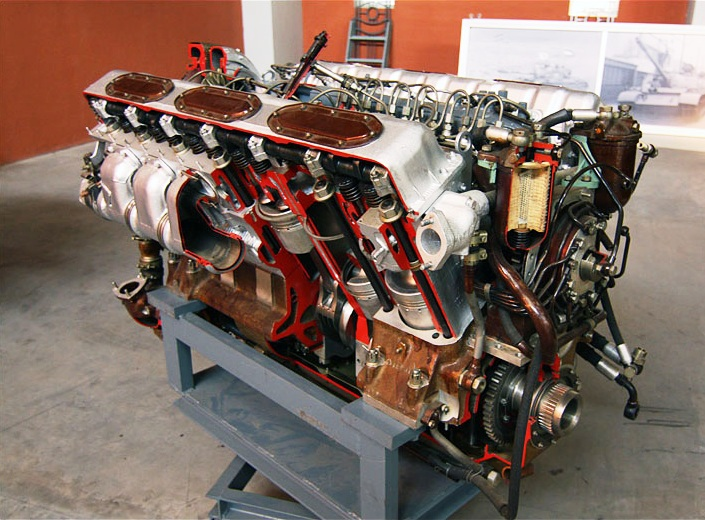
V-92

== See also ==
- Maybach HL230, equivalent contemporary German tank engine
- Rolls-Royce Meteor, equivalent contemporary British tank engine
- Ford GAA engine, equivalent contemporary US tank engine
- Wright R-975 Whirlwind, another contemporary US tank engine
