= 2014 Korea Open Super Series =

Tournament details
- Dates: January 7, 2014 - January 12, 2014
- Edition: 24th
- Level: Super Series
- Total prize money: US$600,000
- Location: Seoul, South Korea

Champions
- Men's singles: (China) Chen Long
- Women's singles: (China) Wang Yihan
- Men's doubles: (Denmark) Mathias Boe (Denmark) Carsten Mogensen
- Women's doubles: (China) Bao Yixin (China) Tang Jinhua
- Mixed doubles: (China) Zhang Nan (China) Zhao Yunlei

The 2014 Korea Open Super Series was the first super series tournament of the 2014 BWF Super Series. The tournament took place in Seoul, South Korea from January 7–12, 2014 and had a total purse of $600,000. A qualification was held to fill four places in four of the five disciplines of the main draws.

== Men's singles ==
=== Seeds ===
1. (Malaysia) Lee Chong Wei
2. (China) Chen Long
3. (Indonesia) Tommy Sugiarto
4. (Denmark) Jan Ø. Jørgensen
5. (Japan) Kenichi Tago
6. (Thailand) Boonsak Ponsana
7. (China) Du Pengyu
8. (Vietnam) Nguyen Tien Minh

=== Top half ===
First Round
1	(Malaysia) Lee C W	21	21
(South Korea) Shon W-h	11	18
(Denmark) V Axelsen	19	16
(Germany) M Zwiebler	21	21
7	(China) Du PY	21	21
(Japan) S Sasaki	10	8
Q4	(South Korea) Lee D-k	18	21	20
(Japan) K Momota	21	16	22
4	(Denmark) J Ø Jørgensen	21	21
(Netherlands) E Pang	19	15
(Japan) K Sakai	21	21
Q3	(South Korea) Jeon H-j	13	10
5	(Japan) K Tago	21	21
(India) K. Srikanth	10	11
(Malaysia) Chong W F	18	11
(Russia) V Ivanov	21	21

Second Round
1	(Malaysia) Lee C W	21	21
(Germany) M Zwiebler	14	18
7	(China) Du PY	21	21
(Japan) K Momota	10	15
4	(Denmark) J Ø Jørgensen	21	21
(Japan) K Sakai	19	18
5	(Japan) K Tago	21	21
(Russia) V Ivanov	19	12

Quarterfinals
1	(Malaysia) Lee C W	21	21
7	(China) Du PY	9	12
4	(Denmark) J Ø Jørgensen	11	14
5	(Japan) K Tago	21	21

Semifinals
1	(Malaysia) Lee C W	21	21
5	(Japan) K Tago	17	17

=== Bottom half ===
First Round
(Indonesia) D H Rumbaka	13	21	21
(Thailand) T Saensomboonsuk	21	16	14
(Hong Kong) Wong W K	13	0^{r}
6	(Thailand) B Ponsana	21	5
(Denmark) H-K Vittinghus	13	16
PFQ	(China) Gao H	21	21
(China) Tian HW	21	21
3	(Indonesia) T Sugiarto	12	17
Q2	(South Korea) Hwang J-s	13	21	21
(England) R Ouseph	21	17	16
(Hong Kong) Hu Y	22	4^{r}
8	(Vietnam) Nguyen T M	21	11
(India) R.M.V. Gurusai D	11	11
(Japan) T Ueda	21	21
Q1	(Indonesia) S Santoso	11	12
2	(China) Chen L	21	21

Second Round
(Indonesia) D H Rumbaka	13	15
6	(Thailand) B Ponsana	21	21
PFQ	(China) Gao H	21	21
(China) Tian HW	17	11
Q2	(South Korea) Hwang J-s	21	18	9
8	(Vietnam) Nguyen T M	19	21	21
(Japan) T Ueda	21	9	14
2	(China) Chen L	19	21	21

Quarterfinals
6	(Thailand) B Ponsana	21	19	21
PFQ	(China) Gao H	19	21	11
8	(Vietnam) Nguyen T M	17	20
2	(China) Chen L	21	22

Semifinals
6	(Thailand) B Ponsana	15	9
2	(China) Chen L	21	21

=== Finals ===
Semifinals
1	(Malaysia) Lee Chong Wei	21	21
5	(Japan) Kenichi Tago	17	17
6	(Thailand) Boonsak Ponsana	15	9
2	(China) Chen Long	21	21

Final
1	(Malaysia) Lee Chong Wei	14	15
2	(China) Chen Long	21	21

== Women's singles ==
=== Seeds ===
1. (China) Wang Shixian
2. (Thailand) Ratchanok Intanon
3. (China) Wang Yihan
4. (South Korea) Sung Ji-hyun
5. (South Korea) Bae Yeon-ju
6. (Chinese Taipei) Tai Tzu-ying
7. (Thailand) Porntip Buranaprasertsuk
8. (Japan) Minatsu Mitani

=== Top half ===
First Round
1	(China) Wang SX	21	21
(France) S Vignes Waran	11	11
Q3	(South Korea) Lee J-m	23	21
(Spain) B Corrales	21	12
6	(Chinese Taipei) Tai T-y	16	21	21
(Hong Kong) Yip P Y	21	10	18
Q2	(South Korea) Yoon M-a	10	15
(Thailand) N Jindapon	21	21
3	(China) Wang YH	21	21
(Thailand) B Ongbumrungpan	19	18
Q1	(South Korea) Ko E-b	21	21
(Malaysia) Tee J Y	10	13
5	(South Korea) Bae Y-j	21	21
(Japan) K Imabeppu	9	16
(Indonesia) H Desi	17	11
(China) Yao X	21	21

Second Round
1	(China) Wang SX	21	21
Q3	(South Korea) Lee J-m	11	11
6	(Chinese Taipei) Tai T-y	21	21
(Thailand) N Jindapon	17	17
3	(China) Wang YH	21	21
Q1	(South Korea) Ko E-b	4	9
5	(South Korea) Bae Y-j	22	21
(China) Yao X	20	14

Quarterfinals
1	(China) Wang SX	12	21	24
6	(Chinese Taipei) Tai T-y	21	12	22
3	(China) Wang YH	21	18	21
5	(South Korea) Bae Y-j	12	21	17

Semifinals
1	(China) Wang SX	19	12
3	(China) Wang YH	21	21

=== Bottom half ===
First Round
(Japan) E Hirose	21	21
(Russia) N Perminova	18	6
(Hong Kong) Chan T K	8	6
8	(Japan) M Mitani	21	21
(Japan) S Takahashi	21	21
(Indonesia) A Yuswandari	12	11
(Thailand) P Chochuwong	11	13
4	(South Korea) Sung J-h	21	21
(Japan) Y Hashimoto	7	21	16
(China) Han L	21	17	21
Q4	(Japan) A Yamaguchi	11
7	(Thailand) P Buranaprasertsuk	1^{r}
(South Korea) Kim H-m	13	15
(Spain) C Marín	21	21
(China) Suo D	16	18
2	(Thailand) R Intanon	21	21

Second Round
(Japan) E Hirose	21	17
8	(Japan) M Mitani	23	21
(Japan) S Takahashi	11	13
4	(South Korea) Sung J-h	21	21
(China) Han L	21	19	23
Q4	(Japan) A Yamaguchi	17	21	21
(Spain) C Marín	16	21	15
2	(Thailand) R Intanon	21	13	21

Quarterfinals
8	(Japan) M Mitani	15	21
4	(South Korea) Sung J-h	21	23
(China) Han L	18	18
2	(Thailand) R Intanon	21	21

Semifinals
4	(South Korea) Sung J-h	22	21	17
2	(Thailand) R Intanon	24	11	21

=== Finals ===
Semifinals
1	(China) Wang Shixian	19	12
3	(China) Wang Yihan	21	21
4	(South Korea) Sung Ji-hyun	22	21	17
2	(Thailand) Ratchanok Intanon	24	11	21

Final
3	(China) Wang Yihan	21	21
2	(Thailand) Ratchanok Intanon	13	19

== Men's doubles ==
=== Seeds ===
1. (Denmark) Mathias Boe / Carsten Mogensen
2. (South Korea) Kim Ki-jung / Kim Sa-rang
3. (China) Liu Xiaolong / Qiu Zihan
4. (Japan) Hiroyuki Endo / Kenichi Hayakawa
5. (South Korea) Lee Yong-dae / Yoo Yeon-seong
6. (Malaysia) Koo Kien Keat / Tan Boon Heong
7. (Malaysia) Hoon Thien How / Tan Wee Kiong
8. (Chinese Taipei) Lee Sheng-mu / Tsai Chia-hsin

=== Top half ===
First Round
1	(Denmark) M Boe (Denmark) C Mogensen	21	21
(Netherlands) R Bosch (Netherlands) K Ridder	11	14
(Thailand) M Jongjit (Thailand) N Puangpuapech	9	21	15
(Japan) H Hashimoto (Japan) N Hirata	21	10	21
8	(Chinese Taipei) Lee S-m (Chinese Taipei) Tsai C-h	21	21
(Germany) M Fuchs (Germany) J Schöttler	13	15
(Malaysia) Goh V S (Malaysia) Lim K W	14	21	21
(England) C Langridge (England) P Mills	21	17	`8
4	(Japan) H Endo (Japan) K Hayakawa	24	21
(Denmark) A Skårup Rasmussen (Denmark) K Astrup Sorensen	22	12
(Russia) E Dremin (Russia) S Lunev	18	17
(Indonesia) W Nayaka (Indonesia) A Yusuf	21	21
5	(South Korea) Lee Y-d (South Korea) Yoo Y-s	21	21
(Hong Kong) Chan Y L (Hong Kong) Lee C H	9	9
Q3	(South Korea) Kim J-h (South Korea) Kim J-h	12	18
(South Korea) Lee S-j (South Korea) Shin B-c	21	21

Second Round
1	(Denmark) M Boe (Denmark) C Mogensen	21	17	21
(Japan) H Hashimoto (Japan) N Hirata	12	21	15
8	(Chinese Taipei) Lee S-m (Chinese Taipei) Tsai C-h	13	16
(Malaysia) Goh V S (Malaysia) Lim K W	21	21
4	(Japan) H Endo (Japan) K Hayakawa	21	21
(Indonesia) W Nayaka (Indonesia) A Yusuf	15	13
5	(South Korea) Lee Y-d (South Korea) Yoo Y-s	21	21
(South Korea) Lee S-j (South Korea) Shin B-c	17	12

Quarterfinals
1	(Denmark) M Boe (Denmark) C Mogensen	21	21
(Malaysia) Goh V S (Malaysia) Lim K W	10	9
4	(Japan) H Endo (Japan) K Hayakawa	16	23	21
5	(South Korea) Lee Y-d (South Korea) Yoo Y-s	21	21	15

Semifinals
1	(Denmark) M Boe (Denmark) C Mogensen	22	22
4	(Japan) H Endo (Japan) K Hayakawa	20	20

=== Bottom half ===
First Round
(England) C Adcock (England) A Ellis	21	21
Q2	(South Korea) Choi J-w (South Korea) Seo S-j	17	16
Q1	(South Korea) Bae K-y (South Korea) Jung J-w	10	18
PFQ	(South Korea) Choi S-k (South Korea) Kang J-w	21	21
(Indonesia) B Angriawan (Indonesia) R K Suwardi	21	21
Q4	(Indonesia) A Y Chandra (Japan) S Ikeda	8	18
(Denmark) M Conrad-Petersen (Denmark) M Pieler Kolding	12	18
3	(China) Liu XL (China) Qiu ZH	21	21
(China) Fu HF (China) Hong W	21	21
(Russia) V Ivanov (Russia) I Sozonov	16	17
(China) Kang J (China) Liu C	21	21
7	(Malaysia) Hoon T H (Malaysia) Tan W K	9	13
(Malaysia) Gan T C (Malaysia) Ong S H	7	9
(Japan) H Saeki (Japan) R Taohata	21	21
(Japan) T Kamura (Japan) K Sonoda	21	21
2	(South Korea) Kim K-j (South Korea) Kim S-r	17	19

Second Round
(England) C Adcock (England) A Ellis	21	15	21
PFQ	(South Korea) Choi S-k (South Korea) Kang J-w	16	21	18
(Indonesia) B Angriawan (Indonesia) R K Suwardi	23	16	18
3	(China) Liu XL (China) Qiu ZH	21	21	21
(China) Fu HF (China) Hong W	22	21
(China) Kang J (China) Liu C	20	14
(Japan) H Saeki (Japan) R Taohata	14	15
(Japan) T Kamura (Japan) K Sonoda	21	22

Quarterfinals
(England) C Adcock (England) A Ellis	21	21
3	(China) Liu XL (China) Qiu ZH	19	20
(China) Fu HF (China) Hong W	21	21
(Japan) T Kamura (Japan) K Sonoda	19	19

Semifinals
(England) C Adcock (England) A Ellis	11	9
(China) Fu HF (China) Hong W	21	21

=== Finals ===
Semifinals
1	(Denmark) Mathias Boe (Denmark) Carsten Mogensen	22	22
4	(Japan) Hiroyuki Endo (Japan) Kenichi Hayakawa	20	20
(England) Chris Adcock (England) Andrew Ellis	11	9
(China) Fu Haifeng (China) Hong Wei	21	21

Final
1	(Denmark) Mathias Boe (Denmark) Carsten Mogensen	21	21
(China) Fu Haifeng (China) Hong Wei	12	17

== Women's doubles ==
=== Seeds ===
1. (China) Wang Xiaoli / Yu Yang
2. (Japan) Misaki Matsutomo / Ayaka Takahashi
3. (South Korea) Jang Ye-na / Kim So-young
4. (Thailand) Duanganong Aroonkesorn / Kunchala Voravichitchaikul
5. (China) Bao Yixin / Tang Jinhua
6. (Japan) Reika Kakiiwa / Miyuki Maeda
7. (China) Ma Jin / Tang Yuanting
8. (South Korea) Go Ah-ra / Yoo Hae-won

=== Top half ===
First Round
(South Korea) Choi H-i (South Korea) Park S-y	21	21
(Hong Kong) Chan T K (Hong Kong) Chau H W	14	12
5	(China) Bao YX (China) Tang JH	21	21
(South Korea) Chae Y-j (South Korea) Kim J-w	11	17
(Thailand) S Amitrapai (Thailand) L Narissapat	21	21
(Malaysia) A A Anscelly (Malaysia) Soong F C	17	14
4	(Thailand) D Aroonkesorn (Thailand) K Voravichitchaikul	14	12
(Indonesia) N K Maheswari (Indonesia) G Polii	21	21
(South Korea) Bang J-s (South Korea) Han Y-j	9	10
(Indonesia) V A P Lejarsari (Indonesia) V Marissa	21	21
7	(China) Ma J (China) Tang YT	21	21
(South Korea) Kim C-h (South Korea) Lee N-r	11	11
(Indonesia) S R Andini (Indonesia) T R Nuraidah	21	21
(England) H Olver (England) K Robertshaw	17	15

Second Round
1	(China) Wang XL (China) Yu Y	w	/	o
(South Korea) Choi H-i (South Korea) Park S-y
5	(China) Bao YX (China) Tang JH	21	21
(Thailand) S Amitrapai (Thailand) L Narissapat	15	13
(Indonesia) N K Maheswari (Indonesia) G Polii	20	21	21
(Indonesia) V A P Lejarsari (Indonesia) V Marissa	22	8	13
7	(China) Ma J (China) Tang YT	21	11	21
(Indonesia) S R Andini (Indonesia) T R Nuraidah	17	21	13

Quarterfinals
(South Korea) Choi H-i (South Korea) Park S-y	8	16
5	(China) Bao YX (China) Tang JH	21	21
(Indonesia) N K Maheswari (Indonesia) G Polii	21	5	21
7	(China) Ma J (China) Tang YT	18	21	13

Semifinals
5	(China) Bao YX (China) Tang JH	21	19	21
(Indonesia) N K Maheswari (Indonesia) G Polii	5	21	11

=== Bottom half ===
First Round
(Thailand) J Kittiharakul (Thailand) R Prajongjai	17	14
(Japan) Y Miki (Japan) K Yonemoto	21	21
(South Korea) Kim H-j (South Korea) Kong H-y	15	21	11
6	(Japan) R Kakiiwa (Japan) M Maeda	21	15	21
(New Zealand) A Rankin (New Zealand) M Stapleton	10	7
(India) J Gutta (India) A Ponnappa	21	21
(Germany) J Goliszewski (Germany) B Michels	20	21	16
3	(South Korea) Jang Y-n (South Korea) Kim S-y	22	17	21
(China) Luo Y (China) Luo Y	21	21
(Thailand) P Supajirakul (Thailand) S Taerattanachai	8	6
(Japan) M Aratama (Japan) M Taruno	20	9
8	(South Korea) Go A-r (South Korea) Yoo H-w	22	21
(England) G Adcock (England) L Smith	19	19
(South Korea) Jung K-e (South Korea) Shin S-c	21	21
(Indonesia) A S Awanda (Indonesia) D D Haris	16	12
2	(Japan) M Matsutomo (Japan) A Takahashi	21	21

Second Round
(Japan) Y Miki (Japan) K Yonemoto	15	16
6	(Japan) R Kakiiwa (Japan) M Maeda	21	21
(India) J Gutta (India) A Ponnappa	10	7
3	(South Korea) Jang Y-n (South Korea) Kim S-y	21	21
(China) Luo Y (China) Luo Y	21	21
8	(South Korea) Go A-r (South Korea) Yoo H-w	16	14
(South Korea) Jung K-e (South Korea) Shin S-c	22	14
2	(Japan) M Matsutomo (Japan) A Takahashi	24	21

Quarterfinals
6	(Japan) R Kakiiwa (Japan) M Maeda	22	21
3	(South Korea) Jang Y-n (South Korea) Kim S-y	20	14
(China) Luo Y (China) Luo Y	21	23
2	(Japan) M Matsutomo (Japan) A Takahashi	13	21

Semifinals
6	(Japan) R Kakiiwa (Japan) M Maeda	16	13
(China) Luo Y (China) Luo Y	21	21

=== Finals ===
Semifinals
5	(China) Bao Yixin (China) Tang Jinhua	21	19	21
(Indonesia) Nitya Krishinda Maheswari (Indonesia) Greysia Polii	5	21	11
6	(Japan) Reika Kakiiwa (Japan) Miyuki Maeda	16	13
(China) Luo Ying (China) Luo Yu	21	21

Final
5	(China) Bao Yixin (China) Tang Jinhua	21	21
(China) Luo Ying (China) Luo Yu	17	15

== Mixed doubles ==
=== Seeds ===
1. (China) Zhang Nan / Zhao Yunlei
2. (China) Xu Chen / Ma Jin
3. (England) Chris Adcock / Gabrielle Adcock
4. (Malaysia) Chan Peng Soon / Goh Liu Ying
5. (Thailand) Sudket Prapakamol / Saralee Thoungthongkam
6. (Hong Kong) Lee Chun Hei / Chau Hoi Wah
7. (Germany) Michael Fuchs / Birgit Michels
8. (Indonesia) Muhammad Rijal / Vita Marissa

=== Top half ===
First Round
1	(China) Zhang N (China) Zhao YL	21	21
(South Korea) Shin B-c (South Korea) Eom H-w	14	8
(South Korea) Yoo Y-s (South Korea) Jang Y-n	21	21
(Japan) T Kamura (Japan) K Yonemoto	14	15
5	(Thailand) S Prapakamol (Thailand) S Thoungthongkam	21	21
Q2	(South Korea) Kim J-h (South Korea) Kong H-y	16	10
DNS	(Russia) E Dremin (Russia) E Dimova
(South Korea) Choi S-k (South Korea) Chae Y-j
3	(England) C Adcock (England) G Adcock	21	21
(South Korea) Jun B-c (South Korea) Go A-r	11	10
PFQ	(South Korea) Lee S-j (South Korea) Yoo H-w	14	21
(Thailand) N Puangpuapech (Thailand) P Supajirakul	21	23
8	(Indonesia) M Rijal (Indonesia) V Marissa	18	19
(Hong Kong) Chan Y L (Hong Kong) Tse Y S	21	21
(South Korea) Kang J-w (South Korea) Choi H-i	21	21
(England) C Langridge (England) H Olver	13	19

Second Round
1	(China) Zhang N (China) Zhao YL	21	21
(South Korea) Yoo Y-s (South Korea) Jang Y-n	16	13
5	(Thailand) S Prapakamol (Thailand) S Thoungthongkam	21	22
(South Korea) Choi S-k (South Korea) Chae Y-j	18	20
3	(England) C Adcock (England) G Adcock	21	21
(Thailand) N Puangpuapech (Thailand) P Supajirakul	13	12
(Hong Kong) Chan Y L (Hong Kong) Tse Y S	26	21
(South Korea) Kang J-w (South Korea) Choi H-i	24	11

Quarterfinals
1	(China) Zhang N (China) Zhao YL	21	21
5	(Thailand) S Prapakamol (Thailand) S Thoungthongkam	15	16
3	(England) C Adcock (England) G Adcock	16	16
(Hong Kong) Chan Y L (Hong Kong) Tse Y S	21	21

Semifinals
1	(China) Zhang N (China) Zhao YL	21	21
(Hong Kong) Chan Y L (Hong Kong) Tse Y S	16	12

=== Bottom half ===
First Round
(China) Liu C (China) Bao YX	21	21
(Japan) K Hayakawa (Japan) M Matsutomo	17	16
(Indonesia) I Fadhilah (Indonesia) W Anggraini	15	21	15
6	(Hong Kong) Lee C H (Hong Kong) Chau H W	21	19	21
(Denmark) A Kristiansen (Denmark) J Houmann	21	21
Q4	(South Korea) Bae K-y (South Korea) Park S-y	14	7
(Thailand) M Jongjit (Thailand) S Taerattanachai	21	21
PFQ	(South Korea) Park K-h (South Korea) Han Y-j	15	10
(Germany) J Schöttler (Germany) J Goliszewski	20	17
(India) T Kona (India) A Ponnappa	22	21
Q3	(South Korea) Seo S-j (South Korea) Kim H-j	11	15
7	(Germany) M Fuchs (Germany) B Michels	21	21
Q1	(South Korea) Kim D-s (South Korea) Kim J-w	18	13
(South Korea) Lee Y-d (South Korea) Shin S-c	21	21
(Japan) H Hashimoto (Japan) M Maeda	11	8
2	(China) Xu C (China) Ma J	21	21

Second Round
(China) Liu C (China) Bao YX	21	11	22
6	(Hong Kong) Lee C H (Hong Kong) Chau H W	15	21	20
(Denmark) A Kristiansen (Denmark) J Houmann	11	17
(Thailand) M Jongjit (Thailand) S Taerattanachai	21	21
(India) T Kona (India) A Ponnappa	10	15
7	(Germany) M Fuchs (Germany) B Michels	21	21
(South Korea) Lee Y-d (South Korea) Shin S-c	6	17
2	(China) Xu C (China) Ma J	21	21

Quarterfinals
(China) Liu C (China) Bao YX	21	21
(Thailand) M Jongjit (Thailand) S Taerattanachai	13	14
7	(Germany) M Fuchs (Germany) B Michels	19	12
2	(China) Xu C (China) Ma J	21	21

Semifinals
(China) Liu C (China) Bao YX	14	10
2	(China) Xu C (China) Ma J	21	21

=== Finals ===
Semifinals
1	(China) Zhang Nan (China) Zhao Yunlei	21	21
(Hong Kong) Chan Yun Lung (Hong Kong) Tse Ying Suet	16	12
(China) Liu Cheng (China) Bao Yixin	14	10
2	(China) Xu Chen (China) Ma Jin	21	21

Final
1	(China) Zhang Nan (China) Zhao Yunlei	21	21
2	(China) Xu Chen (China) Ma Jin	18	18

Preceded by 2013 Korea Open Super Series Premier	Korea Open	Succeeded by 2015 Korea Open Super Series
Preceded by 2013 BWF Super Series Masters Finals	BWF Super Series; 2014 season	Succeeded by 2014 Malaysia Super Series Premier
