= 2007 BWF World Junior Championships – mixed doubles =

2007 BWF World Junior Championships mixed doubles
Tournament details
- Dates: 30 October 2007 – 4 November 2007
- Edition: 9th
- Level: International
- Venue: Waitakere Trusts Stadium
- Location: Waitakere City, New Zealand

The mixed doubles event for the 2007 BWF World Junior Championships was held between 30 October and 4 November. Lim Khim Wah and Ng Hui Lin of Malaysia won the title.

== Seeded ==
1. (Malaysia) Tan Wee Kiong / Woon Khe Wei (fourth round)
2. (Malaysia) Lim Khim Wah / Ng Hui Lin (champion)
3. (England) Chris Adcock / Gabrielle White (final)
4. (Denmark) Mikkel Elbjorn Larsen / Anne Skelbaek (second round)
5. (England) Marcus Ellis / Samantha Ward (third round)
6. (Singapore) Terry Yeo Zhao Jiang / Yao Lei (fourth round)
7. (Malaysia) Mohd Lutfi Zaim Abdul Khalid / Goh Liu Ying (quarter-final)
8. (Germany) Josche Zurwonne / Dana Kaufhold (third round)
9. (Scotland) Kieran Merrilees / Linda Sloan (second round)
10. (Sweden) Henrik Fahlstrom / Amanda Hogstrom (third round)
11. (Australia) Boris Ma / Victoria Na (second round)
12. (South Korea) Shin Baek-cheol / Yoo Hyun-Young (semi-final)
13. (New Zealand) Delius Tang / Kritteka Gregory (second round)
14. (Indonesia) Afiat Yuris Wirawan / Debby Susanto (semi-final)
15. (Puerto Rico) Hector Rios / Keara Gonzalez (second round)
16. (Chinese Taipei) Cheng Po-Hsuan / Peng Hsiao-Chu (third round)

== Draw ==
=== Finals ===
Quarterfinals
12	(South Korea) Shin Baek-cheol (South Korea) Yoo Hyun-Young	18	21	21
7	(Malaysia) M Lutfi Z. Abdul Khalid (Malaysia) Goh Liu Ying	21	16	16
3	(England) Chris Adcock (England) Gabrielle White	21	21
(Indonesia) Muhammad Ulinnuha (Indonesia) Richi Puspita Dili	12	11
14	(Indonesia) Afiat Yuris Wirawan (Indonesia) Debby Susanto	21	23
(Thailand) Maneepong Jongjit (Thailand) Rodjana Chuthabunditkul	9	21
(China) Qiu Zihan (China) Zhong Qianxin	8	7
2	(Malaysia) Lim Khim Wah (Malaysia) Ng Hui Lin	21	21

Semifinals
12	(South Korea) Shin Baek-cheol (South Korea) Yoo Hyun-Young	20	16
3	(England) Chris Adcock (England) Gabrielle White	22	21
14	(Indonesia) Afiat Yuris Wirawan (Indonesia) Debby Susanto	16	8
2	(Malaysia) Lim Khim Wah (Malaysia) Ng Hui Lin	21	21

Final
3	(England) Chris Adcock (England) Gabrielle White	25	20	19
2	(Malaysia) Lim Khim Wah (Malaysia) Ng Hui Lin	23	22	21

=== Top half ===
==== Section 1 ====
First round
(New Zealand) A Dhoray (New Zealand) E Chapple	21	21
(Czech Republic) P Hosek (Czech Republic) S Krizkova	16	17
(Puerto Rico) F Sustache (Puerto Rico) D Santana	3	6
(Japan) T Kamura (Japan) M Sakurai	21	21

Second round
1	(Malaysia) Tan WK (Malaysia) Woon KW	21	21
(Philippines) P Sunga (Philippines) K Velez	9	10
(Indonesia) W Windarto (Indonesia) PZ Bernadet	21	21
(New Zealand) A Dhoray (New Zealand) E Chapple	8	5
12	(South Korea) Shin B-C (South Korea) Yoo H-Y	21	21
(South Africa) R Louw (South Africa) J Fry	1	5
(United States) R Hsia (United States) B Neumann	5	8
(Japan) T Kamura (Japan) M Sakurai	21	21

Third round
1	(Malaysia) Tan WK (Malaysia) Woon KW	21	21
(Indonesia) W Windarto (Indonesia) PZ Bernadet	10	8
12	(South Korea) Shin B-C (South Korea) Yoo H-Y	21	21
(Japan) T Kamura (Japan) M Sakurai	17	5

Fourth round
1	(Malaysia) Tan WK (Malaysia) Woon KW	21	16	9
12	(South Korea) Shin B-C (South Korea) Yoo H-Y	12	21	21

==== Section 2 ====
First round
(Turkey) H Durakcan (Turkey) E Epice	21	21
(Philippines) C Paguio (Philippines) M Yupangco	14	6
(Netherlands) J Hilbink (Netherlands) Wong YM	7	12
(South Korea) Kim K-E (South Korea) Lee S-R	21	21

Second round
7	(Malaysia) M Abdul Khalid (Malaysia) Goh LY	21	21
(India) T Kona (India) A Ponnappa	18	18
(Bulgaria) V Paskov (Bulgaria) B Maneva	16	21
(Turkey) H Durakcan (Turkey) E Epice	21	23
13	(New Zealand) D Tang (New Zealand) K Gregory	17	18
(Singapore) Thng BS (Singapore) Thng TT	21	21
(Japan) Y Yamasaki (Japan) A Murakami	21	21
(South Korea) Kim K-E (South Korea) Lee S-R	16	11

Third round
7	(Malaysia) M Abdul Khalid (Malaysia) Goh LY	21	21
(Turkey) H Durakcan (Turkey) E Epice	18	10
(Singapore) Thng BS (Singapore) Thng TT	17	14
(Japan) Y Yamasaki (Japan) A Murakami	21	21

Fourth round
7	(Malaysia) M Abdul Khalid (Malaysia) Goh LY	24	21
(Japan) Y Yamasaki (Japan) A Murakami	22	16

==== Section 3 ====
First round
(New Zealand) K Dennerly-Minturn (New Zealand) S Cheng	18	16
(Russia) G Kosenko (Russia) V Ushkova	21	21
(Netherlands) J Maas (Netherlands) P Stolzenbach	17	22
(Hong Kong) Wong WK (Hong Kong) Tse YS	21	24

Second round
3	(England) C Adcock (England) G White	21	23
(Chinese Taipei) Wang Y-P (Chinese Taipei) Cheng W-H	10	21
(Vietnam) Nguyen NT (Vietnam) Nguyen THA	21	11	9
(Russia) G Kosenko (Russia) V Ushkova	18	21	21
11	(Australia) B Ma (Australia) V Na	13	13
(Chinese Taipei) Hsu J-H (Chinese Taipei) Chiang K-H	21	21
(China) Li T (China) Wang XL	21	21
(Hong Kong) Wong WK (Hong Kong) Tse YS	10	8

Third round
3	(England) C Adcock (England) G White	21	21
(Russia) G Kosenko (Russia) V Ushkova	12	16
(Chinese Taipei) Hsu J-H (Chinese Taipei) Chiang K-H	15	13
(China) Li T (China) Wang XL	21	21

Fourth round
3	(England) C Adcock (England) G White	13	21	21
(China) Li T (China) Wang XL	21	16	19

==== Section 4 ====
First round
(Indonesia) M Ulinnuha (Indonesia) R Dili	21	21
(Singapore) J Wong (Singapore) Mok JQ	6	11
(Malaysia) V Mawan (Malaysia) Ho BL
(Kyrgyzstan) A Kubakaev (Kyrgyzstan) D Zvereva	WO

Second round
8	(Germany) J Zurwonne (Germany) D Kaufhold	21	21
(Denmark) D Prehn (Denmark) M Helsbol	13	18
(Thailand) P Lertpanyaroj (Thailand) P Wangpaiboonkj	16	13
(Indonesia) M Ulinnuha (Indonesia) R Dili	21	21
10	(Sweden) H Fahlstrom (Sweden) A Hogstrom	21	21
(Puerto Rico) S Soto (Puerto Rico) I Gonzalez	10	10
(Scotland) P Van Rietvelde (Scotland) G Sloan	10	15
(Malaysia) V Mawan (Malaysia) Ho BL	21	21

Third round
8	(Germany) J Zurwonne (Germany) D Kaufhold	18	19
(Indonesia) M Ulinnuha (Indonesia) R Dili	21	21
10	(Sweden) H Fahlstrom (Sweden) A Hogstrom	10	12
(Malaysia) V Mawan (Malaysia) Ho BL	21	21

Fourth round
(Indonesia) M Ulinnuha (Indonesia) R Dili	19	21	21
(Malaysia) V Mawan (Malaysia) Ho BL	21	19	12

=== Bottom half ===
==== Section 5 ====
First round
(South Korea) Kim K-J (South Korea) Choi H-I	21	21
(Australia) K Ng (Australia) L Choo	17	11
(Philippines) K Vinarao (Philippines) C Lizardo
(Kyrgyzstan) D Babaev (Kyrgyzstan) I Kuligina	WO
(South Korea) Chung E-S (South Korea) Jung K-E	21	21
(Philippines) E Puyat (Philippines) J Paredes	8	1

Second round
(South Korea) Kim K-J (South Korea) Choi H-I	21	21
(Philippines) K Vinarao (Philippines) C Lizardo	3	3
(Hong Kong) Lam YY (Hong Kong) Tung YH	14	11
14	(Indonesia) A Wirawan (Indonesia) D Susanto	21	21
(South Korea) Chung E-S (South Korea) Jung K-E	14	21	2p
(Japan) S Wada (Japan) M Nojirino	21	19	22
(Mongolia) B Batbayar (Mongolia) U Turtogtokh	WO
6	(Singapore) T Yeo (Singapore) Yao L

Third round
(South Korea) Kim K-J (South Korea) Choi H-I	18	21	16
14	(Indonesia) A Wirawan (Indonesia) D Susanto	21	17	21
(Japan) S Wada (Japan) M Nojirino	18	11
6	(Singapore) T Yeo (Singapore) Yao L	21	21

Fourth round
14	(Indonesia) A Wirawan (Indonesia) D Susanto	21	21
6	(Singapore) T Yeo (Singapore) Yao L	15	18

==== Section 6 ====
First round
(Russia) I Sozonov (Russia) K Polikarpova	21	21
(South Africa) J Maliekal (South Africa) D Godfrey	11	11
(Czech Republic) M Teller (Czech Republic) E Maixnerova	12	5
(China) Zhang N (China) Chen Z	21	21

Second round
(Russia) I Sozonov (Russia) K Polikarpova	21	21
(Australia) J Cracknell (Mexico) D Angulo	11	10
(Germany) S Rduch (Germany) C Nelte	21	17	17
16	(Chinese Taipei) Cheng P-H (Chinese Taipei) Peng H-C	18	21	21
(China) Zhang N (China) Chen Z	21	21
(Netherlands) J Arends (Netherlands) S Piek	16	16
(Thailand) M Jongjit (Thailand) R Chuthabunditkul	22	21
4	(Denmark) M Larsen (Denmark) A Skelbaek	20	18

Third round
(Russia) I Sozonov (Russia) K Polikarpova	20	21	22
16	(Chinese Taipei) Cheng P-H (Chinese Taipei) Peng H-C	22	12	20
(China) Zhang N (China) Chen Z	17	15
(Thailand) M Jongjit (Thailand) R Chuthabunditkul	21	21

Fourth round
(Russia) I Sozonov (Russia) K Polikarpova	17	19
(Thailand) M Jongjit (Thailand) R Chuthabunditkul	21	21

==== Section 7 ====
First round
(New Zealand) O Leydon-Davis (New Zealand) E Ang	10	14
(Japan) K Noguchi (Japan) Y Miki	21	21
(Chinese Taipei) Lu C-Y (Chinese Taipei) Tien C-Y	21	21
(Vietnam) Dao MT (Vietnam) Nguyen TNT	16	17

Second round
(Japan) K Noguchi (Japan) Y Miki	21	21
(Germany) A Heinz (Germany) L Deichgraeber	13	16
(Australia) K Yuen (United States) C Chow	21	21
15	(Puerto Rico) H Rios (Puerto Rico) K Gonzalez	15	11
(Chinese Taipei) Lu C-Y (Chinese Taipei) Tien C-Y	15	8
(China) Qiu ZH (China) Zhong QX	21	21
(Turkey) N Ozkan (Turkey) R Kemer	12	13
5	(England) M Ellis (England) S Ward	21	21

Third round
(Japan) K Noguchi (Japan) Y Miki	21	21
(Australia) K Yuen (United States) C Chow	10	7
(China) Qiu ZH (China) Zhong QX	18	21	24
5	(England) M Ellis (England) S Ward	21	17	22

Fourth round
(Japan) K Noguchi (Japan) Y Miki	20	15
(China) Qiu ZH (China) Zhong QX	22	21

==== Section 8 ====
First round
(Indonesia) H Mulyono (Indonesia) N Gideon	21	21
(Hong Kong) Yau TT (Hong Kong) Poon LY	16	15
(Bulgaria) I Krastev (Bulgaria) D Popstoikova	19	19
(India) V Ram (India) R Misha	21	21

Second round
(Indonesia) H Mulyono (Indonesia) N Gideon	21	21
(England) A Cheung (England) S Walker	18	13
(Germany) P Welker (Germany) F Deprez	21	21
9	(Scotland) K Merrilees (Scotland) L Sloan	11	10
(India) V Ram (India) R Misha	6	22	17
(China) Chai B (China) Xie J	21	20	21
(United States) B Lum (United States) I Zhong	9	4
2	(Malaysia) Lim KW (Malaysia) Ng HL	21	21

Third round
(Indonesia) H Mulyono (Indonesia) N Gideon	16	20
(Germany) P Welker (Germany) F Deprez	21	22
(China) Chai B (China) Xie J	21	9
2	(Malaysia) Lim KW (Malaysia) Ng HL	23	21

Fourth round
(Germany) P Welker (Germany) F Deprez	14	10
2	(Malaysia) Lim KW (Malaysia) Ng HL	21	21
