= Lim Khim Wah =

Malaysian badminton player

Lim Khim Wah 林钦华
Personal information
- Born: 29 April 1989 (age 37) Penang, Malaysia
- Height: 1.70 m (5 ft 7 in)

Sport
- Country: Malaysia
- Sport: Badminton
- Handedness: Left
- Coached by: Pang Cheh Chang

Men's & mixed doubles
- Highest ranking: 11 (MD with Goh V Shem 30 May 2013)
- Current ranking: 68 (MD with Goh V Shem), 184 (MD with Nur Mohd Azriyn Ayub) (6 June 2023)
- BWF profile
Medal record
Men's badminton
Representing Malaysia
Thomas Cup
Silver medal – second place	2014 New Delhi	Men's team
Asian Games
Bronze medal – third place	2014 Incheon	Men's team
Asian Championships
Bronze medal – third place	2013 Taipei	Men's doubles
Southeast Asian Games
Silver medal – second place	2011 Jakarta–Palembang	Men's team
Bronze medal – third place	2011 Jakarta–Palembang	Men's doubles
Bronze medal – third place	2013 Naypyidaw	Men's doubles
World Junior Championships
Gold medal – first place	2007 Waitakere City	Mixed doubles
Bronze medal – third place	2006 Incheon	Boys' doubles
Bronze medal – third place	2006 Incheon	Mixed team
Bronze medal – third place	2007 Waitakere City	Boys' doubles
Asia Junior Championships
Gold medal – first place	2007 Kuala Lumpur	Mixed team
Silver medal – second place	2006 Kuala Lumpur	Mixed team
Bronze medal – third place	2006 Kuala Lumpur	Boys' doubles
Bronze medal – third place	2007 Kuala Lumpur	Mixed doubles

Lim Khim Wah (born 29 April 1989) is a Malaysian badminton player from Penang who plays in the doubles category. His men's doubles partner was Goh V Shem until late 2014. They two won their first Superseries title at the 2014 Malaysia Open. Together with Goh, Lim reached a career high as world number 11 in the men's doubles in May 2013. In 2015, Lim resigned from the Badminton Association of Malaysia. In 2022, Lim teamed up with Nur Mohd Azyriyn Ayub, they started their career in three back-to-back tournaments in India, with the India Open as the first tournament.

== Achievements ==
=== Asian Championships ===
Men's doubles
Year	Venue	Partner	Opponent	Score	Result
2013	Taipei Arena; Taipei, Taiwan	(Malaysia) Goh V Shem	(South Korea) Ko Sung-hyun (South Korea) Lee Yong-dae	17–21, 16–21	Bronze

=== Southeast Asian Games ===
Men's doubles
Year	Venue	Partner	Opponent	Score	Result
2011	Istora Gelora Bung Karno; Jakarta, Indonesia	(Malaysia) Goh V Shem	(Indonesia) Markis Kido (Indonesia) Hendra Setiawan	13–21, 21–17, 19–21	Bronze
2013	Wunna Theikdi Indoor Stadium; Naypyidaw, Myanmar	(Malaysia) Ow Yao Han	(Indonesia) Angga Pratama (Indonesia) Rian Agung Saputro	16–21, 15–21	Bronze

=== BWF World Junior Championships ===
Boys' doubles
Year	Venue	Partner	Opponent	Score	Result
2006	Samsan World Gymnasium; Incheon, South Korea	(Malaysia) Mak Hee Chun	(South Korea) Cho Gun-woo (South Korea) Lee Yong-dae	6–21, 11–21	Bronze
2007	The Trusts Stadium; Waitakere City, New Zealand	(Malaysia) Mak Hee Chun	(South Korea) Chung Eui-seok (South Korea) Shin Baek-cheol	13–21, 13–21	Bronze

Mixed doubles
Year	Venue	Partner	Opponent	Score	Result
2007	The Trusts Stadium; Waitakere City, New Zealand	(Malaysia) Ng Hui Lin	(England) Chris Adcock (England) Gabrielle White	23–25, 22–20, 21–19	Gold

=== Asian Junior Championships ===
Boys' doubles
Year	Venue	Partner	Opponent	Score	Result
2006	Kuala Lumpur Badminton Stadium; Kuala Lumpur, Malaysia	(Malaysia) Mak Hee Chun	(South Korea) Cho Gun-woo (South Korea) Lee Yong-dae	11–21, 15–21	Bronze

Mixed doubles
Year	Venue	Partner	Opponent	Score	Result
2007	Stadium Juara; Kuala Lumpur, Malaysia	(Malaysia) Ng Hui Lin	(South Korea) Shin Baek-cheol (South Korea) Yoo Hyun-young	15–21, 11–21	Bronze

=== BWF World Tour (1 title) ===
The BWF World Tour, which was announced on 19 March 2017 and implemented in 2018, is a series of elite badminton tournaments sanctioned by the Badminton World Federation (BWF). The BWF World Tours are divided into levels of World Tour Finals, Super 1000, Super 750, Super 500, Super 300 (part of the HSBC World Tour), and the BWF Tour Super 100.

Men's doubles
Year	Tournament	Level	Partner	Opponent	Score	Result
2022	Odisha Open	Super 100	(Malaysia) Nur Mohd Azriyn Ayub	(India) P. S. Ravikrishna (India) Sankar Prasad Udayakumar	18–21, 21–14, 21–16	(gold) Winner

=== BWF Superseries (1 title) ===
The BWF Superseries, which was launched on 14 December 2006 and implemented in 2007, was a series of elite badminton tournaments, sanctioned by the Badminton World Federation (BWF). BWF Superseries levels were Superseries and Superseries Premier. A season of Superseries consisted of twelve tournaments around the world that had been introduced since 2011. Successful players were invited to the Superseries Finals, which were held at the end of each year.

Men's doubles
Year	Tournament	Partner	Opponent	Score	Result
2014	Malaysia Open	(Malaysia) Goh V Shem	(China) Chai Biao (China) Hong Wei	21–19, 21–18	(gold) Winner

BWF Super Series Finals tournament
BWF Super Series Premier tournament
BWF Super Series tournament

=== BWF Grand Prix (2 titles, 2 runners-up) ===
The BWF Grand Prix had two levels, the Grand Prix and Grand Prix Gold. It was a series of badminton tournaments sanctioned by the Badminton World Federation (BWF) and played between 2007 and 2017.

Men's doubles
Year	Tournament	Partner	Opponent	Score	Result
2009	Thailand Open	(Malaysia) Chan Peng Soon	(Malaysia) Choong Tan Fook (Malaysia) Lee Wan Wah	20–22, 21–14, 21–11	(gold) Winner
2013	Malaysia Grand Prix Gold	(Malaysia) Goh V Shem	(Malaysia) Koo Kien Keat (Malaysia) Tan Boon Heong	22–20, 21–15	(gold) Winner
2014	Malaysia Grand Prix Gold	(Malaysia) Goh V Shem	(Singapore) Danny Bawa Chrisnanta (Singapore) Chayut Triyachart	17–21, 20–22	(silver) Runner-up
2015	Chinese Taipei Masters	(Malaysia) Hoon Thien How	(Indonesia) Marcus Fernaldi Gideon (Indonesia) Kevin Sanjaya Sukamuljo	12–21, 8–21	(silver) Runner-up

BWF Grand Prix Gold tournament
BWF Grand Prix tournament

=== BWF International Challenge/Series (4 titles, 2 runners-up) ===
Men's doubles
Year	Tournament	Partner	Opponent	Score	Result
2009	Malaysia International	(Malaysia) Chan Peng Soon	(Thailand) Bodin Isara (Thailand) Maneepong Jongjit	22–20, 28–26	(gold) Winner
2010	Malaysia International	(Malaysia) Goh V Shem	(Indonesia) Rahmat Adianto (Indonesia) Andrei Adistia	21–15, 21–16	(gold) Winner
2018	Dubai International	(India) Tarun Kona	(South Korea) Kim Sang-soo (South Korea) Yoo Yeon-seong	16–21, 9–21	(silver) Runner-up

Mixed doubles
Year	Tournament	Partner	Opponent	Score	Result
2007	Malaysia International	(Malaysia) Ng Hui Lin	(Malaysia) Tan Wee Kiong (Malaysia) Woon Khe Wei	21–15, 21–14	(silver) Runner-up
2008	Vietnam International	(Malaysia) Ng Hui Lin	(Malaysia) Mohd Razif Abdul Latif (Malaysia) Chong Sook Chin	21–15, 19–21, 21–15	(gold) Winner
2010	Malaysia International	(Malaysia) Chong Sook Chin	(Malaysia) Mohd Razif Abdul Latif (Malaysia) Amelia Alicia Anscelly	30–28, 21–13	(gold) Winner

BWF International Challenge tournament
BWF International Series tournament
