= 2007 BWF World Junior Championships – boys' doubles =

2007 BWF World Junior Championships boys' doubles
Tournament details
- Dates: 30 October 2007 – 4 November 2007
- Edition: 9th
- Level: International
- Venue: Waitakere Trusts Stadium
- Location: Waitakere City, New Zealand

The boys' doubles event for the 2007 BWF World Junior Championships was held between 30 October and 4 November. Shin Baek-cheol and Chung Eui-seok of South Korea won the title.

== Seeded ==
1. (China) Li Tian / Chai Biao (final)
2. (Malaysia) Lim Khim Wah / Mak Hee Chun (semi-final)
3. (England) Chris Adcock / Marcus Ellis (quarter-final)
4. (China) Zhang Nan / Qiu Zihan (quarter-final)
5. (Indonesia) Afiat Yuris Wirawan / Wifqi Windarto (quarter-final)
6. (Denmark) Mikkel Elbjorn Larsen / Emil Holst (third round)
7. (Germany) Sebastian Rduch / Josche Zurwonne (third round)
8. (Malaysia) Ong Jian Guo / Goh V Shem (semi-final)

== Draw ==
=== Finals ===
Semifinals
1	(China) Li Tian (China) Chai Biao	21	21
8	(Malaysia) Ong Jian Guo (Malaysia) Goh V Shem	12	16
(South Korea) Chung Eui-Seok (South Korea) Shin Baek-cheol	21	21
2	(Malaysia) Lim Khim Wah (Malaysia) Mak Hee Chun	13	13

Final
1	(China) Li Tian (China) Chai Biao	26	19	15
(South Korea) Chung Eui-Seok (South Korea) Shin Baek-cheol	24	21	21

==== Section 1 ====
First round
(United States) R Hsia (United States) B Lum	25	18	19
(Philippines) A Babad (Philippines) J Arollado	23	21	21
(Japan) K Sonoda (Japan) T Kamura	21	21
(Indonesia) M Ulinnuha (Indonesia) R Adianto	14	10

Second round
1	(China) Li T (China) Chai B	21	21
(India) R Gurusaidutt (India) T Kona	11	15
(Puerto Rico) H Rios (Puerto Rico) S Soto	19	11
(Philippines) A Babad (Philippines) J Arollado	21	21
7	(Germany) S Rduch (Germany) J Zurwonne	21	21
(Hong Kong) Yau TT (Hong Kong) Lam YY	13	17
(Bulgaria) P Boichinov (Bulgaria) I Krastev	7	7
(Japan) K Sonoda (Japan) T Kamura	21	21

Third round
1	(China) Li T (China) Chai B	21	21
(Philippines) A Babad (Philippines) J Arollado	10	8
7	(Germany) S Rduch (Germany) J Zurwonne	6	10
(Japan) K Sonoda (Japan) T Kamura	21	21

Quarterfinal
1	(China) Li T (China) Chai B	20	21	21
(Japan) K Sonoda (Japan) T Kamura	22	18	13

==== Section 2 ====
First round
(Bulgaria) V Paskov (Puerto Rico) S Francis	14	18
(New Zealand) E Haggo (New Zealand) A Doray	21	21
(Mongolia) B Batbayar (Mongolia) U Enkhbat	WO
(Russia) I Sozonov (Russia) G Kosenko
(South Korea) Kim K-E (South Korea) Kim K-J	21	21
(Vietnam) Bui QT (Vietnam) Nguyen NT	9	10

Second round
3	(England) C Adcock (England) M Ellis	21	21
(Australia) B Ma (Australia) J Cracknell	7	5
(Thailand) B Issara (Thailand) P Lertpanyaroj	21	21
(New Zealand) E Haggo (New Zealand) A Doray	13	12
8	(Malaysia) Ong JG (Malaysia) Goh VS	21	21
(Turkey) N Ozkan (Turkey) K Akcebe	6	11
(Russia) I Sozonov (Russia) G Kosenko	20	10
(South Korea) Kim K-E (South Korea) Kim K-J	22	21

Third round
3	(England) C Adcock (England) M Ellis	21	21
(Thailand) B Issara (Thailand) P Lertpanyaroj	17	19
8	(Malaysia) Ong JG (Malaysia) Goh VS	22	21
(South Korea) Kim K-E (South Korea) Kim K-J	20	18

Quarterfinal
3	(England) C Adcock (England) M Ellis	18	13
8	(Malaysia) Ong JG (Malaysia) Goh VS	21	21

==== Section 3 ====
First round
(Czech Republic) P Hosek (Czech Republic) M Teller
(Mongolia) T Erdenee (Mongolia) K Bayarsaikhan	WO
(South Korea) Chung E-S (South Korea) Shin B-C
(Kyrgyzstan) A Kubakaev (Kyrgyzstan) D Babaev	WO
(Vietnam) Bui BD (Vietnam) Dao MT	21	21
(South Africa) J Maliekal (South Africa) R Louw	13	12

Second round
(Czech Republic) P Hosek (Czech Republic) M Teller	11	7
(South Korea) Chung E-S (South Korea) Shin B-C	21	21
(India) A Nandaluri (India) R Vijay	21	14
6	(Denmark) M Larsen (Denmark) E Holst	23	21
(Vietnam) Bui BD (Vietnam) Dao MT	21	21
(Netherlands) J Arends (Netherlands) J Maas	11	15
(Chinese Taipei) Cheng P-H (Chinese Taipei) Wang Y-P	21	17	14
4	(China) Zhang N (China) Qiu ZH	17	21	21

Third round
(South Korea) Chung E-S (South Korea) Shin B-C	21	21
6	(Denmark) M Larsen (Denmark) E Holst	18	15
(Vietnam) Bui BD (Vietnam) Dao MT	11	23	13
4	(China) Zhang N (China) Qiu ZH	21	21	21

Quarterfinal
(South Korea) Chung E-S (South Korea) Shin B-C	15	25	21
4	(China) Zhang N (China) Qiu ZH	21	23	18

==== Section 4 ====
First round
(Japan) K Noguchi (Japan) Y Yamasaki	13	23	21
(Thailand) W Uttamang (Thailand) S Phaisansomsuk	21	21	14
(England) J Bonsels (England) A Cheung	WO
(Scotland) K Merrilees (Scotland) P Van Rietvelde
(New Zealand) D Tang (New Zealand) O Leydon-Davis	21	21
(Australia) K Yuen (Australia) K Ng	14	14

Second round
(Japan) K Noguchi (Japan) Y Yamasaki	21	21
(Scotland) K Merrilees (Scotland) P Van Rietvelde	14	13
(Philippines) R Sanchez (Philippines) E Puyat	7	9
5	(Indonesia) A Wirawan (Indonesia) W Windarto	21	21
(New Zealand) D Tang (New Zealand) O Leydon-Davis	18	21	21
(Singapore) T Yao (Singapore) Thng BS	21	13	19
(Germany) P Welker (Germany) A Heinz	6	9
2	(Malaysia) Lim KW (Malaysia) Mak HC	21	21

Third round
(Japan) K Noguchi (Japan) Y Yamasaki	16	21	13
5	(Indonesia) A Wirawan (Indonesia) W Windarto	21	15	21
(New Zealand) D Tang (New Zealand) O Leydon-Davis	14	11
2	(Malaysia) Lim KW (Malaysia) Mak HC	21	21

Quarterfinal
5	(Indonesia) A Wirawan (Indonesia) W Windarto	21	15	18
2	(Malaysia) Lim KW (Malaysia) Mak HC	16	21	21
