= 2006 BWF World Junior Championships – Boys' doubles =

2006 BWF World Junior Championships Boys' doubles
Tournament details
- Dates: 6 November 2006 – 11 November 2006
- Edition: 8th
- Level: International
- Venue: Samsan World Gymnasium
- Location: Incheon, South Korea

The Boys' doubles tournament of the 2006 BWF World Junior Championships is a badminton world junior individual championships for the Eye Level Cups, held on November 6–11. The defending champion of the last edition were Hoon Thien How and Tan Boon Heong from Malaysia. The host pair Lee Yong-dae and Cho Gun-woo won the gold medal in this event after beat Liu Xiaolong and Li Tian of China in straight games with the score 21–12, 21–16.

== Seeded ==
1. (South Korea) Lee Yong-Dae / Cho Gun-Woo (champion)
2. (Malaysia) Mohd Razif Abdul Latif / Vountus Indra Mawan (quarter-final)
3. (Denmark) Mads Pieler Kolding / Mads Conrad-Petersen (third round)
4. (Malaysia) Lim Khim Wah / Mak Hee Chun (semi-final)
5. (Indonesia) Fernando Kurniawan / Subakti (third round)
6. (India) Jishnu Sanyal / Akshay Dewalkar (quarter-final)
7. (New Zealand) Henry Tam / Kevin Dennerly-Minturn (second round)
8. (Singapore) Derek Wong Zi Liang / Jonathan Tang Yew Loong (third round)

== Draw ==
=== Finals ===
Semifinals					Finals
1	(South Korea) Lee Yong-Dae (South Korea) Cho Gun-Woo	21	21
3/4	(Malaysia) Lim Khim Wah (Malaysia) Mak Hee Chun	6	11		1	(South Korea) Lee Yong-Dae (South Korea) Cho Gun-Woo	21	21
	(China) Liu Xiaolong (China) Li Tian	22	19	21		(China) Liu Xiaolong (China) Li Tian	12	16
	(South Korea) Kim Ki-Jung (South Korea) Lee Jung-Hwan	20	21	19

=== Top half ===
==== Section 1 ====
First round
(Australia) J Tho (Australia) E Tanaka	10	17
(China) Hu WQ (China) Zhang YD	21	21
(Indonesia) D Chrisnanta (Indonesia) A Wirawan	17	18
(Vietnam) Duong BD (Vietnam) Nguyen QT	21	21
(Chinese Taipei) Chen P-M (Chinese Taipei) Hsiao H-C	21	21
(Egypt) M El Sead (Egypt) R Ibrahim	12	9
(Turkey) H Durakcan (Turkey) G Kundakci	21	19	17
(Canada) J Rogers (Canada) A Cheong	18	21	21

Second round
1	(South Korea) Lee Y-D (South Korea) Cho G-W	21	21
(Germany) S Rduch (Germany) P Kaesbauer	10	7
(China) Hu WQ (China) Zhang YD	21	21
(Vietnam) Duong BD (Vietnam) Nguyen QT	10	8
5/8	(New Zealand) H Tam (New Zealand) K Dennerly-Minturn	17	12
(Japan) H Sasaki (Japan) T Ueda	21	21
(Chinese Taipei) Chen P-M (Chinese Taipei) Hsiao H-C	21	21
(Canada) J Rogers (Canada) A Cheong	17	13

Third round
1	(South Korea) Lee Y-D (South Korea) Cho G-W	21	21
(China) Hu WQ (China) Zhang YD	12	6
(Japan) H Sasaki (Japan) T Ueda	21	15	19
(Chinese Taipei) Chen P-M (Chinese Taipei) Hsian H-C	14	21	21

Quarter finals
1	(South Korea) Lee Y-D (South Korea) Cho G-W	21	21
(Chinese Taipei) Chen P-M (Chinese Taipei) Hsiao H-C	14	10

==== Section 2 ====
First round
(Cambodia) B Chendavongsei (Cambodia) E Davin	12	19
(Sri Lanka) T Perera (Sri Lanka) Y Ranasinghe	21	21
(Denmark) C Skovgaard (Denmark) C Larsen	21	21
(Macau) Lei K (Macau) Chi ML	8	15
(United States) B Hussey (United States) E Pun	13	10
(Russia) G Kosenko (Russia) E Klimkovian	21	21
(Netherlands) S Branderhorst (Netherlands) J Hilbink	18	14
(England) M Ellis (England) V Liew	21	21
(South Africa) R Abrahams (South Africa) R Brown	11	15
(Singapore) T Yeo (Singapore) Thng BS	21	21

Second round
3/4	(Malaysia) Lim KW (Malaysia) Mak HC	21	21
(Pakistan) M Ali (Pakistan) Z Ghazali	13	5
(Sri Lanka) T Perera (Sri Lanka) Y Ranasinghe	17	10
(Denmark) C Skovgaard (Denmark) C Larsen	21	21
5/8	(India) J Sanyal (India) A Dewalkar	21	20	21
(Russia) G Kosenko (Russia) E Klimkovian	19	22	9
(England) M Ellis (England) V Liew	21	21
(Singapore) T Yeo (Singapore) Thng BS	19	17

Third round
3/4	(Malaysia) Lim KW (Malaysia) Mak HC	21	21
(Denmark) C Skovgaard (Denmark) C Larsen	23	15	19
5/8	(India) J Sanyal (India) A Dewalkar	21	21
(England) M Ellis (England) V Liew	15	12

Quarter finals
3/4	(Malaysia) Lim KW (Malaysia) Mak HC	21	21
5/8	(India) J Sanyal (India) A Dewalkar	16	17

=== Bottom half ===
==== Section 3 ====
First round
(Bulgaria) T Hadzhiev (Bulgaria) I Krastev	12	15
(Hong Kong) Lau CY (Hong Kong) K Cai	21	21
(Japan) N Matsukawa (Japan) K Itani	21	21
(Canada) D Snider (Canada) B Fultz	10	11
(India) R Gurusaidutt (India) T Kona	21	21
(Macau) Ip TF (Macau) Lei T	9	8
(Chinese Taipei) Liao W-C (Chinese Taipei) Cheng P-H	21	14	21
(Vietnam) Duong PN (Vietnam) Pham NT	14	21	15
(China) Liu XL (Turkey) Li T	21	21
(Ukraine) D Zavadsky (Ukraine) A Burlaka	8	8

Second round
(Hong Kong) Lau CY (Hong Kong) K Cai	10	15
(Japan) N Matsukawa (Japan) K Itani	21	21
(India) R Gurusaidutt (India) T Kona	22	11	12
5/8	(Indonesia) F Kurniawan (Indonesia) Subakti	20	21	21
(Chinese Taipei) Liao W-C (Chinese Taipei) Cheng P-H	16	12
(China) Liu XL (Turkey) Li T	21	21
(Russia) I Sozonov (Russia) N Khakimov	WO
3/4	(Denmark) M Kolding (Denmark) M Conrad-Petersen

Third round
(Japan) N Matsukawa (Japan) K Itani	21	16	21
5/8	(Indonesia) F Kurniawan (Indonesia) Subakti	18	21	16
(China) Liu XL (China) Li T	22	20	23
3/4	(Denmark) M Kolding (Denmark) M Conrad-Petersen	20	22	21

Quarter finals
(Japan) N Matsukawa (Japan) K Itani	15	11
(China) Liu XL (China) Li T	21	21

==== Section 4 ====
First round
(New Zealand) E Haggo (New Zealand) J Eunson	21	17	9
(Philippines) A Gadi (Philippines) J Co	12	21	21
(United States) A Setiadi (United States) J Shu	16	11
(South Korea) Kim K-J (South Korea) Lee J-H	21	21
(Mongolia) D Battur (Mongolia) Z Munkhbaatar	11	10
(Czech Republic) J Bitman (Czech Republic) O Kopriva	21	21
(Australia) B Ma (Australia) S Gunaratne	21	18	21
(Cambodia) M Chanthan (Cambodia) V Chanpisey	18	21	16
(England) P Mills (England) C Adcock	21	21
(Sri Lanka) G Jayawardena (Sri Lanka) R Dhanayaka	9	12

Second round
(Philippines) A Gadi (Philippines) J Co	4	7
(South Korea) Kim K-J (South Korea) Lee J-H	21	21
(Czech Republic) J Bitman (Czech Republic) O Kopriva	19	14
5/8	(Singapore) D Wong (Singapore) J Tang	21	21
(Australia) B Ma (Australia) S Gunaratne	10	9
(England) P Mills (England) C Adcock	21	21
(Germany) F Hammes (Germany) J Zurwonne	10	18
2	(Malaysia) R Abdul Latif (Malaysia) V Mawan	21	21

Third round
(South Korea) Kim K-J (South Korea) Lee J-H	11	21	21
5/8	(Singapore) D Wong (Singapore) J Tang	21	13	15
(England) P Mills (England) C Adcock	17	14
2	(Malaysia) R Abdul Latif (Malaysia) V Mawan	21	21

Quarter finals
(South Korea) Kim K-J (South Korea) Lee J-H	21	23	21
2	(Malaysia) R Abdul Latif (Malaysia) V Mawan	14	25	17
