= 2013 Korea Open Super Series Premier Qualification =

== Men's Single ==
=== Key ===
1. PFQ = Promoted From Qualifiers
2. PFR = Promoted From Reserves

=== Seeds ===
1. (Finland) Ville Lang (PFQ)
2. (China) Gao Huan (PFQ)
3. (Thailand) Suppanyu Avihingsanon (PFQ)
4. (Hong Kong) Chan Yan Kit (PFQ)

=== Qualifying draw ===
==== First qualifier ====
First Round
PFR	(South Korea) Lee Dong-Keun	21	21
(South Korea) Hong Ji-Hoon	11	17
(Thailand) Pakkawat Vilailak	15	21	21
PFR	(South Korea) Ha Young-Woong	21	10	9

Qualifying Competition
PFR	(South Korea) Lee Dong-Keun	21	21
(Thailand) Pakkawat Vilailak	17	18

==== Second qualifier ====
First Round
PFR	(South Korea) Choi Young-woo	21	21
(Australia) Luke Chong	12	13
(South Korea) Park Sung-Min	21	19	13
(Thailand) Pisit Poodchalat	7	21	21

Qualifying Competition
PFR	(South Korea) Choi Young-woo	17	14
(Thailand) Pisit Poodchalat	21	21

==== Third qualifier ====
First Round
(China) Chen Yuekun	21	21
PFR	(South Korea) Yim Jong-woo	10	12
(Chinese Taipei) Hsieh Hsuan-Yi	21	21
PFR	(South Korea) Heo Kwang-hee	16	19

Qualifying Competition
(China) Chen Yuekun	21	21
(Chinese Taipei) Hsieh Hsuan-Yi	18	19

==== Fourth qualifier ====
First Round
(Russia) Ivan Sozonov	17	10
(Singapore) Ashton Chen Yong Zhao	21	21
(Israel) Misha Zilberman	21	14	21
PFR	(South Korea) Kim Min-Ki	16	21	17

Qualifying Competition
(Singapore) Ashton Chen Yong Zhao	21	21
(Israel) Misha Zilberman	6	14

== Women's Single ==
=== Seeds ===
1. (Scotland) Kirsty Gilmour (Not Qualified)
2. (Germany) Karin Schnaase (Not Qualified)
3. (Australia) Victoria Na (Not Qualified)
4. (Russia) Tatjana Bibik (Not Qualified)

=== Qualifying draw ===
==== First qualifier ====
First Round
1	(Scotland) Kirsty Gilmour
Bye
(South Korea) Lee Jang-mi	21	21
(Bulgaria) Dimitria Popstoikova	16	10

Qualifying Competition
1	(Scotland) Kirsty Gilmour	21	13	16
(South Korea) Lee Jang-mi	16	21	21

==== Second qualifier ====
First Round
4	(Russia) Tatjana Bibik	16	17
(South Korea) Jung Mi-jin	21	21
(Russia) Anastasia Chervyakova	12	14
(South Korea) Lee Min-ji	21	21

Qualifying Competition
(South Korea) Jung Mi-jin	9	18
(South Korea) Lee Min-ji	21	21

==== Third qualifier ====
First Round
(Chinese Taipei) Pai Yu-po	18	18
(South Korea) Kim Hyo-min	21	21
(South Korea) Choi Yoo-ri	21	21
3	(Australia) Victoria Na	8	9

Qualifying Competition
(South Korea) Kim Hyo-min	21	21
(South Korea) Choi Yoo-ri	12	11

==== Fourth qualifier ====
First Round
(Chinese Taipei) Hsu Ya-Ching	17	21	21
(South Korea) Lee Sun-min	21	8	18
(South Korea) Kim Soo-jin	11	21	9
2	(Germany) Karin Schnaase	21	19	21

Qualifying Competition
(Chinese Taipei) Hsu Ya-Ching	21	21
2	(Germany) Karin Schnaase	5	14

== Men's doubles ==
=== Seeds ===
1. (England) Robert Blair/ (Malaysia) Tan Bin Shen (Qualified)
2. (South Korea) Kang Ji-wook/Lee Sang-joon (Qualified)
3. (South Korea) Cho Gun-woo/Kim Dae-eun (Qualified)
4. (Malaysia) Chan Peng Soon/Ong Jian Guo (Not Qualified)

=== Qualifying draw ===
==== First qualifier ====
Qualifying Competition
1	(England) Robert Blair (Malaysia) Tan Bin Shen
	Bye

==== Second qualifier ====
Qualifying Competition
4	(Malaysia) Chan Peng Soon (Malaysia) Ong Jian Guo	13	17
	(South Korea) Kim Jae-hwan (South Korea) Kim Jung-ho	21	21

==== Third qualifier ====
Qualifying Competition
	(South Korea) Choi Sol-kyu (South Korea) Kim Ki-Hoon	7	12
3	(South Korea) Cho Gun-woo (South Korea) Kim Dae-eun	21	21

==== Fourth qualifier ====
Qualifying Competition
	(South Korea) Bae Kwon-young (South Korea) Han To-sung	8	13
2	(South Korea) Kang Ji-wook (South Korea) Lee Sang-joon	21	21

== Women's doubles ==
=== Key ===
1. PFQ = Promoted From Qualifiers
2. PFR = Promoted From Reserves

=== Seeds ===
1. (Chinese Taipei) Chieh Hung-shih/Chien Wu-fang (PFQ)
2. (South Korea) Chae Yoo-jung/Yang Ran-Sun (Qualified)

=== Qualifying draw ===
==== Second qualifier ====
Qualifying Competition
(South Korea) Han Ga-hee (South Korea) Kim Hye-rin
Bye

==== Third qualifier ====
Qualifying Competition
(South Korea) Kong Hee-yong (South Korea) Lee Boon	19	10
(South Korea) Kim Chan-mi (South Korea) Kim Ji-won	21	21

==== Fourth qualifier ====
Qualifying Competition
	Bye
2	(South Korea) Chae Yoo-jung (South Korea) Yang Ran-sun

== Mixed doubles ==
=== Seeds ===
1. (Indonesia) Praveen Jordan/Vita Marissa (Qualified)
2. (Malaysia) Tan Wee Kiong/Woon Khe Wei (Not Qualified)
3. (Japan) Hirokatsu Hashimoto/Miyuki Maeda (Qualified)
4. (South Korea) Kim Dae-eun/Ko A-ra (Qualified)

=== Qualifying draw ===
==== First qualifier ====
First Round
1	(Indonesia) Praveen Jordan (Indonesia) Vita Marissa
Bye
(Russia) Vladimir Ivanov (Russia) Anastasia Chervyakova	21	21
(South Korea) Kim Jung-Ho (South Korea) Kong Hee-yong	6	10

Qualifying Competition
1	(Indonesia) Praveen Jordan (Indonesia) Vita Marissa	21	19	21
(Russia) Vladimir Ivanov (Russia) Anastasia Chervyakova	11	21	9

==== Second qualifier ====
First Round
4	(South Korea) Kim Dae-eun (South Korea) Ko A-Ra	21	17	21
(South Korea) Bae Kwon-young (South Korea) Shin Seung-Chan	13	21	18
(Indonesia) Alvent Yulianto Chandra (Indonesia) Rizki Amelia Pradipta	21	21
(South Korea) Kim Jae-Hwan (South Korea) Lee Boon	17	7

Qualifying Competition
4	(South Korea) Kim Dae-eun (South Korea) Ko A-Ra	21	21
(Indonesia) Alvent Yulianto Chandra (Indonesia) Rizki Amelia Pradipta	18	14

==== Third qualifier ====
First Round
(Chinese Taipei) Tsai Chia-Hsin (Chinese Taipei) Hsieh Pei-Chen	17	21	21
(South Korea) Han To-sung (South Korea) Chae Yoo-jung	21	18	15
(South Korea) Choi Sol-Kyu (South Korea) Kim Hye-rin	21	13	5
3	(Japan) Hirokatsu Hashimoto (Japan) Miyuki Maeda	19	21	21

Qualifying Competition
(Chinese Taipei) Tsai Chia-Hsin (Chinese Taipei) Hsieh Pei-Chen	21	17	12
3	(Japan) Hirokatsu Hashimoto (Japan) Miyuki Maeda	16	21	21

==== Fourth qualifier ====
First Round
(South Korea) Lee Sang-joon (South Korea) Kim So-young	21	21
(Russia) Ivan Sozonov (Russia) Tatjana Bibik	18	18
(South Korea) Kim Ki-Hoon (South Korea) Han Ga-hee
2	(Malaysia) Tan Wee Kiong (Malaysia) Woon Khe Wei	WO

Qualifying Competition
(South Korea) Lee Sang-joon (South Korea) Kim So-young	21	21
(South Korea) Kim Ki-Hoon (South Korea) Han Ga-hee	3	9
