= Goh V Shem =

Malaysian badminton player

Goh V Shem 吴蔚昇
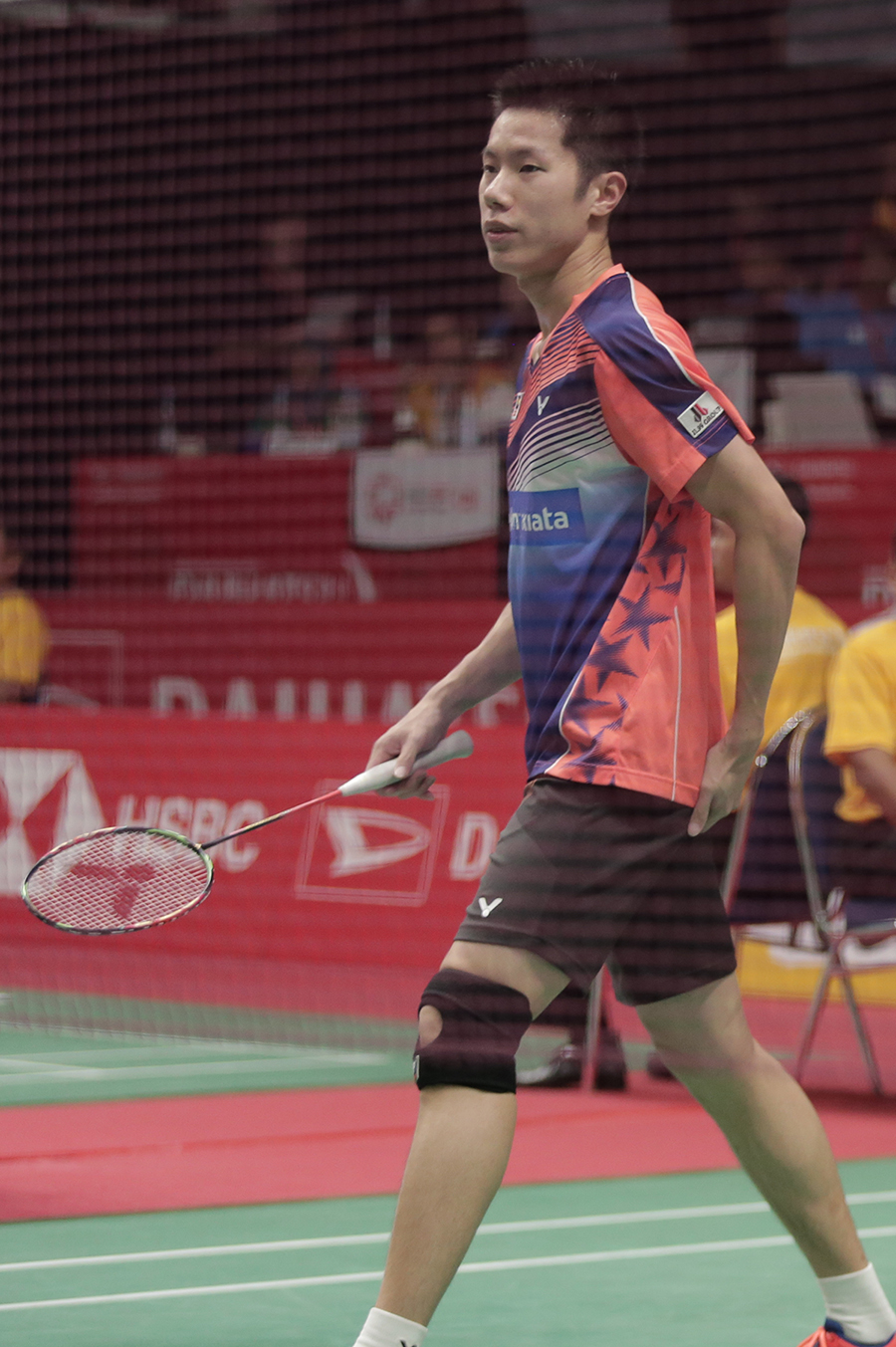
- Goh during the 2018 Indonesia Masters

Personal information
- Born: Goh Wei Shem; 20 May 1989 (age 37) Kuala Lumpur, Malaysia
- Years active: 2007–present
- Height: 1.79 m (5 ft 10 in)
- Weight: 70 kg (154 lb)

Sport
- Country: Malaysia
- Sport: Badminton
- Handedness: Right
- Coached by: Cheah Soon Kit

Men's doubles
- Tournaments played: 568 (350 wins–218 losses)
- Highest ranking: 1 (with Tan Wee Kiong, 7 November 2016); 35 (with Choi Sol-gyu, 17 February 2026)
- Current ranking: 46 (with Choi Sol-gyu, 27 October 2026)
- BWF profile
Medal record
Men's badminton
Representing Malaysia
Olympic Games
Silver medal – second place	2016 Rio de Janeiro	Men's doubles
Thomas Cup
Silver medal – second place	2014 New Delhi	Men's team
Bronze medal – third place	2016 Kunshan	Men's team
Commonwealth Games
Gold medal – first place	2014 Glasgow	Men's doubles
Gold medal – first place	2014 Glasgow	Mixed team
Silver medal – second place	2018 Gold Coast	Mixed team
Bronze medal – third place	2018 Gold Coast	Men's doubles
Asian Games
Bronze medal – third place	2014 Incheon	Men's team
Bronze medal – third place	2014 Incheon	Men's doubles
Asian Championships
Bronze medal – third place	2013 Taipei	Men's doubles
Asia Team Championships
Bronze medal – third place	2018 Alor Setar	Men's team
Southeast Asian Games
Silver medal – second place	2011 Jakarta–Palembang	Men's team
Bronze medal – third place	2011 Jakarta–Palembang	Men's doubles
Bronze medal – third place	2013 Naypyidaw	Men's doubles
Bronze medal – third place	2015 Singapore	Men's team
World Junior Championships
Bronze medal – third place	2007 Waitakere City	Boys' doubles

Goh V Shem
- Traditional Chinese: 吳蔚昇
- Simplified Chinese: 吴蔚昇
- Hanyu Pinyin: Wú Wèishēng
- Hokkien POJ: Gô͘ Ùiseng

Birth name
- Traditional Chinese: 吳偉申
- Simplified Chinese: 吴伟申
- Hanyu Pinyin: Wú Wĕishēn
- Hokkien POJ: Gô͘ Úisin

Goh V Shem (simplified Chinese: 吴蔚昇; traditional Chinese: 吳蔚昇; pinyin: Wú Wèishēng, born Goh Wei Shem on 20 May 1989) is a Malaysian badminton player. An Olympic silver medalist, two-time Commonwealth Games gold medalist, two-time Asian Games bronze medalist, Asian championship bronze medalist and former world number one, he and his former partner Tan Wee Kiong won the men's doubles silver medal at the 2016 Summer Olympics in Rio de Janeiro. Their Olympic silver was Malaysia's first in men's doubles since the 1996 Atlanta Olympics. They are the first and only Malaysian athletes in Olympic history to have held not just one, but two gold medal points, at 20–19 and 21–20 in the deciding game of the badminton men's doubles final at the 2016 Rio Olympics, placing them just one point away from winning the nation's first Olympic gold medal and making them the Malaysian athletes who have come closest to achieving the historic feat of becoming the first ever Olympic gold medalists of Malaysia, even closer than the legendary three-time Olympic silver medalist Lee Chong Wei, who won three Olympic silver medals but never reached a gold medal point. Together, they reached the world number one ranking on 7 November 2016, becoming the fifth Malaysian men's doubles pair to top the world rankings.

Goh won two gold medals at the 2014 Commonwealth Games, capturing the men's doubles title with Tan and contributing to Malaysia's gold medal in the mixed team event. He also won bronze medals in men's doubles and the men's team event at the 2014 Asian Games, as well as a bronze medal at the 2013 Badminton Asia Championships alongside Lim Khim Wah. At the 2018 Commonwealth Games, he won silver in the mixed team event and bronze in men's doubles with Tan. In team competitions, he was part of Malaysia's silver-medal-winning team at the 2014 Thomas Cup and bronze-medal-winning team at the 2016 Thomas Cup.

Together with Tan, Goh won the 2016 Denmark Open and 2016 Dubai World Superseries Finals, the latter marking their first year-end Superseries Finals title. They also won the 2015 U.S. Open, 2016 Syed Modi International, 2019 Thailand Masters and 2019 Chinese Taipei Open. Earlier in his career, he partnered Lim Khim Wah to win the 2014 Malaysia Open, a BWF Superseries Premier tournament, and the 2013 Malaysia Masters.

After ending his longstanding partnership with Tan in 2021, Goh continued his career as an independent professional player. In subsequent years, he competed with several partners, including Low Juan Shen, Boon Xin Yuan and South Korea's Choi Sol-gyu, with whom he reached a highest world ranking of number 35 on 17 February 2026.

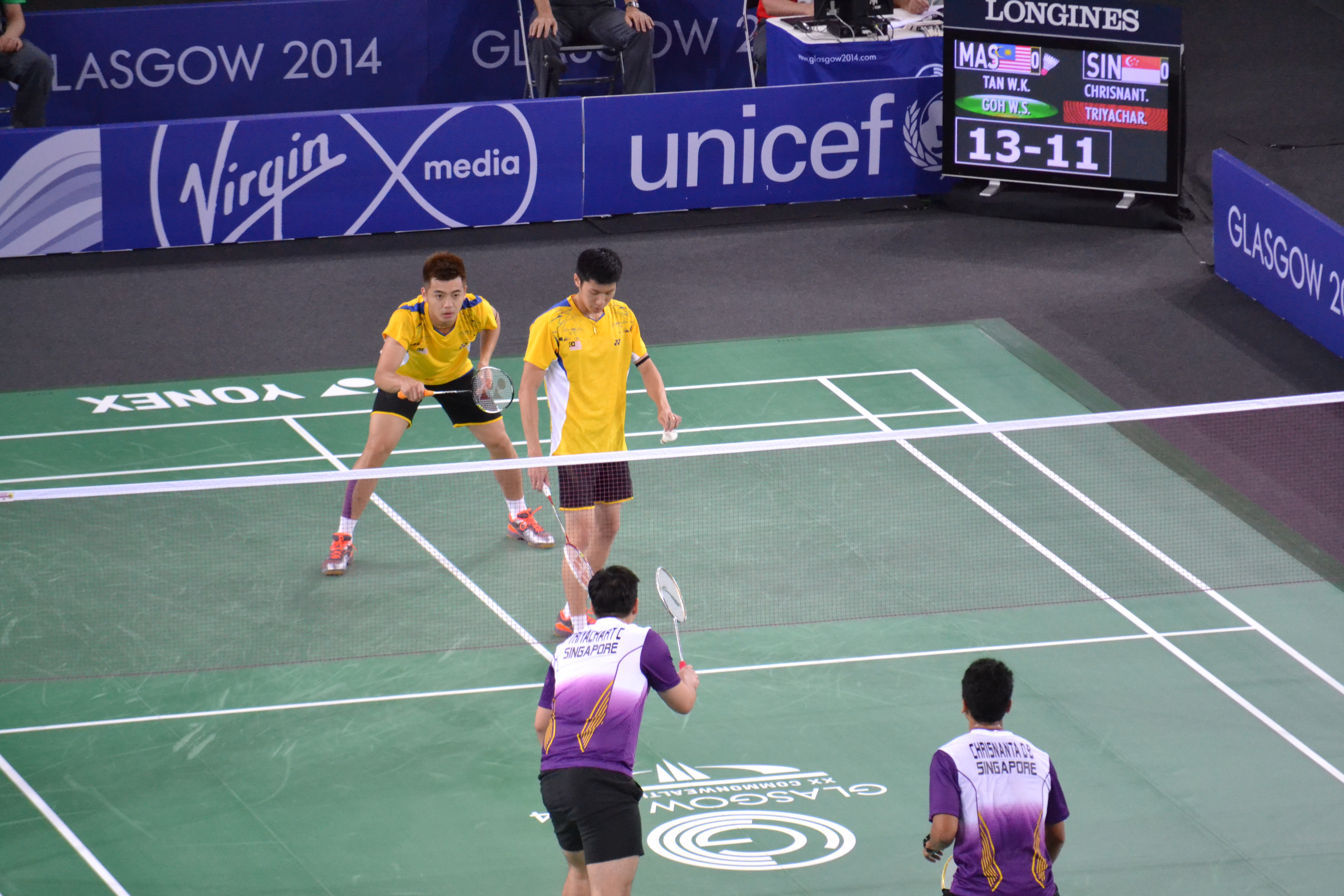
Commonwealth Games 2014 badminton double final

== Background ==
Goh was born in Kuala Lumpur. Later on for good luck he changed his Chinese birth name (吴伟申) to one with a different pronunciation (吴蔚昇), while also changing the spelling of his name in English from Wei Shem to V Shem. The V stands for 'Victory'.

== Career ==
Goh represented Malaysia at the 2007 BWF World Junior Championships with Ong Jian Guo where they took the bronze medal.

In 2011, Goh took the men's doubles bronze medal with Lim Khim Wah at the 2011 Southeast Asian Games. In late 2012, Goh was scratch partnered with Teo Ee Yi. They won the 2012 Malaysia International. Then for a brief period of time, Goh was once again partnered with Ong Jian Guo. They were semifinalists at the 2012 Korea Grand Prix Gold after being defeated by Ko Sung-hyun and Lee Yong-dae.

In 2013, Goh resumed his partnership with Lim. They became bronze medalists at the Asian Championships and won their first tournament together at the Malaysia Grand Prix Gold after defeating teammates and top seeds, Koo Kien Keat and Tan Boon Heong in the finals. They qualified for the World Championships but were defeated in the second round by compatriots, Hoon Thien How and Tan Wee Kiong. In mid 2013, Goh briefly partnered Teo Kok Siang. They won the bronze medal at the Southeast Asian Games but their partnership was cut short when Teo suffered an injury from a car accident.

=== 2014: Partnership with Tan Wee Kiong ===
Goh and Lim's partnership was once again resumed in 2014. They won their first Superseries tournament at the Malaysia Open after defeating China's Chai Biao and Hong Wei in the final. At the Malaysia Grand Prix Gold, they were runners-up after being defeated by Danny Bawa Chrisnanta and Chayut Triyachart of Singapore in the final. Goh played his last tournament with Lim at the 2014 BWF World Championships in September. During the second round match against Lee Sheng-mu and Tsai Chia-hsin of Chinese Taipei, Goh and Lim retired injured as Goh began suffering from backpains mid game.

In May 2014, Goh was scratch partnered with Tan Wee Kiong to play second men's doubles at the 2014 Thomas Cup. They won all four matches that they contested and defeated several highly ranked shuttlers along the way despite this being the first time that the two has played together internationally. Their debut partnership at the Thomas Cup was widely praised. Malaysia made it to the finals for the first time in 12 years but was narrowly defeated by Japan with a score of 2–3.

In August, they represented Malaysia at the 2014 Glasgow Commonwealth Games. They went on to take the gold medal and were the only medalists in the tournament who were not seeded. En route to the gold medal, they defeated top seeds, Chris Adcock and Andrew Ellis of England in the semifinals as well as 3rd seeds, Danny Bawa Chrisnanta and Chayut Triyachart of Singapore in the finals. They also won all five matches they contested in the mixed team event, helping Malaysia secure her third consecutive mixed team gold medal at the Commonwealth Games.

Following the World Championships in September, Goh and Tan had been officially partnered. They represented Malaysia at the 2014 Asian Games where they made it to semifinals but were once again defeated by top seeds, Lee Yong-dae and Yoo Yeon-seong of South Korea. The defeat automatically earned them the bronze medal as there is no bronze medal playoffs in badminton at the Asian Games. En route to the semifinals, they defeated 5th seeds, Lee Sheng-mu and Tsai Chia-hsin of Chinese Taipei in the first round and 3rd seeds, Hiroyuki Endo and Kenichi Hayakawa of Japan in the quarterfinals with a score of 21–16, 21–16.

=== 2015 ===
In January 2015, Goh and Tan were semifinalists at the Malaysia Masters. In March, they became runners-up to Cai Yun and Lu Kai of China at the Swiss Open with a score of 19–21, 21–14, 17–21. At the 2015 Sudirman Cup in May, Goh and Tan managed to upset the World No.1 pairing of Lee and Yoo in the first group tie against South Korea. They also defeated the pairing of Manu Attri and B. Sumeeth Reddy in the second group tie against India. Malaysia topped Group D and were drawn against South Korea once again in the quarterfinals but failed to advance. They were then runners-up at the Russian Open. At the 2015 BWF World Championships in August, Tan and Goh defeated defending champions Ko Sung-hyun and Shin Baek-cheol of South Korea in the second round but were defeated in the third round. In December, Goh and Tan won the U.S. Grand Prix.

=== 2016: Olympics silver ===
In 2016, Goh and Tan won their first title together at the Syed Modi International. They then became beaten semifinalists at the All England Open and the India Superseries. At the Thomas Cup, Goh won three out of his five matches played. Malaysia made it to the semifinals but lost to eventual winners Denmark.

Goh and Tan qualified for their first Olympics at the 2016 Summer Olympics in Rio de Janeiro, Brazil. They won all their matches in the group stage to top group B. They defeated 4th seeds Fu Haifeng and Zhang Nan in the group stage, top seeds Lee Yong-dae and Yoo Yeon-seong in the quarterfinals and 5th seeds Chai Biao and Hong Wei in the semifinals to once again face Fu and Zhang in the finals but this time falling short with a score of 21–16, 11–21, 21–23, taking home silver.

In October, Goh and Tan made it to the semifinals of the Korea Open. In the same year, they won their first Superseries tournament title as a pair at the Denmark Open. In December, Goh and Tan won the Dubai World Superseries Finals. Thus, they have now succeeded the achievements by their seniors, Koo Kien Keat and Tan Boon Heong, who were also among the best men's doubles pair in the long history of Malaysian badminton.

== Achievements ==
=== Olympic Games ===
Men's doubles
Year	Venue	Partner	Opponent	Score	Result
2016	Riocentro – Pavilion 4, Rio de Janeiro, Brazil	(Malaysia) Tan Wee Kiong	(China) Fu Haifeng (China) Zhang Nan	21–16, 11–21, 21–23	Silver

=== Commonwealth Games ===
Men's doubles
Year	Venue	Partner	Opponent	Score	Result
2014	Emirates Arena; Glasgow, Scotland	(Malaysia) Tan Wee Kiong	(Singapore) Danny Bawa Chrisnanta (Singapore) Chayut Triyachart	21–12, 12–21, 21–15	Gold
2018	Carrara Sports and Leisure Centre; Gold Coast, Australia	(Malaysia) Tan Wee Kiong	(Sri Lanka) Sachin Dias (Sri Lanka) Buwaneka Goonethilleka	21–8, 21–13	Bronze

=== Asian Games ===
Men's doubles
Year	Venue	Partner	Opponent	Score	Result
2014	Gyeyang Gymnasium; Incheon, South Korea	(Malaysia) Tan Wee Kiong	(South Korea) Lee Yong-dae (South Korea) Yoo Yeon-seong	6–21, 15–21	Bronze

=== Southeast Asian Games ===
Men's doubles
Year	Venue	Partner	Opponent	Score	Result
2011	Istora Gelora Bung Karno; Jakarta, Indonesia	(Malaysia) Lim Khim Wah	(Indonesia) Markis Kido (Indonesia) Hendra Setiawan	13–21, 21–17, 19–21	Bronze
2013	Wunna Theikdi Indoor Stadium; Naypyidaw, Myanmar	(Malaysia) Teo Kok Siang	(Indonesia) Berry Angriawan (Indonesia) Ricky Karanda Suwardi	17–21, 18–21	Bronze

=== Asian Championships ===
Men's doubles
Year	Venue	Partner	Opponent	Score	Result
2013	Taipei Arena; Taipei, Taiwan	(Malaysia) Lim Khim Wah	(South Korea) Ko Sung-hyun (South Korea) Lee Yong-dae	17–21, 16–21	Bronze

=== BWF World Junior Championships ===
Boys' doubles
Year	Venue	Partner	Opponent	Score	Result
2007	The Trusts Stadium; Waitakere City, New Zealand	(Malaysia) Ong Jian Guo	(China) Chai Biao (China) Li Tian	12–21, 16–21	Bronze

=== BWF World Tour (2 titles, 4 runners-up) ===
The BWF World Tour, which was announced on 19 March 2017 and implemented in 2018, is a series of elite badminton tournaments sanctioned by the Badminton World Federation (BWF). The BWF World Tours are divided into levels of World Tour Finals, Super 1000, Super 750, Super 500, Super 300 (part of the HSBC World Tour), and the BWF Tour Super 100.

Men's doubles
Year	Tournament	Level	Partner	Opponent	Score	Result
2018	Malaysia Masters	Super 500	(Malaysia) Tan Wee Kiong	(Indonesia) Fajar Alfian (Indonesia) Muhammad Rian Ardianto	21–14, 22–24, 13–21	(silver) Runner-up
2019	Thailand Masters	Super 300	(Malaysia) Tan Wee Kiong	(Chinese Taipei) Lu Ching-yao (Chinese Taipei) Yang Po-han	21–13, 21–17	(gold) Winner
2019	Chinese Taipei Open	Super 300	(Malaysia) Tan Wee Kiong	(South Korea) Choi Sol-gyu (South Korea) Seo Seung-jae	21–19, 15–21, 23–21	(gold) Winner
2019	Korea Masters	Super 300	(Malaysia) Tan Wee Kiong	(Chinese Taipei) Lee Yang (Chinese Taipei) Wang Chi-lin	19–21, 22–20, 19–21	(silver) Runner-up
2020 (I)	Thailand Open	Super 1000	(Malaysia) Tan Wee Kiong	(Chinese Taipei) Lee Yang (Chinese Taipei) Wang Chi-lin	16–21, 23–21, 19–21	(silver) Runner-up
2025 (II)	Indonesia Masters	Super 100	(South Korea) Choi Sol-gyu	(Indonesia) Raymond Indra (Indonesia) Nikolaus Joaquin	18–21, 21–17, 22–24	(silver) Runner-up

=== BWF Superseries (3 titles) ===
The BWF Superseries, which was launched on 14 December 2006 and implemented in 2007, was a series of elite badminton tournaments, sanctioned by the Badminton World Federation (BWF). BWF Superseries levels were Superseries and Superseries Premier. A season of Superseries consisted of twelve tournaments around the world that had been introduced since 2011. Successful players were invited to the Superseries Finals, which were held at the end of each year.

Men's doubles
Year	Tournament	Partner	Opponent	Score	Result
2014	Malaysia Open	(Malaysia) Lim Khim Wah	(China) Chai Biao (China) Hong Wei	21–19, 21–18	(gold) Winner
2016	Denmark Open	(Malaysia) Tan Wee Kiong	(Thailand) Bodin Isara (Thailand) Nipitphon Puangpuapech	14–21, 22–20, 21–19	(gold) Winner
2016	Dubai World Superseries Finals	(Malaysia) Tan Wee Kiong	(Japan) Takeshi Kamura (Japan) Keigo Sonoda	21–14, 21–19	(gold) Winner

BWF Super Series Finals tournament
BWF Super Series Premier tournament
BWF Super Series tournament

=== BWF Grand Prix (3 titles, 3 runners-up) ===
The BWF Grand Prix had two levels, the Grand Prix and Grand Prix Gold. It was a series of badminton tournaments sanctioned by the Badminton World Federation (BWF) and played between 2007 and 2017.

Men's doubles
Year	Tournament	Partner	Opponent	Score	Result
2013	Malaysia Grand Prix Gold	(Malaysia) Lim Khim Wah	(Malaysia) Koo Kien Keat (Malaysia) Tan Boon Heong	22–20, 21–15	(gold) Winner
2014	Malaysia Grand Prix Gold	(Malaysia) Lim Khim Wah	(Singapore) Danny Bawa Chrisnanta (Singapore) Chayut Triyachart	17–21, 20–22	(silver) Runner-up
2015	Swiss Open	(Malaysia) Tan Wee Kiong	(China) Cai Yun (China) Lu Kai	19–21, 21–14, 17–21	(silver) Runner-up
2015	Russian Open	(Malaysia) Tan Wee Kiong	(Russia) Vladimir Ivanov (Russia) Ivan Sozonov	20–22, 19–21	(silver) Runner-up
2015	U.S. Grand Prix	(Malaysia) Tan Wee Kiong	(Russia) Vladimir Ivanov (Russia) Ivan Sozonov	21–14, 21–17	(gold) Winner
2016	Syed Modi International	(Malaysia) Tan Wee Kiong	(India) Pranaav Jerry Chopra (India) Akshay Dewalkar	14–21, 24–22, 21–8	(gold) Winner

BWF Grand Prix Gold tournament
BWF Grand Prix tournament

=== BWF International Challenge/Series (4 titles) ===
Men's doubles
Year	Tournament	Partner	Opponent	Score	Result
2008	Malaysia International	(Malaysia) Lin Woon Fui	(Malaysia) Gan Teik Chai (Malaysia) Ong Jian Guo	21–19, 21–18	(gold) Winner
2010	Vietnam International	(Malaysia) Teo Kok Siang	(South Korea) Kim Ki-jung (South Korea) Shin Baek-cheol	21–23, 21–17, 21–19	(gold) Winner
2010	Malaysia International	(Malaysia) Lim Khim Wah	(Indonesia) Rahmat Adianto (Indonesia) Andrei Adistia	21–15, 21–16	(gold) Winner
2012	Malaysia International	(Malaysia) Teo Ee Yi	(Malaysia) Low Juan Shen (Malaysia) Tan Yip Jiun	21–15, 21–12	(gold) Winner

BWF International Challenge tournament
BWF Future Series tournament

== Honours ==
- Malaysia
  - Member of the Order of the Defender of the Realm (A.M.N.) (2017)
