= Shin Baek-cheol =

South Korean badminton player (born 1989)

Personal information
- Born: 19 October 1989 (age 37) Gimpo, Gyeonggi Province, South Korea
- Years active: 2007–2016, 2018–present
- Height: 1.85 m (6 ft 1 in)
- Weight: 72 kg (159 lb)

Sport
- Country: South Korea
- Sport: Badminton
- Handedness: Right

Men's & mixed doubles
- Highest ranking: 3 (MD 5 March 2015); 8 (XD 16 January 2014)
- Current ranking: 76 (MD with Ko Sung-hyun 29 November 2022)
- BWF profile
Medal record
Men's badminton
Representing South Korea
World Championships
Gold medal – first place	2014 Copenhagen	Men's doubles
Bronze medal – third place	2013 Guangzhou	Mixed doubles
Sudirman Cup
Silver medal – second place	2009 Guangzhou	Mixed team
Silver medal – second place	2013 Kuala Lumpur	Mixed team
Bronze medal – third place	2015 Dongguan	Mixed team
Thomas Cup
Bronze medal – third place	2016 Kunshan	Men's team
Asian Games
Gold medal – first place	2010 Guangzhou	Mixed doubles
Gold medal – first place	2014 Incheon	Men's team
Silver medal – second place	2010 Guangzhou	Men's team
Asian Championships
Gold medal – first place	2014 Gimcheon	Men's doubles
Silver medal – second place	2014 Gimcheon	Mixed doubles
Bronze medal – third place	2016 Wuhan	Mixed doubles
Asia Team Championships
Bronze medal – third place	2016 Hyderabad	Men's team
East Asian Games
Silver medal – second place	2009 Hong Kong	Men's team
Summer Universiade
Gold medal – first place	2011 Shenzhen	Mixed doubles
World Junior Championships
Gold medal – first place	2006 Incheon	Mixed team
Gold medal – first place	2007 Waitakere City	Boys' doubles
Silver medal – second place	2007 Waitakere City	Mixed team
Bronze medal – third place	2007 Waitakere City	Mixed doubles
Asian Junior Championships
Gold medal – first place	2005 Jakarta	Boys' team
Silver medal – second place	2007 Kuala Lumpur	Mixed doubles

Shin Baek-cheol (Korean: 신백철; born 19 October 1989) is a mixed and men's doubles badminton player from South Korea. He is a World, Asian and World Junior Champions, as well a gold medalists in the Asian Games and Summer Universiade.

== Career ==
Shin started to play badminton at the age of 8 in Wallgot Elementary School. He later belonged to the badminton team of the Korea National Sport University before moving to Gimcheon City Hall in 2012. In February 2009, Shin replaced Jung Jae-sung as Lee Yong-dae's partner. They won German Open after beating Japan's Kenichi Hayakawa and Kenta Kazuno. Shin and his mixed doubles partner, Yoo Hyun-young, reached the final of Swiss Open in March. They lost to second-seeded Lee Yong-dae and Lee Hyo-jung 14-21 and 18–21. He also won the gold medal at the 2010 Guangzhou Asian Games in the mixed doubles event partnered with Lee Hyo-jung.

In 2014 Copenhagen World Championships, He and his partner Ko Sung-hyun created one of the biggest upsets in badminton world championship final history with a victory over their compatriots, Lee Yong-dae and Yoo Yeon-seong 22–20, 21–23, 21–18.

In October 2016, BWF announced Shin Baek-cheol's retirement. Shin actually announced that he left the Korean national team before the Rio Olympic 2016, but he didn't confirm that he retired from badminton. After his retirement, Shin was no longer eligible to enter the BWF international ranking tournament until he turned 31 years of age, based on the regulations from the Badminton Korea Association. Shin and his partner Ko Sung-hyun then made an injunction to the Seoul high courts by rejecting the BKA regulations. In May 2018, Shin and Ko finally got a chance to compete in the international tournament, after won their one-year legal battle against BKA.

== Achievements ==
=== BWF World Championships ===
Men's doubles
Year	Venue	Partner	Opponent	Score	Result
2014	Ballerup Super Arena, Copenhagen, Denmark	(South Korea) Ko Sung-hyun	(South Korea) Lee Yong-dae (South Korea) Yoo Yeon-seong	22–20, 21–23, 21–18	Gold

Mixed doubles
Year	Venue	Partner	Opponent	Score	Result
2013	Tianhe Sports Center, Guangzhou, China	(South Korea) Eom Hye-won	(China) Xu Chen (China) Ma Jin	15–21, 17–21	Bronze

=== Asian Games ===
Mixed doubles
Year	Venue	Partner	Opponent	Score	Result
2010	Tianhe Gymnasium; Guangzhou, China	(South Korea) Lee Hyo-jung	(China) Zhang Nan (China) Zhao Yunlei	21–19, 21–14	Gold

=== Asian Championships ===
Men's doubles
Year	Venue	Partner	Opponent	Score	Result
2014	Gimcheon Indoor Stadium; Gimcheon, South Korea	(South Korea) Yoo Yeon-seong	(China) Li Junhui (China) Liu Yuchen	22–20, 21–17	Gold

Mixed doubles
Year	Venue	Partner	Opponent	Score	Result
2014	Gimcheon Indoor Stadium; Gimcheon, South Korea	(South Korea) Chang Ye-na	(Hong Kong) Lee Chun Hei (Hong Kong) Chau Hoi Wah	21–13, 15–21, 15–21	Silver
2016	Wuhan Sports Center Gymnasium; Wuhan, China	(South Korea) Chae Yoo-jung	(Indonesia) Tontowi Ahmad (Indonesia) Liliyana Natsir	16–21, 13–21	Bronze

=== Summer Universiade ===
Mixed doubles
Year	Venue	Partner	Opponent	Score	Result
2011	Gymnasium of SZIIT; Shenzhen, China	(South Korea) Eom Hye-won	(Chinese Taipei) Lee Sheng-mu (Chinese Taipei) Hsieh Pei-chen	15–21, 21–11, 21–19	Gold

=== BWF World Junior Championships ===
Boys' doubles
Year	Venue	Partner	Opponent	Score	Result
2007	The Trusts Stadium; Waitakere City, New Zealand	(South Korea) Chung Eui-seok	(China) Chai Biao (China) Li Tian	24–26, 21–19, 21–15	Gold

Mixed doubles
Year	Venue	Partner	Opponent	Score	Result
2007	The Trust Stadium; Waitakere City, New Zealand	(South Korea) Yoo Hyun-young	(England) Chris Adcock (England) Gabrielle White	20–22, 16–21	Bronze

=== Asian Junior Championships ===
Mixed doubles
Year	Venue	Partner	Opponent	Score	Result
2007	Stadium Juara; Kuala Lumpur, Malaysia	(South Korea) Yoo Hyun-young	(Malaysia) Tan Wee Kiong (Malaysia) Woon Khe Wei	18–21, 21–16, 12–21	Silver

=== BWF World Tour (4 titles, 2 runners-up) ===
The BWF World Tour, which was announced on 19 March 2017 and implemented in 2018, is a series of elite badminton tournaments sanctioned by the Badminton World Federation (BWF). The BWF World Tour is divided into levels of World Tour Finals, Super 1000, Super 750, Super 500, Super 300 (part of the HSBC World Tour), and the BWF Tour Super 100.

Men's doubles
Year	Tournament	Level	Partner	Opponent	Score	Result
2018	Vietnam Open	Super 100	(South Korea) Ko Sung-hyun	(Chinese Taipei) Lee Sheng-mu (Chinese Taipei) Yang Po-hsuan	22–20, 21–18	(gold) Winner
2018	Indonesia Masters	Super 100	(South Korea) Ko Sung-hyun	(Chinese Taipei) Chang Ko-chi (Chinese Taipei) Lu Chia-pin	21–23, 13–21	(silver) Runner-up
2018	Macau Open	Super 300	(South Korea) Ko Sung-hyun	(South Korea) Kim Gi-jung (South Korea) Lee Yong-dae	21–17, 13–21, 19–21	(silver) Runner-up
2019	Australian Open	Super 300	(South Korea) Ko Sung-hyun	(Japan) Takeshi Kamura (Japan) Keigo Sonoda	21–11, 21–17	(gold) Winner
2019	U.S. Open	Super 300	(South Korea) Ko Sung-hyun	(Chinese Taipei) Lee Yang (Chinese Taipei) Wang Chi-lin	21–13, 17–21, 6–3 retired	(gold) Winner
2021	French Open	Super 750	(South Korea) Ko Sung-hyun	(Indonesia) Marcus Fernaldi Gideon (Indonesia) Kevin Sanjaya Sukamuljo	21–17, 22–20	(gold) Winner

=== BWF Superseries (2 titles, 2 runners-up) ===
The BWF Superseries, which was launched on 14 December 2006 and implemented in 2007, was a series of elite badminton tournaments, sanctioned by the Badminton World Federation (BWF). BWF Superseries levels were Superseries and Superseries Premier. A season of Superseries consisted of twelve tournaments around the world that had been introduced since 2011. Successful players were invited to the Superseries Finals, which were held at the end of each year.

Men's doubles
Year	Tournament	Partner	Opponent	Score	Result
2012	Malaysia Open	(South Korea) Cho Gun-woo	(Chinese Taipei) Fang Chieh-min (Chinese Taipei) Lee Sheng-mu	21–16, 16–21, 16–21	(silver) Runner-up
2012	Denmark Open	(South Korea) Yoo Yeon-seong	(Malaysia) Koo Kien Keat (Malaysia) Tan Boon Heong	19–21, 21–11, 21–19	(gold) Winner
2015	Indonesia Open	(South Korea) Ko Sung-hyun	(China) Fu Haifeng (China) Zhang Nan	21–16, 16–21, 21–19	(gold) Winner

Mixed doubles
Year	Tournament	Partner	Opponent	Score	Result
2010	Swiss Open	(South Korea) Yoo Hyun-young	(South Korea) Lee Yong-dae (South Korea) Lee Hyo-jung	14–21, 18–21	(silver) Runner-up

BWF Super Series Finals tournament
BWF Super Series Premier tournament
BWF Super Series tournament

=== BWF Grand Prix (9 titles, 8 runners-up) ===
The BWF Grand Prix had two levels, the Grand Prix and Grand Prix Gold. It was a series of badminton tournaments sanctioned by the Badminton World Federation (BWF) and played between 2007 and 2017.

Men's doubles
Year	Tournament	Partner	Opponent	Score	Result
2009	German Open	(South Korea) Lee Yong-dae	(Japan) Kenichi Hayakawa (Japan) Kenta Kazuno	21–13, 21–16	(gold) Winner
2013	Thailand Open	(South Korea) Yoo Yeon-seong	(Russia) Vladimir Ivanov (Russia) Ivan Sozonov	18–21, 21–15, 21–14	(gold) Winner
2013	Korea Grand Prix Gold	(South Korea) Ko Sung-hyun	(South Korea) Kim Gi-jung (South Korea) Kim Sa-rang	15–21, 21–18, 23–25	(silver) Runner-up
2014	Korea Grand Prix	(South Korea) Ko Sung-hyun	(South Korea) Lee Yong-dae (South Korea) Yoo Yeon-seong	18–21, 19–21	(silver) Runner-up
2015	Korea Masters	(South Korea) Ko Sung-hyun	(South Korea) Kim Gi-jung (South Korea) Kim Sa-rang	21–16, 18–21, 19–21	(silver) Runner-up
2015	Macau Open	(South Korea) Ko Sung-hyun	(Indonesia) Berry Angriawan (Indonesia) Rian Agung Saputro	22–20, 21–14	(gold) Winner
2016	German Open	(South Korea) Ko Sung-hyun	(South Korea) Lee Yong-dae (South Korea) Yoo Yeon-seong	20–22, 21–18, 21–17	(gold) Winner
2016	New Zealand Open	(South Korea) Ko Sung-hyun	(Indonesia) Angga Pratama (Indonesia) Ricky Karanda Suwardi	21–18, 21–14	(gold) Winner

Mixed doubles
Year	Tournament	Partner	Opponent	Score	Result
2012	Korea Grand Prix Gold	(South Korea) Eom Hye-won	(South Korea) Yoo Yeon-seong (South Korea) Jang Ye-na	11–21, 21–18, 25–23	(gold) Winner
2013	German Open	(South Korea) Jang Ye-na	(Denmark) Anders Kristiansen (Denmark) Julie Houmann	21–19, 19–21, 24–22	(gold) Winner
2013	Australian Open	(South Korea) Jang Ye-na	(Indonesia) Irfan Fadhilah (Indonesia) Weni Anggraini	14–21, 24–22, 16–21	(silver) Runner-up
2013	Chinese Taipei Open	(South Korea) Jang Ye-na	(South Korea) Yoo Yeon-seong (South Korea) Eom Hye-won	22–20, 12–21, 21–16	(gold) Winner
2014	Korea Grand Prix	(South Korea) Chang Ye-na	(South Korea) Choi Sol-gyu (South Korea) Shin Seung-chan	Walkover	(silver) Runner-up
2015	Chinese Taipei Open	(South Korea) Chae Yoo-jung	(South Korea) Ko Sung-hyun (South Korea) Kim Ha-na	16–21, 18–21	(silver) Runner-up
2015	Korea Masters	(South Korea) Chae Yoo-jung	(South Korea) Ko Sung-hyun (South Korea) Kim Ha-na	21–19, 17–21, 19–21	(silver) Runner-up
2015	Macau Open	(South Korea) Chae Yoo-jung	(South Korea) Choi Sol-kyu (South Korea) Eom Hye-won	21–18, 21–13	(gold) Winner
2016	German Open	(South Korea) Chae Yoo-jung	(South Korea) Ko Sung-hyun (South Korea) Kim Ha-na	19–21, 12–21	(silver) Runner-up

BWF Grand Prix Gold tournament
BWF Grand Prix tournament

=== BWF International Challenge/Series (4 titles, 2 runners-up) ===
Men's doubles
Year	Tournament	Partner	Opponent	Score	Result
2010	Vietnam International	(South Korea) Kim Ki-jung	(Malaysia) Goh Wei Shem (Malaysia) Teo Kok Siang	23–21, 17–21, 19–21	(silver) Runner-up
2011	Turkey International	(South Korea) Cho Gun-woo	(South Korea) Kim Ki-jung (South Korea) Kim Sa-rang	17–21, 21–16, 15–21	(silver) Runner-up
2018	Malaysia International	(South Korea) Ko Sung-hyun	(Chinese Taipei) Lin Shang-kai (Chinese Taipei) Tseng Min-hao	21–18, 30–29	(gold) Winner
2019	Osaka International	(South Korea) Ko Sung-hyun	(South Korea) Kang Min-hyuk (South Korea) Kim Jae-hwan	21–13, 21–16	(gold) Winner

Mixed doubles
Year	Tournament	Partner	Opponent	Score	Result
2006	Malaysia Satellite	(South Korea) Kim Min-jung	(Indonesia) Tontowi Ahmad (Indonesia) Yulianti	21–16, 21–14	(gold) Winner
2007	Korea International	(South Korea) Yoo Hyun-young	(South Korea) Kim Sung-kwan (South Korea) Ham Hyo-jin	22–20, 21–3	(gold) Winner

BWF International Challenge tournament
BWF International Series tournament
