= Ong Jian Guo =

Malaysian badminton player (born 1989)

Ong Jian Guo 王健国
Personal information
- Born: 29 January 1989 (age 37) Malacca, Malaysia
- Height: 1.80 m (5 ft 11 in)

Sport
- Country: Malaysia
- Sport: Badminton
- Handedness: Right

Men's & mixed doubles
- Highest ranking: 37 (MD 13 April 2017); 20 (XD 2 May 2013)
- BWF profile
Medal record
Men's badminton
Representing Malaysia
Southeast Asian Games
Silver medal – second place	2011 Jakarta	Men's team
World Junior Championships
Bronze medal – third place	2007 Waitakere City	Boys' doubles

Ong Jian Guo

Chinese name
- Traditional Chinese: 王健國
- Simplified Chinese: 王健国
- Hanyu Pinyin: Wáng Jiànguó
- Jyutping: Wong4 Gin6 Gwok3
- Hokkien POJ: Ông Kiān-kok

Ong Jian Guo (born 29 January 1989 in Malacca) is a badminton player from Malaysia. Ong was selected to join the Malacca team in 2001, and two years later he moved to Kuala Lumpur to be educated at the Bukit Jalil Sports School. He was the bronze medalist at the 2007 World Junior Championships in the boys' doubles event, and helped the Malaysia men's team won the silver medal at the 2011 Southeast Asian Games in Jakarta, Indonesia.

Ong left national team in 2014, he became independent player pairing with Lim Khim Wah playing Men's double until 2016. He achieved highest world ranking of 37 in 2017. During this period, he was employed under Klang City Badminton Club ("KCBC") and became a coach of its academy for more than 500 students.

Since 2018, he joined Doublestar Sports in Singapore and has experience in coaching of players from juniors to adult. He leads players to participate Singapore local and international tournaments.

== Achievements ==
=== BWF World Junior Championships ===
Boys' doubles
Year	Venue	Partner	Opponent	Score	Result
2007	Waitakere City, New Zealand	(Malaysia) Goh Wei Shem	(China) Li Tian (China) Chai Biao	12–21, 16–21	Bronze

=== BWF International Challenge/Series ===
Men's doubles
Year	Tournament	Partner	Opponent	Score	Result
2008	Malaysia International	(Malaysia) Gan Teik Chai	(Malaysia) Goh Wei Shem (Malaysia) Lin Woon Fui	19–21, 18–21	(silver) Runner-up

Mixed doubles
Year	Tournament	Partner	Opponent	Score	Result
2012	Malaysia International	(Malaysia) Woon Khe Wei	(Indonesia) Lukhi Apri Nugroho (Indonesia) Annisa Saufika	21–11, 21–14	(gold) Winner

BWF International Challenge tournament
BWF International Series tournament
