= Gabby Adcock =

English badminton player

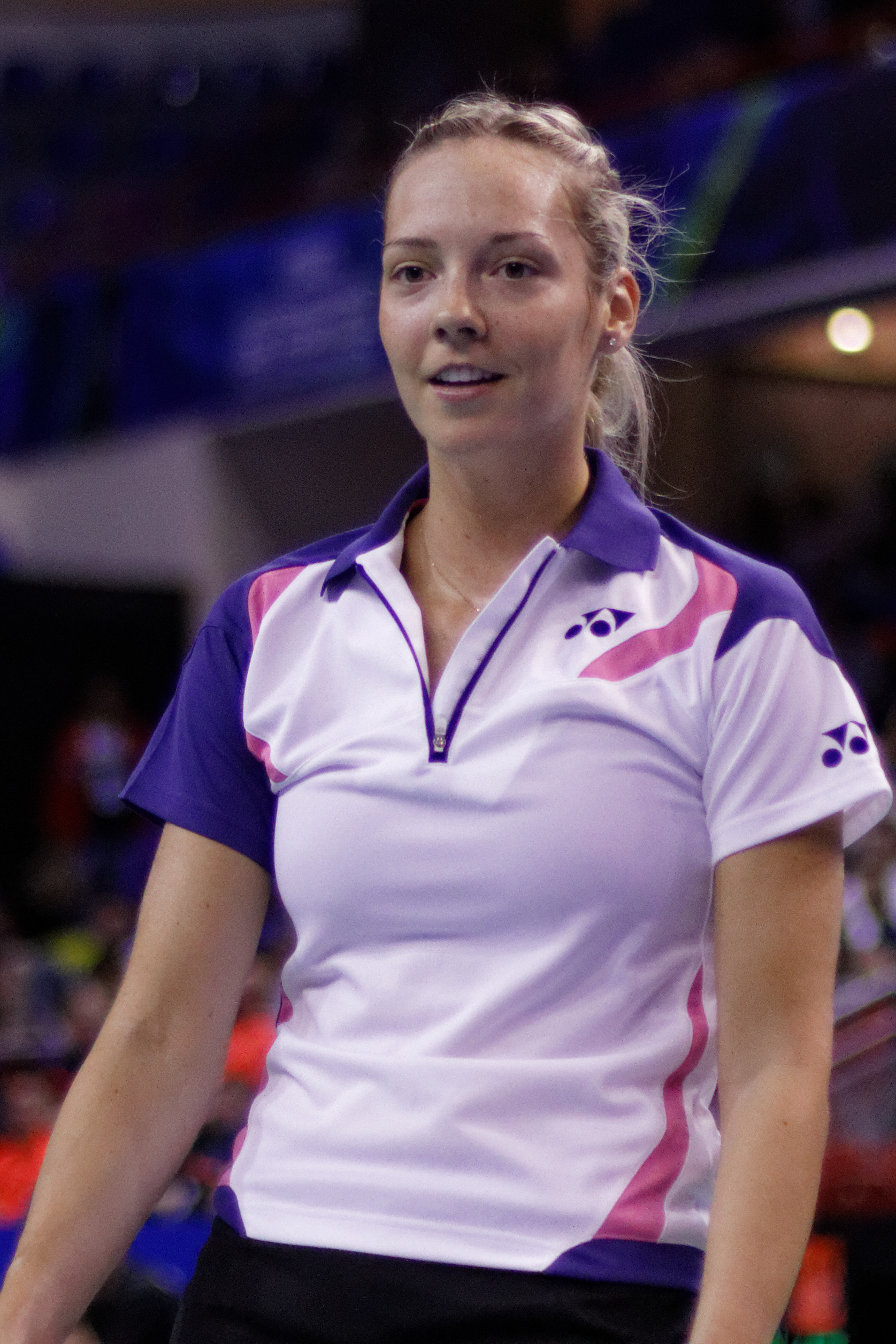
- Adcock at the 2013 French Super Series

Personal information
- Full name: Gabrielle Marie Adcock
- Born: Gabrielle Marie White; 30 September 1990 (age 36) Leeds, England
- Height: 1.67 m (5 ft 6 in)
- Weight: 60 kg (132 lb)
- Spouse: Chris Adcock (m. 2013)

Sport
- Country: England
- Sport: Badminton
- Handedness: Right
- Retired: 27 May 2021

Women's & mixed doubles
- Highest ranking: 16 (WD 8 July 2010); 4 (XD 24 August 2017)
- BWF profile
Medal record
Women's badminton
Representing Great Britain
European Games
Silver medal – second place	2019 Minsk	Mixed doubles
Representing England
World Championships
Bronze medal – third place	2017 Glasgow	Mixed doubles
Commonwealth Games
Gold medal – first place	2014 Glasgow	Mixed doubles
Gold medal – first place	2018 Gold Coast	Mixed doubles
Silver medal – second place	2014 Glasgow	Mixed team
Bronze medal – third place	2010 Delhi	Mixed team
Bronze medal – third place	2014 Glasgow	Women's doubles
Bronze medal – third place	2018 Gold Coast	Mixed team
European Championships
Gold medal – first place	2017 Kolding	Mixed doubles
Gold medal – first place	2018 Huelva	Mixed doubles
European Mixed Team Championships
Silver medal – second place	2015 Leuven	Mixed team
Bronze medal – third place	2013 Moscow	Mixed team
Bronze medal – third place	2017 Lubin	Mixed team
World Junior Championships
Silver medal – second place	2007 Waitakere	Mixed doubles
European Junior Championships
Gold medal – first place	2007 Völklingen	Mixed team
Bronze medal – third place	2007 Völklingen	Girls' doubles

Gabrielle Marie Adcock (née White; born 30 September 1990) is an English retired badminton player.

== Career ==
Gabby started playing badminton aged 10 in the badminton club at her school and became a full-time player straight from school at 16. She competes in badminton as a doubles specialist. In 2007, she won a bronze medal at the European Junior Badminton Championships in girls' doubles event partnered with Mariana Agathangelou. At the 2007 BWF World Junior Championships, she won a silver medal in mixed doubles event partnered with Chris Adcock. They were defeated by Lim Khim Wah and Ng Hui Lin of Malaysia in the finals round with the score 25–23, 20–22, and 19–21. Prior to the London Olympics she was paired with Robert Blair and Jenny Wallwork, though both pairs failed to qualify.

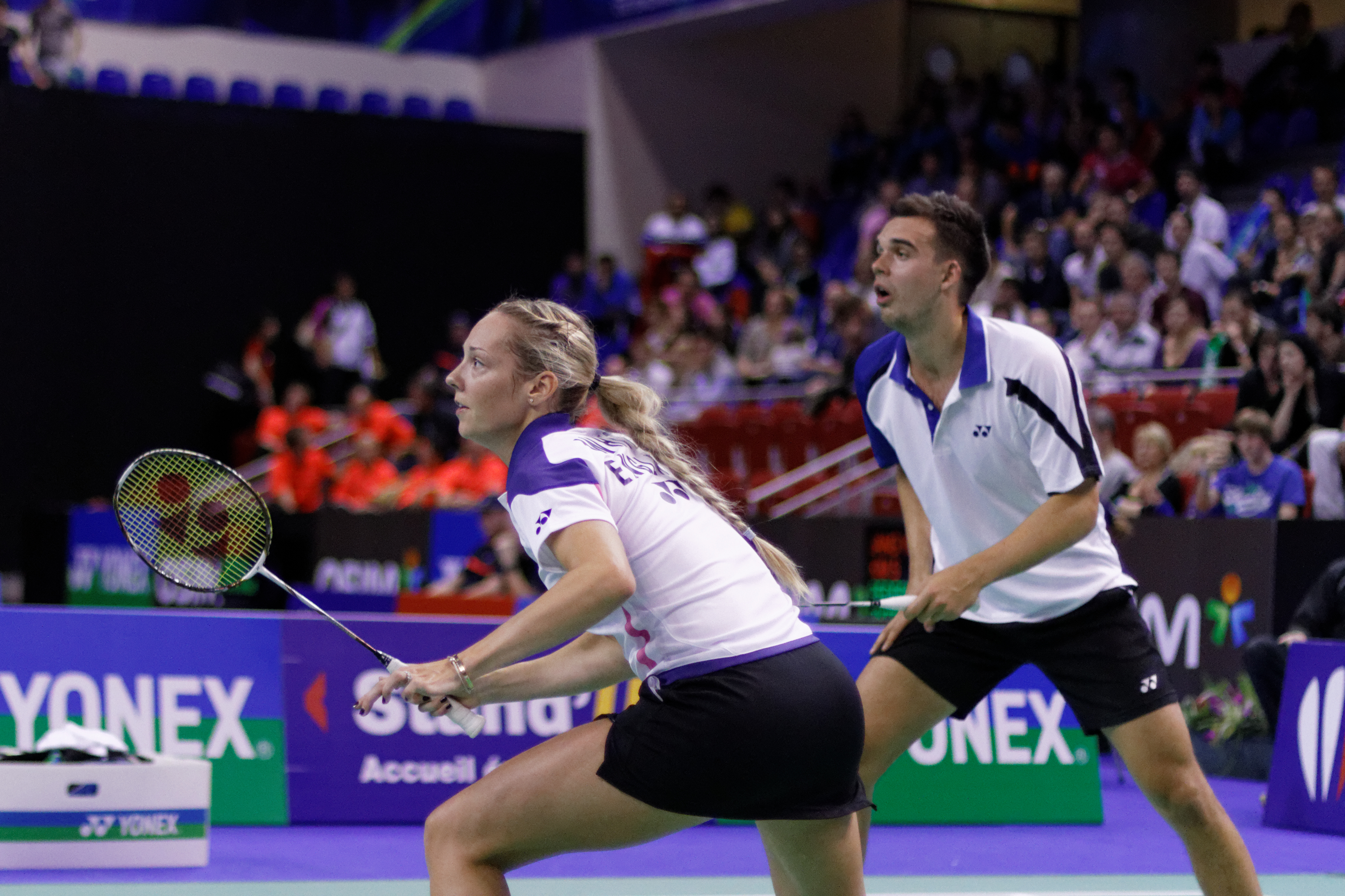
Gabby and her partner in mixed doubles Chris Adcock

She paired up with her husband Chris Adcock, whom she married in 2013, and won the 2013 Hong Kong Super Series against the world No.1 and Olympic Champion, Zhang Nan and Zhao Yunlei, 21–12, 21–16 in the semifinals round. They also won the 2014 Swiss Open Grand Prix Gold against Chai Biao and Tang Jinhua 21–17, 21–13. She competed in the 2014 Commonwealth Games, winning gold in the mixed doubles alongside her husband.

In 2015, she became the champion in mixed doubles at the 2015 BWF Super Series Masters Finals against Korean pair Ko Sung-hyun and Kim Ha-na. In 2016, she competed at the Summer Olympics in the mixed doubles event, but did not advance to the knockout stages.

In 2019, she qualified to represent Great Britain at the 2019 European Games and played in the mixed doubles with Chris Adcock. Competing as the top seeds, the duo advanced to the final, but was defeated by their compatriots Marcus Ellis and Lauren Smith in straight games 14–21, 9–21, and settled for a silver medal.

In January 2021, Adcock announced that she had tested positive for COVID-19 on 26 December 2020. As a result, she and Chris withdrew from the three tournaments scheduled to occur that month in Thailand: the Yonex Thailand Open, Toyota Thailand Open, and World Tour Finals. Badminton England reported her retirement on 27 May 2021. The 2020 Denmark Open was her last tournament.

== Achievements ==
=== BWF World Championships ===
Mixed doubles
Year	Venue	Partner	Opponent	Score	Result
2017	Emirates Arena; Glasgow, Scotland	(England) Chris Adcock	(China) Zheng Siwei (China) Chen Qingchen	15–21, 21–23	Bronze

=== Commonwealth Games ===
Women's doubles
Year	Venue	Partner	Opponent	Score	Result
2014	Emirates Arena; Glasgow, Scotland	(England) Lauren Smith	(Malaysia) Lim Yin Loo (Malaysia) Lai Pei Jing	16–21, 21–15, 21–16	Bronze

Mixed doubles
Year	Venue	Partner	Opponent	Score	Result
2014	Emirates Arena; Glasgow, Scotland	(England) Chris Adcock	(England) Chris Langridge (England) Heather Olver	21–9, 21–12	Gold
2018	Carrara Sports and Leisure Centre; Gold Coast, Australia	(England) Chris Adcock	(England) Marcus Ellis (England) Lauren Smith	19–21, 21–17, 21–16	Gold

=== European Games ===
Mixed doubles
Year	Venue	Partner	Opponent	Score	Result
2019	Falcon Club; Minsk, Belarus	(United Kingdom) Chris Adcock	(United Kingdom) Marcus Ellis (United Kingdom) Lauren Smith	14–21, 9–21	Silver

=== European Championships ===
Mixed doubles
Year	Venue	Partner	Opponent	Score	Result
2017	Sydbank Arena; Kolding, Denmark	(England) Chris Adcock	(Denmark) Joachim Fischer Nielsen (Denmark) Christinna Pedersen	21–17, 18–21, 21–19	Gold
2018	Palacio de los Deportes Carolina Marín; Huelva, Spain	(England) Chris Adcock	(Denmark) Mathias Christiansen (Denmark) Christinna Pedersen	21–18, 17–21, 21–18	Gold

=== BWF World Junior Championships ===
Mixed doubles
Year	Venue	Partner	Opponent	Score	Result
2007	Waitakere Trust Stadium; Waitakere City, New Zealand	(England) Chris Adcock	(Malaysia) Lim Khim Wah (Malaysia) Ng Hui Lin	25–23, 20–22, 19–21	Silver

=== European Junior Championships ===
Girls' doubles
Year	Venue	Partner	Opponent	Score	Result
2007	Hermann-Neuberger-Halle; Völklingen, Saarbrücken, Germany	(England) Mariana Agathangelou	(Belarus) Olga Konon (Czech Republic) Kristína Ludíková	20–22, 12–21	Bronze

=== BWF World Tour (3 runners-up) ===
The BWF World Tour, which was announced on 19 March 2017 and implemented in 2018, is a series of elite badminton tournaments sanctioned by the Badminton World Federation (BWF). The BWF World Tour is divided into levels of World Tour Finals, Super 1000, Super 750, Super 500, Super 300, and the BWF Tour Super 100.

Mixed doubles
Year	Tournament	Level	Partner	Opponent	Score	Result
2018	Thailand Open	Super 500	(England) Chris Adcock	(Indonesia) Hafiz Faizal (Indonesia) Gloria Emanuelle Widjaja	12–21, 12–21	(silver) Runner-up
2019	Dutch Open	Super 100	(England) Chris Adcock	(Netherlands) Robin Tabeling (Netherlands) Selena Piek	17–21, 13–21	(silver) Runner-up
2020	Denmark Open	Super 750	(England) Chris Adcock	(Germany) Mark Lamsfuß (Germany) Isabel Herttrich	21–18, 11–21, 14–21	(silver) Runner-up

=== BWF Superseries (2 titles, 2 runners-up) ===
The BWF Superseries, which was launched on 14 December 2006 and implemented in 2007, was a series of elite badminton tournaments, sanctioned by the Badminton World Federation (BWF). BWF Superseries levels were Superseries and Superseries Premier. A season of Superseries consisted of twelve tournaments around the world that had been introduced since 2011. Successful players were invited to the Superseries Finals, which were held at the end of each year.

Mixed doubles
Year	Tournament	Partner	Opponent	Score	Result
2013	Hong Kong Open	(England) Chris Adcock	(China) Liu Cheng (China) Bao Yixin	21–14, 24–22	(gold) Winner
2014	French Open	(England) Chris Adcock	(Indonesia) Tontowi Ahmad (Indonesia) Liliyana Natsir	9–21, 16–21	(silver) Runner-up
2015	Dubai World Superseries Finals	(England) Chris Adcock	(South Korea) Ko Sung-hyun (South Korea) Kim Ha-na	21–14, 21–17	(gold) Winner
2016	Dubai World Superseries Finals	(England) Chris Adcock	(China) Zheng Siwei (China) Chen Qingchen	12–21, 12–21	(silver) Runner-up

BWF Super Series Finals tournament
BWF Super Series Premier tournament
BWF Super Series tournament

=== BWF Grand Prix (2 titles, 4 runners-up) ===
The BWF Grand Prix had two levels, the Grand Prix and Grand Prix Gold. It was a series of badminton tournaments sanctioned by the Badminton World Federation (BWF) and played between 2007 and 2017.

Mixed doubles
Year	Tournament	Partner	Opponent	Score	Result
2011	German Open	(Scotland) Robert Blair	(Japan) Shintaro Ikeda (Japan) Reiko Shiota	16–21, 21–16, 21–15	(gold) Winner
2012	Dutch Open	(England) Marcus Ellis	(Denmark) Mads Pieler Kolding (Denmark) Kamilla Rytter Juhl	15–21, 13–21	(silver) Runner-up
2013	Bitburger Open	(England) Chris Adcock	(Germany) Michael Fuchs (Germany) Birgit Michels	19–21, 15–21	(silver) Runner-up
2014	Swiss Open	(England) Chris Adcock	(China) Chai Biao (China) Tang Jinhua	21–17, 21–13	(gold) Winner
2015	Bitburger Open	(England) Chris Adcock	(Poland) Robert Mateusiak (Poland) Nadieżda Zięba	18–21, 17–21	(silver) Runner-up
2016	Bitburger Open	(England) Chris Adcock	(China) Zheng Siwei (China) Chen Qingchen	16–21, 21–23	(silver) Runner-up

BWF Grand Prix Gold tournament
BWF Grand Prix tournament

=== BWF International Challenge/Series (8 titles, 6 runners-up) ===
Women's doubles
Year	Tournament	Partner	Opponent	Score	Result
2006	Slovak International	(England) Mariana Agathangelou	(England) Sarah Bok (England) Suzanne Rayappan	21–13, 14–21, 20–22	(silver) Runner-up
2007	Scottish International	(England) Mariana Agathangelou	(Russia) Valeria Sorokina (Russia) Nina Vislova	14–21, 14–21	(silver) Runner-up
2008	Portugal International	(England) Mariana Agathangelou	(China) Cai Jiani (China) Zhang Xi	17–21, 14–21	(silver) Runner-up
2010	Scottish International	(England) Jenny Wallwork	(England) Mariana Agathangelou (England) Heather Olver	21–17, 21–17	(gold) Winner
2012	Portugal International	(England) Alexandra Langley	(England) Helena Lewczynska (England) Hayley Rogers	21–11, 21–19	(gold) Winner
2012	Denmark International	(England) Lauren Smith	(Denmark) Line Damkjær Kruse (Denmark) Marie Røpke	18–21, 19–21	(silver) Runner-up
2012	Welsh International	(England) Lauren Smith	(Scotland) Jillie Cooper (Scotland) Kirsty Gilmour	21–7, 21–14	(gold) Winner

Mixed doubles
Year	Tournament	Partner	Opponent	Score	Result
2008	Portugal International	(England) Chris Adcock	(China) Zhang Yi (China) Cai Jiani	14–21, 11–21	(silver) Runner-up
2012	Portugal International	(England) Marcus Ellis	(Croatia) Zvonimir Đurkinjak (Croatia) Staša Poznanović	21–17, 15–21, 24–22	(gold) Winner
2012	Spanish Open	(England) Marcus Ellis	(France) Ronan Labar (France) Émilie Lefel	21–9, 21–13	(gold) Winner
2012	Belgian International	(England) Marcus Ellis	(England) Chris Langridge (England) Heather Olver	9–21, 21–10, 21–17	(gold) Winner
2012	Czech International	(England) Marcus Ellis	(England) Chris Langridge (England) Heather Olver	20–22, 7–6 retired	(silver) Runner-up
2012	Scottish International	(England) Marcus Ellis	(Netherlands) Ruud Bosch (Netherlands) Selena Piek	21–16, 21–16	(gold) Winner
2012	Welsh International	(England) Marcus Ellis	(England) Chris Langridge (England) Heather Olver	22–20, 21–16	(gold) Winner

BWF International Challenge tournament
BWF International Series tournament

== Record against selected opponents ==
Mixed doubles results with Chris Adcock against Super Series finalists, Worlds semi-finalists, and Olympic quarterfinalists.

- (China) He Hanbin & Yu Yang 0–1
- (China) Xu Chen & Ma Jin 0–2
- (China) Zhang Nan & Zhao Yunlei 1–12
- (China) Liu Cheng & Bao Yixin 5–3
- (China) Chai Biao & Tang Jinhua 1–0
- (Chinese Taipei) Chen Hung-ling & Cheng Wen-hsing 0–1
- (Denmark) Joachim Fischer Nielsen & Christinna Pedersen 2–5
- (England) Anthony Clark & Donna Kellogg 0–2
- (Germany) Michael Fuchs & Birgit Michels 3–1
- (Indonesia) Tontowi Ahmad & Liliyana Natsir 4–9
- (Indonesia) Riky Widianto & Richi Puspita Dili 1–0
- (Japan) Kenichi Hayakawa & Misaki Matsutomo 4–1
- (South Korea) Ko Sung-hyun & Kim Ha-na 1–3
- (South Korea) Lee Yong-dae & Lee Hyo-jung 0–2
- (South Korea) Yoo Yeon-seong & Jang Ye-na 1–0
- (Malaysia) Chan Peng Soon & Goh Liu Ying 2–2
- (Poland) Robert Mateusiak & Nadieżda Zięba 2–2
- (Thailand) Sudket Prapakamol & Saralee Thungthongkam 1–0
- (Thailand) Songphon Anugritayawon & Kunchala Voravichitchaikul 0–2
