= Wales national badminton team =

National badminton team

Wales
- Association: Badminton Wales (BW)
- Confederation: BE (Europe)
- President: Cath McCluskey

BWF ranking
- Current ranking: 102 ▼5 (2 January 2024)
- Highest ranking: 36 (7 January 2013)

Sudirman Cup
- Appearances: 8 (first in 1993)
- Best result: Group stage

European Mixed Team Championships
- Appearances: 21 (first in 1972)
- Best result: Quarter-finals (1984, 1986)

European Men's Team Championships
- Appearances: 6 (first in 2004)
- Best result: Quarter-finals (2008)

European Women's Team Championships
- Appearances: 6 (first in 2004)
- Best result: Group stage

Helvetia Cup
- Appearances: 14 (first in 1969)
- Best result: Runners-up (1983, 1985, 1987)

The Wales national badminton team (Welsh: Tîm badminton cenedlaethol Cymru) represents Wales in international badminton team competitions. It is controlled by Badminton Wales, the national organization for badminton in the country. Wales have never participated in the Thomas Cup and the Uber Cup. The team's last appearance in the international stage was at the 2007 Sudirman Cup.

The Welsh team had participated in the 2020 European Men's and Women's Team Badminton Championships but were defeated in the group stage.

== History ==
Badminton has been played in Wales since the early 1920s. Welsh players then competed in the All England Open Badminton Championships and the Welsh International Championships. In 1928, Badminton Wales (then called the Welsh Badminton Union) was formed. Wales was also one of the nine founder members of the Badminton World Federation.

The Welsh national team competed in their first ever international team event when its first few players were sent to qualify for the 1955 Thomas Cup.

Former national player Chris Rees was selected to be the performance coach of the Welsh national badminton team in 2020.

=== Men's team ===
The Welsh men's team first competed in the 1955 Thomas Cup qualifiers. The team failed to advance to the inter-zone elimination round after losing 9−0 to Denmark on home soil. The men's team returned to qualify for the 1984 Thomas Cup after a long hiatus. The team beat Finland and the Netherlands 4−1 but lost their chances of entering the second round after losing 4−1 to Sweden. In the qualifiers for the 1986 Thomas Cup, the team won against Finland and Norway but failed to advance further after losing to England.

In the 1990 Thomas Cup qualifiers, the Welsh team made history after they advanced to the semi-final stages for the first time, beating Bulgaria, Spain and Kenya in their group. They then lost to Sweden and Canada in the semi-final stages and failed to edge out against Austria.

The Welsh team competed in the inaugural edition of the European Men's Team Badminton Championships in 2006 but were halted in the group stage. They showed improvement two years later in the 2008 European Men's Team Badminton Championships by not only advancing to the quarter-finals but also topping the group for the very first time. The team were defeated by Germany in the quarter-finals.

=== Women's team ===
The Welsh women's team took part in qualifying for the 1986 Uber Cup. The team lost in the first round group stage to Germany, England and Ireland. In the 1996 Uber Cup qualifiers, the team entered the second round after beating Slovenia, Austria and Spain but lost in the second round group stage to Denmark, Scotland and India. The women's team entered the second round for the next few Uber Cup qualifiers but did not advance further.

The women's team also competed in the 2006 European Women's Team Badminton Championships. They failed to get past the group stages.

=== Mixed team ===
The Welsh mixed team first competed in the 1969 Helvetia Cup and finished in 5th place. In the 1970 Helvetia Cup, the Welsh team beat Norway in the third place tie. The team also competed in the inaugural edition of the European Mixed Team Badminton Championships in 1972 but were eliminated in the group stages. The team were eliminated in the quarter-finals of the 1974 European Mixed Team Championships.

The Welsh team made history by entering the 1983 Helvetia Cup. They lost the final to Germany. The team entered the Helvetia Cup finals two consecutive times in 1985 and 1987 but lost to the Netherlands and Germany respectively.

== Competitive record ==
=== Thomas Cup ===
Year	Round	Pos
1949	Did not enter	
1952	Did not enter	
1955	Did not qualify	
1958	Did not enter	
1961	Did not enter	
1964	Did not enter	
1967	Did not enter	
1970	Did not enter	
1973	Did not enter	
1976	Did not enter	
1979	Did not enter	
1982	Did not enter	
1984	Did not qualify	
1986	Did not qualify	
1988	Did not qualify	
1990	Did not qualify	
1992	Did not qualify	
1994	Did not qualify	
1996	Did not qualify	
1998	Did not qualify	
2000	Did not qualify	
2002	Did not qualify	
2004	Did not qualify	
2006	Did not qualify	
2008	Did not qualify	
2010	Did not qualify	
2012	Did not enter	
2014	Did not qualify	
2016	Did not enter	
2018	Did not enter	
2020	Did not qualify	
2022	Did not qualify	
2024	TBD	
2026	TBD	
2028	TBD	
2030	TBD	

=== Uber Cup ===
Year	Round	Pos
1957	Did not enter	
1960	Did not enter	
1963	Did not enter	
1966	Did not enter	
1969	Did not enter	
1972	Did not enter	
1975	Did not enter	
1978	Did not enter	
1981	Did not enter	
1984	Did not enter	
1986	Did not qualify	
1988	Did not qualify	
1990	Did not qualify	
1992	Did not qualify	
1994	Did not qualify	
1996	Did not qualify	
1998	Did not qualify	
2000	Did not qualify	
2002	Did not qualify	
2004	Did not qualify	
2006	Did not qualify	
2008	Did not qualify	
2010	Did not qualify	
2012	Did not enter	
2014	Did not qualify	
2016	Did not enter	
2018	Did not enter	
2020	Did not qualify	
2022	Did not qualify	
2024	TBD	
2026	TBD	
2028	TBD	
2030	TBD	

=== Sudirman Cup ===
Year	Round	Pos
1989	Did not enter	
1991	Did not enter	
1993	Group stage	29th
1995	Group stage	28th
1997	Group stage	26th
1999	Group stage	23rd
2001	Group stage	20th
2003	Group stage	19th
2005	Group stage	24th
2007	Group stage	30th
2009	Did not enter	
2011	Did not enter	
2013	Did not enter	
2015	Did not enter	
2017	Did not enter	
2019	Did not enter	
2021	Did not enter	
2023	Did not enter	
2025	TBD	
2027	TBD	
2029	TBD	

=== Commonwealth Games ===
==== Men's team ====
Year	Round	Pos
1998	Group stage	11th

==== Women's team ====
Year	Round	Pos
1998	Group stage	13th

==== Mixed team ====
Year	Round	Pos
1978	Group stage	9th
1982	Did not enter	
1986	Group stage	8th
1990	Did not enter	
1994	Group stage	8th
2002	Group stage	7th
2006	Did not enter	
2010	Group stage	10th
2014	Group stage	13th
2018	Did not enter	
2022	Did not enter	
2026	TBD	

=== European Team Championships ===
==== Men's team ====
Year	Round	Pos
2004	Group stage	17th
2006	Group stage	9th
2008	Quarter-finals	8th
2010	Group stage	20th
2012	Did not enter	
2014	Group stage	24th
2016	Withdrew	
2018	Did not enter	
2020	Group stage	29th
2024	Did not enter	
2026	TBD	
2028	TBD	
2030	TBD	

==== Women's team ====
Year	Round	Pos
2004	Group stage	10th
2006	Group stage	28th
2008	Group stage	26th
2010	Group stage	13th
2012	Did not enter	
2014	Group stage	15th
2016	Withdrew	
2018	Did not enter	
2020	Group stage	29th
2024	Did not enter	
2026	TBD	
2028	TBD	
2030	TBD	

==== Mixed team ====
Year	Round	Pos
1972	Group stage	10th
1974	Group stage	7th
1976	Group stage	9th
1978	Group stage	10th
1980	Group stage	9th
1982	Group stage	10th
1984	Quarter-finals	8th
1986	Quarter-finals	8th
1988	Group stage	9th
1990	Group stage	11th
1992	Group stage	11th
1994	Group stage	9th
1996	Group stage	10th
1998	Group stage	13th
2000	Group stage	11th
2002	Group stage	10th
2004	Group stage	11th
2006	Group stage	16th
2008	Did not enter	
2009	Group stage	28th
2011	Group stage	23rd
2013	Group stage	28th
2015	Did not enter	
2017	Did not enter	
2019	Did not enter	
2021	Did not qualify	
2023	Did not enter	
2025	TBD	
2027	TBD	
2029	TBD	

=== Helvetia Cup ===
Year	Round	Pos
1962	Did not enter	
1963	Did not enter	
1964	Did not enter	
1965	Did not enter	
1966	Did not enter	
1967	Did not enter	
1968	Did not enter	
1969	Fifth place	5th
1970	Third place	3rd
1971	Group stage	8th
1973	Group stage	8th
1975	Group stage	5th
1977	Group stage	6th
1979	Fourth place	4th
1981	Third place	3rd
1983	Runners-up	2nd
1985	Runners-up	2nd
1987	Runners-up	2nd
1989	Fourth place	4th
1991	Fourth place	4th
1993	Group stage	10th
1995	Did not enter	
1997	Did not enter	
1999	Did not enter	
2001	Did not enter	
2003	Did not enter	
2005	Did not enter	
2007	Did not enter	

**Red border color indicates tournament was held on home soil.

== Junior competitive record ==
=== Suhandinata Cup ===
Year	Round	Pos
2000	Did not enter	
2002	Did not enter	
2004	Did not enter	
2006	Did not enter	
2007	Did not enter	
2008	Did not enter	
2009	Did not enter	
2010	Did not enter	
2011	Did not enter	
2012	Did not enter	
2013	Did not enter	
2014	Did not enter	
2015	Did not enter	
2016	Did not enter	
2017	Did not enter	
2018	Did not enter	
2019	Did not enter	
2022	Did not enter	
2023	Did not enter	
2024	TBD	

=== Commonwealth Youth Games ===
==== Mixed team ====
Year	Round	Pos
2004	Did not enter	

=== European Junior Team Championships ===
==== Mixed team ====
Year	Round	Pos
1975	Group stage	11th
1977	Did not enter	
1979	Group stage	12th
1981	Group stage	7th
1983	Group stage	8th
1985	Group stage	8th
1987	Group stage	11th
1989	Group stage	12th
1991	Group stage	12th
1993	Group stage	9th
1995	Group stage	16th
1997	Did not qualify	
1999	Did not qualify	
2001	Did not qualify	
2003	Did not qualify	
2005	Did not qualify	
2007	Did not qualify	
2009	Group stage	18th
2011	Group stage	29th
2013	Group stage	21st
2015	Did not enter	
2017	Did not enter	
2018	Did not enter	
2020	Did not enter	
2022	Did not enter	
2024	TBD	

=== Finlandia Cup ===
==== Mixed team ====
Year	Round	Pos
1984	Fourth place	4th
1986	Group stage	9th
1988	Group stage	5th
1990	Group stage	5th
1992	Group stage	5th
1994	Did not enter	
1996	Group stage	7th
1998	Group stage	8th
2000	Group stage	10th
2002	Group stage	19th
2004	Group stage	8th
2006	Group stage	15th

**Red border color indicates tournament was held on home soil.

== Staff ==
The following list shows the coaching staff for the national badminton of Wales.

Name	Role
(Wales) Daniel Font	Head coach
(Wales) Luke Bailey	Support coach
(Wales) Chris Rees	Performance coach

== Players ==
=== Current squad ===
As of 2 January 2024

==== Men's team ====
Name	DoB/Age	Ranking of event		
Name	DoB/Age	MS	MD	XD
Andrew Oates	29 July 1999 (age 26)	-	941	478
Archie Bult	11 April 2003 (age 22)	988	-	-
Andrew Jones	11 October 1997 (age 28)	-	1229	-
Adam Stewart	18 March 1996 (age 30)	-	1229	-
Mebel Mano Kurian	1 January 2009 (age 17)	1217	1181	-
Jewel Mano Varughese	2 January 2006 (age 20)	1561	1181	-
Harper Leigh	1 September 2006 (age 19)	1195	-	-
Scott Oates	10 April 1998 (age 27)	-	941	-

==== Women's team ====
Name	DoB/Age	Ranking of event		
Name	DoB/Age	WS	WD	XD
Jordan Hart	26 January 1995 (age 31)	535	-	-
Jessica Ding	27 November 2003 (age 22)	1134	-	-
Learna Herkes	13 October 2003 (age 22)	-	-	-
Jasmine Owen	4 March 2004 (age 22)	-	-	-
Aimie Whiteman	23 May 2003 (age 22)	-	-	-
Saffron Morris	3 July 2007 (age 18)	373	336	478
Alice Palmer	26 February 1992 (age 34)	-	-	-
Katie Whiteman	13 October 2000 (age 25)	-	-	-

=== Previous squads ===
==== Sudirman Cup ====
- 2007

==== European Team Championships ====
- Men's team: 2006, 2008, 2010, 2014, 2020
- Women's team: 2006, 2008, 2010, 2014, 2020
- Mixed team: 2006, 2009, 2011, 2013
