= Slovakia national badminton team =

National badminton team representing Slovakia

Slovakia
- Association: Slovenský Zväz Bedmintonu (SZBe)
- Confederation: BE (Europe)
- President: Anton Siažik

BWF ranking
- Current ranking: 50 ▼1 (2 January 2024)
- Highest ranking: 24 (4 January 2018)

Sudirman Cup
- Appearances: 9 (first in 1995)
- Best result: Group stage

European Mixed Team Championships
- Appearances: 3 (first in 2004)
- Best result: Group stage

European Men's Team Championships
- Appearances: 8 (first in 2004)
- Best result: Group stage

European Women's Team Championships
- Appearances: 8 (first in 2004)
- Best result: Group stage

Helvetia Cup
- Appearances: 2 (first in 1995)
- Best result: 13th (2001)

The Slovakia national badminton team (Slovak: Slovenské národné bedmintonové mužstvo) represents Slovakia in international badminton team competitions. The Slovak team used to compete as part of Czechoslovakia. The national team was formed after the dissolution of Czechoslovakia in 1992 and after the formation of the Slovak Badminton Federation.

Slovakia competed in the Sudirman Cup until 2019. The national team competes in the European Men's and Women's Team Badminton Championships.

== Competitive record ==
=== Thomas Cup ===
Year	Round	Pos
1949	Part of Czechoslovakia	
1952	Part of Czechoslovakia	
1955	Part of Czechoslovakia	
1958	Part of Czechoslovakia	
1961	Part of Czechoslovakia	
1964	Part of Czechoslovakia	
1967	Part of Czechoslovakia	
1970	Part of Czechoslovakia	
1973	Part of Czechoslovakia	
1976	Part of Czechoslovakia	
1979	Part of Czechoslovakia	
1982	Part of Czechoslovakia	
1984	Part of Czechoslovakia	
1986	Part of Czechoslovakia	
1988	Part of Czechoslovakia	
1990	Part of Czechoslovakia	
1992	Part of Czechoslovakia	
1994	Did not qualify	
1996	Did not qualify	
1998	Did not qualify	
2000	Did not qualify	
2002	Did not enter	
2004	Did not qualify	
2006	Did not enter	
2008	Did not qualify	
2010	Did not qualify	
2012	Did not qualify	
2014	Did not qualify	
2016	Did not qualify	
2018	Did not qualify	
2020	Did not qualify	
2022	Did not qualify	
2024	Did not enter	
2026	Did not qualify	
2028	TBD	
2030	TBD	

=== Uber Cup ===
Year	Round	Pos
1957	Part of Czechoslovakia	
1960	Part of Czechoslovakia	
1963	Part of Czechoslovakia	
1966	Part of Czechoslovakia	
1969	Part of Czechoslovakia	
1972	Part of Czechoslovakia	
1975	Part of Czechoslovakia	
1978	Part of Czechoslovakia	
1981	Part of Czechoslovakia	
1984	Part of Czechoslovakia	
1986	Part of Czechoslovakia	
1988	Part of Czechoslovakia	
1990	Part of Czechoslovakia	
1992	Part of Czechoslovakia	
1994	Did not enter	
1996	Did not qualify	
1998	Did not qualify	
2000	Did not qualify	
2002	Did not enter	
2004	Did not qualify	
2006	Did not qualify	
2008	Did not qualify	
2010	Did not qualify	
2012	Did not qualify	
2014	Did not enter	
2016	Did not qualify	
2018	Did not qualify	
2020	Did not qualify	
2022	Did not qualify	
2024	Did not enter	
2026	Did not qualify	
2028	TBD	
2030	TBD	

=== Sudirman Cup ===
Year	Round	Pos
1989	Part of Czechoslovakia	
1991	Part of Czechoslovakia	
1993	Did not enter	
1995	Group stage	45th
1997	Group stage	49th
1999	Group stage	41st
2001	Group stage	42nd
2003	Group stage	37th
2005	Did not enter	
2007	Group stage	44th
2009	Did not enter	
2011	Group stage	28th
2013	Did not enter	
2015	Did not enter	
2017	Group stage	23rd
2019	Group stage	25th
2021	Did not enter	
2023	Did not enter	
2025	TBD	
2027	TBD	
2029	TBD	

=== European Team Championships ===
==== Men's team ====
Year	Round	Pos
2004	Group stage	22nd
2006	Did not enter	
2008	Group stage	
2010	Group stage	
2012	Group stage	
2014	Group stage	
2016	Group stage	
2018	Group stage	
2020	Group stage	
2024	Did not qualify	
2026	Did not qualify	
2028	To be determined	
2030	To be determined	

==== Women's team ====
Year	Round	Pos
2004	Group stage	25th
2006	Group stage	
2008	Group stage	
2010	Group stage	
2012	Group stage	
2014	Did not enter	
2016	Group stage	
2018	Group stage	
2020	Group stage	
2024	Did not qualify	
2026	Did not qualify	
2028	To be determined	
2030	To be determined	

==== Mixed team ====
Year	Round	Pos
1972	Part of Czechoslovakia	
1974	Part of Czechoslovakia	
1976	Part of Czechoslovakia	
1978	Part of Czechoslovakia	
1980	Part of Czechoslovakia	
1982	Part of Czechoslovakia	
1984	Part of Czechoslovakia	
1986	Part of Czechoslovakia	
1988	Part of Czechoslovakia	
1990	Part of Czechoslovakia	
1992	Part of Czechoslovakia	
1994	Did not enter	
1996	Did not qualify	
1998	Did not enter	
2000	Did not enter	
2002	Did not qualify	
2004	Did not enter	
2006	Did not enter	
2008	Did not enter	
2009	Group stage	
2011	Group stage	
2013	Group stage	
2015	Did not qualify	
2017	Did not qualify	
2019	Did not qualify	
2021	Did not qualify	
2023	Did not qualify	
2025	Did not qualify	
2027	TBD	
2029	TBD	

=== Helvetia Cup ===
Year	Round	Pos
1962	Part of Czechoslovakia	
1963	Part of Czechoslovakia	
1964	Part of Czechoslovakia	
1965	Part of Czechoslovakia	
1966	Part of Czechoslovakia	
1967	Part of Czechoslovakia	
1968	Part of Czechoslovakia	
1969	Part of Czechoslovakia	
1970	Part of Czechoslovakia	
1971	Part of Czechoslovakia	
1973	Part of Czechoslovakia	
1975	Part of Czechoslovakia	
1977	Part of Czechoslovakia	
1979	Part of Czechoslovakia	
1981	Part of Czechoslovakia	
1983	Part of Czechoslovakia	
1985	Part of Czechoslovakia	
1987	Part of Czechoslovakia	
1989	Part of Czechoslovakia	
1991	Part of Czechoslovakia	
1993	Did not enter	
1995	Group stage	14th
1997	Did not enter	
1999	Did not enter	
2001	Group stage	13th
2003	Did not enter	
2005	Did not enter	
2007	Did not enter	

=== FISU World University Games ===
==== Mixed team ====
Year	Round	Pos
2007	Did not enter	
2011	Did not enter	
2013	Did not enter	
2015	Did not enter	
2017	Did not enter	
2021	Did not enter	
2025	TBD	

=== World University Team Championships ===
==== Mixed team ====
Year	Round	Pos
2008	Did not enter	
2010	Did not enter	
2012	Did not enter	
2014	Did not enter	
2016	Group stage	
2018	Did not enter	

**Red border color indicates tournament was held on home soil.

== Junior competitive record ==
=== Suhandinata Cup ===
Year	Round	Pos
(China) 2000	Did not enter	
(South Africa) 2002	Did not enter	
(Canada) 2004	Did not enter	
(South Korea) 2006	Did not enter	
(New Zealand) 2007	Did not enter	
(India) 2008	Did not enter	
(Malaysia) 2009	Did not enter	
(Mexico) 2010	Did not enter	
(Taiwan) 2011	Did not enter	
(Japan) 2012	Did not enter	
(Thailand) 2013	Did not enter	
(Malaysia) 2014	Did not enter	
(Peru) 2015	Did not enter	
(Spain) 2016	Group stage	38th of 52
(Indonesia) 2017	Group stage	28th of 44
(Canada) 2018	Group stage	33rd of 39
(Russia) 2019	Group stage	22nd of 43
(New Zealand) 2020	Cancelled because of COVID-19 pandemic	
(China) 2021	Cancelled because of COVID-19 pandemic	
(Spain) 2022	Group stage	33rd of 37
(United States) 2023	Group stage	29th of 38
(China) 2024	Group stage	29th of 39
(India) 2025	Group stage	26th of 36
(Egypt) 2026	Group stage	21st of 47

=== European Junior Team Championships ===
==== Mixed team ====
Year	Round	Pos
1975	Part of Czechoslovakia	
1977	Part of Czechoslovakia	
1979	Part of Czechoslovakia	
1981	Part of Czechoslovakia	
1983	Part of Czechoslovakia	
1985	Part of Czechoslovakia	
1987	Part of Czechoslovakia	
1989	Part of Czechoslovakia	
1991	Part of Czechoslovakia	
1993	Did not enter	
1995	Did not qualify	
1997	Did not qualify	
1999	Group stage	13th
2001	Group stage	14th
2003	Did not qualify	
2005	Did not qualify	
2007	Did not qualify	
2009	Did not enter	
2011	Group stage	
2013	Group stage	
2015	Group stage	
2017	Group stage	
2018	Group stage	
2020	Did not enter	
2022	Group stage	
2024	Group stage	

=== Finlandia Cup ===
==== Mixed team ====
Year	Round	Pos
1984	Part of Czechoslovakia	
1986	Part of Czechoslovakia	
1988	Part of Czechoslovakia	
1990	Part of Czechoslovakia	
1992	Part of Czechoslovakia	
1994	Group stage	14th
1996	Group stage	11th
1998	Third place	3rd
2000	Did not enter	
2002	Group stage	13th
2004	Group stage	10th
2006	Group stage	11th

**Red border color indicates tournament was held on home soil.

== Players ==
=== Current squad ===
As of 16 December 2025

==== Men's team ====
Name	DoB/Age	Ranking of event		
Name	DoB/Age	MS	MD	XD
Milan Dratva	24 April 1996 (age 30)	174	1264	-
Andrej Suchý	2 February 2008 (age 18)	509	183	-
Simeon Suchý	19 February 2004 (age 22)	524	183	1135
Sebastian Kadlec	23 September 2004 (age 22)	882	-	402
Matúš Poláček	7 February 2006 (age 20)	840	277	-
Marián Lipták	6 December 1998 (age 27)	1064	1419	596
Richard Pavlik	18 February 2005 (age 21)	1049	277	-

==== Women's team ====
Name	DoB/Age	Ranking of event		
Name	DoB/Age	WS	WD	XD
Natália Slobodová	16 May 2004 (age 22)	258	1186	-
Olivia Kadlecová	23 September 2004 (age 22)	238	1196	402
Johanka Ivanovičová	8 December 2006 (age 19)	477	725	596
Katarína Vargová	13 April 1999 (age 27)	1124	725	-
Sofia Slosiariková	20 September 2004 (age 22)	564	-	-
Júlia Chmurovičová	26 January 2003 (age 23)	1060	543	1315
Michaela Telehaničová	31 March 2004 (age 22)	-	-	-
Natália Tomčová	27 May 2003 (age 23)	-	-	-
Lea Výbochová	16 October 2005 (age 21)	909	901	-

=== Previous squads ===
==== European Team Championships ====
- Men's team: 2020
- Women's team: 2020
