= East Germany national badminton team =

Former national badminton team representing East Germany

East Germany
- Association: Deutscher Federball-Verband (DFV)
- Confederation: BE (Europe)

European Mixed Team Championships
- Appearances: 1 (first in 1990)
- Best result: Group stage

Helvetia Cup
- Appearances: 1 (first in 1977)
- Best result: Third place (1977)

The East Germany national badminton team represented East Germany in international badminton team competitions. After the German reunification in October 1990, the East German badminton team merged with the national badminton of West Germany and the Deutscher Federball-Verband (also known as DDR-Badmintonverband) was merged with the German Badminton Association.

East Germany competed in the Helvetia Cup mixed team tournament once in 1977 and achieved third place. East Germany also won a bronze at the European Junior Badminton Championships in the women's singles event.

== Competitive record ==
The following tables show the Monaco national badminton team's competitive record in international tournaments.

Key

CH	RU	3rd	SF	4th	QF	#R	GS	Q#	#th	A	NH	WDN	DNQ

(CH) champion; (RU) runners-up; (3rd) third place; (SF) semi-finalists; (4th) fourth place; (QF) quarter-finalist; (#R) rounds 4, 3, 2, 1; (#th) places 5, 6...; (GS) group stage; (Q#) qualification round; (A) absent; (NH) not held; (WDN) withdrawn; (DNQ) did not qualify.

=== Thomas Cup ===
Year	1949	1952	1955	1958	1961	1964	1967	1970	1973	1976
Result	A						DNQ	A		
Year	1979	1982	1984	1986	1988	1990	1992	1994	1996	1998
Result	A						Reunified into Germany			

=== Uber Cup ===
Year	1950–1953			1957	1960	1963	1966	1969	1972	1975
Result	NH			A				DNQ	A	
Year	1978	1981	1984	1986	1988	1990	1992	1994	1996	1998
Result	A						Reunified into Germany			

=== Sudirman Cup ===
Year	1989	1991	1993	1995	1997	1999	2001	2003	2005	2007
Result	A	Reunified into Germany								

=== European Team Championships ===
==== Mixed team ====
Year	1972	1974	1976	1978	1980	1982	1984	1986	1988	1990
Result	A									GS

=== Helvetia Cup ===
Year	1962	1963	1964	1965	1966	1967	1968	1969	1970	1971
Result	A									
Year	1973	1975	1977	1979	1981	1983	1985	1987	1989	1991
Result	A		3rd	A						Reunified into Germany

**Red border color indicates tournament was held on home soil.

== Junior competitive record ==
=== European Junior Team Championships ===
==== Mixed team ====
Year	1975	1977	1979	1981	1983	1985	1987	1989	1991	1993
Result	A								Reunified into Germany	

=== Finlandia Cup ===
Year	1984	1986	1988	1990
Result	A			

**Red border color indicates tournament was held on home soil.

== Players ==
=== Squad ===
As of 1990

==== Men's team ====
Name	DoB/Age	Ranking of event		
Name	DoB/Age	MS	MD	XD
Thomas Mundt	20 March 1964 (aged 26)	-	-	-
Holger Wippich	14 May 1965 (aged 25)	-	-	-
André Wiechmann	7 January 1970 (aged 20)	-	-	-
Edgar Michalowski	30 January 1950 (aged 40)	-	-	-
Erfried Michalowsky	30 January 1950 (aged 40)	-	-	-

==== Women's team ====
Name	DoB/Age	Ranking of event		
Name	DoB/Age	WS	WD	XD
Monika Thiere	28 February 1953 (aged 37)	-	-	-
Petra Michalowsky	27 November 1962 (aged 27)	-	-	-
Angela Cassens	10 November 1951 (aged 38)	-	-	-
Birgit Kämmer	16 June 1962 (aged 28)	-	-	-
Ilona Michalowsky	4 July 1960 (aged 30)	-	-	-
