= Austria national badminton team =

National badminton team representing Austria

Austria
- Association: Österreichischer Badminton Verband (OBV)
- Confederation: BE (Europe)
- President: Wolfgang Noitz (elected 01 May 2025 - 30 April 2029)

BWF ranking
- Current ranking: 37 ▲7 (2 January 2024)
- Highest ranking: 23 (6 July 2017)

Sudirman Cup
- Appearances: 10 (first in 1989)
- Best result: Group stage

European Mixed Team Championships
- Appearances: 15 (first in 1972)
- Best result: Quarter-finals (1972)

European Men's Team Championships
- Appearances: 8 (first in 2004)
- Best result: Quarter-finals (2006)

European Women's Team Championships
- Appearances: 3 (first in 2004)
- Best result: Group stage

Helvetia Cup
- Appearances: 27 (first in 1962)
- Best result: Champions (1993)
- Website: https://www.badminton.at/

The Austria national badminton team (German: Österreichische badminton-nationalmannschaft) represents Austria in international badminton team competitions and is controlled by the Austrian Badminton Association (Austrian German: Österreichischer Badmintonverband). Austria participated in the Sudirman Cup from 1989 until 2017.

The men's team were quarterfinalists at the 2006 European Men's Team Badminton Championships. The Austrian team also competes in the Helvetia Cup.

== History ==
Badminton was first played in Austria in the year 1955. The national team was formed after the establishment of the Austrian Badminton Association in August 1957. The national association soon held its very first national championships to crown the best player to represent the national team in team events.

Austria made their first international team appearance when the mixed team competed at the 1962 Helvetia Cup. The team did well to achieve third place in their first time competing internationally.

=== Men's team ===
The Austrian men's team first competed in qualifying for the 1982 Thomas Cup. The team were humiliated on home soil after losing 9–0 against the Netherlands in Pressbaum. The team had better results two years later after beating Norway 3–2 in the 1984 Thomas Cup qualifiers. In 1996, the Austrian team advanced to the semifinal stages of the 1996 Thomas Cup qualifiers but failed to advance further after failing to top the group.

Austria then competed in the first European Men's Team Championships in 2006. The team topped their group in the group stages and advanced to the quarter-finals but lost 3–0 to their Dutch rivals. The men's team have failed to get past the group stage of the European Men's Team Championships since 2008.

=== Women's team ===
The women's team took part in qualifying for the 1984 Uber Cup. The team lost 5–0 to Scotland, but won 5–0 against Zambia and Switzerland to finish as group runner-up.

The team competed in the first two Europe Women's Team Badminton Championships in 2006 and 2008. They never got past the group stages.

=== Mixed team ===
The mixed team first competed in the 1962 Helvetia Cup and won against Belgium and Switzerland to finish third in the round robin tournament. The team went a step further the next year and finished as runners-up in the 1963 Helvetia Cup. Austria then went on to compete in the 1972 European Mixed Team Badminton Championships and were eliminated in the quarter-finals.

The team competed in the inaugural edition of the Sudirman Cup in 1989. The team were placed in Group 5 with New Zealand, Finland and the United States. The team lost all their matches against New Zealand and the United States but managed to win a match against Finland to finish in 22nd place. In 1990, the Austrian team strived and were crowned champions for the first time at the 1990 Helvetia Cup. In the 1993 Sudirman Cup, Austria shown improvement after topping their group and finishing in 19th place.

The Austrian team competed for the next few European Mixed Team Badminton Championships until 2011 and have never been able to get past the group stage. The team have failed to qualify for the Sudirman Cup since 2017.

== Competitive record ==
=== Thomas Cup ===
Year	Round	Pos
1949	Did not enter	
1952	Did not enter	
1955	Did not enter	
1958	Did not enter	
1961	Did not enter	
1964	Did not enter	
1967	Did not enter	
1970	Did not enter	
1973	Withdrew	
1976	Did not enter	
1979	Did not enter	
1982	Did not qualify	
1984	Did not qualify	
1986	Did not qualify	
1988	Did not qualify	
1990	Did not qualify	
1992	Did not qualify	
1994	Did not qualify	
1996	Did not qualify	
1998	Did not qualify	
2000	Did not qualify	
2002	Did not qualify	
2004	Did not qualify	
2006	Did not qualify	
2008	Did not qualify	
2010	Did not qualify	
2012	Did not qualify	
2014	Did not qualify	
2016	Did not qualify	
2018	Did not qualify	
2020	Did not qualify	
2022	Did not enter	
2024	Did not enter	
2026	Did not qualify	
2028	TBD	
2030	TBD	

=== Uber Cup ===
Year	Round	Pos
1957	Did not enter	
1960	Did not enter	
1963	Did not enter	
1966	Did not enter	
1969	Did not enter	
1972	Did not enter	
1975	Did not enter	
1978	Did not enter	
1981	Did not enter	
1984	Did not enter	
1986	Did not qualify	
1988	Did not qualify	
1990	Did not qualify	
1992	Did not qualify	
1994	Did not enter	
1996	Did not qualify	
1998	Did not qualify	
2000	Did not qualify	
2002	Did not qualify	
2004	Did not qualify	
2006	Did not qualify	
2008	Did not qualify	
2010	Did not enter	
2012	Did not enter	
2014	Did not enter	
2016	Did not enter	
2018	Did not enter	
2020	Did not enter	
2022	Did not enter	
2024	Did not enter	
2026	Did not enter	
2028	TBD	
2030	TBD	

=== Sudirman Cup ===
Year	Round	Pos
1989	Group stage	22nd
1991	Did not enter	
1993	Group stage	19th
1995	Group stage	18th
1997	Group stage	22nd
1999	Group stage	21st
2001	Group stage	21st
2003	Group stage	21st
2005	Did not enter	
2007	Did not enter	
2009	Did not enter	
2011	Did not enter	
2013	Group stage	20th
2015	Group stage	24th
2017	Group stage	20th
2019	Did not enter	
2021	Did not qualify	
2023	Did not qualify	
2025	TBD	
2027	TBD	
2029	TBD	

=== European Team Championships ===
==== Men's team ====
Year	Round	Pos
2004	Group stage	26th
2006	Quarter-finals	
2008	Group stage	
2010	Group stage	
2012	Group stage	
2014	Group stage	
2016	Group stage	
2018	Group stage	
2020	Group stage	
2024	Did not qualify	
2026	Did not qualify	
2028	To be determined	
2030	To be determined	

==== Women's team ====
Year	Round	Pos
2004	Group stage	18th
2006	Group stage	
2008	Group stage	
2010	Did not enter	
2012	Did not enter	
2014	Did not enter	
2016	Did not enter	
2018	Did not enter	
2020	Did not enter	
2024	Did not enter	
2026	Did not enter	
2028	TBD	
2030	TBD	

==== Mixed team ====
Year	Round	Pos
1972	Group stage	8th
1974	Group stage	12th
1976	Group stage	11th
1978	Group stage	11th
1980	Group stage	10th
1982	Group stage	11th
1984	Group stage	10th
1986	Group stage	10th
1988	Group stage	13th
1990	Group stage	14th
1992	Group stage	17th
1994	Group stage	12th
1996	Group stage	16th
1998	Did not qualify	
2000	Did not qualify	
2002	Did not qualify	
2004	Did not qualify	
2006	Did not qualify	
2008	Did not qualify	
2009	Group stage	
2011	Group stage	
2013	Did not enter	
2015	Did not qualify	
2017	Did not qualify	
2019	Did not qualify	
2021	Did not qualify	
2023	Did not qualify	
2025	Did not qualify	
2027	TBD	
2029	TBD	

=== Helvetia Cup ===
Year	Round	Pos
1962	Third place	3rd
1963	Runners-up	2nd
1964	Fourth place	4th
1965	Third place	3rd
1966	Third place	3rd
1967	Third place	3rd
1968	Fourth place	4th
1969	Third place	3rd
1970	Group stage	5th
1971	Fourth place	4th
1973	Third place	3rd
1975	Third place	3rd
1977	Group stage	7th
1979	Quarter-finals	6th
1981	Group stage	6th
1983	Fourth place	4th
1985	Group stage	8th
1987	Fourth place	4th
1989	Group stage	7th
1991	Third place	3rd
1993	Champions	1st
1995	Did not enter	
1997	Quarter-finals	6th
1999	Group stage	6th
2001	Group stage	9th
2003	Group stage	10th
2005	Group stage	10th
2007	Group stage	9th

=== Plume d'Or ===
Year	Round	Pos
1972	Did not enter	
1973	Did not enter	
1974	Did not enter	
1976	Did not enter	
1977	Did not enter	
1978	Did not enter	
1979	Did not enter	
1980	Did not enter	
1981	Did not enter	
1982	Champions	1st
1984	Champions	1st
1985	Champions	1st
1986	Champions	1st
1987	Third place	3rd
1988	Did not enter	
1989	Did not enter	
1990	Did not enter	
1991	Did not enter	
1992	Did not enter	
1993	Did not enter	
1994	Did not enter	

**Red border color indicates tournament was held on home soil.

== Junior competitive record ==
=== Suhandinata Cup ===
Year	Round	Pos
2000	Did not enter	
2002	Did not enter	
2004	Did not enter	
2006	Did not enter	
2007	Did not enter	
2008	Did not enter	
2009	Did not enter	
2010	Group stage	19th
2011	Did not enter	
2012	Did not enter	
2013	Did not enter	
2014	Did not enter	
2015	Did not enter	
2016	Did not enter	
2017	Did not enter	
2018	Group stage	28th
2019	Did not enter	
2022	Did not enter	
2023	Group stage	27th
2024	Did not enter	
2025	Did not enter	
2026	Group stage	43rd of 47

=== European Junior Team Championships ===
==== Mixed team ====
Year	Round	Pos
1975	Group stage	9th
1977	Group stage	9th
1979	Group stage	11th
1981	Group stage	12th
1983	Group stage	11th
1985	Group stage	10th
1987	Group stage	10th
1989	Group stage	10th
1991	Group stage	10th
1993	Group stage	13th
1995	Group stage	12th
1997	Group stage	14th
1999	Did not qualify	
2001	Did not qualify	
2003	Did not qualify	
2005	Did not qualify	
2007	Did not qualify	
2009	Group stage	
2011	Group stage	
2013	Group stage	
2015	Group stage	
2017	Group stage	
2018	Group stage	
2020	Did not enter	
2022	Group stage	
2024	Group stage	

=== Finlandia Cup ===
==== Mixed team ====
Year	Round	Pos
1984	Group stage	6th
1986	Group stage	8th
1988	Fourth place	4th
1990	Champions	1st
1992	Group stage	11th
1994	Did not enter	
1996	Did not enter	
1998	Fourth place	4th
2000	Group stage	8th
2002	Group stage	7th
2004	Fourth place	4th
2006	Group stage	6th

**Red border color indicates tournament was held on home soil.

== Staff ==
The following list shows the coaching staff of the Austrian badminton team.

Name	Role
(Denmark) Kent Madsen	Head coach
(Austria) Adi Pratama	Assistant coach

== Players ==
=== Current squad ===
As of 2 January 2024

==== Men's team ====
Name	DoB/Age	Ranking of event		
Name	DoB/Age	MS	MD	XD
Luka Wraber	7 September 1990 (aged 36)	122	-	-
Wolfgang Gnedt	28 May 1997 (aged 29)	194	922	-
Ilija Nicolussi	22 July 2005 (aged 21)	1735	941	1160
Philip Birker	8 May 1998 (aged 28)	-	345	100
Philipp Drexler	22 November 1999 (aged 26)	-	345	296
Christian Tomic	14 January 2004 (aged 22)	815	701	1284
Michael Schausberger	1 June 1997 (aged 29)	1199	701	1359
Collins Valentine Filimon	14 February 1998 (aged 28)	88	-	-

==== Women's team ====
Name	DoB/Age	Ranking of event		
Name	DoB/Age	WS	WD	XD
Chiara Rudolf	12 February 2006 (aged 20)	1209	758	1402
Katrin Neudolt	11 May 1989 (aged 37)	318	-	-
Anja Rumpold	30 October 2006 (aged 20)	1183	766	1160
Lena Krug	18 January 2005 (aged 21)	-	758	935
Serena Au Yeong	28 August 2000 (aged 26)	-	82	296
Katharina Hochmeir	21 June 1998 (aged 28)	-	82	100
Carina Meinke	14 July 1999 (aged 27)	-	-	-
Martina Nöst	17 March 1996 (aged 30)	-	-	1359
