= Norway national badminton team =

National badminton team representing Norway

Norway
- Association: Norges Badmintonforbund (NBF)
- Confederation: BE (Europe)
- President: Michael Fyrie-Dahl

BWF ranking
- Current ranking: 59 ▼7 (2 January 2024)
- Highest ranking: 47 (3 January 2023)

Sudirman Cup
- Appearances: 10 (first in 1989)
- Best result: Group stage

European Mixed Team Championships
- Appearances: 14 (first in 1974)
- Best result: Group stage

European Men's Team Championships
- Appearances: 7 (first in 2004)
- Best result: Group stage

European Women's Team Championships
- Appearances: 3 (first in 2004)
- Best result: Group stage

Helvetia Cup
- Appearances: 21 (first in 1965)
- Best result: Champions (1975)

The Norway national badminton team (Norwegian: Norges landslag i badminton) represents Norway in international badminton team competitions. It is controlled by the Norwegian Badminton Association. Norway participated in the Sudirman Cup until 2007. The national team have never qualified nor competed in the Thomas Cup and the Uber Cup.

Norway is also a medal contender in para-badminton. The nation has won a few gold medals at the BWF Para-Badminton World Championships, with most medals being won by para-badminton player Helle Sofie Sagøy.

== History ==
The national team was formed after the formation of the Norwegian Badminton Association on 24 October 1938. Unlike other Scandinavian countries Denmark, Sweden and Finland, the Norwegian team had average results in team events in the 20th century.

=== Men's team ===
The Norwegian men's team lost 9-0 twice to Sweden twice in the qualifiers for the 1961 and 1964 Thomas Cup. The men's team later failed to qualify for the 1967 Thomas Cup after losing 7-2 to Ireland. In 1978, Norway failed to qualify for the Thomas and Uber Cup again when the men's team lost against the Netherlands 6-3. In 1988, they finished as group runners-up for the 1990 Thomas Cup qualifiers, the team won against Mozambique and performed upsets against Ireland and Germany, but lost 4-1 the Netherlands.

Norway competed in the European Men's and Women's Team Badminton Championships in 2006. They beat Greece to finish 3rd in their group and were eliminated in the group stage.

=== Women's team ===
In 1978, the women's team lost 5-2 against Scotland in the 1978 Uber Cup qualifiers. In 1986, Norway finished 3rd on their group tie for the 1986 Uber Cup qualifiers after beating France and Iceland 4-1 and 5-0 respectively. In 1994, Norway were close to qualifying for the Uber Cup finals. The team topped the group but were eliminated in the semi-finals stage group tie, losing 0-5 to Denmark, 5-0 to Germany and 4-1 to Poland.

The women's team competed in the European Men's and Women's Team Badminton Championships in 2018. The team finished at the bottom of their group.

=== Mixed team ===
Norway first competed for the Helvetia Cup in 1965. In 1968, the national team finished as runners-up, losing against Germany. The team achieved runner-up position for a second time in 1973 after losing to the Czech Republic. In 1975, Norway made history by defeating the Yugoslavian team in the final, winning their first Helvetia Cup title. The team finished in third place in 1979 and as runners-up again in 1981.

In 1989, Norway debuted in the inaugural version of the Sudirman Cup. The team were placed in classification Group 6 with Sri Lanka and Nepal. They won 4-1 against Sri Lanka and 5-0 against Nepal to claim 23rd place on the overall rankings.

== Competitive record ==
The following tables show the Norway national badminton team's competitive record in international tournaments.

Key

CH	RU	3rd	SF	4th	QF	#R	GS	Q#	#th	A	NH	WDN	DNQ

(CH) champion; (RU) runners-up; (3rd) third place; (SF) semi-finalists; (4th) fourth place; (QF) quarter-finalist; (#R) rounds 4, 3, 2, 1; (#th) places 5, 6...; (GS) group stage; (Q#) qualification round; (A) absent; (NH) not held; (WDN) withdrawn; (DNQ) did not qualify.

=== Thomas Cup ===
Year	1949	1952	1955	1958	1961	1964	1967	1970	1973	1976
Result	A				DNQ				A	
Year	1979	1982	1984	1986	1988	1990	1992	1994	1996	1998
Result	DNQ	A	DNQ							
Year	2000	2002	2004	2006	2008	2010	2012	2014	2016	2018
Result	DNQ					A		DNQ		
Year	2020	2022	2024	2026	2028	2030	2032	2034	2036	2038
Result	DNQ	A		DNQ	TBD					

=== Uber Cup ===
Year	1950–1953			1957	1960	1963	1966	1969	1972	1975
Result	NH			A						
Year	1978	1981	1984	1986	1988	1990	1992	1994	1996	1998
Result	DNQ	A		DNQ			A	DNQ	A	DNQ
Year	2000	2002	2004	2006	2008	2010	2012	2014	2016	2018
Result	DNQ			A						DNQ
Year	2020	2022	2024	2026	2028	2030	2032	2034	2036	2038
Result	DNQ	A			TBD					

=== Sudirman Cup ===
Year	1989	1991	1993	1995	1997	1999	2001	2003	2005	2007
Result	GS	GS	GS	GS	GS	GS	GS	GS	GS	GS
Year	2009	2011	2013	2015	2017	2019	2021	2023	2025	2027
Result	A									TBD

=== European Team Championships ===
==== Men's team ====
Year	2006	2008	2010	2012	2014	2016	2018	2020	2024	2026
Result	GS	GS	A		GS	GS	GS	GS	DNQ	DNQ
Year	2028	2030	2032	2034	2036	2038	2040	2042	2044	2046
Result	TBD									

==== Women's team ====
Year	2006	2008	2010	2012	2014	2016	2018	2020	2024	2026
Result	A						GS	GS	DNQ	A
Year	2028	2030	2032	2034	2036	2038	2040	2042	2044	2046
Result	TBD									

==== Mixed team ====
Year	1972	1974	1976	1978	1980	1982	1984	1986	1988	1990
Result	A	GS	GS	GS	GS	GS	GS	GS	GS	GS
Year	1992	1994	1996	1998	2000	2002	2004	2006	2008	2009
Result	GS	GS	GS	A						GS
Year	2011	2013	2015	2017	2019	2021	2023	2025	2027	2029
Result	A	GS	DNQ						TBD	

=== Helvetia Cup ===
Year	1962	1963	1964	1965	1966	1967	1968	1969	1970	1971
Result	A			GS	GS	GS	RU	GS	4th	GS
Year	1973	1975	1977	1979	1981	1983	1985	1987	1989	1991
Result	RU	CH	GS	3rd	RU	GS	GS	GS	GS	A
Year	1993	1995	1997	1999	2001	2003	2005	2007	2009	2011
Result	A		GS	A	GS	GS	GS	GS	NH	

**Red border color indicates tournament was held on home soil.

== Junior competitive record ==
=== Suhandinata Cup ===
Year	Round	Pos
(China) 2000	Did not enter	
(South Africa) 2002	Did not enter	
(Canada) 2004	Did not enter	
(South Korea) 2006	Did not enter	
(New Zealand) 2007	Did not enter	
(India) 2008	Did not enter	
(Malaysia) 2009	Did not enter	
(Mexico) 2010	Did not enter	
(Taiwan) 2011	Did not enter	
(Japan) 2012	Did not enter	
(Thailand) 2013	Did not enter	
(Malaysia) 2014	Did not enter	
(Peru) 2015	Did not enter	
(Spain) 2016	Group stage	42nd of 52
(Indonesia) 2017	Group stage	30th of 44
(Canada) 2018	Group stage	27th of 39
(Russia) 2019	Group stage	33rd of 43
(New Zealand) 2020	Cancelled because of COVID-19 pandemic	
(China) 2021	Cancelled because of COVID-19 pandemic	
(Spain) 2022	Group stage	34th of 37
(United States) 2023	Group stage	33rd of 38
(China) 2024	Group stage	27th of 39
(India) 2025	Group stage	34th of 36

=== European Junior Team Championships ===
==== Mixed team ====
Year	1975	1977	1979	1981	1983	1985	1987	1989	1991	1993
Result	GS	GS	GS	GS	GS	GS	GS	GS	GS	GS
Year	1995	1997	1999	2001	2003	2005	2007	2009	2011	2013
Result	GS	GS	A					GS	GS	WDN
Year	2015	2017	2018	2020	2022	2024	2026	2028	2029	2030
Result	GS	GS	GS	A	GS	GS	TBD			

=== Finlandia Cup ===
Year	1984	1986	1988	1990	1992	1994	1996	1998	2000	2002	2004	2006
Result	CH	GS	3rd	GS	RU	A		GS	GS	GS	GS	A

**Red border color indicates tournament was held on home soil.

== Players ==
=== Current squad ===
As of 2 January 2024

==== Men's team ====
Name	DoB/Age	Ranking of event		
Name	DoB/Age	MS	MD	XD
Markus Barth	16 June 2000 (age 25)	102	316	-
Torjus Flåtten	25 June 1997 (age 28)	1826	97	1021
Vegard Rikheim	28 September 1997 (age 28)	1557	97	-
Fredrik Kristensen	26 July 1995 (age 30)	-	-	208
Danila Gataullin	4 June 2002 (age 23)	485	529	-
Jonas Østhassel	2 October 2001 (age 24)	-	529	304
Sander Østhassel	23 May 2005 (age 20)	-	717	-
Filip Bøhn	4 September 2005 (age 20)	1444	717	-
Thomas Barth	12 January 2004 (age 22)	1202	-	-

==== Women's team ====
Name	DoB/Age	Ranking of event		
Name	DoB/Age	WS	WD	XD
Marie Christensen	20 January 2000 (age 26)	-	158	567
Aimee Hong	5 July 2000 (age 25)	-	158	208
Marie Mørk	4 November 2001 (age 24)	544	416	1160
Julie Abusdal	21 March 2003 (age 22)	-	416	304
Emilie Hamang	4 February 1998 (age 28)	817	-	-
Sofia Macsali	20 August 2001 (age 24)	-	-	-
Emilia Petersen Norberg	25 June 2002 (age 23)	-	-	-
Natalie Syvertsen	24 November 1995 (age 30)	-	-	-
Frida Løvheim Bjørvik	27 September 2004 (age 21)	-	-	-

=== Previous squads ===
==== European Team Championships ====
- Men's team: 2020
- Women's team: 2020
