= Spain national badminton team =

National badminton team representing Spain

Spain
- Association: Federación Española de Bádminton (FESBA)
- Confederation: BE (Europe)
- President: Andoni Azumendi Ibarrola

BWF ranking
- Current ranking: 16 (6 October 2026)
- Highest ranking: 14 (4 April 2023)

Sudirman Cup
- Appearances: 8 (first in 1991)
- Best result: Group stage

Uber Cup
- Appearances: 4 (first in 2016)
- Best result: Group stage

European Mixed Team Championships
- Appearances: 12 (first in 1988)
- Best result: Group stage

European Men's Team Championships
- Appearances: 8 (first in 2004)
- Best result: Group stage

European Women's Team Championships
- Appearances: 8 (first in 2004)
- Best result: Semi-finals (2016, 2018)

Helvetia Cup
- Appearances: 10 (first in 1987)
- Best result: Champions (2001)

The Spain national badminton team (Spanish: Equipo nacional de bádminton de España) represents Spain in international badminton team competitions. The Spanish team have never participated in the Thomas Cup but have been in the Uber Cup and Sudirman Cup.

The Spanish team has enjoyed success throughout the individual events. Spain has won one Olympic medal in badminton and three gold medals at the BWF World Championships. All of these medals were won by former world number 1 Carolina Marín. Spain have also been successful in badminton at the European Games where Pablo Abián won gold in the men's singles discipline in 2015.

== Competitive record ==
=== Thomas Cup ===
Year	Round	Pos
1949	Did not enter	
1952	Did not enter	
1955	Did not enter	
1958	Did not enter	
1961	Did not enter	
1964	Did not enter	
1967	Did not enter	
1970	Did not enter	
1973	Did not enter	
1976	Did not enter	
1979	Did not enter	
1982	Did not enter	
1984	Did not enter	
1986	Did not enter	
1988	Did not qualify	
1990	Did not qualify	
1992	Did not qualify	
1994	Did not qualify	
1996	Did not qualify	
1998	Did not qualify	
2000	Did not qualify	
2002	Did not qualify	
2004	Did not qualify	
2006	Did not qualify	
2008	Did not qualify	
2010	Did not qualify	
2012	Did not qualify	
2014	Did not qualify	
2016	Did not qualify	
2018	Did not qualify	
2020	Did not qualify	
2022	Did not qualify	
2024	Did not qualify	
2026	Did not qualify	
2028	TBD	
2030	TBD	

=== Uber Cup ===
Year	Round	Pos
1957	Did not enter	
1960	Did not enter	
1963	Did not enter	
1966	Did not enter	
1969	Did not enter	
1972	Did not enter	
1975	Did not enter	
1978	Did not enter	
1981	Did not enter	
1984	Did not enter	
1986	Did not enter	
1988	Did not qualify	
1990	Did not qualify	
1992	Did not qualify	
1994	Did not qualify	
1996	Did not qualify	
1998	Did not qualify	
2000	Did not qualify	
2002	Did not qualify	
2004	Did not qualify	
2006	Did not qualify	
2008	Did not qualify	
2010	Did not qualify	
2012	Did not qualify	
2014	Did not qualify	
2016	Group stage	13th
2018	Withdrew	
2020	Group stage	10th
2022	Group stage	11th
2024	Qualified but withdrew	
2026	Group stage	13th
2028	TBD	
2030	TBD	

=== Sudirman Cup ===
Year	Round	Pos
1989	Did not enter	
1991	Group stage	32nd
1993	Did not enter	
1995	Group stage	36th
1997	Group stage	34th
1999	Group stage	33rd
2001	Group stage	31st
2003	Group stage	25th
2005	Did not enter	
2007	Group stage	32nd
2009	Did not enter	
2011	Did not enter	
2013	Did not enter	
2015	Group stage	17th
2017	Did not enter	
2019	Did not enter	
2021	Did not enter	
2023	Did not enter	
2025	Did not qualify	
2027	TBD	
2029	TBD	

=== European Team Championships ===
==== Men's team ====
Year	Round	Pos
2004	Group stage	10th
2006	Group stage	
2008	Group stage	
2010	Group stage	
2012	Group stage	
2014	Group stage	
2016	Group stage	
2018	Group stage	
2020	Group stage	
2024	Did not qualify	
2026	Group stage	6th
2028	To be determined	
2030	To be determined	

==== Women's team ====
Year	Round	Pos
2004	Group stage	16th
2006	Group stage	
2008	Group stage	
2010	Group stage	
2012	Group stage	
2014	Group stage	
2016	Semi-finals	4th
2018	Semi-finals	4th
2020	Group stage	
2024	Runners-up	2nd
2026	Did not qualify	
2028	To be determined	
2030	To be determined	

==== Mixed team ====
Year	Round	Pos
1972	Did not enter	
1974	Did not enter	
1976	Did not enter	
1978	Did not enter	
1980	Did not enter	
1982	Did not enter	
1984	Did not enter	
1986	Did not enter	
1988	Group stage	22nd
1990	Group stage	23rd
1992	Group stage	21st
1994	Did not qualify	
1996	Did not qualify	
1998	Did not qualify	
2000	Did not qualify	
2002	Group stage	12th
2004	Group stage	14th
2006	Group stage	15th
2008	Did not enter	
2009	Group stage	9th
2011	Group stage	17th
2013	Group stage	
2015	Withdrew	
2017	Group stage	
2019	Group stage	
2021	Did not qualify	
2023	Did not qualify	
2025	Group stage	5th
2027	TBD	
2029	TBD	

=== Helvetia Cup ===
Year	Round	Pos
1962	Did not enter	
1963	Did not enter	
1964	Did not enter	
1965	Did not enter	
1966	Did not enter	
1967	Did not enter	
1968	Did not enter	
1969	Did not enter	
1970	Did not enter	
1971	Did not enter	
1973	Did not enter	
1975	Did not enter	
1977	Did not enter	
1979	Did not enter	
1981	Did not enter	
1983	Did not enter	
1985	Did not enter	
1987	Group stage	13th
1989	Group stage	14th
1991	Group stage	9th
1993	Group stage	14th
1995	Group stage	6th
1997	Fourth place	4th
1999	Fourth place	4th
2001	Champions	1st
2003	Did not enter	
2005	Runners-up	2nd
2007	Group stage	6th

=== Plume d'Or ===
Year	Round	Pos
1972	Did not enter	
1973	Did not enter	
1974	Did not enter	
1976	Did not enter	
1977	Did not enter	
1978	Did not enter	
1979	Group stage	6th
1980	Group stage	7th
1981	Group stage	7th
1982	Did not enter	
1984	Group stage	6th
1985	Group stage	7th
1986	Group stage	7th
1987	Group stage	7th
1988	Fourth place	4th
1989	Fourth place	4th
1990	Did not enter	
1991	Did not enter	
1992	Did not enter	
1993	Did not enter	
1994	Did not enter	

=== FISU World University Games ===
==== Mixed team ====
Year	Round	Pos
2007	Group stage	
2011	Group stage	
2013	Did not enter	
2015	Did not enter	
2017	Did not enter	
2021	Did not enter	
2025	TBD	

=== World University Team Championships ===
==== Mixed team ====
Year	Round	Pos
2008	Group stage	
2010	Did not enter	
2012	Quarter-finals	
2014	Group stage	
2016	Did not enter	
2018	Did not enter	

**Red border color indicates tournament was held on home soil.

== Junior competitive record ==
=== Suhandinata Cup ===
Year	Round	Pos
2000	Did not enter	
2002	Did not enter	
2004	Did not enter	
2006	Did not enter	
2007	Did not enter	
2008	Did not enter	
2009	Did not enter	
2010	Did not enter	
2011	Did not enter	
2012	Did not enter	
2013	Group stage	25th
2014	Group stage	16th
2015	Group stage	16th
2016	Group stage	25th
2017	Group stage	13th
2018	Group stage	26th
2019	Group stage	14th
2022	Quarter-finals	8th
2023	Group stage	26th
2024	Did not enter	
2025	Did not enter	
2026	Group stage	16th of 47

=== European Junior Team Championships ===
==== Mixed team ====
Year	Round	Pos
1975	Did not enter	
1977	Did not enter	
1979	Did not enter	
1981	Did not enter	
1983	Did not enter	
1985	Group stage	22nd
1987	Group stage	21st
1989	Group stage	20th
1991	Group stage	21st
1993	Group stage	23rd
1995	Did not qualify	
1997	Did not qualify	
1999	Did not qualify	
2001	Group stage	16th
2003	Did not qualify	
2005	Group stage	14th
2007	Did not qualify	
2009	Group stage	
2011	Group stage	
2013	Did not enter	
2015	Champions	1st
2017	Group stage	
2018	Group stage	
2020	Quarter-finals	
2022	Semi-finals	4th
2024	Group stage	
2026	Quarter-finals	

=== Finlandia Cup ===
==== Mixed team ====
Year	Round	Pos
1984	Did not enter	
1986	Group stage	12th
1988	Group stage	13th
1990	Group stage	15th
1992	Group stage	12th
1994	Group stage	11th
1996	Group stage	6th
1998	Group stage	6th
2000	Third place	3rd
2002	Group stage	10th
2004	Runners-up	2nd
2006	Group stage	7th

**Red border color indicates tournament was held on home soil.

== Players ==
=== Current squad ===
As of 2 January 2024

==== Men's team ====
Name	DoB/Age	Ranking of event		
Name	DoB/Age	MS	MD	XD
Luís Enrique Peñalver	10 February 1996 (age 30)	79	-	-
Pablo Abián	12 June 1985 (age 41)	68	-	-
Álvaro Leal	1 June 2001 (age 25)	283	372	-
Ernesto Baschwitz	17 June 2001 (age 25)	516	372	-
Carlos Piris	9 February 2001 (age 25)	-	102	630
Rubén García	7 June 2004 (age 22)	-	102	132
Joan Monroy	26 February 2001 (age 25)	-	455	359
Jacobo Fernández	28 December 2003 (age 22)	-	241	139
Daniel Franco	6 April 2005 (age 21)	-	241	740
Alberto Perals	19 October 2000 (age 26)	541	-	-

==== Women's team ====
Name	DoB/Age	Ranking of event		
Name	DoB/Age	WS	WD	XD
Carolina Marín	15 June 1993 (age 33)	5	-	-
Clara Azurmendi	4 April 1998 (age 28)	51	81	-
Beatriz Corrales	3 December 1992 (age 33)	650	81	359
Ania Setien	6 March 2003 (age 23)	149	-	933
Nerea Ivorra	8 November 1997 (age 29)	666	285	1393
Claudia Leal	21 January 2000 (age 26)	-	285	662
Paula López	6 October 1999 (age 27)	-	92	139
Lucía Rodríguez	8 March 2004 (age 22)	-	92	132
Elena Lorenzo	18 October 2001 (age 25)	-	589	957
Macarena Izquierdo	30 March 2006 (age 20)	-	766	740

=== Previous squads ===
==== Uber Cup ====
- 2016, 2020, 2022
