= Czech Republic national badminton team =

National badminton team representing the Czech Republic

Czech Republic
- Association: Český Badmintonový Svaz (ČBS)
- Confederation: BE (Europe)
- President: Petr Martinec

BWF ranking
- Current ranking: 31 ▲1 (2 January 2024)
- Highest ranking: 20 (7 April 2016)

Sudirman Cup
- Appearances: 10 (first in 1993)
- Best result: Group stage

Thomas Cup
- Appearances: 1 (first in 2024)
- Best result: Group stage

European Mixed Team Championships
- Appearances: 9 (first in 1994)
- Best result: Group stage

European Men's Team Championships
- Appearances: 7 (first in 2006)
- Best result: Quarter-finals (2018)

European Women's Team Championships
- Appearances: 7 (first in 2006)
- Best result: Group stage

Helvetia Cup
- Appearances: 7 (first in 1993)
- Best result: Champions (2005)

The Czech Republic national badminton team (Czech: Českou reprezentaci v badmintonu) represents Czech Republic in international badminton team competitions. The Czech team competed in the 1991 Sudirman Cup under the Czechoslovakia national badminton team merged with Slovakia. The national team was formed after the dissolution of Czechoslovakia in 1992 and the Czech Republic and Slovakia were separated into two different national teams.

The Czech Badminton Federation is the governing body that controls the national team.

== Competitive record ==
=== Thomas Cup ===
Year	Round	Pos
1949	Part of Czechoslovakia	
1952	Part of Czechoslovakia	
1955	Part of Czechoslovakia	
1958	Part of Czechoslovakia	
1961	Part of Czechoslovakia	
1964	Part of Czechoslovakia	
1967	Part of Czechoslovakia	
1970	Part of Czechoslovakia	
1973	Part of Czechoslovakia	
1976	Part of Czechoslovakia	
1979	Part of Czechoslovakia	
1982	Part of Czechoslovakia	
1984	Part of Czechoslovakia	
1986	Part of Czechoslovakia	
1988	Part of Czechoslovakia	
1990	Part of Czechoslovakia	
1992	Part of Czechoslovakia	
1994	Did not enter	
1996	Did not qualify	
1998	Did not qualify	
2000	Did not qualify	
2002	Did not qualify	
2004	Did not qualify	
2006	Did not qualify	
2008	Did not qualify	
2010	Did not qualify	
2012	Did not qualify	
2014	Did not qualify	
2016	Did not qualify	
2018	Did not qualify	
2020	Did not qualify	
2022	Did not enter	
2024	Group stage	13th
2026	Did not qualify	
2028	To be determined	
2030	To be determined	

=== Uber Cup ===
Year	Round	Pos
1957	Part of Czechoslovakia	
1960	Part of Czechoslovakia	
1963	Part of Czechoslovakia	
1966	Part of Czechoslovakia	
1969	Part of Czechoslovakia	
1972	Part of Czechoslovakia	
1975	Part of Czechoslovakia	
1978	Part of Czechoslovakia	
1981	Part of Czechoslovakia	
1984	Part of Czechoslovakia	
1986	Part of Czechoslovakia	
1988	Part of Czechoslovakia	
1990	Part of Czechoslovakia	
1992	Part of Czechoslovakia	
1994	Did not qualify	
1996	Did not enter	
1998	Did not qualify	
2000	Did not qualify	
2002	Did not qualify	
2004	Did not qualify	
2006	Did not qualify	
2008	Did not qualify	
2010	Did not qualify	
2012	Did not qualify	
2014	Did not qualify	
2016	Did not qualify	
2018	Did not qualify	
2020	Did not qualify	
2022	Did not enter	
2024	Did not qualify	
2026	Did not qualify	
2028	To be determined	
2030	To be determined	

=== Sudirman Cup ===
Year	Round	Pos
1989	Part of Czechoslovakia	
1991	Part of Czechoslovakia	
1993	Group stage	23rd
1995	Group stage	22nd
1997	Group stage	30th
1999	Group stage	30th
2001	Group stage	32nd
2003	Group stage	20th
2005	Did not enter	
2007	Group stage	25th
2009	Group stage	22nd
2011	Group stage	24th
2013	Did not enter	
2015	Group stage	22nd
2017	Did not enter	
2019	Did not enter	
2021	Did not enter	
2023	Did not enter	
2025	Group stage	13th
2027	To be determined	
2029	To be determined	

=== European Team Championships ===
==== Men's team ====
Year	Round	Pos
2006	Group stage	-
2008	Group stage	-
2010	Group stage	-
2012	Group stage	-
2014	Group stage	-
2016	Group stage	-
2018	Group stage	-
2020	Group stage	-
2024	Group stage	-
2026	Did not qualify	
2028	To be determined	
2030	To be determined	

==== Women's team ====
Year	Round	Pos
2006	Group stage	-
2008	Group stage	-
2010	Group stage	-
2012	Group stage	-
2014	Group stage	-
2016	Group stage	-
2018	Group stage	-
2020	Group stage	-
2024	Group stage	-
2026	Group stage	8th
2028	TBD	
2030	TBD	

==== Mixed team ====
Year	Round	Pos
1972 to 1992	Part of Czechoslovakia	
1994	Group stage	15th
1996	Did not enter	
1998	Did not enter	
2000	Did not enter	
2002	Group stage	16th
2004	Group stage	16th
2006	Group stage	-
2008	Group stage	-
2009	Group stage	-
2011	Group stage	-
2013	Group stage	-
2015	Did not qualify	
2017	Did not qualify	
2019	Did not qualify	
2021	Did not qualify	
2023	Did not qualify	
2025	Group stage	6th
2027	To be determined	
2029	To be determined	

=== Helvetia Cup ===
Year	Round	Pos
1962 to 1991	Part of Czechoslovakia	
1993	Group stage	7th
1995	Group stage	7th
1997	Group stage	9th
1999	Group stage	9th
2001	Third place	3rd
2003	Third place	3rd
2005	Champions	1st
2007	Did not enter	

=== Plume d'Or ===
Year	Round	Pos
1972 to 1992	Part of Czechoslovakia	
1993	Runners-up	2nd
1994	Did not enter	

**Red border color indicates tournament was held on home soil.

== Junior competitive record ==
=== Suhandinata Cup ===
Year	Round	Pos
2000	Group stage	22nd
2002	Group stage	19th
2004	Group stage	19th
2006	Group stage	15th
2007	Group stage	20th
2008	Group stage	20th
2009	Did not enter	
2010	Did not enter	
2011	Did not enter	
2012	Group stage	25th
2013	Group stage	23rd
2014	Group stage	29th
2015	Did not enter	
2016	Group stage	16th
2017	Group stage	41st
2018	Group stage	20th
2019	Group stage	17th
2022	Group stage	15th
2023	Did not enter	
2024	Did not enter	
2025	Did not enter	
2026	Group stage	15th of 47

=== European Junior Team Championships ===
==== Mixed team ====
Year	Round	Pos
1975 to 1991	Part of Czechoslovakia	
1993	Group stage	22nd
1995	Did not qualify	
1997	Did not qualify	
1999	Group stage	11th
2001	Group stage	15th
2003	Did not qualify	
2005	Group stage	10th
2007	Group stage	7th
2009	Group stage	-
2011	Group stage	-
2013	Group stage	-
2015	Group stage	-
2017	Group stage	-
2018	Group stage	-
2020	Group stage	-
2022	Group stage	-
2024	Group stage	-

=== Finlandia Cup ===
==== Mixed team ====
Year	Round	Pos
1984 to 1992	Part of Czechoslovakia	
1994	Group stage	6th
1996	Group stage	10th
1998	Runners-up	2nd
2000	Did not enter	
2002	Fourth place	4th
2004	Champions	1st
2006	Did not enter	

**Red border color indicates tournament was held on home soil.

== Players ==
=== Current squad ===
As of 2 January 2024

==== Men's team ====
Name	DoB/Age	Ranking of event		
Name	DoB/Age	MS	MD	XD
Jan Louda	25 April 1999 (age 27)	49	-	-
Jiří Král	19 December 2000 (age 25)	278	-	-
Dominik Kopřiva	23 September 2004 (age 22)	415	-	-
Adam Mendrek	14 November 1995 (age 30)	1802	59	-
Ondřej Král	15 April 1999 (age 27)	-	59	-
Vít Kulíšek	13 June 2001 (age 25)	-	159	186
Tomáš Švejda	14 March 2002 (age 24)	-	159	269
Jan Janoštík	19 November 2003 (age 22)	540	250	563
Tadeáš Brázda	17 September 2002 (age 24)	1211	250	-
David Smutný	25 May 2004 (age 22)	1036	-	-

==== Women's team ====
Name	DoB/Age	Ranking of event		
Name	DoB/Age	WS	WD	XD
Tereza Švábíková	14 May 2000 (age 26)	81	-	-
Kateřina Tomalová	10 April 1992 (age 34)	177	-	-
Kateřina Mikelová	7 July 2002 (age 24)	215	-	-
Sharleen van Coppenolle	13 September 2003 (age 23)	205	481	563
Veronika Dobiášová	9 June 1999 (age 27)	195	128	-
Veronika Brožkovcová	5 May 1999 (age 27)	-	128	-
Petra Maixnerová	6 September 2005 (age 21)	220	263	-
Lucie Krulová	29 November 2006 (age 19)	210	263	-
Soňa Hořinkova	30 April 2003 (age 23)	833	146	269
Kateřina Zuzáková	14 February 2002 (age 24)	-	146	186

=== Previous squads ===
==== European Team Championships ====
- Men's team: 2020
- Women's team: 2020
