= Switzerland national badminton team =

National badminton team representing Switzerland

Switzerland
- Association: Swiss Badminton (SB)
- Confederation: BE (Europe)
- President: Robbert de Kock

BWF ranking
- Current ranking: 42 ▼3 (2 January 2024)
- Highest ranking: 24 (3 October 2013)

Sudirman Cup
- Appearances: 13 (first in 1991)
- Best result: Group stage

European Mixed Team Championships
- Appearances: 16 (first in 1976)
- Best result: Group stage

European Men's Team Championships
- Appearances: 5 (first in 2004)
- Best result: Group stage

European Women's Team Championships
- Appearances: 5 (first in 2004)
- Best result: Group stage

Helvetia Cup
- Appearances: 27 (first in 1962)
- Best result: Third place (1997, 2007)

The Switzerland national badminton team (German: Schweizer badminton-nationalmannschaft; French: Équipe nationale Suisse de badminton; Italian: Nazionale Svizzera di badminton; Romansh: Squadra naziunal Svizra da badminton; Latin: Helvetia nationalibus quadrigis badminton) represents Switzerland in international badminton team competitions. It is controlled by Swiss Badminton, Switzerland's governing body for badminton. The Swiss national team debuted in the Sudirman Cup in 1991. The men's and women's team debuted in the 2006 European Men's and Women's Team Badminton Championships in Greece.

The best result the team has achieved was when the women's team reached the quarterfinals of the 2012 European Women's Team Badminton Championships.

== Competitive record ==
=== Thomas Cup ===
Year	Round	Pos
1949	Did not enter	
1952	Did not enter	
1955	Did not enter	
1958	Did not enter	
1961	Did not enter	
1964	Did not enter	
1967	Did not enter	
1970	Did not enter	
1973	Did not enter	
1976	Did not enter	
1979	Did not enter	
1982	Did not enter	
1984	Did not enter	
1986	Did not qualify	
1988	Did not qualify	
1990	Did not qualify	
1992	Did not qualify	
1994	Did not qualify	
1996	Did not qualify	
1998	Did not qualify	
2000	Did not qualify	
2002	Did not qualify	
2004	Did not qualify	
2006	Did not qualify	
2008	Did not qualify	
2010	Did not enter	
2012	Did not enter	
2014	Did not qualify	
2016	Did not enter	
2018	Did not enter	
2020	Did not qualify	
2022	Did not qualify	
2024	Did not enter	
2026	Did not qualify	
2028	TBD	
2030	TBD	

=== Uber Cup ===
Year	Round	Pos
1957	Did not enter	
1960	Did not enter	
1963	Did not enter	
1966	Did not enter	
1969	Did not enter	
1972	Did not enter	
1975	Did not enter	
1978	Did not enter	
1981	Did not enter	
1984	Did not enter	
1986	Did not qualify	
1988	Did not qualify	
1990	Did not qualify	
1992	Did not qualify	
1994	Did not qualify	
1996	Did not qualify	
1998	Did not qualify	
2000	Did not qualify	
2002	Did not qualify	
2004	Did not qualify	
2006	Did not qualify	
2008	Did not qualify	
2010	Did not enter	
2012	Did not qualify	
2014	Did not qualify	
2016	Did not enter	
2018	Did not enter	
2020	Did not enter	
2022	Did not qualify	
2024	Did not enter	
2026	Did not qualify	
2028	TBD	
2030	TBD	

=== Sudirman Cup ===
Year	Round	Pos
1989	Did not enter	
1991	Group stage	28th
1993	Group stage	27th
1995	Group stage	24th
1997	Group stage	28th
1999	Group stage	26th
2001	Group stage	29th
2003	Group stage	28th
2005	Group stage	26th
2007	Group stage	29th
2009	Group stage	25th
2011	Did not enter	
2013	Group stage	25th
2015	Group stage	26th
2017	Did not enter	
2019	Group stage	23rd
2021	Did not enter	
2023	Did not enter	
2025	TBD	
2027	TBD	
2029	TBD	

=== European Team Championships ===
==== Men's team ====
Year	Round	Pos
2004	Group stage	30th
2006	Group stage	
2008	Group stage	
2010	Did not enter	
2012	Group stage	
2014	Group stage	
2016	Did not enter	
2018	Did not enter	
2020	Group stage	
2024	Did not qualify	
2026	Did not qualify	
2028	To be determined	
2030	To be determined	

==== Women's team ====
Year	Round	Pos
2004	Group stage	9th
2006	Group stage	
2008	Group stage	
2010	Did not enter	
2012	Group stage	
2014	Group stage	
2016	Did not enter	
2018	Did not enter	
2020	Did not enter	
2024	Did not qualify	
2026	Did not qualify	
2028	To be determined	
2030	To be determined	

==== Mixed team ====
Year	Round	Pos
1972	Did not enter	
1974	Did not enter	
1976	Group stage	12th
1978	Group stage	13th
1980	Group stage	19th
1982	Group stage	18th
1984	Group stage	16th
1986	Group stage	18th
1988	Group stage	19th
1990	Group stage	20th
1992	Group stage	19th
1994	Group stage	17th
1996	Did not enter	
1998	Group stage	11th
2000	Group stage	15th
2002	Did not qualify	
2004	Did not qualify	
2006	Did not qualify	
2008	Did not qualify	
2009	Group stage	
2011	Group stage	
2013	Group stage	
2015	Did not qualify	
2017	Group stage	
2019	Did not qualify	
2021	Did not qualify	
2023	Did not qualify	
2025	Did not qualify	
2027	TBD	
2029	TBD	

=== Helvetia Cup ===
Year	Round	Pos
1962	Fifth place	5th
1963	Fifth place	5th
1964	Fifth place	5th
1965	Sixth place	6th
1966	Sixth place	6th
1967	Sixth place	6th
1968	Group stage	7th
1969	Group stage	8th
1970	Group stage	7th
1971	Group stage	6th
1973	Group stage	5th
1975	Group stage	7th
1977	Group stage	11th
1979	Group stage	13th
1981	Group stage	8th
1983	Group stage	11th
1985	Group stage	11th
1987	Group stage	10th
1989	Group stage	11th
1991	Group stage	7th
1993	Group stage	9th
1995	Fourth place	4th
1997	Third place	3rd
1999	Did not enter	
2001	Group stage	8th
2003	Group stage	8th
2005	Group stage	9th
2007	Third place	3rd

=== Plume d'Or ===
Year	Round	Pos
1972	Third place	3rd
1973	Third place	3rd
1974	Runners-up	2nd
1976	Champions	1st
1977	Runners-up	2nd
1978	Fourth place	4th
1979	Runners-up	2nd
1980	Third place	3rd
1981	Third place	3rd
1982	Third place	3rd
1984	Third place	3rd
1985	Runners-up	2nd
1986	Fourth place	4th
1987	Champions	1st
1988	Third place	3rd
1989	Did not enter	
1990	Did not enter	
1991	Did not enter	
1992	Did not enter	
1993	Champions	1st
1994	Third place	3rd

=== FISU World University Games ===
==== Mixed team ====
Year	Round	Pos
2007	Did not enter	
2011	Did not enter	
2013	Did not enter	
2015	Group stage	
2017	Did not enter	
2021	Group stage	
2025	TBD	

=== World University Team Championships ===
==== Mixed team ====
Year	Round	Pos
2008	Group stage	
2010	Group stage	
2012	Did not enter	
2014	Quarter-finals	
2016	Did not enter	
2018	Did not enter	

**Red border color indicates tournament was held on home soil.

== Junior competitive record ==
=== Suhandinata Cup ===
Year	Round	Pos
2000	Did not enter	
2002	Did not enter	
2004	Did not enter	
2006	Did not enter	
2007	Did not enter	
2008	Did not enter	
2009	Did not enter	
2010	Did not enter	
2011	Did not enter	
2012	Did not enter	
2013	Did not enter	
2014	Did not enter	
2015	Did not enter	
2016	Did not enter	
2017	Did not enter	
2018	Did not enter	
2019	Group stage	16th
2022	Did not enter	
2023	Did not enter	
2024	Quarter-finals	

=== European Junior Team Championships ===
==== Mixed team ====
Year	Round	Pos
1975	Did not enter	
1977	Did not enter	
1979	Group stage	16th
1981	Group stage	14th
1983	Group stage	16th
1985	Group stage	17th
1987	Group stage	19th
1989	Group stage	14th
1991	Group stage	19th
1993	Group stage	19th
1995	Did not enter	
1997	Group stage	12th
1999	Group stage	16th
2001	Did not enter	
2003	Did not enter	
2005	Did not enter	
2007	Group stage	13th
2009	Group stage	
2011	Group stage	
2013	Group stage	
2015	Group stage	
2017	Group stage	
2018	Group stage	
2020	Group stage	
2022	Group stage	
2024	Quarter-finals	

=== Finlandia Cup ===
==== Mixed team ====
Year	Round	Pos
1984	Group stage	9th
1986	Group stage	11th
1988	Group stage	11th
1990	Group stage	7th
1992	Group stage	7th
1994	Fourth place	4th
1996	Did not enter	
1998	Did not enter	
2000	Group stage	9th
2002	Group stage	6th
2004	Group stage	5th
2006	Runners-up	2nd

**Red border color indicates tournament was held on home soil.

== Players ==
=== Current squad ===
As of 2 January 2024

==== Men's team ====
Name	DoB/Age	Ranking of event		
Name	DoB/Age	MS	MD	XD
Tobias Künzi	18 February 1998 (age 28)	117	986	-
Julien Scheiwiller	24 September 1999 (age 26)	167	1082	-
Arthur Boudier	4 June 2002 (age 23)	-	218	272
Minh-Quang Pham	7 May 2001 (age 24)	-	218	172
Joel König	6 July 1995 (age 30)	160	-	-
Nicolas A. Müller	28 December 2000 (age 25)	245	581	-
Patrick Zbinden	23 March 2001 (age 24)	371	1301	-
Soen Rimmer	5 September 2000 (age 25)	1032	1110	1425

==== Women's team ====
Name	DoB/Age	Ranking of event		
Name	DoB/Age	WS	WD	XD
Jenjira Stadelmann	20 November 1999 (age 26)	68	859	-
Dounia Pelupessy	10 October 2002 (age 23)	169	-	-
Aline Müller	17 July 1999 (age 26)	-	141	175
Caroline Racloz	9 January 2002 (age 24)	-	141	172
Milena Schnider	10 November 2001 (age 24)	167	982	-
Ronja Stern	29 June 1997 (age 28)	1207	-	-
Lucie Amiguet	8 August 2004 (age 21)	382	300	1138
Vera Appenzeller	30 August 2004 (age 21)	1101	300	1313

=== Previous squads ===
==== Sudirman Cup ====
- 2019

==== European Team Championships ====
- Men's team: 2020
