= Germany national badminton team =

German national badminton team

Germany
- Association: Deutscher Badminton-Verband (DBV)
- Confederation: BE (Europe)
- President: Ralf Michaelis

BWF ranking
- Current ranking: 15 (6 October 2026)
- Highest ranking: 7 (6 October 2011)

Sudirman Cup
- Appearances: 18 (first in 1989)
- Best result: Quarter-finals (2013, 2015)

Thomas Cup
- Appearances: 11 (first in 2002)
- Best result: Quarter-finals (2004, 2010, 2012)

Uber Cup
- Appearances: 11 (first in 2002)
- Best result: Semi-finals (2006, 2008)

European Mixed Team Championships
- Appearances: 28 (first in 1972)
- Best result: Champions (2013)

European Men's Team Championships
- Appearances: 8 (first in 2006)
- Best result: Runners-up (2006, 2012)

European Women's Team Championships
- Appearances: 8 (first in 2006)
- Best result: Champions (2012)

Helvetia Cup
- Appearances: 12 (first in 1962)
- Best result: Champions (1962, 1963, 1964, 1965, 1966, 1967, 1968, 1969, 1970, 1971, 1983, 1987)

The Germany national badminton team (German: Deutsche badminton-nationalmannschaft) represents Germany in international badminton team competitions. It is controlled by the German Badminton Association (German: Deutscher Badminton-Verband), the national organization for badminton in the nation. Germany have two bronze finishes at the Uber Cup, particularly in 2006 and 2008. The women's team were also champions in the 2012 Women's Team Badminton Championships.

In the mixed team competition, the German team won gold in the 2013 European Mixed Team Badminton Championships after upsetting Denmark with a score of 3-0 in the final tie.

== Competitive record ==
=== Thomas Cup ===
Year	Round	Pos
1949	Did not enter	
1952	Did not enter	
1955	Did not qualify	
1958	Did not enter	
1961	Did not enter	
1964	Did not qualify	
1967	Did not qualify	
1970	Did not qualify	
1973	Did not qualify	
1976	Did not qualify	
1979	Did not qualify	
1982	Did not qualify	
1984	Did not qualify	
1986	Did not qualify	
1988	Did not qualify	
1990	Did not qualify	
1992	Did not qualify	
1994	Did not qualify	
1996	Did not qualify	
1998	Did not qualify	
2000	Did not qualify	
2002	Group stage	7th
2004	Quarter-finals	5/8
2006	Round of 16	9/12
2008	Round of 16	9/12
2010	Quarter-finals	5/8
2012	Quarter-finals	5/8
2014	Group stage	13th
2016	Group stage	15th
2018	Group stage	13th
2020	Group stage	10th
2022	Group stage	12th
2024	Group stage	11th
2026	Qualified but declined	
2028	To be determined	
2030	To be determined	

=== Uber Cup ===
Year	Round	Pos
1957	Did not enter	
1960	Did not enter	
1963	Did not enter	
1966	Did not qualify	
1969	Did not qualify	
1972	Did not qualify	
1975	Did not qualify	
1978	Did not qualify	
1981	Did not enter	
1984	Did not qualify	
1986	Did not qualify	
1988	Did not qualify	
1990	Did not qualify	
1992	Did not qualify	
1994	Did not qualify	
1996	Did not qualify	
1998	Did not qualify	
2000	Did not qualify	
2002	Group stage	8th
2004	Group stage	9/12
2006	Semi-finals	4th
2008	Semi-finals	4th
2010	Group stage	9/12
2012	Quarter-finals	5/8
2014	Group stage	15th
2016	Group stage	12th
2018	Group stage	14th
2020	Group stage	14th
2022	Group stage	12th
2024	Did not qualify	
2026	Did not qualify	
2028	To be determined	
2030	To be determined	

=== Sudirman Cup ===
Year	Round	Pos
1989	Group stage	17th
1991	Group stage	16th
1993	Group stage	15th
1995	Group stage	13th
1997	Group stage	8th
1999	Group stage	11th
2001	Group stage	10th
2003	Group stage	12th
2005	Group stage	13th
2007	Group stage	13th
2009	Group stage	13th
2011	Group stage	10th
2013	Quarter-finals	8th
2015	Quarter-finals	8th
2017	Group stage	12th
2019	Group stage	16th
2021	Group stage	10th
2023	Group stage	13th
2025	Qualified but declined	
2027	To be determined	
2029	To be determined	

=== European Team Championships ===
==== Men's team ====
Year	Round	Pos
2006	Runners-up	2nd
2008	Third place	3rd
2010	Third place	3rd
2012	Runners-up	2nd
2014	Semi-finals	3rd
2016	Semi-finals	4th
2018	Semi-finals	3rd
2020	Quarter-finals	5/8
2024	Semi-finals	3rd
2026	Group stage	5th
2028	To be determined	
2030	To be determined	

==== Women's team ====
Year	Round	Pos
2006	Third place	3rd
2008	Third place	3rd
2010	Third place	3rd
2012	Champions	1st
2014	Semi-finals	3rd
2016	Semi-finals	3rd
2018	Runners-up	2nd
2020	Runners-up	2nd
2024	Group stage	5th
2026	Group stage	6th
2028	To be determined	
2030	To be determined	

==== Mixed team ====
Year	Round	Pos
1972	Third place	3rd
1974	Fourth place	4th
1976	Group stage	5th
1978	Group stage	5th
1980	Group stage	6th
1982	Group stage	8th
1984	Group stage	6th
1986	Group stage	7th
1988	Group stage	6th
1990	Group stage	7th
1992	Group stage	7th
1994	Group stage	5th
1996	Group stage	6th
1998	Group stage	5th
2000	Group stage	5th
2002	Fourth place	4th
2004	Third place	3rd
2006	Fourth place	4th
2008	Group stage	5th
2009	Quarter-finals	5/8
2011	Runners-up	2nd
2013	Champions	1st
2015	Semi-finals	4th
2017	Semi-finals	3rd
2019	Runners-up	2nd
2021	Semi-finals	4th
2023	Semi-finals	4th
2025	Semi-finals	3rd
2027	To be determined	
2029	To be determined	

=== Helvetia Cup ===
Year	Round	Pos
1962	Champions	1st
1963	Champions	1st
1964	Champions	1st
1965	Champions	1st
1966	Champions	1st
1967	Champions	1st
1968	Champions	1st
1969	Champions	1st
1970	Champions	1st
1971	Champions	1st
1973	Did not enter	
1975	Did not enter	
1977	Did not enter	
1979	Did not enter	
1981	Did not enter	
1983	Champions	1st
1985	Did not enter	
1987	Champions	1st
1989	Did not enter	
1991	Did not enter	
1993	Did not enter	
1995	Did not enter	
1997	Did not enter	
1999	Did not enter	
2001	Did not enter	
2003	Did not enter	
2005	Did not enter	
2007	Did not enter	

=== FISU World University Games ===
==== Mixed team ====
Year	Round	Pos
2007	Quarter-finals	5/6
2011	Group stage	9/13
2013	Quarter-finals	8th
2015	Quarter-finals	5/8
2017	Quarter-finals	5/8
2021	Group stage	10th
2025	To be determined	

=== World University Team Championships ===
==== Mixed team ====
Year	Round	Pos
2008	Group stage	11/17
2010	Did not enter	
2012	Did not enter	
2014	Quarter-finals	5/8
2016	Quarter-finals	5/8
2018	Quarter-finals	5/8

**Red border color indicates tournament was held on home soil.

== Junior competitive record ==
=== Suhandinata Cup ===
Year	Round	Pos
2000	Group stage	6th
2002	Group stage	6th
2004	Group stage	8th
2006	Group stage	11th
2007	Group stage	24th
2008	Group stage	16th
2009	Group stage	17th
2010	Group stage	12th
2011	Group stage	16th
2012	Group stage	10th
2013	Group stage	15th
2014	Group stage	11th
2015	Group stage	12th
2016	Group stage	13th
2017	Group stage	26th
2018	Group stage	21st
2019	Group stage	15th
2022	Group stage	16th
2023	Group stage	12th
2024	Did not enter	
2025	Did not enter	
2026	Group stage	19th of 47

=== European Junior Team Championships ===
==== Mixed team ====
Year	Round	Pos
1975	Fourth place	4th
1977	Fourth place	4th
1979	Fourth place	4th
1981	Group stage	5th
1983	Group stage	6th
1985	Fourth place	4th
1987	Group stage	6th
1989	Group stage	5th
1991	Group stage	7th
1993	Group stage	6th
1995	Fourth place	4th
1997	Group stage	5th
1999	Champions	1st
2001	Champions	1st
2003	Champions	1st
2005	Third place	3rd
2007	Group stage	5th
2009	Semi-finals	4th
2011	Champions	1st
2013	Semi-finals	3rd
2015	Quarter-finals	5/8
2017	Semi-finals	3rd
2018	Quarter-finals	5/8
2020	Quarter-finals	5/8
2022	Quarter-finals	5/8
2024	Quarter-finals	5/8
2026	Semi-finals	3rd

=== Finlandia Cup ===
==== Mixed team ====
Year	Round	Pos
1984	Did not enter	
1986	Did not enter	
1988	Did not enter	
1990	Did not enter	
1992	Champions	1st
1994	Did not enter	
1996	Did not enter	
1998	Did not enter	
2000	Did not enter	
2002	Did not enter	
2004	Did not enter	
2006	Did not enter	

**Red border color indicates tournament was held on home soil.

== Players ==
=== Current squad ===
As of 2 January 2024

==== Men's team ====
Name	DoB/age	Ranking of event		
Name	DoB/age	MS	MD	XD
Kai Schäfer	13 June 1993 (age 33)	77	-	-
Fabian Roth	29 November 1995 (age 30)	80	-	-
Max Weißkirchen	18 October 1996 (age 30)	98	187	-
Matthias Kicklitz	5 April 2002 (age 24)	113	187	-
Mark Lamsfuß	19 April 1994 (age 32)	-	24	30
Marvin Seidel	9 November 1995 (age 31)	-	24	-
Bjarne Geiss	29 November 1997 (age 28)	-	57	457
Jan Colin Völker	26 February 1998 (age 28)	-	57	50
Daniel Hess	31 July 1998 (age 28)	-	108	254
Patrick Scheiel	6 October 1998 (age 28)	-	108	73
Jones Ralfy Jansen	12 November 1992 (age 34)	-	121	58
Kenneth Neumann	17 September 2004 (age 22)	-	121	-

==== Women's team ====
Name	DoB/age	Ranking of event		
Name	DoB/age	WS	WD	XD
Yvonne Li	30 May 1998 (age 28)	27	-	-
Miranda Wilson	6 April 2000 (age 26)	192	979	-
Florentine Schöffski	8 May 2003 (age 23)	216	-	1124
Antonia Schaller	24 January 2004 (age 22)	322	871	-
Isabel Lohau	17 March 1992 (age 34)	-	32	30
Linda Efler	23 January 1995 (age 31)	-	32	58
Stine Küspert	24 July 1999 (age 27)	-	56	50
Emma Moszczynski	7 June 2001 (age 25)	-	56	539
Franziska Volkmann	4 April 1994 (age 32)	-	556	73
Leona Michalski	14 June 2002 (age 24)	1243	98	88
Selin Hübsch	1 May 2005 (age 21)	986	558	-
Thuc Phuong Nguyen	23 March 2003 (age 23)	-	-	156
