= Netherlands national badminton team =

National badminton team representing the Netherlands

Netherlands
- Association: Badminton Nederland (BN)
- Confederation: BE (Europe)
- President: Jan Helmond

BWF ranking
- Current ranking: 20 ▼2 (2 January 2024)
- Highest ranking: 11 (7 January 2020)

Sudirman Cup
- Appearances: 15 (first in 1989)
- Best result: Group stage

Thomas Cup
- Appearances: 2 (first in 1998)
- Best result: Group stage

Uber Cup
- Appearances: 10 (first in 1988)
- Best result: (silver) Runners-up (2006)

European Mixed Team Championships
- Appearances: 28 (first in 1972)
- Best result: Runners-up (2004, 2006)

European Men's Team Championships
- Appearances: 6 (first in 2006)
- Best result: (silver) Runners-up (2020)

European Women's Team Championships
- Appearances: 6 (first in 2006)
- Best result: Champions (2006)

Helvetia Cup
- Appearances: 11 (first in 1962)
- Best result: Champions (1985)

The Netherlands national badminton team (Dutch: Nederlands nationaal badmintonteam) represents the Netherlands in international badminton team competitions. It is controlled by Badminton Nederland. The Dutch women's team had enjoyed success in the 2000s as the team were runners-up at the 2006 Uber Cup and were champions at the 2006 European Women's Team Badminton Championships when they beat England.

The men's team were runners-up at the 2020 European Men's Team Badminton Championships after losing 3-0 to Denmark. They also participated in the Thomas Cup but never got past the group stage.

== Competitive record ==
=== Thomas Cup ===
Year	Round	Pos
1949	Did not enter	
1952	Did not enter	
1955	Did not enter	
1958	Did not enter	
1961	Did not enter	
1964	Did not qualify	
1967	Did not qualify	
1970	Did not qualify	
1973	Did not qualify	
1976	Did not qualify	
1979	Did not qualify	
1982	Did not qualify	
1984	Did not qualify	
1986	Did not qualify	
1988	Did not qualify	
1990	Did not qualify	
1992	Did not qualify	
1994	Did not qualify	
1996	Did not qualify	
1998	Group stage	8th
2000	Did not qualify	
2002	Did not qualify	
2004	Did not qualify	
2006	Did not qualify	
2008	Did not qualify	
2010	Did not qualify	
2012	Did not qualify	
2014	Did not qualify	
2016	Did not qualify	
2018	Did not qualify	
2020	Group stage	11th
2022	Did not enter	
2024	Did not qualify	
2026	Did not qualify	
2028	To be determined	
2030	To be determined	

=== Uber Cup ===
Year	Round	Pos
1957	Did not enter	
1960	Did not enter	
1963	Did not enter	
1966	Did not qualify	
1969	Did not qualify	
1972	Did not qualify	
1975	Did not qualify	
1978	Did not qualify	
1981	Did not qualify	
1984	Did not qualify	
1986	Did not qualify	
1988	Group stage	7th
1990	Group stage	6th
1992	Group stage	8th
1994	Did not qualify	
1996	Did not qualify	
1998	Group stage	7th
2000	Group stage	6th
2002	Semi-finals	3rd
2004	Quarter-finals	5/8
2006	Runners-up	2nd
2008	Quarter-finals	5/8
2010	Did not qualify	
2012	Group stage	9/12
2014	Did not qualify	
2016	Did not qualify	
2018	Did not qualify	
2020	Did not qualify	
2022	Did not enter	
2024	Did not qualify	
2026	Did not qualify	
2028	To be determined	
2030	To be determined	

=== Sudirman Cup ===
Year	Round	Pos
1989	Group stage	8th
1991	Group stage	8th
1993	Group stage	8th
1995	Group stage	8th
1997	Group stage	10th
1999	Group stage	9th
2001	Group stage	9th
2003	Group stage	10th
2005	Group stage	12th
2007	Group stage	14th
2009	Group stage	14th
2011	Group stage	20th
2013	Group stage	15th
2015	Group stage	14th
2017	Did not enter	
2019	Group stage	15th
2021	Did not qualify	
2023	Did not qualify	
2025	Did not qualify	
2027	To be determined	
2029	To be determined	

=== European Team Championships ===
==== Men's team ====
Year	Round	Pos
2006	Fourth place	4th
2008	Quarter-finals	5/8
2010	Quarter-finals	5/8
2012	Quarter-finals	5/8
2014	Group stage	9/12
2016	Did not enter	
2018	Did not enter	
2020	Runners-up	2nd
2024	Group stage	5th
2026	Did not qualify	
2028	To be determined	
2030	To be determined	

==== Women's team ====
Year	Round	Pos
2006	Champions	1st
2008	Runners-up	2nd
2010	Fourth place	4th
2012	Third place	3rd
2014	Group stage	16/20
2016	Did not enter	
2018	Did not enter	
2020	Group stage	15/22
2024	Group stage	7th
2026	Did not qualify	
2028	To be determined	
2030	To be determined	

==== Mixed team ====
Year	Round	Pos
1972	Group stage	6th
1974	Group stage	5th
1976	Fourth place	4th
1978	Fourth place	4th
1980	Fourth place	4th
1982	Fourth place	4th
1984	Group stage	7th
1986	Group stage	6th
1988	Group stage	5th
1990	Group stage	5th
1992	Group stage	6th
1994	Group stage	6th
1996	Group stage	5th
1998	Fourth place	4th
2000	Third place	3rd
2002	Third place	3rd
2004	Runners-up	2nd
2006	Runners-up	2nd
2008	Fourth place	4th
2009	Quarter-finals	5/8
2011	Quarter-finals	5/8
2013	Quarter-finals	5/8
2015	Quarter-finals	5/8
2017	Quarter-finals	5/8
2019	Third place	3rd
2021	Group stage	6th
2023	Group stage	6th
2025	Group stage	7th
2027	To be determined	
2029	To be determined	

=== Helvetia Cup ===
Year	Round	Pos
1962	Runners-up	2nd
1963	Fourth place	4th
1964	Third place	3rd
1965	Runners-up	2nd
1966	Runners-up	2nd
1967	Runners-up	2nd
1968	Third place	3rd
1969	Runners-up	2nd
1970	Runners-up	2nd
1971	Runners-up	2nd
1973	Did not enter	
1975	Did not enter	
1977	Did not enter	
1979	Did not enter	
1981	Did not enter	
1983	Did not enter	
1985	Champions	1st
1987	Did not enter	
1989	Did not enter	
1991	Did not enter	
1993	Did not enter	
1995	Did not enter	
1997	Did not enter	
1999	Did not enter	
2001	Did not enter	
2003	Did not enter	
2005	Did not enter	
2007	Did not enter	

**Red border color indicates tournament was held on home soil.

== Junior competitive record ==
=== Suhandinata Cup ===
Year	Round	Pos
(China) 2000	Group stage	14th of 24
(South Africa) 2002	Group stage	13th of 23
(Canada) 2004	Group stage	17th of 20
(South Korea) 2006	Group stage	14th of 28
(New Zealand) 2007	Group stage	13th of 25
(India) 2008	Did not enter	
(Malaysia) 2009	Did not enter	
(Mexico) 2010	Group stage	14th of 24
(Taiwan) 2011	Quarter-finals	8th of 22
(Japan) 2012	Group stage	12th of 30
(Thailand) 2013	Did not enter	
(Malaysia) 2014	Group stage	18th of 33
(Peru) 2015	Group stage	15th of 39
(Spain) 2016	Group stage	20th of 52
(Indonesia) 2017	Group stage	33rd of 44
(Canada) 2018	Group stage	29th of 39
(Russia) 2019	Did not enter	
(New Zealand) 2020	Cancelled because of COVID-19 pandemic	
(China) 2021	Cancelled because of COVID-19 pandemic	
(Spain) 2022	Group stage	26th of 37
(United States) 2023	Group stage	21st of 38
(China) 2024	Group stage	23rd of 39
(India) 2025	Group stage	33rd of 36

=== European Junior Team Championships ===
==== Mixed team ====
Year	Round	Pos
1975	Group stage	6th
1977	Group stage	7th
1979	Group stage	7th
1981	Fourth place	4th
1983	Fourth place	4th
1985	Group stage	6th
1987	Fourth place	4th
1989	Fourth place	4th
1991	Runners-up	2nd
1993	Fourth place	4th
1995	Group stage	5th
1997	Third place	3rd
1999	Group stage	7th
2001	Group stage	7th
2003	Group stage	5th
2005	Fourth place	4th
2007	Runners-up	2nd
2009	Runners-up	2nd
2011	Quarter-finals	5/8
2013	Semi-finals	4th
2015	Quarter-finals	5/8
2017	Quarter-finals	5/8
2018	Group stage	9/16
2020	Did not enter	
2022	Group stage	9/16
2024	Semi-finals	4th

**Red border color indicates tournament was held on home soil.

== Players ==
=== Current squad ===
As of 2 January 2024

==== Men's team ====
Name	DoB/Age	Ranking of event		
Name	DoB/Age	MS	MD	XD
Mark Caljouw	25 January 1995 (age 31)	52	-	-
Joran Kweekel	16 May 1998 (age 28)	100	-	-
Finn Achthoven	1 February 2002 (age 24)	311	717	740
Noah Haase	11 February 2005 (age 21)	412	717	-
Ruben Jille	11 July 1996 (age 30)	-	58	-
Ties van der Lecq	10 March 2000 (age 26)	-	58	125
Dyon van Wijlick	20 November 2003 (age 22)	-	203	147
Brian Wassink	3 January 2001 (age 25)	-	203	234
Robin Tabeling	24 April 1994 (age 32)	-	454	16
Andy Buijk	25 February 2002 (age 24)	-	355	112

==== Men's team ====
Name	DoB/Age	Ranking of event		
Name	DoB/Age	WS	WD	XD
Jaymie Laurens	22 August 2003 (age 22)	157	579	299
Diede Odijk	21 November 2003 (age 22)	256	175	973
Nadia Choukri	21 April 2003 (age 23)	310	871	-
Novi Wieland	26 November 2003 (age 22)	278	589	733
Debora Jille	11 September 1999 (age 26)	-	33	221
Cheryl Seinen	4 August 1995 (age 30)	-	33	-
Alyssa Tirtosentono	29 May 2000 (age 26)	-	59	125
Kirsten de Wit	16 March 2004 (age 22)	-	59	147
Selena Piek	30 September 1991 (age 34)	-	-	16
Kelly van Buiten	15 April 2002 (age 24)	-	196	112

=== Previous squads ===
==== Thomas Cup ====
- 2020

==== Uber Cup ====
- 2008, 2012

==== Sudirman Cup ====
- 2019
