= Helvetia Cup =

International badminton competition

- Formerly: Nations Cup
- Sport: Badminton
- Founded: 1962
- Founder: Hans Peter Kunz
- Folded: 2007
- Countries: EBU member nations
- Confederation: European Badminton Union
- Most titles: West Germany (12 titles)

The Helvetia Cup or European B-Team Championships was a European mixed team championship in badminton. The first Helvetia Cup tournament took place in Zurich, Switzerland in 1962, when it was still known as the Nations Cup (German: Nationen Cup im Badminton). The tournament took place every two years from 1971 until 2007, after which it was dissolved.

== History ==
Prior to the creation of the European Mixed Team Badminton Championships in 1972, excluding the Thomas and Uber Cup European qualifiers, there was no official team event that gathered teams from Europe to compete. In 1962, the former president of the Swiss Badminton Union, Hans Peter Kunz envisioned a tournament titled the Six Nations Cup to gather national teams across Europe to complete in the tournament as well as to strengthen the overall popularity of badminton in the region. Kunz invited teams from Austria, Belgium, France, the Netherlands and West Germany to compete in the inaugural edition of the championships, with France subsequently withdrawing from the tournament.

The first eight years of the championships saw participation grow from six teams to eight teams with the arrival of debuting teams including Czechoslovakia, Finland, Norway and Wales. From the mid-1980s onwards, the tournament served as the qualifying rounds for the European Mixed Team Badminton Championships. In 2007, the tournament was scrapped, making the 2007 Helvetia Cup the last edition of the tournament.

== Format ==
=== 1962–1970: Group stages and knockout elimination ===
For the first six editions of the Helvetia Cup, teams are divided into two groups and competed in the group stages play in a round-robin format to determine their ranks in their specific group. The teams are then drawn to face teams in the same position in the other group in a single-round elimination to determine their final rankings.

In 1968, the elimination rounds were changed to a knockout format where the top two teams in each group advanced to the last four knockout stages while the remaining teams in the group competed in the classification rounds.

=== 1971–1999: League system ===
Following the arrival of new teams in 1971, the format was changed into a league system format where teams are drawn into groups based on their performances in the group stages. Teams that top their group will advance to the final round which was played in a round-robin format while the remaining teams are relegated to compete in a round-robin classification round.

=== 2001–2007: Return of the knockout system ===
The league format was reverted into the knockout stage format in the 2001 Helvetia Cup and became the main format used for the next few tournaments.

== Results ==
=== Past winners ===
Year	Host	Final			Third place playoff			Number of teams
Year	Host	Winners	Score	Runners-up	Third place	Score	Fourth place	Number of teams
1962	Zürich, Switzerland	West Germany	8–0	Netherlands	Austria	7–1	Belgium	6
1963	Munich, Germany	West Germany	7–1	Austria	Belgium	4–4 (10–9)	Netherlands	5
1964	Haarlem, Netherlands	West Germany	7–1	Belgium	Netherlands	5–3	Austria	5
1965	Graz, Austria	West Germany	8–0	Netherlands	Austria	4–4 (11–8)	Belgium	6
1966	Brussels, Belgium	West Germany	8–0	Netherlands	Austria	5–3	Belgium	6
1967	Lausanne, Switzerland	West Germany	7–1	Netherlands	Austria	7–1	Belgium	6
1968	Oslo, Norway	West Germany	5–2	Norway	Netherlands	6–1	Austria	8
1969	Prague, Czechoslovakia	West Germany	4–3	Netherlands	Austria	6–1	Czechoslovakia	8
1970	Neuss, Germany	West Germany	4–3	Netherlands	Wales	4–3	Norway	8
1971	Heerlen, Netherlands	West Germany	round-robin	Netherlands	Belgium	round-robin	Austria	9
1973	Graz, Austria	Czechoslovakia	round-robin	Norway	Austria	round-robin	Yugoslavia	9
1975	Antwerp, Belgium	Norway	round-robin	Yugoslavia	Austria	round-robin	Ireland	9
1977	Leningrad, Soviet Union	Soviet Union	round-robin	Ireland	East Germany	round-robin	Czechoslovakia	11
1979	Klagenfurt, Austria	Soviet Union	round-robin	Ireland	Norway	round-robin	Wales	17
1981	Sandefjord, Norway	Ireland	round-robin	Norway	Wales	round-robin	Poland	9
1983	Basel, Switzerland	West Germany	round-robin	Wales	Ireland	round-robin	Austria	12
1985	Warsaw, Poland	Netherlands	round-robin	Wales	Poland	round-robin	Belgium	13
1987	Belfast, Northern Ireland	West Germany	round-robin	Wales	Ireland	round-robin	Austria	14
1989	Budapest, Hungary	Poland	round-robin	Finland	Ireland	round-robin	Wales	15
1991	Varna, Bulgaria	Poland	round-robin	Ireland	Austria	round-robin	Wales	12
1993	Pressbaum, Austria	Austria	round-robin	Poland	Ireland	round-robin	Ukraine	20
1995	Nicosia, Cyprus	Ukraine	round-robin	Bulgaria	Ireland	round-robin	Switzerland	15
1997	Strasbourg, France	France	round-robin	Portugal	Switzerland	round-robin	Spain	19
1999	Lisburn, Northern Ireland	Iceland	round-robin	Poland	Portugal	round-robin	Spain	13
2001	Most, Czech Republic	Spain	3–2	Portugal	Czech Republic	5–0	Slovenia	19
2003	Caldas da Rainha, Portugal	France	3–1	Slovenia	Czech Republic	3–1	Portugal	19
2005	Agros, Cyprus	Czech Republic	3–2	Spain	Portugal	3–2	Belgium	20
2007	Reykjavík, Iceland	Iceland	3–2	(Republic of Ireland); Ireland	Estonia	3–2	Switzerland	16

=== Teams that have reached the top four ===
The list below shows the teams that have placed fourth or higher in the history of the Helvetia Cup. West Germany tops the list with 12 titles, winning every Helvetia Cup the team has participated in. The list is followed by Poland, France, Iceland and the Soviet Union with two titles each. The Netherlands are the team with the most runners-up finishes in the Helvetia Cup, coming second to West Germany in every edition where the team reached the final two.

Team	Champions	Runners-up	Third place	Fourth place	Top 4 total
West Germany	12 (1962, 1963, 1964, 1965, 1966, 1967, 1968, 1969, 1970, 1971, 1983, 1987)	—N/a	—N/a	—N/a	12
Poland	2 (1989, 1991)	3 (1993, 1999, 2005)	1 (1985)	1 (1981)	7
France	2 (1997, 2003)	—N/a	1 (1993)	—N/a	3
Iceland	2 (1999, 2007)	—N/a	—N/a	—N/a	2
Soviet Union	2 (1977, 1979)	—N/a	—N/a	—N/a	2
Netherlands	1 (1985)	7 (1962, 1965, 1966, 1967, 1969, 1970, 1971)	2 (1964, 1968)	1 (1963)	12
Ireland	1 (1981)	4 (1977, 1979, 1991, 2007)	5 (1983, 1987, 1989, 1993, 1995)	1 (1975)	11
Norway	1 (1975)	3 (1968, 1973, 1981)	1 (1979)	1 (1970)	6
Austria	1 (1993)	1 (1963)	10 (1962, 1965, 1966, 1967, 1969, 1971, 1973, 1975, 1983, 1991)	4 (1964, 1968, 1983, 1987)	16
Spain	1 (2001)	1 (2005)	—N/a	2 (1997, 1999)	4
Czechoslovakia	1 (1973)	—N/a	—N/a	2 (1969, 1977)	3
Czech Republic	1 (2005)	—N/a	2 (2001, 2003)	—N/a	3
Ukraine	1 (1995)	—N/a	—N/a	1 (1993)	2
Wales	—N/a	4 (1983, 1985, 1987)	2 (1970, 1981)	4 (1979, 1989, 1991)	10
Portugal	—N/a	2 (1997, 2001)	2 (1999, 2005)	1 (2003)	5
Belgium	—N/a	1 (1964)	2 (1963, 1971)	6 (1962, 1965, 1966, 1967, 1985, 2005)	9
Slovenia	—N/a	1 (2003)	—N/a	1 (2001)	2
Yugoslavia	—N/a	1 (1975)	—N/a	1 (1973)	2
Bulgaria	—N/a	1 (1995)	—N/a	—N/a	1
Finland	—N/a	1 (1989)	—N/a	—N/a	1
Switzerland	—N/a	—N/a	1 (1997)	2 (1995, 2007)	3
East Germany	—N/a	—N/a	1 (1977)	—N/a	1
Estonia	—N/a	—N/a	1 (2007)	—N/a	1
