= 1970 Helvetia Cup =

Badminton event

1970 Helvetia Cup Helvetia-Cup 1970
Tournament details
- Dates: 25 – 26 April
- Edition: 9
- Venue: Stadionhalle
- Location: Neuss, West Germany

The 1970 Helvetia Cup was the ninth edition of the Helvetia Cup mixed team badminton tournament. This was the second time West Germany has hosted the event.

Hosts West Germany won their ninth consecutive title by defeating the Netherlands 4–3 in the final. In the playoff for third place, Wales defeated Norway 4–3. In the classification round, Czechoslovakia defeated Austria 5–2 for fifth place while Switzerland defeated Finland for seventh place.

== Tournament ==
The 1970 Helvetia Cup was scheduled to be held from 25 to 26 April 1970 with eight countries participating in the event.

=== Venue ===
This tournament was held at the Stadionhalle in Neuss, West Germany.

=== Draw ===
The draw was announced on 5 April 1970. The group stage consists of 2 groups, Group A and Group B.

Group A	Group B
Czechoslovakia; Netherlands; Switzerland; Wales	Austria; Finland; West Germany; Norway

== Group stage ==
All times are Central European Time (UTC+01:00).

=== Group A ===
Pos	Team	Pld	W	L	MF	MA	MD	Pts	Qualification
1	Netherlands	3	3	0	18	3	+15	3	Final
2	Wales	3	2	1	13	8	+5	2	3rd–4th place
3	Czechoslovakia	3	1	2	11	10	+1	1	5th–6th place
4	Switzerland	3	0	3	1	20	−19	0	7th–8th place

Source: e-newspaperarchives.ch

25 April 1970

Netherlands	7–0	Czechoslovakia
Report

Stadionhalle, West Germany

25 April 1970

Wales	5–2	Switzerland
Report

Stadionhalle, West Germany

25 April 1970

Netherlands	7–0	Wales
Report

Stadionhalle, West Germany

25 April 1970

Czechoslovakia	6–1	Switzerland
Report

Stadionhalle, West Germany

25 April 1970

Netherlands	7–0	Switzerland
Report

Bygdøhus Arena, Norway

25 April 1970

Czechoslovakia	3–4	Wales
Report

Bygdøhus Arena, Norway

=== Group B ===
Pos	Team	Pld	W	L	MF	MA	MD	Pts	Qualification
1	West Germany (H)	3	3	0	20	1	+19	3	Final
2	Norway	3	2	1	15	6	+9	2	3rd–4th place
3	Austria	3	1	2	4	17	−13	1	5th–6th place
4	Finland	3	0	3	3	18	−15	0	7th–8th place

Source: e-newspaperarchives.ch
(H) Host

25 April 1970

West Germany	6–1	Austria
Report

Stadionhalle, West Germany

25 April 1970

Norway	7–0	Finland
Report

Stadionhalle, West Germany

25 April 1970

West Germany	7–0	Norway
Report

Stadionhalle, West Germany

25 April 1970

Austria	7–0	Finland
Report

Stadionhalle, West Germany

25 April 1970

West Germany	7–0	Finland
Report

Stadionhalle, West Germany

25 April 1970

Austria	3–4	Norway
Report

Stadionhalle, West Germany

== Classification round ==
=== 7th–8th place ===
26 April 1970

Finland	2–5	Switzerland
Report

Stadionhalle, West Germany

=== 5th–6th place ===
26 April 1970

Austria	2–5	Czechoslovakia
Report

Stadionhalle, West Germany

=== 3rd–4th place ===
26 April 1970

Norway	3–4	Wales
Report

Stadionhalle, West Germany

=== Final ===
==== West Germany vs Netherlands ====
West Germany
4
Stadionhalle
26 April 1970

Netherlands
3

			1	2	3
1	(West Germany) (Netherlands)	Torsten Winter; Ruud van Ginneken	15; 11	15; 10
2	(West Germany) (Netherlands)	Gerhard Kucki; Huub van Ginneken	12; 15	15; 11	17; 16
3	(West Germany) (Netherlands)	Jürgen Stock; Ad Verhoef	18; 14	15; 5
4	(West Germany) (Netherlands)	Karin Dittberner / Karin Schäfers; Felice de Nooyer / Joke van Beusekom	1; 15	4; 15
5	(West Germany) (Netherlands)	Karl-Heinz Garbers / Torsten Winter; Huub van Ginneken / Ad Verhoef	15; 2	15; 8
6	(West Germany) (Netherlands)	Karin Schäfers; Joke van Beusekom	6; 11	7; 1
7	(West Germany) (Netherlands)	Gerhard Kucki / Karin Dittberner; Ruud van Ginneken / Felice de Nooyer	15; 11	3; 15	17; 18

1970 Helvetia Cup winner

West Germany
Eighth title

== Final ranking ==
Pos	Team	Pld	W	L	Pts	MD	Final result
1st place, gold medalist(s)	West Germany (H)	4	4	0	4	+20	Champions
2nd place, silver medalist(s)	Netherlands	4	3	1	3	+16	Runners-up
3rd place, bronze medalist(s)	Wales	4	3	1	3	+6	Third place
4	Norway	4	2	2	2	+8	Fourth place
5	Czechoslovakia	4	2	2	2	+4	Fifth place
6	Austria	4	1	3	1	−16	Sixth place
7	Switzerland	4	1	3	1	−16	Seventh place
8	Finland	4	0	4	0	−18	Eighth place
