= Badminton Nederland =

Netherlands' governing body for badminton

- Formation: 1931
- Type: National Sport Association
- Headquarters: Nieuwegein, Utrecht
- President: Michel Bezuijen
- Affiliations: BE, BWF
- Website: www.badminton.nl

Badminton Netherlands (Dutch: Badminton Nederland) is the national governing body for the sport of badminton in the Netherlands. As of February 2019, there are around 35,000 registered players and 503 clubs across the country. The association was divided into seven regions, namely Noord (North), Noord-Holland (North Holland), Zuid-West (Southwest), Zentrum (Central), Oost (East), Noord-Brabant (North Brabant), and Limburg (Limburg).

== History ==
Originally founded on 15 November 1931 as the Dutch Badminton Association (Dutch: Nederlandse Badminton Bond, NBB) in Noordwijk by the pioneers of Dutch badminton including Dirk Stikker. It later became one of the founding members of International Badminton Federation and Badminton Europe. As a hope to gain more exposure, the association was rebranded with a new logo and renamed as Badminton Nederland starting from 30 January 2010.

== Tournaments ==
- Dutch Open, part of BWF Tour Super 100.
- Dutch International
- Dutch Junior International
- Dutch National Badminton Championships
