= 1971 Helvetia Cup =

Badminton event

1971 Helvetia Cup Helvetia-Beker 1971
Tournament details
- Dates: 24 – 25 April
- Edition: 10
- Venue: Sporthal Varenbeuk
- Location: Heerlen, Netherlands

The 1971 Helvetia Cup was the tenth edition of the Helvetia Cup mixed team badminton tournament. This was the second time the Netherlands have hosted the tournament. West Germany emerged as champions for the tenth time after defeating the Netherlands and Belgium in the final stage.

== Tournament ==
The 1971 Helvetia Cup was scheduled to be held from 24 to 25 April 1971 with nine countries participating in the tournament. Due to the increasing amount of participating teams, a new competition format was used in the tournament, with nine teams divided into groups of three.

=== Venue ===
This tournament was held at Sporthal Varenbeuk in Heerlen, Netherlands.

=== Draw ===
The draw was announced on 23 April 1971. The group stage consists of 3 groups, Group 1, Group 2 and Group 3.

Group 1	Group 2	Group 3
Finland; Czechoslovakia; Netherlands	Austria; West Germany; Norway	Belgium; Switzerland; Wales

== Group stage ==
All times are Central European Time (UTC+01:00).

=== Group 1 ===
Pos	Team	Pld	W	L	MF	MA	MD	Pts	Qualification
1	Netherlands (H)	2	2	0	12	2	+10	2	Final
2	Finland	2	1	1	7	7	0	1	4th–6th place
3	Czechoslovakia	2	0	2	2	12	−10	0	7th–9th place

Source: e-newspaperarchives.ch
(H) Host

24 April 1971

Netherlands	5–2	Finland
Report

Sporthal Varenbeuk, Netherlands

24 April 1971

Czechoslovakia	2–5	Finland
Report

Sporthal Varenbeuk, Netherlands

24 April 1971

Netherlands	7–0	Czechoslovakia
Report

Sporthal Varenbeuk, Netherlands

=== Group 2 ===
Pos	Team	Pld	W	L	MF	MA	MD	Pts	Qualification
1	West Germany	2	2	0	14	0	+14	2	Final
2	Austria	2	1	1	6	8	−2	1	4th–6th place
3	Norway	2	0	2	1	13	−12	0	7th–9th place

Source: e-newspaperarchives.ch

24 April 1971

West Germany	7–0	Norway
Report

Sporthal Varenbeuk, Netherlands

24 April 1971

Austria	6–1	Norway
Report

Sporthal Varenbeuk, Netherlands

24 April 1971

West Germany	7–0	Austria
Report

Sporthal Varenbeuk, Netherlands

=== Group 3 ===
Pos	Team	Pld	W	L	MF	MA	MD	Pts	Qualification
1	Belgium	2	2	0	9	5	+4	2	Final
2	Switzerland	2	1	1	6	8	−2	1	4th–6th place
3	Wales	2	0	2	6	8	−2	0	7th–9th place

Source: e-newspaperarchives.ch

24 April 1971

Belgium	5–2	Switzerland
Report

Sporthal Varenbeuk, Netherlands

24 April 1971

Wales	3–4	Switzerland
Report

Sporthal Varenbeuk, Netherlands

24 April 1971

Belgium	4–3	Wales
Report

Sporthal Varenbeuk, Netherlands

== Classification round ==
=== 7th–9th place ===
Pos	Team	Pld	W	L	MF	MA	MD	Pts	Qualification
1	Czechoslovakia	2	2	0	9	5	+4	2	Seventh place
2	Wales	2	1	1	7	7	0	1	Eighth place
3	Norway	2	0	2	5	9	−4	0	Ninth place

Source: e-newspaperarchives.ch

25 April 1971

Czechoslovakia	5–2	Wales
Report

Sporthal Varenbeuk, Netherlands

25 April 1971

Norway	2–5	Wales
Report

Sporthal Varenbeuk, Netherlands

25 April 1971

Czechoslovakia	4–3	Norway
Report

Sporthal Varenbeuk, Netherlands

=== 4th–6th place ===
Pos	Team	Pld	W	L	MF	MA	MD	Pts	Qualification
1	Austria	2	2	0	12	2	+10	2	Fourth place
2	Finland	2	1	1	8	6	+2	1	Fifth place
3	Switzerland	2	0	2	1	13	−12	0	Sixth place

Source: e-newspaperarchives.ch

25 April 1971

Austria	7–0	Switzerland
Report

Sporthal Varenbeuk, Netherlands

25 April 1971

Finland	6–1	Switzerland
Report

Sporthal Varenbeuk, Netherlands

25 April 1971

Austria	5–2	Finland
Report

Sporthal Varenbeuk, Netherlands

== Final ==
=== Round robin ===
Pos	Team	Pld	W	L	MF	MA	MD	Pts	Qualification
1	West Germany	2	2	0	11	3	+8	2	Champions
2	Netherlands (H)	2	1	1	6	8	−2	1	Runners-up
3	Belgium	2	0	2	4	10	−6	0	Third place

Source: newspaperarchives.ch
(H) Host

25 April 1971

West Germany	6–1	Belgium
Report

Sporthal Varenbeuk, Netherlands

25 April 1971

Netherlands	4–3	Belgium
Report

Sporthal Varenbeuk, Netherlands

25 April 1971

West Germany	5–2	Netherlands
Report

Sporthal Varenbeuk, Netherlands

1971 Helvetia Cup winner

West Germany
Tenth title

== Final ranking ==
Pos	Team	Pld	W	L	Pts	MD	Final result
1st place, gold medalist(s)	West Germany (H)	4	4	0	4	+22	Champions
2nd place, silver medalist(s)	Netherlands	4	3	1	3	+8	Runners-up
3rd place, bronze medalist(s)	Belgium	4	2	2	2	−2	Third place
4	Austria	4	3	1	3	+8	Fourth place
5	Finland	4	2	2	2	+2	Fifth place
6	Switzerland	4	1	3	1	−14	Sixth place
7	Czechoslovakia	4	2	2	2	−6	Seventh place
8	Wales	4	1	3	1	−2	Eighth place
9	Norway	4	0	4	0	−16	Ninth place
