= 1968 Helvetia Cup =

Badminton event

1968 Helvetia Cup Helvetia Cup 1968
Tournament details
- Dates: 27 – 28 April
- Edition: 7
- Venue: Bygdøhus Arena
- Location: Oslo, Norway

The 1968 Helvetia Cup was the seventh edition of the Helvetia Cup mixed team badminton tournament. In October 1967, the Norwegian Badminton Federation announced that the next two Helvetia Cup tournaments would be held in Oslo and Prague.

West Germany won their seventh consecutive title by defeating hosts Norway 5–2 in the final. In the playoff for third place, the Netherlands defeated Austria 6–1. In the classification round, Belgium defeated Finland 4–3 for fifth place while Switzerland defeated Czechoslovakia for seventh place.

== Tournament ==
The 1968 Helvetia Cup was scheduled to be held from 27 to 28 April 1968. Two new participating nations entered the competition, which were Finland and Czechoslovakia.

=== Venue ===
This tournament was held at the Bygdøhus Arena in Oslo, Norway.

=== Draw ===
The draw was announced on 25 April 1968. The group stage consists of 2 groups, Group A and Group B.

Group A	Group B
Belgium; West Germany; Norway; Switzerland	Austria; Czechoslovakia; Finland; Netherlands

== Group stage ==
All times are Central European Time (UTC+01:00).

=== Group A ===
Pos	Team	Pld	W	L	MF	MA	MD	Pts	Qualification
1	West Germany	3	3	0	18	3	+15	3	Knockout stage
2	Norway (H)	3	2	1	13	8	+5	2	Knockout stage
3	Belgium	3	1	2	11	10	+1	1	Classification round
4	Switzerland	3	0	3	1	20	−19	0	Classification round

Source: e-newspaperarchives.ch
(H) Host

27 April 1968

West Germany	7–0	Switzerland
Report

Bygdøhus Arena, Norway

27 April 1968

Belgium	3–4	Norway
Report

Bygdøhus Arena, Norway

27 April 1968

West Germany	5–2	Norway
Report

Bygdøhus Arena, Norway

27 April 1968

Belgium	6–1	Switzerland
Report

Bygdøhus Arena, Norway

27 April 1968

West Germany	5–2	Belgium
Report

Bygdøhus Arena, Norway

27 April 1968

Norway	7–0	Switzerland
Report

Bygdøhus Arena, Norway

=== Group B ===
Pos	Team	Pld	W	L	MF	MA	MD	Pts	Qualification
1	Netherlands	3	3	0	20	1	+19	3	Knockout stage
2	Austria	3	2	1	15	6	+9	2	Knockout stage
3	Finland	3	1	2	4	17	−13	1	Classification round
4	Czechoslovakia	3	0	3	3	18	−15	0	Classification round

Source: Delpher

27 April 1968

Netherlands	7–0	Finland
Report

Bygdøhus Arena, Norway

27 April 1968

Austria	7–0	Czechoslovakia
Report

Bygdøhus Arena, Norway

27 April 1968

Netherlands	6–1	Austria
Report

Bygdøhus Arena, Norway

27 April 1968

Finland	4–3	Czechoslovakia
Report

Bygdøhus Arena, Norway

27 April 1968

Netherlands	7–0	Czechoslovakia
Report

Bygdøhus Arena, Norway

27 April 1968

Austria	7–0	Finland
Report

Bygdøhus Arena, Norway

== Classification round ==
=== 7th–8th place ===
28 April 1968

Switzerland	4–3	Czechoslovakia
Report

Bygdøhus Arena, Norway

=== 5th–6th place ===
28 April 1968

Belgium	4–3	Finland
Report

Bygdøhus Arena, Norway

== Knockout stage ==
=== Bracket ===
Semi-finals
27 April
West Germany	5
Austria	2
27 April
Norway	4
Netherlands	3

Final
28 April
West Germany	5
Norway	2
Third place play-off
28 April
Netherlands	6
Austria	1

=== Final ===
==== West Germany vs Norway ====
West Germany
5
Bygdøhus Arena
28 April 1967

Norway
2

			1	2	3
1	(West Germany) (Norway)	Karl-Heinz Garbers; Harald Nettli	8; 15	8; 15
2	(West Germany) (Norway)	Heinz Wossowski; Hans Sperre	15; 11	10; 15	12; 15
3	(West Germany) (Norway)	Gerhard Kucki; Arne Hagene	15; 10	15; 2
4	(West Germany) (Norway)	Gerda Schumacher; Ragnhild Holand	11; 5	11; 2
5	(West Germany) (Norway)	Gerhard Kucki / Roland Maywald; Harald Nettli / Hans Sperre	15; 11	15; 5
6	(West Germany) (Norway)	Gerda Schumacher / Gudrun Ziebold; Elisabeth Eide / Randi Gulbrandsen	15; 3	15; 3
7	(West Germany) (Norway)	Roland Maywald / Gudrun Ziebold; Jan Holtnæs / Elisabeth Eide	15; 5	15; 5

1968 Helvetia Cup winner

West Germany
Seventh title

== Final ranking ==
Pos	Team	Pld	W	L	Pts	MD	Final result
1st place, gold medalist(s)	West Germany	5	4	0	5	+21	Champions
2nd place, silver medalist(s)	Norway (H)	5	3	2	3	+3	Runners-up
3rd place, bronze medalist(s)	Netherlands	5	4	1	4	+23	Third place
4	Austria	5	2	3	2	+1	Fourth place
5	Belgium	4	2	2	2	+2	Fifth place
6	Finland	4	1	3	1	−14	Sixth place
7	Switzerland	4	1	3	1	−18	Seventh place
8	Czechoslovakia	4	0	4	0	−16	Eighth place
