= German Badminton Association =

German governing body for badminton

German Badminton Association Deutscher Badminton-Verband
- Formation: 18 January 1953
- Type: National Sport Association
- Headquarters: Mülheim, Nordrhein-Westfalen
- President: Ralf Michaelis
- Affiliations: BEC, BWF
- Website: badminton.de

German Badminton Association (DBV, German: Deutscher Badminton-Verband) is the national governing body for the sport of badminton in Germany. The association consists of state badminton associations from 16 states of Germany.

== History ==
The association was founded in 1953 by representatives of 14 West German badminton clubs during the first German National Badminton Championships held in Wiesbaden. It is also the founding members of Badminton Europe in 1967. As West Germany and East Germany reunified, the East German Badminton Federation (Deutscher Federball-Verband/DFV) also merged with DBV in 1991.

== Tournaments ==
- German Open, an annual open tournament that attracts the world's elite players.
- SaarLorLux Open (known as Bitburger Open until 2017), an annual tournament held in Saarbrücken since 1988.
- German Junior
- Badminton Bundesliga
