= 2005 Helvetia Cup =

The 2005 Helvetia Cup or 2005 European B Team Championships in badminton was held from January 19 to January 23 in Agros, Cyprus. The tournament took place in Glafkos Klerides sport center and attracted the attention of many locals from the surrounding region. It was the first time such a tournament took place in Agros village and its surrounding. After the tournament, two local badminton clubs were created by the locals in Agros and Kyperounta.

== Final classification table ==
Pos	Country
1	Czech Republic
2	Spain
3	Portugal
4	Belgium
5	Iceland
6	Norway
7	Estonia
8	Belarus
9	Switzerland
10	Austria

Pos	Country
11	(Republic of Ireland) Ireland
12	Croatia
13	Romania
14	Hungary
15	Cyprus
16	Luxembourg
17	Turkey
18	Greece
19	Italy
20	Israel

Helvetia Cup Winner

Czech Republic
Second title
