= Czechoslovakia national badminton team =

Former national badminton team representing Czechoslovakia

Czechoslovakia
- Association: Československý Badmintonový Svaz (ČSBS)
- Confederation: BE (Europe)

Sudirman Cup
- Appearances: 1 (first in 1991)
- Best result: Group stage

European Mixed Team Championships
- Appearances: 9 (first in 1972)
- Best result: Group stage

Helvetia Cup
- Appearances: 11 (first in 1968)
- Best result: Champions (1973)

The Czechoslovakia national badminton team (Czechoslovak: Československá reprezentácia v bedmintone) represented Czechoslovakia in international badminton team competitions. The Czechoslovakian team competed in the 1991 Sudirman Cup before the nation was split into the Czech Republic and Slovakia. It was controlled by the Czechoslovak Badminton Association (Czechoslovak: Československý Bedmintonový Sväz).

The Czechoslovakian team also once competed in the Helvetia Cup. Czechoslovakia won the tournament once in 1973.

== Competitive record ==
=== Thomas Cup ===
Year	Result
(England) 1949 to (Malaysia) 1988	Did not enter
(Japan) 1990	Did not qualify
(Malaysia) 1992	Did not qualify

=== Uber Cup ===
Year	Result
(England) 1957 to (Malaysia) 1988	Did not enter
(Japan) 1990	Did not qualify
(Malaysia) 1992	Did not qualify

=== Sudirman Cup ===
Year	Result
(Indonesia) 1989	Did not enter
(Denmark) 1991	27th - Group 7 Promoted

=== European Team Championships ===
==== Mixed team ====
Year	Result
(Sweden) 1972	9th place
(Austria) 1974	9th place
(Republic of Ireland) 1976	Did not enter
(England) 1978	Did not enter
(Netherlands) 1980	13th place
(West Germany) 1982	9th place
(England) 1984	13th place
(Sweden) 1986	14th place
(Norway) 1988	16th place
(Soviet Union) 1990	16th place
(Scotland) 1992	16th place

=== Helvetia Cup ===
Year	Result
(Switzerland) 1962 to (Switzerland) 1967	Did not enter
(Norway) 1968	8th place
(Czechoslovakia) 1969	Fourth place
(Germany) 1970	6th place
(Netherlands) 1971	7th place
(Austria) 1973	(gold) Winner
(Belgium) 1975	Did not enter
(Soviet Union) 1977	Fourth place
(Austria) 1979	5th place
(Norway) 1981	Did not enter
(Switzerland) 1983	5th place
(Poland) 1985	5th place
(Northern Ireland) 1987	Did not enter
(Hungary) 1989	9th place
(Bulgaria) 1991	8th place

== Junior competitive record ==
=== European Junior Team Championships ===
==== Mixed team ====
Year	Result
(Denmark) 1975	Did not enter
(Malta) 1977	Did not enter
(West Germany) 1979	10th place
(Scotland) 1981	Did not enter
(Finland) 1983	Did not enter
(Austria) 1985	18th place
(Poland) 1987	Did not enter
(England) 1989	Did not enter
(Hungary) 1991	22nd place

=== Finlandia Cup ===
Year	Result
(Switzerland) 1984 to (Wales) 1988	Did not enter
(Austria) 1990	14th place
(Czechoslovakia) 1992	14th place

== Players ==
=== Squad ===
As of 1993

==== Men's team ====
Name	DoB/Age	Ranking of event		
Name	DoB/Age	MS	MD	XD
Tomasz Mendrek	9 August 1968 (aged 24)	-	-	-
Jan Jurka	17 February 1970 (aged 22)	-	-	-
Radek Gregor	18 April 1970 (aged 22)	-	-	-
Daniel Gaspar	19 May 1972 (aged 20)	-	-	-
Jiří Dufek	9 September 1963 (aged 29)	-	-	-

==== Women's team ====
Name	DoB/Age	Ranking of event		
Name	DoB/Age	WS	WD	XD
Eva Lacinová	3 October 1971 (aged 21)	-	-	-
Ludmila Bášová	23 April 1968 (aged 24)	-	-	-
Alena Horáková	6 May 1961 (aged 31)	-	-	-
Adela Zimmerová	11 April 1964 (aged 28)	-	-	-
Jitka Lacinová	10 April 1969 (aged 23)	-	-	-
