= 1965 Helvetia Cup =

Badminton event

1965 Helvetia Cup Helvetia-Cup 1965
Tournament details
- Dates: 24 – 25 April
- Edition: 4
- Venue: Graz Badminton Centre
- Location: Graz, Austria

The 1964 Helvetia Cup was the fourth edition of the Helvetia Cup mixed team badminton tournament. This was the first edition of the Helvetia Cup to be held in Austria.

Defending champions West Germany won the title for the fourth time by defeating the Netherlands 8–0 in the final. In the playoff for third place, Austria drew 4–4 with Belgium but won third place by game difference. In the playoffs for fifth place, Norway defeated Switzerland 7–1.

== Tournament ==
The 1964 Helvetia Cup was scheduled to be held from 24 to 25 April 1964 with the participation of six countries which were Austria, Belgium, the Netherlands, Switzerland, West Germany and debutants Norway.

=== Venue ===
This tournament was held at the Graz Badminton Centre in Graz, Austria.

=== Draw ===
The draw was announced on 23 April 1965. The group stage consists of 2 groups, Group 1 and Group 2.

| Group 1 | Group 2 |
|---|---|
| West Germany; Austria; Switzerland | Belgium; Netherlands; Norway |

== Group stage ==
All times are Central European Time (UTC+01:00).

=== Group 1 ===
| Pos | Team | Pld | W | L | MF | MA | MD | Pts | Qualification |
|---|---|---|---|---|---|---|---|---|---|
| 1 | West Germany | 2 | 2 | 0 | 16 | 0 | +16 | 2 | Final |
| 2 | Austria (H) | 2 | 1 | 1 | 8 | 8 | 0 | 1 | 3rd–4th place |
| 3 | Switzerland | 2 | 0 | 2 | 0 | 16 | −16 | 0 | 5th–6th place |

Source: e-newspaperarchives.ch
(H) Host

24 April 1965

| West Germany | 8–0 | Austria |
Report

Graz Badminton Centre, Austria

24 April 1965

| West Germany | 8–0 | Switzerland |
Report

Graz Badminton Centre, Austria

24 April 1965

| Austria | 8–0 | Switzerland |
Report

Graz Badminton Centre, Austria

=== Group 2 ===
| Pos | Team | Pld | W | L | MF | MA | MD | Pts | Qualification |
|---|---|---|---|---|---|---|---|---|---|
| 1 | Netherlands | 2 | 2 | 0 | 10 | 6 | +4 | 2 | Final |
| 2 | Belgium | 2 | 1 | 1 | 9 | 7 | +2 | 1 | 3rd–4th place |
| 3 | Norway | 2 | 0 | 2 | 5 | 11 | −6 | 0 | 5th–6th place |

Source: National Library of Norway

24 April 1965

| Netherlands | 4–4 | Belgium |
Report

Graz Badminton Centre, Austria

24 April 1965

| Netherlands | 6–2 | Norway |
Report

Graz Badminton Centre, Austria

24 April 1965

| Belgium | 5–3 | Norway |
Report

Graz Badminton Centre, Austria

== Classification round ==
=== 5th–6th place ===
25 April 1965

| Switzerland | 1–7 | Norway |
Report

Graz Badminton Centre, Austria

=== 3rd–4th place ===
25 April 1965

| Austria* | 4–4 (11–8) | Belgium |
Report

Graz Badminton Centre, Austria

* : Austria won by game difference.

=== Final ===
25 April 1965

| West Germany | 8–0 | Netherlands |
Report

Graz Badminton Centre, Austria

1965 Helvetia Cup winner

West Germany
Fourth title

== Final ranking ==
| Pos | Team | Pld | W | L | Pts | MD | Final result |
|---|---|---|---|---|---|---|---|
| 1st place, gold medalist(s) | West Germany | 3 | 3 | 0 | 3 | +24 | Champions |
| 2nd place, silver medalist(s) | Netherlands | 3 | 1 | 1 | 2 | −4 | Runners-up |
| 3rd place, bronze medalist(s) | Austria (H) | 3 | 2 | 1 | 2 | 0 | Third place |
| 4 | Belgium | 3 | 1 | 1 | 1 | +2 | Fourth place |
| 5 | Norway | 3 | 1 | 2 | 1 | −8 | Fifth place |
| 6 | Switzerland | 3 | 0 | 3 | 0 | −22 | Sixth place |
