= 2007 Helvetia Cup =

The 2007 Helvetia Cup or 2007 European B Team Championships in badminton was held from January 17 to January 21 in Reykjavík, Iceland.

The three better teams of the competition won promotion to the top group.

== Venue ==
- Laugardalur Sports Centre

== Group stages ==
=== Group 1 ===
Team	Pts	Pld	MF	MA	MD
Iceland	3	3	11	4	+7
Portugal	2	3	9	6	+3
Italy	1	3	6	9	–3
Croatia	0	3	4	11	–7

=== Group 2 ===
Team	Pts	Pld	MF	MA	MD
(Republic of Ireland) Ireland	3	3	12	3	+9
Spain	2	3	10	5	+5
Norway	1	3	4	11	–7
Cyprus	0	3	4	11	–7

=== Group 3 ===
Team	Pts	Pld	MF	MA	MD
Estonia	3	3	10	5	+5
Belgium	2	3	10	5	+5
Austria	1	3	9	6	+3
Israel	0	3	1	14	–13

=== Group 4 ===
Team	Pts	Pld	MF	MA	MD
Switzerland	3	3	12	3	+9
Romania	2	3	9	6	+3
Luxembourg	1	3	3	12	–9
Wales	0	3	6	9	–3

== Knockout stages ==
=== Top four ===
Semifinals
Iceland	3
Switzerland	2
Estonia	2
Ireland	3

Final
Iceland	3
Ireland	2
Third place
Switzerland	2
Estonia	3

== Final classification table ==
Pos	Country
1	Iceland
2	(Republic of Ireland) Ireland
3	Estonia
4	Switzerland
5	Portugal
6	Spain
7	Romania
8	Belgium
9	Austria
10	Norway
11	Italy
12	Luxembourg
13	Wales
14	Croatia
15	Cyprus
16	Israel

Helvetia Cup Winner
Iceland
Second title
