= Finland national badminton team =

National badminton team representing Finland

Finland
- Association: Suomen Sulkapalloliitto (SS)
- Confederation: BE (Europe)
- President: Tytti Saarinen

BWF ranking
- Current ranking: 42 ▲1 (2 January 2024)
- Highest ranking: 21 (6 April 2017)

Sudirman Cup
- Appearances: 11 (first in 1989)
- Best result: Group stage

Thomas Cup
- Appearances: 2 (first in 1994)
- Best result: Group stage

European Mixed Team Championships
- Appearances: 20 (first in 1972)
- Best result: Quarter-finals (2002)

European Men's Team Championships
- Appearances: 7 (first in 2006)
- Best result: Semi-finals (2014)

European Women's Team Championships
- Appearances: 6 (first in 2006)
- Best result: Quarter-finals (2018)

Helvetia Cup
- Appearances: 14 (first in 1968)
- Best result: Runners-up (1989)

The Finland national badminton team (Finnish: Suomen sulkapallomaajoukkue) represents Finland in international badminton team competitions. It is controlled by Badminton Finland (Finnish: Suomen Sulkapallo), the national organization for badminton in Finland.

The Finnish men's team have once participated the Thomas Cup in 1994 but were eliminated in the group stage. The team's most recent achievement was achieving a semifinalist bronze position at the 2014 European Men's Team Badminton Championships. The women's team have never competed in the Uber Cup. Their best result was reaching the quarterfinals at the 2016 European Women's Team Badminton Championships.

The mixed team participated in the Sudirman Cup simultaneously until 2007. The team later qualified for the Sudirman Cup again in 2021 when Vantaa was chosen as the host for the 2021 Sudirman Cup. Finland finished in 14th place after being eliminated in the group stage.

== Participation in BWF competitions ==
=== Thomas Cup ===
Year	Round	Pos
1949	Did not enter	
1952	Did not enter	
1955	Did not enter	
1958	Did not enter	
1961	Did not enter	
1964	Did not enter	
1967	Did not enter	
1970	Did not enter	
1973	Did not qualify	
1976	Did not qualify	
1979	Did not enter	
1982	Did not enter	
1984	Did not qualify	
1986	Did not qualify	
1988	Did not qualify	
1990	Did not qualify	
1992	Did not qualify	
1994	Group Stage	7th
1996	Did not qualify	
1998
2000
2002	Did not qualify	
2004	Did not qualify	
2006	Did not qualify	
2026	Group stage	13th

Sudirman Cup

Year	Result
1989	20th - Group 5
1991	21st - Group 5
1993	20th - Group 5
1995	21st - Group 5
1997	20th - Group 3
1999	20th - Group 3
2001	19th - Group 3
2003	17th - Group 3
2005	22nd - Group 3
2007	23rd - Group 3
2021	14th − Group stage

**Red border color indicates tournament was held on home soil.

== Participation in European Team Badminton Championships ==
Finland finished up as semifinalists in the 2014 European Men's and Women's Team Badminton Championships. The team got through the quarterfinal by beating Sweden with a score of 3–0. The first three singles, Ville Lång, Eetu Heino and Anton Kaisti beat Sweden's Henri Hurskainen, Gabriel Ulldahl and Mattias Borg to win the tie.

Men's Team

Year	Result	Pos
(Greece) 2006	Group stage	
(Netherlands) 2008	Group stage	
(Poland) 2010	Group stage	
(Switzerland) 2014	(bronze) Semi-finalist	
(Russia) 2016	Group stage	
(Russia) 2018	Quarter-finalist	
(France) 2020	Group stage	
(Poland) 2024	Did not qualify	
(Turkey) 2026	Group stage	7th

Women's Team

Year	Result
(Greece) 2006	Group stage
(Netherlands) 2008	Group stage
(Poland) 2010	Group stage
(Switzerland) 2014	Group stage
(Russia) 2016	Quarter-finalist
(France) 2020	Group stage
(Poland) 2024	Did not qualify
(Turkey) 2026	Did not qualify

Mixed Team

Year	Result
(Sweden) 1972	Group stage
(Austria) 1974	Group stage
(Netherlands) 1980	Group stage
(West Germany) 1982	Group stage
(Sweden) 1986	Group stage
(Norway) 1988	Group stage
(Soviet Union) 1990	Group stage
(Scotland) 1992	Group stage
(Netherlands) 1994	Group stage
(Denmark) 1996	Group stage
(Bulgaria) 1998	Group stage
(Scotland) 2000	Group stage
(Sweden) 2002	Quarter-finalist
(Switzerland) 2004	Group stage
(Netherlands) 2006	Group stage
(Denmark) 2008	Group stage
(England) 2009	Group stage
(Netherlands) 2011	Group stage
(Russia) 2013	Group stage
(Finland) 2021	Group stage
(Azerbaijan) 2025	Did not qualify

**Red border color indicates tournament was held on home soil.

== Junior competitive record ==
=== World Junior Team Championships ===
==== Suhandinata Cup ====
Year	Result
(China) 2000	Did not enter
(South Africa) 2002	Group stage - 21st of 23
(Canada) 2004	Did not enter
(South Korea) 2006	Did not enter
(New Zealand) 2007	Did not enter
(India) 2008	Did not enter
(Malaysia) 2009	Did not enter
(Mexico) 2010	Did not enter
(Taiwan) 2011	Group X1 - 17th of 22
(Japan) 2012	Group W2 - 18th of 30
(Thailand) 2013	Group Y1 - 22nd of 30
(Malaysia) 2014	Did not enter
(Peru) 2015	Did not enter
(Spain) 2016	Group G2 - 49th of 52
(Indonesia) 2017	Group H2 - 29th of 44
(Canada) 2018	Did not enter
(Russia) 2019	Group A1 - 30th of 43
(New Zealand) 2020	Cancelled
(China) 2021	Cancelled
(Spain) 2022	Group E - 25th of 37
(United States) 2023	Did not enter
(China) 2024	Did not enter
(India) 2025	Did not enter
(Egypt) 2026	Group F2 - 28th of 47

=== European Junior Team Championships ===
==== Mixed team ====
Year	Result
(Italy) 2009	Group stage
(Finland) 2011	Group stage
(Turkey) 2013	Group stage
(Poland) 2015	Group stage
(France) 2017	Group stage
(Estonia) 2018	Group stage
(Finland) 2020	Group stage
(Serbia) 2022	Group stage
(Spain) 2024	Group stage

== Players ==
=== Current squad ===
As of 2 January 2024

==== Men's team ====
Name	DoB/Age	Ranking of event		
Name	DoB/Age	MS	MD	XD
Kalle Koljonen	26 February 1994 (age 32)	58	-	-
Joakim Oldorff	14 December 2002 (age 23)	75	991	-
Iikka Heino	9 January 1995 (age 31)	240	280	-
Robin Jäntti	10 March 2003 (age 23)	-	280	-
Eliel Melleri	31 December 2003 (age 22)	826	387	973
Niilo Nyqvist	10 January 2004 (age 22)	826	387	-

==== Women's team ====
Name	DoB/Age	Ranking of event		
Name	DoB/Age	WS	WD	XD
Nella Nyqvist	20 March 2006 (age 20)	261	805	973
Petra Saarnivaara	1 July 2005 (age 21)	565	766	-
Ria Tuominen	18 November 2005 (age 20)	1096	766	1160
Oona Tapola	18 August 2005 (age 21)	806	482	288
Sarah Asfar	9 December 2004 (age 21)	-	482	-
Nella Siilasmaa	19 December 1997 (age 28)	1100	913	-
