= European Men's and Women's Team Badminton Championships =

Badminton championships

The European Men's and Women's Team Badminton Championships is a tournament organized by the Badminton Europe (BE), held once every two years to crown the best badminton men's and women's national teams in Europe.

== Hosts ==
Year	Host city
2006	Thessalonica, Greece
2008	Almere, Netherlands
2010	Warsaw, Poland
2012	Amsterdam, Netherlands
2014	Basel, Switzerland
2016	Kazan, Russia
2018	Kazan, Russia
2020	Liévin, France
~~2022~~	Lahti, Finland
2024	Łódź, Poland
2026	Istanbul, Turkey
2028	Azerbaijan

== Medalists ==
Year	Men's team			Women's team		
Year	Gold	Silver	Bronze	Gold	Silver	Bronze
2006	Denmark	Germany	England	Netherlands	England	Germany
2008	Denmark	England	Germany	Denmark	Netherlands	Germany
2010	Denmark	Poland	Germany	Denmark	Russia	Germany
2012	Denmark	Germany	England	Germany	Denmark	Netherlands
2014	Denmark	England	Finland Germany	Denmark	Russia	Bulgaria Germany
2016	Denmark	France	England Germany	Denmark	Bulgaria	Germany Spain
2018	Denmark	England	France Germany	Denmark	Germany	Russia Spain
2020	Denmark	Netherlands	France Russia	Denmark	Germany	France Scotland
2024	Denmark	France	England Germany	Denmark	Spain	France Scotland
2026	France	Denmark	England Sweden	Bulgaria	Denmark	Turkey Ukraine

== Medal table ==
- Table updated after Championship 2026 in Istanbul

Rank	Nation	Gold	Silver	Bronze	Total
1	Denmark	16	3	0	19
2	Germany	1	4	11	16
3	France	1	2	4	7
4	Netherlands	1	2	1	4
5	Bulgaria	1	1	1	3
6	England	0	4	5	9
7	Russia	0	2	2	4
8	Spain	0	1	2	3
9	Poland	0	1	0	1
10	Scotland	0	0	2	2
11	Finland	0	0	1	1
11	Sweden	0	0	1	1
11	Turkey	0	0	1	1
11	Ukraine	0	0	1	1
Totals (14 entries)		20	20	32	72
