= European Mixed Team Badminton Championships =

Badminton championships

The European Mixed Team Badminton Championships is a tournament organized by the Badminton Europe (BE), held once every two years to crown the best badminton mixed national team in Europe.

It was played just before the European Badminton Championships, the individual competition, in the same venue. However, the European team tournament was split from the European individual event for the first time in 2009.

During the tournament, each tie comprises five matches: men's and women's singles, men and women's doubles, and mixed doubles.

== Hosts ==
Year	Host city
1972	Karlskrona, Sweden
1974	Vienna, Austria
1976	Dublin, Ireland
1978	Preston, England
1980	Groningen, Netherlands
1982	Böblingen, West Germany
1984	Preston, England
1986	Uppsala, Sweden
1988	Kristiansand, Norway
1990	Moscow, Soviet Union
1992	Glasgow, Scotland
1994	's-Hertogenbosch, Netherlands
1996	Herning, Denmark
1998	Sofia, Bulgaria
2000	Glasgow, Scotland

Year	Host city
2002	Malmö, Sweden
2004	Geneva, Switzerland
2006	's-Hertogenbosch, Netherlands
2008	Herning, Denmark
2009	Liverpool, England
2011	Amsterdam, Netherlands
2013	Moscow, Russia
2015	Leuven, Belgium
2017	Lubin, Poland
2019	Copenhagen, Denmark
2021	Vantaa, Finland
2023	Aire-sur-la-Lys, France
2025	Baku, Azerbaijan
2027	Tallinn, Estonia

== Results ==
#	Year	Gold	Silver	Bronze
Part of European Badminton Championships
1	1972	England	Denmark	West Germany
2	1974	England	Denmark	Sweden
3	1976	Denmark	England	Sweden
4	1978	England	Denmark	Sweden
5	1980	Denmark	England	Sweden
6	1982	England	Sweden	Denmark
7	1984	England	Denmark	Sweden
8	1986	Denmark	England	Sweden
9	1988	Denmark	Sweden	England
10	1990	Denmark	Sweden	England
11	1992	Sweden	Denmark	England
12	1994	Sweden	Denmark	England
13	1996	Denmark	Sweden	England
14	1998	Denmark	England	Sweden
15	2000	Denmark	England	Netherlands
16	2002	Denmark	England	Netherlands
17	2004	Denmark	Netherlands	Germany
18	2006	Denmark	Netherlands	England
19	2008	Denmark	England	Poland
Out of European Badminton Championships
20	2009	Denmark	England	Poland Russia
21	2011	Denmark	Germany	England Russia
22	2013	Germany	Denmark	England Russia
23	2015	Denmark	England	Germany Russia
24	2017	Denmark	Russia	England Germany
25	2019	Denmark	Germany	Netherlands Russia
26	2021	Denmark	France	Germany Russia
27	2023	Denmark	France	England Germany
28	2025	Denmark	France	England Germany

== Medal table ==
Rank	Nation	Gold	Silver	Bronze	Total
1	Denmark	20	7	1	28
2	England	5	9	11	25
3	Sweden	2	4	7	13
4	Germany	1	2	7	10
5	France	0	3	0	3
6	Netherlands	0	2	3	5
7	Russia	0	1	6	7
8	Poland	0	0	2	2
Totals (8 entries)		28	28	37	93
