= 2022 BWF World Junior Championships – Teams event group stage =

First stage of the competition

The group stage of the 2022 BWF World Junior Championships – Teams event is the first stage of the competition. It will hold at Palacio de Deportes de Santander in Santander, Spain, from 17 to 22 October 2022.

== Group composition ==
The draw for 38 teams competing in the tournament were announced on 10 August 2022.

Group A	Group B	Group C	Group D
1. Indonesia [1]; 2. Malaysia [9/16]; 3. Sweden; 4. Latvia	1. India [5/8]; 2. Slovenia [9/16]; 3. Australia; 4. China; 5. Iceland	1. Germany [3/4]; 2. Peru [9/16]; 3. Portugal; 4. Chinese Taipei; 5. Georgia	1. England [5/8]; 2. Netherlands [9/16]; 3. Tahiti; 4. Singapore; 5. Canada
Group E	Group F	Group G	Group H
1. Denmark [5/8]; 2. Thailand [9/16]; 3. Finland; 4. Slovakia; 5. South Korea	1. Spain [3/4]; 2. Estonia [9/16]; 3. Belgium; 4. Hong Kong; 5. Norway	1. United States [5/8]; 2. Czech Republic [9/16]; 3. Turkey; 4. Sri Lanka; 5. Armenia	1. Ukraine [2]; 2. Hungary [9/16]; 3. Egypt; 4. Japan

== Group A ==
Pos	Team	Pld	W	L	MF	MA	MD	GF	GA	GD	PF	PA	PD	Pts	Qualification
1	Indonesia [1]	3	3	0	14	1	+13	28	3	+25	646	350	+296	3	Qualified to knockout stage 1st to 8th
2	Malaysia [9/16]	3	2	1	11	4	+7	23	10	+13	636	475	+161	2	Qualified to knockout stage 9th to 16th place
3	Sweden [17/38]	3	1	2	5	10	−5	12	21	−9	499	592	−93	1	Qualified to knockout stage 17th to 24th place
4	Latvia [17/38]	3	0	3	0	15	−15	1	30	−29	274	638	−364	0	Qualified to knockout stage 25th to 32nd place

Source: TS

=== Indonesia vs Latvia ===
Indonesia
5
Palacio de Deportes de Santander, Court 1
17 October 2022, 13:00 UTC+2

Latvia
0

			1	2	3
1	(Indonesia) (Latvia)	Rafli Ramanda / Az-Azahra Putri Dania; Edžus Meirans / Annija Rulle-Titava	21; 8	21; 3
2	(Indonesia) (Latvia)	Alwi Farhan; Toms Sala	21; 4	21; 13
3	(Indonesia) (Latvia)	Ester Nurumi Tri Wardoyo; Anna Kupča	21; 6	21; 11
4	(Indonesia) (Latvia)	Raymond Indra / Daniel Edgar Marvino; Edžus Meirans / Rihards Zugs	21; 4	21; 5
5	(Indonesia) (Latvia)	Meilysa Trias Puspita Sari / Rachel Allessya Rose; Anna Kupča / Annija Rulle-Titava	21; 5	21; 6

=== Malaysia vs Sweden ===
Malaysia
5
Palacio de Deportes de Santander, Court 2
17 October 2022, 13:00 UTC+2

Sweden
0

			1	2	3
1	(Malaysia) (Sweden)	Justin Hoh; Eric Ramstedt	21; 10	21; 10
2	(Malaysia) (Sweden)	Siti Nurshuhaini; Khushi Harakamani	21; 12	21; 12
3	(Malaysia) (Sweden)	Fazriq Razif / Wong Vin Sean; Victor Morskogen / Daniel Ström	21; 12	21; 9
4	(Malaysia) (Sweden)	Ong Xin Yee / Carmen Ting; Elin Öhling / Elin Ryberg	21; 18	17; 21	21; 16
5	(Malaysia) (Sweden)	Bryan Goonting / Lee Xin Jie; Mio Molin / Sofia Strömvall	21; 16	21; 23	21; 15

=== Indonesia vs Sweden ===
Indonesia
5
Palacio de Deportes de Santander, Court 1
18 October 2022, 13:00 UTC+2

Sweden
0

			1	2	3
1	(Indonesia) (Sweden)	Muhammad Reza Al Fajri; Edvard Hylander	21; 11	21; 10
2	(Indonesia) (Sweden)	Mutiara Ayu Puspitasari; Khushi Harakamani	21; 6	21; 13
3	(Indonesia) (Sweden)	Putra Erwiansyah / Rayhan Fadillah; Victor Morskogen / Daniel Ström	21; 8	21; 9
4	(Indonesia) (Sweden)	Anisanaya Kamila / Az Zahra Ditya Ramadhani; Elin Öhling / Elin Ryberg	21; 17	21; 13
5	(Indonesia) (Sweden)	Zaidan Arrafi Nabawi / Felisha Pasaribu; Mio Molin / Sofia Strömvall	21; 9	21; 11

=== Malaysia vs Latvia ===
Malaysia
5
Palacio de Deportes de Santander, Court 2
18 October 2022, 13:00 UTC+2

Latvia
0

			1	2	3
1	(Malaysia) (Latvia)	Choi Jian Sheng / Lai Ting Cen; Rihards Zugs / Arina Babre	21; 12	21; 8
2	(Malaysia) (Latvia)	Justin Hoh; Toms Sala	21; 4	21; 3
3	(Malaysia) (Latvia)	Siti Nurshuhaini; Anna Kupča	21; 10	21; 8
4	(Malaysia) (Latvia)	Fazriq Razif / Wong Vin Sean; Edžus Meirans / Rihards Zugs	21; 11	21; 7
5	(Malaysia) (Latvia)	Ong Xin Yee / Carmen Ting; Arina Babre / Anna Kupča	21; 4	21; 8

=== Indonesia vs Malaysia ===
Indonesia
4
Palacio de Deportes de Santander, Court 1
19 October 2022, 13:00 UTC+2

Malaysia
1

			1	2	3
1	(Indonesia) (Malaysia)	Alwi Farhan; Justin Hoh	18; 21	18; 21
2	(Indonesia) (Malaysia)	Ester Nurumi Tri Wardoyo; Siti Nurshuhaini	21; 18	22; 24	21; 14
3	(Indonesia) (Malaysia)	Putra Erwiansyah / Rayhan Fadillah; Choi Jian Sheng / Bryan Goonting	21; 8	21; 10
4	(Indonesia) (Malaysia)	Meilysa Trias Puspita Sari / Rachel Allessya Rose; Ong Xin Yee / Carmen Ting	21; 15	21; 19
5	(Indonesia) (Malaysia)	Rafli Ramanda / Az-Azahra Putri Dania; Wong Vin Sean / Lai Ting Cen	21; 15	21; 13

=== Sweden vs Latvia ===
Sweden
5
Palacio de Deportes de Santander, Court 2
19 October 2022, 13:00 UTC+2

Latvia
0

			1	2	3
1	(Sweden) (Latvia)	Mio Molin / Sofia Strömvall; Edžus Meirans / Anna Kupča	21; 12	21; 6
2	(Sweden) (Latvia)	Elin Öhling; Arina Babre	21; 8	21; 10
3	(Sweden) (Latvia)	Eric Ramstedt; Edžus Meirans	21; 9	21; 9
4	(Sweden) (Latvia)	Amanda Magnusson / Elin Ryberg; Arina Babre / Anna Kupča	21; 19	8; 21	21; 14
5	(Sweden) (Latvia)	Mio Molin / Victor Morskogen; Toms Sala / Rihards Zugs	21; 16	21; 10

== Group B ==
Pos	Team	Pld	W	L	MF	MA	MD	GF	GA	GD	PF	PA	PD	Pts	Qualification
1	China [17/38]	4	4	0	20	0	+20	40	0	+40	840	339	+501	4	Qualified to knockout stage 1st to 8th
2	India [5/8]	4	3	1	13	7	+6	27	14	+13	744	544	+200	3	Qualified to knockout stage 9th to 16th place
3	Australia [17/38]	4	2	2	11	9	+2	23	20	+3	725	684	+41	2	Qualified to knockout stage 17th to 24th place
4	Slovenia [9/16]	4	1	3	6	14	−8	13	31	−18	575	853	−278	1	Qualified to knockout stage 25th to 32nd place
5	Iceland [17/38]	4	0	4	0	20	−20	2	40	−38	412	876	−464	0	Qualified to knockout stage 33rd to 38th place

Source: TS

=== India vs Iceland ===
India
5
Palacio de Deportes de Santander, Court 1
17 October 2022, 09:00 UTC+2

Iceland
0

			1	2	3
1	(India) (Iceland)	Samarveer Sharma / Radhika Sharma; Eiríkur Tumi Briem / Hrafnhildur Edda Ingvarsdóttir	21; 9	21; 15
2	(India) (Iceland)	Bharat Raghav; Gabríel Ingi Helgason	21; 9	21; 10
3	(India) (Iceland)	Unnati Hooda; Lilja Bu	21; 6	21; 7
4	(India) (Iceland)	Arsh Mohammad / Abhinav Thakur; Guðmundur Adam Gígja / Gabríel Ingi Helgason	21; 10	21; 11
5	(India) (Iceland)	Isharani Baruah / Devika Sihag; Lilja Bu / Hrafnhildur Edda Ingvarsdóttir	21; 11	21; 5

=== Slovenia vs China ===
Slovenia
0
Palacio de Deportes de Santander, Court 2
17 October 2022, 09:00 UTC+2

China
5

			1	2	3
1	(Slovenia) (China)	Mark Koroša; Zhu Xuanchen	5; 21	5; 21
2	(Slovenia) (China)	Kim Matovič; Zhang Xinran	5; 21	3; 21
3	(Slovenia) (China)	Jan Krumpak / Kevin Lin Lenarčič; Xu Huayu / Zhu Yijun	5; 21	8; 21
4	(Slovenia) (China)	Nika Bedič / Kim Matovič; Liu Shengshu / Wang Tingge	8; 21	9; 21
5	(Slovenia) (China)	Ziga Podgoršek / Spela Alič; Shen Xuanyao / Li Qian	9; 21	7; 21

=== Australia vs Iceland ===
Australia
5
Palacio de Deportes de Santander, Court 1
17 October 2022, 17:00 UTC+2

Iceland
0

			1	2	3
1	(Australia) (Iceland)	Otto Zhao / Yuelin Zhang; Eiríkur Tumi Briem / Hrafnhildur Edda Ingvarsdóttir	21; 8	21; 6
2	(Australia) (Iceland)	Jack Yu; Gabríel Ingi Helgason	21; 6	21; 11
3	(Australia) (Iceland)	Sydney Go; Lilja Bu	21; 6	21; 9
4	(Australia) (Iceland)	Ricky Tang / Otto Zhao; Guðmundur Adam Gígja / Gabríel Ingi Helgason	21; 12	21; 10
5	(Australia) (Iceland)	Dania Nugroho / Catrina Tan; Lilja Bu / Hrafnhildur Edda Ingvarsdóttir	21; 6	21; 10

=== India vs China ===
India
0
Palacio de Deportes de Santander, Court 2
17 October 2022, 17:00 UTC+2

China
5

			1	2	3
1	(India) (China)	Samarveer Sharma / Radhika Sharma; Zhu Yijun / Liu Shengshu	4; 21	5; 21
2	(India) (China)	Unnati Hooda; Zhang Xinran	15; 21	13; 21
3	(India) (China)	Bharat Raghav; Zhu Xuanchen	17; 21	17; 21
4	(India) (China)	Isharani Baruah / Devika Sihag; Liu Shengshu / Wang Tingge	10; 21	13; 21
5	(India) (China)	Arsh Mohammad / Abhinav Thakur; Xu Huayu / Zhu Yijun	14; 21	6; 21

=== Slovenia vs Iceland ===
Slovenia
5
Palacio de Deportes de Santander, Court 5
18 October 2022, 09:00 UTC+2

Iceland
0

			1	2	3
1	(Slovenia) (Iceland)	Špela Alič; Lilja Bu	22; 20	21; 14
2	(Slovenia) (Iceland)	Ziga Podgoršek; Gabríel Ingi Helgason	18; 21	21; 12	21; 11
3	(Slovenia) (Iceland)	Nika Bedič / Kim Matovič; Lilja Bu / Hrafnhildur Edda Ingvarsdóttir	21; 14	21; 17
4	(Slovenia) (Iceland)	Anel Hac Györköš / Mark Koroša; Eiríkur Tumi Briem / Guðmundur Adam Gígja	17; 21	21; 10	21; 17
5	(Slovenia) (Iceland)	Jaka Perič Marovt / Anja Jordan; Gabríel Ingi Helgason / Hrafnhildur Edda Ingvarsdóttir	21; 15	21; 13

=== India vs Australia ===
India
3
Palacio de Deportes de Santander, Court 6
18 October 2022, 09:00 UTC+2

Australia
2

			1	2	3
1	(India) (Australia)	Arsh Mohammad / Abhinav Thakur; Ricky Tang / Otto Zhao	12; 21	17; 21
2	(India) (Australia)	Unnati Hooda; Sydney Go	21; 6	21; 9
3	(India) (Australia)	Bharat Raghav; Jack Yu	19; 21	21; 16	15; 21
4	(India) (Australia)	Isharani Baruah / Devika Sihag; Dania Nugroho / Catrina Tan	21; 8	21; 8
5	(India) (Australia)	Vignesh Thathineni / Srinidhi Narayanan; Otto Zhao / Yuelin Zhang	21; 12	21; 16

=== Slovenia vs Australia ===
Slovenia
1
Palacio de Deportes de Santander, Court 3
18 October 2022, 17:00 UTC+2

Australia
4

			1	2	3
1	(Slovenia) (Australia)	Jaka Perič Marovt / Anja Jordan; Jack Yu / Dania Nugroho	15; 21	10; 21
2	(Slovenia) (Australia)	Mark Koroša; Jun Goh	18; 21	21; 19	16; 21
3	(Slovenia) (Australia)	Nika Bedič; Sydney Go	9; 21	11; 21
4	(Slovenia) (Australia)	Jan Krumpak / Kevin Lin Lenarčič; Ricky Tang / Otto Zhao	6; 21	11; 21
5	(Slovenia) (Australia)	Špela Alič / Anja Jordan; Sydney Go / Yuelin Zhang	21; 19	21; 23	21; 19

=== China vs Iceland ===
China
5
Palacio de Deportes de Santander, Court 5
18 October 2022, 17:00 UTC+2

Iceland
0

			1	2	3
1	(China) (Iceland)	Shen Xuanyao / Li Qian; Eiríkur Tumi Briem / Hrafnhildur Edda Ingvarsdóttir	21; 4	21; 6
2	(China) (Iceland)	Yuan Anqi; Lilja Bu	21; 5	21; 1
3	(China) (Iceland)	Pan Yinlong; Gabríel Ingi Helgason	21; 3	21; 8
4	(China) (Iceland)	Luo Yi / Wang Tingge; Lilja Bu / Hrafnhildur Edda Ingvarsdóttir	21; 6	21; 4
5	(China) (Iceland)	Chen Yijiang / Zhang Lejian; Eiríkur Tumi Briem / Guðmundur Adam Gígja	21; 5	21; 8

=== Australia vs China ===
Australia
0
Palacio de Deportes de Santander, Court 3
19 October 2022, 13:00 UTC+2

China
5

			1	2	3
1	(Australia) (China)	Otto Zhao / Yuelin Zhang; Zhu Yijun / Liu Shengshu	9; 21	12; 21
2	(Australia) (China)	Catrina Tan; Zhang Xinran	15; 21	9; 21
3	(Australia) (China)	Jack Yu; Wang Zijun	18; 21	10; 21
4	(Australia) (China)	Dania Nugroho / Catrina Tan; Liu Shengshu / Wang Tingge	6; 21	3; 21
5	(Australia) (China)	Ricky Tang / Otto Zhao; Xu Huayu / Zhu Yijun	14; 21	12; 21

=== India vs Slovenia ===
India
5
Palacio de Deportes de Santander, Court 4
19 October 2022, 13:00 UTC+2

Slovenia
0

			1	2	3
1	(India) (Slovenia)	Vignesh Thathineni / Srinidhi Narayanan; Ziga Podgoršek / Spela Alič	21; 11	21; 9
2	(India) (Slovenia)	Ayush Shetty; Kevin Lin Lenarčič	21; 5	21; 5
3	(India) (Slovenia)	Nicholas Raj / Tushar Suveer; Anel Hac Gyorkos / Mark Koroša	21; 15	21; 14
4	(India) (Slovenia)	Rakshitha Ramraj; Anja Jordan	21; 4	21; 4
5	(India) (Slovenia)	Shreya Balaji / Srinidhi Narayanan; Nika Bedič / Kim Matovič	21; 9	21; 6

== Group C ==
Pos	Team	Pld	W	L	MF	MA	MD	GF	GA	GD	PF	PA	PD	Pts	Qualification
1	Chinese Taipei [17/38]	4	4	0	20	0	+20	40	0	+40	840	370	+470	4	Qualified to knockout stage 1st to 8th
2	Germany [3/4]	4	3	1	13	7	+6	27	17	+10	818	638	+180	3	Qualified to knockout stage 9th to 16th place
3	Peru [9/16]	4	2	2	10	10	0	22	20	+2	702	656	+46	2	Qualified to knockout stage 17th to 24th place
4	Portugal [17/38]	4	1	3	7	13	−6	15	27	−12	626	722	−96	1	Qualified to knockout stage 25th to 32nd place
5	Georgia [17/38]	4	0	4	0	20	−20	0	40	−40	240	840	−600	0	Qualified to knockout stage 33rd to 38th place

Source: TS

=== Germany vs Georgia ===
Germany
5
Palacio de Deportes de Santander, Court 3
17 October 2022, 09:00 UTC+2

Georgia
0

			1	2	3
1	(Germany) (Georgia (country))	Simon Krax / Cara Siebrecht; Garri Ter-Karapetyan / Elisabed Zumbulidze	21; 5	21; 3
2	(Germany) (Georgia (country))	Karim Krehemeier; Daniel Tatevosyan	21; 7	21; 9
3	(Germany) (Georgia (country))	Selin Hübsch; Marina Ovasapyan	21; 4	21; 8
4	(Germany) (Georgia (country))	Jonathan Dresp / Jarne Schlevoigt; Daniel Tatevosyan / Garri Ter-Karapetyan	21; 3	21; 3
5	(Germany) (Georgia (country))	Julia Meyer / Cara Siebrecht; Marina Ovasapyan / Elisabed Zumbulidze	21; 5	21; 9

=== Peru vs Chinese Taipei ===
Peru
0
Palacio de Deportes de Santander, Court 4
17 October 2022, 09:00 UTC+2

Chinese Taipei
5

			1	2	3
1	(Peru) (Chinese Taipei)	Sharum Durand; Kuo Kuan-lin	15; 21	10; 21
2	(Peru) (Chinese Taipei)	Rafaela Munar; Ruo Hsuan-ko	17; 21	8; 21
3	(Peru) (Chinese Taipei)	Fabrizio Tabini / Adriano Viale; Huang Jui-hsuan / Tsai Fu-cheng	7; 21	8; 21
4	(Peru) (Chinese Taipei)	Taisia Kasianov / Fernanda Munar; Nicole Gonzales Chan / Yang Chu-yun	8; 21	12; 21
5	(Peru) (Chinese Taipei)	Sharum Durand / Namie Miyahira; Huang Tsung-i / Lin Yu-hao	17; 21	5; 21

=== Portugal vs Georgia ===
Portugal
5
Palacio de Deportes de Santander, Court 3
17 October 2022, 17:00 UTC+2

Georgia
0

			1	2	3
1	(Portugal) (Georgia (country))	Gonçalo Silva / Margarida Cabaço; Garri Ter-Karapetyan / Marina Ovasapyan	21; 5	21; 5
2	(Portugal) (Georgia (country))	Rodrigo Maciel; Daniel Tatevosyan	21; 9	21; 11
3	(Portugal) (Georgia (country))	Madalena Fortunato; Elisabed Zumbulidze	21; 8	21; 4
4	(Portugal) (Georgia (country))	Santiago Batalha / Dinis Maia; Daniel Tatevosyan / Garri Ter-Karapetyan	21; 6	21; 5
5	(Portugal) (Georgia (country))	Madalena Fortunato / Beatriz Roberto; Marina Ovasapyan / Elisabed Zumbulidze	21; 12	21; 8

=== Germany vs Chinese Taipei ===
Germany
0
Palacio de Deportes de Santander, Court 4
17 October 2022, 17:00 UTC+2

Chinese Taipei
5

			1	2	3
1	(Germany) (Chinese Taipei)	Jarne Schlevoigt / Julia Meyer; Huang Tsung-i / Lin Yu-hao	14; 21	15; 21
2	(Germany) (Chinese Taipei)	Antonia Schaller; Wang Pei-yu	15; 21	10; 21
3	(Germany) (Chinese Taipei)	Sanjeevi Padmanabhan Vasudevan; Kuo Kuan-lin	10; 21	11; 21
4	(Germany) (Chinese Taipei)	Selin Hübsch / Julia Meyer; Nicole Gonzales Chan / Yang Chu-yun	13; 21	14; 21
5	(Germany) (Chinese Taipei)	Jarne Schlevoigt / Nikolaj Stupplich; Huang Jui-hsuan / Tsai Fu-cheng	11; 21	17; 21

=== Peru vs Georgia ===
Peru
5
Palacio de Deportes de Santander, Court 7
18 October 2022, 09:00 UTC+2

Georgia
0

			1	2	3
1	(Peru) (Georgia (country))	Fabrizio Tabini / Taisia Kasianov; Daniel Tatevosyan / Marina Ovasapyan	21; 13	21; 8
2	(Peru) (Georgia (country))	Adriano Viale; Garri Ter-Karapetyan	21; 5	21; 3
3	(Peru) (Georgia (country))	Namie Miyahira; Elisabed Zumbulidze	21; 9	21; 11
4	(Peru) (Georgia (country))	Sharum Durand / Adriano Viale; Daniel Tatevosyan / Garri Ter-Karapetyan	21; 2	21; 9
5	(Peru) (Georgia (country))	Fernanda Munar / Rafaela Munar; Marina Ovasapyan / Elisabed Zumbulidze	21; 3	21; 8

=== Germany vs Portugal ===
Germany
4
Palacio de Deportes de Santander, Court 8
18 October 2022, 09:00 UTC+2

Portugal
1

			1	2	3
1	(Germany) (Portugal)	Simon Krax / Cara Siebrecht; Mathias Rodrigues / Beatriz Roberto	21; 14	21; 10
2	(Germany) (Portugal)	Karim Krehemeier; Santiago Batalha	21; 15	21; 13
3	(Germany) (Portugal)	Selin Hübsch; Madalena Fortunato	21; 14	17; 21	21; 16
4	(Germany) (Portugal)	Jonathan Dresp / Nikolaj Stupplich; Santiago Batalha / Dinis Maia	21; 8	21; 12
5	(Germany) (Portugal)	Julia Meyer / Cara Siebrecht; Madalena Fortunato / Beatriz Roberto	21; 17	19; 21	19; 21

=== Chinese Taipei vs Georgia ===
Chinese Taipei
5
Palacio de Deportes de Santander, Court 7
18 October 2022, 17:00 UTC+2

Georgia
0

			1	2	3
1	(Chinese Taipei) (Georgia (country))	Hsieh Yun-shan; Marina Ovasapyan	21; 5	21; 4
2	(Chinese Taipei) (Georgia (country))	Tsai Cheng-han; Garri Ter-Karapetyan	21; 5	21; 2
3	(Chinese Taipei) (Georgia (country))	Chen You-yu / Yang Zih-sian; Daniel Tatevosyan / Elisabed Zumbulidze	21; 2	21; 6
4	(Chinese Taipei) (Georgia (country))	Chen Yu-syuan / Lin Yu-pei; Marina Ovasapyan / Elisabed Zumbulidze	21; 3	21; 4
5	(Chinese Taipei) (Georgia (country))	Chang Hsuan-yu / Yang Cheng-hao; Daniel Tatevosyan / Garri Ter-Karapetyan	21; 3	21; 6

=== Peru vs Portugal ===
Peru
4
Palacio de Deportes de Santander, Court 8
18 October 2022, 17:00 UTC+2

Portugal
1

			1	2	3
1	(Peru) (Portugal)	Sharum Durand / Namie Miyahira; Mathias Rodrigues / Beatriz Roberto	21; 7	21; 18
2	(Peru) (Portugal)	Fernanda Munar; Madalena Fortunato	15; 21	11; 21
3	(Peru) (Portugal)	Adriano Viale; Santiago Batalha	22; 20	21; 14
4	(Peru) (Portugal)	Fernanda Munar / Rafaela Munar; Madalena Fortunato / Beatriz Roberto	21; 9	21; 10
5	(Peru) (Portugal)	Sharum Durand / Adriano Viale; Santiago Batalha / Dinis Maia	21; 13	21; 8

=== Portugal vs Chinese Taipei ===
Portugal
0
Palacio de Deportes de Santander, Court 5
19 October 2022, 13:00 UTC+2

Chinese Taipei
5

			1	2	3
1	(Portugal) (Chinese Taipei)	Gonçalo Silva / Margarida Cabaço; Ting Yen-chen / Lin Yu-hao	13; 21	8; 21
2	(Portugal) (Chinese Taipei)	Rodrigo Maciel; Kuo Kuan-lin	7; 21	14; 21
3	(Portugal) (Chinese Taipei)	Madalena Fortunato; Wang Pei-yu	9; 21	14; 21
4	(Portugal) (Chinese Taipei)	Mathias Rodrigues / Gonçalo Silva; Huang Jui-hsuan / Tsai Fu-cheng	6; 21	9; 21
5	(Portugal) (Chinese Taipei)	Margarida Cabaco / Beatriz Roberto; Nicole Gonzales Chan / Yang Chu-yun	3; 21	10; 21

=== Germany vs Peru ===
Germany
4
Palacio de Deportes de Santander, Court 6
19 October 2022, 13:00 UTC+2

Peru
1

			1	2	3
1	(Germany) (Peru)	Antonia Schaller; Namie Miyahira Tsukazan	21; 16	21; 19
2	(Germany) (Peru)	Jarne Schlevoigt / Julia Meyer; Sharum Durand Cardenas / Namie Miyahira Tsukazan	21; 13	21; 6
3	(Germany) (Peru)	Sanjeevi Padmanabhan Vasudevan; Adriano Viale Aguirre	20; 22	12; 21
4	(Germany) (Peru)	Jonathan Dresp / Simon Krax; Sharum Durand Cardenas / Adriano Viale Aguirre	15; 21	21; 12	21; 11
5	(Germany) (Peru)	Selin Hübsch / Julia Meyer; Fernanda Munar Solimano / Rafaela Munar Solimano	19; 21	21; 13	21; 15

== Group D ==
Pos	Team	Pld	W	L	MF	MA	MD	GF	GA	GD	PF	PA	PD	Pts	Qualification
1	England [5/8]	4	4	0	16	4	+12	32	11	+21	856	634	+222	4	Qualified to knockout stage 1st to 8th
2	Canada [17/38]	4	3	1	15	5	+10	31	11	+20	812	572	+240	3	Qualified to knockout stage 9th to 16th place
3	Singapore [17/38]	4	2	2	12	8	+4	26	17	+9	796	698	+98	2	Qualified to knockout stage 17th to 24th place
4	Netherlands [9/16]	4	1	3	7	13	−6	16	26	−10	638	740	−102	1	Qualified to knockout stage 25th to 32nd place
5	Tahiti [17/38]	4	0	4	0	20	−20	0	40	−40	382	840	−458	0	Qualified to knockout stage 33rd to 38th place

Source: TS

=== England vs Canada ===
England
3
Palacio de Deportes de Santander, Court 5
17 October 2022, 09:00 UTC+2

Canada
2

			1	2	3
1	(England) (Canada)	Samuel Jones / Estelle van Leeuwen; Josh Nguyen / Chloe Hoang	21; 18	21; 11
2	(England) (Canada)	Nadeem Dalvi; Victor Lai	10; 21	20; 22
3	(England) (Canada)	Lisa Curtin; Jackie Dent	13; 21	17; 21
4	(England) (Canada)	Blake Hoang / Samuel Jones; Timothy Lock / Alex Xu	21; 15	21; 12
5	(England) (Canada)	Lisa Curtin / Estelle van Leeuwen; Jessica Cheng / Nong Sophia	21; 16	17; 21	21; 16

=== Netherlands vs Singapore ===
Netherlands
1
Palacio de Deportes de Santander, Court 6
17 October 2022, 09:00 UTC+2

Singapore
4

			1	2	3
1	(Netherlands) (Singapore)	Casper Spaans / Rune van Dalm; Nge Joo Jie / Johann Prajogo	5; 21	8; 21
2	(Netherlands) (Singapore)	Kirsten de Wit / Meerte Loos; Joelle Chee / Li Zhenghong	21; 17	21; 12
3	(Netherlands) (Singapore)	Noah Haase; Marcus Lau	16; 21	14; 21
4	(Netherlands) (Singapore)	Flora Wang; Megan Lee	9; 21	15; 21
5	(Netherlands) (Singapore)	Noah Haase / Kirsten de Wit; Johann Prajogo / Heng Xiao En	16; 21	23; 21	14; 21

=== Tahiti vs Canada ===
Tahiti
0
Palacio de Deportes de Santander, Court 5
17 October 2022, 17:00 UTC+2

Canada
5

			1	2	3
1	(French Polynesia) (Canada)	Elias Maublanc / Kaihei Teiefitu; Harold Tan / Alex Xu	14; 21	12; 21
2	(French Polynesia) (Canada)	Jenica Lesourd; Chloe Hoang	5; 21	8; 21
3	(French Polynesia) (Canada)	Heiva Yvonet; Timothy Lock	5; 21	6; 21
4	(French Polynesia) (Canada)	Heirautea Curet / Maeva Gaillard; Jackie Dent / Christina Lin	6; 21	4; 21
5	(French Polynesia) (Canada)	Elias Maublanc / Jenica Lesourd; Daniel Zhou / Jessica Cheng	6; 21	13; 21

=== England vs Singapore ===
England
3
Palacio de Deportes de Santander, Court 6
17 October 2022, 17:00 UTC+2

Singapore
2

			1	2	3
1	(England) (Singapore)	Samuel Jones / Estelle van Leeuwen; Johann Prajogo / Heng Xiao En	19; 21	25; 23	21; 12
2	(England) (Singapore)	Leona Lee; Megan Lee	15; 21	18; 21
3	(England) (Singapore)	Nadeem Dalvi; Marcus Lau	21; 19	21; 16
4	(England) (Singapore)	Lisa Curtin / Estelle van Leeuwen; Joelle Chee / Li Zhenghong	21; 14	21; 14
5	(England) (Singapore)	Blake Hoang / Samuel Jones; Nge Joo Jie / Johann Prajogo	15; 21	16; 21

=== Netherlands vs Canada ===
Netherlands
1
Palacio de Deportes de Santander, Court 3
18 October 2022, 13:00 UTC+2

Canada
4

			1	2	3
1	(Netherlands) (Canada)	Noah Haase / Kirsten de Wit; Victor Lai / Jessica Cheng	21; 14	21; 19
2	(Netherlands) (Canada)	Rune van Dalm; Josh Nguyen	13; 21	1; 21
3	(Netherlands) (Canada)	Flora Wang; Chloe Hoang	10; 21	10; 21
4	(Netherlands) (Canada)	Noah Haase / Casper Spaans; Timothy Lock / Daniel Zhou	11; 21	14; 21
5	(Netherlands) (Canada)	Kirsten de Wit / Meerte Loos; Jackie Dent / Christina Lin	14; 21	10; 21

=== England vs Tahiti ===
England
5
Palacio de Deportes de Santander, Court 4
18 October 2022, 13:00 UTC+2

Tahiti
0

			1	2	3
1	(England) (French Polynesia)	Nadeem Dalvi / Jia Bin Lee; Elias Maublanc / Heiva Yvonet	21; 15	21; 12
2	(England) (French Polynesia)	Leona Lee; Maeva Gaillard	21; 6	21; 6
3	(England) (French Polynesia)	Michael Pang; Kaihei Teiefitu	21; 7	21; 11
4	(England) (French Polynesia)	Leona Lee / Tashvi Parab; Heirautea Curet / Jenica Lesourd	21; 10	21; 18
5	(England) (French Polynesia)	Jia Bin Lee / Chloe Dennis; Kaihei Teiefitu / Maeva Gaillard	21; 2	21; 9

=== Singapore vs Canada ===
Singapore
1
Palacio de Deportes de Santander, Court 5
19 October 2022, 09:00 UTC+2

Canada
4

			1	2	3
1	(Singapore) (Canada)	Nge Joo Jie / Johann Prajogo; Timothy Lock / Daniel Zhou	21; 12	21; 9
2	(Singapore) (Canada)	Megan Lee; Jackie Dent	16; 21	21; 18	10; 21
3	(Singapore) (Canada)	Ryan Tan; Josh Nguyen	16; 21	10; 21
4	(Singapore) (Canada)	Chia Xin Ying / Heng Xiao En; Jessica Cheng / Sophia Nong	14; 21	9; 21
5	(Singapore) (Canada)	Johann Prajogo / Li Zhenghong; Victor Lai / Chloe Hoang	19; 21	8; 21

=== Netherlands vs Tahiti ===
Netherlands
5
Palacio de Deportes de Santander, Court 6
19 October 2022, 09:00 UTC+2

Tahiti
0

			1	2	3
1	(Netherlands) (French Polynesia)	Noah Haase; Elias Maublanc	21; 7	21; 9
2	(Netherlands) (French Polynesia)	Flora Wang; Heirautea Curet	21; 16	21; 12
3	(Netherlands) (French Polynesia)	Casper Spaans / Rune van Dalm; Kaihei Teiefitu / Heiva Yvonet	21; 12	21; 10
4	(Netherlands) (French Polynesia)	Kirsten de Wit / Meerte Loos; Maeva Gaillard / Jenica Lesourd	21; 6	21; 10
5	(Netherlands) (French Polynesia)	Noah Haase / Kirsten de Wit; Heiva Yvonet / Heirautea Curet	21; 4	21; 5

=== Tahiti vs Singapore ===
Tahiti
0
Palacio de Deportes de Santander, Court 3
19 October 2022, 17:00 UTC+2

Singapore
5

			1	2	3
1	(French Polynesia) (Singapore)	Elias Maublanc / Jenica Lesourd; Foo See Git / Li Zhenghong	18; 21	19; 21
2	(French Polynesia) (Singapore)	Heirautea Curet; Elsa Lai	17; 21	14; 21
3	(French Polynesia) (Singapore)	Kaihei Teiefitu; Remus Ng	6; 21	7; 21
4	(French Polynesia) (Singapore)	Maeva Gillard / Jenica Lesourd; Li Zhenghong / Li Zhengyan	8; 21	7; 21
5	(French Polynesia) (Singapore)	Elias Maublanc / Jenica Lesourd; Foo See Git / Safin Noor	11; 21	9; 21

=== England vs Netherlands ===
England
5
Palacio de Deportes de Santander, Court 5
19 October 2022, 17:00 UTC+2

Netherlands
0

			1	2	3
1	(England) (Netherlands)	Samuel Jones / Estelle van Leeuwen; Casper Spaans / Meerte Loos	21; 6	21; 10
2	(England) (Netherlands)	Lisa Curtin; Flora Wang	21; 12	21; 16
3	(England) (Netherlands)	Nadeem Dalvi; Rune van Dalm	20; 22	21; 15	21; 15
4	(England) (Netherlands)	Lisa Curtin / Estelle van Leeuwen; Kirsten de Wit / Meerte Loos	21; 16	21; 8
5	(England) (Netherlands)	Blake Hoang / Samuel Jones; Casper Spaans / Rune van Dalm	21; 10	21; 11

== Group E ==
Pos	Team	Pld	W	L	MF	MA	MD	GF	GA	GD	PF	PA	PD	Pts	Qualification
1	South Korea [17/38]	4	4	0	19	1	+18	39	3	+36	881	541	+340	4	Qualified to knockout stage 1st to 8th
2	Denmark [5/8]	4	3	1	13	7	+6	27	18	+9	834	737	+97	3	Qualified to knockout stage 9th to 16th place
3	Thailand [9/16]	4	2	2	13	7	+6	27	15	+12	789	622	+167	2	Qualified to knockout stage 17th to 24th place
4	Finland [17/38]	4	1	3	4	16	−12	10	32	−22	610	807	−197	1	Qualified to knockout stage 25th to 32nd place
5	Slovakia [17/38]	4	0	4	1	19	−18	4	39	−35	477	884	−407	0	Qualified to knockout stage 33rd to 38th place

Source: TS

=== Denmark vs South Korea ===
Denmark
0
Palacio de Deportes de Santander, Court 7
17 October 2022, 09:00 UTC+2

South Korea
5

			1	2	3
1	(Denmark) (South Korea)	Christian Faust Kjær / Emma Irring Braüner; Park Beom-soo / Ko Hee-joo	19; 21	16; 21
2	(Denmark) (South Korea)	Benedicte Sillassen; Kim Min-seon	20; 21	11; 21
3	(Denmark) (South Korea)	Jakob Houe; Kim Byung-jae	12; 21	16; 21
4	(Denmark) (South Korea)	Maria Højlund Tommerup / Kathrine Vang; Jeong Da-yeon / Kim Min-ji	22; 20	15; 21	18; 21
5	(Denmark) (South Korea)	Jakob Houe / Christian Faust Kjær; Cho Song-hyun / Park Beom-soo	19; 21	11; 21

=== Thailand vs Slovakia ===
Thailand
5
Palacio de Deportes de Santander, Court 8
17 October 2022, 09:00 UTC+2

Slovakia
0

			1	2	3
1	(Thailand) (Slovakia)	Peeratchai Sukphun / Pakkapon Teeraratsakul; Sebastián Kadlec / Simeon Suchý	21; 4	21; 10
2	(Thailand) (Slovakia)	Sarunrak Vitidsarn; Lea Výbochová	21; 2	21; 5
3	(Thailand) (Slovakia)	Panitchaphon Teeraratsakul; Richard Pavlík	21; 6	21; 5
4	(Thailand) (Slovakia)	Thitiphon Klomyong / Sirinad Pirabran; Sofia Slosiariková / Michaela Telehaničová	21; 13	21; 9
5	(Thailand) (Slovakia)	Witchaya Jintamuttha / Patida Srisawat; Sebastián Kadlec / Olívia Kadlecová	21; 12	21; 13

=== Finland vs South Korea ===
Finland
0
Palacio de Deportes de Santander, Court 7
17 October 2022, 17:00 UTC+2

South Korea
5

			1	2	3
1	(Finland) (South Korea)	Niilo Nyqvist; Park Sung-ju	9; 21	19; 21
2	(Finland) (South Korea)	Nella Nyqvist; Park Na-kyung	15; 21	14; 21
3	(Finland) (South Korea)	Kaiwen Li / Aleksi Mäki; Cho Moon-hee / Jang Joon-hee	6; 21	13; 21
4	(Finland) (South Korea)	Petra Saarnivaara / Oona Tapola; Choi Kyung-jin / Park Seul	6; 21	9; 21
5	(Finland) (South Korea)	Rasmus Andersson / Sarah Asfar; Cho Song-hyun / Kim Ye-ri	8; 21	12; 21

=== Denmark vs Slovakia ===
Denmark
5
Palacio de Deportes de Santander, Court 8
17 October 2022, 17:00 UTC+2

Slovakia
0

			1	2	3
1	(Denmark) (Slovakia)	Jeppe Søby / Sofie Røjkjær; Richard Pavlík / Michaela Telehaničová	21; 10	21; 14
2	(Denmark) (Slovakia)	William Bøgebjerg; Simeon Suchý	21; 16	11; 21	21; 16
3	(Denmark) (Slovakia)	Lærke Hvid; Sofia Slosiariková	21; 11	16; 21	21; 11
4	(Denmark) (Slovakia)	Jonathan Melgaard / Mike Vestergaard; Sebastián Kadlec / Simeon Suchý	21; 9	21; 7
5	(Denmark) (Slovakia)	Emma Irring Braüner / Frederikke Østergaard; Olívia Kadlecová / Michaela Telehaničová	21; 12	21; 8

=== Thailand vs South Korea ===
Thailand
1
Palacio de Deportes de Santander, Court 5
18 October 2022, 13:00 UTC+2

South Korea
4

			1	2	3
1	(Thailand) (South Korea)	Peeratchai Sukphun / Pakkapon Teeraratsakul; Cho Song-hyun / Park Beom-soo	20; 22	14; 21
2	(Thailand) (South Korea)	Sarunrak Vitidsarn; Kim Min-seon	8; 21	16; 21
3	(Thailand) (South Korea)	Panitchaphon Teeraratsakul; Kim Byung-jae	14; 21	23; 21	21; 19
4	(Thailand) (South Korea)	Puttita Phanthui / Patida Srisawat; Kim Min-ji / Kim Min-seon	18; 21	13; 21
5	(Thailand) (South Korea)	Pakkapon Teeraratsakul / Fungfa Korpthammakit; Kim Byung-jae / Jeong Da-yeon	18; 21	11; 21

=== Denmark vs Finland ===
Denmark
5
Palacio de Deportes de Santander, Court 6
18 October 2022, 13:00 UTC+2

Finland
0

			1	2	3
1	(Denmark) (Finland)	Hjalte Johansen / Jeppe Søby; Rasmus Andersson / Kaiwen Li	21; 12	21; 12
2	(Denmark) (Finland)	Frederikke Østergaard; Nella Nyqvist	22; 20	9; 21	21; 8
3	(Denmark) (Finland)	Christian Faust Kjær; Niilo Nyqvist	21; 19	21; 16
4	(Denmark) (Finland)	Maria Højlund Tommerup / Kathrine Vang; Petra Saarnivaara / Oona Tapola	21; 14	21; 11
5	(Denmark) (Finland)	Jakob Houe / Sofie Røjkjær; Kaiwen Li / Nella Nyqvist	21; 14	21; 10

=== Slovakia vs South Korea ===
Slovakia
0
Palacio de Deportes de Santander, Court 7
19 October 2022, 09:00 UTC+2

South Korea
5

			1	2	3
1	(Slovakia) (South Korea)	Sebastián Kadlec; Park Sung-ju	3; 21	9; 21
2	(Slovakia) (South Korea)	Olívia Kadlecová; Park Seul	8; 21	11; 21
3	(Slovakia) (South Korea)	Sebastián Kadlec / Richard Pavlík; Cho Hyeon-woo / Kim Tae-rim	6; 21	6; 21
4	(Slovakia) (South Korea)	Sofia Slosiariková / Lea Výbochová; Choi Kyung-jin / Jeong Da-yeon	9; 21	6; 21
5	(Slovakia) (South Korea)	Simeon Suchý / Michaela Telehaničová; Cho Song-hyun / Ko Hee-joo	11; 21	6; 21

=== Thailand vs Finland ===
Thailand
5
Palacio de Deportes de Santander, Court 8
19 October 2022, 09:00 UTC+2

Finland
0

			1	2	3
1	(Thailand) (Finland)	Apiluk Gaterahong / Witchaya Jintamuttha; Rasmus Andersson / Kaiwen Li	21; 9	21; 8
2	(Thailand) (Finland)	Sarunrak Vitidsarn; Nella Nyqvist	21; 13	21; 16
3	(Thailand) (Finland)	Adisak Prasertphetmanee; Aleksi Mäki	21; 14	21; 18
4	(Thailand) (Finland)	Thitiphon Klomyong / Sirinad Pirabran; Petra Saarnivaara / Oona Tapola	21; 10	21; 7
5	(Thailand) (Finland)	Tanakorn Meechai / Fungfa Korpthammakit; Rasmus Andersson / Sarah Asfar	21; 14	21; 6

=== Finland vs Slovakia ===
Finland
4
Palacio de Deportes de Santander, Court 7
19 October 2022, 09:00 UTC+2

Slovakia
1

			1	2	3
1	(Finland) (Slovakia)	Nella Nyqvist; Sofia Slosiariková	21; 6	21; 10
2	(Finland) (Slovakia)	Niilo Nyqvist; Simeon Suchý	21; 13	21; 18
3	(Finland) (Slovakia)	Petra Saarnivaara / Oona Tapola; Olívia Kadlecová / Sofia Slosiariková	23; 21	21; 16
4	(Finland) (Slovakia)	Rasmus Andersson / Aleksi Mäki; Richard Pavlík / Simeon Suchý	21; 19	19; 21	17; 21
5	(Finland) (Slovakia)	Kaiwen Li / Nella Nyqvist; Sebastián Kadlec / Olívia Kadlecová	21; 10	21; 12

=== Denmark vs Thailand ===
Denmark
3
Palacio de Deportes de Santander, Court 8
19 October 2022, 17:00 UTC+2

Thailand
2

			1	2	3
1	(Denmark) (Thailand)	Christian Faust Kjær / Emma Irring Braüner; Tanakorn Meechai / Fungfa Korpthammakit	19; 21	21; 15	21; 5
2	(Denmark) (Thailand)	Benedicte Sillassen; Sarunrak Vitidsarn	8; 21	15; 21
3	(Denmark) (Thailand)	Jakob Houe; Panitchaphon Teeraratsakul	22; 20	21; 15
4	(Denmark) (Thailand)	Maria Højlund Tommerup / Kathrine Vang; Puttita Phanthui / Patida Srisawat	22; 24	7; 21
5	(Denmark) (Thailand)	Jakob Houe / Christian Faust Kjær; Apiluk Gaterahong / Witchaya Jintamuttha	21; 15	21; 15

== Group F ==
Pos	Team	Pld	W	L	MF	MA	MD	GF	GA	GD	PF	PA	PD	Pts	Qualification
1	Spain [3/4]	4	4	0	15	5	+10	30	14	+16	824	702	+122	4	Qualified to knockout stage 1st to 8th
2	Hong Kong [17/38]	4	3	1	15	5	+10	32	13	+19	889	680	+209	3	Qualified to knockout stage 9th to 16th place
3	Estonia [9/16]	4	2	2	11	9	+2	25	22	+3	806	820	−14	2	Qualified to knockout stage 17th to 24th place
4	Belgium [17/38]	4	1	3	8	12	−4	19	26	−7	745	812	−67	1	Qualified to knockout stage 25th to 32nd place
5	Norway [17/38]	4	0	4	1	19	−18	7	38	−31	665	915	−250	0	Qualified to knockout stage 33rd to 38th place

First match(es) will be played: 17 October 2022. Source: TS

=== Spain vs Norway ===
Spain
5
Palacio de Deportes de Santander, Court 3
17 October 2022, 13:00 UTC+2

Norway
0

			1	2	3
1	(Spain) (Norway)	Rubén García / Nikol Carulla; Mathias Ji Hong / Kristine Ødegårdstuen	21; 4	18; 21	21; 13
2	(Spain) (Norway)	Daniel Franco; Thomas Barth	21; 15	17; 21	21; 16
3	(Spain) (Norway)	Cristina Teruel; Katja Ellingsen	21; 19	22; 20
4	(Spain) (Norway)	Rubén García / Rodrigo Sanjurjo; Thomas Fjeldheim / Mathias Ji Hong	21; 13	21; 14
5	(Spain) (Norway)	Carmen Jiménez / Lucía Rodríguez; Kristine Ødegårdstuen / Katja Ellingsen	24; 22	21; 13

=== Estonia vs Hong Kong ===
Estonia
1
Palacio de Deportes de Santander, Court 4
17 October 2022, 13:00 UTC+2

Hong Kong
4

			1	2	3
1	(Estonia) (Hong Kong)	Tauri Kilk; Lam Ka To	16; 21	21; 12	16; 21
2	(Estonia) (Hong Kong)	Marelle Salu; Liang Ka Wing	10; 21	10; 21
3	(Estonia) (Hong Kong)	Mario Kirisma / Robin Schmalz; Fu Chuen Po / Lam Ka To	21; 19	17; 21	19; 21
4	(Estonia) (Hong Kong)	Kadi Ilves / Marta Emili Teller; Chan Wing Lam / Liang Ka Wing	11; 21	8; 21
5	(Estonia) (Hong Kong)	Tauri Kilk / Elisaveta Berik; Fu Chuen Po / Chan Wing Lam	21; 14	20; 22	22; 20

=== Belgium vs Norway ===
Belgium
4
Palacio de Deportes de Santander, Court 1
18 October 2022, 09:00 UTC+2

Norway
1

			1	2	3
1	(Belgium) (Norway)	Charles Fouyn; Andreas Holmedal	21; 8	21; 13
2	(Belgium) (Norway)	Karla Henry; Kristine Ødegårdstuen	21; 10	21; 16
3	(Belgium) (Norway)	Charles Fouyn / Arnaud Huberty; Thomas Fjeldheim / Mathias Ji Hong	15; 21	13; 21
4	(Belgium) (Norway)	Amber Boonen / Tammi van Wonterghem; Kristine Ødegårdstuen / Katja Ellingsen	21; 14	21; 15
5	(Belgium) (Norway)	Baptiste Rolin / Karla Henry; Mathias Ji Hong / Katja Ellingsen	21; 11	16; 21	21; 17

=== Spain vs Hong Kong ===
Spain
3
Palacio de Deportes de Santander, Court 2
18 October 2022, 09:00 UTC+2

Hong Kong
2

			1	2	3
1	(Spain) (Hong Kong)	Rubén García / Nikol Carulla; Fu Chuen Po / Chan Wing Lam	24; 22	21; 12
2	(Spain) (Hong Kong)	Basilio Porto; Lam Ka To	9; 21	12; 21
3	(Spain) (Hong Kong)	Lucía Rodríguez; Liang Ka Wing	21; 19	21; 16
4	(Spain) (Hong Kong)	Daniel Franco / Rubén García; Fu Chuen Po / Lam Tsz To	21; 12	21; 16
5	(Spain) (Hong Kong)	Nikol Carulla / Lucía Rodríguez; Chan Wing Lam / Liang Ka Wing	13; 21	11; 21

=== Estonia vs Norway ===
Estonia
5
Palacio de Deportes de Santander, Court 1
18 October 2022, 17:00 UTC+2

Norway
0

			1	2	3
1	(Estonia) (Norway)	Tauri Kilk / Elisaveta Berik; Mathias Ji Hong / Kristine Ødegårdstuen	21; 9	21; 13
2	(Estonia) (Norway)	Mario Kirisma; Thomas Barth	21; 17	15; 21	21; 15
3	(Estonia) (Norway)	Marelle Salu; Katja Ellingsen	21; 17	15; 21	24; 22
4	(Estonia) (Norway)	Mario Kirisma / Robin Schmalz; Thomas Fjeldheim / Mathias Ji Hong	21; 15	21; 18
5	(Estonia) (Norway)	Elisaveta Berik / Emili Pärsim; Kristine Ødegårdstuen / Katja Ellingsen	21; 11	21; 7

=== Spain vs Belgium ===
Spain
4
Palacio de Deportes de Santander, Court 2
18 October 2022, 17:00 UTC+2

Belgium
1

			1	2	3
1	(Spain) (Belgium)	Rubén García / Nikol Carulla; Charles Fouyn / Tammi van Wonterghem	21; 8	19; 21	21; 8
2	(Spain) (Belgium)	Rodrigo Sanjurjo; Baptiste Rolin	15; 21	14; 21
3	(Spain) (Belgium)	Lucía Rodríguez; Amber Boonen	21; 14	21; 14
4	(Spain) (Belgium)	Daniel Franco / Rubén García; Arnaud Huberty / Baptiste Rolin	21; 15	21; 17
5	(Spain) (Belgium)	Nikol Carulla / Lucía Rodríguez; Amber Boonen / Tammi van Wonterghem	21; 15	21; 12

=== Hong Kong vs Norway ===
Hong Kong
5
Palacio de Deportes de Santander, Court 1
19 October 2022, 09:00 UTC+2

Norway
0

			1	2	3
1	(Hong Kong) (Norway)	Fu Chuen Po / Lam Tsz To; Thomas Fjeldheim / Mathias Ji Hong	22; 20	21; 14
2	(Hong Kong) (Norway)	Liu Hoi Kiu Anna; Maja Kragholm	21; 4	21; 6
3	(Hong Kong) (Norway)	Lam Ka To; Thomas Barth	21; 11	21; 12
4	(Hong Kong) (Norway)	Chan Wing Lam / Liang Ka Wing; Kristine Ødegårdstuen / Katja Ellingsen	21; 19	21; 16
5	(Hong Kong) (Norway)	Fu Chuen Po / Chan Wing Lam; Andreas Holmedal / Stine Pedersen	21; 13	21; 6

=== Estonia vs Belgium ===
Estonia
3
Palacio de Deportes de Santander, Court 2
19 October 2022, 09:00 UTC+2

Belgium
2

			1	2	3
1	(Estonia) (Belgium)	Marelle Salu; Karla Henry	15; 21	11; 21
2	(Estonia) (Belgium)	Tauri Kilk; Charles Fouyn	21; 23	2; 21
3	(Estonia) (Belgium)	Elisaveta Berik / Emili Pärsim; Amber Boonen / Tammi van Wonterghem	21; 15	21; 16
4	(Estonia) (Belgium)	Mario Kirisma / Robin Schmalz; Arnaud Huberty / Baptiste Rolin	21; 15	21; 12
5	(Estonia) (Belgium)	Tauri Kilk / Elisaveta Berik; Charles Fouyn / Tammi van Wonterghem	21; 12	12; 21	21; 17

=== Belgium vs Hong Kong ===
Belgium
1
Palacio de Deportes de Santander, Court 1
19 October 2022, 17:00 UTC+2

Hong Kong
4

			1	2	3
1	(Belgium) (Hong Kong)	Arnaud Huberty / Amber Boonen; Fu Chuen Po / Chan Wing Lam	7; 21	8; 21
2	(Belgium) (Hong Kong)	Karla Henry; Liang Ka Wing	11; 21	16; 21
3	(Belgium) (Hong Kong)	Charles Fouyn; Lam Ka To	21; 19	16; 21	21; 15
4	(Belgium) (Hong Kong)	Karla Henry / Tammi van Wonterghem; Chan Wing Lam / Liang Ka Wing	13; 21	6; 21
5	(Belgium) (Hong Kong)	Arnaud Huberty / Baptiste Rolin; Fu Chuen Po / Lam Ka To	21; 19	17; 21	16; 21

=== Spain vs Estonia ===
Spain
3
Palacio de Deportes de Santander, Court 2
19 October 2022, 17:00 UTC+2

Estonia
2

			1	2	3
1	(Spain) (Estonia)	Rubén García / Nikol Carulla; Tauri Kilk / Elisaveta Berik	21; 15	16; 21	21; 14
2	(Spain) (Estonia)	Lucía Rodríguez; Marelle Salu	21; 7	21; 6
3	(Spain) (Estonia)	Basilio Porto; Tauri Kilk	13; 21	9; 21
4	(Spain) (Estonia)	Nikol Carulla / Lucía Rodríguez; Emili Pärsim / Marta Emili Teller	21; 9	21; 8
5	(Spain) (Estonia)	Daniel Franco / Rubén García; Mario Kirisma / Robin Schmalz	10; 21	11; 21

== Group G ==
Pos	Team	Pld	W	L	MF	MA	MD	GF	GA	GD	PF	PA	PD	Pts	Qualification
1	United States [5/8]	3	3	0	13	2	+11	28	6	+22	689	434	+255	3	Qualified to knockout stage 1st to 8th
2	Czech Republic [9/16]	3	2	1	9	6	+3	21	13	+8	650	538	+112	2	Qualified to knockout stage 9th to 16th place
3	Sri Lanka [17/38]	3	1	2	8	7	+1	16	16	0	574	535	+39	1	Qualified to knockout stage 17th to 24th place
4	Armenia [17/38]	3	0	3	0	15	−15	0	30	−30	224	630	−406	0	Qualified to knockout stage 25th to 32nd place
5	Turkey [17/38]	0	0	0	0	0	0	0	0	0	0	0	0	0	withdrawn

Source: TS

=== United States vs Armenia ===
United States
5
Palacio de Deportes de Santander, Court 5
17 October 2022, 13:00 UTC+2

Armenia
0

			1	2	3
1	(United States) (Armenia)	Ryan Ma / Natalie Chi; Davit Saribekyan / Svetlana Boyajyan	21; 5	21; 4
2	(United States) (Armenia)	Aaron Bai; Manvel Harutyunyan	21; 5	21; 6
3	(United States) (Armenia)	Ella Lin; Lusine Smbatyan	21; 3	21; 9
4	(United States) (Armenia)	Andre Chim / Adrian King-Sun Mar; Manvel Harutyunyan / Davit Saribekyan	21; 2	21; 5
5	(United States) (Armenia)	Chloe Ho / Kodi Tang Lee; Svetlana Boyajyan / Lusine Smbatyan	21; 9	21; 6

=== Czech Republic vs Sri Lanka ===
Czech Republic
3
Palacio de Deportes de Santander, Court 6
17 October 2022, 13:00 UTC+2

Sri Lanka
2

			1	2	3
1	(Czech Republic) (Sri Lanka)	Adam Šulc / Kateřina Osladilová; Jason Homer / Panchali Adhikari	21; 18	22; 24	23; 25
2	(Czech Republic) (Sri Lanka)	Dominik Kopřiva; Sethum Perera	21; 10	21; 15
3	(Czech Republic) (Sri Lanka)	Petra Maixnerová; Ranithma Liyanage	12; 21	20; 22
4	(Czech Republic) (Sri Lanka)	Dominik Kopřiva / Adam Šulc; Jason Homer / Pulina Wellalage	21; 17	21; 19
5	(Czech Republic) (Sri Lanka)	Lucie Krulová / Petra Maixnerová; Panchali Adhikari / Varangana Jayawardana	21; 12	21; 17

=== Czech Republic vs Armenia ===
Czech Republic
5
Palacio de Deportes de Santander, Court 3
18 October 2022, 09:00 UTC+2

Armenia
0

			1	2	3
1	(Czech Republic) (Armenia)	Adam Šulc / Kateřina Osladilová; Manvel Harutyunyan / Lusine Smbatyan	21; 6	21; 9
2	(Czech Republic) (Armenia)	Daniel Dvořák; Davit Saribekyan	21; 11	21; 6
3	(Czech Republic) (Armenia)	Lucie Krulová; Svetlana Boyajyan	21; 4	21; 6
4	(Czech Republic) (Armenia)	Daniel Dvořák / Dominik Kopřiva; Manvel Harutyunyan / Davit Saribekyan	21; 9	21; 13
5	(Czech Republic) (Armenia)	Lucie Krulová / Petra Maixnerová; Svetlana Boyajyan / Lusine Smbatyan	21; 11	21; 4

=== United States vs Sri Lanka ===
United States
4
Palacio de Deportes de Santander, Court 4
18 October 2022, 09:00 UTC+2

Sri Lanka
1

			1	2	3
1	(United States) (Sri Lanka)	Andre Chim / Adrian King-Sun Mar; Jason Homer / Savinaka Weerasekara	21; 14	21; 19
2	(United States) (Sri Lanka)	Natalie Chi; Ranithma Liyanage	21; 14	21; 16
3	(United States) (Sri Lanka)	Aaron Bai; Sethum Perera	21; 13	19; 21	12; 21
4	(United States) (Sri Lanka)	Chloe Ho / Ella Lin; Varangana Jayawardana / Ranithma Liyanage	21; 8	21; 10
5	(United States) (Sri Lanka)	Ryan Ma / Kodi Tang Lee; Jason Homer / Panchali Adhikari	21; 11	21; 17

=== Sri Lanka vs Armenia ===
Sri Lanka
5
Palacio de Deportes de Santander, Court 3
19 October 2022, 09:00 UTC+2

Armenia
0

			1	2	3
1	(Sri Lanka) (Armenia)	Jason Homer / Panchali Adhikari; Davit Saribekyan / Svetlana Boyajyan	21; 8	21; 10
2	(Sri Lanka) (Armenia)	Ranithma Liyanage; Lusine Smbatyan	21; 9	21; 7
3	(Sri Lanka) (Armenia)	Sethum Kohombage; Manvel Harutyunyan	21; 11	21; 8
4	(Sri Lanka) (Armenia)	Panchali Adhikari / Ranithma Liyanage; Svetlana Boyajyan / Lusine Smbatyan	21; 8	21; 6
5	(Sri Lanka) (Armenia)	Jason Homer / Pulina Wellalage; Manvel Harutyunyan / Davit Saribekyan	21; 16	21; 8

=== United States vs Czech Republic ===
United States
4
Palacio de Deportes de Santander, Court 4
19 October 2022, 09:00 UTC+2

Czech Republic
1

			1	2	3
1	(United States) (Czech Republic)	Adrian King-Sun Mar / Kodi Tang Lee; Adam Šulc / Kateřina Osladilová	21; 12	17; 21	21; 19
2	(United States) (Czech Republic)	Natalie Chi; Lucie Krulová	18; 21	21; 9	18; 21
3	(United States) (Czech Republic)	Ryan Ma; Dominik Kopřiva	17; 21	21; 16	21; 13
4	(United States) (Czech Republic)	Chloe Ho / Ella Lin; Lucie Krulová / Petra Maixnerová	21; 16	21; 15
5	(United States) (Czech Republic)	Andre Chim / Adrian King-Sun Mar; Dominik Kopřiva / Adam Šulc	21; 14	21; 18

== Group H ==
Pos	Team	Pld	W	L	MF	MA	MD	GF	GA	GD	PF	PA	PD	Pts	Qualification
1	Japan [17/38]	3	3	0	15	0	+15	30	0	+30	633	279	+354	3	Qualified to knockout stage 1st to 8th
2	Ukraine [2]	3	2	1	8	7	+1	16	14	+2	506	513	−7	2	Qualified to knockout stage 9th to 16th place
3	Hungary [9/16]	3	1	2	7	8	−1	14	17	−3	515	539	−24	1	Qualified to knockout stage 17th to 24th place
4	Egypt [17/38]	3	0	3	0	15	−15	1	30	−29	327	650	−323	0	Qualified to knockout stage 25th to 32nd place

Source: TS

=== Ukraine vs Japan ===
Ukraine
0
Palacio de Deportes de Santander, Court 7
17 October 2022, 13:00 UTC+2

Japan
5

			1	2	3
1	(Ukraine) (Japan)	Oleksii Titov / Sofiia Lavrova; Seiya Inoue / Kokona Ishikawa	11; 21	12; 21
2	(Ukraine) (Japan)	Mykhailo Vyshnevyi; Daigo Tanioka	10; 21	12; 21
3	(Ukraine) (Japan)	Volodymyr Koluzaiev / Nikita Yeromenko; Koya Iwano / Shunya Ota	12; 21	8; 21
4	(Ukraine) (Japan)	Polina Buhrova; Hina Akechi	12; 21	14; 21
5	(Ukraine) (Japan)	Varvara Frolova / Sofiia Lavrova; Rui Kiyama / Kanano Muroya	6; 21	14; 21

=== Hungary vs Egypt ===
Hungary
5
Palacio de Deportes de Santander, Court 8
17 October 2022, 13:00 UTC+2

Egypt
0

			1	2	3
1	(Hungary) (Egypt)	Keán Gábor Kígyós / Nikol Szabina Vetor; Youssif Mohamed / Ganna Elwazery	21; 6	21; 11
2	(Hungary) (Egypt)	Ádám Könczöl; Mohamed Hegazy	21; 6	21; 9
3	(Hungary) (Egypt)	Tünde Takács; Jana Abdelkader	21; 9	21; 14
4	(Hungary) (Egypt)	Csanád Horváth / Kristóf Tóth; Mohamed Hegazy / Youssif Mohamed	21; 19	21; 19
5	(Hungary) (Egypt)	Petra Hart / Zsófi Szabó; Jana Abdelkader / Ganna Elwazery	20; 22	21; 9	21; 17

=== Ukraine vs Egypt ===
Ukraine
5
Palacio de Deportes de Santander, Court 7
18 October 2022, 13:00 UTC+2

Egypt
0

			1	2	3
1	(Ukraine) (Egypt)	Mykhailo Vyshnevyi; Youssif Mohamed	21; 9	21; 12
2	(Ukraine) (Egypt)	Polina Buhrova; Jana Abdelkader	21; 13	21; 16
3	(Ukraine) (Egypt)	Volodymyr Koluzaiev / Nikita Yeromenko; Mohamed Hegazy / Youssif Mohamed	21; 18	21; 19
4	(Ukraine) (Egypt)	Yevheniia Kantemyr / Sofiia Lavrova; Jana Abdelkader / Ganna Elwazery	21; 10	21; 8
5	(Ukraine) (Egypt)	Oleksii Titov / Varvara Frolova; Seif Omar / Reem Hussien	21; 9	21; 11

=== Hungary vs Japan ===
Hungary
0
Palacio de Deportes de Santander, Court 8
18 October 2022, 13:00 UTC+2

Japan
5

			1	2	3
1	(Hungary) (Japan)	Kristóf Tóth; Sora Ogaki	17; 21	10; 21
2	(Hungary) (Japan)	Tünde Takács; Sorano Yoshikawa	7; 21	5; 21
3	(Hungary) (Japan)	Zsombor Ágai / Miklós Kis-Kasza; Seiya Inoue / Haruki Kawabe	7; 21	12; 21
4	(Hungary) (Japan)	Petra Hart / Tekla Orosz; Kokona Ishikawa / Rui Kiyama	10; 21	6; 21
5	(Hungary) (Japan)	Keán Gábor Kígyós / Nikol Szabina Vetor; Shunya Ota / Kanano Muroya	22; 24	11; 21

=== Ukraine vs Hungary ===
Ukraine
3
Palacio de Deportes de Santander, Court 7
19 October 2022, 13:00 UTC+2

Hungary
2

			1	2	3
1	(Ukraine) (Hungary)	Nikita Yeromenko / Polina Buhrova; Keán Gábor Kígyós / Nikol Szabina Vetor	21; 17	21; 15
2	(Ukraine) (Hungary)	Sofiia Lavrova; Petra Hart	21; 16	21; 18
3	(Ukraine) (Hungary)	Oleksii Titov; Kristóf Tóth	14; 21	10; 21
4	(Ukraine) (Hungary)	Varvara Frolova / Yevheniia Kantemyr; Tekla Orosz / Nikol Szabina Vetor	21; 13	21; 14
5	(Ukraine) (Hungary)	Volodymyr Koluzaiev / Nikita Yeromenko; Keán Gábor Kígyós / Kristóf Tóth	15; 21	20; 22

=== Egypt vs Japan ===
Egypt
0
Palacio de Deportes de Santander, Court 8
19 October 2022, 13:00 UTC+2

Japan
5

			1	2	3
1	(Egypt) (Japan)	Seif Omar / Reem Hussien; Koya Iwano / Riko Kiyose	11; 21	5; 21
2	(Egypt) (Japan)	Ganna Elwazery; Mihane Endo	7; 21	5; 21
3	(Egypt) (Japan)	Seif Omar; Shun Saito	6; 21	7; 21
4	(Egypt) (Japan)	Ganna Elwazery / Reem Hussien; Maya Taguchi / Nao Yamakita	2; 21	3; 21
5	(Egypt) (Japan)	Mohamed Hegazy / Youssif Mohamed; Sora Ogaki / Osuke Sakurai	8; 21	7; 21
