= 2022 BWF World Junior Championships – Teams event =

2022 BWF World Junior Championships

2022 BWF World Junior Championships Teams event
Tournament details
- Dates: 17 – 22 October 2022
- Edition: 22nd
- Level: International
- Nations: 37
- Venue: Palacio de Deportes de Santander
- Location: Santander, Spain
- Winner: South Korea

The teams event of the 2022 BWF World Junior Championships was held from 17 – 22 October 2022. The event is also known as the 2022 Suhandinata Cup. Indonesia was the champion of the last edition held in Kazan, Russia.

38 countries representing all five continental federations are competing in this event. The group draw was done on 10 August. First seed, Indonesia were drawn with Malaysia, Sweden and Latvia in group A. Spain as the host were drawn with Estonia, Belgium, Hong Kong and Norway in group F.

== Seedings ==
The seedings for teams competing in the tournament were released on July 26, 2022. It was based on aggregated points from the best players in the BWF World Junior Ranking. The teams was divided into three pots, with Indonesia and Ukraine were the two top seeds with another 6 teams, another 8 teams were put in the second groups. Twenty-two other teams (seeded 17–38) were seeded into third groups. The draw was held on 10 August in Kuala Lumpur.

=== Group 1 (Seeded 1–8) ===
1. Indonesia
2. Ukraine
3. Spain
4. Germany
5. India
6. Denmark
7. United States
8. England

=== Group 2 (Seeded 9–16) ===
9. Czech Republic
10. Netherlands
11. Thailand
12. Malaysia
13. Slovenia
14. Hungary
15. Peru
16. Estonia

=== Group 3 (Seeded 17–38) ===
17. Japan
18. Belgium
19. Portugal
20. Slovakia
21. ~~Turkey~~ (Withdrew)
22. Australia
23. Canada
24. Finland
25. Norway
26. Sweden
27. Egypt
28. Latvia
29. Singapore
30. South Korea
31. Chinese Taipei
32. Hong Kong
33. Armenia
34. Sri Lanka
35. Iceland
36. Georgia
37. China
38. Tahiti (Debut)

== Group composition ==
The draw for 38 teams competing in the tournament were announced on 10 August 2022.

Group A	Group B	Group C	Group D
1. Indonesia [1]; 2. Malaysia [9/16]; 3. Sweden; 4. Latvia	1. India [5/8]; 2. Slovenia [9/16]; 3. Australia; 4. China; 5. Iceland	1. Germany [3/4]; 2. Peru [9/16]; 3. Portugal; 4. Chinese Taipei; 5. Georgia	1. England [5/8]; 2. Netherlands [9/16]; 3. Tahiti; 4. Singapore; 5. Canada
Group E	Group F	Group G	Group H
1. Denmark [5/8]; 2. Thailand [9/16]; 3. Finland; 4. Slovakia; 5. South Korea	1. Spain [3/4]; 2. Estonia [9/16]; 3. Belgium; 4. Hong Kong; 5. Norway	1. United States [5/8]; 2. Czech Republic [9/16]; 3. Turkey; 4. Sri Lanka; 5. Armenia	1. Ukraine [2]; 2. Hungary [9/16]; 3. Egypt; 4. Japan

== Group stage ==
=== Group A ===
Pos	Team	Pld	W	L	MF	MA	MD	GF	GA	GD	PF	PA	PD	Pts	Qualification	Indonesia national badminton team	Malaysia national badminton team	Sweden national badminton team	Latvia national badminton team
1	Indonesia [1]	3	3	0	14	1	+13	28	3	+25	646	350	+296	3	Qualified to knockout stage 1st to 8th	—	4–1	5–0	5–0
2	Malaysia [9/16]	3	2	1	11	4	+7	23	10	+13	636	475	+161	2	Qualified to knockout stage 9th to 16th place		—	5–0	5–0
3	Sweden [17/38]	3	1	2	5	10	−5	12	21	−9	499	592	−93	1	Qualified to knockout stage 17th to 24th place			—	5–0
4	Latvia [17/38]	3	0	3	0	15	−15	1	30	−29	274	638	−364	0	Qualified to knockout stage 25th to 32nd place				—

Source: TS

=== Group B ===
Pos	Team	Pld	W	L	MF	MA	MD	GF	GA	GD	PF	PA	PD	Pts	Qualification	China national badminton team	India national badminton team	Australia national badminton team	Slovenia national badminton team	Iceland national badminton team
1	China [17/38]	4	4	0	20	0	+20	40	0	+40	840	339	+501	4	Qualified to knockout stage 1st to 8th	—	5–0	5–0	5–0	5–0
2	India [5/8]	4	3	1	13	7	+6	27	14	+13	744	544	+200	3	Qualified to knockout stage 9th to 16th place		—	3–2	5–0	5–0
3	Australia [17/38]	4	2	2	11	9	+2	23	20	+3	725	684	+41	2	Qualified to knockout stage 17th to 24th place			—	4–1	5–0
4	Slovenia [9/16]	4	1	3	6	14	−8	13	31	−18	575	853	−278	1	Qualified to knockout stage 25th to 32nd place				—	5–0
5	Iceland [17/38]	4	0	4	0	20	−20	2	40	−38	412	876	−464	0	Qualified to knockout stage 33rd to 38th place					—

Source: TS

=== Group C ===
Pos	Team	Pld	W	L	MF	MA	MD	GF	GA	GD	PF	PA	PD	Pts	Qualification	Chinese Taipei national badminton team	Germany national badminton team	Peru national badminton team	Portugal national badminton team	Georgia national badminton team
1	Chinese Taipei [17/38]	4	4	0	20	0	+20	40	0	+40	840	370	+470	4	Qualified to knockout stage 1st to 8th	—	5–0	5–0	5–0	5–0
2	Germany [3/4]	4	3	1	13	7	+6	27	17	+10	818	638	+180	3	Qualified to knockout stage 9th to 16th place		—	4–1	4–1	5–0
3	Peru [9/16]	4	2	2	10	10	0	22	20	+2	702	656	+46	2	Qualified to knockout stage 17th to 24th place			—	4–1	5–0
4	Portugal [17/38]	4	1	3	7	13	−6	15	27	−12	626	722	−96	1	Qualified to knockout stage 25th to 32nd place				—	5–0
5	Georgia [17/38]	4	0	4	0	20	−20	0	40	−40	240	840	−600	0	Qualified to knockout stage 33rd to 38th place					—

Source: TS

=== Group D ===
Pos	Team	Pld	W	L	MF	MA	MD	GF	GA	GD	PF	PA	PD	Pts	Qualification	England national badminton team	Canada national badminton team	Singapore national badminton team	Netherlands national badminton team	French Polynesia national badminton team
1	England [5/8]	4	4	0	16	4	+12	32	11	+21	856	634	+222	4	Qualified to knockout stage 1st to 8th	—	3–2	3–2	0–0	5–0
2	Canada [17/38]	4	3	1	15	5	+10	31	11	+20	812	572	+240	3	Qualified to knockout stage 9th to 16th place		—	4–1	4–1	5–0
3	Singapore [17/38]	4	2	2	12	8	+4	26	17	+9	796	698	+98	2	Qualified to knockout stage 17th to 24th place			—	4–1	0–0
4	Netherlands [9/16]	4	1	3	7	13	−6	16	26	−10	638	740	−102	1	Qualified to knockout stage 25th to 32nd place				—	5–0
5	Tahiti [17/38]	4	0	4	0	20	−20	0	40	−40	382	840	−458	0	Qualified to knockout stage 33rd to 38th place					—

Source: TS

=== Group E ===
Pos	Team	Pld	W	L	MF	MA	MD	GF	GA	GD	PF	PA	PD	Pts	Qualification	South Korea national badminton team	Denmark national badminton team	Thailand national badminton team	Finland national badminton team	Slovakia national badminton team
1	South Korea [17/38]	4	4	0	19	1	+18	39	3	+36	881	541	+340	4	Qualified to knockout stage 1st to 8th	—	5–0	4–1	5–0	5–0
2	Denmark [5/8]	4	3	1	13	7	+6	27	18	+9	834	737	+97	3	Qualified to knockout stage 9th to 16th place		—		5–0	5–0
3	Thailand [9/16]	4	2	2	13	7	+6	27	15	+12	789	622	+167	2	Qualified to knockout stage 17th to 24th place		0–0	—	5–0	5–0
4	Finland [17/38]	4	1	3	4	16	−12	10	32	−22	610	807	−197	1	Qualified to knockout stage 25th to 32nd place				—	0–0
5	Slovakia [17/38]	4	0	4	1	19	−18	4	39	−35	477	884	−407	0	Qualified to knockout stage 33rd to 38th place					—

Source: TS

=== Group F ===
Pos	Team	Pld	W	L	MF	MA	MD	GF	GA	GD	PF	PA	PD	Pts	Qualification	Spain national badminton team	Hong Kong national badminton team	Estonia national badminton team	Belgium national badminton team	Norway national badminton team
1	Spain [3/4]	4	4	0	15	5	+10	30	14	+16	824	702	+122	4	Qualified to knockout stage 1st to 8th	—	3–2	0–0	4–1	5–0
2	Hong Kong [17/38]	4	3	1	15	5	+10	32	13	+19	889	680	+209	3	Qualified to knockout stage 9th to 16th place		—	1–4	0–0	5–0
3	Estonia [9/16]	4	2	2	11	9	+2	25	22	+3	806	820	−14	2	Qualified to knockout stage 17th to 24th place			—	3–2	5–0
4	Belgium [17/38]	4	1	3	8	12	−4	19	26	−7	745	812	−67	1	Qualified to knockout stage 25th to 32nd place				—	4–1
5	Norway [17/38]	4	0	4	1	19	−18	7	38	−31	665	915	−250	0	Qualified to knockout stage 33rd to 38th place					—

First match(es) will be played: 17 October 2022. Source: TS

=== Group G ===
Pos	Team	Pld	W	L	MF	MA	MD	GF	GA	GD	PF	PA	PD	Pts	Qualification	United States national badminton team	Czech Republic national badminton team	Sri Lanka national badminton team	Armenia national badminton team	Turkey national badminton team
1	United States [5/8]	3	3	0	13	2	+11	28	6	+22	689	434	+255	3	Qualified to knockout stage 1st to 8th	—	4–1	4–1	5–0	w/d
2	Czech Republic [9/16]	3	2	1	9	6	+3	21	13	+8	650	538	+112	2	Qualified to knockout stage 9th to 16th place		—	3–2	5–0	w/d
3	Sri Lanka [17/38]	3	1	2	8	7	+1	16	16	0	574	535	+39	1	Qualified to knockout stage 17th to 24th place			—	5–0	w/d
4	Armenia [17/38]	3	0	3	0	15	−15	0	30	−30	224	630	−406	0	Qualified to knockout stage 25th to 32nd place				—	w/d
5	Turkey [17/38]	0	0	0	0	0	0	0	0	0	0	0	0	0	withdrawn					—

Source: TS

=== Group H ===
Pos	Team	Pld	W	L	MF	MA	MD	GF	GA	GD	PF	PA	PD	Pts	Qualification	Japan national badminton team	Ukraine national badminton team	Hungary national badminton team	Egypt national badminton team
1	Japan [17/38]	3	3	0	15	0	+15	30	0	+30	633	279	+354	3	Qualified to knockout stage 1st to 8th	—	5–0	5–0	5–0
2	Ukraine [2]	3	2	1	8	7	+1	16	14	+2	506	513	−7	2	Qualified to knockout stage 9th to 16th place		—	3–2	5–0
3	Hungary [9/16]	3	1	2	7	8	−1	14	17	−3	515	539	−24	1	Qualified to knockout stage 17th to 24th place			—	5–0
4	Egypt [17/38]	3	0	3	0	15	−15	1	30	−29	327	650	−323	0	Qualified to knockout stage 25th to 32nd place				—

Source: TS

== Final stage ==
=== 1st to 8th ===
5th–6th place match
B	China	5
G	United States	0
7th–8th place match
D	England	3
F	Spain	0

5th to 8th semifinals
B	China	5
D	England	0
F	Spain	0
G	United States	3

1st to 8th quarterfinals
A	Indonesia	3
B	China	1
C	Chinese Taipei	3
D	England	0
E	South Korea	3
F	Spain	0
G	United States	0
H	Japan	3

1st to 4th semifinals
A	Indonesia	2
C	Chinese Taipei	3
E	South Korea	3
H	Japan	0

Final
C	Chinese Taipei	1
E	South Korea	3

==== 1st to 8th quarterfinals ====
Indonesia
3
Palacio de Deportes de Santander, Court 6
20 October 2022, 13:00 UTC+2

China
1

			1	2	3
1	(Indonesia) (China)	Rafli Ramanda / Az-Azahra Putri Dania; Zhu Yijun / Liu Shengshu	13; 21	15; 21
2	(Indonesia) (China)	Alwi Farhan; Zhu Xuanchen	21; 16	21; 16
3	(Indonesia) (China)	Ester Nurumi Tri Wardoyo; Zhang Xinran	21; 7	21; 10
4	(Indonesia) (China)	Putra Erwiansyah / Rayhan Fadillah; Xu Huayu / Zhu Yijun	21; 17	21; 14
5	(Indonesia) (China)	Meilysa Trias Puspita Sari / Rachel Allessya Rose; Liu Shengshu / Wang Tingge				not played

Chinese Taipei
3
Palacio de Deportes de Santander, Court 7
20 October 2022, 13:00 UTC+2

England
0

			1	2	3
1	(Chinese Taipei) (England)	Huang Tsung-i / Lin Yu-hao; Samuel Jones / Estelle van Leeuwen	13; 21	21; 15	21; 14
2	(Chinese Taipei) (England)	Kuo Kuan-lin; Nadeem Dalvi	21; 13	21; 9
3	(Chinese Taipei) (England)	Wang Pei-yu; Lisa Curtin	21; 15	21; 10
4	(Chinese Taipei) (England)	Huang Jui-hsuan / Tsai Fu-cheng; Blake Hoang / Samuel Jones				not played
5	(Chinese Taipei) (England)	Nicole Gonzales Chan / Yang Chu-yun; Lisa Curtin / Estelle van Leeuwen				not played

South Korea
3
Palacio de Deportes de Santander, Court 8
20 October 2022, 13:00 UTC+2

Spain
0

			1	2	3
1	(South Korea) (Spain)	Kim Byung-jae / Jeong Da-yeon; Ruben Garcia / Lucia Rodriguez	23; 25	21; 10	21; 18
2	(South Korea) (Spain)	Kim Min-seon; Ana Caballero	21; 14	21; 8
3	(South Korea) (Spain)	Kim Byung-jae; Ricardo Rettig	21; 6	21; 7
4	(South Korea) (Spain)	Kim Min-ji / Kim Min-seon; Nikol Carulla / Lucia Rodriguez				not played
5	(South Korea) (Spain)	Cho Song-hyun / Park Beom-soo; Daniel Franco / Ruben Garcia				not played

United States
0
Palacio de Deportes de Santander, Court 9
20 October 2022, 13:00 UTC+2

Japan
3

			1	2	3
1	(United States) (Japan)	Adrian King-Sun Mar; Daigo Tanioka	12; 21	12; 21
2	(United States) (Japan)	Ella Lin; Hina Akechi	19; 21	16; 21
3	(United States) (Japan)	Aaron Bai / Ryan Ma; Koya Iwano / Shunya Ota	10; 21	16; 21
4	(United States) (Japan)	Chloe Ho / Kodi Tang Lee; Rui Kiyama / Kanano Muroya				not played
5	(United States) (Japan)	Andre Chim / Natalie Chi; Seiya Inoue / Kokona Ishikawa				not played

==== 5th to 8th semifinals ====
China
5
Palacio de Deportes de Santander, Court 9
21 October 2022, 13:00 UTC+2

England
0

			1	2	3
1	(China) (England)	Chen Yijiang / Zhang Lejian; Blake Hoang / Samuel Jones	16; 21	21; 17	21; 16
2	(China) (England)	Luo Yi / Wang Yiduo; Lisa Curtin / Estelle van Leeuwen	21; 18	21; 12
3	(China) (England)	Wang Zijun; Nadeem Dalvi	21; 17	21; 19
4	(China) (England)	Yuan Anqi; Leona Lee	21; 10	21; 13
5	(China) (England)	Shen Xuanyao / Li Qian; Samuel Jones / Estelle van Leeuwen	21; 17	19; 21	21; 7

Spain
0
Palacio de Deportes de Santander, Court 2
21 October 2022, 13:00 UTC+2

United States
3

			1	2	3
1	(Spain) (United States)	Ruben Garcia / Nikol Carulla; Ryan Ma / Kodi Tang Lee	19; 21	16; 21
2	(Spain) (United States)	Lucia Rodriguez; Natalie Chi	18; 21	14; 21
3	(Spain) (United States)	Daniel Franco; Ryan Ma	14; 21	18; 21
4	(Spain) (United States)	Nikol Carulla / Lucia Rodriguez; Chloe Ho / Ella Lin				not played
5	(Spain) (United States)	Daniel Franco / Ruben Garcia; Andre Chim / Adrian King-sun Mar				not played

==== 7th–8th place match ====
England
3
Palacio de Deportes de Santander, Court 6
22 October 2022, 09:00 UTC+2

Spain
0

			1	2	3
1	(England) (Spain)	Samuel Jones / Estelle van Leeuwen; Rodrigo Sanjurjo / Carmen Maria Jimenez	21; 10	21; 9
2	(England) (Spain)	Nadeem Dalvi; Basilio Porto	21; 18	21; 8
3	(England) (Spain)	Lisa Curtin; Cristina Teruel	21; 19	21; 15
4	(England) (Spain)	Blake Hoang / Samuel Jones; Ricardo Rettig / Rodrigo Sanjurjo				not played
5	(England) (Spain)	Lisa Curtin / Estelle van Leeuwen; Ana Caballero / Carmen Maria Jimenez				not played

==== 5th–6th place match ====
China
5
Palacio de Deportes de Santander, Court 9
22 October 2022, 09:00 UTC+2

United States
0

			1	2	3
1	(China) (United States)	Pan Yinlong; Ryan Ma	21; 12	12; 21	21; 10
2	(China) (United States)	Yuan Anqi; Natalie Chi	21; 14	21; 9
3	(China) (United States)	Xu Huayu / Zhu Yijun; Andre Chim / Adrian King-sun Mar	21; 17	21; 19
4	(China) (United States)	Liu Shengshu / Wang Tingge; Chloe Ho / Ella Lin	21; 17	21; 10
5	(China) (United States)	Liao Pinyi / Huang Kexin; Aaron Bai / Kodi Tang Lee	21; 8	21; 18

==== 1st to 4th semifinals ====
Indonesia
2
Palacio de Deportes de Santander, Court 1
21 October 2022, 17:00 UTC+2

Chinese Taipei
3

			1	2	3
1	(Indonesia) (Chinese Taipei)	Zaidan Arrafi Nabawi / Felisha Pasaribu; Ting Yen-chen / Yang Chu-yun	21; 15	11; 21	19; 21
2	(Indonesia) (Chinese Taipei)	Muhammad Reza Al Fajri; Kuo Kuan-lin	21; 18	12; 21	18; 21
3	(Indonesia) (Chinese Taipei)	Mutiara Ayu Puspitasari; Ko Ruo-hsuan	15; 21	21; 15	21; 13
4	(Indonesia) (Chinese Taipei)	Putra Erwiansyah / Rayhan Fadillah; Huang Jui-hsuan / Tsai Fu-cheng	21; 14	21; 13
5	(Indonesia) (Chinese Taipei)	Meilysa Trias Puspita Sari / Rachel Allessya Rose; Nicole Gonzalez Chan / Yang Chu-yun	21; 13	16; 21	13; 21

South Korea
3
Palacio de Deportes de Santander, Court 2
21 October 2022, 17:00 UTC+2

Japan
0

			1	2	3
1	(South Korea) (Japan)	Kim Byung-jae; Sora Ogaki	21; 10	10; 21	21; 15
2	(South Korea) (Japan)	Kim Min-seon; Hina Akechi	21; 17	21; 14
3	(South Korea) (Japan)	Cho Song-hyun / Park Beom-soo; Koya Iwano / Shunya Ota	20; 22	21; 16	21; 16
4	(South Korea) (Japan)	Kim Min-ji / Kim Min-seon; Rui Kiyama / Kanano Muroya				not played
5	(South Korea) (Japan)	Kim Byung-jae / Jeong Da-yeon; Seiya Inoue / Kokona Ishikawa				not played

==== Final ====
Chinese Taipei
1
Palacio de Deportes de Santander, Court 1
22 October 2022, 13:00 UTC+2

South Korea
3

			1	2	3
1	(Chinese Taipei) (South Korea)	Kuo Kuan-lin; Kim Byung-jae	21; 14	22; 24	19; 21
2	(Chinese Taipei) (South Korea)	Ko Ruo-hsuan; Kim Min-seon	14; 21	15; 21
3	(Chinese Taipei) (South Korea)	Huang Jui-hsuan / Tsai Fu-cheng; Cho Song-hyun / Park Beom-soo	21; 18	17; 21	21; 13
4	(Chinese Taipei) (South Korea)	Nicole Gonzalez Chan / Yang Chu-yun; Kim Min-ji / Kim Min-seon	18; 21	12; 21
5	(Chinese Taipei) (South Korea)	Ting Yen-chen / Lin Yu-hao; Kim Byung-jae / Jeong Da-yeon				not played

=== 9th to 16th ===
13th–14th place match
B	India	3
F	Hong Kong	0
15th–16th place match
C	Germany	2
G	Czech Republic	3

13th to 16th semifinals
B	India	4
C	Germany	1
F	Hong Kong	3
G	Czech Republic	1

9th to 16th quarterfinals
A	Malaysia	3
B	India	1
C	Germany	0
D	Canada	3
E	Denmark	5
F	Hong Kong	0
G	Czech Republic	0
H	Ukraine	3

9th to 12th semifinals
A	Malaysia	3
D	Canada	2
E	Denmark	4
H	Ukraine	1

9th–10th place match
A	Malaysia	4
E	Denmark	1
11th–12th place match
D	Canada	3
H	Ukraine	0

==== 9th to 16th quarterfinals ====
Malaysia
3
Palacio de Deportes de Santander, Court 2
20 October 2022, 13:00 UTC+2

India
1

			1	2	3
1	(Malaysia) (India)	Justin Hoh; Ayush Shetty	6; 21	21; 12	21; 19
2	(Malaysia) (India)	Siti Nurshuhaini; Anupama Upadhyaya	14; 21	15; 21
3	(Malaysia) (India)	Fazriq Razif / Wong Vin Sean; Nicholas Raj / Tushar Suveer	21; 9	21; 7
4	(Malaysia) (India)	Ong Xin Yee / Carmen Ting; Isharani Baruah / Devika Sihag	21; 10	14; 21	21; 13
5	(Malaysia) (India)	Choi Jian Sheng / Lai Ting Cen; Vignesh Thathineni / Srinidhi Narayanan				not played

Germany
0
Palacio de Deportes de Santander, Court 3
20 October 2022, 13:00 UTC+2

Canada
3

			1	2	3
1	(Germany) (Canada)	Jarne Schlevoigt / Julia Meyer; Josh Nguyen / Jessica Cheng	18; 21	21; 18	18; 21
2	(Germany) (Canada)	Antonia Schaller; Chloe Hoang	14; 21	16; 21
3	(Germany) (Canada)	Karim Krehemeier; Victor Lai	11; 21	11; 21
4	(Germany) (Canada)	Julia Meyer / Cara Siebrecht; Jackie Dent / Christina Lin				not played
5	(Germany) (Canada)	Jarne Schlevoigt / Nikolaj Stupplich; Harold Tan / Alex Xu				not played

Denmark
5
Palacio de Deportes de Santander, Court 4
20 October 2022, 13:00 UTC+2

Hong Kong
0

			1	2	3
1	(Denmark) (Hong Kong)	Jonathan Melgaard / Maria Højlund Tommerup; Lam Tsz To / Liu Hoi Kiu Anna	21; 18	21; 11
2	(Denmark) (Hong Kong)	Frederikke Østergaard; Chan Wing Lam	21; 19	22; 20
3	(Denmark) (Hong Kong)	William Bøgebjerg; Lam Tsz To	21; 19	21; 18
4	(Denmark) (Hong Kong)	Lærke Hvid / Sofie Røjkjær; Chan Wing Lam / Liu Hoi Kiu Anna	21; 16	21; 10
5	(Denmark) (Hong Kong)	Jonathan Melgaard / Mike Vestergaard; Fu Chuen Po / Jason Gunawan	21; 15	21; 18

Czech Republic
0
Palacio de Deportes de Santander, Court 5
20 October 2022, 13:00 UTC+2

Ukraine
3

			1	2	3
1	(Czech Republic) (Ukraine)	Daniel Dvořák / Adam Šulc; Volodymyr Koluzaiev / Nikita Yeromenko	21; 12	9; 21	19; 21
2	(Czech Republic) (Ukraine)	Lucie Krulová; Polina Buhrova	16; 21	12; 21
3	(Czech Republic) (Ukraine)	Dominik Kopřiva; Mykhailo Vyshnevyi	21; 10	20; 22	8; 21
4	(Czech Republic) (Ukraine)	Lucie Krulová / Petra Maixnerová; Varvara Frolova / Sofiia Lavrova				not played
5	(Czech Republic) (Ukraine)	Adam Šulc / Kateřina Osladilová; Nikita Yeromenko / Yevheniia Kantemyr				not played

==== 13th to 16th semifinals ====
India
4
Palacio de Deportes de Santander, Court 3
21 October 2022, 09:00 UTC+2

Germany
1

			1	2	3
1	(India) (Germany)	Samarveer Sharma / Radhika Sharma; Jarne Schlevoigt / Julia Meyer	21; 18	21; 16
2	(India) (Germany)	Bharat Raghav; Sanjeevi Vasudevan	14; 21	21; 17	21; 8
3	(India) (Germany)	Arsh Mohammad / Abhinav Thakur; Jonathan Dresp / Simon Krax	14; 21	22; 24
4	(India) (Germany)	Unnati Hooda; Selin Hübsch	21; 8	21; 6
5	(India) (Germany)	Shreya Balaji / Srinidhi Narayanan; Julia Meyer / Cara Siebrecht	21; 13	21; 13

Hong Kong
3
Palacio de Deportes de Santander, Court 4
21 October 2022, 09:00 UTC+2

Czech Republic
1

			1	2	3
1	(Hong Kong) (Czech Republic)	Jason Gunawan; Dominik Kopřiva	21; 14	21; 13
2	(Hong Kong) (Czech Republic)	Liu Hoi Kiu Anna; Lucie Krulová	17; 21	20; 22
3	(Hong Kong) (Czech Republic)	Fu Chuen Po / Lam Tsz To; Daniel Dvořák / Adam Šulc	13; 21	21; 14	21; 8
4	(Hong Kong) (Czech Republic)	Chan Wing Lam / Liang Ka Wing; Lucie Krulová / Petra Maixnerová	22; 20	18; 21	21; 19
5	(Hong Kong) (Czech Republic)	Lam Ka To / Liu Hoi Kiu Anna; Adam Šulc / Kateřina Osladilová				not played

==== 15th–16th place match ====
Germany
2
Palacio de Deportes de Santander, Court 2
22 October 2022, 09:00 UTC+2

Czech Republic
3

			1	2	3
1	(Germany) (Czech Republic)	Jonathan Dresp / Cara Siebrecht; Adam Šulc / Kateřina Osladilová	17; 21	21; 17	15; 21
2	(Germany) (Czech Republic)	Karim Krehemeier; Daniel Dvořák	24; 22	16; 21	21; 9
3	(Germany) (Czech Republic)	Antonia Schaller; Petra Maixnerová	17; 21	20; 22
4	(Germany) (Czech Republic)	Simon Krax / Nikolaj Stupplich; Dominik Kopřiva / Adam Šulc	22; 20	21; 16
5	(Germany) (Czech Republic)	Selin Hübsch / Julia Meyer; Petra Maixnerová / Kateřina Osladilová	18; 21	20; 22

==== 13th–14th place match ====
India
3
Palacio de Deportes de Santander, Court 3
22 October 2022, 09:00 UTC+2

Hong Kong
0

			1	2	3
1	(India) (Hong Kong)	Rakshitha Sree; Chan Wing Lam	21; 10	21; 18
2	(India) (Hong Kong)	Bharat Raghav; Jason Gunawan	19; 21	21; 19	23; 21
3	(India) (Hong Kong)	Isharani Baruah / Devika Sihag; Chan Wing Lam / Liang Ka Wing	21; 16	21; 16
4	(India) (Hong Kong)	Nicholas Raj / Tushar Suveer; Fu Chuen Po / Lam Ka To				not played
5	(India) (Hong Kong)	Vignesh Thathineni / Srinidhi Narayanan; Lam Tsz To / Chan Wing Lam				not played

==== 9th to 12th semifinals ====
Malaysia
3
Palacio de Deportes de Santander, Court 5
21 October 2022, 09:00 UTC+2

Canada
2

			1	2	3
1	(Malaysia) (Canada)	Fazriq Razif / Wong Vin Sean; Harold Tan / Alex Xu	21; 14	21; 16
2	(Malaysia) (Canada)	Vannee Gobi / Lee Xin Jie; Jessica Cheng / Sophia Nong	21; 17	15; 21	17; 21
3	(Malaysia) (Canada)	Eogene Ewe; Victor Lai	21; 16	21; 12
4	(Malaysia) (Canada)	Siti Zulaikha; Jackie Dent	16; 21	16; 21
5	(Malaysia) (Canada)	Choi Jian Sheng / Lai Ting Cen; Josh Nguyen / Chloe Hoang	21; 15	21; 12

Denmark
4
Palacio de Deportes de Santander, Court 6
21 October 2022, 09:00 UTC+2

Ukraine
1

			1	2	3
1	(Denmark) (Ukraine)	Jonathan Melgaard / Maria Højlund Tommerup; Nikita Yeromenko / Yevheniia Kantemyr	21; 11	23; 21
2	(Denmark) (Ukraine)	Christian Faust Kjær; Mykhailo Vyshnevyi	24; 22	21; 11
3	(Denmark) (Ukraine)	Hjalte Johansen / Jeppe Søby; Volodymyr Koluzaiev / Nikita Yeromenko	21; 10	21; 18
4	(Denmark) (Ukraine)	Frederikke Østergaard; Polina Buhrova	21; 23	21; 13	8; 21
5	(Denmark) (Ukraine)	Maria Højlund Tommerup / Kathrine Vang; Varvara Frolova / Sofiia Lavrova	16; 21	21; 12	22; 20

==== 11th–12th place match ====
Canada
3
Palacio de Deportes de Santander, Court 4
22 October 2022, 09:00 UTC+2

Ukraine
0

			1	2	3
1	(Canada) (Ukraine)	Timothy Lock / Daniel Zhou; Oleksii Titov / Nikita Yeromenko	21; 11	21; 16
2	(Canada) (Ukraine)	Chloe Hoang; Polina Buhrova	21; 19	21; 18
3	(Canada) (Ukraine)	Josh Nguyen; Volodymyr Koluzaiev	21; 10	21; 9
4	(Canada) (Ukraine)	Jackie Dent / Christina Lin; Varvara Frolova / Sofiia Lavrova				not played
5	(Canada) (Ukraine)	Victor Lai / Jessica Cheng; Nikita Yeromenko / Yevheniia Kantemyr				not played

==== 9th–10th place match ====
Malaysia
4
Palacio de Deportes de Santander, Court 5
22 October 2022, 09:00 UTC+2

Denmark
1

			1	2	3
1	(Malaysia) (Denmark)	Choi Jian Sheng / Lai Ting Cen; Christian Faust Kjær / Emma Irring Braüner	21; 10	21; 18
2	(Malaysia) (Denmark)	Siti Zulaikha; Benedicte Sillassen	21; 14	21; 18
3	(Malaysia) (Denmark)	Justin Hoh; Jakob Houe	21; 19	21; 13
4	(Malaysia) (Denmark)	Ong Xin Yee / Carmen Ting; Maria Højlund Tommerup / Kathrine Vang	21; 17	21; 13
5	(Malaysia) (Denmark)	Fazriq Razif / Wong Vin Sean; Jakob Houe / Christian Faust Kjær	15; 21	21; 13	18; 21

=== 17th to 24th ===
21st–22nd place match
A	Sweden	4
F	Estonia	1
23rd–24th place match
C	Peru	3
H	Hungary	2

21st to 24th semifinals
A	Sweden	3
C	Peru	0
F	Estonia	4
H	Hungary	1

17th to 24th quarterfinals
A	Sweden	0
B	Australia	3
C	Peru	2
D	Singapore	3
E	Thailand	5
F	Estonia	0
G	Sri Lanka	3
H	Hungary	1

17th to 20th semifinals
B	Australia	0
D	Singapore	3
E	Thailand	3
G	Sri Lanka	0

17th–18th place match
D	Singapore	1
E	Thailand	3
19th–20th place match
B	Australia	3
G	Sri Lanka	2

==== 17th to 24th quarterfinals ====
Sweden
0
Palacio de Deportes de Santander, Court 7
20 October 2022, 09:00 UTC+2

Australia
3

			1	2	3
1	(Sweden) (Australia)	Mio Molin / Sofia Strömvall; Jack Yu / Catrina Tan	16; 21	21; 12	20; 22
2	(Sweden) (Australia)	Eric Ramstedt; Ricky Tang	15; 21	18; 21
3	(Sweden) (Australia)	Elin Ryberg; Sydney Go	13; 21	22; 24
4	(Sweden) (Australia)	Victor Morskogen / Daniel Ström; Ricky Tang / Otto Zhao				not played
5	(Sweden) (Australia)	Elin Öhling / Elin Ryberg; Dania Nugroho / Catrina Tan				not played

Peru
2
Palacio de Deportes de Santander, Court 8
20 October 2022, 09:00 UTC+2

Singapore
3

			1	2	3
1	(Peru) (Singapore)	Adriano Viale / Rafaela Munar; Safin Noor / Zheng Yan Li	21; 18	21; 13
2	(Peru) (Singapore)	Taisia Kasianov; Joelle Chee	8; 21	9; 21
3	(Peru) (Singapore)	Sharum Durand; Ryan Tan	10; 21	11; 21
4	(Peru) (Singapore)	Fernanda Munar / Rafaela Munar; Chia Xin Ying / Xiao En Heng	21; 10	21; 18
5	(Peru) (Singapore)	Fabrizio Tabini / Adriano Viale; Olivier Foo / Safin Noor	15; 21	19; 21

Thailand
5
Palacio de Deportes de Santander, Court 9
20 October 2022, 09:00 UTC+2

Estonia
0

			1	2	3
1	(Thailand) (Estonia)	Adisak Prasertphetmanee; Andrei Schmidt	21; 8	21; 16
2	(Thailand) (Estonia)	Sarunrak Vitidsarn; Emili Pärsim	21; 7	21; 4
3	(Thailand) (Estonia)	Peeratchai Sukphun / Pakkapon Teeraratsakul; Andrei Schmidt / Hugo Themas	21; 10	21; 10
4	(Thailand) (Estonia)	Thitiphon Klomyong / Sirinad Pirabran; Kadi Ilves / Marta Emili Teller	21; 6	21; 12
5	(Thailand) (Estonia)	Apiluk Gaterahong / Fungfa Korpthammakit; Hugo Themas / Marelle Salu	21; 9	21; 9

Sri Lanka
3
Palacio de Deportes de Santander, Court 1
20 October 2022, 13:00 UTC+2

Hungary
1

			1	2	3
1	(Sri Lanka) (Hungary)	Jason Homer / Panchali Adhikari; Keán Gábor Kígyós / Nikol Szabina Vetor	9; 21	23; 21	17; 21
2	(Sri Lanka) (Hungary)	Sethum Perera; Kristóf Tóth	21; 17	27; 25
3	(Sri Lanka) (Hungary)	Ranithma Liyanage; Tünde Takács	21; 9	21; 17
4	(Sri Lanka) (Hungary)	Jason Homer / Pulina Wellalage; Keán Gábor Kígyós / Kristóf Tóth	15; 21	25; 23	21; 6
5	(Sri Lanka) (Hungary)	Panchali Adhikari / Ranithma Liyanage; Petra Hart / Nikol Szabina Vetor	21; 13	21; 13

==== 21st to 24th semifinals ====
Sweden
3
Palacio de Deportes de Santander, Court 7
20 October 2022, 17:00 UTC+2

Peru
0

			1	2	3
1	(Sweden) (Peru)	Mio Molin / Elin Öhling; Adriano Viale / Rafaela Munar	21; 14	21; 18
2	(Sweden) (Peru)	Khushi Harakamani; Namie Miyahira	21; 14	21; 15
3	(Sweden) (Peru)	Edvard Hylander; Sharum Durand	21; 13	24; 22
4	(Sweden) (Peru)	Elin Öhling / Elin Ryberg; Fernanda Munar / Rafaela Munar				not played
5	(Sweden) (Peru)	Victor Morskogen / Daniel Ström; Sharum Durand / Fabrizio Tabini				not played

Estonia
4
Palacio de Deportes de Santander, Court 1
20 October 2022, 13:00 UTC+2

Hungary
1

			1	2	3
1	(Estonia) (Hungary)	Robin Schmalz / Marta Emili Teller; Keán Gábor Kígyós / Nikol Szabina Vetor	15; 21	15; 21
2	(Estonia) (Hungary)	Tauri Kilk; Ádám Könczöl	21; 9	17; 21	22; 20
3	(Estonia) (Hungary)	Elisaveta Berik; Petra Hart	21; 17	23; 25	21; 19
4	(Estonia) (Hungary)	Andrei Schmidt / Hugo Themas; Zsombor Ágai / Miklós Kis-Kasza	21; 19	21; 17
5	(Estonia) (Hungary)	Kadi Ilves / Marta Emili Teller; Tekla Orosz / Zsófi Szabó	21; 14	21; 13

==== 23rd–24th place match ====
Peru
3
Palacio de Deportes de Santander, Court 7
21 October 2022, 12:30 UTC+2

Hungary
2

			1	2	3
1	(Peru) (Hungary)	Sharum Durand / Namie Miyahira; Miklós Kis-Kasza / Tekla Orosz	21; 19	21; 23	21; 19
2	(Peru) (Hungary)	Fabrizio Tabini; Ádám Könczöl	5; 21	5; 21
3	(Peru) (Hungary)	Fernanda Munar; Zsófi Szabó	21; 14	21; 15
4	(Peru) (Hungary)	Sharum Durand / Fabrizio Tabini; Csanád Horváth / Kristóf Tóth	18; 21	18; 21
5	(Peru) (Hungary)	Fernanda Munar / Rafaela Munar; Tekla Orosz / Zsófi Szabó	21; 18	21; 17

==== 21st–22nd place match ====
Sweden
4
Palacio de Deportes de Santander, Court 8
21 October 2022, 12:30 UTC+2

Estonia
1

			1	2	3
1	(Sweden) (Estonia)	Mio Molin / Sofia Strömvall; Tauri Kilk / Elisaveta Berik	21; 15	14; 21	17; 21
2	(Sweden) (Estonia)	Edvard Hylander; Mario Kirisma	21; 16	16; 21	21; 18
3	(Sweden) (Estonia)	Elin Öhling; Marelle Salu	21; 16	21; 15
4	(Sweden) (Estonia)	Victor Morskogen / Daniel Ström; Andrei Schmidt / Hugo Themas	18; 21	21; 19	21; 18
5	(Sweden) (Estonia)	Elin Öhling / Elin Ryberg; Elisaveta Berik / Emili Pärsim	21; 14	21; 10

==== 17th to 20th semifinals ====
Australia
0
Palacio de Deportes de Santander, Court 1
21 October 2022, 09:00 UTC+2

Singapore
3

			1	2	3
1	(Australia) (Singapore)	Ricky Tang / Otto Zhao; Nge Joo Jie / Johann Prajogo	9; 21	16; 21
2	(Australia) (Singapore)	Catrina Tan; Megan Lee	10; 21	9; 21
3	(Australia) (Singapore)	Jun Goh; Remus Ng	15; 21	11; 21
4	(Australia) (Singapore)	Dania Nugroho / Catrina Tan; Li Zhenghong / Zheng Yan Li				not played
5	(Australia) (Singapore)	Otto Zhao / Yuelin Zhang; Johann Prajogo / Heng Xiao En				not played

Thailand
3
Palacio de Deportes de Santander, Court 2
21 October 2022, 09:00 UTC+2

Sri Lanka
0

			1	2	3
1	(Thailand) (Sri Lanka)	Pakkapon Teeraratsakul / Fungfa Korpthammakit; Jason Homer / Panchali Adhikari	21; 8	21; 18
2	(Thailand) (Sri Lanka)	Panitchaphon Teeraratsakul; Sethum Perera	21; 15	21; 11
3	(Thailand) (Sri Lanka)	Thitiphon Klomyong; Ranithma Liyanage	21; 11	21; 19
4	(Thailand) (Sri Lanka)	Apiluk Gaterahong / Witchaya Jintamuttha; Jason Homer / Pulina Wellalage				not played
5	(Thailand) (Sri Lanka)	Puttita Phanthui / Patida Srisawat; Panchali Adhikari / Ranithma Liyanage				not played

==== 19th–20th place match ====
Australia
3
Palacio de Deportes de Santander, Court 4
21 October 2022, 17:05 UTC+2

Sri Lanka
2

			1	2	3
1	(Australia) (Sri Lanka)	Jack Yu / Dania Nugroho; Jason Homer / Panchali Adhikari	21; 16	12; 21	21; 18
2	(Australia) (Sri Lanka)	Sydney Go; Ranithma Liyanage	21; 17	20; 22	11; 21
3	(Australia) (Sri Lanka)	Jack Yu; Sethum Perera	22; 20	13; 21	21; 15
4	(Australia) (Sri Lanka)	Sydney Go / Yuelin Zhang; Panchali Adhikari / Varangana Jayawardana	26; 24	21; 23	8; 21
5	(Australia) (Sri Lanka)	Ricky Tang / Otto Xing De Zhao; Jason Homer / Savinaka Weerasekara	21; 12	21; 13

==== 17th–18th place match ====
Singapore
1
Palacio de Deportes de Santander, Court 5
21 October 2022, 17:05 UTC+2

Thailand
3

			1	2	3
1	(Singapore) (Thailand)	Marcus Lau; Adisak Prasertphetmanee	21; 8	21; 11
2	(Singapore) (Thailand)	Megan Lee; Sarunrak Vitidsarn	21; 16	15; 21	13; 21
3	(Singapore) (Thailand)	Foo See Git / Safin Noor; Peeratchai Sukphun / Pakkapon Teeraratsakul	10; 21	13; 21
4	(Singapore) (Thailand)	Li Zhenghong / Li Zhengyan; Thitiphon Klomyong / Sirinad Pirabran	9; 21	9; 21
5	(Singapore) (Thailand)	Johann Prajogo / Heng Xiao En; Witchaya Jintamuttha / Patida Srisawat				not played

=== 25th to 32nd ===
29th–30th place match
C	Portugal	3
H	Belgium	2
31st–32nd place match
A	Latvia	4
F	Armenia	1

29th to 32nd semifinals
A	Latvia	2
C	Portugal	3
F	Belgium	5
G	Armenia	0

25th to 32nd quarterfinals
A	Latvia	1
B	Slovenia	4
C	Portugal	1
D	Netherlands	3
E	Finland	3
F	Belgium	2
G	Armenia	0
H	Egypt	3

25th to 28th semifinals
B	Slovenia	1
D	Netherlands	4
E	Finland	3
H	Egypt	0

25th–26th place match
D	Netherlands	2
E	Finland	3
27th–28th place match
B	Slovenia	5
H	Egypt	0

==== 25th to 32nd quarterfinals ====
Latvia
1
Palacio de Deportes de Santander, Court 3
20 October 2022, 09:00 UTC+2

Slovenia
4

			1	2	3
1	(Latvia) (Slovenia)	Rihards Zugs / Arina Babre; Jaka Perič Marovt / Anja Jordan	15; 21	7; 21
2	(Latvia) (Slovenia)	Anna Kupča; Špela Alič	14; 21	21; 14	21; 18
3	(Latvia) (Slovenia)	Toms Sala; Ziga Podgoršek	18; 21	5; 21
4	(Latvia) (Slovenia)	Anna Kupča / Annija Rulle-Titava; Špela Alič / Anja Jordan	8; 21	18; 21
5	(Latvia) (Slovenia)	Edžus Meirans / Rihards Zugs; Anel Hac Györköš / Mark Koroša	12; 21	8; 21

Portugal
1
Palacio de Deportes de Santander, Court 4
20 October 2022, 09:00 UTC+2

Netherlands
3

			1	2	3
1	(Portugal) (Netherlands)	Madalena Fortunato; Flora Wang	19; 21	21; 15	21; 15
2	(Portugal) (Netherlands)	Santiago Batalha; Noah Haase	12; 21	15; 21
3	(Portugal) (Netherlands)	Margarida Cabaço / Madalena Fortunato; Kirsten de Wit / Meerte Loos	18; 21	18; 21
4	(Portugal) (Netherlands)	Santiago Batalha / Dinis Maia; Casper Spaans / Rune van Dalm	15; 21	7; 21
5	(Portugal) (Netherlands)	Gonçalo Silva / Margarida Cabaço; Noah Haase / Kirsten de Wit				not played

Finland
3
Palacio de Deportes de Santander, Court 5
20 October 2022, 09:00 UTC+2

Belgium
2

			1	2	3
1	(Finland) (Belgium)	Kaiwen Li / Nella Nyqvist; Baptiste Rolin / Tammi van Wonterghem	24; 22	21; 14
2	(Finland) (Belgium)	Aleksi Mäki; Arnaud Huberty	21; 14	21; 18
3	(Finland) (Belgium)	Nella Nyqvist; Karla Henry	21; 10	21; 15
4	(Finland) (Belgium)	Rasmus Andersson / Niilo Nyqvist; Charles Fouyn / Baptiste Rolin	19; 21	11; 21
5	(Finland) (Belgium)	Petra Saarnivaara / Oona Tapola; Amber Boonen / Tammi van Wonterghem	6; 21	13; 21

Armenia
0
Palacio de Deportes de Santander, Court 6
20 October 2022, 09:00 UTC+2

Egypt
3

			1	2	3
1	(Armenia) (Egypt)	Davit Saribekyan / Svetlana Boyajyan; Mohamed Hegazy / Ganna Elwazery	11; 21	11; 21
2	(Armenia) (Egypt)	Manvel Harutyunyan; Youssif Mohamed	21; 16	13; 21	17; 21
3	(Armenia) (Egypt)	Lusine Smbatyan; Jana Abdelkader	18; 21	7; 21
4	(Armenia) (Egypt)	Manvel Harutyunyan / Davit Saribekyan; Mohamed Hegazy / Youssif Mohamed				not played
5	(Armenia) (Egypt)	Svetlana Boyajyan / Lusine Smbatyan; Jana Abdelkader / Ganna Elwazery				not played

==== 29th to 32nd semifinals ====
Latvia
2
Palacio de Deportes de Santander, Court 3
20 October 2022, 17:00 UTC+2

Portugal
3

			1	2	3
1	(Latvia) (Portugal)	Rihards Zugs / Annija Rulle-Titava; Gonçalo Silva / Margarida Cabaço	13; 21	15; 21
2	(Latvia) (Portugal)	Anna Kupča; Madalena Fortunato	21; 19	21; 19
3	(Latvia) (Portugal)	Toms Sala; Santiago Batalha	9; 21	6; 21
4	(Latvia) (Portugal)	Anna Kupča / Annija Rulle-Titava; Madalena Fortunato / Marta Sousa	21; 0	21; 0
5	(Latvia) (Portugal)	Edžus Meirans / Rihards Zugs; Santiago Batalha / Dinis Maia	10; 21	16; 21

Belgium
5
Palacio de Deportes de Santander, Court 4
20 October 2022, 17:00 UTC+2

Armenia
0

			1	2	3
1	(Belgium) (Armenia)	Charles Fouyn / Karla Henry; Manvel Harutyunyan / Lusine Smbatyan	21; 6	21; 8
2	(Belgium) (Armenia)	Baptiste Rolin; Davit Saribekyan	21; 17	21; 8
3	(Belgium) (Armenia)	Amber Boonen; Svetlana Boyajyan	21; 7	21; 12
4	(Belgium) (Armenia)	Arnaud Huberty / Baptiste Rolin; Manvel Harutyunyan / Davit Saribekyan	21; 13	21; 9
5	(Belgium) (Armenia)	Karla Henry / Tammi van Wonterghem; Svetlana Boyajyan / Lusine Smbatyan	21; 4	21; 6

==== 31st–32nd place match ====
Latvia
4
Palacio de Deportes de Santander, Court 3
21 October 2022, 13:00 UTC+2

Armenia
1

			1	2	3
1	(Latvia) (Armenia)	Rihards Zugs / Anna Kupča; Davit Saribekyan / Lusine Smbatyan	21; 6	21; 12
2	(Latvia) (Armenia)	Edžus Meirans; Manvel Harutyunyan	21; 17	19; 21	24; 22
3	(Latvia) (Armenia)	Arina Babre; Svetlana Boyajyan	21; 17	21; 17
4	(Latvia) (Armenia)	Toms Sala / Rihards Zugs; Manvel Harutyunyan / Davit Saribekyan	21; 14	14; 21	20; 22
5	(Latvia) (Armenia)	Anna Kupča / Annija Rulle-Titava; Svetlana Boyajyan / Lusine Smbatyan	21; 9	21; 12

==== 29th–30th place match ====
Portugal
3
Palacio de Deportes de Santander, Court 4
21 October 2022, 13:00 UTC+2

Belgium
2

			1	2	3
1	(Portugal) (Belgium)	Gonçalo Silva / Margarida Cabaço; Baptiste Rolin / Karla Henry	11; 21	13; 21
2	(Portugal) (Belgium)	Madalena Fortunato; Amber Boonen	16; 21	21; 17	21; 14
3	(Portugal) (Belgium)	Santiago Batalha; Arnaud Huberty	21; 19	21; 17
4	(Portugal) (Belgium)	Madalena Fortunato / Beatriz Roberto; Amber Boonen / Tammi van Wonterghem	21; 15	17; 21	21; 9
5	(Portugal) (Belgium)	Santiago Batalha / Dinis Maia; Charles Fouyn / Baptiste Rolin	17; 21	12; 21

==== 25th to 28th semifinals ====
Slovenia
1
Palacio de Deportes de Santander, Court 5
20 October 2022, 17:00 UTC+2

Netherlands
4

			1	2	3
1	(Slovenia) (Netherlands)	Mark Koroša / Kim Matovič; Noah Haase / Kirsten de Wit	11; 21	6; 21
2	(Slovenia) (Netherlands)	Nika Bedič; Flora Wang	23; 21	5; 21	8; 21
3	(Slovenia) (Netherlands)	Mark Koroša; Noah Haase	15; 21	21; 16	21; 0
4	(Slovenia) (Netherlands)	Špela Alič / Anja Jordan; Kirsten de Wit / Meerte Loos	15; 21	21; 11	19; 21
5	(Slovenia) (Netherlands)	Jan Krumpak / Kevin Lin Lenarčič; Casper Spaans / Rune van Dalm	17; 21	10; 21

Finland
3
Palacio de Deportes de Santander, Court 6
20 October 2022, 17:00 UTC+2

Egypt
0

			1	2	3
1	(Finland) (Egypt)	Kaiwen Li / Sarah Asfar; Youssif Mohamed / Ganna Elwazery	21; 15	13; 21	21; 7
2	(Finland) (Egypt)	Aleksi Mäki; Mohamed Hegazy	15; 21	21; 8	21; 15
3	(Finland) (Egypt)	Nella Nyqvist; Jana Abdelkader	21; 13	21; 9
4	(Finland) (Egypt)	Kaiwen Li / Aleksi Mäki; Mohamed Hegazy / Youssif Mohamed				not played
5	(Finland) (Egypt)	Petra Saarnivaara / Oona Tapola; Jana Abdelkader / Ganna Elwazery				not played

==== 27th–28th place match ====
Slovenia
5
Palacio de Deportes de Santander, Court 5
21 October 2022, 13:00 UTC+2

Egypt
0

			1	2	3
1	(Slovenia) (Egypt)	Jaka Perič Marovt / Anja Jordan; Youssif Mohamed / Ganna Elwazery	21; 12	21; 19
2	(Slovenia) (Egypt)	Ziga Podgoršek; Mohamed Hegazy	21; 13	22; 20
3	(Slovenia) (Egypt)	Kim Matovič; Jana Abdelkader	21; 14	19; 21	22; 20
4	(Slovenia) (Egypt)	Anel Hac Györköš / Mark Koroša; Mohamed Hegazy / Youssif Mohamed	21; 9	21; 13
5	(Slovenia) (Egypt)	Špela Alič / Anja Jordan; Jana Abdelkader / Ganna Elwazery	21; 11	21; 9

==== 25th–26th place match ====
Netherlands
2
Palacio de Deportes de Santander, Court 6
21 October 2022, 13:00 UTC+2

Finland
3

			1	2	3
1	(Netherlands) (Finland)	Casper Spaans / Kirsten de Wit; Rasmus Andersson / Sarah Asfar	16; 21	15; 21
2	(Netherlands) (Finland)	Flora Wang; Petra Saarnivaara	19; 21	21; 14	21; 9
3	(Netherlands) (Finland)	Rune van Dalm; Niilo Nyqvist	18; 21	14; 21
4	(Netherlands) (Finland)	Kirsten de Wit / Meerte Loos; Sarah Asfar / Oona Tapola	21; 9	24; 22
5	(Netherlands) (Finland)	Casper Spaans / Rune van Dalm; Rasmus Andersson / Aleksi Mäki	16; 21	21; 18	17; 21

=== 33rd to 37th ===
Pos	Team	Pld	W	L	MF	MA	MD	GF	GA	GD	PF	PA	PD	Pts	Slovakia	Norway	French Polynesia	Iceland	Georgia
1	Slovakia	4	4	0	17	3	+14	35	8	+27	857	545	+312	4	—	3–2	5–0	4–1	5–0
2	Norway	4	3	1	17	3	+14	35	7	+28	829	589	+240	3		—	5–0	5–0	5–0
3	Tahiti	4	2	2	8	12	−4	19	26	−7	783	816	−33	2			—	3–2	5–0
4	Iceland	4	1	3	8	12	−4	17	27	−10	742	795	−53	1				—	5–0
5	Georgia	4	0	4	0	20	−20	2	40	−38	408	874	−466	0					—

First match(es) will be played: 20 October 2022. Source: TS

Iceland
0
Palacio de Deportes de Santander, Court 1
20 October 2022, 09:00 UTC+2

Norway
5

			1	2	3
1	(Iceland) (Norway)	Eiríkur Tumi Briem / Hrafnhildur Edda Ingvarsdóttir; Thomas Fjeldheim / Kristine Ødegårdstuen	14; 21	14; 21
2	(Iceland) (Norway)	Lilja Bu; Katja Ellingsen	16; 21	16; 21
3	(Iceland) (Norway)	Gabríel Ingi Helgason; Andreas Holmedal	15; 21	13; 21
4	(Iceland) (Norway)	Lilja Bu / Hrafnhildur Edda Ingvarsdóttir; Maja Krgholm / Stine Pedersen	19; 21	14; 21
5	(Iceland) (Norway)	Guðmundur Adam Gígja / Gabríel Ingi Helgason; Thomas Fjeldheim / Mathias Ji Hong	14; 21	18; 21

Georgia
0
Palacio de Deportes de Santander, Court 2
20 October 2022, 09:00 UTC+2

Slovakia
5

			1	2	3
1	(Georgia (country)) (Slovakia)	Daniel Tatevosyan; Richard Pavlík	6; 21	6; 21
2	(Georgia (country)) (Slovakia)	Elisabed Zumbulidze; Lea Výbochová	13; 21	6; 21
3	(Georgia (country)) (Slovakia)	Daniel Tatevosyan / Garri Ter-Karapetyan; Sebastián Kadlec / Simeon Suchý	4; 21	4; 21
4	(Georgia (country)) (Slovakia)	Marina Ovasapyan / Elisabed Zumbulidze; Sofia Slosiariková / Michaela Telehaničová	3; 21	10; 21
5	(Georgia (country)) (Slovakia)	Garri Ter-Karapetyan / Marina Ovasapyan; Richard Pavlík / Lea Výbochová	2; 21	3; 21

Tahiti
0
Palacio de Deportes de Santander, Court 1
20 October 2022, 17:00 UTC+2

Norway
5

			1	2	3
1	(French Polynesia) (Norway)	Kaihei Teiefitu / Maeva Gaillard; Mathias Ji Hong / Kristine Ødegårdstuen	14; 21	12; 21
2	(French Polynesia) (Norway)	Elias Maublanc; Andreas Holmedal	13; 21	8; 21
3	(French Polynesia) (Norway)	Jenica Lesourd; Katja Ellingsen	15; 21	9; 21
4	(French Polynesia) (Norway)	Kaihei Teiefitu / Heiva Yvonet; Thomas Fjeldheim / Mathias Ji Hong	11; 21	13; 21
5	(French Polynesia) (Norway)	Heirautea Curet / Maeva Gaillard; Maja Kragholm / Stine Pedersen	20; 22	21; 18	17; 21

Iceland
1
Palacio de Deportes de Santander, Court 2
20 October 2022, 17:00 UTC+2

Slovakia
4

			1	2	3
1	(Iceland) (Slovakia)	Eiríkur Tumi Briem / Lilja Bu; Simeon Suchý / Michaela Telehaničová	7; 21	12; 21
2	(Iceland) (Slovakia)	Gabríel Ingi Helgason; Sebastián Kadlec	14; 21	14; 21
3	(Iceland) (Slovakia)	Hrafnhildur Edda Ingvarsdóttir; Olívia Kadlecová	12; 21	7; 21
4	(Iceland) (Slovakia)	Eiríkur Tumi Briem / Guðmundur Adam Gígja; Richard Pavlík / Simeon Suchý	21; 17	12; 21	21; 14
5	(Iceland) (Slovakia)	Lilja Bu / Hrafnhildur Edda Ingvarsdóttir; Olívia Kadlecová / Lea Výbochová	8; 21	9; 21

Georgia
0
Palacio de Deportes de Santander, Court 1
21 October 2022, 08:30 UTC+2

Norway
5

			1	2	3
1	(Georgia (country)) (Norway)	Daniel Tatevosyan / Marina Ovasapyan; Andreas Holmedal / Stine Pedersen	4; 21	4; 21
2	(Georgia (country)) (Norway)	Garri Ter-Karapetyan; Thomas Fjeldheim	6; 21	10; 21
3	(Georgia (country)) (Norway)	Elisabed Zumbulidze; Maja Krgholm	5; 21	8; 21
4	(Georgia (country)) (Norway)	Daniel Tatevosyan / Garri Ter-Karapetyan; Thomas Barth / Andreas Holmedal	12; 21	4; 21
5	(Georgia (country)) (Norway)	Marina Ovasapyan / Elisabed Zumbulidze; Maja Krgholm / Stine Pedersen	13; 21	17; 21

Iceland
2
Palacio de Deportes de Santander, Court 2
21 October 2022, 08:30 UTC+2

Tahiti
3

			1	2	3
1	(Iceland) (French Polynesia)	Guðmundur Adam Gígja / Hrafnhildur Edda Ingvarsdóttir; Kaihei Teiefitu / Maeva Gaillard	11; 21	20; 22
2	(Iceland) (French Polynesia)	Lilja Bu; Heirautea Curet	21; 19	17; 21	19; 21
3	(Iceland) (French Polynesia)	Gabríel Ingi Helgason; Kaihei Teiefitu	21; 15	19; 21	21; 19
4	(Iceland) (French Polynesia)	Lilja Bu / Hrafnhildur Edda Ingvarsdóttir; Heirautea Curet / Maeva Gaillard	21; 23	15; 21
5	(Iceland) (French Polynesia)	Eiríkur Tumi Briem / Guðmundur Adam Gígja; Elias Maublanc / Heiva Yvonet	21; 17	21; 10

Slovakia
3
Palacio de Deportes de Santander, Court 6
21 October 2022, 17:05 UTC+2

Norway
2

			1	2	3
1	(Slovakia) (Norway)	Simeon Suchý / Michaela Telehaničová; Mathias Ji Hong / Kristine Ødegårdstuen	21; 16	21; 11
2	(Slovakia) (Norway)	Richard Pavlík; Thomas Barth	15; 21	12; 21
3	(Slovakia) (Norway)	Sofia Slosiariková; Katja Ellingsen	21; 7	21; 5
4	(Slovakia) (Norway)	Sebastián Kadlec / Simeon Suchý; Thomas Fjeldheim / Mathias Ji Hong	14; 21	17; 21
5	(Slovakia) (Norway)	Olívia Kadlecová / Lea Výbochová; Kristine Ødegårdstuen / Katja Ellingsen	15; 21	22; 20	21; 16

Georgia
0
Palacio de Deportes de Santander, Court 9
21 October 2022, 17:05 UTC+2

Tahiti
5

			1	2	3
1	(Georgia (country)) (French Polynesia)	Garri Ter-Karapetyan / Elisabed Zumbulidze; Kaihei Teiefitu / Maeva Gaillard	11; 21	9; 21
2	(Georgia (country)) (French Polynesia)	Daniel Tatevosyan; Elias Maublanc	12; 21	12; 21
3	(Georgia (country)) (French Polynesia)	Marina Ovasapyan; Heirautea Curet	1; 21	9; 21
4	(Georgia (country)) (French Polynesia)	Daniel Tatevosyan / Garri Ter-Karapetyan; Kaihei Teiefitu / Heiva Yvonet	14; 21	21; 16	12; 21
5	(Georgia (country)) (French Polynesia)	Marina Ovasapyan / Elisabed Zumbulidze; Heirautea Curet / Maeva Gaillard	22; 24	10; 21

Iceland
5
Palacio de Deportes de Santander, Court 7
22 October 2022, 08:30 UTC+2

Georgia
0

			1	2	3
1	(Iceland) (Georgia (country))	Gabríel Ingi Helgason / Lilja Bu; Garri Ter-Karapetyan / Marina Ovasapyan	21; 6	21; 10
2	(Iceland) (Georgia (country))	Hrafnhildur Edda Ingvarsdóttir; Elisabed Zumbulidze	21; 17	15; 21	21; 18
3	(Iceland) (Georgia (country))	Gabríel Ingi Helgason; Daniel Tatevosyan	21; 9	21; 9
4	(Iceland) (Georgia (country))	Lilja Bu / Hrafnhildur Edda Ingvarsdóttir; Marina Ovasapyan / Elisabed Zumbulidze	21; 9	21; 15
5	(Iceland) (Georgia (country))	Eiríkur Tumi Briem / Guðmundur Adam Gígja; Daniel Tatevosyan / Garri Ter-Karapetyan	21; 13	21; 8

Tahiti
0
Palacio de Deportes de Santander, Court 8
22 October 2022, 08:30 UTC+2

Slovakia
5

			1	2	3
1	(French Polynesia) (Slovakia)	Elias Maublanc; Simeon Suchý	18; 21	14; 21
2	(French Polynesia) (Slovakia)	Heirautea Curet; Olívia Kadlecová	15; 21	21; 17	19; 21
3	(French Polynesia) (Slovakia)	Kaihei Teiefitu / Heiva Yvonet; Sebastián Kadlec / Simeon Suchý	11; 21	16; 21
4	(French Polynesia) (Slovakia)	Heirautea Curet / Maeva Gaillard; Sofia Slosiariková / Michaela Telehaničová	14; 21	19; 21
5	(French Polynesia) (Slovakia)	Elias Maublanc / Jenica Lesourd; Richard Pavlík / Lea Výbochová	9; 21	15; 21

== Final standings ==
1. South Korea
2. Chinese Taipei
3. Indonesia
3. Japan
5. China
6. United States
7. England
8. Spain
9. Malaysia
10. Denmark
11. Canada
12. Ukraine
13. India
14. Hong Kong
15. Czech Republic
16. Germany
17. Thailand
18. Singapore
19. Australia
20. Sri Lanka
21. Sweden
22. Estonia
23. Peru
24. Hungary
25. Finland
26. Netherlands
27. Slovenia
28. Egypt
29. Portugal
30. Belgium
31. Latvia
32. Armenia
33. Slovakia
34. Norway
35. Tahiti
36. Iceland
37. Georgia
38. ~~Turkey~~ (Withdrew)
