= Rayhan Fadillah =

Indonesian badminton player (born 2004)

Personal information
- Born: Muhammad Rayhan Nur Fadillah; 6 May 2004 (age 22) Tanah Bumbu, South Kalimantan, Indonesia

Sport
- Country: Indonesia
- Sport: Badminton
- Handedness: Right

Men's doubles
- Highest ranking: 59 (with Rahmat Hidayat, 27 June 2023)
- BWF profile
Medal record
Men's badminton
Representing Indonesia
World Junior Championships
Bronze medal – third place	2022 Santander	Mixed team

Muhammad Rayhan Nur Fadillah (born 6 May 2004) is an Indonesian badminton player who is affiliated with the Djarum club. He was part of Indonesia team that won a bronze medal at the 2022 World Junior Championships.

== Career ==
Fadillah joined the Djarum badminton club in 2015.

=== 2020–2021 ===
Together with Rahmat Hidayat, they won their first junior tournament at the Dutch Junior International Grand Prix in 2020 after beating junior rivals Junaidi Arif and Muhammad Haikal. In that same year, Hidayat and Fadillah were also runners-up at the German Junior International, losing in the finals to their opponents whom they previously beaten in the Dutch Junior.

In 2021, they were runners-up at the Denmark Junior International Series.

=== 2022 ===
In 2022, Fadillah and Hidayat won the Lithuanian International after beating Kenji Lovang and Léo Rossi in the final. In October, he participated in the Suhandinata Cup, where he won all his matches during the competition, and Indonesia team captured the bronze medal.

In late November, they participated in Bahrain tournament and reach semi-finals of Bahrain International Series and won the Bahrain International Challenge.

=== 2023 ===
In January, Fadillah and Hidayat played at the home tournament, Indonesia Masters, but had to lose in the qualifying round. In the next tournament, they lost in the quarter-finals of the Thailand Masters from 3rd seed fellow Indonesian pair Muhammad Shohibul Fikri and Bagas Maulana in rubber games.

== Achievements ==
=== BWF International Challenge/Series (2 titles) ===
Men's doubles
Year	Tournament	Partner	Opponent	Score	Result	Ref.
2022	Lithuanian International	(Indonesia) Rahmat Hidayat	(France) Kenji Lovang (France) Léo Rossi	21–9, 21–13	(gold) Winner	
2022	Bahrain International	(Indonesia) Rahmat Hidayat	(Thailand) Chaloempon Chaloenkitamorn (Thailand) Nanthakarn Yordphaisong	21–13, 21–17	(gold) Winner	

BWF International Challenge tournament
BWF International Series tournament
BWF Future Series tournament

=== BWF Junior International (1 title, 2 runners-up) ===
Boys' doubles
Year	Tournament	Partner	Opponent	Score	Result	Ref.
2020	Dutch Junior	(Indonesia) Rahmat Hidayat	(Malaysia) Junaidi Arif (Malaysia) Muhammad Haikal	25–23, 24–22	(gold) Winner	
2020	German Junior	(Indonesia) Rahmat Hidayat	(Malaysia) Junaidi Arif (Malaysia) Muhammad Haikal	21–13, 18–21, 16–21	(silver) Runner-up	
2021	Denmark Junior	(Indonesia) Rahmat Hidayat	(Denmark) William Kryger Boe (Denmark) Christian Faust Kjær	21–17, 22–24, 13–21	(silver) Runner-up	

BWF Junior International Grand Prix tournament
BWF Junior International Challenge tournament
BWF Junior International Series tournament
BWF Junior Future Series tournament

== Performance timeline ==
Key

W	Won	F	Finalist	SF	Semi-finalist
QF	Quarter-finalist	#R	Rounds 4, 3, 2, 1	RR	Round-robin stage
Q#	Qualification round	A	Absent	w/d	Withdrew
G	Gold	S	Silver	B	Bronze
NH	Not held	N/A	Not applicable	DNQ	Did not qualify

=== National team ===
- Junior level

Team events	2022	Ref
World Junior Championships	B	

=== Individual competitions ===
==== Senior level ====
- Men's doubles

Tournament	BWF World Tour	Best	Ref
Tournament	2023	Best	Ref
Indonesia Masters	Q2	Q2 ('23)	
Thailand Masters	QF	QF ('23)	
Ruichang China Masters	w/d	—	
Indonesia Masters Super 100	2R	2R ('23)	
Syed Modi International	1R	1R ('23)	
Guwahati Masters	QF	QF ('23)	
Year-end ranking	98	59	
