= Palacio de Deportes de Santander =

Arena in Santander, Cantabria, Spain

Coordinates: 43.475599°N 3.79593°W

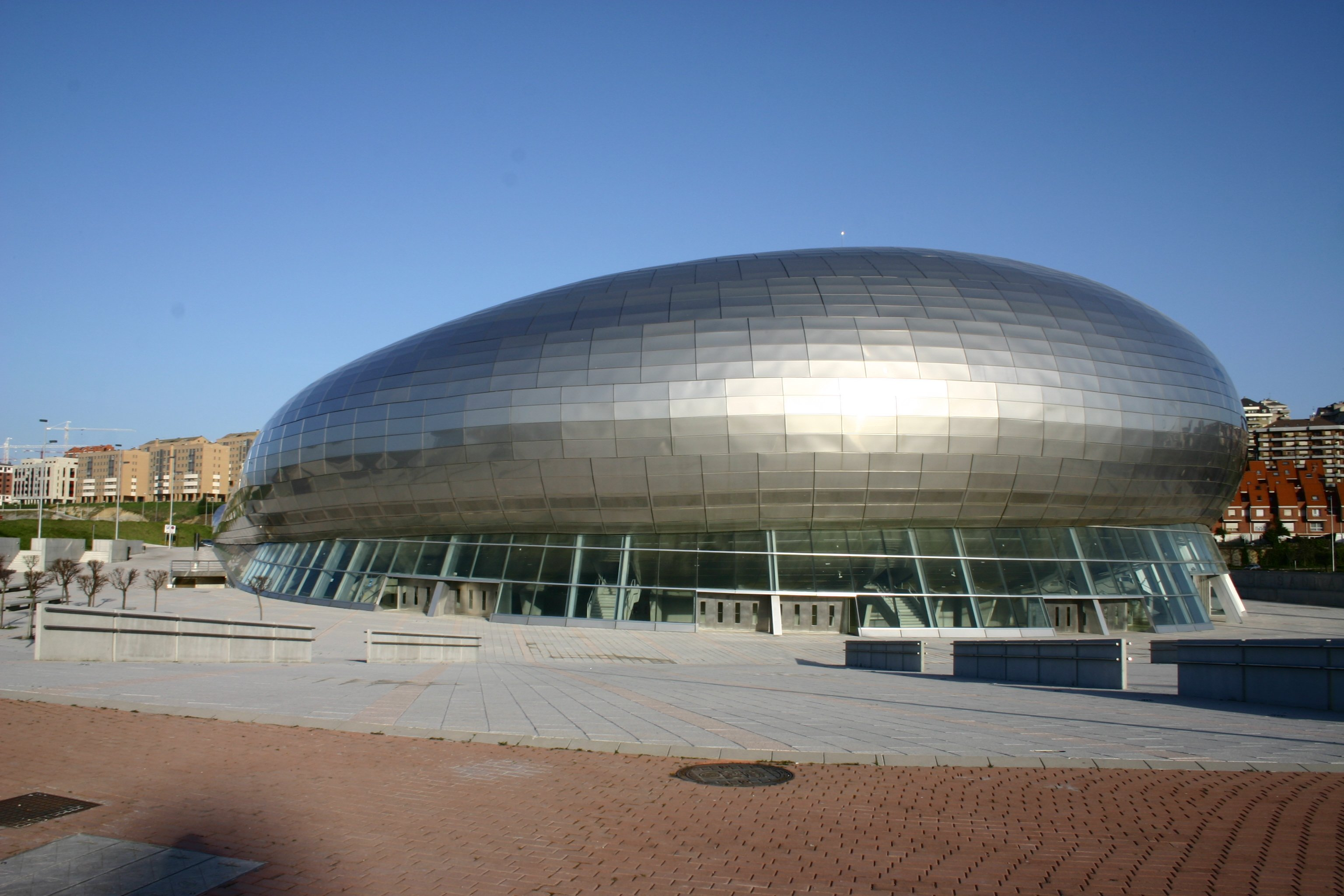
- Interactive map of Palacio de Deportes de Santander
- Full name: Palacio de Deportes de Santander
- Location: Santander, Spain
- Capacity: 6,000

Construction
- Opened: 2003

Tenants
- CD Estela (2003–present); Cantbasket 04 (2004–present)

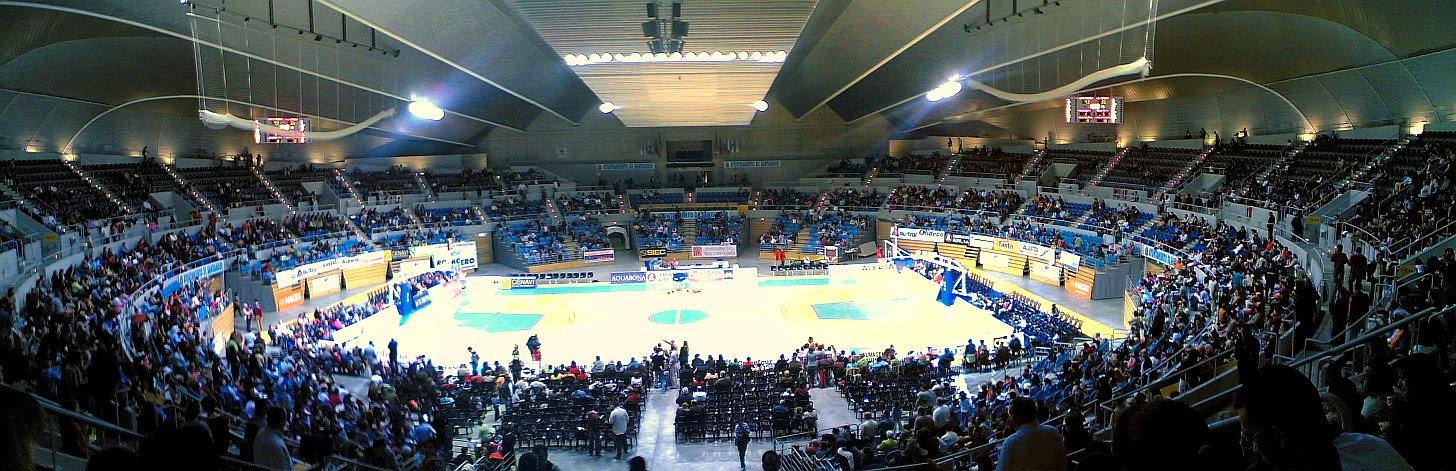
Panoramical view

Palacio de Deportes de Santander is an arena in Santander, Cantabria, Spain. It is primarily used for basketball and handball. The arena has 6,000 seats. It was opened in 2003 and designed by Julián Franco and José Manuel Palao.

== See also ==
- List of tennis stadiums by capacity
