= 2022 European Junior Badminton Championships – Girls' doubles =

2022 European Junior Badminton Championships – Girls doubles
Tournament details
- Dates: 22 – 27 August
- Competitors: 58 from 33 nations
- Venue: Athletic Hall Belgrade
- Location: Belgrade, Serbia

The girls doubles tournament of the 2022 European Junior Badminton Championships was held from 22 to 27 August. Anastasiia Boiarun and Alena Iakovleva from Russia clinched this title in the last edition.

== Seeds ==
Seeds were announced on 5 August.

1. (Ukraine) Polina Buhrova / Yana Sobko
2. (Spain) Nikol Carulla / Lucia Rodriguez
3. (France) Malya Hoareau / Camille Pognante
4. (Germany) Selin Hübsch / Julia Meyer

5. (England) Lisa Curtin / Estelle Van Leeuwen
6. (Switzerland) Lucie Amiguet / Vera Appenzeller
7. (Czech Republic) Lucie Krulová / Petra Maixnerová
8. (Netherlands) Kirsten De Wit / Meerte Loos (second round)

== Draw ==
=== Finals ===
Semi-finals
(Denmark) E I Braüner (Denmark) S Røjkjær	14	15
(England) L Curtin (England) E Van Leeuwen	21	21
(Switzerland) L Amiguet (Switzerland) V Appenzeller	21	15	13
(Spain) N Carulla (Spain) Lucia Rodriguez	19	21	21

Final
(England) L Curtin (England) E Van Leeuwen	19	16
(Spain) N Carulla (Spain) Lucia Rodriguez	21	21

=== Top half ===
==== Section 1 ====
First Round
(Finland) S Asfar (Finland) N Nyqvist	21	21
(Spain) M Izquierdo (Spain) C M Jimenez	13	16
(Belgium) A Boonen (Belgium) T van Wonterghem	21	19	17
(France) É Drouin (France) T Margueritte	19	21	21
(Slovenia) S Alič (Austria) L Rumpold	21	21
(Israel) Z Amoyal (Israel) A Zorabovich	15	10
(Denmark) E I Braüner (Denmark) S Røjkjær	21	21
(Sweden) E Öhling (Sweden) E Ryberg	17	11
(Portugal) M Fortunato (Portugal) B Roberto	21	21
(Hungary) K Kustan (Hungary) T Takacs	15	9
(Croatia) S Balenović (Croatia) A Pranić	17	16
(Romania) D-M Muscalu (Romania) A Stoica	21	21

Second Round
1	(Ukraine) P Buhrova (Ukraine) Y Sobko	19	21	21
(Finland) S Asfar (Finland) N Nyqvist	21	18	5
(France) É Drouin (France) T Margueritte	22	21
(Slovenia) S Alič (Austria) L Rumpold	20	13
8	(Netherlands) K De Wit (Netherlands) M Loos	12	10
(Denmark) E I Braüner (Denmark) S Røjkjær	21	21
(Portugal) M Fortunato (Portugal) B Roberto	19	12
(Romania) D-M Muscalu (Romania) A Stoica	21	21

Third Round
1	(Ukraine) P Buhrova (Ukraine) Y Sobko	21	14	13
(France) É Drouin (France) T Margueritte	18	21	21
(Denmark) E I Braüner (Denmark) S Røjkjær	21	21	21
(Romania) D-M Muscalu (Romania) A Stoica	23	17	7

Quarter-finals
(France) É Drouin (France) T Margueritte	16	14
(Denmark) E I Braüner (Denmark) S Røjkjær	21	21

==== Section 2 ====
First Round
(Greece) S Gialama (Greece) A Spyridopoulou	17	11
(Serbia) S Peric (Serbia) A Vitman	21	21
(Poland) A Czuchra (Poland) A Weslawowicz	21	21
(Slovakia) J Ivanovicova (Slovakia) N Slobodova	7	9
(Slovenia) N Bedič (Slovenia) K Matovič	25	15
(Republic of Ireland) L Comer (Republic of Ireland) S Noble	27	21
5	(England) L Curtin (England) E Van Leeuwen	21	21
(Czech Republic) K Koliášová (Czech Republic) K Osladilová	10	12
(Scotland) K Chan (Scotland) I McCallister	21	21
(Latvia) A Babre (Lithuania) J Keleciute	18	16
(Estonia) E Pärsim (Estonia) M Salu	17	21	21
(Switzerland) L Schadegg (Switzerland) L Zarrouk	21	14	16
(Norway) M Kragholm (Norway) S Pedersen	3	6
(Turkey) R Bodur (Turkey) C Erçetin	21	21

Second Round
4	(Germany) S Hübsch (Germany) J Meyer	22	21
(Serbia) S Peric (Serbia) A Vitman	20	13
(Poland) A Czuchra (Poland) A Weslawowicz	21	21
(Republic of Ireland) L Comer (Republic of Ireland) S Noble	5	7
5	(England) L Curtin (England) E Van Leeuwen	21	21
(Scotland) K Chan (Scotland) I McCallister	5	14
(Estonia) E Pärsim (Estonia) M Salu	9	9
(Turkey) R Bodur (Turkey) C Erçetin	21	21

Third Round
4	(Germany) S Hübsch (Germany) J Meyer	21	21
(Poland) A Czuchra (Poland) A Weslawowicz	11	16
5	(England) L Curtin (England) E Van Leeuwen	21	22
(Turkey) R Bodur (Turkey) C Erçetin	14	20

Quarter-finals
(Germany) S Hübsch (Germany) J Meyer	17	10
(England) L Curtin (England) E Van Leeuwen	21	21

=== Bottom half ===
==== Section 3 ====
First Round
(Bulgaria) M Chepisheva (Bulgaria) T Popivanova	21	21
(Greece) S K Pavlidou (Greece) T A Pavlidou	9	11
(Austria) L Krug (Austria) C Rudolf	18	21	21
(Netherlands) S Nijsse (Netherlands) F Wang	21	11	19
(Republic of Ireland) N Flynn (Republic of Ireland) S Flynn	18	21	10
(England) C Dennis (England) L Lee	21	17	21
(Sweden) A Magnusson (Sweden) S Strömvall	20	17
6	(Switzerland) L Amiguet (Switzerland) V Appenzeller	22	21
(Cyprus) I Antoniou (Cyprus) C Michael	10	13
(Poland) J Piwowar (Poland) J Stankiewicz	21	21
(Portugal) M Cabaco (Portugal) M Sousa	21	21
(Serbia) M Aleksic (Serbia) T Latas	14	16
(Germany) A Lehmann (Germany) A Mejikovskiy	21	21
(Estonia) K Ilves (Estonia) M E Teller	9	9

Second Round
(Bulgaria) M Chepisheva (Bulgaria) T Popivanova	21	21
(Austria) L Krug (Austria) C Rudolf	10	16
(England) C Dennis (England) L Lee	14	25	15
6	(Switzerland) L Amiguet (Switzerland) V Appenzeller	21	23	21
(Poland) J Piwowar (Poland) J Stankiewicz	21	21
(Portugal) M Cabaco (Portugal) M Sousa	7	16
(Germany) A Lehmann (Germany) A Mejikovskiy	15	21	14
3	(France) M Hoareau (France) C Pognante	21	12	21

Third Round
(Bulgaria) M Chepisheva (Bulgaria) T Popivanova	21	13	10
6	(Switzerland) L Amiguet (Switzerland) V Appenzeller	14	21	21
(Poland) J Piwowar (Poland) J Stankiewicz	15	20
3	(France) M Hoareau (France) C Pognante	21	22

Quarter-finals
(Switzerland) L Amiguet (Switzerland) V Appenzeller	22	10	21
(France) M Hoareau (France) C Pognante	20	21	19

==== Section 4 ====
First Round
(Ukraine) V Frolova (Ukraine) S Lavrova	21	21
(Latvia) A Kupca (Latvia) A Rulle-Titava	16	18
(Italy) A S De March (Italy) E Piccinin	10	10
(Denmark) B Sillassen (Denmark) M H Tommerup	21	21
(Romania) L Constantin (Romania) A Serban	15	22
(Bulgaria) K Nalbantova (Italy) G Stiglich	21	24
(Hungary) Z Szabo (Hungary) N Z Vetor	21	11	14
(Israel) A Bergelson (Israel) A Kirillova	13	21	21
(Portugal) P Saarnivaara (Portugal) O Tapola	21	10	16
(Slovakia) O Kadlecova (Slovakia) L Vybochova	21	21
(Scotland) S Ford (Scotland) B Stalker	11	18
(Lithuania) V Paulauskaite (Lithuania) M Sukackaite	21	21

Second Round
(Ukraine) V Frolova (Ukraine) S Lavrova	14	19
(Denmark) B Sillassen (Denmark) M H Tommerup	21	21
(Bulgaria) K Nalbantova (Italy) G Stiglich	16	19
7	(Czech Republic) L Krulová (Czech Republic) P Maixnerová	21	21
(Israel) A Bergelson (Israel) A Kirillova	24	21
(Slovakia) O Kadlecova (Slovakia) L Vybochova	22	14
(Lithuania) V Paulauskaite (Lithuania) M Sukackaite	21	16	14
2	(Spain) N Carulla (Spain) Lucia Rodriguez	19	21	21

Third Round
(Denmark) B Sillassen (Denmark) M H Tommerup	21	21
7	(Czech Republic) L Krulová (Czech Republic) P Maixnerová	17	15
(Israel) A Bergelson (Israel) A Kirillova	10	12
2	(Spain) N Carulla (Spain) Lucia Rodriguez	21	21

Quarter-finals
(Denmark) B Sillassen (Denmark) M H Tommerup	18	21	13
(Spain) N Carulla (Spain) Lucia Rodriguez	21	17	21
