= 2024 European Women's Team Badminton Championships qualification stage =

The following results are the 2024 European Women's Team Badminton Championships qualification stage.

== Summary ==
The qualification stage was held between 7 and 10 December 2023 in 6 cities across Europe.

Group	Host city	Qualifiers	Failed to qualify
1	(Spain) Madrid; Residencia Joaquín Blume	Spain	Sweden; Italy; Luxembourg
2	(Germany) Bad Camberg; Kreissporthalle	Germany	England
3	(France) Aire-sur-la-Lys; Complexe Sportif Régional	France	Switzerland; Belgium; Slovenia
4	(Azerbaijan) Khirdalan; Absheron Olympic Sports Complex	Scotland	Estonia; Azerbaijan; Slovakia
5	(Bulgaria) Sofia; Badminton hall "Europe"	Turkey	Bulgaria^{§} Ireland; Latvia
5	(Bulgaria) Sofia; Badminton hall "Europe"	Turkey	Ukraine; Greenland
6	(Netherlands) Arnhem; National Sports Centre Papendal	Netherlands	Portugal; Finland
6	(Netherlands) Arnhem; National Sports Centre Papendal	Netherlands	Hungary^{§} Czech Republic; Israel

§: Subgroup's winner.

== Group 1 ==
Pos	Team	Pld	W	L	MF	MA	MD	GF	GA	GD	PF	PA	PD	Pts	Qualification
1	Spain (Q)	3	3	0	14	1	+13	28	3	+25	630	371	+259	3	Advance to Final tournament
2	Sweden	3	2	1	9	6	+3	18	13	+5	557	475	+82	2	
3	Italy	3	1	2	6	9	−3	14	19	−5	542	586	−44	1	
4	Luxembourg	3	0	3	1	14	−13	3	28	−25	345	642	−297	0	

Source: BWF
(Q) Qualified to the phase indicated

=== Italy vs. Luxembourg ===
Italy
4
Residencia Joaquín Blume, Court 1
6 December 2023, 9:30 UTC+1

Luxembourg
1

			1	2	3
1	(Italy) (Luxembourg)	Judith Mair; Kim Schmidt	16; 21	18; 21
2	(Italy) (Luxembourg)	Gianna Stiglich; Zoé Sinico	21; 7	21; 10
3	(Italy) (Luxembourg)	Emma Piccinin; Myriam Have	21; 16	21; 8
4	(Italy) (Luxembourg)	Martina Corsini / Judith Mair; Tessy Aulner / Myriam Have	21; 12	21; 10
5	(Italy) (Luxembourg)	Emma Piccinin / Gianna Stiglich; Mara Hafner / Zoé Sinico	22; 20	19; 21	21; 16

=== Spain vs. Sweden ===
Spain
4
Residencia Joaquín Blume, Court 1
6 December 2023, 15:30 UTC+1

Sweden
1

			1	2	3
1	(Spain) (Sweden)	Carolina Marín; Cecilia Wang	21; 13	21; 18
2	(Spain) (Sweden)	Clara Azurmendi; Mirjam Lindgärde	21; 7	21; 14
3	(Spain) (Sweden)	Paula López / Lucia Rodríguez; Malena Norrman / Ronak Olyaee	21; 14	21; 10
4	(Spain) (Sweden)	Ania Setién; Elin Ryberg	21; 10	21; 18
5	(Spain) (Sweden)	Clara Azurmendi / Beatriz Corrales; Moa Sjöö / Tilda Sjöö	12; 21	17; 21

=== Italy vs. Sweden ===
Italy
2
Residencia Joaquín Blume, Court 1
7 December 2023, 9:30 UTC+1

Sweden
3

			1	2	3
1	(Italy) (Sweden)	Judith Mair; Cecilia Wang	21; 14	19; 21	18; 21
2	(Italy) (Sweden)	Gianna Stiglich; Mirjam Lindgärde	21; 17	21; 14
3	(Italy) (Sweden)	Emma Piccinin; Elin Ryberg	21; 19	21; 11
4	(Italy) (Sweden)	Martina Corsini / Gianna Stiglich; Malena Norrman / Jessica Silvennoinen	13; 21	11; 21
5	(Italy) (Sweden)	Judith Mair / Emma Piccinin; Moa Sjöö / Tilda Sjöö	16; 21	9; 21

=== Spain vs. Luxembourg ===
Spain
5
Residencia Joaquín Blume, Court 1
7 December 2023, 15:30 UTC+1

Luxembourg
0

			1	2	3
1	(Spain) (Luxembourg)	Carolina Marín; Mara Hafner	21; 7	21; 6
2	(Spain) (Luxembourg)	Ania Setién; Zoé Sinico	21; 10	21; 5
3	(Spain) (Luxembourg)	Nikol Carulla; Myriam Have	21; 13	21; 16
4	(Spain) (Luxembourg)	Clara Azurmendi / Beatriz Corrales; Tessy Aulner / Myriam Have	21; 11	21; 15
5	(Spain) (Luxembourg)	Nikol Carulla / Paula López; Mara Hafner / Zoé Sinico	21; 10	21; 3

=== Luxembourg vs. Sweden ===
Luxembourg
0
Residencia Joaquín Blume, Court 1
8 December 2023, 9:30 UTC+1

Sweden
5

			1	2	3
1	(Luxembourg) (Sweden)	Mara Hafner; Cecilia Wang	7; 21	7; 21
2	(Luxembourg) (Sweden)	Zoé Sinico; Mirjam Lindgärde	6; 21	6; 21
3	(Luxembourg) (Sweden)	Myriam Have; Khushi Harakamani	13; 21	16; 21
4	(Luxembourg) (Sweden)	Mara Hafner / Zoé Sinico; Malena Norrman / Jessica Silvennoinen	5; 21	6; 21
5	(Luxembourg) (Sweden)	Tessy Aulner / Myriam Have; Ronak Olyaee / Tilda Sjöö	12; 21	9; 21

=== Spain vs. Italy ===
Spain
5
Residencia Joaquín Blume, Court 1
8 December 2023, 15:30 UTC+1

Italy
0

			1	2	3
1	(Spain) (Italy)	Carolina Marín; Judith Mair	21; 8	21; 5
2	(Spain) (Italy)	Clara Azurmendi; Gianna Stiglich	21; 7	21; 11
3	(Spain) (Italy)	Ania Setién; Emma Piccinin	21; 9	21; 12
4	(Spain) (Italy)	Paula López / Lucia Rodríguez; Martina Corsini / Judith Mair	21; 14	21; 13
5	(Spain) (Italy)	Clara Azurmendi / Nikol Carulla; Emma Piccinin / Gianna Stiglich	21; 17	13; 21	21; 12

== Group 2 ==
Pos	Team	Pld	W	L	MF	MA	MD	GF	GA	GD	PF	PA	PD	Pts
1	Germany	1	1	0	4	1	+3	8	2	+6	208	140	+68	1
2	England	1	0	1	1	4	−3	2	8	−6	140	208	−68	0

Source: BWF

=== Germany vs. England ===
Germany
4
Kreissporthalle, Court 1
9 December 2023, 18:30 UTC+1

England
1

			1	2	3
1	(Germany) (England)	Yvonne Li; Freya Redfearn	21; 6	21; 8
2	(Germany) (England)	Linda Efler / Isabel Lohau; Lizzie Tolman / Estelle van Leeuwen	21; 15	21; 19
3	(Germany) (England)	Miranda Wilson; Lisa Curtin	20; 22	19; 21
4	(Germany) (England)	Stine Küspert / Emma Moszczynski; Abbygael Harris / Annie Lado	21; 9	22; 20
5	(Germany) (England)	Florentine Schöffski; Leona Lee	21; 7	21; 13

== Group 3 ==
Pos	Team	Pld	W	L	MF	MA	MD	GF	GA	GD	PF	PA	PD	Pts	Qualification
1	France (Q)	3	3	0	15	0	+15	30	2	+28	663	311	+352	3	Advance to Final tournament
2	Switzerland	3	2	1	7	8	−1	17	16	+1	540	564	−24	2	
3	Belgium	3	1	2	6	9	−3	13	21	−8	514	644	−130	1	
4	Slovenia	3	0	3	2	13	−11	5	26	−21	426	624	−198	0	

Source: BWF
(Q) Qualified to the phase indicated

=== France vs. Slovenia ===
France
5
Complexe Sportif Régional, Court 1
7 December 2023, 13:00 UTC+1

Slovenia
0

			1	2	3
1	(France) (Slovenia)	Léonice Huet; Petra Polanc	21; 15	21; 14
2	(France) (Slovenia)	Rosy Oktavia Pancasari; Kim Matovič	21; 10	21; 11
3	(France) (Slovenia)	Margot Lambert / Anne Tran; Zoja Novak / Petra Polanc	21; 12	21; 7
4	(France) (Slovenia)	Anna Tatranova; Anja Blazina	21; 14	21; 6
5	(France) (Slovenia)	Sharone Bauer / Emilie Vercelot; Anja Jordan / Kim Matovič	21; 12	21; 8

=== Switzerland vs. Belgium ===
Switzerland
3
Complexe Sportif Régional, Court 2
7 December 2023, 13:00 UTC+1

Belgium
2

			1	2	3
1	(Switzerland) (Belgium)	Jenjira Stadelmann; Clara Lassaux	16; 21	21; 7	22; 24
2	(Switzerland) (Belgium)	Lucie Amiguet / Leila Zarrouk; Amber Boonen / Tammi van Wonterghem	21; 12	21; 15
3	(Switzerland) (Belgium)	Milena Schnider; Karla Henry	21; 11	21; 11
4	(Switzerland) (Belgium)	Aline Müller / Jenjira Stadelmann; Lise Jaques / Lien Lammertyn	21; 19	22; 24	19; 21
5	(Switzerland) (Belgium)	Leila Zarrouk; Amber Boonen	21; 13	21; 13

=== France vs. Belgium ===
France
5
Complexe Sportif Régional, Court 1
8 December 2023, 17:00 UTC+1

Belgium
0

			1	2	3
1	(France) (Belgium)	Qi Xuefei; Clara Lassaux	21; 15	21; 6
2	(France) (Belgium)	Léonice Huet; Karla Henry	21; 8	21; 9
3	(France) (Belgium)	Rosy Oktavia Pancasari; Lien Lammertyn	18; 21	21; 2	21; 13
4	(France) (Belgium)	Sharone Bauer / Emilie Vercelot; Amber Boonen / Tammi van Wonterghem	21; 8	21; 13
5	(France) (Belgium)	Margot Lambert / Anne Tran; Lise Jaques / Lien Lammertyn	21; 7	21; 6

=== Switzerland vs. Slovenia ===
Switzerland
4
Complexe Sportif Régional, Court 2
8 December 2023, 17:00 UTC+1

Slovenia
1

			1	2	3
1	(Switzerland) (Slovenia)	Milena Schnider; Petra Polanc	21; 12	21; 18
2	(Switzerland) (Slovenia)	Leila Zarrouk; Anja Jordan	21; 10	21; 19
3	(Switzerland) (Slovenia)	Lucie Amiguet; Anja Blazina	17; 21	14; 21
4	(Switzerland) (Slovenia)	Lucie Amiguet / Leila Zarrouk; Kim Matovič / Zoja Novak	21; 13	21; 16
5	(Switzerland) (Slovenia)	Milena Schnider / Jenjira Stadelmann; Anja Blazina / Petra Polanc	21; 13	21; 5

=== France vs. Switzerland ===
France
5
Complexe Sportif Régional, Court 1
9 December 2023, 10:00 UTC+1

Switzerland
0

			1	2	3
1	(France) (Switzerland)	Qi Xuefei; Jenjira Stadelmann	15; 21	21; 10		retired
2	(France) (Switzerland)	Léonice Huet; Milena Schnider	21; 9	21; 5
3	(France) (Switzerland)	Rosy Oktavia Pancasari; Leila Zarrouk	21; 19	21; 15
4	(France) (Switzerland)	Sharone Bauer / Emilie Vercelot; Milena Schnider / Jenjira Stadelmann				w/o
5	(France) (Switzerland)	Margot Lambert / Anne Tran; Lucie Amiguet / Leila Zarrouk	21; 7	21; 8

=== Belgium vs. Slovenia ===
Belgium
4
Complexe Sportif Régional, Court 2
9 December 2023, 10:00 UTC+1

Slovenia
1

			1	2	3
1	(Belgium) (Slovenia)	Lianne Tan; Petra Polanc	21; 12	21; 17
2	(Belgium) (Slovenia)	Clara Lassaux; Anja Jordan	21; 14	21; 5
3	(Belgium) (Slovenia)	Karla Henry; Anja Blazina	13; 21	16; 21
4	(Belgium) (Slovenia)	Lien Lammertyn / Clara Lassaux; Zoja Novak / Petra Polanc	21; 13	18; 21	21; 14
5	(Belgium) (Slovenia)	Amber Boonen / Tammi van Wonterghem; Anja Jordan / Kim Matovič	21; 15	21; 16

== Group 4 ==
Pos	Team	Pld	W	L	MF	MA	MD	GF	GA	GD	PF	PA	PD	Pts	Qualification
1	Scotland (Q)	3	3	0	15	0	+15	30	1	+29	648	352	+296	3	Advance to Final tournament
2	Estonia	3	2	1	9	6	+3	19	13	+6	559	472	+87	2	
3	Azerbaijan	3	1	2	4	11	−7	9	22	−13	435	580	−145	1	
4	Slovakia	3	0	3	2	13	−11	5	27	−22	415	653	−238	0	

Source: BWF
(Q) Qualified to the phase indicated

=== Estonia vs. Slovakia ===
Estonia
5
Absheron Olympic Sports Complex, Court 1
7 December 2023, 10:00 UTC+1

Slovakia
0

			1	2	3
1	(Estonia) (Slovakia)	Kristin Kuuba; Katarína Vargová	21; 10	21; 8
2	(Estonia) (Slovakia)	Ramona Üprus; Natália Slobodová	21; 18	21; 18
3	(Estonia) (Slovakia)	Catlyn Kruus; Olívia Kadlecová	19; 21	21; 9	21; 15
4	(Estonia) (Slovakia)	Kati-Kreet Käsner / Helina Rüütel; Natália Slobodová / Katarína Vargová	21; 13	21; 7
5	(Estonia) (Slovakia)	Catlyn Kruus / Ramona Üprus; Johanka Ivanovičová / Olívia Kadlecová	21; 11	21; 12

=== Scotland vs. Azerbaijan ===
Scotland
5
Absheron Olympic Sports Complex, Court 1
7 December 2023, 14:00 UTC+1

Azerbaijan
0

			1	2	3
1	(Scotland) (Azerbaijan)	Kirsty Gilmour; Keisha Fatimah Azzahra	21; 18	21; 16
2	(Scotland) (Azerbaijan)	Rachel Sugden; Era Maftuha	21; 14	22; 20
3	(Scotland) (Azerbaijan)	Lauren Middleton; Hajar Nuriyeva	21; 10	21; 8
4	(Scotland) (Azerbaijan)	Julie MacPherson / Ciara Torrance; Keisha Fatimah Azzahra / Era Maftuha	21; 9	21; 11
5	(Scotland) (Azerbaijan)	Rachel Andrew / Rachel Sugden; Leyla Jamalzade / Hajar Nuriyeva	21; 5	21; 7

=== Scotland vs. Slovakia ===
Scotland
5
Absheron Olympic Sports Complex, Court 1
8 December 2023, 10:00 UTC+1

Slovakia
0

			1	2	3
1	(Scotland) (Slovakia)	Kirsty Gilmour; Natália Slobodová	21; 4	21; 8
2	(Scotland) (Slovakia)	Rachel Sugden; Olívia Kadlecová	21; 12	21; 8
3	(Scotland) (Slovakia)	Lauren Middleton; Johanka Ivanovičová	21; 10	21; 14
4	(Scotland) (Slovakia)	Julie MacPherson / Ciara Torrance; Natália Slobodová / Katarína Vargová	21; 6	21; 10
5	(Scotland) (Slovakia)	Rachel Andrew / Eleanor O'Donnell; Johanka Ivanovičová / Olívia Kadlecová	21; 11	21; 13

=== Estonia vs. Azerbaijan ===
Estonia
4
Absheron Olympic Sports Complex, Court 1
8 December 2023, 14:00 UTC+1

Azerbaijan
1

			1	2	3
1	(Estonia) (Azerbaijan)	Kristin Kuuba; Keisha Fatimah Azzahra	13; 21	11; 21
2	(Estonia) (Azerbaijan)	Ramona Üprus; Leyla Jamalzade	21; 4	21; 3
3	(Estonia) (Azerbaijan)	Catlyn Kruus; Hajar Nuriyeva	21; 6	21; 11
4	(Estonia) (Azerbaijan)	Kati-Kreet Käsner / Helina Rüütel; Keisha Fatimah Azzahra / Hajar Nuriyeva	21; 17	21; 10
5	(Estonia) (Azerbaijan)	Catlyn Kruus / Ramona Üprus; Leyla Jamalzade / Aysu Karimzade	21; 4	21; 6

=== Scotland vs. Estonia ===
Scotland
5
Absheron Olympic Sports Complex, Court 1
9 December 2023, 09:00 UTC+1

Estonia
0

			1	2	3
1	(Scotland) (Estonia)	Kirsty Gilmour; Kristin Kuuba	6; 2			retired
2	(Scotland) (Estonia)	Rachel Sugden; Ramona Üprus	21; 18	21; 15
3	(Scotland) (Estonia)	Lauren Middleton; Catlyn Kruus	21; 13	17; 21	21; 11
4	(Scotland) (Estonia)	Julie MacPherson / Ciara Torrance; Kati-Kreet Käsner / Helina Rüütel	21; 13	21; 12
5	(Scotland) (Estonia)	Rachel Andrew / Eleanor O'Donnell; Catlyn Kruus / Ramona Üprus	21; 19	21; 14

=== Slovakia vs. Azerbaijan ===
Slovakia
2
Absheron Olympic Sports Complex, Court 1
9 December 2023, 13:00 UTC+1

Azerbaijan
3

			1	2	3
1	(Slovakia) (Azerbaijan)	Katarína Vargová; Keisha Fatimah Azzahra	9; 21	14; 21
2	(Slovakia) (Azerbaijan)	Natália Slobodová; Era Maftuha	12; 21	10; 21
3	(Slovakia) (Azerbaijan)	Olívia Kadlecová; Hajar Nuriyeva	21; 13	21; 17
4	(Slovakia) (Azerbaijan)	Johanka Ivanovičová / Katarína Vargová; Keisha Fatimah Azzahra / Era Maftuha	9; 21	21; 23
5	(Slovakia) (Azerbaijan)	Olívia Kadlecová / Natália Slobodová; Leyla Jamalzade / Hajar Nuriyeva	21; 15	17; 21	22; 20

== Group 5 ==
=== Subgroup 5A ===
Pos	Team	Pld	W	L	MF	MA	MD	GF	GA	GD	PF	PA	PD	Pts	Qualification
1	Bulgaria (Q)	2	2	0	9	1	+8	19	3	+16	453	263	+190	2	Advance to decider
2	Ireland	2	1	1	5	5	0	11	11	0	378	404	−26	1	
3	Latvia	2	0	2	1	9	−8	3	19	−16	273	437	−164	0	

Source: BWF
(Q) Qualified to the phase indicated

==== Bulgaria vs. Ireland ====
Bulgaria
4
Europe Badminton Hall, Court 1
7 December 2023, 10:00 UTC+1

Ireland
1

			1	2	3
1	(Bulgaria) (Republic of Ireland)	Kaloyana Nalbantova; Rachael Darragh	21; 19	21; 10
2	(Bulgaria) (Republic of Ireland)	Hristomira Popovska; Sophia Noble	21; 10	19; 21	18; 21
3	(Bulgaria) (Republic of Ireland)	Gergana Pavlova; Siofra Flynn	21; 11	25; 23
4	(Bulgaria) (Republic of Ireland)	Mariya Mitsova / Kaloyana Nalbantova; Kate Frost / Sophia Noble	21; 13	21; 15
5	(Bulgaria) (Republic of Ireland)	Gabriela Stoeva / Stefani Stoeva; Siofra Flynn / Moya Ryan	21; 11	21; 10

==== Latvia vs. Ireland ====
Latvia
1
Europe Badminton Hall, Court 1
8 December 2023, 10:00 UTC+1

Ireland
4

			1	2	3
1	(Latvia) (Republic of Ireland)	Jekaterina Romanova; Rachael Darragh	13; 21	16; 21
2	(Latvia) (Republic of Ireland)	Anna Kupča; Sophia Noble	12; 21	13; 21
3	(Latvia) (Republic of Ireland)	Ieva Pope; Siofra Flynn	17; 21	16; 21
4	(Latvia) (Republic of Ireland)	Anna Kupča / Jekaterina Romanova; Siofra Flynn / Moya Ryan	15; 21	21; 11	21; 14
5	(Latvia) (Republic of Ireland)	Ieva Pope / Diāna Stognija; Kate Frost / Sophia Noble	14; 21	16; 21

==== Bulgaria vs. Latvia ====
Bulgaria
5
Europe Badminton Hall, Court 1
9 December 2023, 10:00 UTC+1

Latvia
0

			1	2	3
1	(Bulgaria) (Latvia)	Kaloyana Nalbantova; Jekaterina Romanova	21; 14	21; 9
2	(Bulgaria) (Latvia)	Hristomira Popovska; Ieva Pope	21; 15	13; 21	21; 5
3	(Bulgaria) (Latvia)	Tanya Ivanova; Diana Stognija	21; 17			retired
4	(Bulgaria) (Latvia)	Gabriela Stoeva / Stefani Stoeva; Anna Kupca / Jekaterina Romanova	21; 7	21; 11
5	(Bulgaria) (Latvia)	Mihaela Chepisheva / Tsvetina Popivanova; Ieva Pope / Diana Stognija				w/o

=== Subgroup 5B ===
Pos	Team	Pld	W	L	MF	MA	MD	GF	GA	GD	PF	PA	PD	Pts	Qualification
1	Turkey (Q)	2	2	0	10	0	+10	20	2	+18	451	246	+205	2	Advance to decider
2	Ukraine	2	1	1	5	5	0	12	10	+2	389	295	+94	1	
3	Greenland	2	0	2	0	10	−10	0	20	−20	121	420	−299	0	

Source: BWF
(Q) Qualified to the phase indicated

==== Ukraine vs. Turkey ====
Ukraine
0
Europe Badminton Hall, Court 1
7 December 2023, 14:00 UTC+1

Turkey
5

			1	2	3
1	(Ukraine) (Turkey)	Polina Buhrova; Neslihan Arın	15; 21	11; 21
2	(Ukraine) (Turkey)	Yevheniia Kantemyr; Özge Bayrak	17; 21	21; 17	12; 21
3	(Ukraine) (Turkey)	Mariia Stoliarenko; Betül Soner	21; 13	19; 21	15; 21
4	(Ukraine) (Turkey)	Polina Buhrova / Yevheniia Kantemyr; Yasemen Bektas / Zehra Erdem	7; 21	10; 21
5	(Ukraine) (Turkey)	Mariia Stoliarenko / Yelyzaveta Zharka; Bengisu Erçetin / Nazlıcan İnci	20; 22	11; 21

==== Greenland vs. Turkey ====
Greenland
0
Europe Badminton Hall, Court 1
8 December 2023, 14:00 UTC+1

Turkey
5

			1	2	3
1	(Greenland) (Turkey)	Sara Lindskov Jacobsen; Neslihan Arın	7; 21	9; 21
2	(Greenland) (Turkey)	Tina Amassen Rafaelsen; Özge Bayrak	6; 21	2; 21
3	(Greenland) (Turkey)	Emilie Sørensen; Betül Soner	5; 21	6; 21
4	(Greenland) (Turkey)	Cecilia Josenius / Tina Amassen Rafaelsen; Yasemen Bektas / Cansu Erçetin	11; 21	9; 21
5	(Greenland) (Turkey)	Sara Lindskov / Emilie Sørensen; Bengisu Erçetin / Nazlıcan İnci	6; 21	6; 21

==== Ukraine vs. Greenland ====
Ukraine
5
Europe Badminton Hall, Court 1
9 December 2023, 14:00 UTC+1

Greenland
0

			1	2	3
1	(Ukraine) (Greenland)	Yevheniia Kantemyr; Tina Amassen Rafaelsen	21; 11	21; 2
2	(Ukraine) (Greenland)	Sofiia Lavrova; Emilie Sørensen	21; 5	21; 4
3	(Ukraine) (Greenland)	Mariia Stoliarenko; Thrune Amassen Rafaelsen	21; 5	21; 7
4	(Ukraine) (Greenland)	Mariia Stoliarenko / Yelyzaveta Zharka; Cecilia Josenius / Tina Amassen Rafaelsen	21; 3	21; 6
5	(Ukraine) (Greenland)	Varvara Frolova / Sofiia Lavrova; Thrune Amassen Rafaelsen / Emilie Sørensen	21; 6	21; 5

=== Decider ===
==== Bulgaria vs. Turkey ====
Bulgaria
2
Europe Badminton Hall, Court 1
10 December 2023, 10:00 UTC+1

Turkey
3

			1	2	3
1	(Bulgaria) (Turkey)	Kaloyana Nalbantova; Neslihan Arın	18; 21	14; 21
2	(Bulgaria) (Turkey)	Stefani Stoeva; Özge Bayrak	21; 19	21; 16
3	(Bulgaria) (Turkey)	Mariya Mitsova; Betül Soner	19; 21	18; 21
4	(Bulgaria) (Turkey)	Gabriela Stoeva / Stefani Stoeva; Bengisu Erçetin / Nazlıcan İnci	16; 21	21; 11	21; 12
5	(Bulgaria) (Turkey)	Mariya Mitsova / Kaloyana Nalbantova; Yasemen Bektas / Zehra Erdem	18; 21	21; 14	19; 21

== Group 6 ==
=== Subgroup 1 ===
Pos	Team	Pld	W	L	MF	MA	MD	GF	GA	GD	PF	PA	PD	Pts	Qualification
1	Netherlands (Q)	2	2	0	9	1	+8	18	2	+16	398	275	+123	2	Advance to decider
2	Portugal	2	1	1	3	7	−4	7	16	−9	341	440	−99	1	
3	Finland	2	0	2	3	7	−4	8	15	−7	399	423	−24	0	

Source: BWF
(Q) Qualified to the phase indicated

==== Netherlands vs. Portugal ====
Netherlands
5
Sportcentrum Papendal, Court 2
7 December 2023, 15:30 UTC+1

Portugal
0

			1	2	3
1	(Netherlands) (Portugal)	Jaymie Laurens; Mariana Paiva	21; 6	21; 6
2	(Netherlands) (Portugal)	Novi Wieland; Madalena Fortunato	21; 9	21; 12
3	(Netherlands) (Portugal)	Nadia Choukri; Sonia Gonçalves	21; 10	21; 14
4	(Netherlands) (Portugal)	Kirsten de Wit / Kelly van Buiten; Mariana Afonso / Madalena Fortunato	21; 10	21; 12
5	(Netherlands) (Portugal)	Jaymie Laurens / Alyssa Tirtosentono; Adriana Gonçalves / Sonia Gonçalves	21; 15	21; 12

==== Finland vs. Portugal ====
Finland
2
Sportcentrum Papendal, Court 2
8 December 2023, 15:30 UTC+1

Portugal
3

			1	2	3
1	(Finland) (Portugal)	Nella Nyqvist; Mariana Paiva	21; 8	21; 16
2	(Finland) (Portugal)	Petra Saarnivaara; Madalena Fortunato	19; 21	21; 17	12; 21
3	(Finland) (Portugal)	Nella Siilasmaa; Sonia Gonçalves	16; 21	10; 21
4	(Finland) (Portugal)	Nella Nyqvist / Oona Tapola; Adriana Gonçalves / Sonia Gonçalves	21; 18	16; 21	21; 21
5	(Finland) (Portugal)	Petra Saarnivaara / Nella Siilasmaa; Mariana Afonso / Madalena Fortunato	21; 13	21; 21

==== Netherlands vs. Finland ====
Netherlands
4
Sportcentrum Papendal, Court 1
9 December 2023, 10:30 UTC+1

Finland
1

			1	2	3
1	(Netherlands) (Finland)	Diede Odijk; Nella Nyqvist	12; 21	7; 21
2	(Netherlands) (Finland)	Nadia Choukri; Petra Saarnivaara	21; 14	21; 19
3	(Netherlands) (Finland)	Flora Wang; Oona Tapola	21; 17	22; 20
4	(Netherlands) (Finland)	Meerte Loos / Kelly van Buiten; Petra Saarnivaara / Nella Siilasmaa	21; 12	21; 15
5	(Netherlands) (Finland)	Kirsten de Wit / Alyssa Tirtosentono; Nella Nyqvist / Oona Tapola	21; 18	21; 12

=== Subgroup 2 ===
Pos	Team	Pld	W	L	MF	MA	MD	GF	GA	GD	PF	PA	PD	Pts	Qualification
1	Hungary (Q)	2	2	0	6	4	+2	14	11	+3	482	458	+24	2	Advance to decider
2	Czech Republic	2	1	1	5	5	0	13	10	+3	440	424	+16	1	
3	Israel	2	0	2	4	6	−2	9	15	−6	421	461	−40	0	

Source: BWF
(Q) Qualified to the phase indicated

==== Hungary vs. Czech Republic ====
Hungary
3
Sportcentrum Papendal, Court 2
7 December 2023, 10:30 UTC+1

Czech Republic
2

			1	2	3
1	(Hungary) (Czech Republic)	Vivien Sándorházi; Tereza Švábíková	11; 21	22; 20	21; 18
2	(Hungary) (Czech Republic)	Ágnes Körösi; Lucie Krulová	21; 14	21; 18
3	(Hungary) (Czech Republic)	Daniella Gonda; Petra Maixnerová	13; 21	19; 21
4	(Hungary) (Czech Republic)	Vivien Sándorházi / Monika Szőke; Soňa Hořínková / Kateřina Zuzáková	21; 19	19; 21	21; 19
5	(Hungary) (Czech Republic)	Daniella Gonda / Ágnes Körösi; Tereza Švábíková / Tallulah van Coppenolle	19; 21	19; 21

==== Israel vs. Czech Republic ====
Israel
2
Sportcentrum Papendal, Court 2
8 December 2023, 10:30 UTC+1

Czech Republic
3

			1	2	3
1	(Israel) (Czech Republic)	Ksenia Polikarpova; Tereza Švábíková	17; 21	19; 21
2	(Israel) (Czech Republic)	Heli Neiman; Tallulah van Coppenolle	21; 17	20; 22	21; 13
3	(Israel) (Czech Republic)	Dana Danilenko; Petra Maixnerová	21; 15	21; 13
4	(Israel) (Czech Republic)	Heli Neiman / Ksenia Polikarpova; Tereza Švábíková / Kateřina Zuzáková	15; 21	17; 21
5	(Israel) (Czech Republic)	Zohar Amoyal / Alina Bergelson; Lucie Krulová / Petra Maixnerová	12; 21	13; 21

=== Hungary vs. Israel ===
Hungary
3
Sportcentrum Papendal, Court 2
9 December 2023, 10:30 UTC+1

Israel
2

			1	2	3
1	(Hungary) (Israel)	Vivien Sándorházi; Ksenia Polikarpova	21; 13	21; 15
2	(Hungary) (Israel)	Ágnes Körösi; Heli Neiman	21; 15	21; 15
3	(Hungary) (Israel)	Monika Szőke; Dana Danilenko	18; 21	21; 14	21; 13
4	(Hungary) (Israel)	Daniella Gonda / Ágnes Körösi; Alina Bergelson / Heli Neiman	11; 21	23; 21	18; 21
5	(Hungary) (Israel)	Vivien Sándorházi / Monika Szőke; Dana Danilenko / Ksenia Polikarpova	21; 12	18; 21	20; 22

=== Decider ===
==== Netherlands vs. Hungary ====
Netherlands
3
Sportcentrum Papendal, Court 1
10 December 2023, 10:00 UTC+1

Hungary
2

			1	2	3
1	(Netherlands) (Hungary)	Jaymie Laurens; Vivien Sándorházi	21; 18	21; 19
2	(Netherlands) (Hungary)	Nadia Choukri; Ágnes Körösi	21; 19	12; 21	11; 21
3	(Netherlands) (Hungary)	Flora Wang; Monika Szőke	10; 21	7; 21
4	(Netherlands) (Hungary)	Meerte Loos / Kelly van Buiten; Daniella Gonda / Ágnes Körösi	21; 18	23; 21
5	(Netherlands) (Hungary)	Kirsten de Wit / Alyssa Tirtosentono; Vivien Sándorházi / Monika Szőke	21; 14	21; 13
