= 2022 European Junior Badminton Championships – Girls' singles =

Tournament details
- Dates: 22–27 August 2022
- Competitors: 73 from 35 nations
- Venue: Athletic Hall Belgrade
- Location: Belgrade, Serbia

The girls' singles tournament of the 2022 European Junior Badminton Championships was held from 22 to 27 August 2022. Anastasiia Shapovalova from Russia clinched this title in the last edition. Kaloyana Nalbantova of Bulgary was the winner of this edition.

== Seeds ==
Seeds were announced on 5 August.

1. (Ukraine) Polina Buhrova
2. (Spain) Luis Rodríguez
3. (France) Émilie Drouin
4. (Switzerland) Lucie Amiguet
5. (England) Lisa Curtin
6. (Italy) Gianna Stiglich
7. (Czech Republic) Lucie Krulová
8. (Republic of Ireland) Sophie Noble

9. (Czech Republic) Petra Maixnerová
10. (Bulgaria) Kaloyana Nalbantova
11. (Bulgaria) Mihaela Chepisheva
12. (Germany) Antonia Schaller
13. (Denmark) Benedicte Sillassen
14. (Spain) Nikol Carulla
15. (Slovenia) Špela Alič
16. (Germany) Selin Hübsch

== Draw ==
=== Finals ===
Quarter-finals
10	(Bulgaria) K Nalbantova	21	23
(England) L Lee	10	21
4	(Switzerland) Lucie Amiguet	17	7
(Finland) N Nyqvist	21	21
5	(England) L Curtin	21	21
3	(France) É Drouin	15	13
13	(Denmark) B Sillassen	16	21	21
9	(Czech Republic) P Maixnerová	21	14	12

Semi-finals
10	(Bulgaria) K Nalbantova	21	21
(Finland) N Nyqvist	16	19
5	(England) L Curtin	22	19	21
13	(Denmark) B Sillassen	20	21	19

Final
10	(Bulgaria) K Nalbantova	14	21	21
5	(England) L Curtin	21	17	16

=== Top half ===
==== Section 1 ====
First round
(Hungary) Z Szabó	19	22	21
(Sweden) K Harakamani	21	20	16

Second round
1	(Ukraine) P Buhrova	21	21
(Estonia) E Pärsim	9	10
(France) M Hoareau	9	14
(Denmark) F Østergaard	21	21
10	(Bulgaria) K Nalbantova	21	21
(Israel) A Bergelson	6	7
(Netherlands) F Wang	15	21	21
(Hungary) Z Szabó	21	19	19

Third round
1	(Ukraine) P Buhrova	18	14
(Denmark) F Østergaard	21	21
10	(Bulgaria) K Nalbantova	21	21
(Netherlands) F Wang	5	9

Fourth round
(Denmark) F Østergaard	11	20
10	(Bulgaria) K Nalbantova	21	22

==== Section 2 ====
First round
(Scotland) A Brooks	21	16	21
(Austria) C Rudolf	15	21	5

Second round
6	(Italy) G Stiglich	21	21
(Portugal) B Roberto	15	11
(Belgium) A Boonen	13	5
(England) L Lee	21	21
14	(Spain) N Carulla	21	21
(Estonia) E Berik	14	19
(Republic of Ireland) S Flynn
(Scotland) A Brooks	w	/	o

Third round
6	(Italy) G Stiglich	15	11
(England) L Lee	21	21
14	(Spain) N Carulla	18	21	21
(Scotland) A Brooks	21	12	19

Fourth round
(England) L Lee	21	21
14	(Spain) N Carulla	17	13

==== Section 3 ====
First round
(Greece) T A Pavlidou	10	15
(Denmark) S Karmann	21	21

Second round
4	(Switzerland) L Amiguet	21	21
(Slovakia) J Ivanovičová	16	6
(Norway) K Ødegårdstuen	13	21	21
(Croatia) A Pranić	21	17	15
12	(Germany) A Schaller	21	18	21
(Serbia) N Bogdanovic	5	21	12
(Turkey) B Sabancı	19	21	14
(Denmark) S Karmann	21	18	21

Third round
4	(Switzerland) L Amiguet	21	21
(Norway) K Ødegårdstuen	16	6
12	(Germany) A Schaller	21	15	21
(Denmark) S Karmann	15	21	16

Fourth round
4	(Switzerland) L Amiguet	23	21
12	(Germany) A Schaller	21	10

==== Section 4 ====
First round
(Latvia) A Babre	10	12
(Lithuania) V Paulauskaitė	21	21
(Finland) N Nyqvist	21	21
(Serbia) T Latas	7	4

Second round
7	(Czech Republic) L Krulová	17	21	21
(Romania) A Stoica	21	13	13
(Spain) C Teruel	18	21	21
(Lithuania) V Paulauskaitė	21	13	17
15	(Slovenia) Š Alič	22	21
(Poland) M Janko	20	17
(Wales) S Morris	5	12
(Finland) N Nyqvist	21	21

Third round
7	(Czech Republic) L Krulová	21	21
(Spain) C Teruel	10	2
15	(Slovenia) Š Alič	7	8
(Finland) N Nyqvist	21	21

Fourth round
7	(Czech Republic) L Krulová	10	11
(Finland) N Nyqvist	21	21

=== Bottom half ===
==== Section 5 ====
First round
(Romania) A Serban	21	21
(Portugal) M Fortunato	18	19
(Finland) S A Brahmakal	19	12
(Italy) E Piccinin	21	21

Second round
(Romania) A Serban	21	21
(Netherlands) S Nijsse	14	14
(Switzerland) V Appenzeller	21	13	21
16	(Germany) S Hübsch	18	21	19
(Italy) E Piccinin	17	21	21
(Slovenia) K Matovič	21	12	13
(Israel) A Kirillova	14	21	19
5	(England) L Curtin	21	16	21

Third round
(Romania) A Serban	20	19
(Switzerland) V Appenzeller	22	21
(Italy) E Piccinin	14	15
5	(England) L Curtin	21	21

Fourth round
(Switzerland) V Appenzeller	16	7
5	(England) L Curtin	21	21

==== Section 6 ====
First round
(Estonia) M Salu	25	21
(Scotland) S Ford	23	18

Second round
(Estonia) M Salu	13	25	18
(Germany) E Neve	21	23	21
(Greece) P Zlatintsi	8	8
11	(Bulgaria) M Chepisheva	21	21
(Armenia) E Tiraturyan	9	8
(Latvia) A Kupča	21	21
(Hungary) T Takács	22	16
3	(France) É Drouin	24	21

Third round
(Germany) E Neve	19	12
11	(Bulgaria) M Chepisheva	21	21
(Latvia) A Kupča	11	10
3	(France) É Drouin	21	21

Fourth round
11	(Bulgaria) M Chepisheva	19	19
3	(France) É Drouin	21	21

==== Section 7 ====
First round
(Poland) A Weslawowicz	21	21
(Norway) K Ellingsen	13	13

Second round
(Poland) A Weslawowicz	15	21	9
(Belgium) K Henry	21	17	21
(Lithuania) M Sukackaite	9	10
13	(Denmark) B Sillassen	21	21
(Sweden) E Öhling	19	17
(Serbia) S Perić	21	21
(Turkey) R Bodur	18	11
8	(Republic of Ireland) S Noble	21	21

Third round
(Belgium) K Henry	10	15
13	(Denmark) B Sillassen	21	21
(Serbia) S Perić	8	11
8	(Republic of Ireland) S Noble	21	21

Fourth round
13	(Denmark) B Sillassen	21	21
8	(Republic of Ireland) S Noble	14	12

==== Section 8 ====
First round
(Sweden) E Ryberg	w	/	o
(Croatia) J Buchberger

Second round
(Sweden) E Ryberg	21	21
(Slovakia) L Výbochová	18	11
(Croatia) S Balenović	8	6
9	(Czech Republic) P Maixnerová	21	21
(Austria) A Rumpold	12	14
(Ukraine) S Lavrova	21	21
(Cyprus) C Michael	11	13
2	(Spain) L Rodríguez	21	21

Third round
(Sweden) E Ryberg	11	22	15
9	(Czech Republic) P Maixnerová	21	20	21
(Ukraine) S Lavrova	21	21
2	(Spain) L Rodríguez	18	14

Fourth round
9	(Czech Republic) P Maixnerová	22	11
(Ukraine) S Lavrova	20	9^{r}
