= 2020 European Junior Badminton Championships – Girls' singles =

Tournament details
- Dates: 2–7 November
- Venue: Pajulahti Sports Institute
- Location: Lahti, Finland

The girls' singles tournament of the 2020 European Junior Badminton Championships was held from 2 to 7 November. Line Christophersen from Denmark clinched this title in the last edition.

== Seeds ==
Seeds were announced on 16 October.

1. (Russia) Anastasiia Shapovalova (champions)
2. (Netherlands) Amy Tan (quarterfinals)
3. (Spain) Ania Setien (second round)
4. (Serbia) Marija Sudimac (semifinals)
5. (Italy) Katharina Fink (second round)
6. (Russia) Mariia Golubeva (quarterfinals)
7. (Italy) Yasmine Hamza (second round)
8. (Spain) Lucia Rodriguez (quarterfinals)

== Draw ==
=== Finals ===
Semifinals
1	(Russia) Anastasiia Shapovalova	21	21
4	(Serbia) Marija Sudimac	6	13
(Sweden) Edith Urell	21	21
(Finland) Nella Nyqvist	15	12

Final
1	(Russia) Anastasiia Shapovalova	14	21	22
(Sweden) Edith Urell	21	18	20

=== Top half ===
==== Section 1 ====
First round
(Sweden) J Tuvesson	18	15
(Israel) H Neiman	21	21
(Denmark) B Sillassen	24	24
(Estonia) C Kruus	22	22
(Austria) E Wu	14	17
(Ukraine) P Buhrova	21	21

Second round
1	(Russia) A Shapovalova	21	21
(Czech Republic) T S Van Coppenolle	14	10
(France) A Tatranova	21	21
(Israel) H Neiman	17	18
5	(Italy) K Fink	14	13
(Denmark) B Sillassen	21	21
(Finland) J Salonen	13	14
(Ukraine) P Buhrova	21	21

Third round
1	(Russia) A Shapovalova	21	22
(France) A Tatranova	11	20
(Denmark) B Sillassen	21	15	21
(Ukraine) P Buhrova	18	21	19

Quarterfinals
1	(Russia) A Shapovalova	21	21
(Denmark) B Sillassen	17	10

==== Section 2 ====
First round
(Germany) A Schaller	10	8
(Denmark) S Pilgaard	21	21
(Luxembourg) K Schmidt	21	15	21
(Croatia) B Janičić	16	21	12
(Portugal) M Afonso	w	/	o
(Bulgaria) K Nalbantova

Second round
4	(Serbia) M Sudimac	21	22
(Switzerland) L Amiguet	18	20
(Slovenia) L Pipan	12	10
(Denmark) S Pilgaard	21	21
8	(Spain) L Rodriguez	21	21
(Luxembourg) K Schmidt	16	11
(Germany) M Bittner	21	21
(Portugal) M Afonso	8	12

Third round
4	(Serbia) M Sudimac	21	21
(Denmark) S Pilgaard	15	19
8	(Spain) L Rodriguez	21	21
(Germany) M Bittner	11	19

Quarterfinals
4	(Serbia) M Sudimac	21	16	21
8	(Spain) L Rodriguez	19	21	18

=== Bottom half ===
==== Section 3 ====
First round
(Czech Republic) K Mikelová	21	21
(Finland) N Nokkala	11	13
(Germany) F Schöffski	12	11
(Czech Republic) K Zuzáková	21	21
(Sweden) E Urell	21	21
(Slovenia) A Jordan	8	16
(Ukraine) M Stoliarenko	21	21
(Portugal) A Fernandes	11	11

Second round
(Czech Republic) K Mikelová	21	21
(France) F Nurit	5	7
(Czech Republic) K Zuzáková	11	12
6	(Russia) M Golubeva	21	21
(Sweden) E Urell	21	21
(Austria) J Höfle	5	6
(Ukraine) M Stoliarenko	21	21
3	(Spain) A Setien	15	13

Third round
(Czech Republic) K Mikelová	13	21	14
6	(Russia) M Golubeva	21	18	21
(Sweden) E Urell	21	21
(Ukraine) M Stoliarenko	19	10

Quarterfinals
6	(Russia) M Golubeva	9	11
(Sweden) E Urell	21	21

==== Section 4 ====
First round
(Denmark) A S Ryberg	11	18
(Russia) V Kuznetcova	21	21
(France) E Drouin	8	10
(Finland) N Nyqvist	21	21
(Estonia) R Üprus	21	14	16
(Switzerland) J Franconville	15	21	21

Second round
(Russia) V Kuznetcova	15	21
(Serbia) S Loncar	21	23
(Finland) N Nyqvist	23	21
7	(Italy) Y Hamza	21	17
(Switzerland) J Franconville	21	21
(Scotland) A Campbell	6	7
(Bulgaria) G Pavlova
2	(Netherlands) A Tan	w	/	o

Third round
(Serbia) S Loncar	17	18
(Finland) N Nyqvist	21	21
(Switzerland) J Franconville	10	21	18
2	(Netherlands) A Tan	21	17	21

Quarterfinals
(Finland) N Nyqvist	21	17	21
2	(Netherlands) A Tan	15	21	12
