= Nella Nyqvist =

Finnish badminton player (born 2006)

Personal information
- Born: 20 March 2006 (age 20) Mellunmäki, Finland
- Height: 1.72 m (5 ft 8 in)

Sport
- Country: Finland
- Sport: Badminton
- Handedness: Left
- Coached by: Ville Lång

Women's singles
- Highest ranking: 156 (3 November 2026)
- Current ranking: 156 (3 November 2026)
- BWF profile
Medal record
Women's badminton
Representing Finland
European Junior Championships
Bronze medal – third place	2020 Lahti	Girls' singles
Bronze medal – third place	2022 Belgrade	Girls' singles

Nella Nyqvist (born 20 March 2006) is a Finnish badminton player from Helsingfors club.

== Early life and career ==
Nyqvist, aged 6, was inspired by her parents to pick badminton. Her background is strong, mother Saara Hynninen and father Ilkka Nyqvist both played competitively at the national level. Her younger brother Niilo, too is a competitive player. She had her primary education from Myllypuro. She is coached by her parents and Ville Lång, a former men's singles player from her country.

She has won national championships in both singles and doubles disciplines. Her first title came when she was still a teenager in 2021 and has since won a total 4 titles in singles and 3 titles in women's doubles with Jenny Vähäsarja. Internationally, she won Latvian International Series in 2024 and Estonian International Series in 2025.

== Achievements ==
=== European Junior Championships ===
Girls' singles

Year	Venue	Opponent	Score	Result	Ref
2020	Pajulahti Sports Institute, Lahti, Finland	(Sweden) Edith Urell	15–21, 12–21	Bronze	
2022	Athletic Hall Belgrade, Belgrade, Serbia	(Bulgaria) Kaloyana Nalbantova	16–21, 19–21	Bronze	

=== BWF International Challenge/Series (2 titles, 4 runners-up) ===
Women's singles

Year	Tournament	Opponent	Score	Result
2024	Finnish International	(France) Anna Tatranova	21–16, 21–23, 11–21	(silver) Runner-up
2024	Latvia International	(Republic of Ireland) Sophia Noble	21–8, 21–14	(gold) Winner
2025	Estonian International	(Denmark) Anna Siess Ryberg	21–16, 21–13	(gold) Winner
2025	Latvia International	(Chinese Taipei) Wang Yu-si	19–21, 17–21	(silver) Runner-up
2026	Hungarian Future Series	(Bulgaria) Hristomira Popovska	19–21, 17–21	(silver) Runner-up
2026	Hungarian International	(Switzerland) Milena Schnider	Walkover	(silver) Runner-up

BWF International Challenge tournament
BWF International Series tournament
BWF Future Series tournament
