= Kaloyana Nalbantova =

Bulgarian badminton player (born 2006)

Personal information
- Born: 6 March 2006 (age 20) Parvomay, Bulgaria
- Height: 1.76 m (5 ft 9 in)

Sport
- Country: Bulgaria
- Sport: Badminton
- Handedness: Right

Women's singles
- Highest ranking: 35 (8 September 2026)
- Current ranking: 36 (10 November 2026)
- BWF profile
Medal record
Women's badminton
Representing Bulgaria
European Women's Team Championships
Gold medal – first place	2026 Istanbul	Women's team
European Junior Championships
Gold medal – first place	2022 Belgrade	Girls' singles
Gold medal – first place	2024 Ibiza	Girls' singles

Kaloyana Nalbantova (Bulgarian: Калояна Налбантова; born 6 March 2006) is a Bulgarian badminton player. She won the women's singles title at the 2022 European Junior Badminton Championships in Belgrade. She also represented Bulgaria in women's singles at the 2024 Summer Olympics.

== Career ==
In 2022, Kaloyana participated in the 2022 European Junior Badminton Championships and beat Lisa Curtin in the women's singles final 14–21, 21–17, 21–16 to win gold. She then won the Hungarian International by defeating Frederikke Lund in the final. In 2023, Kaloyana reached the final of the Dutch International but lost to Huang Yu-hsun. She also won her second international title by defeating Milena Schnider at the Bulgarian International.

In 2024, Kaloyana qualified for the women's singles event at the 2024 Summer Olympics. Placed into Group A with number 1 seed An Se-young and host representative Qi Xuefei, she first lost to An Se-young 15–21, 11–21. In her second match, she defeated Qi Xuefei 21–18, 21–18 but did not advance to the knockout stage.

== Achievements ==
=== European Junior Championships ===
Girls' singles

Year	Venue	Opponent	Score	Result	Ref
2022	Athletic Hall Belgrade, Belgrade, Serbia	(England) Lisa Curtin	14–21, 21–17, 21–16	Gold	
2024	Poliesportiu Sa Blanca Dona, Ibiza, Spain	(Turkey) Ravza Bodur	21–16, 21–9	Gold	

=== BWF World Tour (1 runner-up) ===
The BWF World Tour, which was announced on 19 March 2017 and implemented in 2018, is a series of elite badminton tournaments sanctioned by the Badminton World Federation (BWF). The BWF World Tour is divided into levels of World Tour Finals, Super 1000, Super 750, Super 500, Super 300 (part of the HSBC World Tour), and the BWF Tour Super 100.

Women's singles

Year	Tournament	Level	Opponent	Score	Result
2026	U.S. Open	Super 300	(Denmark) Line Christophersen	16–21, 21–16, 11–21	(silver) Runner-up

=== BWF International Challenge/Series (4 titles, 2 runners-up) ===
Women's singles

Year	Tournament	Opponent	Score	Result
2022	Hungarian International	(Denmark) Frederikke Lund	16–21, 21–13, 21–19	(gold) Winner
2023	Dutch International	(Chinese Taipei) Huang Yu-hsun	10–21, 11–21	(silver) Runner-up
2023	Future Series Nouvelle-Aquitaine	(Chinese Taipei) Tung Ciou-tong	17–21, 21–17, 11–21	(silver) Runner-up
2023	Bulgarian International	(Switzerland) Milena Schnider	21–12, 15–21, 21–15	(gold) Winner
2025	Belgian International	(Chinese Taipei) Peng Yu-wei	21–8, 13–21, 21–12	(gold) Winner
2025	Czech Open	(Denmark) Amalie Schulz	21–14, 12–21, 21–16	(gold) Winner

BWF International Challenge tournament
BWF International Series tournament
BWF Future Series tournament
