= 2026 European Junior Badminton Championships – Teams event =

2026 European Junior Badminton Championships – Mixed team
- Venue: Tatabányai Multifunkcionális Csarnok
- Location: Tatabánya, Hungary
- Dates: 18 August 2026 – 22 August 2026
- Nations: 30

Medalists
gold medal	France
silver medal	Denmark
bronze medal	Germany
bronze medal	Turkey

The mixed team tournament of the 2026 European Junior Badminton Championships was held from 18 to 22 August 2026.

== Tournament ==
=== Venue ===
This tournament was held at Tatabányai Multifunkcionális Csarnok in Tatabánya, Hungary.

=== Seeds ===
1. France
2. Denmark
3. Ukraine
4. Poland
5. Czech Republic
6. Turkey
7. Germany
8. Spain

=== Draw ===
The draw was announced on 4 August 2026.

Group A1	Group A2	Group B1	Group B2
France; Scotland; Slovakia	Bulgaria; Finland; Poland; Portugal	Czech Republic; Ireland; Estonia; Austria	Germany; Luxembourg; Lithuania; Sweden
Group C1	Group C2	Group D1	Group D2
Turkey; Italy; Ukraine; Croatia	England; Romania; Belgium; Norway	Slovenia; Latvia; Denmark	Spain; Hungary; Switzerland; Iceland

== Group stage ==
=== Group A1 ===
Pos	Team	Pld	W	L	MF	MA	MD	GF	GA	GD	PF	PA	PD	Pts	Qualification	France	Slovakia	Scotland
1	France	2	2	0	4	0	+4	18	2	+16	220	140	+80	2	Advance to knockout stage	—	2–0	2–0
2	Slovakia	2	1	1	2	2	0	11	9	+2	189	195	−6	1			—	2–0
3	Scotland	2	0	2	0	4	−4	1	19	−18	146	220	−74	0				—

Source: BWF

==== Scotland vs France ====
Scotland
0
Tatabányai Multifunkcionális Csarnok, Court 5
18 August 2026, 09:00 UTC+2

France
2

		Result
		(Scotland) 0–1 (France)
1	Jaagruti Mannem	3 – 11 (3–11)	Leana Laurent
2	Alfie Martin; Lewis Smith	14 – 22 (11–11)	Rayan Benaissa; Mady Sow
3	Deepti Vijayakumar; Qing Yang Xiao	19 – 33 (5–11)	Lily Gautier; Manon Heitzmann
4	Arnav Saraswat	26 – 44 (7–11)	Arthur Tatranov
5	Lewis Smith; Deepti Vijayakumar	32 – 55 (6–11)	Timeo Bourgin; Marjolene Raffin
		(Scotland) 0–2 (France)
6	Pranavi Singh	2 – 11 (2–11)	Leana Laurent
7	Alfie Martin; Lewis Smith	8 – 22 (6–11)	Rayan Benaissa; Mady Sow
8	Deepti Vijayakumar; Qing Yang Xiao	15 – 33 (7–11)	Eva Bouville; Marjolene Raffin
9	Arnav Saraswat	20 – 44 (5–11)	Arthur Tatranov
10	Alfie Martin; Deepti Vijayakumar	29 – 55 (9–11)	Rayan Benaissa; Manon Heitzmann
Tie won by France
11	Jaagruti Mannem	– Not played	Leana Laurent
12	Alfie Martin; Lewis Smith	– Not played	Rayan Benaissa; Mady Sow
13	Deepti Vijayakumar; Qing Yang Xiao	– Not played	Lily Gautier; Manon Heitzmann
14	Arnav Saraswat	– Not played	Arthur Tatranov
15	Lewis Smith; Deepti Vijayakumar	– Not played	Timeo Bourgin; Marjolene Raffin

==== Slovakia vs Scotland ====
Slovakia
2
Tatabányai Multifunkcionális Csarnok, Court 5
19 August 2026, 12:00 UTC+2

Scotland
0

		Result
		(Slovakia) 1–0 (Scotland)
1	Andrej Macek; Andrej Suchý	5 – 11 (5–11)	Alfie Martin; Lewis Smith
2	Andrej Suchý	22 – 17 (17–6)	Arnav Saraswat
3	Ella Eliášková; Charlotta Halova	33 – 30 (11–13)	Deepti Vijayakumar; Qing Yang Xiao
4	Andrej Suchý; Ella Eliášková	44 – 35 (11–5)	Alfie Martin; Qing Yang Xiao
5	Laura Fodorová	55 – 37 (11–2)	Pranavi Singh
		(Slovakia) 2–0 (Scotland)
6	Andrej Macek; Andrej Suchý	11 – 10 (11–10)	Arnav Saraswat; Lewis Smith
7	Andrej Suchý	22 – 18 (11–8)	Lewis Smith
8	Ella Eliášková; Charlotta Halova	33 – 23 (11–5)	Deepti Vijayakumar; Qing Yang Xiao
9	Andrej Suchý; Ella Eliášková	44 – 34 (11–11)	Alfie Martin; Deepti Vijayakumar
10	Laura Fodorová	55 – 48 (11–14)	Jaagruti Mannem
Tie won by Slovakia
11	Andrej Macek; Andrej Suchý	– Not played	Alfie Martin; Lewis Smith
12	Andrej Suchý	– Not played	Arnav Saraswat
13	Ella Eliášková; Charlotta Halova	– Not played	Deepti Vijayakumar; Qing Yang Xiao
14	Andrej Suchý; Ella Eliášková	– Not played	Lewis Smith; Deepti Vijayakumar
15	Laura Fodorová	– Not played	Jaagruti Mannem

==== Slovakia vs France ====
Slovakia
0
Tatabányai Multifunkcionális Csarnok, Court 1
20 August 2026, 09:00 UTC+2

France
2

		Result
		(Slovakia) 0–1 (France)
1	Ella Eliášková	11 – 8 (11–8)	Leana Laurent
2	Andrej Macek; Viktor Pavlovic	18 – 22 (7–14)	Timeo Bourgin; Orphé Queton-Bouissou
3	Ela Bieleschova; Vanessa Osadska	24 – 33 (6–11)	Eva Bouville; Marjolene Raffin
4	Samuel Fodor	30 – 44 (6–11)	Mady Sow
5	David Antonio Kozinka; Charlotta Halova	40 – 55 (10–11)	Rayan Benaissa; Melia Beule
		(Slovakia) 0–2 (France)
6	Laura Fodorová	11 – 9 (11–9)	Leana Laurent
7	Andrej Macek; Andrej Suchý	17 – 22 (6–13)	Timeo Bourgin; Orphé Queton-Bouissou
8	Ella Eliášková; Charlotta Halova	23 – 33 (6–11)	Melia Beule; Lily Gautier
9	Andrej Suchý	32 – 44 (9–11)	Arthur Tatranov
10	Andrej Suchý; Ella Eliášková	39 – 55 (7–11)	Timeo Bourgin; Marjolene Raffin
Tie won by France
11	Laura Fodorová	– Not played	Leana Laurent
12	Andrej Macek; Andrej Suchý	– Not played	Timeo Bourgin; Orphé Queton-Bouissou
13	Ella Eliášková; Charlotta Halova	– Not played	Eva Bouville; Marjolene Raffin
14	Andrej Suchý	– Not played	Mady Sow
15	Andrej Suchý; Ella Eliášková	– Not played	Timeo Bourgin; Marjolene Raffin

=== Group A2 ===
Pos	Team	Pld	W	L	MF	MA	MD	GF	GA	GD	PF	PA	PD	Pts	Qualification	Bulgaria	Poland	Portugal	Finland
1	Bulgaria	3	3	0	6	1	+5	13	4	+9	375	316	+59	3	Advance to knockout stage	—	2–1	2–0	2–0
2	Poland	3	2	1	5	2	+3	10	3	+7	374	292	+82	2			—	2–0	2–0
3	Portugal	3	1	2	2	5	−3	5	12	−7	328	352	−24	1				—	2–1
4	Finland	3	0	3	1	6	−5	6	15	−9	265	382	−117	0					—

Source: BWF

==== Bulgaria vs Portugal ====
Bulgaria
2
Tatabányai Multifunkcionális Csarnok, Court 1
18 August 2026, 15:00 UTC+2

Portugal
0

		Result
		(Bulgaria) 1–0 (Portugal)
1	Teodor Mitev	11 – 9 (11–9)	Tiago Berenguer
2	Teodor Mitev; Georgi Ruptsov	22 – 11 (11–2)	Francisco Jones; Martim Marques
3	Patrik Dimitrov; Simay Mehmedova	33 – 23 (11–12)	Tiago Berenguer; Rafaela Silva
4	Elena Popivanova	44 – 29 (11–6)	Maribel Sousa
5	Elena Popivanova; Viktoriya Popova	55 – 37 (11–8)	Rafaela Silva; Maribel Sousa
		(Bulgaria) 2–0 (Portugal)
6	Georgi Ruptsov	6 – 11 (6–11)	Tiago Berenguer
7	Teodor Mitev; Maïkel Popov	18 – 22 (12–11)	Tiago Berenguer; Francisco Jones
8	Teodor Mitev; Elena Popivanova	26 – 33 (8–11)	Tiago Berenguer; Rafaela Silva
9	Lilly Radeva	41 – 44 (15–11)	Rafaela Silva
10	Elena Popivanova; Viktoriya Popova	55 – 53 (14–9)	Rafaela Silva; Maribel Sousa
Tie won by Bulgaria
11	Teodor Mitev	– Not played	Tiago Berenguer
12	Teodor Mitev; Georgi Ruptsov	– Not played	Tiago Berenguer; Francisco Jones
13	Georgi Ruptsov; Elena Popivanova	– Not played	Tiago Berenguer; Rafaela Silva
14	Elena Popivanova	– Not played	Maribel Sousa
15	Elena Popivanova; Viktoriya Popova	– Not played	Rafaela Silva; Maribel Sousa

==== Finland vs Poland ====
Finland
0
Tatabányai Multifunkcionális Csarnok, Court 3
18 August 2026, 15:00 UTC+2

Poland
2

		Result
		(Finland) 0–1 (Poland)
1	Ananya Kandala	4 – 11 (4–11)	Olga Szwarnowiecka
2	Axel Gras	14 – 22 (10–11)	Jakub Dulemba
3	Sanni Lehtinen; Unni Parikka	15 – 33 (1–11)	Dominika Bartłomiejczuk; Wiktoria Kaletka
4	Axel Gras; Sam Lindberg	25 – 44 (10–11)	Szymon Gwiazda; Mateusz Michalik
5	Jussi Soraluoma; Sanni Lehtinen	31 – 55 (6–11)	Pawel Kiszczyk; Hanna Stachera
		(Finland) 0–2 (Poland)
6	Cecilia Lehtinen	8 – 11 (8–11)	Wiktoria Kaletka
7	Jussi Soraluoma	17 – 22 (9–11)	Jakub Mazurek
8	Ananya Kandala; Cecilia Lehtinen	24 – 33 (7–11)	Hanna Stachera; Zuzanna Żemła
9	Akseli Hämeenheimo; Johannes Lehtinen	29 – 44 (5–11)	Pawel Kiszczyk; Mateusz Michalik
10	Sam Lindberg; Unni Parikka	30 – 55 (1–11)	Szymon Gwiazda; Wiktoria Kaletka
Tie won by Poland
11	Unni Parikka	– Not played	Wiktoria Kaletka
12	Axel Gras	– Not played	Jakub Dulemba
13	Ananya Kandala; Sanni Lehtinen	– Not played	Dominika Bartłomiejczuk; Wiktoria Kaletka
14	Akseli Hämeenheimo; Sam Lindberg	– Not played	Pawel Kiszczyk; Mateusz Michalik
15	Johannes Lehtinen; Sanni Lehtinen	– Not played	Pawel Kiszczyk; Dominika Bartłomiejczuk

==== Poland vs Portugal ====
Poland
2
Tatabányai Multifunkcionális Csarnok, Court 2
19 August 2026, 12:00 UTC+2

Portugal
0

		Result
		(Poland) 1–0 (Portugal)
1	Jakub Dulemba	3 – 11 (3–11)	Tiago Berenguer
2	Hanna Stachera; Zuzanna Żemła	22 – 21 (19–10)	Rafaela Silva; Maribel Sousa
3	Szymon Gwiazda; Jakub Mazurek	33 – 30 (11–9)	Tiago Berenguer; Francisco Jones
4	Wiktoria Kaletka	44 – 38 (11–8)	Maribel Sousa
5	Pawel Kiszczyk; Dominika Bartłomiejczuk	55 – 43 (11–5)	Tiago Berenguer; Rafaela Silva
		(Poland) 2–0 (Portugal)
6	Szymon Gwiazda	5 – 11 (5–11)	Cesar Rodrigues
7	Dominika Bartłomiejczuk; Wiktoria Kaletka	22 – 17 (17–6)	Elisabete Horban; Rafaela Silva
8	Pawel Kiszczyk; Mateusz Michalik	33 – 25 (11–8)	Tiago Berenguer; Francisco Jones
9	Olga Szwarnowiecka	44 – 29 (11–4)	Maribel Sousa
10	Pawel Kiszczyk; Dominika Bartłomiejczuk	55 – 33 (11–4)	Martim Marques; Rafaela Silva
Tie won by Poland
11	Jakub Dulemba	– Not played	Tiago Berenguer
12	Dominika Bartłomiejczuk; Wiktoria Kaletka	– Not played	Rafaela Silva; Maribel Sousa
13	Pawel Kiszczyk; Mateusz Michalik	– Not played	Tiago Berenguer; Francisco Jones
14	Wiktoria Kaletka	– Not played	Maribel Sousa
15	Pawel Kiszczyk; Dominika Bartłomiejczuk	– Not played	Tiago Berenguer; Rafaela Silva

==== Bulgaria vs Finland ====
Bulgaria
2
Tatabányai Multifunkcionális Csarnok, Court 4
19 August 2026, 12:00 UTC+2

Finland
0

		Result
		(Bulgaria) 1–0 (Finland)
1	Elena Popivanova; Viktoriya Popova	11 – 2 (11–2)	Ananya Kandala; Cecilia Lehtinen
2	Patrik Dimitrov; Simay Mehmedova	22 – 16 (11–14)	Jussi Soraluoma; Cecilia Lehtinen
3	Teodor Mitev	33 – 21 (11–5)	Jussi Soraluoma
4	Stiliyan Nanovski; Georgi Ruptsov	44 – 28 (11–7)	Akseli Hämeenheimo; Johannes Lehtinen
5	Elena Popivanova	55 – 31 (11–3)	Unni Parikka
		(Bulgaria) 2–0 (Finland)
6	Simay Mehmedova; Aleksandra Peykova	11 – 8 (11–8)	Sanni Lehtinen; Unni Parikka
7	Georgi Ruptsov; Elena Popivanova	22 – 15 (11–7)	Sam Lindberg; Sanni Lehtinen
8	Teodor Mitev	33 – 28 (11–13)	Axel Gras
9	Teodor Mitev; Maïkel Popov	44 – 35 (11–7)	Axel Gras; Sam Lindberg
10	Lilly Radeva	55 – 41 (11–6)	Ananya Kandala
Tie won by Bulgaria
11	Elena Popivanova; Viktoriya Popova	– Not played	Sanni Lehtinen; Unni Parikka
12	Patrik Dimitrov; Elena Popivanova	– Not played	Jussi Soraluoma; Sanni Lehtinen
13	Georgi Ruptsov	– Not played	Johannes Lehtinen
14	Teodor Mitev; Georgi Ruptsov	– Not played	Axel Gras; Sam Lindberg
15	Elena Popivanova	– Not played	Cecilia Lehtinen

==== Bulgaria vs Poland ====
Bulgaria
2
Tatabányai Multifunkcionális Csarnok, Court 3
20 August 2026, 09:00 UTC+2

Poland
1

		Result
		(Bulgaria) 0–1 (Poland)
1	Georgi Ruptsov; Elena Popivanova	11 – 10 (11–10)	Pawel Kiszczyk; Dominika Bartłomiejczuk
2	Teodor Mitev	22 – 18 (11–8)	Jakub Mazurek
3	Elena Popivanova; Viktoriya Popova	27 – 33 (5–15)	Dominika Bartłomiejczuk; Wiktoria Kaletka
4	Teodor Mitev; Georgi Ruptsov	35 – 44 (8–11)	Pawel Kiszczyk; Mateusz Michalik
5	Elena Popivanova	45 – 55 (10–11)	Wiktoria Kaletka
		(Bulgaria) 1–1 (Poland)
6	Georgi Ruptsov; Elena Popivanova	9 – 11 (9–11)	Pawel Kiszczyk; Dominika Bartłomiejczuk
7	Teodor Mitev	22 – 14 (13–3)	Jakub Mazurek
8	Simay Mehmedova; Elena Popivanova	32 – 33 (10–19)	Dominika Bartłomiejczuk; Wiktoria Kaletka
9	Teodor Mitev; Georgi Ruptsov	43 – 44 (11–11)	Pawel Kiszczyk; Mateusz Michalik
10	Elena Popivanova	55 – 51 (12–7)	Olga Szwarnowiecka
		(Bulgaria) 2–1 (Poland)
11	Georgi Ruptsov; Simay Mehmedova	11 – 10 (11–10)	Pawel Kiszczyk; Dominika Bartłomiejczuk
12	Teodor Mitev	22 – 19 (11–9)	Jakub Dulemba
13	Simay Mehmedova; Elena Popivanova	31 – 33 (9–14)	Dominika Bartłomiejczuk; Wiktoria Kaletka
14	Teodor Mitev; Georgi Ruptsov	44 – 42 (13–9)	Pawel Kiszczyk; Mateusz Michalik
15	Elena Popivanova	55 – 48 (11–6)	Wiktoria Kaletka
Tie won by Bulgaria

==== Finland vs Portugal ====
Finland
1
Tatabányai Multifunkcionális Csarnok, Court 5
20 August 2026, 09:00 UTC+2

Portugal
2

		Result
		(Finland) 0–1 (Portugal)
1	Axel Gras; Sam Lindberg	11 – 8 (11–8)	Cesar Rodrigues; Tomas Rodrigues
2	Sanni Lehtinen; Unni Parikka	22 – 13 (11–5)	Rafaela Silva; Maribel Sousa
3	Sam Lindberg; Unni Parikka	33 – 25 (11–12)	Francisco Jones; Rafaela Silva
4	Ananya Kandala	44 – 34 (11–9)	Rafaela Silva
5	Axel Gras	49 – 55 (5–21)	Tiago Berenguer
		(Finland) 1–1 (Portugal)
6	Akseli Hämeenheimo; Sam Lindberg	11 – 8 (11–8)	Francisco Jones; Martim Marques
7	Ananya Kandala; Cecilia Lehtinen	19 – 22 (8–14)	Elisabete Horban; Rafaela Silva
8	Sam Lindberg; Sanni Lehtinen	23 – 33 (4–11)	Tiago Berenguer; Rafaela Silva
9	Cecilia Lehtinen	30 – 44 (7–11)	Rafaela Silva
10	Axel Gras	55 – 52 (25–8)	Cesar Rodrigues
		(Finland) 1–2 (Portugal)
11	Axel Gras; Sam Lindberg	4 – 11 (4–11)	Tiago Berenguer; Francisco Jones
12	Ananya Kandala; Unni Parikka	8 – 22 (4–11)	Elisabete Horban; Rafaela Silva
13	Sam Lindberg; Sanni Lehtinen	16 – 33 (8–11)	Tiago Berenguer; Rafaela Silva
14	Ananya Kandala	23 – 44 (7–11)	Maribel Sousa
15	Sam Lindberg	28 – 55 (5–11)	Tiago Berenguer
Tie won by Portugal

=== Group B1 ===
Pos	Team	Pld	W	L	MF	MA	MD	GF	GA	GD	PF	PA	PD	Pts	Qualification	Estonia	Czech Republic	Austria	Ireland
1	Estonia	3	3	0	6	1	+5	13	4	+9	382	313	+69	3	Advance to knockout stage	—	2–0	2–1	2–0
2	Czech Republic	3	2	1	4	2	+2	9	7	+2	311	259	+52	2			—	2–0	2–0
3	Austria	3	1	2	3	4	−1	7	9	−2	315	367	−52	1				—	2–0
4	Ireland	3	0	3	0	6	−6	1	13	−12	261	330	−69	0					—

Source: BWF

==== Ireland vs Estonia ====
Ireland
0
Tatabányai Multifunkcionális Csarnok, Court 2
18 August 2026, 09:00 UTC+2

Estonia
2

		Result
		(Republic of Ireland) 0–1 (Estonia)
1	Hannah Shochan	8 – 11 (8–11)	Marija Paskotši
2	Conor Blakeman; Corey Chambers	20 – 22 (12–11)	Karl Mattias Pedai; Priit Põder
3	Amira Pender; Hannah Shochan	27 – 33 (7–11)	Kaisa Liis Lepp; Romili Vakk
4	Jun-Jie Rong	31 – 44 (4–11)	Marti Joost
5	Corey Chambers; Amira Pender	42 – 55 (11–11)	Rasmus Roogsoo; Lumikki Liias
		(Republic of Ireland) 0–2 (Estonia)
6	Carol Joy	11 – 8 (11–8)	Marija Paskotši
7	Conor Blakeman; Corey Chambers	21 – 22 (10–14)	Karl Mattias Pedai; Priit Põder
8	Amira Pender; Hannah Shochan	32 – 33 (11–11)	Kaisa Liis Lepp; Romili Vakk
9	Jun-Jie Rong	36 – 44 (4–11)	Marti Joost
10	Corey Chambers; Amira Pender	42 – 55 (6–11)	Rasmus Roogsoo; Lumikki Liias
Tie won by Estonia
11	Hannah Shochan	– Not played	Marija Paskotši
12	Conor Blakeman; Corey Chambers	– Not played	Marti Joost; Rasmus Roogsoo
13	Amira Pender; Hannah Shochan	– Not played	Lumikki Liias; Marija Paskotši
14	Jun-Jie Rong	– Not played	Marti Joost
15	Corey Chambers; Amira Pender	– Not played	Rasmus Roogsoo; Lumikki Liias

==== Czech Republic vs Austria ====
Czech Republic
2
Tatabányai Multifunkcionális Csarnok, Court 4
18 August 2026, 09:00 UTC+2

Austria
0

		Result
		(Czech Republic) 1–0 (Austria)
1	Amélie Maixnerová	11 – 4 (11–4)	Fiona Scrinzi
2	Erika Osičková; Adéla Turoňová	22 – 10 (11–6)	Fiona Scrinzi; Matilda Simma
3	Lukáš Patzák; Erika Osičková	33 – 12 (11–2)	Thomas Wiesler; Jana Weissenbach
4	Kryštof Coufal; Filip Titěra	44 – 17 (11–5)	Moritz Vogel; Shangzu Zhan
5	Lukáš Patzák	55 – 21 (11–4)	Moritz Vogel
		(Czech Republic) 2–0 (Austria)
6	Amélie Maixnerová	11 – 8 (11–8)	Fiona Scrinzi
7	Erika Osičková; Adéla Turoňová	22 – 21 (11–13)	Fiona Scrinzi; Matilda Simma
8	Filip Titěra; Amélie Maixnerová	33 – 27 (11–6)	Thomas Wiesler; Jana Weissenbach
9	Vojtěch Strejček; Lukáš Thor	44 – 32 (11–5)	Moritz Vogel; Shangzu Zhan
10	Petr Bříza	55 – 46 (11–14)	Moritz Vogel
Tie won by Czech Republic
11	Amélie Maixnerová	– Not played	Fiona Scrinzi
12	Erika Osičková; Adéla Turoňová	– Not played	Fiona Scrinzi; Matilda Simma
13	Lukáš Patzák; Erika Osičková	– Not played	Thomas Wiesler; Jana Weissenbach
14	Kryštof Coufal; Filip Titěra	– Not played	Moritz Vogel; Shangzu Zhan
15	Lukáš Patzák	– Not played	Moritz Vogel

==== Czech Republic vs Ireland ====
Czech Republic
2
Tatabányai Multifunkcionális Csarnok, Court 1
19 August 2026, 15:00 UTC+2

Ireland
0

		Result
		(Czech Republic) 1–0 (Republic of Ireland)
1	Lukáš Patzák	11 – 5 (11–5)	Aiden Biju Joy
2	Amélie Maixnerová	22 – 16 (11–11)	Carol Joy
3	Kryštof Coufal; Filip Titěra	33 – 22 (11–6)	Conor Blakeman; Corey Chambers
4	Erika Osičková; Adéla Turoňová	44 – 32 (11–10)	Anna Lucey O'Sullivan; Hannah Shochan
5	Lukáš Patzák; Erika Osičková	55 – 41 (11–9)	Corey Chambers; Amira Pender
		(Czech Republic) 2–0 (Republic of Ireland)
6	Petr Bříza	11 – 7 (11–7)	Jun-Jie Rong
7	Amélie Maixnerová	22 – 16 (11–9)	Carol Joy
8	Vojtěch Strejček; Lukáš Thor	33 – 25 (11–9)	Conor Blakeman; Corey Chambers
9	Erika Osičková; Adéla Turoňová	44 – 31 (11–6)	Anna Lucey O'Sullivan; Hannah Shochan
10	Filip Titěra; Amélie Maixnerová	55 – 41 (11–10)	Corey Chambers; Amira Pender
Tie won by Czech Republic
11	Lukáš Patzák	– Not played	Aiden Biju Joy
12	Amélie Maixnerová	– Not played	Carol Joy
13	Kryštof Coufal; Filip Titěra	– Not played	Conor Blakeman; Corey Chambers
14	Erika Osičková; Adéla Turoňová	– Not played	Anna Lucey O'Sullivan; Hannah Shochan
15	Lukáš Patzák; Erika Osičková	– Not played	Corey Chambers; Amira Pender

==== Estonia vs Austria ====
Estonia
2
Tatabányai Multifunkcionális Csarnok, Court 3
19 August 2026, 15:00 UTC+2

Austria
1

		Result
		(Estonia) 1–0 (Austria)
1	Romili Vakk	11 – 8 (11–8)	Fiona Scrinzi
2	Marti Joost; Rasmus Roogsoo	22 – 14 (11–6)	Thomas Wiesler; Shangzu Zhan
3	Rasmus Roogsoo; Lumikki Liias	33 – 24 (11–10)	Shangzu Zhan; Natalia Galova
4	Lumikki Liias; Marija Paskotši	44 – 34 (11–10)	Fiona Scrinzi; Matilda Simma
5	Marti Joost	55 – 48 (11–14)	Moritz Vogel
		(Estonia) 1–1 (Austria)
6	Marija Paskotši	8 – 11 (8–11)	Fiona Scrinzi
7	Karl Mattias Pedai; Priit Põder	18 – 22 (10–11)	Thomas Wiesler; Shangzu Zhan
8	Rasmus Roogsoo; Lumikki Liias	30 – 33 (12–11)	Shangzu Zhan; Natalia Galova
9	Kaisa Liis Lepp; Romili Vakk	36 – 44 (6–11)	Fiona Scrinzi; Matilda Simma
10	Marti Joost	52 – 55 (16–11)	Moritz Vogel
		(Estonia) 2–1 (Austria)
11	Romili Vakk	4 – 11 (4–11)	Fiona Scrinzi
12	Marti Joost; Rasmus Roogsoo	22 – 16 (18–5)	Thomas Wiesler; Shangzu Zhan
13	Rasmus Roogsoo; Lumikki Liias	33 – 26 (11–10)	Shangzu Zhan; Natalia Galova
14	Lumikki Liias; Marija Paskotši	44 – 31 (11–5)	Fiona Scrinzi; Matilda Simma
15	Marti Joost	55 – 35 (11–4)	Moritz Vogel
Tie won by Estonia

==== Ireland vs Austria ====
Ireland
0
Tatabányai Multifunkcionális Csarnok, Court 2
20 August 2026, 12:00 UTC+2

Austria
2

		Result
		(Republic of Ireland) 0–1 (Austria)
1	Anna Lucey O'Sullivan; Amira Pender	8 – 11 (8–11)	Fiona Scrinzi; Matilda Simma
2	Conor Blakeman; Corey Chambers	17 – 22 (9–11)	Thomas Wiesler; Shangzu Zhan
3	Conor Blakeman; Anna Lucey O'Sullivan	29 – 33 (12–11)	Thomas Wiesler; Jana Weissenbach
4	Hannah Shochan	41 – 44 (12–11)	Fiona Scrinzi
5	Jun-Jie Rong	48 – 55 (7–11)	Moritz Vogel
		(Republic of Ireland) 0–2 (Austria)
6	Amira Pender; Hannah Shochan	7 – 11 (7–11)	Fiona Scrinzi; Matilda Simma
7	Conor Blakeman; Corey Chambers	21 – 22 (14–11)	Thomas Wiesler; Shangzu Zhan
8	Corey Chambers; Amira Pender	27 – 33 (6–11)	Thomas Wiesler; Jana Weissenbach
9	Carol Joy	37 – 44 (10–11)	Fiona Scrinzi
10	Aiden Biju Joy	47 – 55 (10–11)	Moritz Vogel
Tie won by Austria
11	Amira Pender; Hannah Shochan	– Not played	Fiona Scrinzi; Matilda Simma
12	Conor Blakeman; Corey Chambers	– Not played	Thomas Wiesler; Shangzu Zhan
13	Corey Chambers; Amira Pender	– Not played	Thomas Wiesler; Jana Weissenbach
14	Hannah Shochan	– Not played	Fiona Scrinzi
15	Jun-Jie Rong	– Not played	Moritz Vogel

==== Czech Republic vs Estonia ====
Czech Republic
0
Tatabányai Multifunkcionális Csarnok, Court 4
20 August 2026, 12:00 UTC+2

Estonia
2

		Result
		(Czech Republic) 0–1 (Estonia)
1	Kryštof Coufal; Filip Titěra	9 – 11 (9–11)	Marti Joost; Rasmus Roogsoo
2	Amélie Maixnerová	20 – 22 (11–11)	Marija Paskotši
3	Lukáš Patzák	31 – 33 (11–11)	Marti Joost
4	Erika Osičková; Adéla Turoňová	31 – 44 (0–11)	Lumikki Liias; Marija Paskotši
5	Lukáš Patzák; Erika Osičková	37 – 55 (6–11)	Rasmus Roogsoo; Lumikki Liias
		(Czech Republic) 0–2 (Estonia)
6	Vojtěch Strejček; Lukáš Thor	11 – 8 (11–8)	Marti Joost; Rasmus Roogsoo
7	Amélie Maixnerová	22 – 14 (11–6)	Marija Paskotši
8	Lukáš Patzák	33 – 26 (11–12)	Marti Joost
9	Erika Osičková; Adéla Turoňová	38 – 44 (5–18)	Lumikki Liias; Marija Paskotši
10	Filip Titěra; Amélie Maixnerová	54 – 55 (16–11)	Rasmus Roogsoo; Lumikki Liias
Tie won by Estonia
11	Kryštof Coufal; Filip Titěra	– Not played	Marti Joost; Rasmus Roogsoo
12	Amélie Maixnerová	– Not played	Marija Paskotši
13	Lukáš Patzák	– Not played	Marti Joost
14	Erika Osičková; Adéla Turoňová	– Not played	Lumikki Liias; Marija Paskotši
15	Lukáš Patzák; Erika Osičková	– Not played	Rasmus Roogsoo; Lumikki Liias

=== Group B2 ===
Pos	Team	Pld	W	L	MF	MA	MD	GF	GA	GD	PF	PA	PD	Pts	Qualification	Germany	Sweden	Lithuania	Luxembourg
1	Germany	3	3	0	6	1	+5	13	4	+9	375	317	+58	3	Advance to knockout stage	—	2–1	2–0	2–0
2	Sweden	3	2	1	5	3	+2	11	8	+3	423	385	+38	2			—	2–1	2–0
3	Lithuania	3	1	2	3	4	−1	9	10	−1	351	360	−9	1				—	2–0
4	Luxembourg	3	0	3	0	6	−6	2	13	−11	243	330	−87	0					—

Source: BWF

==== Germany vs Sweden ====
Germany
2
Tatabányai Multifunkcionális Csarnok, Court 1
18 August 2026, 09:00 UTC+2

Sweden
1

		Result
		(Germany) 0–1 (Sweden)
1	Kalliope Hermel; Maike Iffland	11 – 7 (11–7)	Anvita Harakamani; Greta Ribokas
2	Lisa Paula Bonnemann	20 – 22 (9–15)	Xiaoyin Liang
3	Fynn Ohliger; Kalliope Hermel	28 – 33 (8–11)	Josef Fang; Aiwei Sun
4	Leon Kaschura	34 – 44 (6–11)	Adam Medin
5	Linus Emmerich; Fynn Ohliger	45 – 55 (11–11)	Tobias Niemi Ström; Josef Fang
		(Germany) 1–1 (Sweden)
6	Kalliope Hermel; Maike Iffland	11 – 4 (11–4)	Anvita Harakamani; Greta Ribokas
7	Lisa Paula Bonnemann	22 – 13 (11–9)	Xiaoyin Liang
8	Jakob Sjöblom; Marie Fein	33 – 31 (11–18)	Josef Fang; Aiwei Sun
9	Mats Wohlers	44 – 37 (11–6)	Adam Medin
10	Linus Emmerich; Fynn Ohliger	55 – 46 (11–9)	William Fjällby; Josef Fang
		(Germany) 2–1 (Sweden)
11	Kalliope Hermel; Maike Iffland	11 – 8 (11–8)	Xiaoyin Liang; Greta Ribokas
12	Lisa Paula Bonnemann	22 – 18 (11–10)	Xiaoyin Liang
13	Jakob Sjöblom; Marie Fein	32 – 33 (10–15)	Josef Fang; Aiwei Sun
14	Mats Wohlers	42 – 44 (10–11)	Javier Alonso Cabahug
15	Linus Emmerich; Fynn Ohliger	55 – 54 (13–10)	Tobias Niemi Ström; Josef Fang
Tie won by Germany

==== Luxembourg vs Lithuania ====
Luxembourg
0
Tatabányai Multifunkcionális Csarnok, Court 3
18 August 2026, 09:00 UTC+2

Lithuania
2

		Result
		(Luxembourg) 0–1 (Lithuania)
1	Daria Demchykhina	9 – 11 (9–11)	Jorūnė Salnaitė
2	Aurel Pulcinella	16 – 22 (7–11)	Dominik Tankevič
3	Daria Demchykhina; Jill Felten	32 – 33 (16–11)	Ieva Paskevičiūtė; Giedra Velykytė
4	Luca Perfido; Jill Felten	39 – 44 (7–11)	Joris Ivanauskas; Uma Ivanauskaitė
5	Luca Perfido; Maximilian Zeimes	46 – 55 (7–11)	Daniel Leonovič; Rokas Lesinskas
		(Luxembourg) 0–2 (Lithuania)
6	Daria Demchykhina	11 – 8 (11–8)	Jorūnė Salnaitė
7	Filip Liska	18 – 22 (7–14)	Dominik Tankevič
8	Daria Demchykhina; Jill Felten	33 – 31 (15–9)	Ieva Paskevičiūtė; Giedra Velykytė
9	Luca Perfido; Jill Felten	40 – 44 (7–13)	Joris Ivanauskas; Uma Ivanauskaitė
10	Luca Perfido; Maximilian Zeimes	46 – 55 (6–11)	Daniel Leonovič; Rokas Lesinskas
Tie won by Lithuania
11	Daria Demchykhina	– Not played	Jorūnė Salnaitė
12	Filip Liska	– Not played	Dominik Tankevič
13	Daria Demchykhina; Jill Felten	– Not played	Ieva Paskevičiūtė; Giedra Velykytė
14	Luca Perfido; Jill Felten	– Not played	Joris Ivanauskas; Uma Ivanauskaitė
15	Luca Perfido; Maximilian Zeimes	– Not played	Daniel Leonovič; Rokas Lesinskas

==== Germany vs Luxembourg ====
Germany
2
Tatabányai Multifunkcionális Csarnok, Court 2
19 August 2026, 15:00 UTC+2

Luxembourg
0

		Result
		(Germany) 1–0 (Luxembourg)
1	Milan Zeisig	11 – 4 (11–4)	Filip Liska
2	Kalliope Hermel; Maike Iffland	22 – 7 (11–3)	Daria Demchykhina; Rebecca Lo Cane
3	Sarah Nickel	33 – 16 (11–9)	Daria Demchykhina
4	Jarno Deters; Jakob Sjöblom	44 – 28 (11–12)	Luca Perfido; Maximilian Zeimes
5	Fynn Ohliger; Kalliope Hermel	55 – 33 (11–5)	Maximilian Zeimes; Rebecca Lo Cane
		(Germany) 2–0 (Luxembourg)
6	Leon Kaschura	9 – 11 (9–11)	Aurel Pulcinella
7	Juna Bartsch; Marie Fein	22 – 15 (13–4)	Daria Demchykhina; Rebecca Lo Cane
8	Charlotte Wendt	33 – 25 (11–10)	Daria Demchykhina
9	Linus Emmerich; Fynn Ohliger	44 – 28 (11–3)	Luca Perfido; Maximilian Zeimes
10	Jakob Sjöblom; Marie Fein	55 – 34 (11–6)	Maximilian Zeimes; Daria Demchykhina
Tie won by Germany
11	Milan Zeisig	– Not played	Filip Liska
12	Kalliope Hermel; Maike Iffland	– Not played	Daria Demchykhina; Rebecca Lo Cane
13	Lisa Paula Bonnemann	– Not played	Daria Demchykhina
14	Linus Emmerich; Fynn Ohliger	– Not played	Luca Perfido; Maximilian Zeimes
15	Fynn Ohliger; Kalliope Hermel	– Not played	Maximilian Zeimes; Rebecca Lo Cane

==== Lithuania vs Sweden ====
Lithuania
1
Tatabányai Multifunkcionális Csarnok, Court 4
19 August 2026, 15:00 UTC+2

Sweden
2

		Result
		(Lithuania) 1–0 (Sweden)
1	Joris Ivanauskas; Uma Ivanauskaitė	8 – 11 (8–11)	Josef Fang; Aiwei Sun
2	Uma Ivanauskaitė; Jorūnė Salnaitė	22 – 17 (14–6)	Anvita Harakamani; Greta Ribokas
3	Giedra Velykytė	32 – 33 (10–16)	Xiaoyin Liang
4	Daniel Leonovič; Rokas Lesinskas	44 – 43 (12–10)	Tobias Niemi Ström; Josef Fang
5	Rokas Lesinskas	55 – 48 (11–5)	Felus Ding
		(Lithuania) 1–1 (Sweden)
6	Joris Ivanauskas; Uma Ivanauskaitė	7 – 11 (7–11)	Josef Fang; Aiwei Sun
7	Uma Ivanauskaitė; Jorūnė Salnaitė	22 – 20 (15–9)	Xiaoyin Liang; Aiwei Sun
8	Giedra Velykytė	33 – 29 (11–9)	Xiaoyin Liang
9	Daniel Leonovič; Rokas Lesinskas	42 – 44 (9–15)	Adam Medin; Josef Fang
10	Dominik Tankevič	48 – 55 (6–11)	Adam Medin
		(Lithuania) 1–2 (Sweden)
11	Dominik Tankevič; Uma Ivanauskaitė	9 – 11 (9–11)	Josef Fang; Aiwei Sun
12	Uma Ivanauskaitė; Jorūnė Salnaitė	20 – 22 (11–11)	Anvita Harakamani; Aiwei Sun
13	Giedra Velykytė	21 – 33 (1–11)	Xiaoyin Liang
14	Daniel Leonovič; Rokas Lesinskas	32 – 44 (11–11)	Adam Medin; Josef Fang
15	Rokas Lesinskas	43 – 55 (11–11)	Javier Alonso Cabahug
Tie won by Sweden

==== Germany vs Lithuania ====
Germany
2
Tatabányai Multifunkcionális Csarnok, Court 3
20 August 2026, 12:00 UTC+2

Lithuania
0

		Result
		(Germany) 1–0 (Lithuania)
1	Lisa Paula Bonnemann	11 – 8 (11–8)	Jorūnė Salnaitė
2	Fynn Ohliger; Kalliope Hermel	22 – 18 (11–10)	Daniel Leonovič; Ieva Paskevičiūtė
3	Mats Wohlers	33 – 32 (11–14)	Rokas Lesinskas
4	Kalliope Hermel; Maike Iffland	44 – 40 (11–8)	Uma Ivanauskaitė; Jorūnė Salnaitė
5	Linus Emmerich; Fynn Ohliger	55 – 46 (11–6)	Daniel Leonovič; Rokas Lesinskas
		(Germany) 2–0 (Lithuania)
6	Lisa Paula Bonnemann	3 – 11 (3–11)	Jorūnė Salnaitė
7	Jakob Sjöblom; Marie Fein	11 – 22 (8–11)	Daniel Leonovič; Ieva Paskevičiūtė
8	Milan Zeisig	24 – 33 (13–11)	Dominik Tankevič
9	Kalliope Hermel; Maike Iffland	43 – 44 (19–11)	Uma Ivanauskaitė; Jorūnė Salnaitė
10	Linus Emmerich; Fynn Ohliger	55 – 49 (12–5)	Joris Ivanauskas; Dominik Tankevič
Tie won by Germany
11	Lisa Paula Bonnemann	– Not played	Giedra Velykytė
12	Fynn Ohliger; Kalliope Hermel	– Not played	Joris Ivanauskas; Uma Ivanauskaitė
13	Mats Wohlers	– Not played	Dominik Tankevič
14	Kalliope Hermel; Maike Iffland	– Not played	Ieva Paskevičiūtė; Giedra Velykytė
15	Linus Emmerich; Fynn Ohliger	– Not played	Joris Ivanauskas; Dominik Tankevič

==== Luxembourg vs Sweden ====
Luxembourg
0
Tatabányai Multifunkcionális Csarnok, Court 5
20 August 2026, 12:00 UTC+2

Sweden
2

		Result
		(Luxembourg) 0–1 (Sweden)
1	Daria Demchykhina; Jill Felten	5 – 11 (5–11)	Anvita Harakamani; Aiwei Sun
2	Filip Liska	7 – 22 (2–11)	Felus Ding
3	Daria Demchykhina	17 – 33 (10–11)	Anvita Harakamani
4	Filip Liska; Jill Felten	26 – 44 (9–11)	William Fjällby; Greta Ribokas
5	Luca Perfido; Maximilian Zeimes	34 – 55 (8–11)	Sigge Askeroth; William Fjällby
		(Luxembourg) 0–2 (Sweden)
6	Daria Demchykhina; Jill Felten	11 – 9 (11–9)	Anvita Harakamani; Greta Ribokas
7	Filip Liska	17 – 22 (6–13)	Felus Ding
8	Daria Demchykhina	32 – 33 (15–11)	Anvita Harakamani
9	Filip Liska; Jill Felten	43 – 44 (11–11)	Sigge Askeroth; Aiwei Sun
10	Luca Perfido; Maximilian Zeimes	50 – 55 (7–11)	Sigge Askeroth; William Fjällby
Tie won by Sweden
11	Daria Demchykhina; Jill Felten	– Not played	Anvita Harakamani; Aiwei Sun
12	Filip Liska	– Not played	Felus Ding
13	Daria Demchykhina	– Not played	Xiaoyin Liang
14	Filip Liska; Jill Felten	– Not played	William Fjällby; Greta Ribokas
15	Luca Perfido; Maximilian Zeimes	– Not played	Sigge Askeroth; William Fjällby

=== Group C1 ===
Pos	Team	Pld	W	L	MF	MA	MD	GF	GA	GD	PF	PA	PD	Pts	Qualification	Turkey	Ukraine	Italy	Croatia
1	Turkey	3	3	0	6	0	+6	29	1	+28	330	205	+125	3	Advance to knockout stage	—	2–0	2–0	2–0
2	Ukraine	3	2	1	4	2	+2	18	12	+6	294	241	+53	2			—	2–0	2–0
3	Italy	3	1	2	2	4	−2	3	27	−24	231	323	−92	1				—	2–0
4	Croatia	3	0	3	0	6	−6	10	20	−10	244	330	−86	0					—

Source: BWF

==== Turkey vs Croatia ====
Turkey
2
Tatabányai Multifunkcionális Csarnok, Court 2
18 August 2026, 12:00 UTC+2

Croatia
0

		Result
		(Turkey) 1–0 (Croatia)
1	Nimet Ergün	9 – 11 (9–11)	Ana Pranić
2	Elifnur Demir; Zeynep Berre Ocakoğlu	22 – 15 (13–4)	Ana Pranić; Maja Pranić
3	Mehmet Can Töremiş	33 – 19 (11–4)	Vito Radovanović
4	Gökay Göl; Nisa Nur Çimen	44 – 27 (11–8)	Vito Radovanović; Ana Pranić
5	Gökay Göl; Mert Seven	55 – 32 (11–5)	Tin Radovanović; Marko Šurina
		(Turkey) 2–0 (Croatia)
6	Aleyna Korkut	11 – 9 (11–9)	Maja Pranić
7	Irmak Rana Yemişen; Yagmur Tuana Yemisen	22 – 13 (11–4)	Ana Pranić; Maja Pranić
8	Yiğitcan Erol	33 – 22 (11–9)	Vid Borota
9	Mert Seven; Aysu Arslan	44 – 28 (11–6)	Vito Radovanović; Ana Pranić
10	Fatih Erdoğan; Muhammed Hasim Turksoy	55 – 34 (11–6)	Vid Borota; Marko Šurina
Tie won by Turkey
11	Aleyna Korkut	– Not played	Ana Pranić
12	Aysu Arslan; Nisa Nur Çimen	– Not played	Ana Pranić; Maja Pranić
13	Mehmet Can Töremiş	– Not played	Vito Radovanović
14	Gökay Göl; Nisa Nur Çimen	– Not played	Marko Šurina; Maja Pranić
15	Gökay Göl; Mert Seven	– Not played	Tin Radovanović; Marko Šurina

==== Italy vs Ukraine ====
Italy
0
Tatabányai Multifunkcionális Csarnok, Court 4
18 August 2026, 12:00 UTC+2

Ukraine
2

		Result
		(Italy) 0–1 (Ukraine)
1	Karl Ladurner; Lena Kobler	3 – 11 (3–11)	Vladyslav Kunin; Varvara Poperezhai
2	Davide Izzo; Sebastian Tataru	9 – 22 (6–11)	Ihor Belinskyi; Roman Karatanov
3	Anna Hell	12 – 33 (3–11)	Raiia Almalalha
4	Davide Izzo	23 – 44 (11–11)	Vladyslav Kunin
5	Anna Hell; Margherita Tognetti	28 – 55 (5–11)	Raiia Almalalha; Sofiia Bielobrovchuk
		(Italy) 0–2 (Ukraine)
6	Karl Ladurner; Lena Kobler	2 – 11 (2–11)	Vladyslav Kunin; Varvara Poperezhai
7	Davide Izzo; Sebastian Tataru	10 – 22 (8–11)	Ihor Belinskyi; Roman Karatanov
8	Anna Hell	17 – 33 (7–11)	Raiia Almalalha
9	Davide Izzo	23 – 44 (6–11)	Vladyslav Kunin
10	Anna Hell; Margherita Tognetti	28 – 55 (5–11)	Varvara Poperezhai; Kseniia Rozhkovan
Tie won by Ukraine
11	Karl Ladurner; Lena Kobler	– Not played	Vladyslav Kunin; Varvara Poperezhai
12	Davide Izzo; Sebastian Tataru	– Not played	Roman Karatanov; Vladyslav Kunin
13	Anna Hell	– Not played	Raiia Almalalha
14	Davide Izzo	– Not played	Vladyslav Kunin
15	Anna Hell; Margherita Tognetti	– Not played	Raiia Almalalha; Varvara Poperezhai

==== Ukraine vs Croatia ====
Ukraine
2
Tatabányai Multifunkcionális Csarnok, Court 1
19 August 2026, 09:00 UTC+2

Croatia
0

		Result
		(Ukraine) 1–0 (Croatia)
1	Raiia Almalalha; Kseniia Rozhkovan	11 – 9 (11–9)	Ana Pranić; Maja Pranić
2	Marko Bekesevych; Maksym Kushka	22 – 20 (11–11)	Tin Radovanović; Marko Šurina
3	Vladyslav Kunin; Varvara Poperezhai	30 – 33 (8–13)	Vito Radovanović; Ana Pranić
4	Ivan Dzhus	41 – 44 (11–11)	Vito Radovanović
5	Raiia Almalalha	55 – 49 (14–5)	Maja Pranić
		(Ukraine) 2–0 (Croatia)
6	Mariia Aleksandrova; Raiia Almalalha	11 – 0 (11–0)	Maja Pranić; Tea Rebesco
7	Ihor Belinskyi; Roman Karatanov	22 – 8 (11–8)	Tin Radovanović; Marko Šurina
8	Vladyslav Kunin; Varvara Poperezhai	33 – 17 (11–9)	Vito Radovanović; Ana Pranić
9	Vladyslav Kunin	44 – 19 (11–2)	Vid Borota
10	Varvara Poperezhai	55 – 26 (11–7)	Ana Pranić
Tie won by Ukraine
11	Raiia Almalalha; Sofiia Bielobrovchuk	– Not played	Ana Pranić; Maja Pranić
12	Ihor Belinskyi; Roman Karatanov	– Not played	Tin Radovanović; Marko Šurina
13	Vladyslav Kunin; Varvara Poperezhai	– Not played	Vito Radovanović; Ana Pranić
14	Vladyslav Kunin	– Not played	Vito Radovanović
15	Raiia Almalalha	– Not played	Ana Pranić

==== Turkey vs Italy ====
Turkey
2
Tatabányai Multifunkcionális Csarnok, Court 3
19 August 2026, 09:00 UTC+2

Italy
0

		Result
		(Turkey) 1–0 (Italy)
1	Muhammed Hasim Turksoy; Nevra Mutlu	11 – 6 (11–6)	Davide Izzo; Anna Hell
2	Elifnur Demir; Zeynep Berre Ocakoğlu	22 – 10 (11–4)	Anna Hell; Margherita Tognetti
3	Mehmet Can Töremiş	33 – 16 (11–6)	Davide Izzo
4	Aleyna Korkut	44 – 25 (11–9)	Anna Hell
5	Gökay Göl; Mert Seven	55 – 33 (11–8)	Davide Izzo; Sebastian Tataru
		(Turkey) 2–0 (Italy)
6	Gökay Göl; Nisa Nur Çimen	11 – 6 (11–6)	Davide Izzo; Anna Hell
7	Aysu Arslan; Nisa Nur Çimen	22 – 13 (11–7)	Anna Hell; Margherita Tognetti
8	Furkan Bultan	33 – 21 (11–8)	Davide Izzo
9	Elifnur Demir	44 – 24 (11–3)	Lena Kobler
10	Gökay Göl; Mehmet Can Töremiş	55 – 32 (11–8)	Karl Ladurner; Sebastian Tataru
Tie won by Turkey
11	Gökay Göl; Nisa Nur Çimen	– Not played	Sebastian Tataru; Lena Kobler
12	Aysu Arslan; Nisa Nur Çimen	– Not played	Anna Hell; Margherita Tognetti
13	Mehmet Can Töremiş	– Not played	Davide Izzo
14	Elifnur Demir	– Not played	Anna Hell
15	Gökay Göl; Mert Seven	– Not played	Davide Izzo; Karl Ladurner

==== Turkey vs Ukraine ====
Turkey
2
Tatabányai Multifunkcionális Csarnok, Court 1
20 August 2026, 15:00 UTC+2

Ukraine
0

		Result
		(Turkey) 1–0 (Ukraine)
1	Gökay Göl; Mert Seven	11 – 7 (11–7)	Ivan Dzhus; Vladyslav Kunin
2	Elifnur Demir	22 – 17 (11–10)	Raiia Almalalha
3	Mehmet Can Töremiş	33 – 27 (11–10)	Vladyslav Kunin
4	Elifnur Demir; Zeynep Berre Ocakoğlu	44 – 33 (11–6)	Raiia Almalalha; Varvara Poperezhai
5	Gökay Göl; Nisa Nur Çimen	55 – 42 (11–9)	Vladyslav Kunin; Raiia Almalalha
		(Turkey) 2–0 (Ukraine)
6	Gökay Göl; Mehmet Can Töremiş	11 – 5 (11–5)	Roman Karatanov; Vladyslav Kunin
7	Elifnur Demir	22 – 14 (11–9)	Raiia Almalalha
8	Mehmet Can Töremiş	33 – 23 (11–9)	Vladyslav Kunin
9	Elifnur Demir; Zeynep Berre Ocakoğlu	44 – 27 (11–4)	Varvara Poperezhai; Kseniia Rozhkovan
10	Gökay Göl; Nisa Nur Çimen	55 – 32 (11–5)	Vladyslav Kunin; Raiia Almalalha
Tie won by Turkey
11	Gökay Göl; Mehmet Can Töremiş	– Not played	Ivan Dzhus; Vladyslav Kunin
12	Aleyna Korkut	– Not played	Raiia Almalalha
13	Mehmet Can Töremiş	– Not played	Vladyslav Kunin
14	Aysu Arslan; Nisa Nur Çimen	– Not played	Raiia Almalalha; Varvara Poperezhai
15	Gökay Göl; Nisa Nur Çimen	– Not played	Vladyslav Kunin; Raiia Almalalha

==== Italy vs Croatia ====
Italy
2
Tatabányai Multifunkcionális Csarnok, Court 3
20 August 2026, 15:00 UTC+2

Croatia
0

		Result
		(Italy) 1–0 (Croatia)
1	Anna Hell	6 – 11 (6–11)	Ana Pranić
2	Davide Izzo; Sebastian Tataru	13 – 22 (7–11)	Tin Radovanović; Marko Šurina
3	Davide Izzo	27 – 33 (14–11)	Vito Radovanović
4	Davide Izzo; Anna Hell	39 – 44 (12–11)	Vito Radovanović; Ana Pranić
5	Anna Hell; Margherita Tognetti	55 – 53 (16–9)	Ana Pranić; Maja Pranić
		(Italy) 2–0 (Croatia)
6	Anna Hell	8 – 11 (8–11)	Ana Pranić
7	Davide Izzo; Karl Ladurner	20 – 22 (12–11)	Vid Borota; Marko Šurina
8	Davide Izzo	31 – 33 (11–11)	Vito Radovanović
9	Davide Izzo; Anna Hell	44 – 39 (13–6)	Marko Šurina; Maja Pranić
10	Anna Hell; Margherita Tognetti	55 – 50 (11–11)	Ana Pranić; Maja Pranić
Tie won by Italy
11	Anna Hell	– Not played	Ana Pranić
12	Davide Izzo; Sebastian Tataru	– Not played	Tin Radovanović; Marko Šurina
13	Davide Izzo	– Not played	Vito Radovanović
14	Davide Izzo; Anna Hell	– Not played	Vito Radovanović; Ana Pranić
15	Anna Hell; Margherita Tognetti	– Not played	Ana Pranić; Maja Pranić

=== Group C2 ===
Pos	Team	Pld	W	L	MF	MA	MD	GF	GA	GD	PF	PA	PD	Pts	Qualification	England	Belgium	Romania	Norway
1	England	3	3	0	6	0	+6	26	4	+22	330	225	+105	3	Advance to knockout stage	—	2–0	2–0	2–0
2	Belgium	3	2	1	4	2	+2	23	7	+16	305	249	+56	2			—	2–0	2–0
3	Romania	3	1	2	2	4	−2	8	22	−14	279	294	−15	1				—	2–0
4	Norway	3	0	3	0	6	−6	3	27	−24	184	330	−146	0					—

Source: BWF

==== Romania vs Belgium ====
Romania
0
Tatabányai Multifunkcionális Csarnok, Court 3
18 August 2026, 12:00 UTC+2

Belgium
2

		Result
		(Romania) 0–1 (Belgium)
1	Daria-Irina Gherasim; Cristina Maria Sirbu	1 – 11 (1–11)	Fae Boonen; Lieke van Parys
2	George Alexandru Mocan	7 – 22 (6–11)	Seppe Daemers
3	Daria-Irina Gherasim	27 – 33 (20–11)	Lea Dauphinais
4	Călin Grăjdieru; Maxim Iacob	37 – 44 (10–11)	Loïc Gosset; Julien Verheyen
5	George Alexandru Mocan; Cristina Maria Sirbu	47 – 55 (10–11)	Seppe Daemers; Lieke van Parys
		(Romania) 0–2 (Belgium)
6	Daria-Irina Gherasim; Cristina Maria Sirbu	6 – 11 (6–11)	Fae Boonen; Lieke van Parys
7	Maxim Iacob	11 – 22 (5–11)	Loïc Gosset
8	Daria-Irina Gherasim	23 – 33 (12–11)	Auriane Vasilevski
9	Călin Grăjdieru; Maxim Iacob	35 – 44 (12–11)	Seppe Daemers; Rik de Backer
10	George Alexandru Mocan; Cristina Maria Sirbu	43 – 55 (8–11)	Seppe Daemers; Lieke van Parys
Tie won by Belgium
11	Daria-Irina Gherasim; Cristina Maria Sirbu	– Not played	Fae Boonen; Lieke van Parys
12	George Alexandru Mocan	– Not played	Loïc Gosset
13	Daria-Irina Gherasim	– Not played	Lea Dauphinais
14	Călin Grăjdieru; Maxim Iacob	– Not played	Loïc Gosset; Julien Verheyen
15	George Alexandru Mocan; Cristina Maria Sirbu	– Not played	Seppe Daemers; Lieke van Parys

==== England vs Norway ====
England
2
Tatabányai Multifunkcionális Csarnok, Court 1
18 August 2026, 12:00 UTC+2

Norway
0

		Result
		(England) 1–0 (Norway)
1	Kalyan Manoj	11 – 7 (11–7)	Deeptanshu Toka
2	George Clare; Jaxon Clarke	22 – 9 (11–2)	Simon Frisnes; Deeptanshu Toka
3	Rajvi Parab	33 – 15 (11–6)	Sennova Lindland
4	James Song; Shraddha Gopalakrishnan	44 – 17 (11–2)	William Barø; Oline Langeland Risa
5	Anna Stewart; Tin Wing Wan	55 – 23 (11–6)	Maria Ellingsen; Oline Langeland Risa
		(England) 2–0 (Norway)
6	Kalyan Manoj	11 – 10 (11–10)	Deeptanshu Toka
7	George Clare; Jaxon Clarke	22 – 11 (11–1)	Simon Frisnes; Deeptanshu Toka
8	Rajvi Parab	33 – 17 (11–6)	Sennova Lindland
9	James Song; Shraddha Gopalakrishnan	44 – 22 (11–5)	William Barø; Oline Langeland Risa
10	Anna Stewart; Tin Wing Wan	55 – 38 (11–16)	Maria Ellingsen; Oline Langeland Risa
Tie won by England
11	Kalyan Manoj	– Not played	Deeptanshu Toka
12	George Clare; James Song	– Not played	Simon Frisnes; Deeptanshu Toka
13	Rajvi Parab	– Not played	Sennova Lindland
14	James Song; Shraddha Gopalakrishnan	– Not played	William Barø; Oline Langeland Risa
15	Mia Fox; Tin Wing Wan	– Not played	Maria Ellingsen; Oline Langeland Risa

==== England vs Romania ====
England
2
Tatabányai Multifunkcionális Csarnok, Court 2
19 August 2026, 09:00 UTC+2

Romania
0

		Result
		(England) 1–0 (Romania)
1	Aahna Bhatia	11 – 6 (11–6)	Daria-Irina Gherasim
2	Anish Nair	22 – 17 (11–11)	Călin Grăjdieru
3	Mia Fox; Rajvi Parab	33 – 26 (11–9)	Daria-Irina Gherasim; Cristina Maria Sirbu
4	George Clare; Yixiang Hou	44 – 30 (11–4)	Călin Grăjdieru; Maxim Iacob
5	James Song; Shraddha Gopalakrishnan	55 – 37 (11–7)	George Alexandru Mocan; Cristina Maria Sirbu
		(England) 2–0 (Romania)
6	Aahna Bhatia	10 – 11 (10–11)	Daria-Irina Gherasim
7	Anish Nair	22 – 18 (12–7)	Maxim Iacob
8	Mia Fox; Rajvi Parab	33 – 26 (11–8)	Daria-Irina Gherasim; Cristina Maria Sirbu
9	Jaxon Clarke; Yixiang Hou	44 – 38 (11–12)	Călin Grăjdieru; Maxim Iacob
10	George Clare; Anna Stewart	55 – 42 (11–4)	George Alexandru Mocan; Cristina Maria Sirbu
Tie won by England
11	Aahna Bhatia	– Not played	Daria-Irina Gherasim
12	Anish Nair	– Not played	Maxim Iacob
13	Mia Fox; Rajvi Parab	– Not played	Daria-Irina Gherasim; Cristina Maria Sirbu
14	George Clare; James Song	– Not played	Călin Grăjdieru; Maxim Iacob
15	James Song; Shraddha Gopalakrishnan	– Not played	George Alexandru Mocan; Cristina Maria Sirbu

==== Belgium vs Norway ====
Belgium
2
Tatabányai Multifunkcionális Csarnok, Court 4
19 August 2026, 09:00 UTC+2

Norway
0

		Result
		(Belgium) 1–0 (Norway)
1	Loïc Gosset	11 – 2 (11–2)	Deeptanshu Toka
2	Lea Dauphinais	22 – 6 (11–4)	Sennova Lindland
3	Seppe Daemers; Rik de Backer	33 – 13 (11–7)	David Nguyen; William Barø
4	Fae Boonen; Lieke van Parys	44 – 18 (11–5)	Maria Ellingsen; Oline Langeland Risa
5	Loïc Gosset; Auriane Vasilevski	55 – 28 (11–10)	David Nguyen; Varshini Manikandan
		(Belgium) 2–0 (Norway)
6	Loïc Gosset	11 – 1 (11–1)	Deeptanshu Toka
7	Auriane Vasilevski	22 – 7 (11–6)	Sennova Lindland
8	Rik de Backer; Julien Verheyen	33 – 11 (11–4)	David Nguyen; William Barø
9	Fae Boonen; Lieke van Parys	44 – 14 (11–3)	Maria Ellingsen; Oline Langeland Risa
10	Seppe Daemers; Lieke van Parys	55 – 21 (11–7)	David Nguyen; Varshini Manikandan
Tie won by Belgium
11	Seppe Daemers	– Not played	Deeptanshu Toka
12	Lea Dauphinais	– Not played	Sennova Lindland
13	Loïc Gosset; Julien Verheyen	– Not played	David Nguyen; William Barø
14	Fae Boonen; Lieke van Parys	– Not played	Maria Ellingsen; Oline Langeland Risa
15	Seppe Daemers; Lieke van Parys	– Not played	David Nguyen; Varshini Manikandan

==== Romania vs Norway ====
Romania
2
Tatabányai Multifunkcionális Csarnok, Court 2
20 August 2026, 15:00 UTC+2

Norway
0

		Result
		(Romania) 1–0 (Norway)
1	George Alexandru Mocan	10 – 11 (10–11)	Simon Frisnes
2	Călin Grăjdieru; Maxim Iacob	19 – 22 (9–11)	David Nguyen; William Barø
3	Elena Andreea Costache	33 – 27 (14–5)	Sennova Lindland
4	Daria-Irina Gherasim; Sorina Teodora Juganaru	44 – 34 (11–7)	Maria Ellingsen; Oline Langeland Risa
5	George Alexandru Mocan; Cristina Maria Sirbu	55 – 40 (11–6)	David Nguyen; Varshini Manikandan
		(Romania) 2–0 (Norway)
6	Călin Grăjdieru	8 – 11 (8–11)	Simon Frisnes
7	Călin Grăjdieru; Maxim Iacob	22 – 15 (14–4)	David Nguyen; William Barø
8	Elena Andreea Costache	33 – 20 (11–5)	Sennova Lindland
9	Daria-Irina Gherasim; Sorina Teodora Juganaru	44 – 28 (11–8)	Maria Ellingsen; Oline Langeland Risa
10	George Alexandru Mocan; Cristina Maria Sirbu	55 – 34 (11–6)	David Nguyen; Varshini Manikandan
Tie won by Romania
11	Călin Grăjdieru	– Not played	Simon Frisnes
12	Călin Grăjdieru; Maxim Iacob	– Not played	David Nguyen; William Barø
13	Daria-Irina Gherasim	– Not played	Sennova Lindland
14	Daria-Irina Gherasim; Cristina Maria Sirbu	– Not played	Maria Ellingsen; Oline Langeland Risa
15	George Alexandru Mocan; Cristina Maria Sirbu	– Not played	David Nguyen; Varshini Manikandan

==== England vs Belgium ====
England
2
Tatabányai Multifunkcionális Csarnok, Court 4
20 August 2026, 15:00 UTC+2

Belgium
0

		Result
		(England) 1–0 (Belgium)
1	Mia Fox; Rajvi Parab	6 – 11 (6–11)	Fae Boonen; Lieke van Parys
2	George Clare; Yixiang Hou	22 – 18 (16–7)	Seppe Daemers; Rik de Backer
3	Rajvi Parab	33 – 25 (11–7)	Lea Dauphinais
4	Anish Nair	44 – 29 (11–4)	Loïc Gosset
5	George Clare; Anna Stewart	55 – 45 (11–16)	Seppe Daemers; Lieke van Parys
		(England) 2–0 (Belgium)
6	Mia Fox; Rajvi Parab	8 – 11 (8–11)	Fae Boonen; Lieke van Parys
7	George Clare; James Song	19 – 22 (11–11)	Seppe Daemers; Julien Verheyen
8	Rajvi Parab	33 – 25 (14–3)	Lea Dauphinais
9	Anish Nair	44 – 29 (11–4)	Seppe Daemers
10	James Song; Anna Stewart	55 – 40 (11–11)	Seppe Daemers; Lieke van Parys
Tie won by England
11	Mia Fox; Rajvi Parab	– Not played	Fae Boonen; Lieke van Parys
12	George Clare; Yixiang Hou	– Not played	Rik de Backer; Julien Verheyen
13	Rajvi Parab	– Not played	Lea Dauphinais
14	Anish Nair	– Not played	Loïc Gosset
15	George Clare; Anna Stewart	– Not played	Seppe Daemers; Lieke van Parys

=== Group D1 ===
Pos	Team	Pld	W	L	MF	MA	MD	GF	GA	GD	PF	PA	PD	Pts	Qualification	Denmark	Slovenia	Latvia
1	Denmark	2	2	0	4	0	+4	20	0	+20	220	117	+103	2	Advance to knockout stage	—	2–0	2–0
2	Slovenia	2	1	1	2	2	0	10	10	0	181	192	−11	1			—	2–0
3	Latvia	2	0	2	0	4	−4	0	20	−20	128	220	−92	0				—

Source: BWF

==== Latvia vs Denmark ====
Latvia
0
Tatabányai Multifunkcionális Csarnok, Court 5
18 August 2026, 12:00 UTC+2

Denmark
2

		Result
		(Latvia) 0–1 (Denmark)
1	Regnars Bajārs; Madara Gaure	5 – 11 (5–11)	Mikkel Eilersen Bouet; Anna Louise Winther
2	Madara Gaure	8 – 22 (3–11)	Ida Nissen
3	Regnars Bajārs	15 – 33 (7–11)	Christopher Kunckel
4	Evelīna Freija; Māra Nevedomska	22 – 44 (7–11)	Filippa Pedersen; Athene Lyduch Thornild
5	Regnars Bajārs; Renārs Kārkliņš	25 – 55 (3–11)	Sebastian Mønster Andersen; Birk Norman
		(Latvia) 0–2 (Denmark)
6	Regnars Bajārs; Madara Gaure	6 – 11 (6–11)	Birk Norman; Julie Søgaard
7	Madara Gaure	7 – 22 (1–11)	Diya Mary Cherian
8	Regnars Bajārs	11 – 33 (4–11)	Frederik Hinding
9	Evelīna Freija; Madara Gaure	15 – 44 (4–11)	Julie Søgaard; Anna Louise Winther
10	Oskars Bajārs; Regnars Bajārs	21 – 55 (6–11)	Mikkel Eilersen Bouet; Maximilian Ørding Kauffmann
Tie won by Denmark
11	Regnars Bajārs; Madara Gaure	– Not played	Sebastian Mønster Andersen; Filippa Pedersen
12	Madara Gaure	– Not played	Athene Lyduch Thornild
13	Regnars Bajārs	– Not played	Maximilian Ørding Kauffmann
14	Evelīna Freija; Madara Gaure	– Not played	Julie Søgaard; Anna Louise Winther
15	Oskars Bajārs; Regnars Bajārs	– Not played	Mikkel Eilersen Bouet; Birk Norman

==== Slovenia vs Latvia ====
Slovenia
2
Tatabányai Multifunkcionális Csarnok, Court 5
19 August 2026, 09:00 UTC+2

Latvia
0

		Result
		(Slovenia) 1–0 (Latvia)
1	Nikita Peshekhonov; Tija Horvat	11 – 3 (11–3)	Regnars Bajārs; Madara Gaure
2	Nikita Peshekhonov	22 – 9 (11–6)	Regnars Bajārs
3	Tinkara Alič	33 – 23 (11–14)	Madara Gaure
4	Matic Cerar; Maks Ian Mattias	44 – 40 (11–17)	Oskars Bajārs; Regnars Bajārs
5	Tinkara Alič; Tija Horvat	55 – 43 (11–3)	Evelīna Freija; Madara Gaure
		(Slovenia) 2–0 (Latvia)
6	Nikita Peshekhonov; Tija Horvat	11 – 6 (11–6)	Regnars Bajārs; Madara Gaure
7	Nikita Peshekhonov	22 – 14 (11–8)	Regnars Bajārs
8	Tinkara Alič	33 – 17 (11–3)	Madara Gaure
9	Matic Cerar; Maks Ian Mattias	44 – 31 (11–14)	Oskars Bajārs; Regnars Bajārs
10	Tinkara Alič; Tija Horvat	55 – 39 (11–8)	Evelīna Freija; Madara Gaure
Tie won by Slovenia
11	Nikita Peshekhonov; Tija Horvat	– Not played	Regnars Bajārs; Madara Gaure
12	Nikita Peshekhonov	– Not played	Regnars Bajārs
13	Tinkara Alič	– Not played	Madara Gaure
14	Matic Cerar; Maks Ian Mattias	– Not played	Oskars Bajārs; Regnars Bajārs
15	Tinkara Alič; Tija Horvat	– Not played	Evelīna Freija; Madara Gaure

==== Slovenia vs Denmark ====
Slovenia
0
Tatabányai Multifunkcionális Csarnok, Court 1
20 August 2026, 12:00 UTC+2

Denmark
2

		Result
		(Slovenia) 0–1 (Denmark)
1	Matic Cerar; Maks Ian Mattias	5 – 11 (5–11)	Mikkel Eilersen Bouet; Maximilian Ørding Kauffmann
2	Tija Horvat	12 – 22 (7–11)	Athene Lyduch Thornild
3	Nikita Peshekhonov; Tija Horvat	18 – 33 (6–11)	Mikkel Eilersen Bouet; Anna Louise Winther
4	Tinkara Alič; Tija Horvat	27 – 44 (9–11)	Julie Søgaard; Anna Louise Winther
5	Nikita Peshekhonov	32 – 55 (5–11)	Christopher Kunckel
		(Slovenia) 0–2 (Denmark)
6	Matic Cerar; Jurij Vodan Jecelj	7 – 11 (7–11)	Sebastian Mønster Andersen; Birk Norman
7	Tija Horvat	19 – 22 (12–11)	Diya Mary Cherian
8	Nikita Peshekhonov; Tija Horvat	29 – 33 (10–11)	Birk Norman; Julie Søgaard
9	Tinkara Alič; Tija Horvat	35 – 44 (6–11)	Filippa Pedersen; Athene Lyduch Thornild
10	Nikita Peshekhonov	39 – 55 (4–11)	Maximilian Ørding Kauffmann
Tie won by Denmark
11	Matic Cerar; Maks Ian Mattias	– Not played	Sebastian Mønster Andersen; Birk Norman
12	Tija Horvat	– Not played	Ida Nissen
13	Nikita Peshekhonov; Tija Horvat	– Not played	Sebastian Mønster Andersen; Filippa Pedersen
14	Tinkara Alič; Tija Horvat	– Not played	Julie Søgaard; Anna Louise Winther
15	Nikita Peshekhonov	– Not played	Frederik Hinding

=== Group D2 ===
Pos	Team	Pld	W	L	MF	MA	MD	GF	GA	GD	PF	PA	PD	Pts	Qualification	Spain	Switzerland	Hungary	Iceland
1	Spain	3	3	0	6	1	+5	30	5	+25	378	281	+97	3	Advance to knockout stage	—	2–1	2–0	2–0
2	Switzerland	3	2	1	5	3	+2	29	11	+18	409	321	+88	2			—	2–1	2–0
3	Hungary	3	1	2	3	4	−1	8	27	−19	309	347	−38	1				—	2–0
4	Iceland	3	0	3	0	6	−6	3	27	−24	183	330	−147	0					—

Source: BWF

==== Hungary vs Switzerland ====
Hungary
1
Tatabányai Multifunkcionális Csarnok, Court 2
18 August 2026, 15:00 UTC+2

Switzerland
2

		Result
		(Hungary) 0–1 (Switzerland)
1	Eliza Liang	1 – 11 (1–11)	Sanna Germann
2	Zénó Ágai; Péter Palkovics	9 – 22 (8–11)	Santiago Araújo; Leo Crelier
3	Péter Palkovics; Etelka Karalyos	16 – 33 (7–11)	Santiago Araújo; Victoria Dübendorfer
4	Etelka Karalyos; Anna Pinke	23 – 44 (7–11)	Victoria Dübendorfer; Sofia Uvarova
5	Péter Palkovics	29 – 55 (6–11)	Santiago Araújo
		(Hungary) 1–1 (Switzerland)
6	Anna Pinke	3 – 11 (3–11)	Sanna Germann
7	Zénó Ágai; Péter Palkovics	16 – 22 (13–11)	Santiago Araújo; Leo Crelier
8	Balázs Pető; Anna Pinke	29 – 33 (13–11)	Santiago Araújo; Victoria Dübendorfer
9	Etelka Karalyos; Anna Pinke	38 – 44 (9–11)	Victoria Dübendorfer; Sofia Uvarova
10	Péter Palkovics	55 – 49 (17–5)	Santiago Araújo
		(Hungary) 1–2 (Switzerland)
11	Anna Pinke	5 – 11 (5–11)	Sanna Germann
12	Zénó Ágai; Péter Palkovics	15 – 22 (10–11)	Santiago Araújo; Leo Crelier
13	Balázs Pető; Anna Pinke	23 – 33 (8–11)	Santiago Araújo; Victoria Dübendorfer
14	Etelka Karalyos; Anna Pinke	33 – 44 (10–11)	Victoria Dübendorfer; Sofia Uvarova
15	Péter Palkovics	42 – 55 (9–11)	Santiago Araújo
Tie won by Switzerland

==== Spain vs Iceland ====
Spain
2
Tatabányai Multifunkcionális Csarnok, Court 4
18 August 2026, 15:00 UTC+2

Iceland
0

		Result
		(Spain) 1–0 (Iceland)
1	Sofía García	11 – 4 (11–4)	Iðunn Jakobsdóttir
2	Mario Rodríguez; Noelia López	22 – 12 (11–8)	Rúnar Gauti Kristjánsson; Katla Sól Arnarsdóttir
3	Sara del Castillo; Inés Poncela	33 – 20 (11–8)	Emma Katrin Helgadóttir; Iðunn Jakobsdóttir
4	Xoel Álvarez; Adrián Rodríguez	44 – 30 (11–10)	Eggert Þór Eggertsson; Óðinn Magnússon
5	Raúl Bergua	55 – 35 (11–5)	Eggert Þór Eggertsson
		(Spain) 2–0 (Iceland)
6	Sara del Castillo	11 – 8 (11–8)	Iðunn Jakobsdóttir
7	Yaidel Gil; Sofía García	22 – 11 (11–3)	Rúnar Gauti Kristjánsson; Katla Sól Arnarsdóttir
8	Iziar Barcala; Sofía García	33 – 17 (11–6)	Katla Sól Arnarsdóttir; Emma Katrin Helgadóttir
9	Xoel Álvarez; Adrián Rodríguez	44 – 25 (11–8)	Rúnar Gauti Kristjánsson; Óðinn Magnússon
10	Mario Rodríguez	55 – 33 (11–8)	Eggert Þór Eggertsson
Tie won by Spain
11	Sofía García	– Not played	Iðunn Jakobsdóttir
12	Mario Rodríguez; Noelia López	– Not played	Rúnar Gauti Kristjánsson; Katla Sól Arnarsdóttir
13	Sara del Castillo; Inés Poncela	– Not played	Emma Katrin Helgadóttir; Iðunn Jakobsdóttir
14	Xoel Álvarez; Adrián Rodríguez	– Not played	Eggert Þór Eggertsson; Óðinn Magnússon
15	Raúl Bergua	– Not played	Eggert Þór Eggertsson

==== Spain vs Hungary ====
Spain
2
Tatabányai Multifunkcionális Csarnok, Court 1
19 August 2026, 12:00 UTC+2

Hungary
0

		Result
		(Spain) 1–0 (Hungary)
1	Yaidel Gil	11 – 6 (11–6)	Péter Palkovics
2	Sara del Castillo	22 – 11 (11–5)	Anna Pinke
3	Yaidel Gil; Mario Rodríguez	33 – 18 (11–7)	Zénó Ágai; Balázs Pető
4	Iziar Barcala; Sofía García	44 – 22 (11–4)	Etelka Karalyos; Anna Pinke
5	Yaidel Gil; Sofía García	55 – 32 (11–10)	Péter Palkovics; Etelka Karalyos
		(Spain) 2–0 (Hungary)
6	Yaidel Gil	11 – 7 (11–7)	Zénó Ágai
7	Iziar Barcala	22 – 13 (11–6)	Eliza Liang
8	Xoel Álvarez; Adrián Rodríguez	33 – 23 (11–10)	Zénó Ágai; Péter Palkovics
9	Sara del Castillo; Inés Poncela	44 – 30 (11–7)	Etelka Karalyos; Anna Pinke
10	Mario Rodríguez; Noelia López	55 – 41 (11–11)	Balázs Pető; Anna Pinke
Tie won by Spain
11	Mario Rodríguez	– Not played	Péter Palkovics
12	Sara del Castillo	– Not played	Anna Pinke
13	Yaidel Gil; Mario Rodríguez	– Not played	Zénó Ágai; Balázs Pető
14	Iziar Barcala; Sofía García	– Not played	Etelka Karalyos; Anna Pinke
15	Mario Rodríguez; Noelia López	– Not played	Péter Palkovics; Etelka Karalyos

==== Switzerland vs Iceland ====
Switzerland
2
Tatabányai Multifunkcionális Csarnok, Court 3
19 August 2026, 12:00 UTC+2

Iceland
0

		Result
		(Switzerland) 1–0 (Iceland)
1	Sanna Germann	11 – 2 (11–2)	Iðunn Jakobsdóttir
2	Nicolas Briancourt; Leo Crelier	22 – 3 (11–1)	Eggert Þór Eggertsson; Rúnar Gauti Kristjánsson
3	Nicolas Briancourt; Victoria Dübendorfer	33 – 6 (11–3)	Óðinn Magnússon; Emma Katrin Helgadóttir
4	Victoria Dübendorfer; Nishka Sharma	44 – 10 (11–4)	Katla Sól Arnarsdóttir; Emma Katrin Helgadóttir
5	Santiago Araújo	55 – 14 (11–4)	Óðinn Magnússon
		(Switzerland) 2–0 (Iceland)
6	Nishka Sharma	11 – 5 (11–5)	Iðunn Jakobsdóttir
7	Nicolas Briancourt; Nathan Nguyen	22 – 12 (11–7)	Eggert Þór Eggertsson; Óðinn Magnússon
8	Santiago Araújo; Ainara Putri	33 – 17 (11–5)	Rúnar Gauti Kristjánsson; Emma Katrin Helgadóttir
9	Victoria Dübendorfer; Sofia Uvarova	44 – 22 (11–5)	Katla Sól Arnarsdóttir; Iðunn Jakobsdóttir
10	Santiago Araújo	55 – 23 (11–1)	Óðinn Magnússon
Tie won by Switzerland
11	Sanna Germann	– Not played	Iðunn Jakobsdóttir
12	Santiago Araújo; Leo Crelier	– Not played	Eggert Þór Eggertsson; Óðinn Magnússon
13	Santiago Araújo; Victoria Dübendorfer	– Not played	Rúnar Gauti Kristjánsson; Emma Katrin Helgadóttir
14	Victoria Dübendorfer; Sofia Uvarova	– Not played	Katla Sól Arnarsdóttir; Iðunn Jakobsdóttir
15	Santiago Araújo	– Not played	Eggert Þór Eggertsson

==== Hungary vs Iceland ====
Hungary
2
Tatabányai Multifunkcionális Csarnok, Court 2
20 August 2026, 09:00 UTC+2

Iceland
0

		Result
		(Hungary) 1–0 (Iceland)
1	Balázs Pető; Anna Pinke	9 – 11 (9–11)	Óðinn Magnússon; Iðunn Jakobsdóttir
2	Zénó Ágai	18 – 22 (9–11)	Eggert Þór Eggertsson
3	Elza Sándor	31 – 33 (13–11)	Iðunn Jakobsdóttir
4	Eliza Liang; Elza Sándor	44 – 38 (13–5)	Katla Sól Arnarsdóttir; Emma Katrin Helgadóttir
5	Zsombor Erdős; Péter Palkovics	55 – 41 (11–3)	Eggert Þór Eggertsson; Rúnar Gauti Kristjánsson
		(Hungary) 2–0 (Iceland)
6	Péter Palkovics; Etelka Karalyos	11 – 4 (11–4)	Rúnar Gauti Kristjánsson; Katla Sól Arnarsdóttir
7	Péter Palkovics	22 – 7 (11–3)	Óðinn Magnússon
8	Eliza Liang	33 – 13 (11–6)	Iðunn Jakobsdóttir
9	Etelka Karalyos; Anna Pinke	44 – 23 (11–10)	Katla Sól Arnarsdóttir; Emma Katrin Helgadóttir
10	Zénó Ágai; Balázs Pető	55 – 37 (11–14)	Eggert Þór Eggertsson; Óðinn Magnússon
Tie won by Hungary
11	Péter Palkovics; Etelka Karalyos	– Not played	Rúnar Gauti Kristjánsson; Emma Katrin Helgadóttir
12	Zénó Ágai	– Not played	Eggert Þór Eggertsson
13	Eliza Liang	– Not played	Iðunn Jakobsdóttir
14	Etelka Karalyos; Anna Pinke	– Not played	Katla Sól Arnarsdóttir; Emma Katrin Helgadóttir
15	Zénó Ágai; Balázs Pető	– Not played	Eggert Þór Eggertsson; Óðinn Magnússon

==== Spain vs Switzerland ====
Spain
2
Tatabányai Multifunkcionális Csarnok, Court 4
20 August 2026, 09:00 UTC+2

Switzerland
1

		Result
		(Spain) 1–0 (Switzerland)
1	Yaidel Gil; Mario Rodríguez	11 – 7 (11–7)	Nicolas Briancourt; Leo Crelier
2	Sara del Castillo	22 – 11 (11–4)	Sanna Germann
3	Yaidel Gil	33 – 20 (11–9)	Santiago Araújo
4	Iziar Barcala; Sofía García	44 – 27 (11–7)	Victoria Dübendorfer; Sofia Uvarova
5	Yaidel Gil; Sofía García	55 – 37 (11–10)	Santiago Araújo; Victoria Dübendorfer
		(Spain) 1–1 (Switzerland)
6	Xoel Álvarez; Adrián Rodríguez	11 – 10 (11–10)	Nicolas Briancourt; Leo Crelier
7	Iziar Barcala	16 – 22 (5–12)	Sanna Germann
8	Mario Rodríguez	24 – 33 (8–11)	Santiago Araújo
9	Sara del Castillo; Inés Poncela	31 – 44 (7–11)	Victoria Dübendorfer; Sofia Uvarova
10	Mario Rodríguez; Noelia López	48 – 55 (17–11)	Santiago Araújo; Victoria Dübendorfer
		(Spain) 2–1 (Switzerland)
11	Yaidel Gil; Mario Rodríguez	11 – 8 (11–8)	Nicolas Briancourt; Leo Crelier
12	Sara del Castillo	16 – 22 (5–14)	Sanna Germann
13	Yaidel Gil	33 – 30 (17–8)	Santiago Araújo
14	Sara del Castillo; Inés Poncela	44 – 39 (11–9)	Victoria Dübendorfer; Sofia Uvarova
15	Mario Rodríguez; Noelia López	55 – 48 (11–9)	Santiago Araújo; Victoria Dübendorfer
Tie won by Spain

== Classification round ==
=== 9th to 16th place ===
==== Belgium vs Slovenia ====
Belgium
2
Tatabányai Multifunkcionális Csarnok, Court 1
21 August 2026, 12:00 UTC+2

Slovenia
1

		Result
		(Belgium) 1–0 (Slovenia)
1	Fae Boonen; Lieke van Parys	11 – 8 (11–8)	Tinkara Alič; Tija Horvat
2	Auriane Vasilevski	22 – 15 (11–7)	Tija Horvat
3	Seppe Daemers; Lieke van Parys	33 – 23 (11–8)	Nikita Peshekhonov; Tija Horvat
4	Loïc Gosset	44 – 33 (11–10)	Nikita Peshekhonov
5	Seppe Daemers; Rik de Backer	55 – 41 (11–8)	Matic Cerar; Maks Ian Mattias
		(Belgium) 1–1 (Slovenia)
6	Fae Boonen; Lieke van Parys	11 – 10 (11–10)	Tinkara Alič; Tija Horvat
7	Lea Dauphinais	22 – 20 (11–10)	Tinkara Alič
8	Loïc Gosset; Auriane Vasilevski	32 – 33 (10–13)	Matic Cerar; Tinkara Alič
9	Seppe Daemers	37 – 44 (5–11)	Matic Cerar
10	Loïc Gosset; Julien Verheyen	53 – 55 (16–11)	Nikita Peshekhonov; Jurij Vodan Jecelj
		(Belgium) 2–1 (Slovenia)
11	Fae Boonen; Lieke van Parys	11 – 3 (11–3)	Tinkara Alič; Tija Horvat
12	Lea Dauphinais	22 – 7 (11–4)	Tinkara Alič
13	Seppe Daemers; Lieke van Parys	33 – 14 (11–7)	Nikita Peshekhonov; Tija Horvat
14	Loïc Gosset	44 – 19 (11–5)	Matic Cerar
15	Seppe Daemers; Julien Verheyen	55 – 35 (11–16)	Matic Cerar; Nikita Peshekhonov
Tie won by Belgium

==== Ukraine vs Switzerland ====
Ukraine
1
Tatabányai Multifunkcionális Csarnok, Court 2
21 August 2026, 12:00 UTC+2

Switzerland
2

		Result
		(Ukraine) 0–1 (Switzerland)
1	Ihor Belinskyi; Roman Karatanov	4 – 11 (4–11)	Santiago Araújo; Nicolas Briancourt
2	Vladyslav Kunin; Raiia Almalalha	11 – 22 (7–11)	Nicolas Briancourt; Victoria Dübendorfer
3	Vladyslav Kunin	19 – 33 (8–11)	Santiago Araújo
4	Raiia Almalalha; Sofiia Bielobrovchuk	29 – 44 (10–11)	Victoria Dübendorfer; Sofia Uvarova
5	Varvara Poperezhai	34 – 55 (5–11)	Sanna Germann
		(Ukraine) 1–1 (Switzerland)
6	Ivan Dzhus; Vladyslav Kunin	7 – 11 (7–11)	Santiago Araújo; Nicolas Briancourt
7	Vladyslav Kunin; Varvara Poperezhai	22 – 20 (15–9)	Nicolas Briancourt; Victoria Dübendorfer
8	Ivan Dzhus	29 – 33 (7–13)	Santiago Araújo
9	Varvara Poperezhai; Kseniia Rozhkovan	44 – 42 (15–9)	Victoria Dübendorfer; Nishka Sharma
10	Raiia Almalalha	55 – 48 (11–6)	Sanna Germann
		(Ukraine) 1–2 (Switzerland)
11	Ihor Belinskyi; Roman Karatanov	8 – 11 (8–11)	Santiago Araújo; Nicolas Briancourt
12	Vladyslav Kunin; Varvara Poperezhai	22 – 19 (14–8)	Nicolas Briancourt; Victoria Dübendorfer
13	Vladyslav Kunin	33 – 28 (11–9)	Santiago Araújo
14	Varvara Poperezhai; Kseniia Rozhkovan	40 – 44 (7–16)	Victoria Dübendorfer; Sofia Uvarova
15	Raiia Almalalha	49 – 55 (9–11)	Sanna Germann
Tie won by Switzerland

==== Sweden vs Czech Republic ====
Sweden
0
Tatabányai Multifunkcionális Csarnok, Court 3
21 August 2026, 12:00 UTC+2

Czech Republic
2

		Result
		(Sweden) 0–1 (Czech Republic)
1	Anvita Harakamani; Aiwei Sun	8 – 11 (8–11)	Erika Osičková; Adéla Turoňová
2	Xiaoyin Liang	22 – 21 (14–10)	Amélie Maixnerová
3	Josef Fang; Aiwei Sun	31 – 33 (9–12)	Filip Titěra; Amélie Maixnerová
4	Adam Medin; Josef Fang	40 – 44 (9–11)	Vojtěch Strejček; Lukáš Thor
5	Adam Medin	51 – 55 (11–11)	Lukáš Patzák
		(Sweden) 0–2 (Czech Republic)
6	Anvita Harakamani; Aiwei Sun	5 – 11 (5–11)	Amélie Maixnerová; Erika Osičková
7	Xiaoyin Liang	12 – 22 (7–11)	Amélie Maixnerová
8	Josef Fang; Aiwei Sun	20 – 33 (8–11)	Lukáš Patzák; Erika Osičková
9	Tobias Niemi Ström; Josef Fang	22 – 44 (2–11)	Kryštof Coufal; Filip Titěra
10	Adam Medin	37 – 55 (15–11)	Petr Bříza
Tie won by Czech Republic
11	Anvita Harakamani; Aiwei Sun	– Not played	Amélie Maixnerová; Erika Osičková
12	Xiaoyin Liang	– Not played	Amélie Maixnerová
13	Josef Fang; Aiwei Sun	– Not played	Lukáš Patzák; Erika Osičková
14	Adam Medin; Josef Fang	– Not played	Vojtěch Strejček; Lukáš Thor
15	Javier Alonso Cabahug	– Not played	Lukáš Patzák

==== Slovakia vs Poland ====
Slovakia
2
Tatabányai Multifunkcionális Csarnok, Court 4
21 August 2026, 12:00 UTC+2

Poland
0

		Result
		(Slovakia) 1–0 (Poland)
1	Andrej Suchý	11 – 6 (11–6)	Szymon Gwiazda
2	Laura Fodorová	22 – 15 (11–9)	Dominika Bartłomiejczuk
3	Andrej Suchý; Ella Eliášková	33 – 21 (11–6)	Mateusz Michalik; Zuzanna Żemła
4	Ela Bieleschova; Vanessa Osadska	44 – 29 (11–8)	Hanna Stachera; Zuzanna Żemła
5	Andrej Macek; Andrej Suchý	55 – 41 (11–12)	Szymon Gwiazda; Jakub Mazurek
		(Slovakia) 2–0 (Poland)
6	Andrej Suchý	11 – 8 (11–8)	Jakub Dulemba
7	Laura Fodorová	22 – 20 (11–12)	Wiktoria Kaletka
8	Andrej Suchý; Ella Eliášková	33 – 28 (11–8)	Mateusz Michalik; Hanna Stachera
9	Ela Bieleschova; Vanessa Osadska	44 – 31 (11–3)	Hanna Stachera; Zuzanna Żemła
10	Andrej Macek; Andrej Suchý	55 – 43 (11–12)	Jakub Mazurek; Mateusz Michalik
Tie won by Slovakia
11	Andrej Suchý	– Not played	Jakub Mazurek
12	Laura Fodorová	– Not played	Olga Szwarnowiecka
13	Andrej Suchý; Ella Eliášková	– Not played	Szymon Gwiazda; Wiktoria Kaletka
14	Ela Bieleschova; Vanessa Osadska	– Not played	Dominika Bartłomiejczuk; Wiktoria Kaletka
15	Andrej Macek; Andrej Suchý	– Not played	Pawel Kiszczyk; Mateusz Michalik

=== 17th to 24th place ===
==== Hungary vs Austria ====
Hungary
2
Tatabányai Multifunkcionális Csarnok, Court 3
21 August 2026, 15:00 UTC+2

Austria
0

		Result
		(Hungary) 1–0 (Austria)
1	Elza Sándor	9 – 11 (9–11)	Matilda Simma
2	Eliza Liang; Elza Sándor	18 – 22 (9–11)	Amélie Thurnherr; Jana Weissenbach
3	Zénó Ágai	33 – 30 (15–8)	Martin Zhang
4	Zsombor Erdős; Péter Palkovics	44 – 40 (11–10)	Thomas Wiesler; Martin Zhang
5	Balázs Pető; Anna Pinke	55 – 51 (11–11)	Shangzu Zhan; Natalia Galova
		(Hungary) 2–0 (Austria)
6	Eliza Liang	2 – 11 (2–11)	Matilda Simma
7	Etelka Karalyos; Anna Pinke	13 – 22 (11–11)	Amélie Thurnherr; Jana Weissenbach
8	Péter Palkovics	24 – 33 (11–11)	Martin Zhang
9	Zénó Ágai; Balázs Pető	41 – 44 (17–11)	Thomas Wiesler; Martin Zhang
10	Péter Palkovics; Etelka Karalyos	55 – 52 (14–8)	Shangzu Zhan; Natalia Galova
Tie won by Hungary
11	Eliza Liang	– Not played	Matilda Simma
12	Etelka Karalyos; Anna Pinke	– Not played	Amélie Thurnherr; Jana Weissenbach
13	Péter Palkovics	– Not played	Martin Zhang
14	Zénó Ágai; Péter Palkovics	– Not played	Thomas Wiesler; Martin Zhang
15	Balázs Pető; Anna Pinke	– Not played	Shangzu Zhan; Natalia Galova

==== Lithuania vs Italy ====
Lithuania
2
Tatabányai Multifunkcionális Csarnok, Court 4
21 August 2026, 15:00 UTC+2

Italy
0

		Result
		(Lithuania) 1–0 (Italy)
1	Daniel Leonovič; Ieva Paskevičiūtė	11 – 7 (11–7)	Karl Ladurner; Lena Kobler
2	Giedra Velykytė	22 – 9 (11–2)	Lena Kobler
3	Dominik Tankevič	33 – 15 (11–6)	Sebastian Tataru
4	Uma Ivanauskaitė; Jorūnė Salnaitė	44 – 31 (11–16)	Anna Hell; Margherita Tognetti
5	Joris Ivanauskas; Dominik Tankevič	55 – 37 (11–6)	Davide Izzo; Karl Ladurner
		(Lithuania) 2–0 (Italy)
6	Joris Ivanauskas; Uma Ivanauskaitė	7 – 11 (7–11)	Davide Izzo; Margherita Tognetti
7	Jorūnė Salnaitė	22 – 20 (15–9)	Margherita Tognetti
8	Daniel Leonovič	33 – 31 (11–11)	Davide Izzo
9	Ieva Paskevičiūtė; Giedra Velykytė	44 – 37 (11–6)	Anna Hell; Margherita Tognetti
10	Joris Ivanauskas; Dominik Tankevič	55 – 41 (11–4)	Karl Ladurner; Sebastian Tataru
Tie won by Lithuania
11	Daniel Leonovič; Ieva Paskevičiūtė	– Not played	Sebastian Tataru; Margherita Tognetti
12	Jorūnė Salnaitė	– Not played	Anna Hell
13	Rokas Lesinskas	– Not played	Davide Izzo
14	Uma Ivanauskaitė; Jorūnė Salnaitė	– Not played	Anna Hell; Margherita Tognetti
15	Daniel Leonovič; Rokas Lesinskas	– Not played	Davide Izzo; Sebastian Tataru

==== Romania vs Scotland ====
Romania
0
Tatabányai Multifunkcionális Csarnok, Court 5
21 August 2026, 12:00 UTC+2

Scotland
2

		Result
		(Romania) 0–1 (Scotland)
1	Maxim Iacob	11 – 10 (11–10)	Arnav Saraswat
2	Călin Grăjdieru; Maxim Iacob	18 – 22 (7–12)	Alfie Martin; Lewis Smith
3	Daria-Irina Gherasim	29 – 33 (11–11)	Jaagruti Mannem
4	Daria-Irina Gherasim; Cristina Maria Sirbu	39 – 44 (10–11)	Deepti Vijayakumar; Qing Yang Xiao
5	George Alexandru Mocan; Cristina Maria Sirbu	50 – 55 (11–11)	Alfie Martin; Deepti Vijayakumar
		(Romania) 0–2 (Scotland)
6	Maxim Iacob	11 – 8 (11–8)	Arnav Saraswat
7	Călin Grăjdieru; Maxim Iacob	22 – 20 (11–12)	Alfie Martin; Lewis Smith
8	Daria-Irina Gherasim	25 – 33 (3–13)	Jaagruti Mannem
9	Daria-Irina Gherasim; Cristina Maria Sirbu	30 – 44 (5–11)	Deepti Vijayakumar; Qing Yang Xiao
10	George Alexandru Mocan; Cristina Maria Sirbu	37 – 55 (7–11)	Alfie Martin; Deepti Vijayakumar
Tie won by Scotland
11	Maxim Iacob	– Not played	Arnav Saraswat
12	Călin Grăjdieru; Maxim Iacob	– Not played	Alfie Martin; Lewis Smith
13	Daria-Irina Gherasim	– Not played	Jaagruti Mannem
14	Daria-Irina Gherasim; Cristina Maria Sirbu	– Not played	Deepti Vijayakumar; Qing Yang Xiao
15	George Alexandru Mocan; Cristina Maria Sirbu	– Not played	Alfie Martin; Deepti Vijayakumar

==== Latvia vs Portugal ====
Latvia
1
Tatabányai Multifunkcionális Csarnok, Court 6
21 August 2026, 12:00 UTC+2

Portugal
2

		Result
		(Latvia) 1–0 (Portugal)
1	Madara Gaure	11 – 5 (11–5)	Helena Almeida
2	Regnars Bajārs	16 – 22 (5–17)	Tiago Berenguer
3	Oskars Bajārs; Regnars Bajārs	26 – 33 (10–11)	Cesar Rodrigues; Tomas Rodrigues
4	Madara Gaure; Māra Nevedomska	39 – 44 (13–11)	Rafaela Silva; Maribel Sousa
5	Regnars Bajārs; Madara Gaure	55 – 54 (16–10)	Francisco Jones; Elisabete Horban
		(Latvia) 1–1 (Portugal)
6	Madara Gaure	7 – 11 (7–11)	Maribel Sousa
7	Renārs Kārkliņš	9 – 22 (2–11)	Martim Marques
8	Oskars Bajārs; Regnars Bajārs	18 – 33 (9–11)	Tiago Berenguer; Francisco Jones
9	Madara Gaure; Māra Nevedomska	21 – 44 (3–11)	Elisabete Horban; Rafaela Silva
10	Regnars Bajārs; Evelīna Freija	31 – 55 (10–11)	Tiago Berenguer; Rafaela Silva
		(Latvia) 1–2 (Portugal)
11	Madara Gaure	11 – 10 (11–10)	Rafaela Silva
12	Regnars Bajārs	19 – 22 (8–12)	Cesar Rodrigues
13	Oskars Bajārs; Regnars Bajārs	26 – 33 (7–11)	Tiago Berenguer; Martim Marques
14	Evelīna Freija; Madara Gaure	33 – 44 (7–11)	Elisabete Horban; Rafaela Silva
15	Regnars Bajārs; Madara Gaure	44 – 55 (11–11)	Tiago Berenguer; Maribel Sousa
Tie won by Portugal

=== 25th to 30th place ===
==== Luxembourg vs Finland ====
Luxembourg
2
Tatabányai Multifunkcionális Csarnok, Court 5
21 August 2026, 09:00 UTC+2

Finland
0

		Result
		(Luxembourg) 1–0 (Finland)
1	Filip Liska	11 – 5 (11–5)	Johannes Lehtinen
2	Luca Perfido; Maximilian Zeimes	14 – 22 (3–17)	Axel Gras; Sam Lindberg
3	Daria Demchykhina	31 – 33 (17–11)	Cecilia Lehtinen
4	Filip Liska; Jill Felten	40 – 44 (9–11)	Sam Lindberg; Sanni Lehtinen
5	Daria Demchykhina; Jill Felten	55 – 54 (15–10)	Sanni Lehtinen; Unni Parikka
		(Luxembourg) 2–0 (Finland)
6	Filip Liska	5 – 11 (5–11)	Axel Gras
7	Luca Perfido; Maximilian Zeimes	12 – 22 (7–11)	Johannes Lehtinen; Sam Lindberg
8	Daria Demchykhina	15 – 33 (3–11)	Ananya Kandala
9	Filip Liska; Jill Felten	25 – 44 (10–11)	Sam Lindberg; Unni Parikka
10	Daria Demchykhina; Jill Felten	55 – 53 (30–9)	Sanni Lehtinen; Unni Parikka
Tie won by Luxembourg
11	Filip Liska	– Not played	Axel Gras
12	Luca Perfido; Maximilian Zeimes	– Not played	Akseli Hämeenheimo; Sam Lindberg
13	Daria Demchykhina	– Not played	Cecilia Lehtinen
14	Filip Liska; Jill Felten	– Not played	Johannes Lehtinen; Sanni Lehtinen
15	Daria Demchykhina; Jill Felten	– Not played	Sanni Lehtinen; Unni Parikka

==== Croatia vs Iceland ====
Croatia
2
Tatabányai Multifunkcionális Csarnok, Court 5
21 August 2026, 15:00 UTC+2

Iceland
0

		Result
		(Croatia) 1–0 (Iceland)
1	Ana Pranić; Tea Rebesco	11 – 4 (11–4)	Katla Sól Arnarsdóttir; Emma Katrin Helgadóttir
2	Maja Pranić	22 – 13 (11–9)	Iðunn Jakobsdóttir
3	Vid Borota	33 – 28 (11–15)	Eggert Þór Eggertsson
4	Tin Radovanović; Marko Šurina	44 – 33 (11–5)	Eggert Þór Eggertsson; Óðinn Magnússon
5	Marko Šurina; Maja Pranić	55 – 38 (11–5)	Óðinn Magnússon; Iðunn Jakobsdóttir
		(Croatia) 2–0 (Iceland)
6	Ana Pranić; Maja Pranić	11 – 5 (11–5)	Katla Sól Arnarsdóttir; Emma Katrin Helgadóttir
7	Maja Pranić	22 – 13 (11–8)	Iðunn Jakobsdóttir
8	Marko Šurina	33 – 17 (11–4)	Eggert Þór Eggertsson
9	Vid Borota; Tin Radovanović	44 – 25 (11–8)	Rúnar Gauti Kristjánsson; Óðinn Magnússon
10	Vito Radovanović; Tea Rebesco	55 – 36 (11–11)	Óðinn Magnússon; Iðunn Jakobsdóttir
Tie won by Croatia
11	Ana Pranić; Maja Pranić	– Not played	Katla Sól Arnarsdóttir; Emma Katrin Helgadóttir
12	Ana Pranić	– Not played	Iðunn Jakobsdóttir
13	Vito Radovanović	– Not played	Eggert Þór Eggertsson
14	Tin Radovanović; Marko Šurina	– Not played	Eggert Þór Eggertsson; Óðinn Magnússon
15	Vito Radovanović; Ana Pranić	– Not played	Óðinn Magnússon; Iðunn Jakobsdóttir

==== Ireland vs Norway ====
Ireland
2
Tatabányai Multifunkcionális Csarnok, Court 6
21 August 2026, 09:00 UTC+2

Norway
0

		Result
		(Republic of Ireland) 1–0 (Norway)
1	Jun-Jie Rong	9 – 11 (9–11)	Deeptanshu Toka
2	Corey Chambers; Jun-Jie Rong	22 – 21 (13–10)	David Nguyen; William Barø
3	Amira Pender; Hannah Shochan	29 – 33 (7–12)	Maria Ellingsen; Oline Langeland Risa
4	Hannah Shochan	44 – 42 (15–9)	Varshini Manikandan
5	Corey Chambers; Amira Pender	55 – 49 (11–7)	David Nguyen; Varshini Manikandan
		(Republic of Ireland) 2–0 (Norway)
6	Aiden Biju Joy	9 – 11 (9–11)	Deeptanshu Toka
7	Aiden Biju Joy; Jun-Jie Rong	22 – 20 (13–9)	David Nguyen; William Barø
8	Carol Joy; Anna Lucey O'Sullivan	30 – 33 (8–13)	Maria Ellingsen; Oline Langeland Risa
9	Carol Joy	44 – 37 (14–4)	Varshini Manikandan
10	Corey Chambers; Amira Pender	55 – 49 (11–12)	William Barø; Oline Langeland Risa
Tie won by (Republic of Ireland) Ireland
11	Jun-Jie Rong	– Not played	Deeptanshu Toka
12	Corey Chambers; Jun-Jie Rong	– Not played	David Nguyen; William Barø
13	Carol Joy; Anna Lucey O'Sullivan	– Not played	Maria Ellingsen; Oline Langeland Risa
14	Hannah Shochan	– Not played	Varshini Manikandan
15	Corey Chambers; Amira Pender	– Not played	David Nguyen; Varshini Manikandan

== Knockout stage ==
=== Bracket ===
Quarter-finals
France	2
Bulgaria	0
Germany	2
Estonia	0
Turkey	2
Spain	0
England	0
Denmark	2

Semi-finals
France	2
Germany	0
Turkey	1
Denmark	2

Final
France	2
Denmark	1

=== Quarter-finals ===
==== France vs Bulgaria ====
France
2
Tatabányai Multifunkcionális Csarnok, Court 1
21 August 2026, 09:00 UTC+2

Bulgaria
0

		Result
		(France) 1–0 (Bulgaria)
1	Leana Laurent	11 – 9 (11–9)	Simay Mehmedova
2	Eva Bouville; Marjolene Raffin	22 – 15 (11–6)	Simay Mehmedova; Viktoriya Popova
3	Rayan Benaissa; Manon Heitzmann	33 – 25 (11–10)	Georgi Ruptsov; Simay Mehmedova
4	Mady Sow	44 – 31 (11–6)	Teodor Mitev
5	Timeo Bourgin; Orphé Queton-Bouissou	55 – 34 (11–3)	Teodor Mitev; Georgi Ruptsov
		(France) 2–0 (Bulgaria)
6	Leana Laurent	11 – 3 (11–3)	Lilly Radeva
7	Lily Gautier; Manon Heitzmann	22 – 13 (11–10)	Simay Mehmedova; Viktoriya Popova
8	Timeo Bourgin; Marjolene Raffin	33 – 18 (11–5)	Georgi Ruptsov; Simay Mehmedova
9	Mady Sow	44 – 25 (11–7)	Teodor Mitev
10	Rayan Benaissa; Mady Sow	55 – 26 (11–1)	Teodor Mitev; Maïkel Popov
Tie won by France
11	Leana Laurent	– Not played	Simay Mehmedova
12	Lily Gautier; Manon Heitzmann	– Not played	Simay Mehmedova; Viktoriya Popova
13	Rayan Benaissa; Manon Heitzmann	– Not played	Georgi Ruptsov; Simay Mehmedova
14	Mady Sow	– Not played	Teodor Mitev
15	Timeo Bourgin; Orphé Queton-Bouissou	– Not played	Teodor Mitev; Georgi Ruptsov

==== Germany vs Estonia ====
Germany
2
Tatabányai Multifunkcionális Csarnok, Court 3
21 August 2026, 09:00 UTC+2

Estonia
0

		Result
		(Germany) 1–0 (Estonia)
1	Linus Emmerich; Fynn Ohliger	11 – 5 (11–5)	Marti Joost; Rasmus Roogsoo
2	Lisa Paula Bonnemann	22 – 17 (11–12)	Marija Paskotši
3	Kalliope Hermel; Maike Iffland	33 – 24 (11–7)	Lumikki Liias; Marija Paskotši
4	Fynn Ohliger; Kalliope Hermel	44 – 42 (11–18)	Rasmus Roogsoo; Lumikki Liias
5	Leon Kaschura	55 – 51 (11–9)	Marti Joost
		(Germany) 2–0 (Estonia)
6	Linus Emmerich; Fynn Ohliger	11 – 8 (11–8)	Marti Joost; Rasmus Roogsoo
7	Lisa Paula Bonnemann	22 – 21 (11–13)	Romili Vakk
8	Kalliope Hermel; Maike Iffland	33 – 24 (11–3)	Lumikki Liias; Marija Paskotši
9	Fynn Ohliger; Kalliope Hermel	44 – 37 (11–13)	Rasmus Roogsoo; Lumikki Liias
10	Mats Wohlers	55 – 49 (11–12)	Marti Joost
Tie won by Germany
11	Linus Emmerich; Fynn Ohliger	– Not played	Marti Joost; Rasmus Roogsoo
12	Lisa Paula Bonnemann	– Not played	Marija Paskotši
13	Kalliope Hermel; Maike Iffland	– Not played	Lumikki Liias; Marija Paskotši
14	Fynn Ohliger; Kalliope Hermel	– Not played	Rasmus Roogsoo; Lumikki Liias
15	Leon Kaschura	– Not played	Marti Joost

==== Turkey vs Spain ====
Turkey
2
Tatabányai Multifunkcionális Csarnok, Court 4
21 August 2026, 09:00 UTC+2

Spain
0

		Result
		(Turkey) 1–0 (Spain)
1	Mehmet Can Töremiş	11 – 7 (11–7)	Yaidel Gil
2	Aleyna Korkut	22 – 18 (11–11)	Sara del Castillo
3	Gökay Göl; Nisa Nur Çimen	33 – 26 (11–8)	Mario Rodríguez; Noelia López
4	Elifnur Demir; Zeynep Berre Ocakoğlu	44 – 32 (11–6)	Iziar Barcala; Sofía García
5	Gökay Göl; Mehmet Can Töremiş	55 – 41 (11–9)	Yaidel Gil; Mario Rodríguez
		(Turkey) 2–0 (Spain)
6	Mehmet Can Töremiş	11 – 4 (11–4)	Mario Rodríguez
7	Aleyna Korkut	22 – 12 (11–8)	Sara del Castillo
8	Gökay Göl; Nisa Nur Çimen	33 – 20 (11–8)	Yaidel Gil; Noelia López
9	Elifnur Demir; Zeynep Berre Ocakoğlu	44 – 24 (11–4)	Iziar Barcala; Sofía García
10	Gökay Göl; Mehmet Can Töremiş	55 – 30 (11–6)	Yaidel Gil; Mario Rodríguez
Tie won by Turkey
11	Mehmet Can Töremiş	– Not played	Yaidel Gil
12	Aleyna Korkut	– Not played	Sara del Castillo
13	Gökay Göl; Nisa Nur Çimen	– Not played	Mario Rodríguez; Noelia López
14	Elifnur Demir; Zeynep Berre Ocakoğlu	– Not played	Iziar Barcala; Sofía García
15	Gökay Göl; Mehmet Can Töremiş	– Not played	Yaidel Gil; Mario Rodríguez

==== England vs Denmark ====
England
0
Tatabányai Multifunkcionális Csarnok, Court 2
21 August 2026, 09:00 UTC+2

Denmark
2

		Result
		(England) 0–1 (Denmark)
1	George Clare; James Song	4 – 11 (4–11)	Sebastian Mønster Andersen; Birk Norman
2	Rajvi Parab	21 – 22 (17–11)	Ida Nissen
3	James Song; Anna Stewart	28 – 33 (7–11)	Sebastian Mønster Andersen; Filippa Pedersen
4	Rajvi Parab; Tin Wing Wan	32 – 44 (4–11)	Filippa Pedersen; Athene Lyduch Thornild
5	Anish Nair	35 – 55 (3–11)	Frederik Hinding
		(England) 0–2 (Denmark)
6	George Clare; James Song	6 – 11 (6–11)	Sebastian Mønster Andersen; Birk Norman
7	Rajvi Parab	19 – 22 (13–11)	Athene Lyduch Thornild
8	James Song; Anna Stewart	33 – 30 (14–8)	Mikkel Eilersen Bouet; Anna Louise Winther
9	Rajvi Parab; Tin Wing Wan	42 – 44 (9–14)	Julie Søgaard; Anna Louise Winther
10	Anish Nair	49 – 55 (7–11)	Maximilian Ørding Kauffmann
Tie won by Denmark
11	George Clare; James Song	– Not played	Sebastian Mønster Andersen; Birk Norman
12	Rajvi Parab	– Not played	Athene Lyduch Thornild
13	James Song; Anna Stewart	– Not played	Mikkel Eilersen Bouet; Anna Louise Winther
14	Rajvi Parab; Tin Wing Wan	– Not played	Filippa Pedersen; Athene Lyduch Thornild
15	Anish Nair	– Not played	Frederik Hinding

=== Semi-finals ===
==== France vs Germany ====
France
2
Tatabányai Multifunkcionális Csarnok, Court 2
21 August 2026, 18:00 UTC+2

Germany
0

		Result
		(France) 1–0 (Germany)
1	Leana Laurent	11 – 6 (11–6)	Lisa Paula Bonnemann
2	Mady Sow	22 – 9 (11–3)	Leon Kaschura
3	Lily Gautier; Manon Heitzmann	33 – 17 (11–8)	Kalliope Hermel; Maike Iffland
4	Timeo Bourgin; Marjolene Raffin	44 – 24 (11–7)	Jakob Sjöblom; Marie Fein
5	Rayan Benaissa; Mady Sow	55 – 33 (11–9)	Linus Emmerich; Fynn Ohliger
		(France) 2–0 (Germany)
6	Leana Laurent	9 – 11 (9–11)	Charlotte Wendt
7	Mady Sow	22 – 18 (13–7)	Mats Wohlers
8	Eva Bouville; Marjolene Raffin	32 – 33 (10–15)	Kalliope Hermel; Maike Iffland
9	Timeo Bourgin; Marjolene Raffin	44 – 40 (12–7)	Leon Kaschura; Juna Bartsch
10	Rayan Benaissa; Mady Sow	55 – 46 (11–6)	Linus Emmerich; Fynn Ohliger
Tie won by France
11	Leana Laurent	– Not played	Lisa Paula Bonnemann
12	Mady Sow	– Not played	Leon Kaschura
13	Lily Gautier; Manon Heitzmann	– Not played	Kalliope Hermel; Maike Iffland
14	Timeo Bourgin; Marjolene Raffin	– Not played	Jakob Sjöblom; Marie Fein
15	Rayan Benaissa; Mady Sow	– Not played	Linus Emmerich; Fynn Ohliger

==== Turkey vs Denmark ====
Turkey
1
Tatabányai Multifunkcionális Csarnok, Court 1
21 August 2026, 18:00 UTC+2

Denmark
2

		Result
		(Turkey) 0–1 (Denmark)
1	Mehmet Can Töremiş	9 – 11 (9–11)	Frederik Hinding
2	Elifnur Demir	16 – 22 (7–11)	Athene Lyduch Thornild
3	Gökay Göl; Nisa Nur Çimen	31 – 33 (15–11)	Sebastian Mønster Andersen; Filippa Pedersen
4	Elifnur Demir; Zeynep Berre Ocakoğlu	44 – 40 (13–7)	Julie Søgaard; Anna Louise Winther
5	Gökay Göl; Mehmet Can Töremiş	53 – 55 (9–15)	Sebastian Mønster Andersen; Birk Norman
		(Turkey) 1–1 (Denmark)
6	Mehmet Can Töremiş	8 – 11 (8–11)	Frederik Hinding
7	Elifnur Demir	21 – 22 (13–11)	Ida Nissen
8	Gökay Göl; Nisa Nur Çimen	33 – 28 (12–6)	Sebastian Mønster Andersen; Filippa Pedersen
9	Elifnur Demir; Zeynep Berre Ocakoğlu	44 – 31 (11–3)	Filippa Pedersen; Athene Lyduch Thornild
10	Gökay Göl; Mehmet Can Töremiş	55 – 40 (11–9)	Mikkel Eilersen Bouet; Birk Norman
		(Turkey) 1–2 (Denmark)
11	Mehmet Can Töremiş	11 – 8 (11–8)	Frederik Hinding
12	Elifnur Demir	21 – 22 (10–14)	Athene Lyduch Thornild
13	Gökay Göl; Nisa Nur Çimen	30 – 33 (9–11)	Mikkel Eilersen Bouet; Filippa Pedersen
14	Elifnur Demir; Zeynep Berre Ocakoğlu	39 – 44 (9–11)	Filippa Pedersen; Athene Lyduch Thornild
15	Gökay Göl; Mehmet Can Töremiş	49 – 55 (10–11)	Sebastian Mønster Andersen; Birk Norman
Tie won by Denmark

=== Final ===
==== France vs Denmark ====
France
2
Tatabányai Multifunkcionális Csarnok, Court 1
22 August 2026, 10:30 UTC+2

Denmark
1

		Result
		(France) 1–0 (Denmark)
1	Mady Sow	8 – 11 (8–11)	Frederik Hinding
2	Leana Laurent	17 – 22 (9–11)	Athene Lyduch Thornild
3	Timeo Bourgin; Marjolene Raffin	29 – 33 (12–11)	Mikkel Eilersen Bouet; Filippa Pedersen
4	Lily Gautier; Manon Heitzmann	44 – 38 (15–5)	Filippa Pedersen; Athene Lyduch Thornild
5	Rayan Benaissa; Mady Sow	55 – 45 (11–7)	Sebastian Mønster Andersen; Birk Norman
		(France) 1–1 (Denmark)
6	Mady Sow	11 – 7 (11–7)	Frederik Hinding
7	Leana Laurent	20 – 22 (9–15)	Athene Lyduch Thornild
8	Timeo Bourgin; Marjolene Raffin	33 – 31 (13–9)	Mikkel Eilersen Bouet; Filippa Pedersen
9	Lily Gautier; Manon Heitzmann	42 – 44 (9–13)	Filippa Pedersen; Athene Lyduch Thornild
10	Rayan Benaissa; Mady Sow	53 – 55 (11–11)	Sebastian Mønster Andersen; Birk Norman
		(France) 2–1 (Denmark)
11	Mady Sow	11 – 5 (11–5)	Frederik Hinding
12	Leana Laurent	21 – 22 (10–17)	Athene Lyduch Thornild
13	Timeo Bourgin; Marjolene Raffin	33 – 29 (12–7)	Mikkel Eilersen Bouet; Filippa Pedersen
14	Lily Gautier; Manon Heitzmann	44 – 33 (11–4)	Filippa Pedersen; Athene Lyduch Thornild
15	Rayan Benaissa; Mady Sow	55 – 51 (11–18)	Sebastian Mønster Andersen; Birk Norman
Tie won by France
